= Ann Arbor station =

Train station in Michigan

Ann Arbor, MI
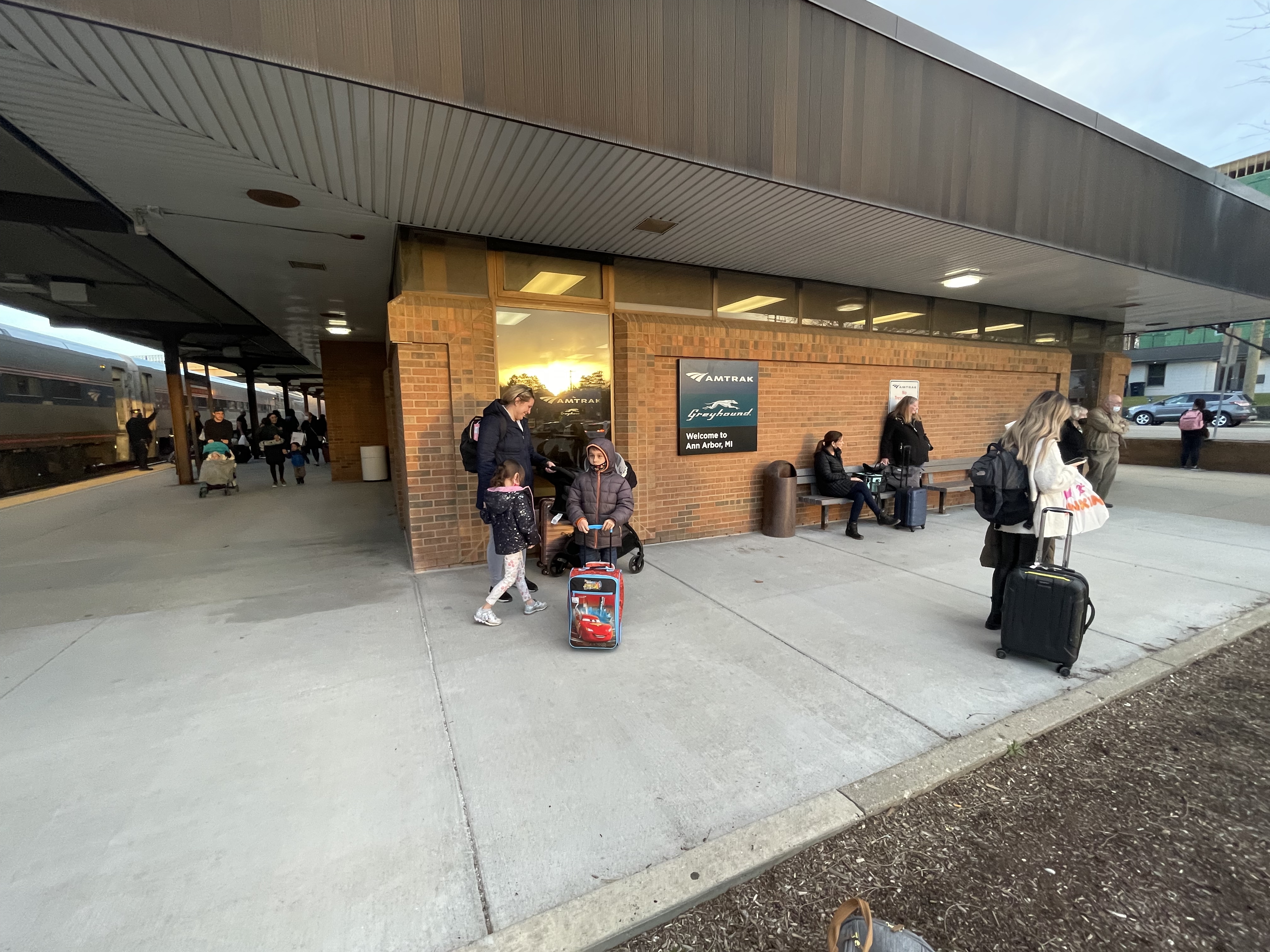
- Station house, photographed in 2022

General information
- Location: 325 Depot Street; Ann Arbor, Michigan; United States
- Coordinates: 42°17′16″N 83°44′35″W
- Owner: Amtrak
- Line: MDOT Michigan Line
- Platforms: 1 side platform
- Tracks: 1
- Connections: Amtrak Thruway

Construction
- Parking: Yes; metered
- Accessible: Yes

Other information
- Station code: Amtrak: ARB

History
- Opened: 1983

Passengers
- FY 2025: 150,296 (Amtrak)

Services
Preceding station	Amtrak	Following station
Jackson toward Chicago	Wolverine	Dearborn toward Pontiac
Former services
Preceding station	Amtrak	Following station
Jackson toward Chicago	Lake Cities 1980–2004	Dearborn toward Pontiac
Chelsea toward Jackson	Michigan Executive	Ypsilanti toward Detroit (Michigan Central)
Location

Ann Arbor station is a train station in Ann Arbor, Michigan, United States that is served by Amtrak's Wolverine, which runs three times daily in each direction between Chicago, Illinois and Pontiac, Michigan, via Detroit.

== History ==
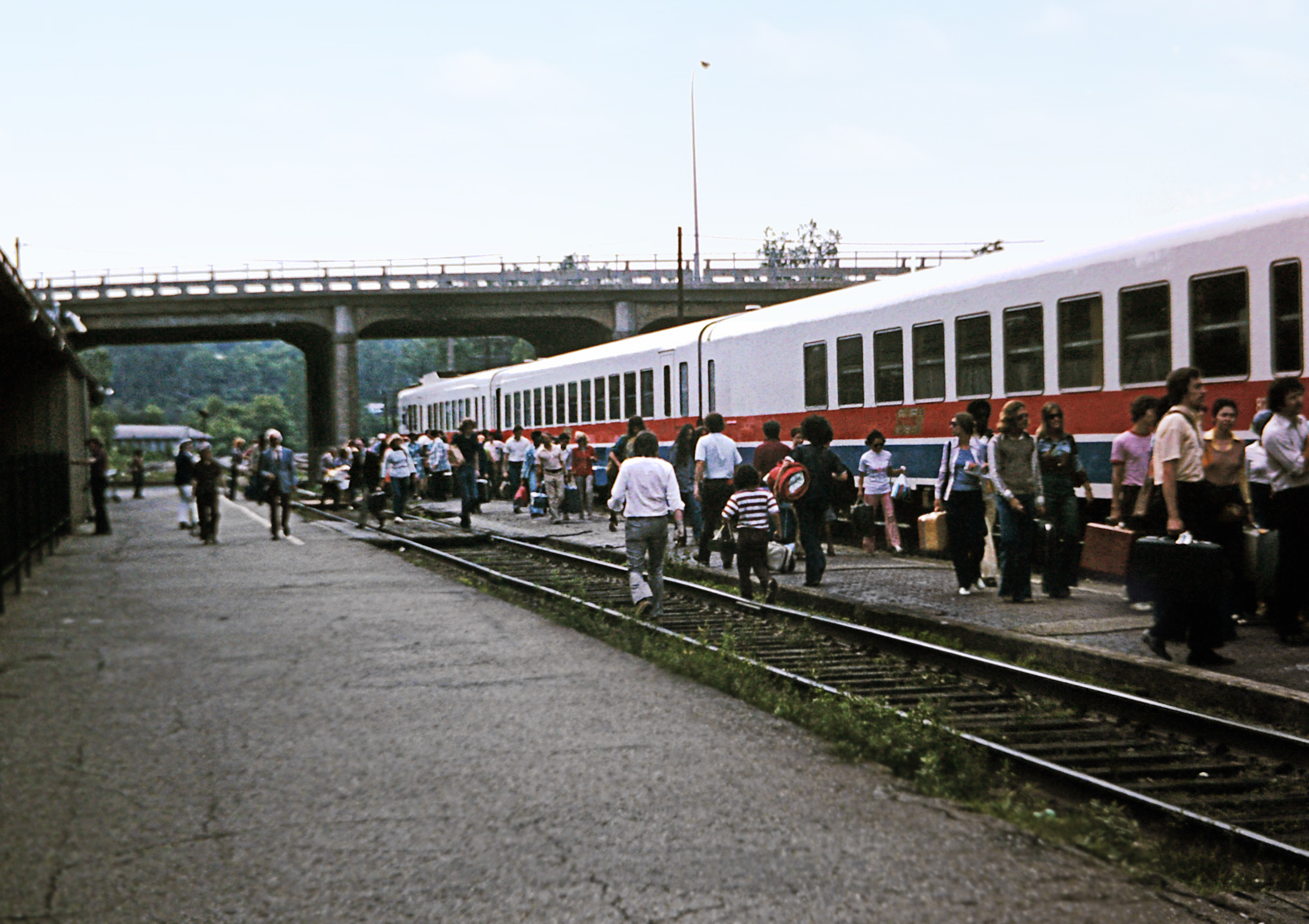
Passengers boarding the Turboliner service, 1975

The present-day station was built in 1983, as a replacement for the original 1877 Michigan Central Railroad-built depot, which the new station directly neighbors. The old depot was sold in 1969 to the C.A. Muer Corporation, by its original owner the Penn Central Transportation Company. It has since been renovated into the "Gandy Dancer" seafood restaurant, which opened in 1970. At the time of the sale the railroad believed it was likely they would soon be ceasing passenger operations outside of the Northeast Corridor, which would have rendered their ownership of the station unnecessary, so, when approached with an offer by the C.A. Muer Corporation to buy it, they accepted. Two years later, however, Amtrak was launched, keeping passenger service in Ann Arbor alive.

For more than a decade after the former station was sold, passengers in Ann Arbor used the railroad's former express office (located just east of the Broadway Bridge) as a station building. However, this proved to be inadequate in size, especially after daily passenger numbers rose from 15 in 1969 to 250 in 1975. By the mid-1970s, talk arose about constructing a new station to accommodate Ann Arbor's passengers. To expand the small waiting room space of the former express office as a station building, Amtrak began work on enclosing space under the canopy between the express office and the original Michigan Central Railroad station, but stopped after Ann Arbor issued a stop-work order due to Chuck Muer (C.A. Muer Corporation head) objecting, arguing there was insufficient parking at the site. As a makeshift measure, a surplus portable classroom building was purchased from the Ann Arbor Public Schools, and placed under the Broadway Bridge for use as an overflow waiting room.

On April 17, 1979, the Michigan Department of Transportation (MDOT) sent a letter to Ann Arbor Mayor Louis Belcher about the need for a new station building, writing, "Ann Arbor is the second heaviest Amtrak station (in passenger numbers) in Michigan and deserves adequate station and parking facilities." In mid-1979, interested parties, including MDOT, Ann Arbor's city government, the University of Michigan, Greyhound Lines, and the Michigan Association of Railroad Passengers, formed a committee to study the construction of a new station building, and where to locate it. Pollack Design Associates, an Ann Arbor-based firm, was contracted to conduct a study, including exploring alternative sites at which a new station building might be located. It released its 98-page report on November 15, 1979. Of the numerous sites looked at, 325 Depot Street came out as the preferred site.

Congressman Carl Pursell secured a federal earmark to fund the construction of a new station building.

The current station building was constructed in 1983. Additionally, a 100-space parking lot was constructed on the opposite side of the railroad tracks (with a stairway being installed to allow people to travel over the tracks). The station building was built in a standard design.

== Description ==
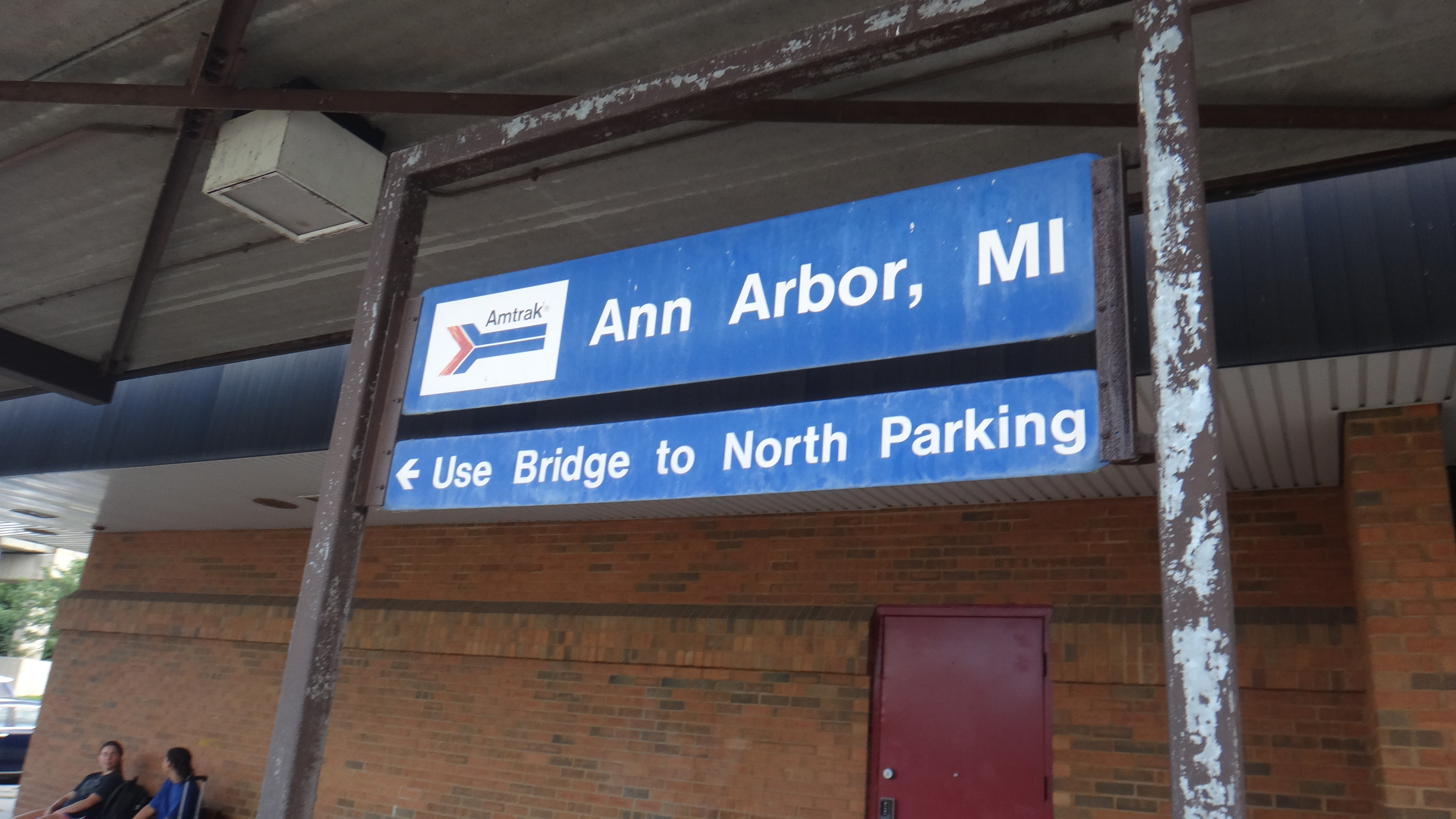
Sign at the platform

The station is located at 325 Depot Street, just west of the Broadway Street Bridge. The station is one mile (1.6 km) from the Blake Transit Center.

As per 2019 estimates, a population of 1,429,901 people lives within 25 miles (40 km) of the station, and a population of 5,556,996 lives within 50 miles (80 km) of the station.

The station is 3,206 square feet (297.8 m^{2}) in size. The station has a ticket office, is fully wheelchair accessible and has an enclosed waiting area. Other amenities include public restrooms, vending machines, paid parking, and a taxi stand. Baggage cannot be checked at this location; however, carry-ons of up to two suitcases, in addition to any "personal items" such as briefcases, purses, laptop bags, and infant equipment are allowed on board.

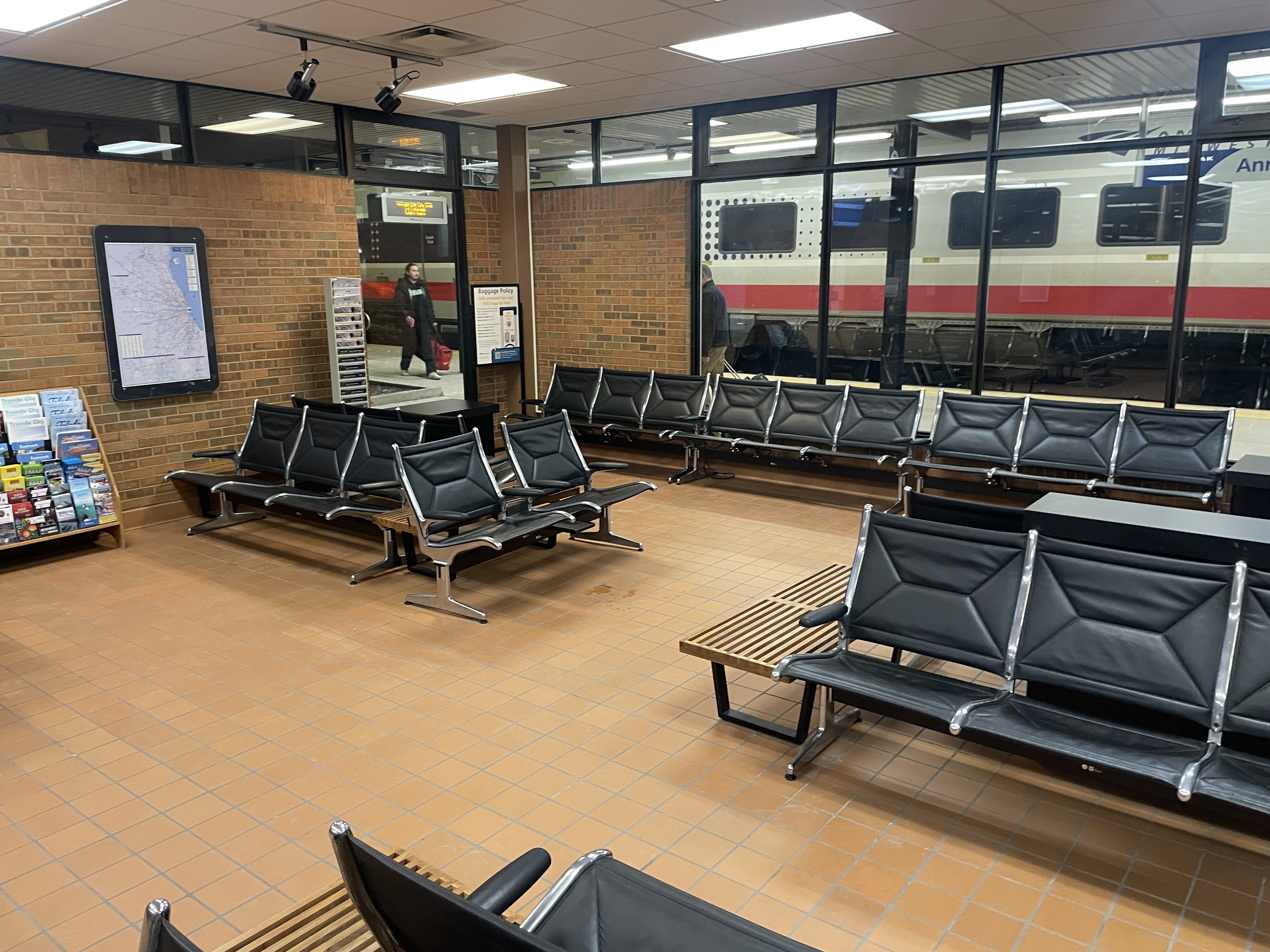
The waiting room at the station.

The station's waiting room has roughly 60 seats, which is less than its typical boarding loads (which were 80 to 120 passengers circa 2017).

The station has 38 metered short-term parking spaces, and 80 free long-term parking spots.

In regards to passenger numbers, Ann Arbor has been the busiest station along the Wolverine's route, with the exception of Chicago Union Station, and busiest Amtrak station in the state of Michigan, with 122,757 yearly riders as of 2022.

Notable nearby locations include the University of Michigan and the Great Lakes Environmental Research Laboratory.

== Rail services ==
Currently, the only train route serving the station is the Wolverine.

In the past, the station was served by the Michigan Executive and the Lake Cities.

Ann Arbor is a planned stop on the proposed Ann Arbor–Detroit Regional Rail system. Ann Arbor is also included as a stop on one possible alignment considered by MDOT for a potential "Coast-to-Coast" rail service, connecting the state's two largest cities (Detroit and Grand Rapids) with its capital city (Lansing).

== Amtrak ridership ==
After only Chicago Union Station, Ann Arbor is the busiest station on the Wolverine, as well as the busiest of the 22 Amtrak stations in Michigan.

In 2019, Amtrak handled 156,674 train arrivals and departures at the station. All of these were coach and business class tickets (the Wolverine does not have a first class or sleeper class). A vast majority of trips were to/from Chicago Union Station. Additionally, there were 2,057 passenger arrivals/departures to the single city which Amtrak Thruway bus service connects the station with.

In 2019, the average trip to/from the station was 216 miles (348 km) in distance, 9.4% of all trips at the station were to/from stations less than 100 miles (160 km) from the station, 6.9% were to stations between 100 and 200 miles (320 km) away, and 83.7% were to stations more than 200 miles (320 km) away.

In 2019, the average Amtrak fare to/from the station cost $47.00, and the average yield per mile (revenue generated per passenger mile) on trips to/from the station was $0.218.

In 2019, the top city pair on the Wolverine, both by ridership and by revenue, was Ann Arbor–Chicago. Ann Arbor–Kalamazoo ranked tenth among city pairs in terms of Wolverine revenue. The top city pair involving any of Michigan's 22 stations, both in terms of ridership and revenue, is Ann Arbor–Chicago. In 2019, of the 265 city pairs served at Chicago Union Station, Ann Arbor–Chicago ranked sixth-highest in both ridership and revenue.

=== Annual Amtrak passenger traffic ===
Annual Amtrak passenger traffic (arrivals + departures)
Year	Passengers (in thousands)	Change
2013	155.4	--
2014	141.4	▼9.0%
2015	141.2	▼1.4%
2016	127.2	▼9.9%
2017	144.1	▲13.3%
2018	155.6	▲8.0%
2019	156.7	▲0.7%
2020	77.8	▼50.4%
2021	46.7	▼40.0%
2022	122.7	▲162.7%

=== Top station pairs by Amtrak ridership ===
The following is the top-ten stations which receive the most ridership to/from ARTIC out of the (as of 2019) fifteen stations that the Wolverine connects the Ann Arbor Station to/from.

Top station pairs by Amtrak ridership (as of 2019)
Rank	Station	City	Distance from Ann Arbor station
1	Chicago Union Station	Chicago, Illinois	243 miles (391 km)
2	Kalamazoo Transportation Center	Kalamazoo, Michigan	105 miles (169 km)
3	Detroit	Detroit, Michigan	38 miles (61 km)
4	Troy Transit Center	Troy, Michigan	53 miles (85 km)
5	Dearborn	Dearborn, Michigan	30 miles (48 km)
6	Niles	Niles, Michigan	154 miles (248 km)
7	Royal Oak	Royal Oak, Michigan	49 miles (79 km)
8	Battle Creek Transportation Center	Battle Creek, Michigan	83 miles (134 km)
9	Jackson	Jackson, Michigan	38 miles (61 km)
6	New Buffalo	New Buffalo, Michigan	181 miles (291 km)

=== Top station pairs by Amtrak revenue ===
The following is the top-ten stations which generate the most revenue from trips to/from the (as of 2019) fifteen stations that the Wolverine connects the Ann Arbor Station to/from.

Top station pairs by Amtrak revenue (as of 2019)
Rank	Station	City	Distance from Ann Arbor station
1	Chicago Union Station	Chicago, Illinois	243 miles (391 km)
2	Kalamazoo Transportation Center	Kalamazoo, Michigan	105 miles (169 km)
3	Niles	Niles, Michigan	154 miles (248 km)
4	Detroit	Detroit, Michigan	38 miles (61 km)
5	Troy Transit Center	Troy, Michigan	53 miles (85 km)
6	Battle Creek Transportation Center	Battle Creek, Michigan	83 miles (134 km)
7	New Buffalo	New Buffalo, Michigan	181 miles (291 km)
7	Hammond–Whiting	Hammond, Indiana	227 miles (365 km)
9	Royal Oak	Royal Oak, Michigan	49 miles (79 km)
10	Dearborn	Dearborn, Michigan	30 miles (48 km)

== Proposed replacement station ==
Officials in Ann Arbor have expressed a belief that the existing station does not adequately accommodate the ridership in Ann Arbor, which has increased since the station was built. By the 2000s, Ann Arbor's city government was discussing replacing the current station with a larger station.

In addition to concerns about existing inadequacies of the current station, discussion about building a new station also arose in anticipation of increased use due to higher-speed service along the Wolverine route, the possible addition of more Amtrak service, as well as possibility of a commuter rail being established between Detroit and Ann Arbor.

By 2006, the city of Ann Arbor was making plans to construct a new station on Fuller Road by the University of Michigan Hospital, which would also serve planned commuter rail. However, in February 2012, it was determined the Ann Arbor and the University of Michigan would not be partnering to construct a 1,000 car parking structure for such a station, which led to the plan being scrapped. It had been estimated, at the time, that the station would have cost $30 million. Plans were that the city would have paid $3 million of the cost, and most of the cost would be paid for by the federal government.

October 15, 2012, the Ann Arbor City Council voted to accept a $2.8 million federal rail grant, and to spend $500,000 of the city general fund reserves to make preparations for a potential new station. In October 2013, the Ann Arbor City Council approved a resolution which hired the URS Corporation to lead an environmental review study for a new station.

As of 2014, projections had been made that, by some point between the years 2035 and 2040, if roundtrips of the Wolverine were increased to ten (from the existing three), annual ridership at the station could reach 969,000. Projections had also been made that a future commuter rail service could have 516,000 boardings and deboardings of its own.

In September 2017, the city of Ann Arbor released a 212-page environmental assessment report looking at options for a new station. The report was released with clearance from the Federal Railroad Administration, who the city had been in private discussions with for months.

In August 2021, the Federal Railroad Administration stopped work on environmental assessment for the station, citing high costs of the designed station, stating that the design, "exceeds intercity passenger rail needs". The FRA also took issue with the "substantial amount of parking" planned, even though the parking had been decided upon due to projected ridership needs and Amtrak guidelines.
