= Birmingham station (Michigan) =

Railway station in Birmingham, Michigan

Birmingham, MI
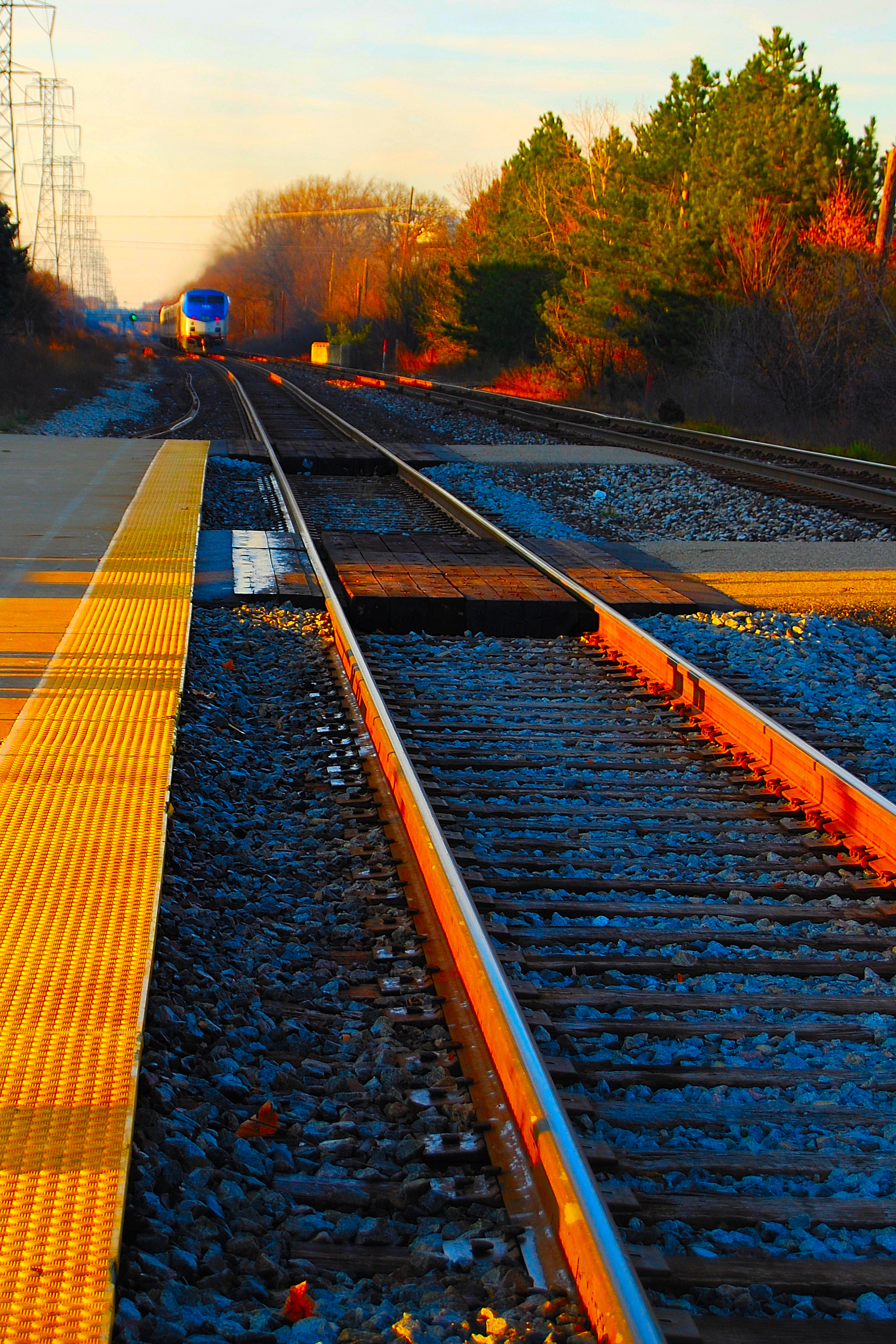
- A Wolverine departing Birmingham.

General information
- Location: 449 South Eton Street; Birmingham, MI 48009
- Coordinates: 42°32′44″N 83°11′39″W
- Line: Wolverine
- Platforms: 1 side platform
- Tracks: 2

Construction
- Parking: Yes; free

Other information
- Station code: BMM

History
- Closed: 13 October 2014

Passengers
- 2013: 23,257 ▲18%

Former services
Preceding station	Amtrak	Following station
Royal Oak toward Chicago	Wolverine	Pontiac Terminus
Preceding station	SEMTA	Following station
Oakwood Boulevard toward Detroit	Silver Streak	Charing Cross toward Pontiac
Location

Birmingham was an Amtrak train station in Birmingham, Michigan, served by the Wolverine service. The station was located on an embankment at the eastern end of Villa Road, and consisted of a concrete platform with a small shelter and wheelchair lift. On October 13, 2014, the station was closed and replaced by the Troy Transit Center, located about 1,200 feet (370 m) southeast on Doyle Drive in Troy, Michigan.

Historically, Birmingham had been a station for frequent Grand Trunk Western passenger service from Detroit to Pontiac and Durand. Until 1960 the GTW operated trains that went beyond Durand to Grand Rapids, on to Muskegon, where ferries could be boarded, for travelling across Lake Michigan, to Milwaukee. At Durand Union Station passengers could transfer the La Salle and the Inter-City Limited to Chicago, to the Inter-City Limited to Toronto and to mixed trains bound for Saginaw and Bay City.
