= Ann Arbor–Detroit Regional Rail =

Proposed commuter rail service between Ann Arbor and Detroit, Michigan

Overview
- Service type: Commuter rail
- Status: Proposed
- Locale: Southeast Michigan
- Current operator: RTA
- Ridership: 1,150–1,750 (projected)

Route
- Termini: Ann Arbor; New Center, Detroit
- Stops: 5
- Distance travelled: 39.72 mi (63.92 km)
- Average journey time: 45 minutes
- Service frequency: 8 round-trips per day
- Lines used: CSAO & AMTK Michigan Line; CN Shore Line Subdivision

Technical
- Track gauge: 1,435 mm (4 ft 8 1/2 in) standard gauge
- Track owner: MDOT

Ann Arbor–Detroit Regional Rail (also known as MiTrain and formerly known as SEMCOG Commuter Rail (Note: SEMCOG stands for Southeast Michigan Council of Governments, and is a collection of town, township, county, and city governments)) is a proposed commuter rail service along the Michigan Line between the cities of Ann Arbor and Detroit, Michigan, a total length of 39.72 miles (63.92 km). The project would connect with a proposed Detroit bus rapid transit service and the QLine streetcar.

== History ==
Detroit previously had commuter rail service. Until 1983, SEMTA operated Grand Trunk Western Railroad's former service between downtown Detroit, and Pontiac, Michigan. Amtrak continued Penn Central Detroit–Ann Arbor commuter service as the Michigan Executive until 1984.

In May 2009 SEMCOG commissioned a $200,000 study to determine whether commuter trains could operate along the same corridor as Amtrak intercity passenger trains and freight trains. As of November 2012 limited service for special events in Detroit was scheduled to begin in early 2013, while regular commuter service was scheduled for 2014, after further track upgrades are completed. However, As of October 2013 no operating funds had been identified and service was at least two years out.

From November 12 to 14, 2012, testing of the railcar fleet by an Amtrak GE Dash 8-32BWH locomotive took place between Pontiac and Jackson; while service will only initially operate between Ann Arbor and Detroit, testing the fleet on additional trackage eases the process required for future expansion to Jackson and Pontiac. The locomotives have not yet been tested.

The plan was folded into the RTA's master plan in May 2016. The service was estimated to cost $11-$19 million to operate annually, and $130 million in capital costs to start. At that time, it was thought that service could begin in 2022.

However as of March 2025, there have not been any updates on the project, and it is unknown if it was canceled or is still happening.

== Service ==
The service is proposed to operate eight round-trips during each day: three during morning and afternoon rush-hours, one during the midday, and one in the evening. An end-to-end ride is estimated to take 45 minutes, and there would be stops at Ann Arbor, Ypsilanti, Wayne, Dearborn and the New Center neighborhood in Detroit. Of these stops, four are existing or proposed Amtrak stations, and one (Wayne) would be a new station used exclusively for the regional rail service.

== Rolling stock ==
SEMCOG Commuter Rail's rolling stock are all ex-Metra Budd bi-level gallery-type cars and ex-GO Transit EMD F59PH units currently owned by RB Railway Leasing. SEMCOG has painted its rolling stock. Like Metra cab cars, SEMCOG's cab cars have red and white warning stripes at the front. They have plates that say "MiTrain" on the sides. As of 2026, most of the gallery cars were sold off to WeGo Star and Steam Railroading Institute, while F59PH locomotives remain with RB Railway Leasing (while some were sold to LTEX or FIT Mexico). Three more of these gallery cars, including two coaches and a cab car, were acquired by the Illinois Railway Museum in November 2026.

== See also ==
- WALLY
- Transportation in metropolitan Detroit
- Southeast Michigan
