= Grand Trunk Western Railroad Depot (Birmingham, Michigan) =

- Grand Trunk Western Railroad Birmingham Depot
- U.S. National Register of Historic Places
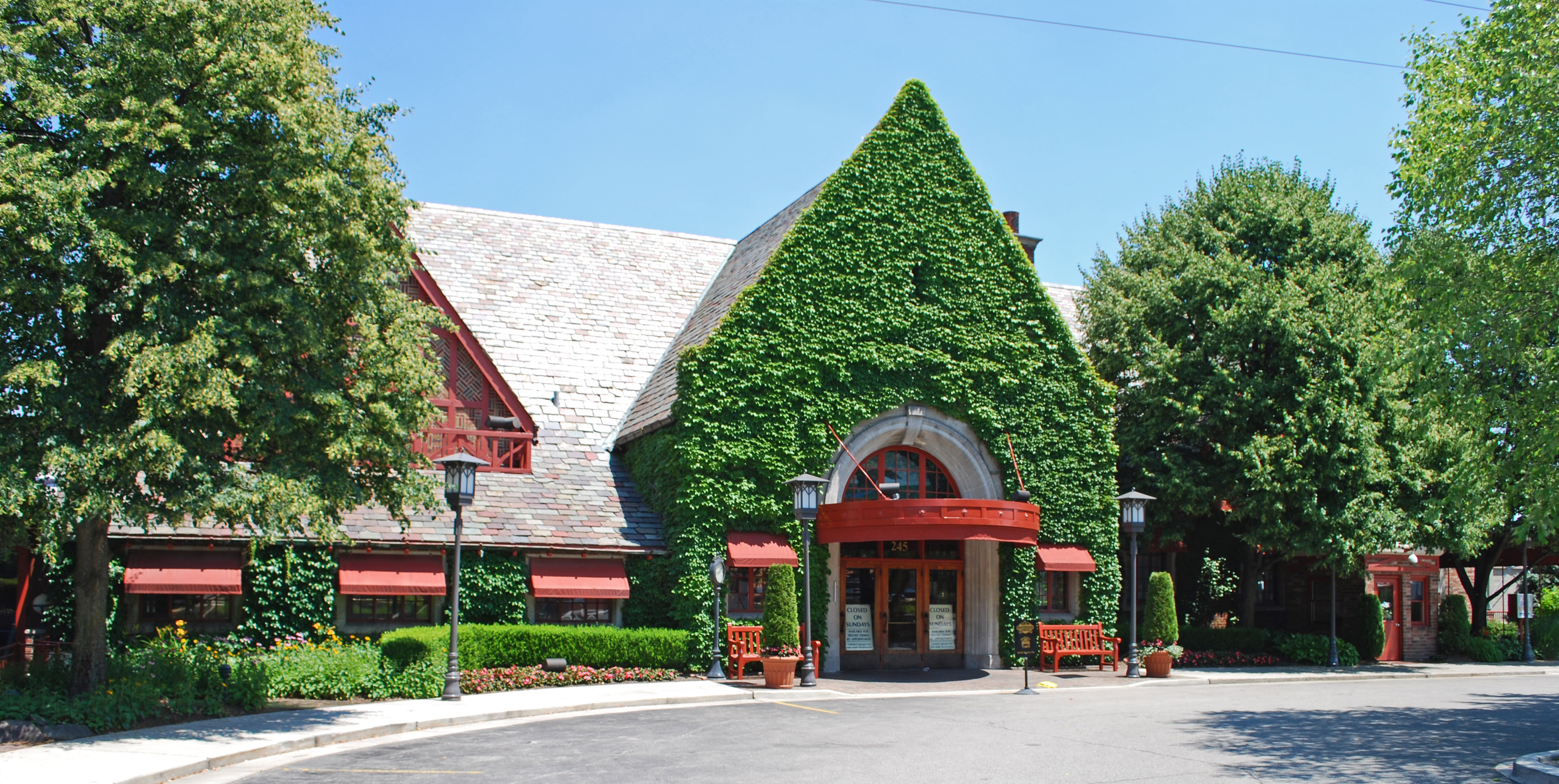
- Interactive map
- Location: 245 S. Eton St., Birmingham, Michigan
- Coordinates: 42°32′48″N 83°11′42″W
- Area: 2 acres (0.81 ha)
- Built: 1930
- Built by: George B. Walbridge and Albert H. Aldinger
- Architectural style: Tudor Revival
- NRHP reference No.: 85002148
- Added to NRHP: September 12, 1985

The Grand Trunk Western Railroad Birmingham Depot is a former railroad train station located at 245 South Eton Street in Birmingham, Michigan. It was listed on the National Register of Historic Places in 1985. As of 2022, the building is unoccupied.

== History ==
Passenger train service between Birmingham and Detroit first started in 1839, along a line that extended to Pontiac by 1840. This Detroit and Pontiac Railroad was absorbed into the Ottawa and Oakland line in 1848, and the Grand Trunk Railway in 1860.

The original rail lines ran alongside Woodward Avenue, but in the 1920s, due to the increase in both population and automobile traffic, the decision was made to widen Woodward. Grand Trunk was induced to abandon their right-of-way along Woodward and move their tracks a mile eastward. Between 1926 and 1930, Grand Trunk constructed a new line from Detroit to Pontiac, and in October 1930 began construction of this depot in Birmingham. They hired the Detroit firm of Walbridge and Aldinger to construct the building, and it and the line was completed by the middle of 1931.

In 1978, the railway vacated the building, and in 1979, it was purchased by a private owner. In 1984, it the building was restored and converted into a restaurant by Norman and Bonnie LePage. The restaurant was called Norman's Eton Street Station until 1997, when it changed its name to the Big Rock Chophouse. The restaurant closed at the end of 2021.

== Description ==
The former depot is a rectangular, gable-roofed, Tudor Revival structure constructed of red-brown brick with a slate roof. The structure has a concrete foundation and structural steel framing. The front facade has a projecting gabled entryway of white limestone, with a recessed round-head entrance. Several half-timbered gables are in the roof, with decorative herringbone and basketweave brickwork.

On the interior, the space has been divided into four dining rooms. The arched ceiling and walls are of painted plaster.

== See also ==
- National Register of Historic Places listings in Oakland County, Michigan

| Preceding station | SEMTA | Following station |
|---|---|---|
| Oakwood Boulevard toward Detroit | Silver Streak | Charing Cross toward Pontiac |
| Preceding station | Grand Trunk Western Railroad | Following station |
| Royal Oak toward Detroit | Detroit and Milwaukee Division | Pontiac toward Grand Haven |
| Oakwood Boulevard toward Detroit | Suburban Service (Detroit) | Charing Cross toward Pontiac |
