= Royal Oak station (Michigan) =

Intermodal transit station in Royal Oak, Michigan

Royal Oak, MI
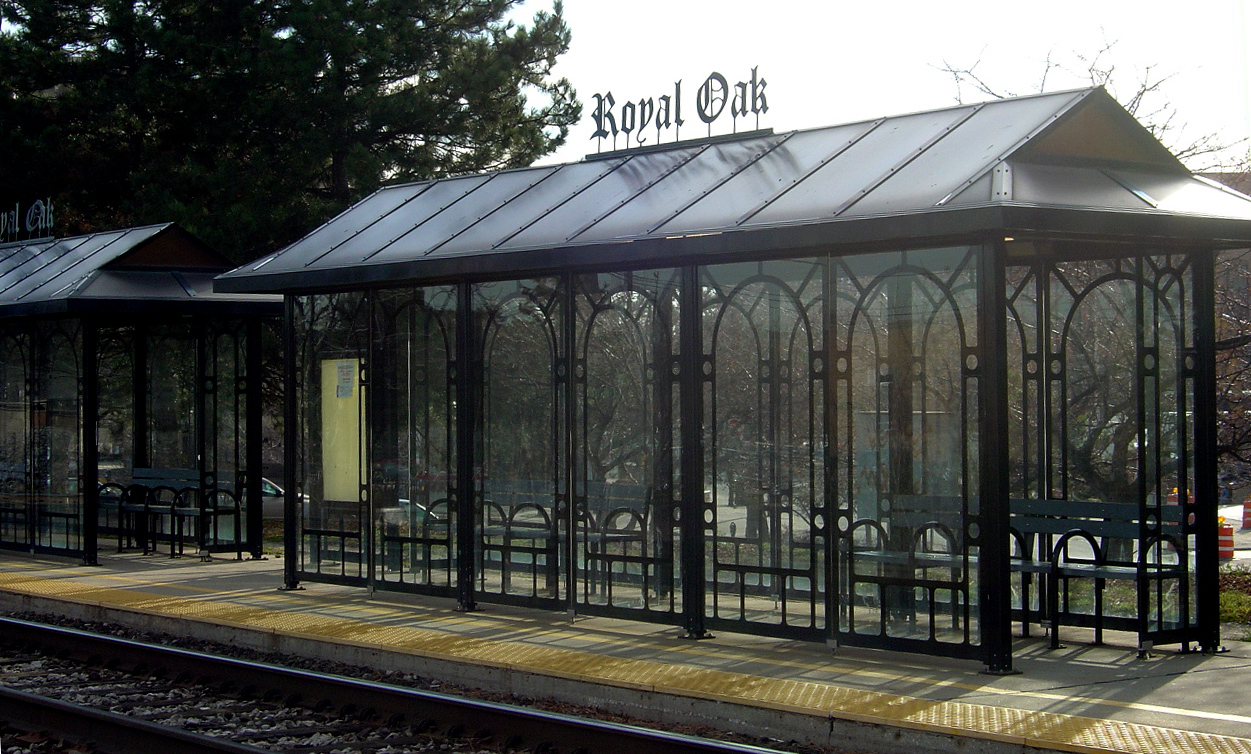
- Royal Oak train platform

General information
- Location: 201 South Sherman Drive; Royal Oak, Michigan; United States
- Coordinates: 42°29′21″N 83°08′51″W
- Owner: City of Royal Oak, Grand Trunk Western Railroad
- Platforms: 1 side platform
- Tracks: 2
- Connections: SMART 430, 460, 730, 740

Construction
- Parking: Short-term only
- Accessible: Yes

Other information
- Station code: Amtrak: ROY

History
- Opened: August 2, 1931; 1995
- Closed: October 17, 1983

Passengers
- FY 2025: 24,856 (Amtrak)

Services
Preceding station	Amtrak	Following station
Detroit toward Chicago	Wolverine	Troy toward Pontiac
Former services
Preceding station	Amtrak	Following station
Detroit toward Chicago	Wolverine	Birmingham Closed 2014 toward Pontiac
Preceding station	SEMTA	Following station
Pleasant Ridge toward Detroit	Silver Streak	Oakwood Boulevard toward Pontiac
Preceding station	Grand Trunk Western Railroad	Following station
Ferndale toward Detroit	Detroit and Milwaukee Division	Birmingham toward Grand Haven
Pleasant Ridge toward Detroit	Suburban Service (Detroit)	Oakwood Boulevard toward Pontiac
Location

The Royal Oak Transit Center is an intermodal transit station in Royal Oak, Michigan, a suburb of Detroit. It is served by Amtrak's Wolverine, which makes three round trips daily from nearby Pontiac to Chicago, Illinois. It also serves as a major hub for the region's SMART public transit network, serving four crosstown routes, and housing the system's only staffed ticket office in the suburbs. The station's Amtrak platform is unstaffed, though there is an Amtrak ticketing kiosk within SMART's facility.

The original Royal Oak station was located adjacent to Woodward Avenue. The railroad's modern alignment was established in the 1920s when Woodward Avenue was widened and the railroad moved to an eastern route. Commuter service to the new Royal Oak station commenced on August 2, 1931. Even after intercity rail service was consolidated nationwide under Amtrak in 1971, commuter service continued to be subsidized by the state of Michigan until 1983.

The inaugural run of the Amtrak Wolverine extension to Pontiac stopped at Royal Oak on May 3, 1994, though service to the station was halted shortly after due to maintenance, insurance, and staffing issues. It was added to the timetables the following year.
