= GFV =

GFV may refer to:

- Greenfield Village station, the station code GFV
- Government of Free Vietnam, an unrecognized Vietnamese anti-communist government in exile
- Granblue Fantasy Versus
