= SEMTA Commuter Rail =

Former commuter rail line in Detroit, Michigan

Silver Streak
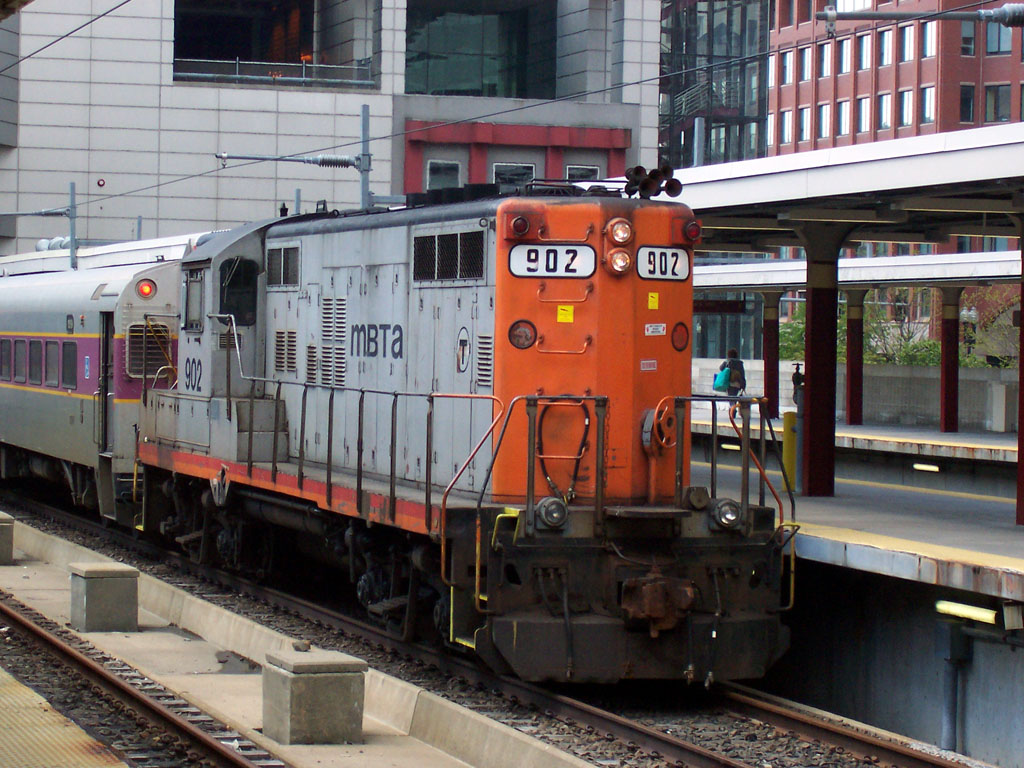
- MBTA EMD GP9 #902 at South Station in Boston, Massachusetts, in 2006, still in SEMTA orange-and-gray. Now preserved at the Illinois Railway Museum

Overview
- Predecessor: Grand Trunk Western Railroad commuter services
- First service: January 2, 1974
- Last service: October 17, 1983
- Former operator: SEMTA

SEMTA Commuter Rail, also known as the Silver Streak, was a commuter train operated by the Southeastern Michigan Transportation Authority (SEMTA) and the Grand Trunk Western Railroad between Detroit and Pontiac, Michigan. It began in 1974 when SEMTA assumed control of the Grand Trunk's existing commuter trains over the route. SEMTA discontinued operations in 1983. Amtrak began offering intercity service between Detroit and Pontiac in 1994 as part of its Michigan Services.

== History ==
=== Grand Trunk ===
Passenger rail service between Detroit and Pontiac dated back to 1843 with the completion of the Detroit and Pontiac Railroad, the second railroad (after the Erie and Kalamazoo Railroad) to operate trains in the state of Michigan. The Grand Trunk Western Railroad, a subsidiary of the Canadian National Railway, began offering commuter service on August 1, 1931. In 1968 the Grand Trunk operated six daily commuter trains (three round-trips) between the two cities. Average daily ridership was 2,812. By 1971 the Grand Trunk estimated yearly losses at $241,626, leading it to contemplate increasing fares or canceling the trains altogether. Both options would require the approval of the Michigan Public Service Commission. The coming of Amtrak and end of most private-sector intercity passenger service was then three weeks away but commuter trains were considered separate services and remained in private operation after May 1, 1971.

=== SEMTA ===
The Michigan Legislature passed the Metropolitan Transportation Authorities Act of 1967, which included the creation of Southeastern Michigan Transportation Authority (SEMTA). SEMTA was charged to take over the ownership and operations of the fractured regional transit systems in Wayne, Oakland, Macomb, Washtenaw, St. Clair, and Monroe counties, including the city of Detroit. On January 2, 1974, SEMTA began subsidizing one-third of the losses of the commuter trains This subsidy increased to two-thirds in 1977, with SEMTA formally acquiring the rolling stock and taking full responsibility for losses in 1978. In 1975 service consisted of three rush hour trips between Pontiac and Detroit, supplemented by a single evening rush hour trip from Detroit to Birmingham, Michigan. The Birmingham train ended in spring 1976. Average train capacity in 1979 stood at 250 passengers. SEMTA operated a pair of special trains in 1982 for Super Bowl XVI, running from the newly completed Renaissance Center to Pontiac, near the Pontiac Silverdome. One carried the CBS production crew; the other was chartered by a "private tour group". In 1981 daily ridership stood at 3,000.

SEMTA's April 1983 timetable featured a stylized NYC Hudson locomotive on its cover and it continued to operate three weekday rush-hour round-trips, but all was not well. By the fall of 1983 SEMTA faced a $16 million budget shortfall and aging equipment. SEMTA estimated the cost of operating the commuter train at $1 million per year. Unable to secure funding for the train from local communities, SEMTA decided to discontinue the trains amid other cutbacks. The last train ran on October 17, 1983. SEMTA leased 22 passenger cars to the Metro-North Railroad for $320,000 per year. The five EMD GP9 diesel locomotives were stored and later sold to the Massachusetts Bay Transportation Authority. A year after discontinuance SEMTA estimated start-up costs at $1–2 million.

=== Expansion politics ===
Throughout the 1970s and early 1980s SEMTA attempted to expand its commuter rail network as part of an integrated regional transit plan. These efforts failed because of funding problems and political disagreement.

In 1974 the Southeast Michigan Council of Governments (SEMCOG) and SEMTA rolled out a transit plan for rapid transit, bus rapid transit, people movers, and improved commuter rail. It included improvements for existing services on the Grand Trunk route to Pontiac and the Penn Central route to Ann Arbor, but not the Chesapeake and Ohio Railway (C&O) route via Plymouth. The plan would cost $6.2 billion.

SEMTA unveiled a smaller plan in 1977 for $1.2 billion in transit projects, to be partially funded by the federal government. This plan included two rapid transit lines, three bus rapid transit lines, the Detroit People Mover, and upgrades to existing bus routes. For commuter rail SEMTA allocated $42 million, both for the existing Pontiac route and to create service from Detroit to Ann Arbor and Port Huron, but not Plymouth. The system would total 120 miles (190 km).

In 1979 the Michigan Department of Transportation commissioned a $350,000 feasibility study for the revival of passenger service over the C&O between Detroit and Lansing, the state capital. In 1947 the C&O's famed Pere Marquettes covered the distance in an hour and a half. The study included commuter rail service to Plymouth, a distance of 24 miles (39 km). SEMTA, as in 1974, was non-committal, believing the C&O route "too congested" with freight traffic and preferring to establish service through Wayne County to Ann Arbor over the former Penn Central route, which was now owned by Conrail. It was anticipated at that time that SEMTA would assume operation of the existing Ann Arbor commuter service, then operated by Amtrak, by 1984.

In 1981 SEMTA formally proposed a Detroit–Ann Arbor commuter service, operating over the Conrail route. This route already saw three Amtrak intercity trains per day, plus the Amtrak-operated Detroit–Ann Arbor Michigan Executive commuter train, like SEMTA a holdover from private operation. SEMTA proposed Conrail would operate the service under contract, with a minimum of eight round-trips per day. The Detroit terminus would be a new station near Joe Louis Arena.

=== Amtrak revival ===
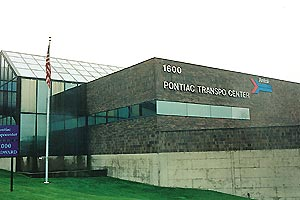
The Pontiac Transportation Center in 2002. It has since been demolished.

Passenger rail service resumed over the Grand Trunk on May 5, 1994, when Amtrak extended the Chicago–Detroit trains Twilight Limited and Wolverine to Pontiac. With this change service began at a new station in Detroit's New Center, near the old commuter stop at Milwaukee Junction. In Pontiac Amtrak used the Pontiac Transportation Center, originally constructed for the SEMTA commuter service but which had opened just six months prior to discontinuance.

== Route ==
SEMTA operated a single line from Detroit to Pontiac, running parallel to Woodward Avenue. In Detroit trains used a small station at St. Antoine and Franklin near site of Brush Street Station, which was demolished in 1973 to make way for the Renaissance Center (later SEMTA timetables simply indicated "Renaissance Center" as the Detroit terminus). Outbound stops included Milwaukee Junction, the Chrysler Center in Highland Park, Ferndale at 9 Mile Road, Royal Oak (at 11 Mile Road and at 12 Mile Road), Birmingham, Bloomfield Hills (at Charing Cross Road and at Long Lake Road), and finally Pontiac. The total distance was 26.3 miles (42.3 km).

== Equipment ==
SEMTA owned a pool of 23 steam-heated passenger coaches; 12 of these were originally from the Pennsylvania Railroad (PRR) and the other 11 from the Union Pacific Railroad. Refit for commuter service each coach could seat 92. In May 1976 SEMTA acquired the old PRR Keystone trainset (the so-called "tubular train") from Amtrak for $80,000 but this equipment did not enter service. The Grand Trunk employed both EMD GP9 and EMD GP18 locomotives for motive power.

== Legacy ==
SEMTA GP9 #902 would be transferred to the Massachusetts Bay Transportation Authority (MBTA) in 1987, where it retained much of its signature SEMTA orange-and-gray paint scheme. It served on passenger lines and later on ballast/track-maintenance trains around Boston before being retired indefinitely in 2004. It would later be donated to the Illinois Railway Museum in 2015 for preservation.

== See also ==
- Michigan Executive: defunct Detroit–Ann Arbor commuter service
- SEMCOG Commuter Rail: proposed Detroit–Ann Arbor commuter service
