= Troy station =

Troy station could refer to:

- Troy Transit Center, a train and bus station in Troy, Michigan
- Union Station (Troy, New York), a former train station in Troy, New York
- Troy station (Virginia), a former station in Troy, Virginia
