= John D. Dingell Transit Center =

Intermodal train and bus station in Michigan

John D. Dingell Transit Center Dearborn, MI
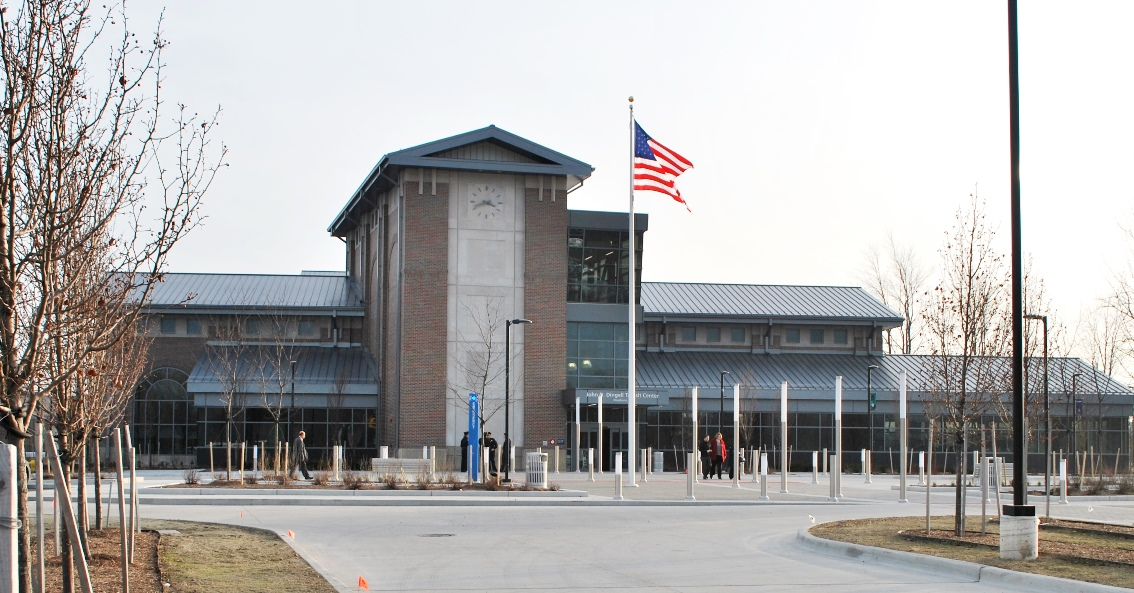
- The John D. Dingell Transit Center, one week after opening in Dearborn, Michigan

General information
- Location: 21201 Michigan Avenue; Dearborn, Michigan; United States
- Coordinates: 42°18′25″N 83°14′05″W
- Owner: City of Dearborn
- Line: MDOT Michigan Line
- Platforms: 2 side platforms
- Tracks: 2
- Connections: SMART FAST Michigan; SMART 140, 160, 200, 210, 250

Construction
- Parking: Yes; free
- Accessible: Yes

Other information
- Station code: Amtrak: DER

History
- Opened: July 23, 1978
- Rebuilt: October 1, 1979 (original station building); December 9, 2014 (current station building)

Passengers
- FY 2025: 67,715 (Amtrak)

Services
Preceding station	Amtrak	Following station
Ann Arbor toward Chicago	Wolverine	Detroit toward Pontiac
Former services
Preceding station	Amtrak	Following station
Ann Arbor toward Chicago	Lake Cities 1980–2004	Detroit toward Pontiac
Ypsilanti toward Jackson	Michigan Executive	Detroit (Michigan Central) Terminus
Location

The John D. Dingell Transit Center, also known as the Dearborn Transit Center, is an intermodal transit station in Dearborn, Michigan. It is served by Amtrak's Wolverine line as well as Suburban Mobility Authority for Regional Transportation (SMART) buses. The station is named after former U.S. Representative John Dingell.

== Description ==
The station is located at 21201 Michigan Avenue (US Highway 12). The red brick and glass-faced structure includes a two-story waiting hall, which includes an elevated glass-enclosed pedestrian bridge which allows access to the south platform. There is also a small retail space within the station.

== History ==
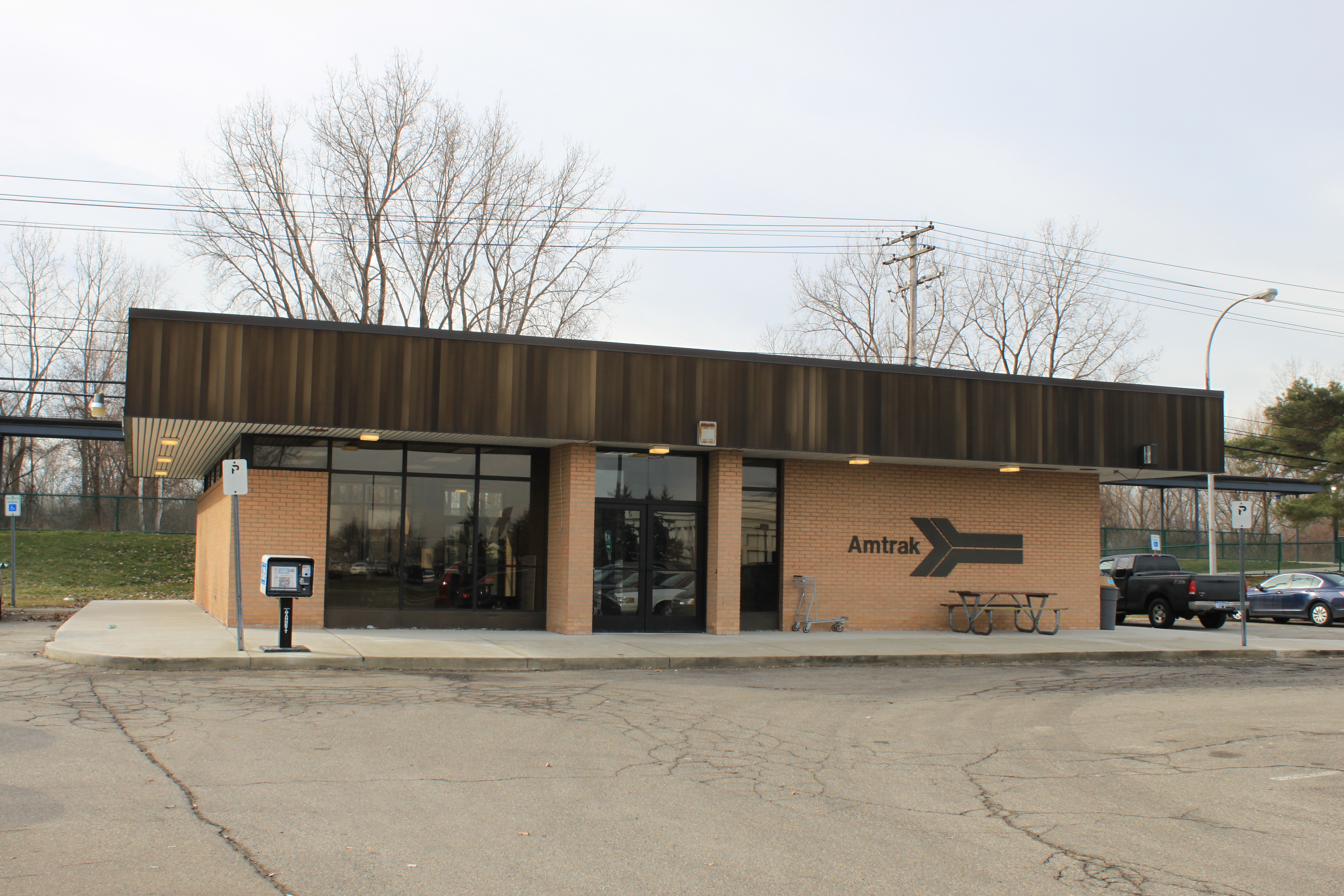
Old Amtrak building

The original Michigan Central Railroad station was located at Monroe Street. In February 1887 a new station replaced the previous one. The station was razed in the 1950s and was not replaced. By the time Amtrak took over intercity service in May 1971, Michigan Central successor Penn Central did not have a station stop at Dearborn for intercity or commuter trains.

The station was established in 1978 with the goal of Detroit's western suburban residents' access to passenger trains. A station with a temporary structure opened July 30, 1978. A permanent station building opened on October 1, 1979, replacing the temporary structure. The station was built on property deeded to the city by the Ford Motor Company. The construction cost $348,000, which was split between Amtrak and the state of Michigan. It was of an Amtrak standard station design.

On August 19, 2011, it was announced that the Federal Railroad Administration had released $28.2 million in funds from the ARRA economic stimulus package for the construction of a new intermodal station to replace the current building; the new facility would serve both intercity and commuter rail and include a new entrance to The Henry Ford museum complex adjacent to it.

The new 16,000-square-foot (1,500 m^{2}) station was officially opened for service on 10 December 2014, and consolidates the old station and the Greenfield Village station.

A group called Pockets of Perception, made up of ten students of Dearborn senior high schools, created a 18-by-20-foot (5.5 m × 6.1 m) mosaic, titled "Transformations," on display in the station's lobby.

== Connections ==
- Suburban Mobility Authority for Regional Transportation; Routes 140, 160, 200, 210, 250, and FAST 261. SMART's on-demand Flex service also serves the station and the surrounding area.

== See also ==
Other stations that recently were demolished and replaced with a newer building.

- Schenectady station
- Rochester station
- Buffalo–Exchange Street station
- Niagara Falls station (New York)
- Anaheim station
- Bloomington-Normal station
- Tacoma station/Tacoma Dome station
