= Greenfield Village station =

Former railway station in Dearborn, Michigan

Greenfield Village
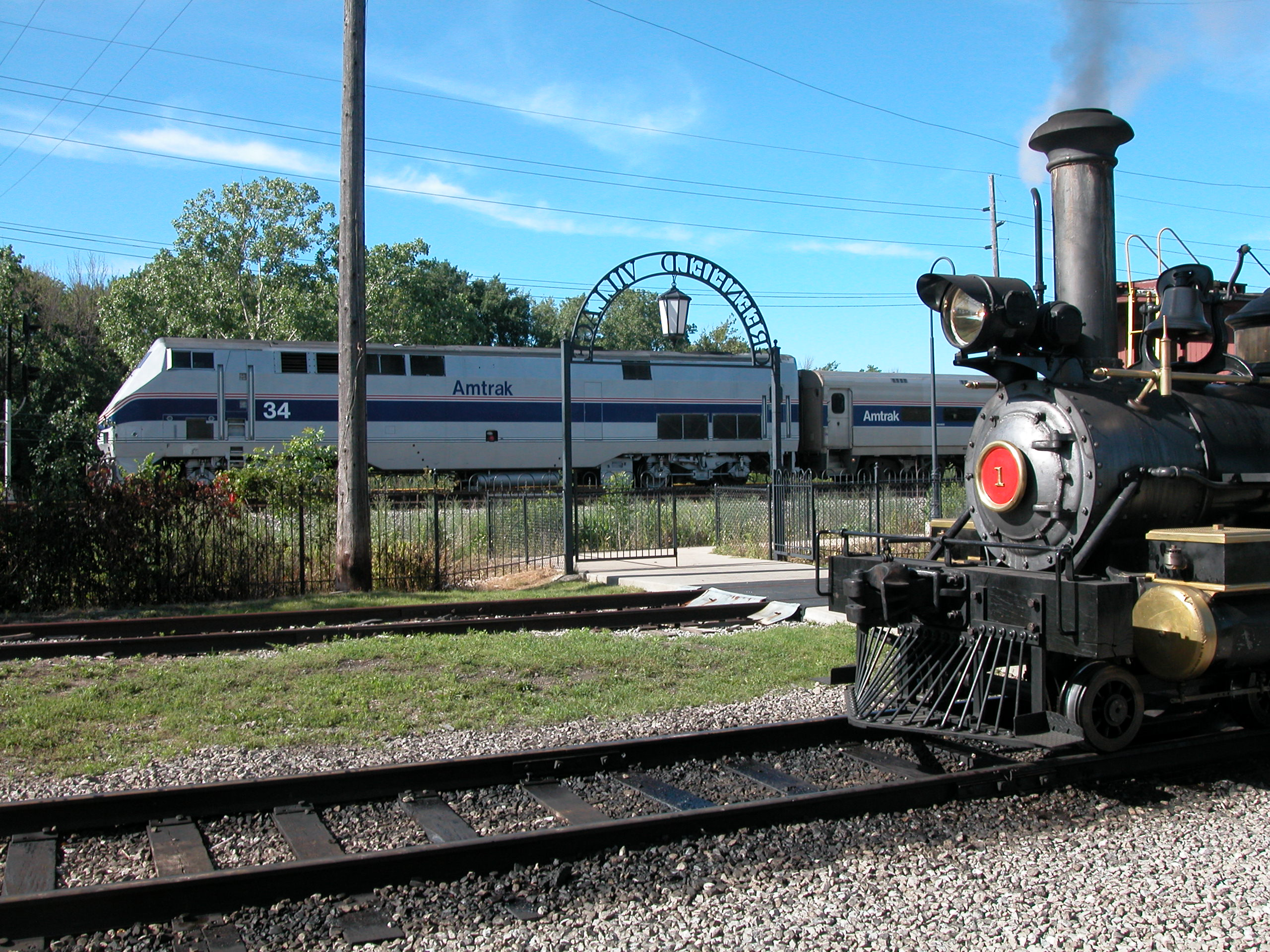

General information
- Location: 20900 Oakwood Boulevard; Dearborn, Michigan; United States
- Coordinates: 42.3078°N 83.2282°W
- Line: Michigan Line
- Platforms: 1 side platform
- Tracks: 2
- Connections: Weiser Railroad

Construction
- Accessible: Yes

Other information
- Station code: GFV

History
- Opened: 1929
- Closed: April 24, 2006 (regular service); December 10, 2014 (conditional service)

Former services
Preceding station	Amtrak	Following station
Ann Arbor toward Chicago	Wolverine	Dearborn toward Pontiac
Location

Greenfield Village was an Amtrak station in Dearborn, Michigan served by the Wolverine. It closed to regular seasonal service in 2006 and to all service in 2014. The station had a single side platform serving one of the two tracks of the Michigan Line. A pedestrian crossing from the platform led to The Henry Ford at Smiths Creek Depot on the parallel Weiser Railroad.

== History ==
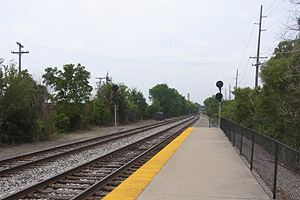
The closed platform in 2015

Prior to 2006, the station was a regular, but seasonal stop (summer only). After 2006, the station was only used for reserved tour groups of 20 or more people, similar to Colonel Allensworth State Historic Park station in California.

Amtrak's main station in Dearborn, opened in 1978, was located well east of the downtown area, thus requiring a separate stop to serve The Henry Ford. Dearborn station and Greenfield Village station were replaced by the new John D. Dingell Transit Center, located 0.4 miles (0.64 km) to the west of Greenfield Village station at a different entrance to The Henry Ford. The new station opened on December 10, 2014, and Greenfield Village station was closed.
