= Michigan Services =

Three Amtrak passenger rail routes operating between Chicago and Michigan

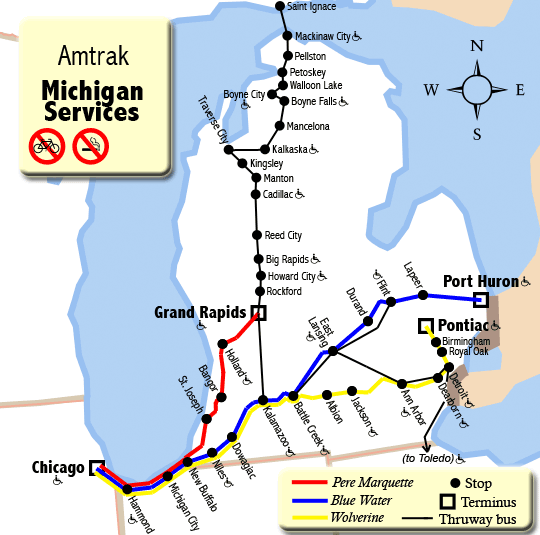
Map of Amtrak routes in Michigan.

Michigan Services are three state-supported Amtrak passenger rail routes connecting Chicago, Illinois with the Michigan cities of Grand Rapids, Port Huron, and Pontiac, and stations en route. The group falls under the Amtrak Midwest brand and is a component of the Midwest Regional Rail Initiative.

The Michigan Services routes are:

- Blue Water (364/365): Chicago to Port Huron, Michigan
- Pere Marquette (370/371): Chicago to Grand Rapids, Michigan
- Wolverine (350/351/352/353/354/355): Chicago to Pontiac, Michigan

The routes carried 633,231 passengers during fiscal year 2022.

Up until fiscal year 2014, the State of Michigan only subsidized the operations of the Pere Marquette and Blue Water at a cost of $8 million in fiscal year 2014. Starting fiscal year 2014, the state took on the costs of operations for the Wolverine pushing the state subsidy to $25 million.

No checked baggage service is available on Michigan Services routes.

== History ==
When Amtrak was founded in 1971, five private companies provided inter-city passenger service in Michigan: the Baltimore & Ohio (B&O), the Chesapeake & Ohio (C&O), the Grand Trunk Western, the Norfolk & Western, and Penn Central. Services provided:

Company	Route	Name	Notes
Baltimore & Ohio	Detroit—Cincinnati	Cincinnatian	
Chesapeake & Ohio	Chicago—Grand Rapids	Pere Marquette	
Chesapeake & Ohio	Holland—Muskegon	Pere Marquette connection	
Chesapeake & Ohio	Grand Rapids—Detroit	Pere Marquette	Two round-trips daily
Chesapeake & Ohio	Ashland—Detroit	George Washington connection	Weekend-only
Grand Trunk Western	Chicago—Port Huron	formerly the International Limited	
Grand Trunk Western	Chicago—Toronto	Maple Leaf	
Grand Trunk Western	Chicago—Detroit	Mohawk	
Norfolk & Western	St. Louis—Detroit	Wabash Cannon Ball	
Penn Central	Chicago—Detroit—Buffalo	formerly the Motor City Special	
Penn Central	Chicago—Detroit—Buffalo	formerly the Wolverine	Until 1967, four years earlier: eastern terminus: New York City
Penn Central	Chicago—Detroit	formerly the Michigan and Twilight Limited	

Upon taking over national passenger rail service on May 1, 1971, Amtrak discontinued almost all of these, keeping just two round-trips on the Penn Central's Chicago—Detroit line. Detroit lost its direct connections to St Louis, Cincinnati, Buffalo and the Canadian province of Ontario. On its first new timetable, issued on November 14, 1971, Amtrak bestowed names on these trains: the Wolverine and the St. Clair. In mid-May Amtrak announced a Toledo, Ohio—Detroit connection to the new Chicago—New York Lake Shore with financial support from the state of Michigan; this train was canceled before it ran because of poor track conditions between the two cities.

=== Turboliners ===
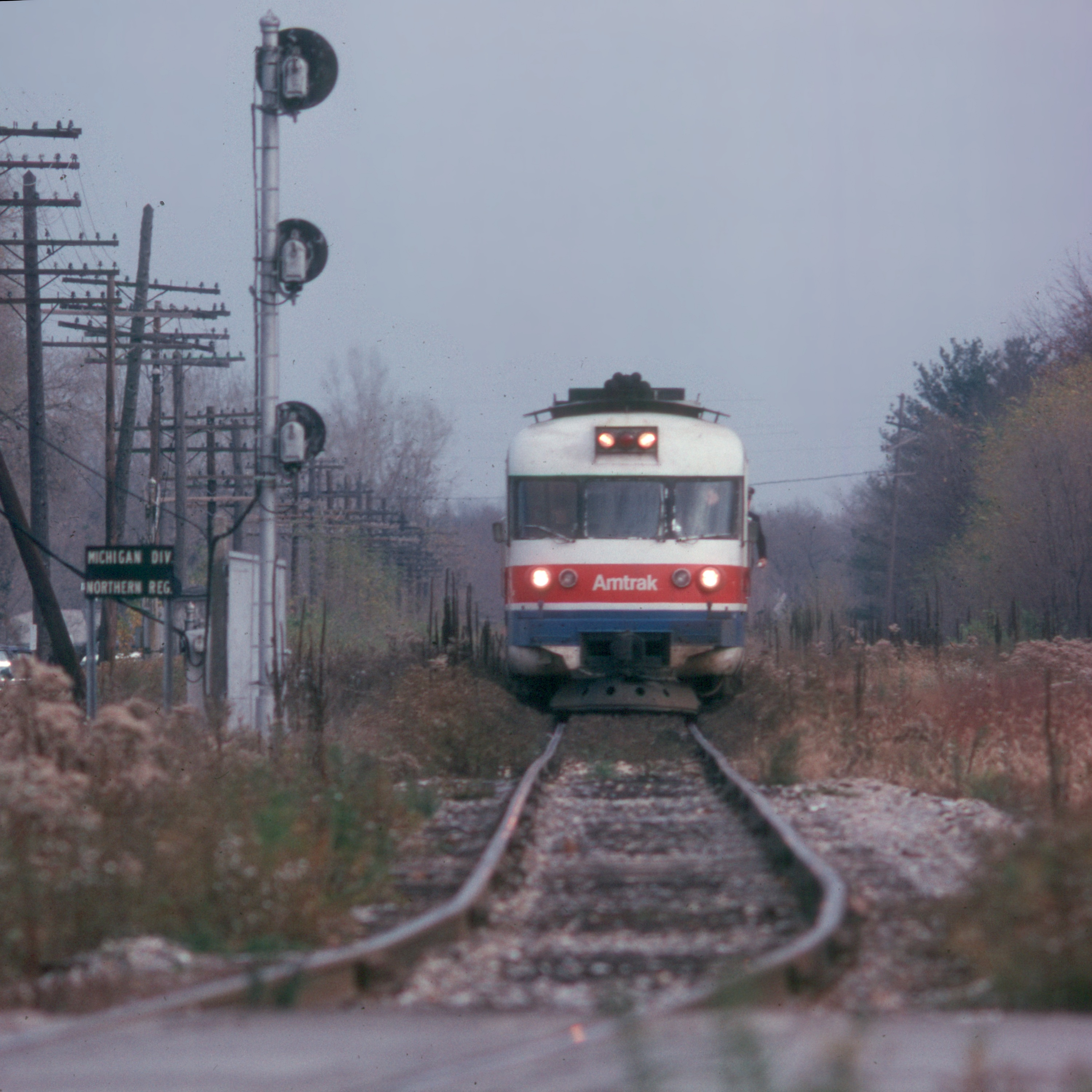
A Turboliner at Porter, Indiana in 1977.

On April 10, 1975, Amtrak introduced French-built Turboliner equipment to the Michigan route. Amtrak added a third round-trip to the corridor on April 27. A pool of three Turboliner trainsets served the route, and the three round-trip pairs were numbered 350—355, which are still in use today. Amtrak dropped the individual train names and rebranded all three Turboliner, in common with similar services to St. Louis, Missouri and Milwaukee, Wisconsin. The new equipment led to massive gains in ridership, topping 340,000 in 1975 and 370,000 in 1976.

The Turboliners became a victim of their own success. Although fast (and flashy), they were unable to reach their design speed of 125 mph (201 km/h) because of the poor quality of the Penn Central track in Michigan. The five-car fixed consists had a maximum capacity of 292 passengers, which was often not enough. Starting in March 1976 Amtrak began replacing some of the Turboliners with conventional equipment, including new Amfleet coaches. Individual names returned to the corridor, with the heretofore unnamed third train becoming the Twilight Limited. The last Turboliners left the corridor in 1981.

=== Blue Water ===
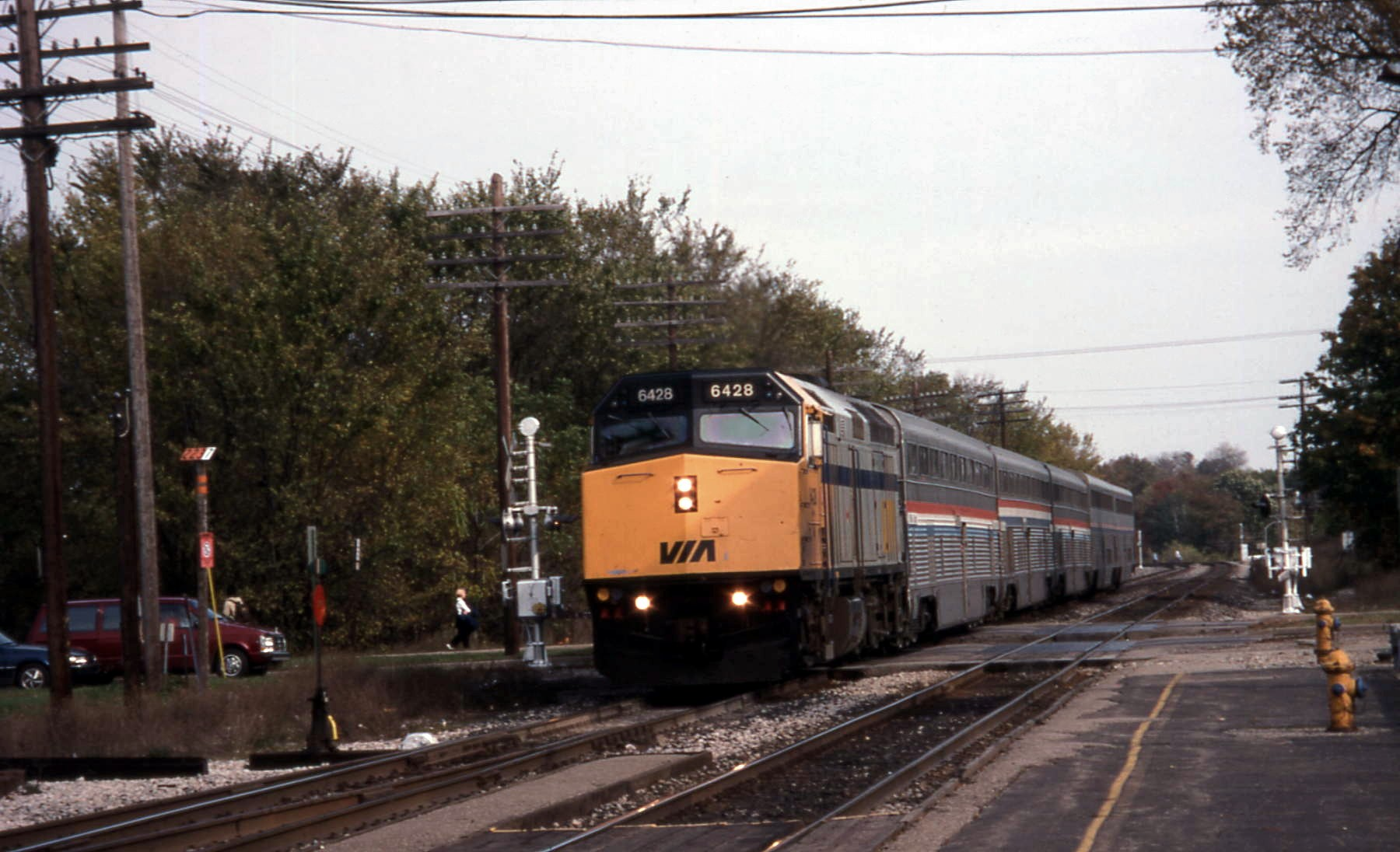
A Via Rail EMD F40PH leads the International into East Lansing in 1996.

Amtrak restored service to the Grand Trunk Western northeast of Battle Creek on September 15, 1974, with the inauguration of the Blue Water. This train originated at Port Huron and served Lapeer, Flint, Durand, and East Lansing before joining the Chicago—Detroit trains at Battle Creek and continuing to Chicago. The state of Michigan spent $1 million on track rehabilitation. Amtrak renamed the train the Blue Water Limited on October 26, 1975, and it used Turboliners 1976—1981.

Michigan, Amtrak and the Canadian province of Ontario had discussed restoring Port Huron—Toronto service since 1973; this finally occurred on October 31, 1982, with the extension of the Blue Water Limited, which was renamed the International Limited (later shortened to International). Amtrak and Via Rail, the state-supported Canadian rail company, jointly operated the International until April 25, 2004, when cross-border service was discontinued: massive border delays post-September 11 led to falling ridership. Amtrak and Michigan agreed to truncate service at Port Huron and bring back the old Blue Water.

=== Pontiac and Toledo ===
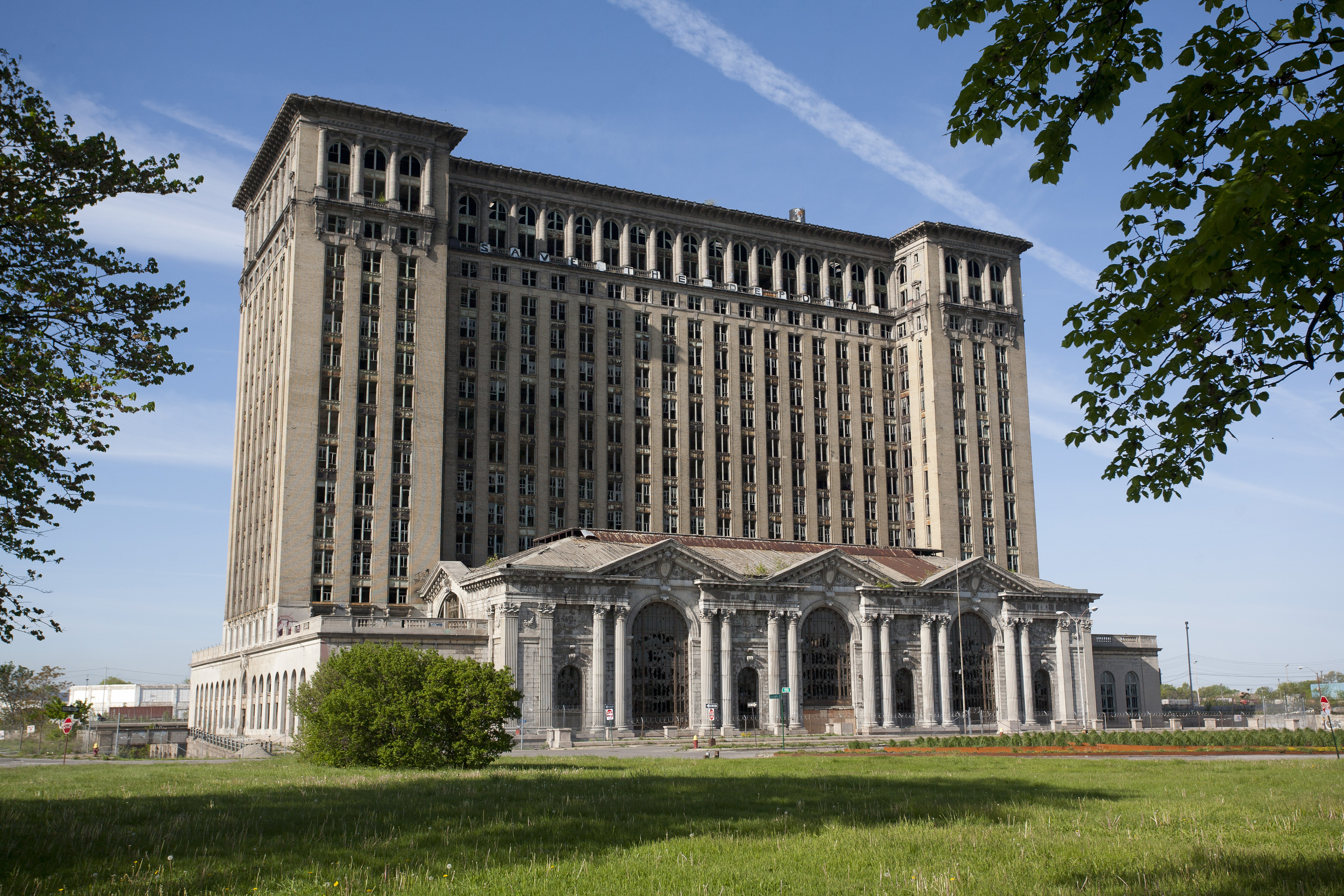
The Michigan Central Station hosted Amtrak in Detroit 1971—1988; trains continued to serve the area through 1994.

On August 3, 1980, Amtrak extended the St Clair, the midday Chicago—Detroit train, to Toledo, Ohio. The train was renamed the Lake Cities and continued to use Turboliner trainsets until mid-1981. The Lake Cities schedule allowed both east- and westbound connections with the Chicago—New York Lake Shore Limited, eliminating the need for Michigan travelers to backtrack through Chicago. Budget cuts led Amtrak to discontinue service to Toledo on April 1, 1995.

Amtrak extended the Wolverine and Twilight Limited to Pontiac on May 5, 1994. With this change service began at a new station in Detroit's New Center. Although the Michigan Central Station in Corktown, Detroit had closed on January 6, 1988, trains continued to stop at a temporary platform just east of the old station. Besides Pontiac, new stations were opened at Royal Oak and Birmingham. The Lake Cities also began serving Pontiac after the end of Toledo service in 1995.

=== Pere Marquette ===
Amtrak considered two routes for a Chicago—Grand Rapids train: the Chesapeake and Ohio Railway (ex-Pere Marquette Railway), which ran along the Lake Michigan coastline and joined the main Chicago—Detroit line at Porter, Indiana; and a Conrail (ex-Pennsylvania Railroad) route via Kalamazoo. Although the Conrail route was faster, a dispute over costs led to the selection of the C&O route. Service began August 5, 1984, with stops at Grand Rapids, Holland, Bangor, St Joseph, New Buffalo and Hammond-Whiting. Like the Blue Water, the Pere Marquette receives financial support from the state of Michigan.

== Track ==
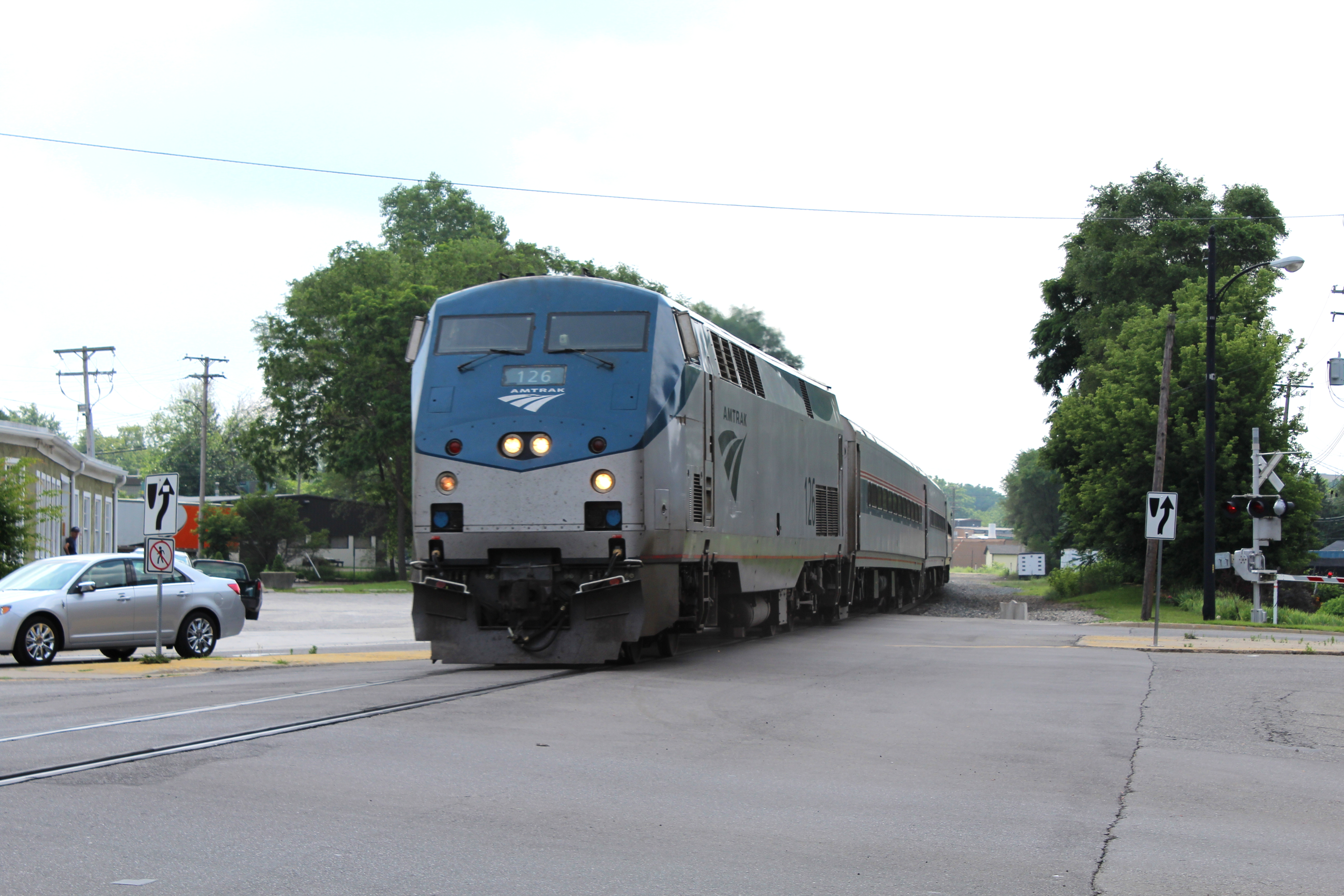
The Wolverine passes through Ypsilanti on the old Michigan Central main line, now owned by the Michigan DOT.

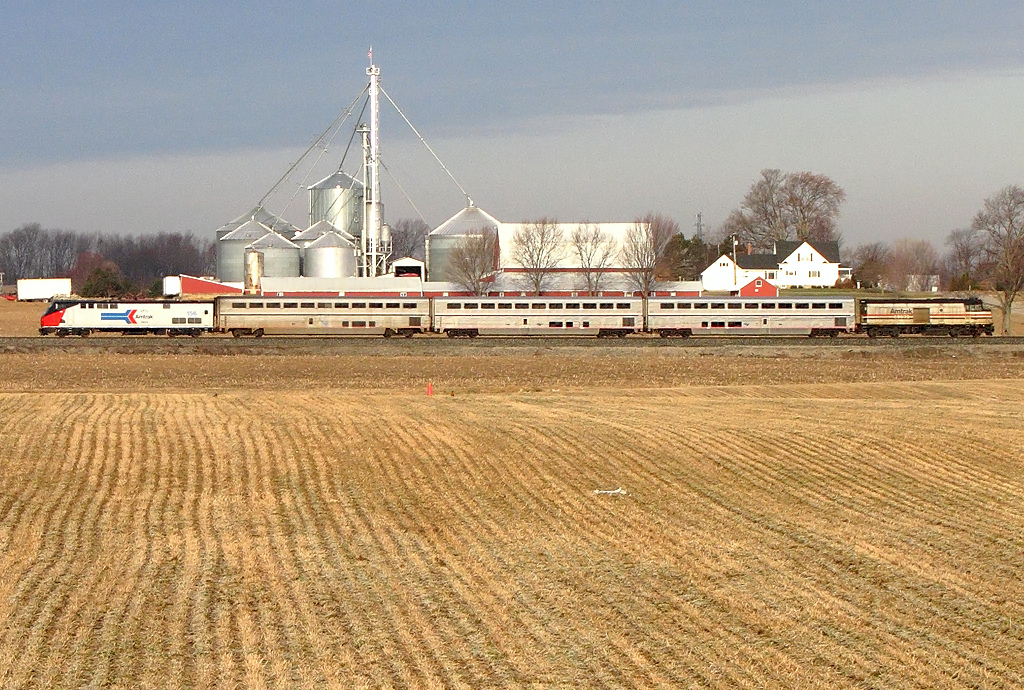
The Pere Marquette passing a farm south of Holland on the old Pere Marquette Railway, now CSX.

The tracks used were originally part of the Pennsylvania Railroad, New York Central Railroad, Grand Trunk Railway and Pere Marquette Railway systems, and are now owned by CSX, Norfolk Southern, Canadian National, Conrail and Amtrak. The following lines are used:

=== Blue Water ===
- Grand Trunk Western Railway (GT), Battle Creek, Michigan (on the Michigan Central Railroad east of Kalamazoo) to Port Huron, Michigan, now CN

=== Pere Marquette ===
- Pere Marquette Railway, Porter, Indiana to Grand Rapids, Michigan, now CSX

=== Wolverine ===
- Pittsburgh, Fort Wayne and Chicago Railway (PRR), Chicago, Illinois to Whiting, Indiana, now NS
- Lake Shore and Michigan Southern Railway (NYC), Whiting to Porter, Indiana, now NS
- Michigan Central Railroad (NYC), Porter to Detroit, Michigan, Amtrak between Porter IN and Kalamazoo MI to the west and MDOT d/b/a Amtrak from Kalamazoo MI to Dearborn, minus CN track through Battle Creek and Conrail in Detroit
- Detroit, Grand Haven and Milwaukee Railway (GT), Detroit to Pontiac, Michigan, now CN

== Proposed improvements ==
=== High-speed rail ===
The Detroit-Chicago corridor has been designated by the Federal Railroad Administration as a high-speed rail corridor. A 97-mile (156 km) stretch along the route of Blue Water and Wolverine from Porter, Indiana to Kalamazoo, Michigan is the longest segment of track owned by Amtrak outside of the Northeast Corridor. Amtrak began speed increases along this stretch in January 2002 to 95 mph (153 km/h) between Niles and Kalamazoo. Increases to 110 mph (180 km/h) were first approved along the corridor in February 2011 between Porter and Kalamazoo. On May 25, 2021, the federally approved accelerated-speed rule went into effect along the corridor from Kalamazoo to Albion.

=== Expansion ===
The Michigan Department of Transportation has petitioned Amtrak to add a daily train between Chicago and Kalamazoo, departing Chicago in late evening and returning from Kalamazoo in the morning. Amtrak operated an extra frequency during the Labor Day weekend in 2010. The trains, 356–357, left Kalamazoo at 5:50 am and returned from Chicago at 10:00 pm. In 2013 Amtrak ran special holiday trains, numbers 356 & 359 out of Chicago to Ann Arbor. These trains arrived in Ann Arbor at 3pm and departed west an hour later at 4pm. There are proposals to establish passenger service between Detroit and Grand Rapids via Lansing.
