= Detroit station =

Train station in Michigan, United States

Detroit, MI
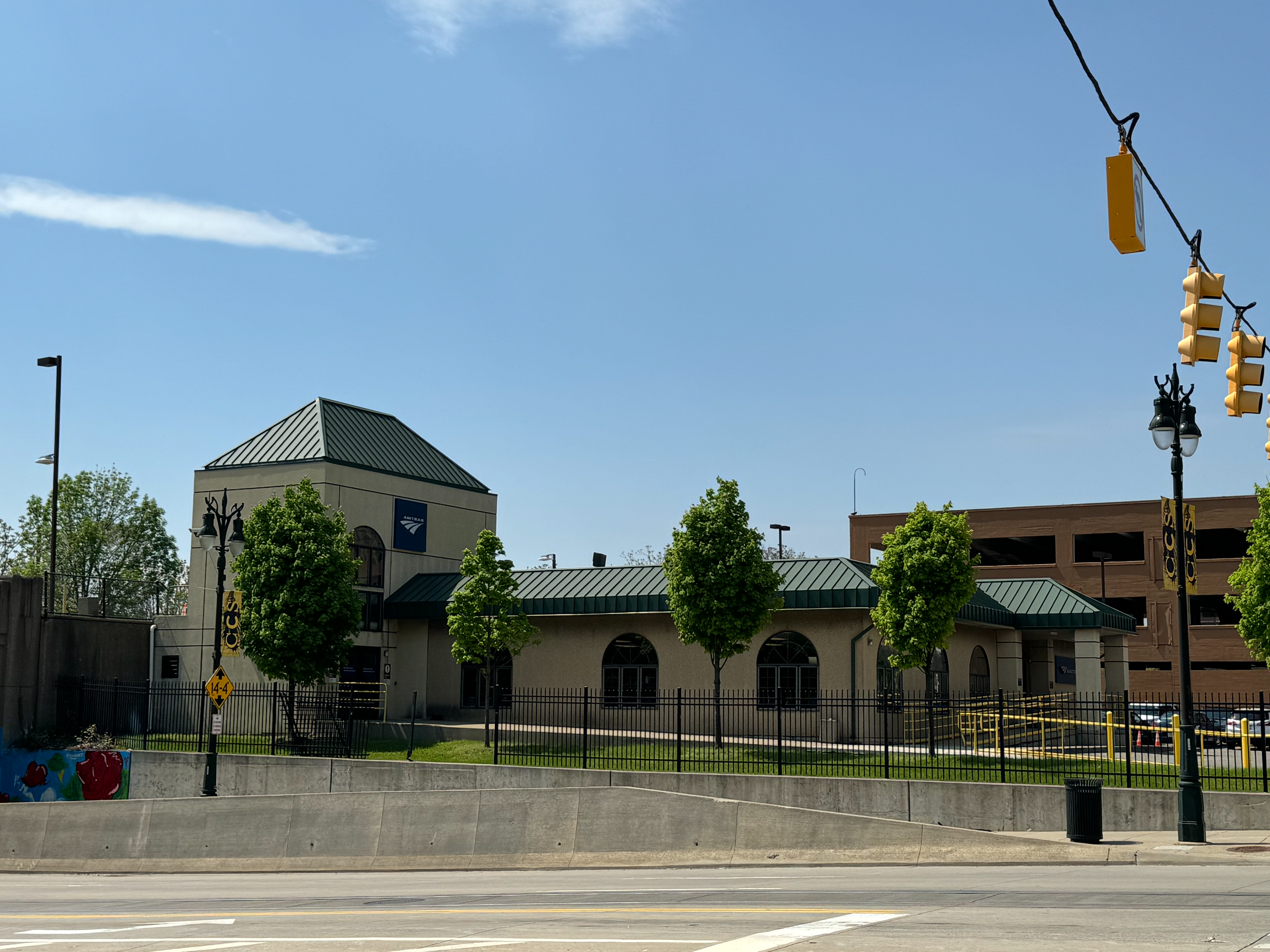
- The station building in Detroit.

General information
- Location: 11 West Baltimore Avenue; Detroit, Michigan; United States
- Coordinates: 42°22′04″N 83°04′21″W
- Owner: Michigan Department of Transportation
- Line: CN Shore Line Subdivision
- Platforms: 1 side platform
- Tracks: 2
- Connections: QLine Baltimore Street; Amtrak Thruway; DDOT 4, 16; SMART FAST Woodward 461, 462; SMART 851

Construction
- Parking: Short-term only; free
- Accessible: Yes

Other information
- Station code: Amtrak: DET

History
- Opened: May 5, 1994

Passengers
- FY 2025: 74,610 (Amtrak)

Services
Preceding station	Amtrak	Following station
Dearborn toward Chicago	Wolverine	Royal Oak toward Pontiac
Preceding station	QLine	Following station
Grand Boulevard Terminus	QLine transfer at Baltimore Street	Amsterdam Street toward Congress Street
Former services
Preceding station	Amtrak	Following station
Dearborn toward Chicago	Lake Cities 1995–2004	Royal Oak toward Pontiac
Dearborn toward Chicago	Lake Cities 1980–1995	Toledo Terminus
Location
- Location within Michigan Location within the United States

Detroit station is an intermodal transit station in Detroit, Michigan. Located in New Center, the facility currently serves Amtrak and QLine streetcars. It also serves as a stop for Greyhound Lines, Detroit Department of Transportation buses, SMART and buses. Baltimore Street station, in the median of Woodward Avenue, serves streetcars to Midtown and Downtown. It is located at the southwest corner of Woodward and West Baltimore Avenues. Amtrak's Wolverine line serves an elevated platform at the main building.

== History ==
=== Amtrak station ===
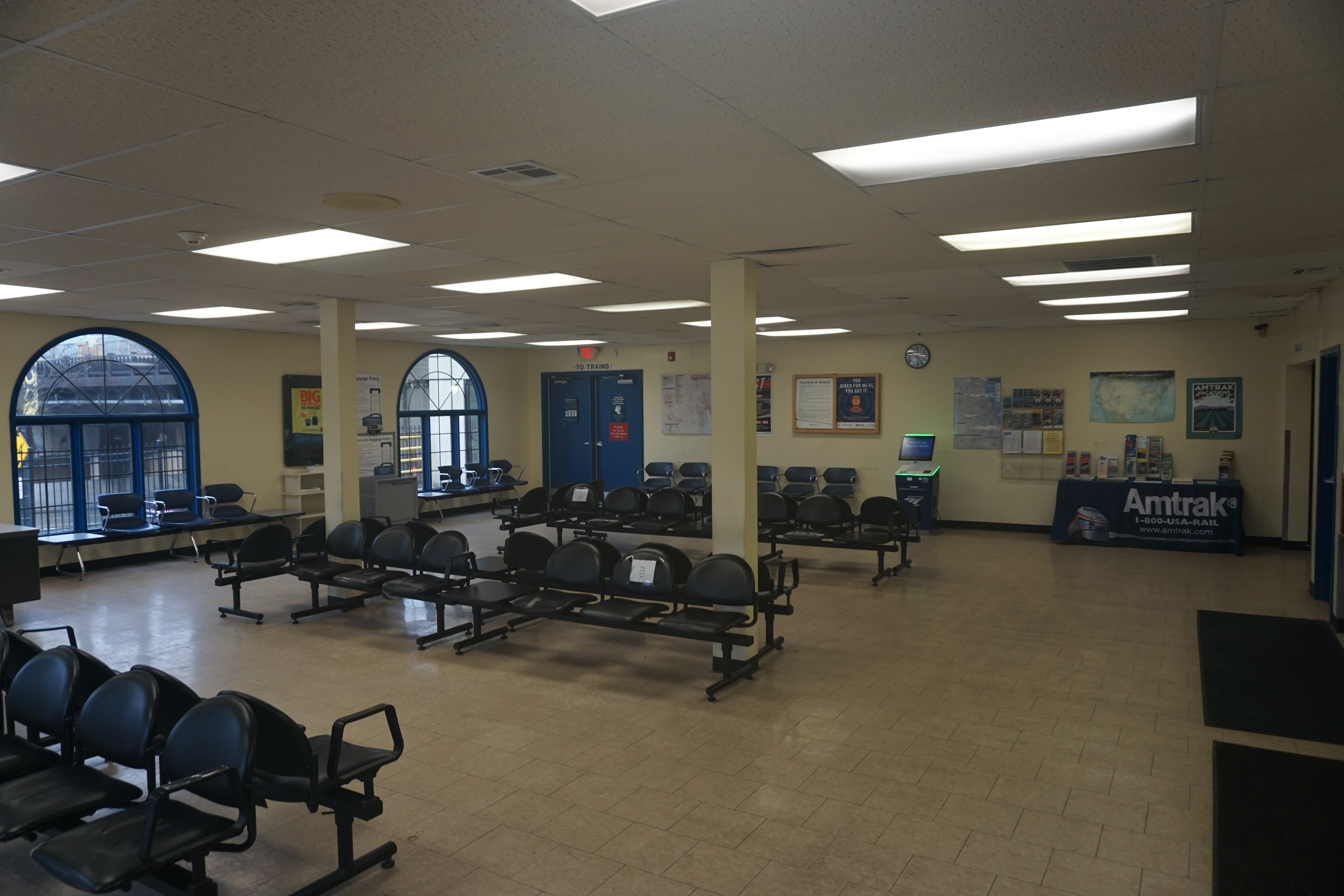
Interior of Detroit station

The Michigan Department of Transportation (MDOT) bought the 3.1 acre site of the station for $889,000 – which also includes land directly across the tracks – in 1994 from General Motors. The station was built in 1994 as a replacement for the former Michigan Central Station, which closed in 1988. From the closure of that station in 1988 until the new stations opening in 1994, services used a platform on Rose Street close to the old station.

The station consists of a one-story building which includes a waiting room, ticket office, and restrooms. The platform is accessible by a tower at the back of the building, which heads to the level of the elevated GTW Shore Line Subdivision railway.

=== QLine ===
The streetcar system, now known as QLine, opened for service on May 12, 2017, and service began for the Baltimore Street station the same day. The station is sponsored by Penske. It is heated and features security cameras and emergency phones. Passenger amenities include Wi-Fi and arrival signs.

=== Future ===
In the mid-2000s, MDOT began working with local and federal agencies to develop an intermodal transit center one block south of the current station bounded by the Conrail North Yard Branch railway to the north, Woodward to the east, Amsterdam to the south, and Cass to the west. The project was intended to bring together the services of Amtrak, DDOT, SMART, M-1 Rail (later QLine) streetcars, and future proposed services including the Woodward Avenue BRT and Ann Arbor-Detroit regional rail. The first phase was completed in 2010 consisting of clearing the site and building a surface parking lot for the future station. MDOT announced in January 2016 that the department was also seeking to partner with developers to also include mixed-use development at the site.

== See also ==
- Detroit People Mover
- SEMCOG Commuter Rail (proposed)
