= Twilight Limited =

American named passenger train (1926–1967)

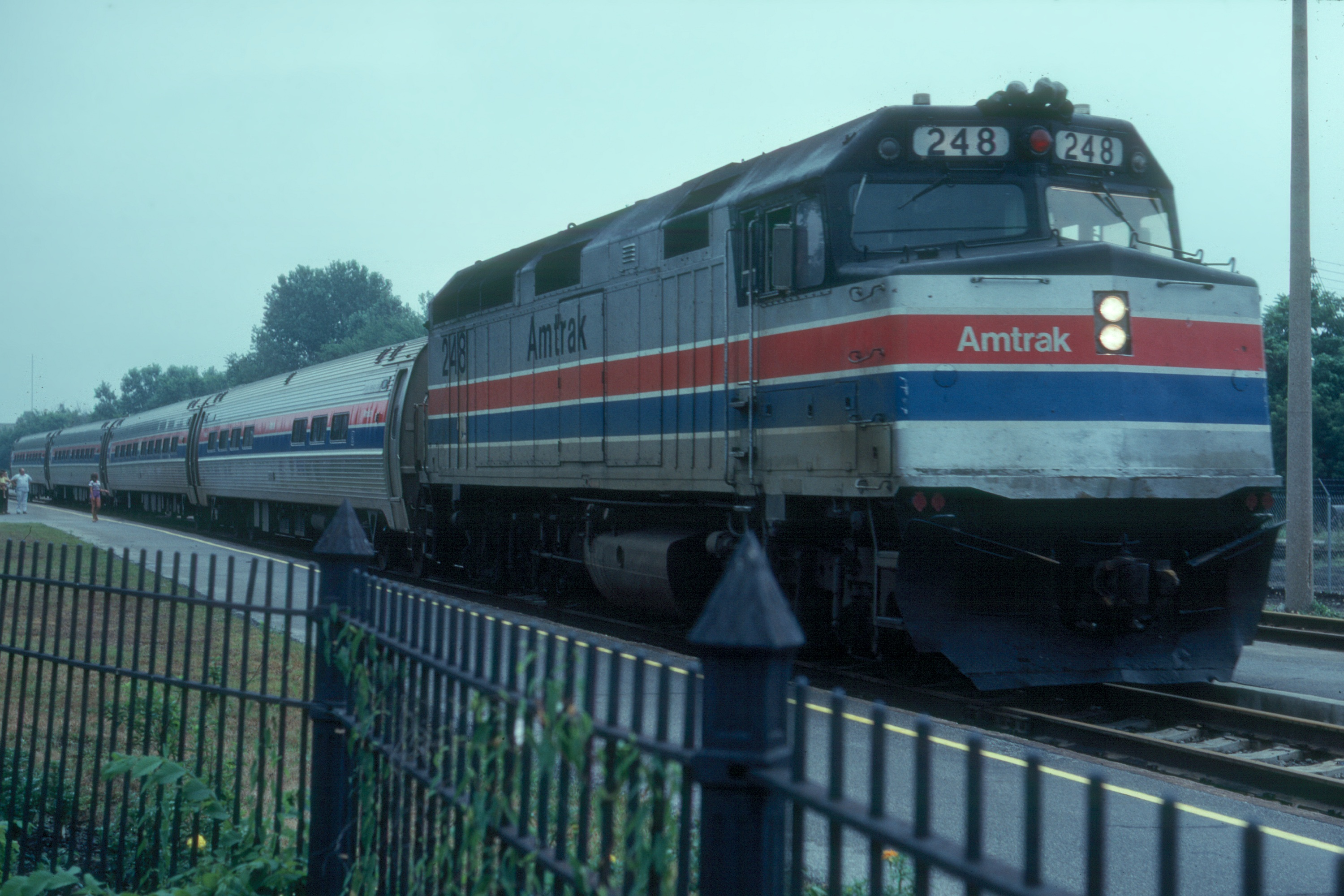
- Twilight Limited passing Niles in 1981.

Overview
- Service type: Inter-city rail
- Locale: Midwestern United States
- Last service: April 25, 2004
- Successor: Wolverine
- Former operators: Amtrak & New York Central Railroad

Route
- Termini: Chicago, Illinois; Pontiac, Michigan
- Stops: 17
- Distance travelled: 304 miles (489 km)
- Average journey time: 6 hours 20 minutes
- Service frequency: Daily
- Train numbers: 354 & 355

Technical
- Track gauge: 4 ft 8 1/2 in (1,435 mm)

The Twilight Limited was a named passenger train in the United States which initially operated between Chicago, Illinois, and Detroit, Michigan. The New York Central Railroad introduced the train in 1926, and it continued until the formation of Amtrak (the National Railroad Passenger Corporation) in 1971, although it lost its name in 1967. Amtrak renamed the train St. Clair, feeling that the name "Twilight Limited" had undesirable connotations and imagery for a company trying to save passenger rail service. Amtrak revived the name in 1976 for a new train frequency on the Chicago–Detroit corridor, and kept the name until all trains on that corridor were renamed Wolverine in 2004.

== History ==
=== New York Central ===
The New York Central Railroad introduced the Twilight Limited on April 25, 1926. The new train was first-class only, with parlor cars and a dining car. It was the fastest of the 13 New York Central (Michigan Central) trains from Chicago to Detroit, leaving Central Station at 3:00 PM and taking six hours for 283.5 miles to Detroit. After the Second World War the Twilight Limited gained coaches, but kept some parlor cars and its dining car. Service on the Chicago-Detroit route continued to drop, from seven trains each way in 1951 to five in 1960. The last parlor car came off in the mid-1960s. As part of a massive restructuring the New York Central dropped all train names on December 3, 1967, although the ex-Twilight Limited still ran. Penn Central (the merged New York Central and Pennsylvania Railroad) truncated the westbound ex-Twilight Limited at Ann Arbor, Michigan on October 5, 1968. Amtrak kept the eastbound ex-Twilight Limited (No. 356), but renamed it the St. Clair.

=== Amtrak ===
By mid-1976 Amtrak had three round-trips on the Chicago-Detroit corridor; these were all named Turboliner after the French-designed gas turbine RTG trainsets which operated on the route. Demand outstripped the trainsets' fixed capacity of 292, so Amtrak began assigning new conventional Amfleet equipment as it became available. On October 31, 1976, the evening pair of trains (#354/#355) became the Twilight Limited. This service pattern remained mostly uninterrupted until 1994, although budget problems led to the westbound Twilight Limited running tri-weekly (Friday-Sunday) between 1986 and 1990. On May 5, 1994, Amtrak extended the Twilight Limited and Wolverine to Pontiac, Michigan. In 2000, as part of its Network Growth Strategy Amtrak proposed extending the Twilight Limited to New York City, New York via Ontario, Canada and Buffalo, New York, bypassing Detroit. The last Michigan-Ontario-New York had ended in 1979 when Amtrak discontinued the Niagara Rainbow. Nothing came of this proposal, although for a time the Twilight Limited terminated at Detroit and handled additional mail and express business. On April 26, 2004, Amtrak dropped individual names on the Chicago-Detroit corridor and the Twilight Limited (along with the Lake Cities) became one of three Wolverines.
