= Troy Transit Center =

Train station

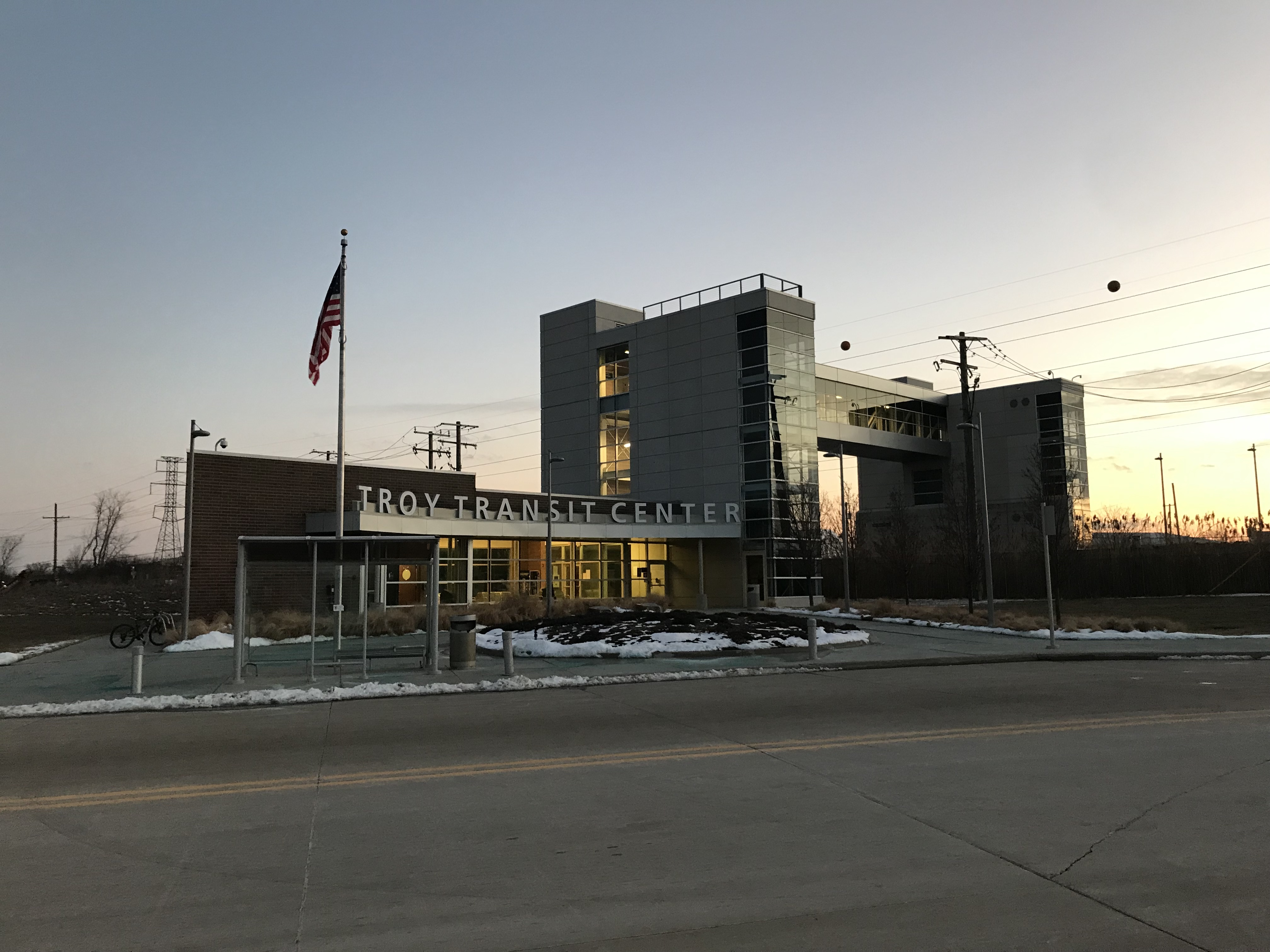
- Looking down on the Troy Transit Center

General information
- Location: 1201 Doyle Drive; Troy, Michigan; United States
- Coordinates: 42°32′33″N 83°11′28″W
- Elevation: 750 feet (230 m)
- Owner: City of Troy
- Line: GTW/CNR
- Platforms: 1 side platform
- Tracks: 2
- Bus stands: 1
- Connections: None

Construction
- Parking: 124 spaces (short and long term)
- Accessible: Yes

Other information
- Station code: Amtrak: TRM

History
- Opened: October 14, 2014

Passengers
- FY 2025: 38,237 (Amtrak)

Services
Preceding station	Amtrak	Following station
Royal Oak toward Chicago	Wolverine	Pontiac Terminus
Location

The Troy Transit Center is an unstaffed train station in Troy, Michigan, United States, that is served by Amtrak's Wolverine, which runs thrice daily between Chicago, Illinois, and Pontiac, Michigan (via Kalamazoo, Ann Arbor, and Detroit, Michigan). The transit center replaced the nearby Birmingham Amtrak station in October 2014.

== Description ==
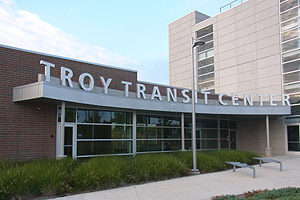
A front view of the Troy Transit Center, August 2015

The transit center is located in the southwest corner of Troy at 1201 Doyle Drive. It is about 1,200 feet (370 m) southwest of the former Birmingham Station and is situated behind the Midtown Square shopping center. The Oakland/Troy Airport is located just a few blocks away, on the east side of Coolidge Highway. The transit center has fairly easy access from both I-75 and Woodward Avenue (M-1).

Designed by local architectural firm Neumann/Smith, the one story, 2,000-square-foot (190 m^{2}) brick building includes a waiting room and restrooms, as well as large expanses of glass that allow natural light to flood the interior. There are 124 spaces for both long and short term free parking. A pedestrian bridge over the tracks allows access to the western platform and protects passengers from inclement weather. There is no ticketing, nor even a Quik-Trak kiosk, and baggage cannot be checked. Station hours are midnight to 2:00 am, 5:00 am to 6:30 am, 10:00 am to 11:30 am, and 5:00 pm to 6:30 pm daily. The station has an elevation of 750 feet (230 m).

There is a bus stand in front of the station and, according to the Troy Chamber of Commerce, there would be an estimated 18,200 SMART passengers stopping adjacent to the new transit center annually (about 50 per day). However, SMART buses were banned from the station in December 2016 as part of a long-running issues with the former owner of the land on which the station sits. A deal was struck in June 2017 allowing SMART to directly access the station again.

Of the 22 Michigan stations regularly served by Amtrak, Troy was the thirteenth-busiest in the Fiscal Year 2015, boarding or detraining an average of approximately 64 passengers daily. Although the Troy Transit Center replaced Birmingham station in early October 2014, the ridership for remained consistent following the change of stations. (Note: The indicated slight increase in the annual ridership for the Troy Transit Center combines the ridership data with the Birmingham station (which the Troy Transit Center replaced within the first two weeks of the Fiscal Year 2015) as if the two stations were one.)

== History ==
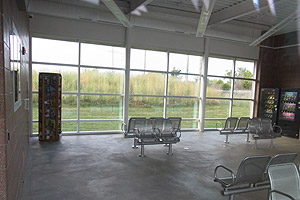
An interior view of the Troy Transit Center interior, August 2015

In 2000 a real estate developer, Grand/Sakwa Properties, LLC, gave the city of Troy title to 2.7 acres (1.1 ha) land on which to build a new station near the former Birmingham station. (Note: The land was part of an overall 77 acres [31 ha] development which included the Midtown Square shopping center.) However, title to the land was given with the express provision that funding for a transit center be secured within not more than ten years.

In 2011, the cities of Birmingham and Troy were awarded a federal grant to assist in replacing the station with a new, multimodal transit center across the tracks in Troy. However, the city of Birmingham backed out of the project in 2008 and the mayor of Troy, Janice Daniels, rejected the funding on ideological grounds, thus terminating the project. The $6.3 million (equivalent to $8.83 million in 2025) project was resurrected by a subsequent Troy city administration, with a groundbreaking on November 27, 2012 and final completion in October 2013. However, a legal dispute over title to the land under the transit center kept it from opening for another year. In late September 2014, a settlement by Troy to acquire the land was reached, allowing it to lease the site over the next twenty years to Amtrak. As part of the settlement the City of Troy was ordered to pay $1.05 million (equivalent to $1.47 million in 2025) to Grand/Sakwa Properties, LLC for the land in dispute. After 14 years of effort, the station finally opened on October 14, 2014, with the nearby Birmingham station having permanently closed the day before. Notwithstanding, the initial settlement to acquire the land, it took nearly another year before a final settlement was reached between the City of Troy and Grand/Sakwa Properties, LLC. The final settlement required an additional payment of $3.1 million (equivalent to $4.21 million in 2025) to Grand/Sakwa Properties, LLC.
