= Michigan Executive =

Former Amtrak commuter train

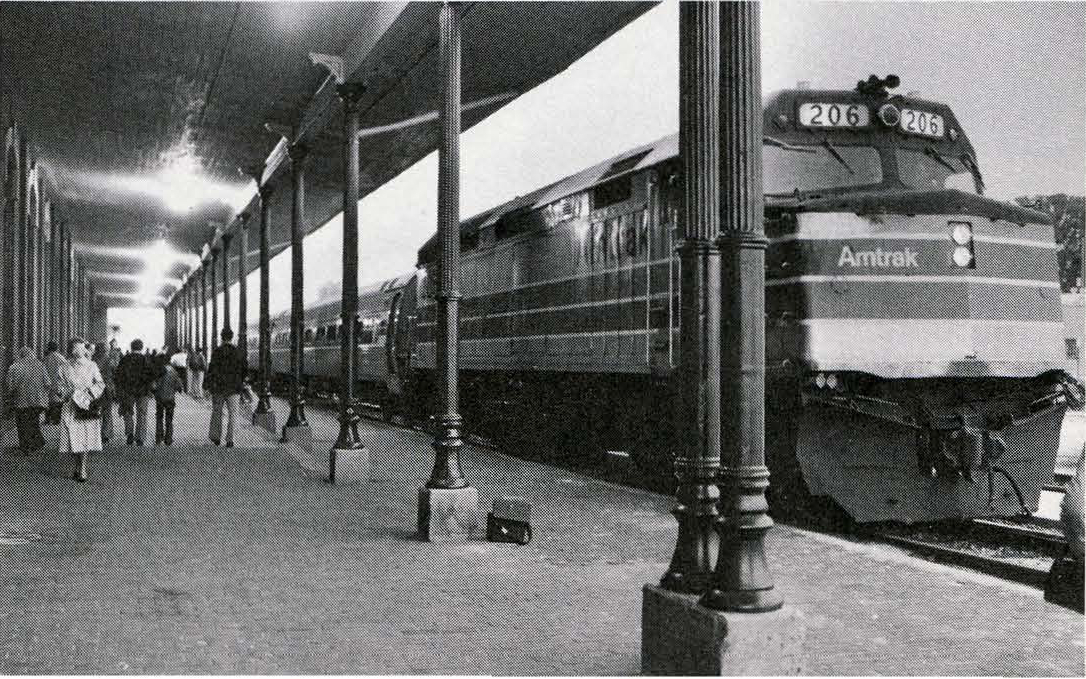
- The Michigan Executive at Jackson in October 1978

Overview
- Service type: Commuter rail
- Status: Discontinued
- Locale: Southeast Michigan
- First service: January 20, 1975
- Last service: January 13, 1984
- Former operator(s): Amtrak
- Ridership: 26,000 (1983)

Route
- Termini: Jackson, MI; Detroit, MI
- Stops: 5 (3 after 1982)
- Distance travelled: 74 miles (119 km)
- Average journey time: 1 hour 35 minutes
- Service frequency: 2 trains daily (weekday)
- Train number(s): 373, 374

Technical
- Track gauge: 4 ft 8 1/2 in (1,435 mm)
- Track owner(s): Conrail

The Michigan Executive was a commuter train operated by Amtrak between Detroit, Michigan, and Jackson, Michigan. Amtrak took over the service from Penn Central in 1975 and discontinued it in 1984.

== History ==
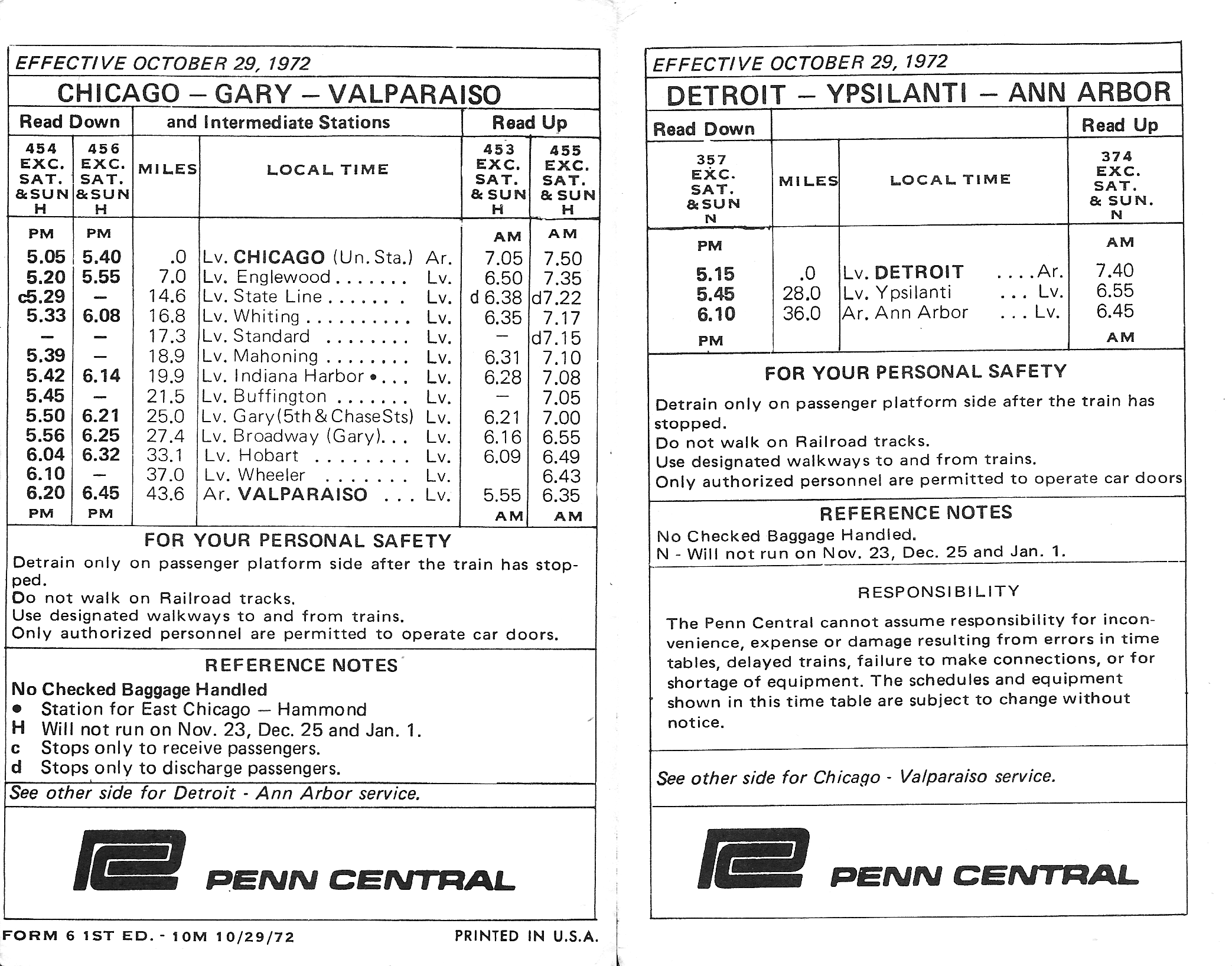
October 1972 Penn Central timetable showing the Detroit-Ann Arbor commuter service

As Amtrak's mandate did not cover commuter operations, Penn Central continued to operate a weekday commuter service between Detroit and Ann Arbor, Michigan after Amtrak had assumed control of its intercity operations. By the mid-1970s Penn Central asked to discontinue the service, citing dwindling ridership and the aging Rail Diesel Cars it used. Amtrak and the U.S. state of Michigan agreed to step in, and the Michigan Executive made its first run on January 20, 1975, running between Detroit and Jackson (to the west of Ann Arbor).

In the summer of 1975, the westbound Friday Michigan Executive operated all the way to Chicago, returning the following Sunday. Under Amtrak, ridership increased 50% and peaked at 96,573 in 1979. Chartered buses carried passengers from Michigan Central Station to downtown Detroit. Declining ridership due to the decline of downtown Detroit, a recession, and ticket price hikes led Amtrak to discontinue the westbound Michigan Executive on June 14, 1982, and eastbound service between Jackson and Detroit was truncated only running from Ann Arbor to Detroit. Returning commuters took the Chicago-Detroit Twilight Limited which was modified adding stops to accommodate former westbound Executive passengers. By 1983, annual ridership had fallen to 26,000.

Amtrak completely discontinued the remainder of the Michigan Executive on January 13, 1984, after Michigan withdrew its support citing low ridership. State transportation officials estimated that the discontinuance would save $200,000/year, and daily ridership had dwindled below 60.

== See also ==
- SEMTA Commuter Rail, former Detroit—Pontiac line
- Calumet, another discontinued Amtrak commuter rail line
