= Brush Street Station =

Train station in Detroit, Michigan

Coordinates: 42°19′41.1″N 83°02′20.4″W

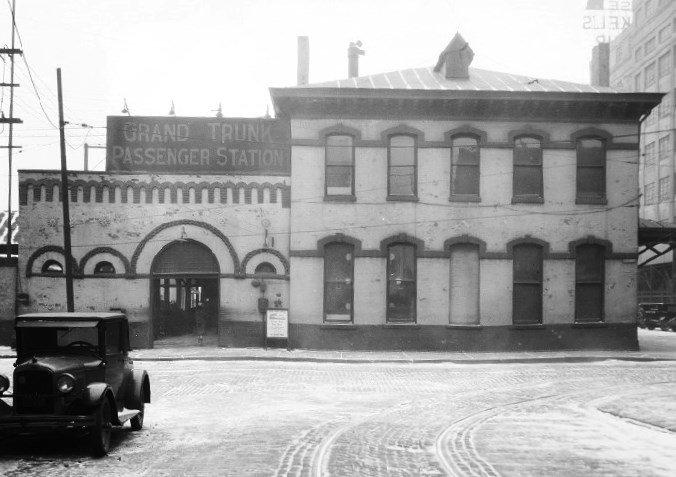
- The 1867 Brush Street Station in the mid 1930s

General information
- Location: Detroit, Michigan; United States

Other information
- Status: Demolished

History
- Opened: 1852
- Closed: 1983
- Rebuilt: 1867, 1974

Former services
Preceding station	SEMTA	Following station
Terminus	Silver Streak	Milwaukee Junction toward Pontiac
Preceding station	Grand Trunk Western Railroad	Following station
Terminus	Detroit and Milwaukee Division	Gratiot Avenue toward Grand Haven
Terminus	Suburban Service (Detroit)	Gratiot Avenue toward Pontiac
Terminus	Detroit – Port Huron	Gratiot Avenue toward Port Huron
Preceding station	Canadian National Railway	Following station
Terminus	London – Detroit	Windsor toward London
Preceding station	New York Central Railroad	Following station
Terminus	Detroit Branch before 1920s	Gratiot Avenue toward Toledo
Location

Brush Street Station was a passenger train station on the eastside of downtown Detroit, Michigan, located at the foot of Brush Street at its intersection with Atwater Street and bordered by the Detroit River to the south.

== History ==
The original station on this site was a passenger ferry terminal and train station opened in 1852 for the Detroit and Pontiac Railroad. The station was acquired by the Detroit and Milwaukee Railway, and also served the Michigan Southern & Northern Indiana Railroad. The station was destroyed by fire on the evening of April 26, 1866, when someone with a lantern went to inspect a leaking barrel of naphtha being loaded onto a freight car, setting off a chain reaction which also destroyed the ferry boat Windsor moored along the river, killing 17 passengers on the ferry and one person on a passenger train.

The second station on the site was a two-story red brick structure opened in 1867 and designed by the architect Gordon W Lloyd, was constructed as a union station for the Detroit and Milwaukee, and the Lake Shore and Michigan Southern Railway. The Detroit, Grand Haven and Milwaukee began serving the station in 1875.

The Lake Shore and Michigan Southern left for Michigan Central Station sometime during or after 1913.

The Grand Trunk Western Railroad Detroit-Port Huron trains begin using the Brush Street Station in 1928. Until this time, they terminated at the MC Third Street Station, or the Woodward Avenue Station. The final Grand Trunk Western trains to use the station were the GTW's Mohawk to Pontiac, Durand, South Bend and Chicago's Dearborn Station and unnamed train following the same route. In earlier years, the Grand Trunk's main service westward from Detroit involved trains due west to Pontiac, Durand, Owosso, Grand Rapids, and finally, Muskegon. Continuing at the station, past the May 1, 1971 shift of American passenger trains to Amtrak, were bus connections with the Canadian National Railway's station at Windsor for train service to Toronto.

=== New facility and final years ===
The second structure was razed in 1973 to make way for construction of the Renaissance Center.

The last station on this site, Franklin Street Station, was built in 1974 approximately two blocks to the east along St. Antoine Street between Franklin and Atwater streets and used by SEMTA commuter trains between Pontiac and downtown Detroit. This simple station consisted of only boarding platforms and a park-and-ride along Atwater Street. SEMTA's publications often referred to the station as Renaissance Center, although there was no direct connection between the two. The commuter train service was discontinued in 1983. The site is now the surface parking lot and the rail line to it repurposed as the Dequindre Cut greenway.

== See also ==
- Fort Street Union Depot
- Michigan Central Station
