= Detroit and Pontiac Railroad =

Historical American railroad

Map

The Detroit and Pontiac Railroad is a defunct railroad which operated in the state of Michigan during the mid-nineteenth century. It was the sixth railroad to receive a charter from Michigan, then a territory, and the second, after the Erie & Kalamazoo, to actually operate trains.

The first attempt to connect Detroit and Pontiac by railroad had come on July 31, 1830; when the Michigan Territorial Council granted a charter to the Pontiac and Detroit Railroad. This was the first such charter granted both in Michigan and in the Northwest Territory region. Nothing came of the Pontiac & Detroit, so in 1834 the state granted a new charter to the Detroit and Pontiac Railroad. After four years the D&P began operation over a modest 12-mile (19 km) line, spurred on by a $100,000 loan from the state. The railroad finally reached Pontiac in 1843, thirteen years after the state first granted a charter for that purpose.

On April 21, 1855, the D&P was consolidated with the Oakland and Ottawa Rail Road to form the Detroit and Milwaukee Railway and ceased to exist as an independent company. In 1878, the Detroit and Milwaukee Railway was reorganized as the Detroit, Grand Haven and Milwaukee Railway.
