= Pontiac Transportation Center =

Pontiac, MI
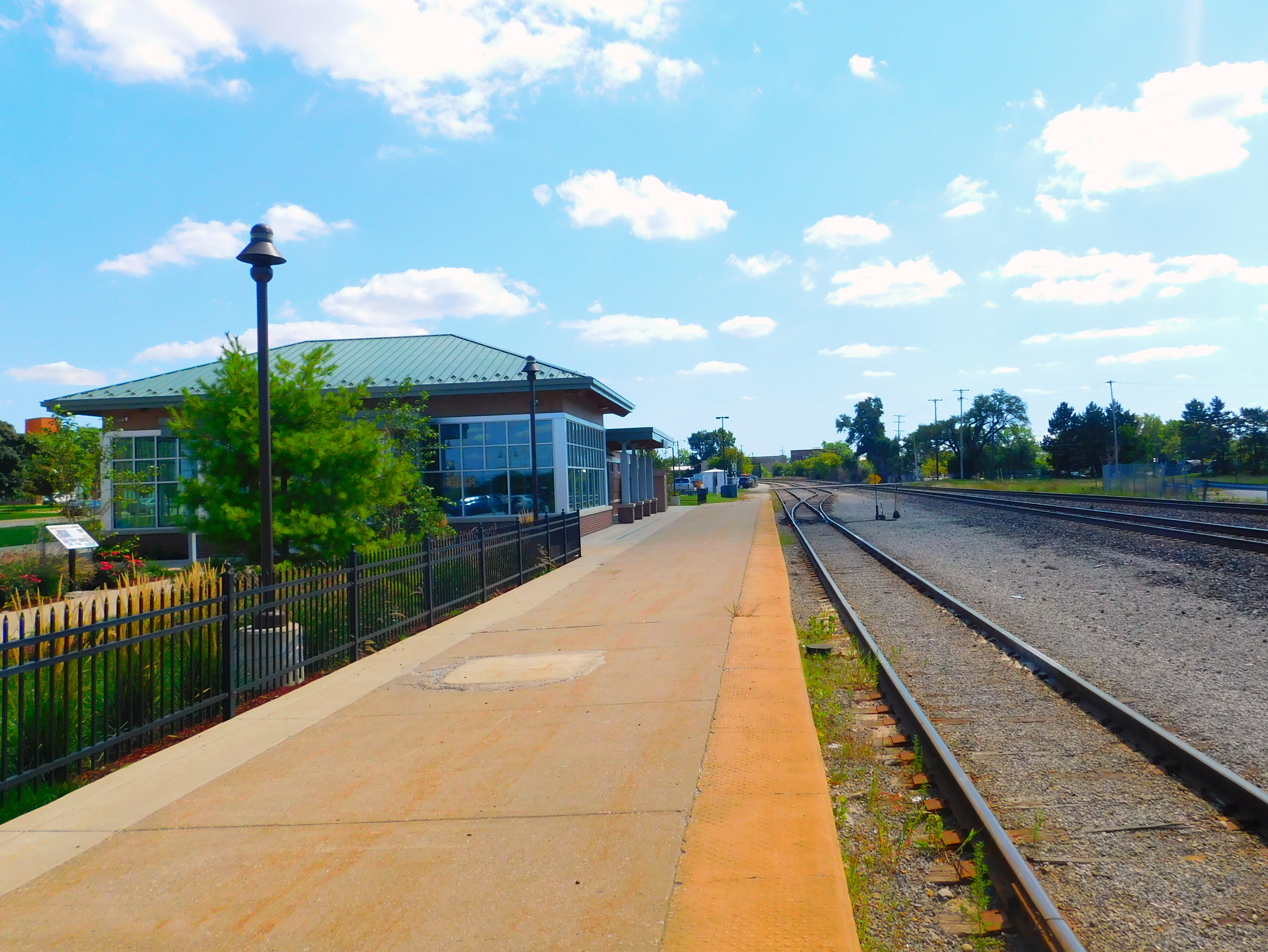
- Pontiac Transportation Center in September 2016

General information
- Location: 51000 Woodward Avenue; Pontiac, Michigan; United States
- Coordinates: 42°37′57″N 83°17′32″W
- Owner: Michigan Department of Transportation
- Line: CN Holly Subdivision
- Platforms: 1 side platform
- Tracks: 3
- Connections: SMART 450; Indian Trails

Construction
- Parking: 22 long term spaces
- Accessible: Yes

Other information
- Station code: Amtrak: PNT

History
- Opened: May 1983
- Rebuilt: August 8, 2011

Passengers
- FY 2025: 13,593 (Amtrak)

Services
Preceding station	Amtrak	Following station
Troy toward Chicago	Wolverine	Terminus
Former services
Preceding station	SEMTA	Following station
Bloomfield Hills toward Detroit	Silver Streak	Terminus
Preceding station	Grand Trunk Western Railroad	Following station
Birmingham toward Detroit	Detroit and Milwaukee Division	Drayton Plains toward Grand Haven
South Boulevard toward Detroit	Suburban Service (Detroit)	Terminus
Location

The Pontiac Transportation Center is an intermodal terminal station located in Pontiac, Michigan that is served by Amtrak's Michigan Services Wolverine. The transportation center is also served by Indian Trails intercity bus service and Suburban Mobility Authority for Regional Transportation (SMART) regional bus service.

== Description ==
The current transportation center is located on the southern edge of downtown at 51000 Woodward Avenue. It is about 1,400 square feet (130 m^{2}) and includes an indoor waiting room, restrooms, a payphone, and covered waiting areas for both trains and buses. However, it does not have any ticketing services, baggage assistance (bags cannot be checked for trains at the transportation center), or a Quik-Trak kiosk. There are 22 long-term parking spaces available, and the station hours are from 5:15 am to 6:15 am and from 10:00 am to 6:00 pm daily.

In addition to the three daily train departures, there are two northbound and two southbound Indian Trails intercity bus departures and local bus service SMART (stopping on Woodward Avenue). The station is owned by the Michigan Department of Transportation (MDOT), but the tracks are owned by the Canadian National Railway.

Of the 22 Michigan stations served by Amtrak, Pontiac was the 16th-busiest in fiscal year 2015, boarding or detraining an average of approximately 43 passengers daily.

== History ==
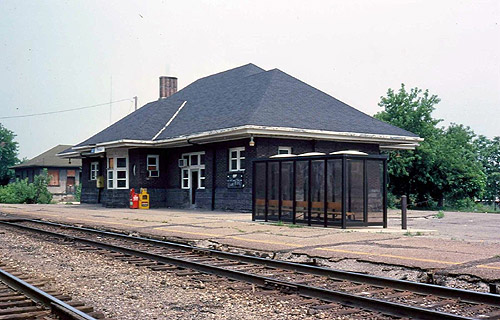
The ex-Grand Trunk station in 1978

The first railroad service between Pontiac and Detroit by The Detroit & Pontiac railroad started in 1843. Since August 1931 the Grand Trunk Western Railroad (GTWR, a subsidiary of the Canadian National Railway) provided commuter rail service from Pontiac to Detroit. Until 1960, the Grand Trunk Western operated through passenger trains from Detroit through Pontiac to Grand Rapids, on to Muskegon, where ferries could be boarded, for travelling across Lake Michigan, to Milwaukee.

By 1968 the railroad operated six daily commuter trains (three round-trips) between the two cities, with daily ridership averaging 2,812. When Amtrak took over passenger rail service in 1971, the GTWR service was not initially affected since the takeover did not include commuter rail. However, by that time the GTWR began posting losses on the service. On January 2, 1974 the Southeastern Michigan Transportation Authority (SEMTA) (Note: The Southeastern Michigan Transportation Authority (SEMTA), which eventually evolved into the Suburban Mobility Authority for Regional Transportation (SMART), was created in 1967 to assume the operations and ownership of the fractured regional transit systems in Macomb, Monroe, Oakland, St. Clair, Washtenaw, and Wayne counties, including the City of Detroit.) took over the GTWR trains and operated them as the Silver Streak. The aging depot turned over by the GTWR was located about 2,500 feet (760 m) to the northwest of the current Pontiac Transportation Center. The GTWR depot was situated east of the tracks on the northwest corner of West Huron Street and Woodward Avenue (known then as Wide Track Drive or Wide Track Circle).

=== Original building ===
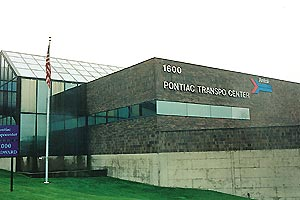
The former transportation center building in 2002

Construction of the original Pontiac Transportation Center began in the late 1970s, funded by a US$3 million (equivalent to $13,300,000 in 2025) loan from the MDOT, and the new facility was opened in May 1983, serving both buses and a commuter rail service to Detroit. The address provided by Amtrak for the facility was 1600 Wide Track Circle.

The facility was a two-story building, with the first story constructed of scored concrete and the second of brick veneer. Original plans called for a restaurant to be built on the second floor. A small glass-covered pavilion was also built into the structure.

Upon completion, the facility was initially served by SEMTA's Silver Streak, with service to Detroit (with the next eastbound stop being in Bloomfield Hills). Within six months of completion, however, the SEMTA commuter rail service was canceled, leaving the transportation center to serve only three buses a day. In addition, by 1985 structural deficiencies were already apparent, with interior surfaces showing water damage. In 1991, a pedestrian bridge between the transportation center and an office building across the street was opened, though it was closed within two years due to lack of use. Amtrak began serving the facility with its Wolverine service in 1994.

In 2002, it was announced that the building was suffering from substandard construction, and city officials said that it should be demolished. In 2005, the city and the MDOT signed an agreement whereby the building would be transferred to the MDOT, which would take responsibility for demolishing it and constructing a replacement, and the construction loan, never paid back by the city, would be written off. In summer 2008, demolition began on the station building, with the skywalk to follow; the demolition project, estimated to cost $400,000, was to be completed by the end of the year. A temporary station was erected on site that served Amtrak customers for the next three years until the replacement transportation center was completed.

=== Replacement ===
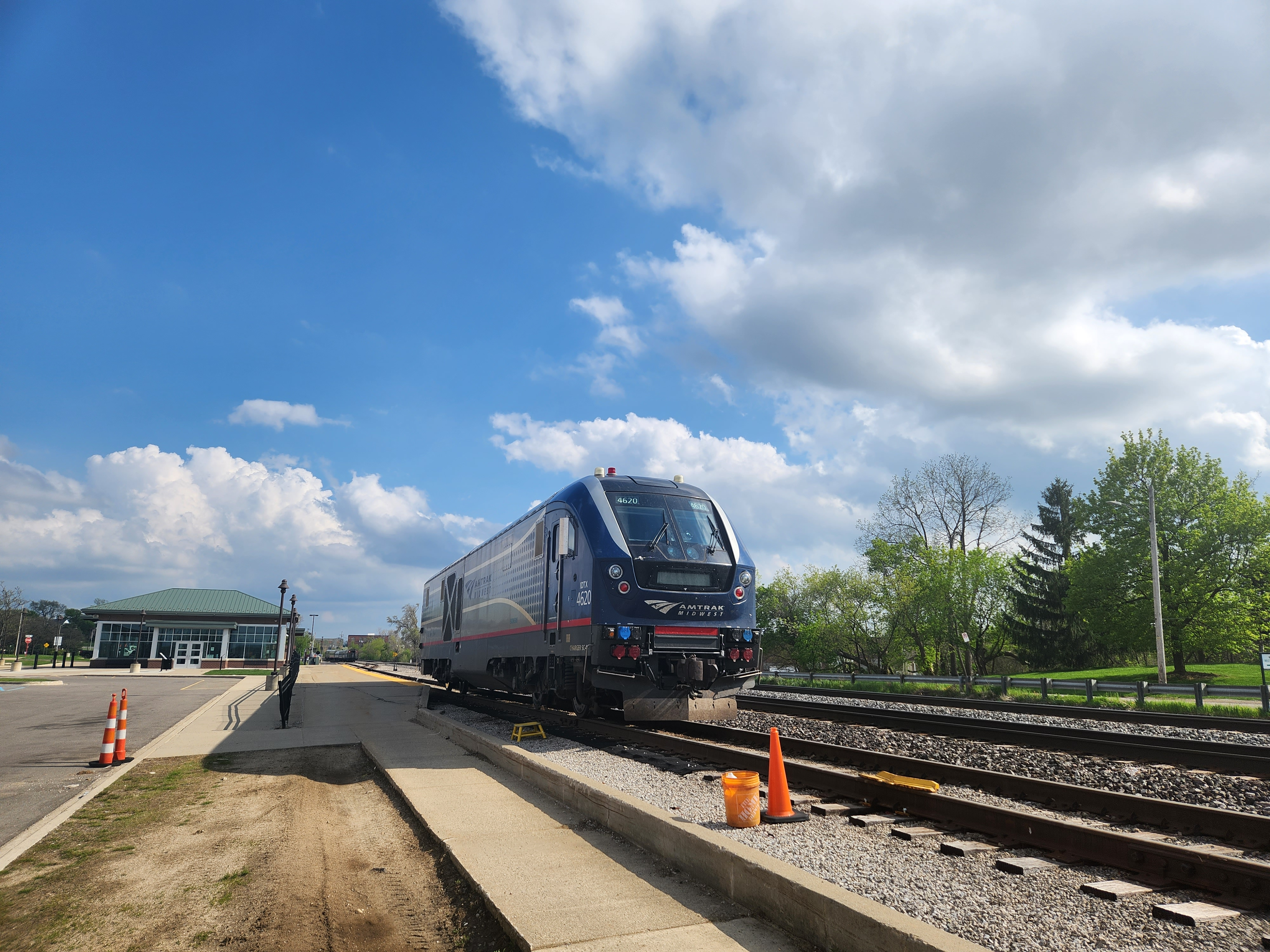
Locomotive and the new station

Construction of the new (current) transportation center began on July 16, 2010, with an opening date just over year later on August 8, 2011. The opening ceremony was attended by US Representative Gary Peters and State Representative Tim Melton. The new facility had a total cost of US$1.4 million and was funded via Michigan's Comprehensive Transportation Fund. Unlike the former facility, which had been anticipated to be grand multi-use building, the new center was fairly simple and intended to address just the existing and new future transportation needs.
