= Union Depot (Lansing, Michigan) =

American former train station

Lansing Union Depot
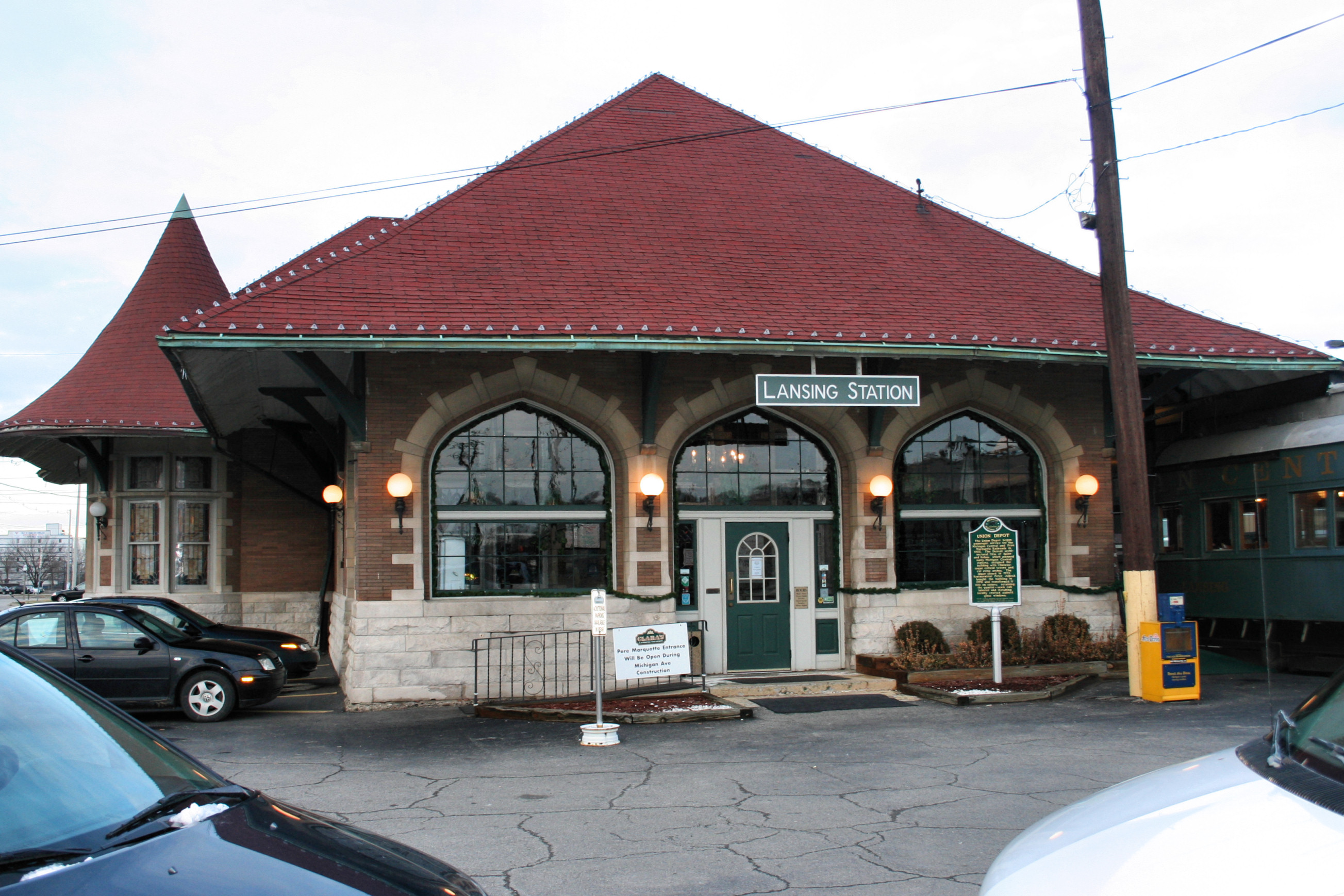
- The Union Depot in Lansing, Michigan

General information
- Location: 637 East Michigan Avenue, Lansing, Michigan 48912; United States
- Coordinates: 42°44′03.89″N 84°32′34.79″W
- Line: Plymouth Subdivision
- Platforms: 1 (historically)

History
- Opened: 1902
- Closed: 1972

Former services
Preceding station	New York Central Railroad	Following station
Holt toward Jackson	Bay City Branch	Bath toward Bay City
Preceding station	Chesapeake and Ohio Railway	Following station
North Lansing toward Grand Rapids	Grand Rapids – Detroit	Trowbridge toward Detroit
- Union Depot
- U.S. National Register of Historic Places
- Interactive map
- Built: 1902
- Architect: Spier and Rohns
- Architectural style: Tudor Revival
- NRHP reference No.: 95000869
- Added to NRHP: July 21, 1995
Location
- Location within Michigan

The Union Depot is a former train station, located at 637 E. Michigan Avenue in Lansing, Michigan. It was listed on the National Register of Historic Places in 1995.

== History ==
The first railroad through Lansing was the Amboy, Lansing and Traverse Bay Railroad, which arrived in 1863. The Jackson & Lansing Railroad followed in 1864, and in 1871 the Michigan Central Railroad began leasing these lines. Michigan Central constructed a wooden passenger depot at this spot in 1873. The depot also served the Detroit, Lansing and Lake Michigan Rail Road, which had constructed tracks through Lansing in 1868. In 1900, this line was consolidated into the Pere Marquette Railroad.

However, also by 1900, the wooden depot was proving inadequate to service both the Michigan Central and Pere Marquette Railways, and the two companies jointly decided to replace the station in 1901. The Detroit architectural firm of Spier and Rohns, which planned many Michigan Central stations, designed the station. Construction began in late 1901, and was finished in 1902. The combined depot served both lines for decades, but with the increase in automobile traffic, ridership declined. The New York Central Railroad, the successor to Michigan Central, ceased its remaining passenger service (Jackson-Lansing-Saginaw-Bay City) in 1959. The Chesapeake and Ohio Railway, the successor to the Pere Marquette, continued passenger service to Lansing (on the Grand Rapids-Detroit circuit) only due to the threat of legal action, and when Amtrak took over passenger trains, they ended service to Lansing in 1971.

The depot remained vacant for several years. In 1978, restaurateur Peter Jubeck bought the building and transformed it into Clara's Lansing Station. Retaining the quarter-sawn oak interior and installing locally crafted stained glass windows, the restaurant has a unique and historical atmosphere. In 1994, Jubeck purchased an old Pullman sleeper rail car, renovating it, and attaching to the building, opening it in 1999 to add more seating space. Clara's Lansing Station was the sister restaurant of Clara's on the River located in the Michigan Central Depot in Battle Creek.

The restaurant closed on June 26, 2016 after 38 years of operation. Later that year the building was purchased by Lansing-based Gillespie Group with plans to preserve the station for future reuse. It has since been converted to restaurant space, which has included a Starbucks since 2022.

== Description ==
The Lansing Union Depot is a single-story, hip-roof Tudor Revival building with walls finished in light brown Roman pressed brick ad limestone. It sits on a concrete foundation, with limestone above, up to the level of the window sills. The depot measures 149 feet in length and 35 feet in width. The roof, originally covered with Ludowici tiles but now covered with asphalt shingles, has wide eaves supported with brackets. Semi-round towers on one side are topped with conical roofs.
