= Peter Jubeck =

Businessman

- Born: Peter Gerald Jubeck; February 9, 1936; Isabella, Fayette County, Pennsylvania, US
- Died: May 12, 2003 (aged 67); Wacousta, Michigan, US
- Occupation: Entrepreneur
- Political party: Republican
- Spouse: Linda

Peter Gerald "Pete" Jubeck (February 9, 1936–May 12, 2003) was an American businessman who founded, with partner Robert Swartz, the restaurants Sir Pizza of Michigan and Clara's Lansing Station, both in Lansing, Michigan, and with partner Ross Simpson, Clara's on the River in Battle Creek, Michigan.

== Biography ==
=== Early life ===
Jubeck was born in Isabella, Fayette County, Pennsylvania, in 1936. His father, Pete Jubeck, was a coal mine mechanic, whose parents Michal Džubák and Mária Varhoľáková were Slovak immigrants from Jakoris (today Jakovany) and Olejnok (today Olejníkov) respectively. The couple married in Litinye (today Ľutina) in 1895. Michal arrived at Ellis Island on 13 January 1905. Mária arrived later with 2 of their children on 3 January 1906.

Jubeck served with the United States Air Force, North Sea, West Germany with the Air Force Security Service as a Radio Intercept Operator in the 1950s. Jubeck went to Ball State University in Muncie, Indiana, on a football scholarship attaining Bachelor of Arts; Physical Education and Social Science.

Clara's Lansing Station
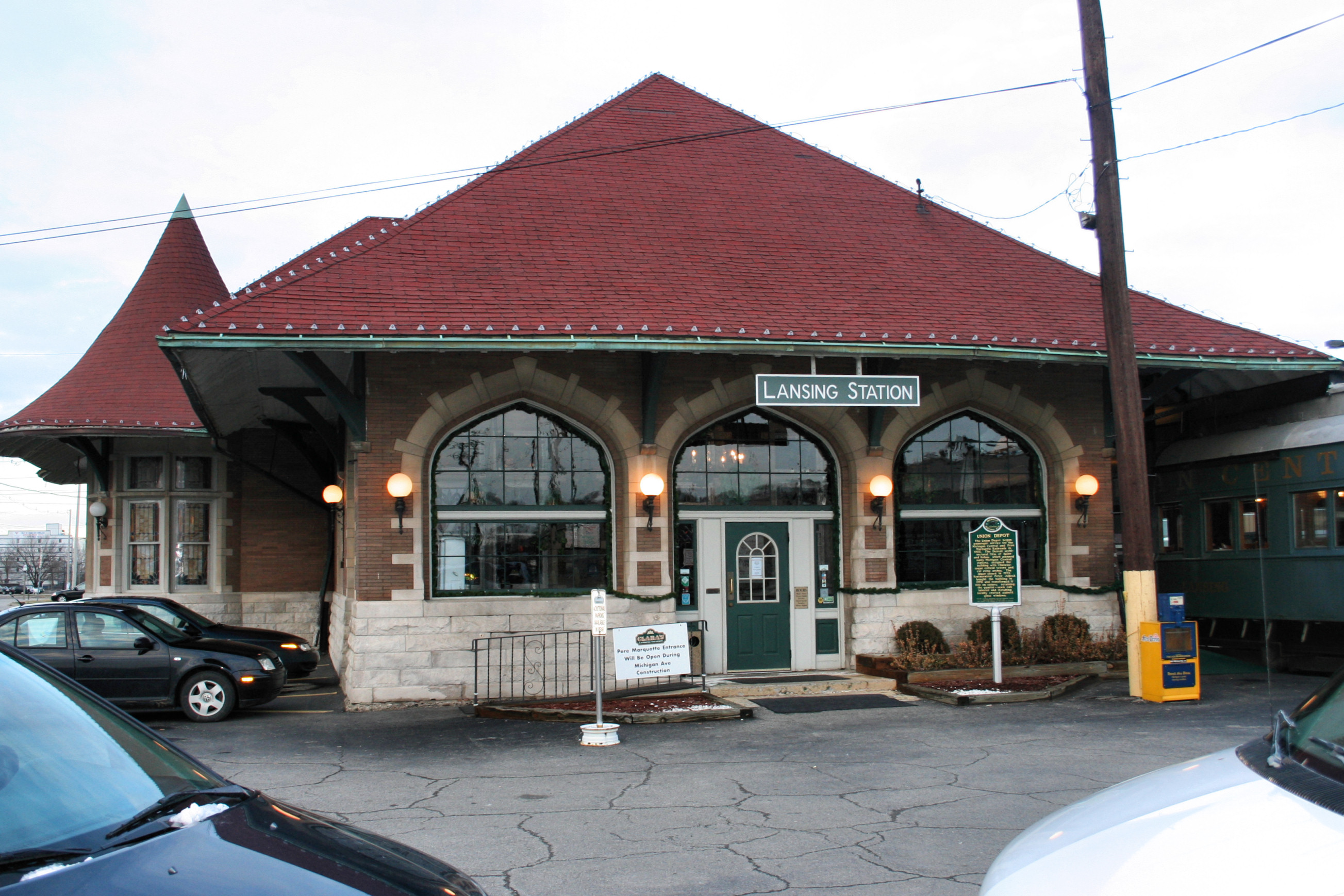
- Clara's Lansing Station

Restaurant information
- Established: 1979
- Owners: Linda, Scott, & Cindy Jubeck
- Location: 637 East Michigan Avenue, Lansing, Michigan, 48912, United States
- Seating capacity: 260
- Website: Clara's Lansing Station Official Web Site

Clara's on the River
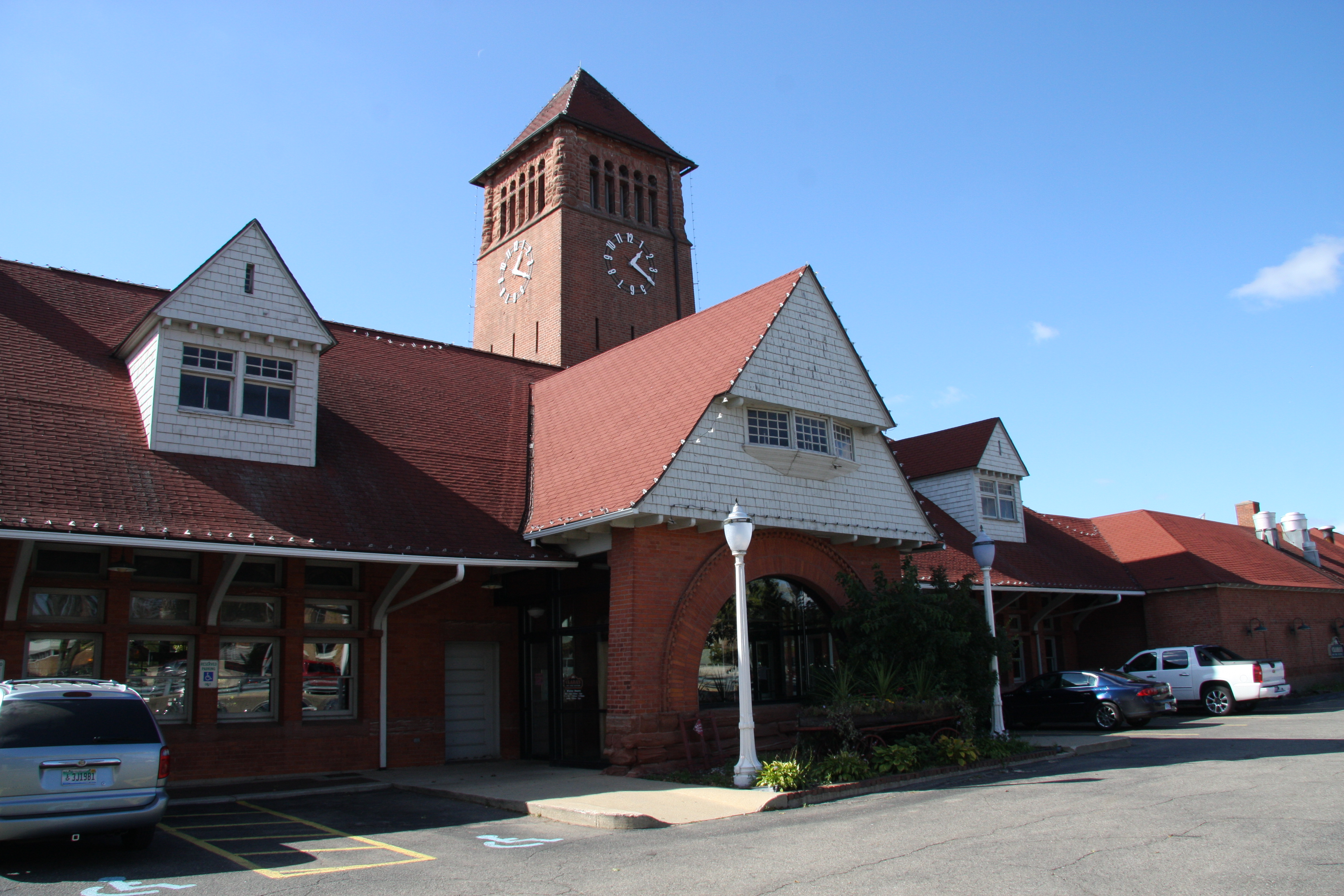
- Clara's on the River

Restaurant information
- Established: 1992
- Owner: Ross Simpson
- Location: 44 McCamly Street N, Battle Creek, Michigan, 49017, United States
- Seating capacity: 375
- Website: Clara's on the River Official Web Site

=== Career highlights ===
==== Pizza King and Sir Pizza ====
Beginning in 1962, and while attending Ball State, Jubeck worked at Pizza King, a local pizza eatery owned by the Swartz family. Robert W. (Bob) Swartz, worked in his mom and dad's pizza place, located in Muncie, Indiana. With an engineering degree and a passion for details, Bob was able to help his mom and dad develop a cup system that was easy to follow and produced quality results on a consistent basis. The location was expanded five times. They received numerous requests from people to buy their recipes, systems, and techniques. Instead of selling them, the Swartzes decided to franchise their operation under the name of Sir Pizza, which was incorporated in 1965.

Together with Bob Swartz, Jubeck developed the State Franchise Division of the company. Sir Pizza branched out through franchise locations in several states, including Kentucky, Tennessee, Florida, Ohio, North Carolina, and Pennsylvania, as well as locations abroad through Sir Pizza International. (Sir Pizza International now has over 200 franchises in operation in the United States, and abroad. In 1992 Sir Pizza broke into the top twenty list of "Pizza Today's" best 200 franchises).

In 2015, Sir Pizza was named the official training food of the Ironman Competition.

Jubeck then partnered with Swartz as co-owner Sir Pizza of Michigan in 1966, opening their first Sir Pizza restaurant on Kalamazoo Street in Lansing, Michigan. Sir Pizza of Michigan is a licensee of Pizza King of Muncie, Indiana. Each of Jubeck's three brothers (Charles, Barry, and Tom) and his sister (Marcie) became associated with Sir Pizza thereafter. By 1975, Sir Pizza of Michigan had grown to eight company owned locations, eight franchise locations, and a central commissary, all in the Lansing area.

==== Clara's restaurants ====
In 1978, Jubeck chose the old Union Depot (Lansing, Michigan) built in 1903 as the site of his new venture Clara's Lansing Station, which opened in the summer of 1979 bringing life back into the once proud structure. The name "Clara's" was chosen because it was a popular name at the turn of the 20th century, and because it was the name of Swartz's mother. This new restaurant location, designed and developed by Peter himself, was much larger than his pizza restaurants, touting a seating capacity of over 200 guests. Clara’s menu was larger too, offering steaks, seafood, hamburgers and salads in addition to Sir Pizza’s fare. The décor displayed turn of the century memorabilia from around the state. Clara’s quickly became a local favorite.

In 1980, Jubeck hired Ross Simpson as General Manager to help further develop the concept and menu, and to handle operations of the restaurant. Simpson added more entrées to the menu, including "Chicken Hawaiian", Clara's biggest seller. Simpson left Clara's in 1982 to join the T.G.I. Friday's restaurant chain, but returned to Clara's as Director of Operations in 1989. About this time, Jubeck ended his partnership with Swartz and separated Clara’s operations from those of Sir Pizza in order to focus his efforts towards refining and expanding Clara’s concept. In 1991, Sir Pizza of Michigan was sold to Peter's brother Charles Jubeck, who was previously associated with Sir Pizza in Kentucky. Charles has since sold Sir Pizza of Michigan to another partnership.

Shortly after his return, Simpson expanded Clara's entree menu to sixteen pages, added an award winning Sunday Brunch, and outdoor patio dining. This period resulted in substantial sales growth, which allowed Jubeck to undertake an expansion of the Lansing restaurant. The subsequent addition of a restored 1910 Pullman Dining car to allow seating for 60 additional guests was completed in early 1999.

Early in 1991, Jubeck and Simpson purchased and restored the Michigan Central Railroad Depot (Battle Creek, Michigan) built in 1888 and, on June 8, 1992, opened Clara's on the River restaurant with a seating capacity of 300 guests. It offered the same food and beverage items as Clara's in Lansing, and emphasized the rich history of Battle Creek in the depot's decor. Clara's on the River was an immediate success, with over 330,000 visitors its first year. In late 1998, Clara's completed the development of a twelve hundred square foot banquet room in the "Railway Express Agency" (REA) building located on Clara's on the River's property.

=== Death and personal life ===
Jubeck was a strong family man, member of the Michigan Restaurant Association, and of the Asbury United Methodist Church in Lansing. He was an avid racketball player and golfer. Peter Jubeck died of esophageal cancer at his home in Wacousta, Michigan, on May 12, 2003, at the age of 67. Family ownership of Clara's Lansing Station continued through his wife of 40 years, Linda, and through their two children, Scott and Cindy, who were raised while working in the family business. Linda, Scott, and Cindy operated the Lansing, Michigan, location until they sold the depot to the Gillespie Group in 2016. Simpson became the sole owner of Clara's on the River upon Peter Jubeck's death, and continues to operate the Battle Creek, Michigan, location.

== See also ==
- Union Depot (Lansing, Michigan)
- Michigan Central Railroad Depot (Battle Creek, Michigan)
