= John N. Bagley House =

Historic house in Michigan, United States

- U.S. National Register of Historic Places
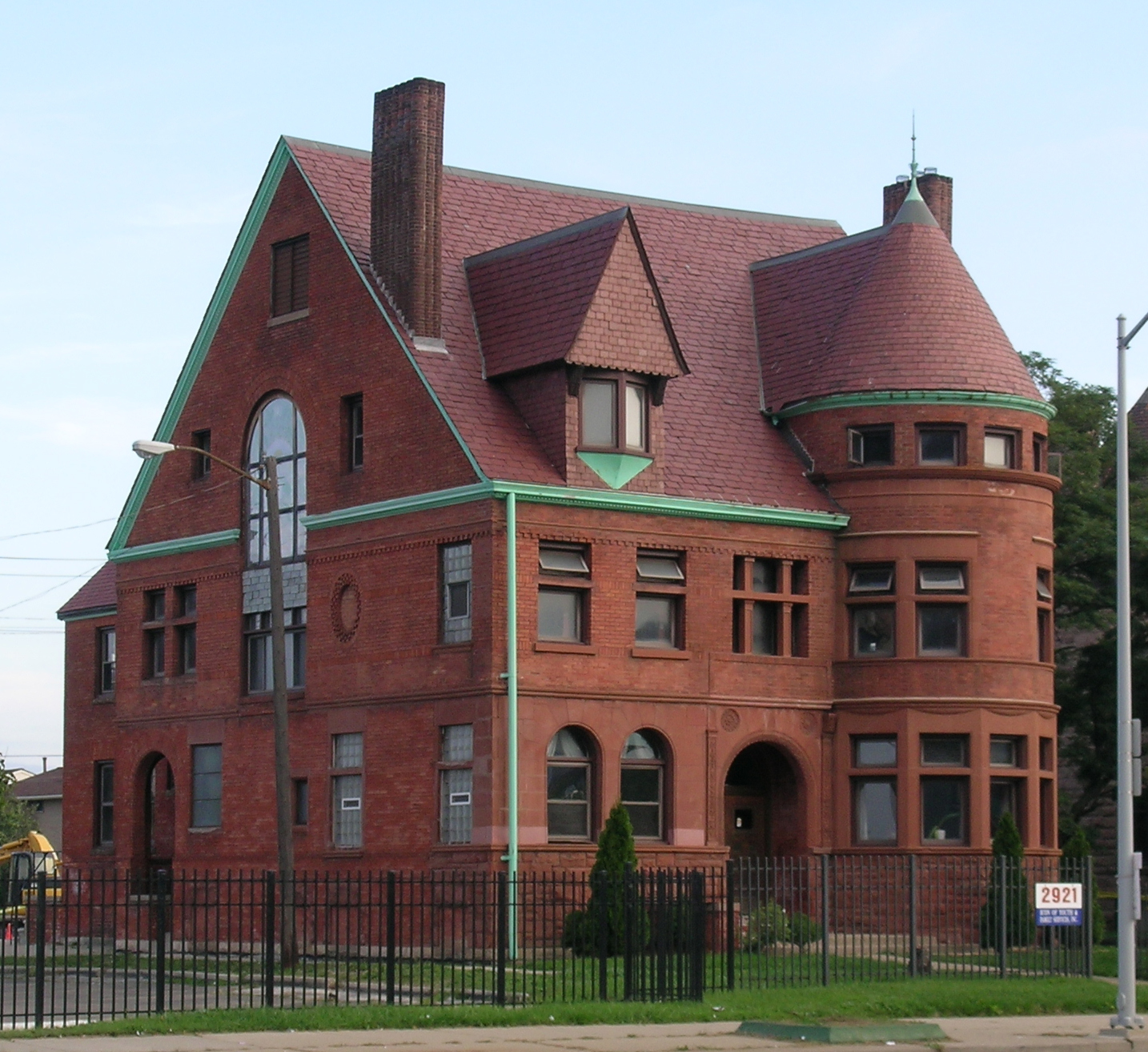
- Interactive map
- Location: 2921 East Jefferson Avenue; Detroit, Michigan
- Coordinates: 42°20′27″N 83°1′3″W
- Built: 1889
- Architect: Rogers and MacFarlane
- Architectural style: French Renaissance Revival
- MPS: East Jefferson Avenue Residential TR
- NRHP reference No.: 85002934
- Added to NRHP: October 09, 1985

The John N. Bagley House, also known as Bagley Mansion, was built as a private residence in 1889. The mansion is located at 2921 East Jefferson Avenue in Detroit, Michigan. It was listed on the National Register of Historic Places in 1985. As of 2022, the house is used as a commercial office building, maintaining its historic features and character.

== Architecture ==
The Bagley House is a two-and-one-half-story French Renaissance Revival mansion built of red sandstone brick. Evidence has revealed that the house was designed in the French Renaissance Revival style by the Detroit firm Rogers and MacFarlane, while it was previously believed to have been designed by Shepley, Rutan, and Coolidge of the Richardson firm since the family had hired Richardson to design the Bagley Memorial Fountain. The French Renaissance Revival style house has some similar application of materials of H. H. Richardsonian Romanesque. It has a massive gable roof and a tower with conical roof. The entrance is set into a round arch and the roof dormer features a bay window. The façade contains multiple hand-carved fireplaces, original stained glass window treatments including sculptural elements by famous turn-of-the-century American sculptor Julius Melchers.

== Significance ==
The house, built in 1889 for John N. Bagley, son of former Michigan governor John J. Bagley, is among the oldest surviving nineteenth-century French Renaissance Revival mansions in Detroit. The Bagley family commissioned the Bagley Memorial Fountain, designed in Romanesque Revival architecture, the only remaining work by Henry Hobson Richardson in the Detroit area. This house is still one of the finest of Detroit's Richardsonian Romanesque houses.

== Owners ==
The house became a commercial building when many other mansions on Detroit's main artery, E Jefferson Ave, began to convert away from private residences. The building has been home to the University of Detroit Mercy School of Dentistry Administrative Building and Real Estate One. The building became somewhat derelict for several decades and was purchased by Vallery Hyduk and Keasha Rigsby, owners of Beautiful Bridal, who opened a high-end bridal shop and ran an event venue in the location from 2016 - 2022. Post Covid, the owners closed the event venue and pivoted the building to the leasing of office space.
