= Samuel L. Smith House =

Historic house in Michigan, United States

- U.S. National Register of Historic Places
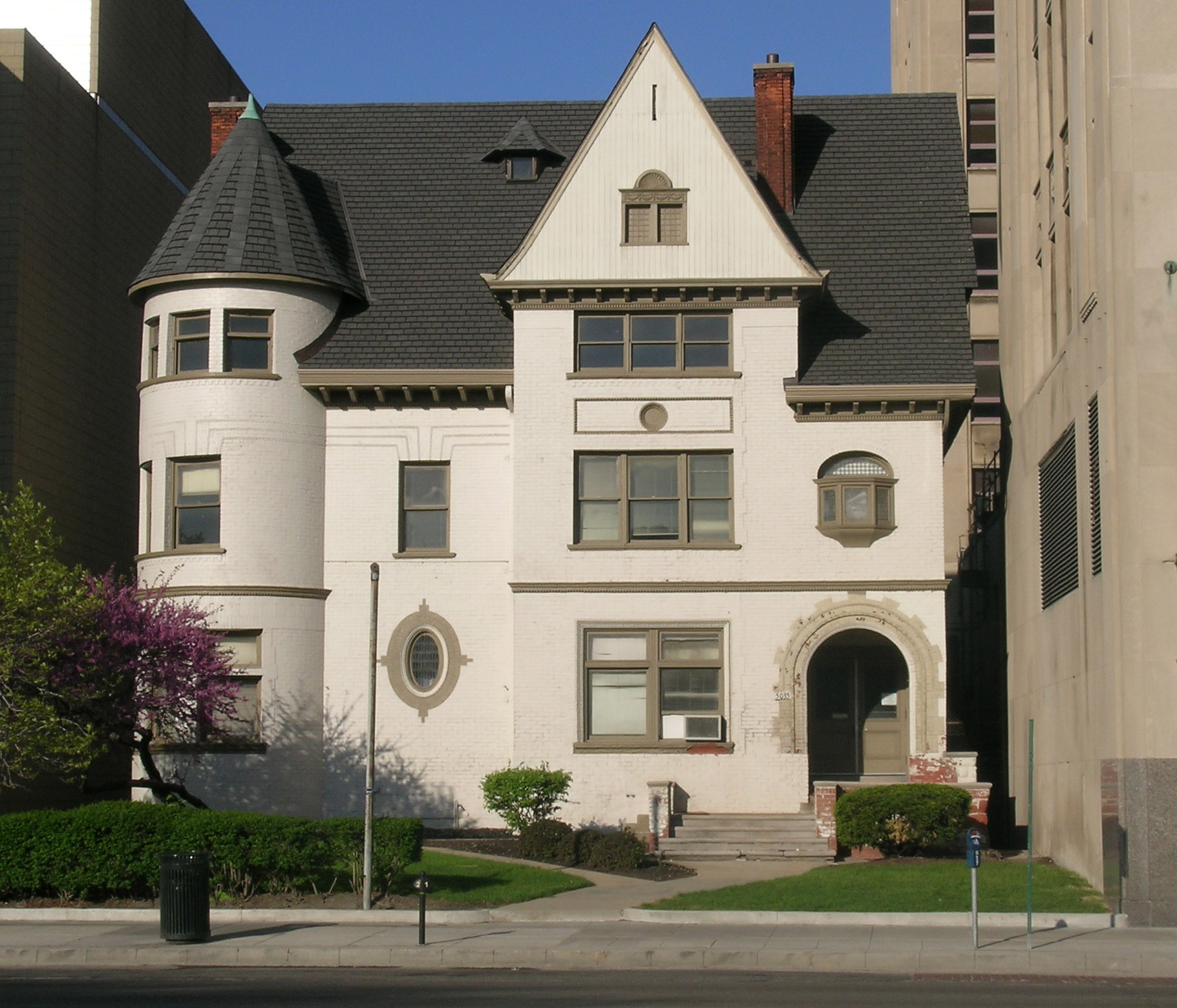
- Interactive map
- Location: 5035 Woodward Avenue; Detroit, Michigan
- Coordinates: 42°21′26.22″N 83°3′55.46″W
- Built: 1889
- Architect: James S. Rogers and Walter MacFarlane
- Architectural style: Queen Anne
- MPS: University–Cultural Center Phase I MRA
- NRHP reference No.: 86001038
- Added to NRHP: April 29, 1986

The Samuel L. Smith House is located at 5035 Woodward Avenue in Midtown Detroit, Michigan. It was also known as the Schools Annex. It was listed on the National Register of Historic Places in 1986.

== History ==
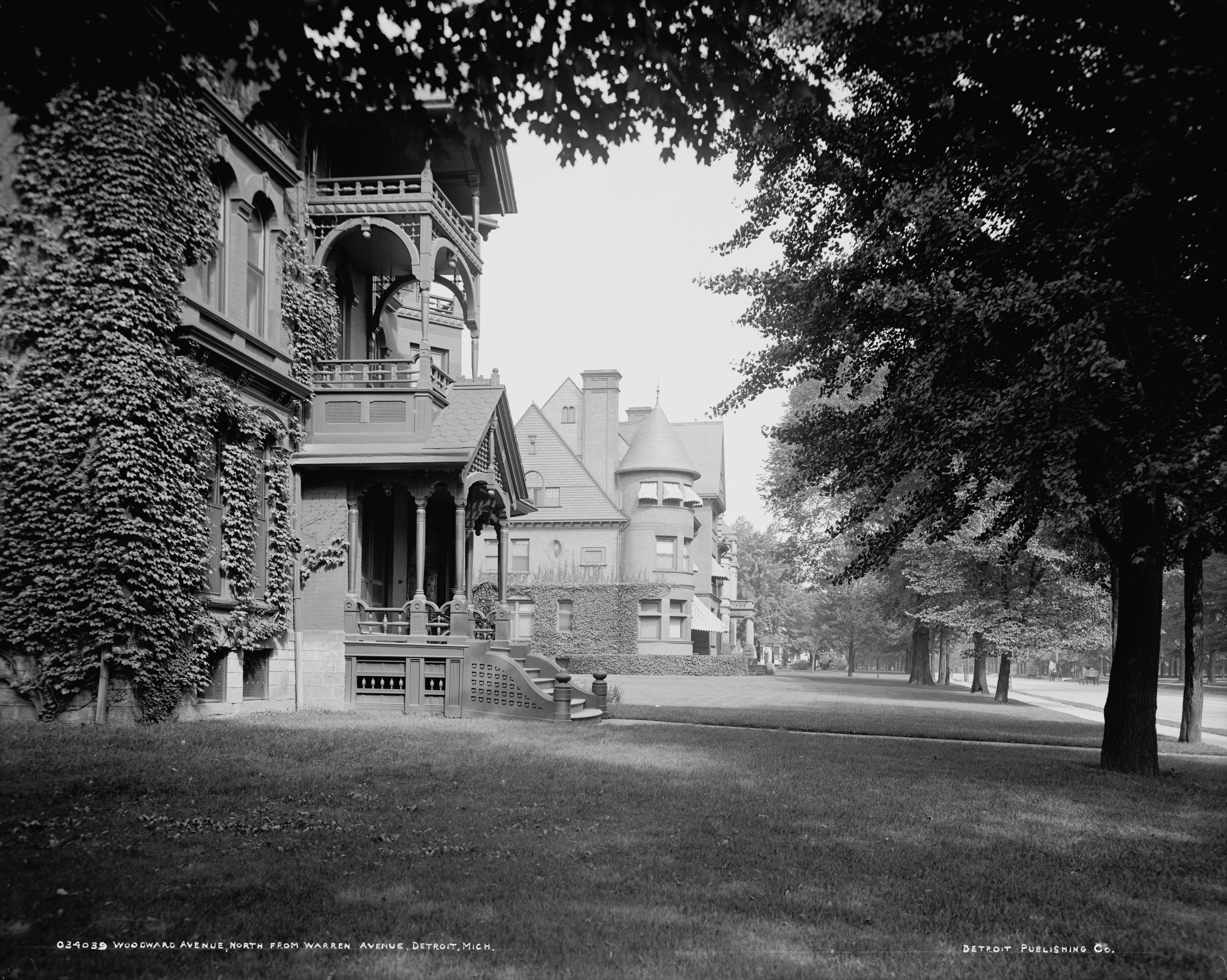
The Samuel Smith House (midground) c. 1900, looking north from the corner of Woodward and Warren

This house was built in 1889 for $17,000, for William C. Williams by the architectural firm of Rogers and MacFarlane in what was then a quiet neighborhood on the outskirts of Detroit. Williams was a Detroit businessman who was instrumental in organizing the Detroit College of Medicine, later incorporated into Wayne State University.

The next year, Williams sold the home to its most famous resident, Samuel L. Smith. Smith was one of the most prominent citizens of Detroit at the time, having made his fortune in lumber, shipping, mining and railroad ventures. In particular, Smith's investments in the Calumet and Hecla Mining Company made him tremendously wealthy. He later financed many automobile ventures, most notably the Olds Motor Works in the late 1890s.

Smith lived in the home for 27 years, after which it was purchased by the Detroit Music Conservatory. A few years later, the Conservatory built a two-story rear addition that connected the main house to the original carriage house. In 1960, Wayne State University purchased the building to serve as the home for WDET and WSU's Office of the Center of Instructional Technology. In 1979, the Detroit Public Schools bought the building, using it until 2003 when WSU repurchased it.

== Description ==
The Samuel L. Smith House is a three-story, cross-gabled Queen Anne building with Romanesque and Colonial Revival elements. The house is square in plan, and constructed of red brick that has since been painted a light grey. A round corner tower is on one side of the facade, balanced by a Romanesque front entry arch. A bay window is located above the main entrance. The gable ends are decorated with windows, fanlights, and other designs. The center front gable end contains swag motifs and a Colonial style window, the south gable contains a Palladian window, and the north gable a large Colonial window with a fanlight.

The interior of the house contains oak wainscoting and moldings, and many fireplaces throughout the building. A leaded glass window in the northers wall contains the coat of arms and the initials of William C. Williams. A two-story rear addition, dating from approximately 1920, connects the main house to the original two-story, red brick, cross-gabled carriage house.
