= L. B. King and Company Building =

- L. B. King and Co. Building
- U.S. National Register of Historic Places
- Michigan State Historic Site
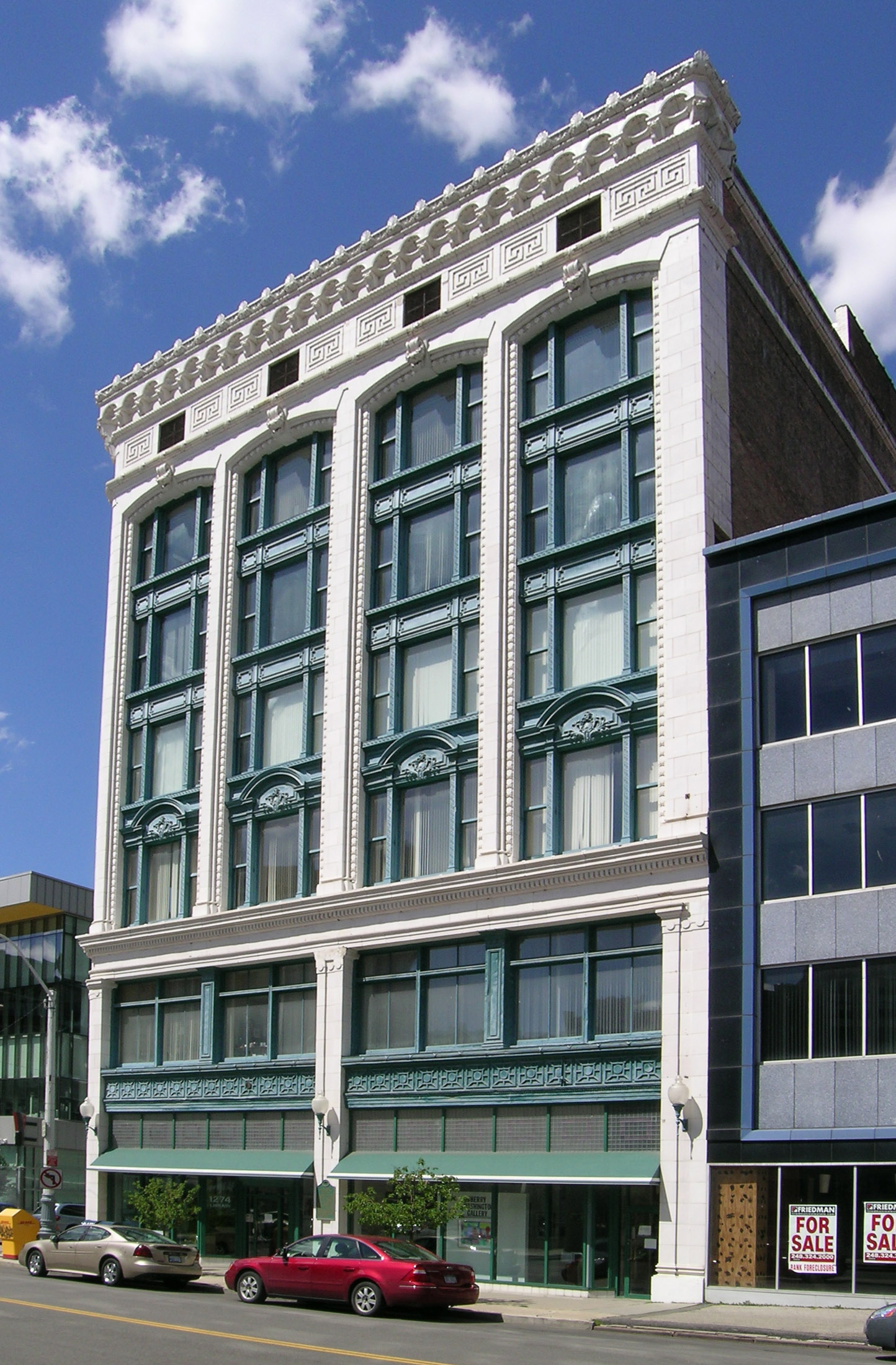
- Interactive map
- Location: 1274 Library Street; Detroit, Michigan
- Coordinates: 42°20′5″N 83°2′51″W
- Built: 1911
- Architect: Rogers and MacFarlane; Walter MacFarlane
- Architectural style: Chicago School, Renaissance Revival
- NRHP reference No.: 87000927

Significant dates
- Added to NRHP: June 12, 1987
- Designated MSHS: January 22, 1987

The L. B. King and Company Building is a commercial building located at 1274 Library Street in Detroit, Michigan. It is also known as the Annis Furs Building. The building was listed on the National Register of Historic Places and designated a Michigan State Historic Site in 1987.

== History ==
L. B. King was born in Detroit in 1851, was educated in the city, and earned a BS degree from the University of Michigan in 1874. After graduation, King joined his father's crockery and glassware firm, which had been founded in 1849. He rose through the ranks to become president of the company in 1907, by which time the company was specializing as a china wholesaler.

In 1910, King engaged architects Rogers and MacFarlane to design this building as their offices; the structure was completed in 1911. The firm maintained its headquarters in the building from 1911 to 1932. In 1932, Annis Furs, a wholesale and retail furrier established by Newton Annis in 1887, moved into the building. They used the building until 1983, nearly the last example of the fur industry that helped found Detroit nearly 300 years earlier. In 1988 the Law Firm of Patterson, Phifer, and Phillips hired Frank Z. Martin to refurbish the building.

Both L. B. King and Company and Annis Furs were prominent commercial firms in the history of Detroit. The building was renovated placed on the National Register of Historic Places and the state of Michigan historic register in 1987, and later renovated and reopened in 1988.

== Description ==
The L. B. King and Company Building is a six-story commercial building with a steel frame with white terra cotta cladding on the facade. The facade of the lower two stories are virtually all glass; the upper four stories are divided into four vertical sections, each with Chicago-style windows. Atop the building is an elaborate Italian Renaissance cornice which was added in 1926. The building exemplifies the Commercial style of architecture that was extensively used in the early twentieth century.
