= Crescent Brass and Pin Company Building =

- U.S. National Register of Historic Places
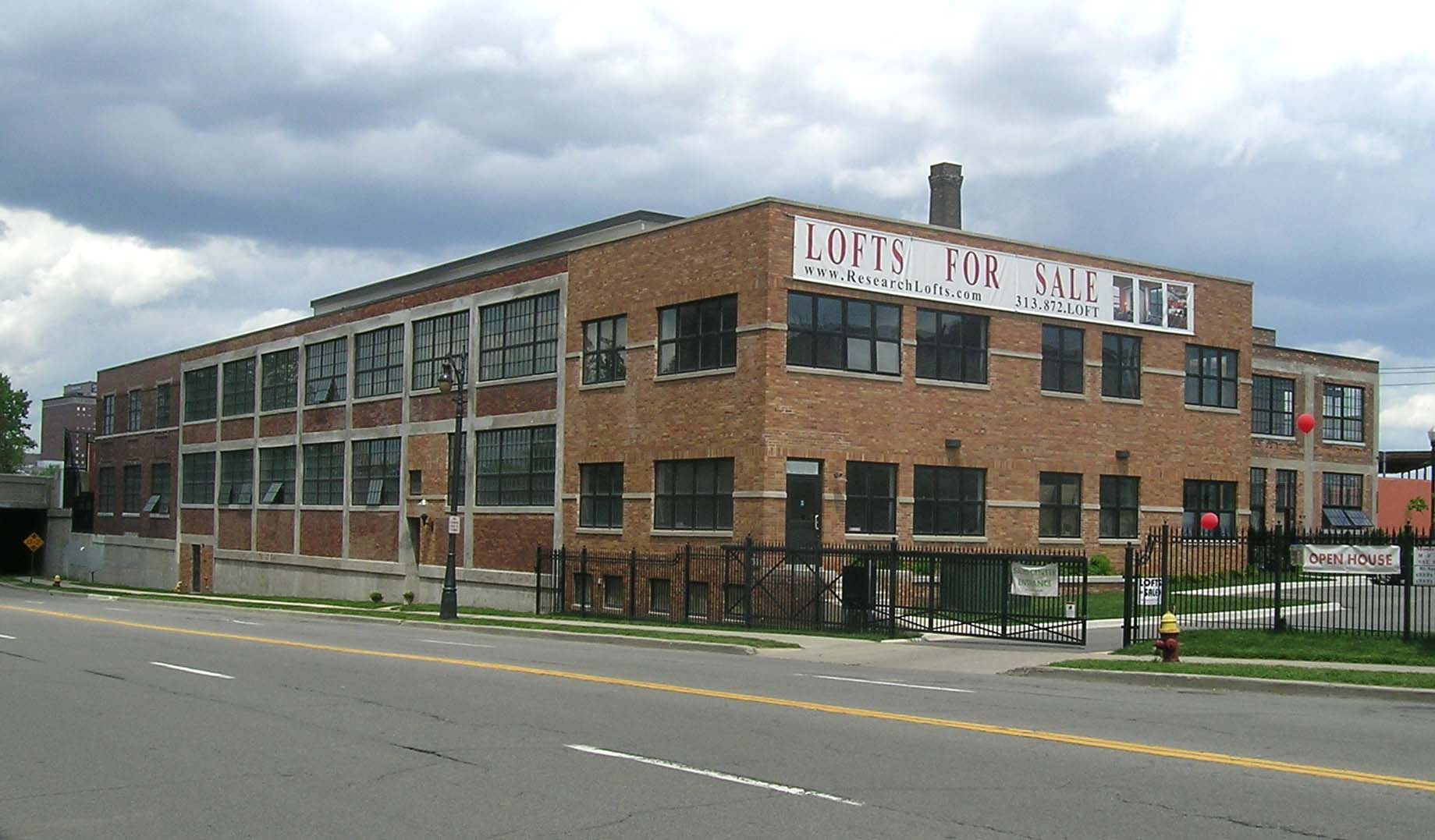
- Interactive map
- Location: 5766 Trumbull St., Detroit, Michigan
- Coordinates: 42°21′32″N 83°4′56″W
- Built: 1905
- Architect: Rogers and MacFarlane
- NRHP reference No.: 03000067
- Added to NRHP: March 3, 2003

The Crescent Brass and Pin Company Building is located at 5766 Trumbull Street in Detroit, Michigan. It was listed on the National Register of Historic Places in 2003. It is currently known as the Research Lofts on Trumbull.

== History ==
In 1886, Alvin W. Needham designed a machine to manufacture cigar box nails. He enlisted the support and investment of John and William Gray, brothers who operated a carriage building business.

The three men founded the Empire Wire Nail Company to manufacture nails, operating out of John Gray's barn on Trumbull. Meanwhile, Needham invented another machine to make radiator chaplets (casting devices used to hold cores in place during a pour). Chaplets proved to be a more lucrative business than nails, and the company gradually shifted its production in that direction.

The business stayed in John Gray's barn until 1897, when it moved to the building on Adams that housed Gray's carriage works. At the same time, Needham sold out to the Gray brothers, and the company name was changed to the Crescent Machine Co. The company expanded from there, and soon the Gray brothers were working full-time at Crescent. In 1905, Crescent outgrew their lodgings on Adams, and built a new building on Trumbull just north of John Gray's property. A few years later, plumbing supplies were added to the manufacturing list, and the company changed its name to Crescent Brass & Pin Company.

The company produced multiple products over its history, although nails and chaplets continued to be the backbone of its business. Crescent stayed at the location on Trumbull until 1958, when, due to labor troubles, it moved to Americus, Georgia, and re-organized as Simplex Nails, Inc. Although some manufacturing operations were later returned to the Trumbull plant, operations in Detroit never fully recovered, and Crescent ceased manufacturing in Detroit in 1984, donating the building to the Society of Saint Vincent de Paul.

In September 2001, the building was purchased by 5766 Trumbull LLC with the intention of converting the former factory into affordable lofts. In spring 2005, construction began; a third floor was added to the original two-story structure and the entire building renovated into 35 loft spaces. In October 2006, the first new resident moved into the renovated building. The building has been renamed Research Lofts on Trumbull.

== Construction ==
The Detroit architectural firm of Rogers and MacFarlane designed the original building in 1905. This building exemplifies the standard timber frame mill construction that was popular in Michigan well into the early 20th century. The large posts and beams created relatively large spaces free from interspersed columns and easily adaptable to large machinery. Massive posts and exposed floor joists were constructed to slow the spread of fire and aid in its detection by eliminating hidden spaces.

The building was enlarged in several stages, the first in 1916, then later in 1917, 1924, and the early 1950s. These later additions were built using reinforced concrete, exemplifying the change in industrial architecture during the first part of the 20th century.
