= Bagley Memorial Fountain =

- U.S. National Register of Historic Places
- Michigan State Historic Site
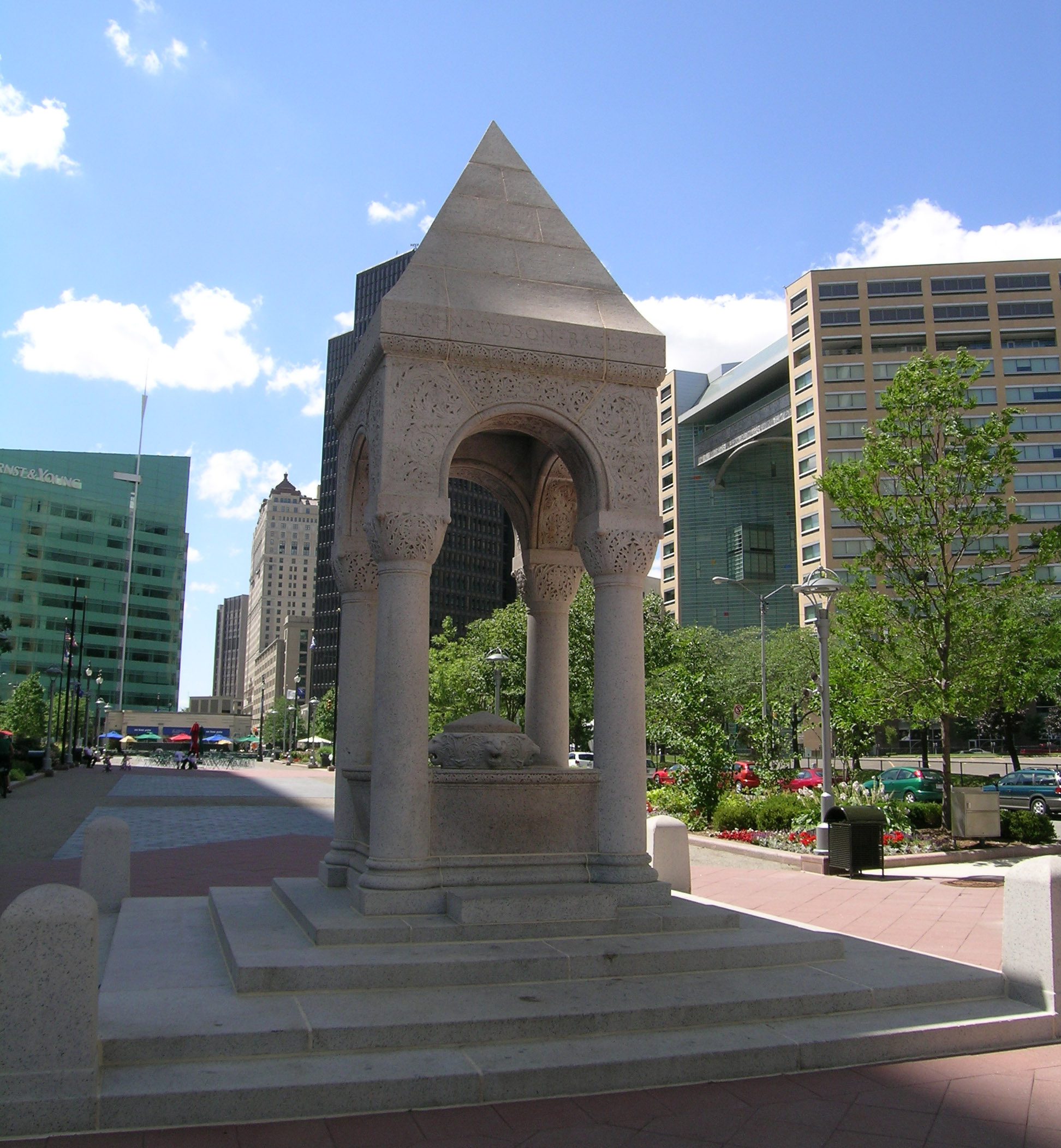
- Bagley Memorial Fountain at its new location on Cadillac Square facing Campus Martius
- Interactive map
- Location: Cadillac Square; Detroit, Michigan
- Coordinates: 42°19′53″N 83°2′42″W
- Built: 1885
- Architect: H. H. Richardson
- Architectural style: Italian Romanesque
- NRHP reference No.: 71000422

Significant dates
- Added to NRHP: November 05, 1971
- Designated MSHS: March 3, 1971

The Bagley Memorial Fountain is a historic fountain in Downtown Detroit, Michigan. It has recently been moved from its long-time location in Campus Martius Park to a new location just down the street in Cadillac Square Park. The fountain was listed on the National Register of Historic Places and designated a Michigan State Historic Site in 1971. The John N. Bagley House (1889) at 2921 East Jefferson Avenue in Detroit was constructed for Governor Bagley's son, and is also listed on the National Register of Historic Places.

== John J. Bagley ==
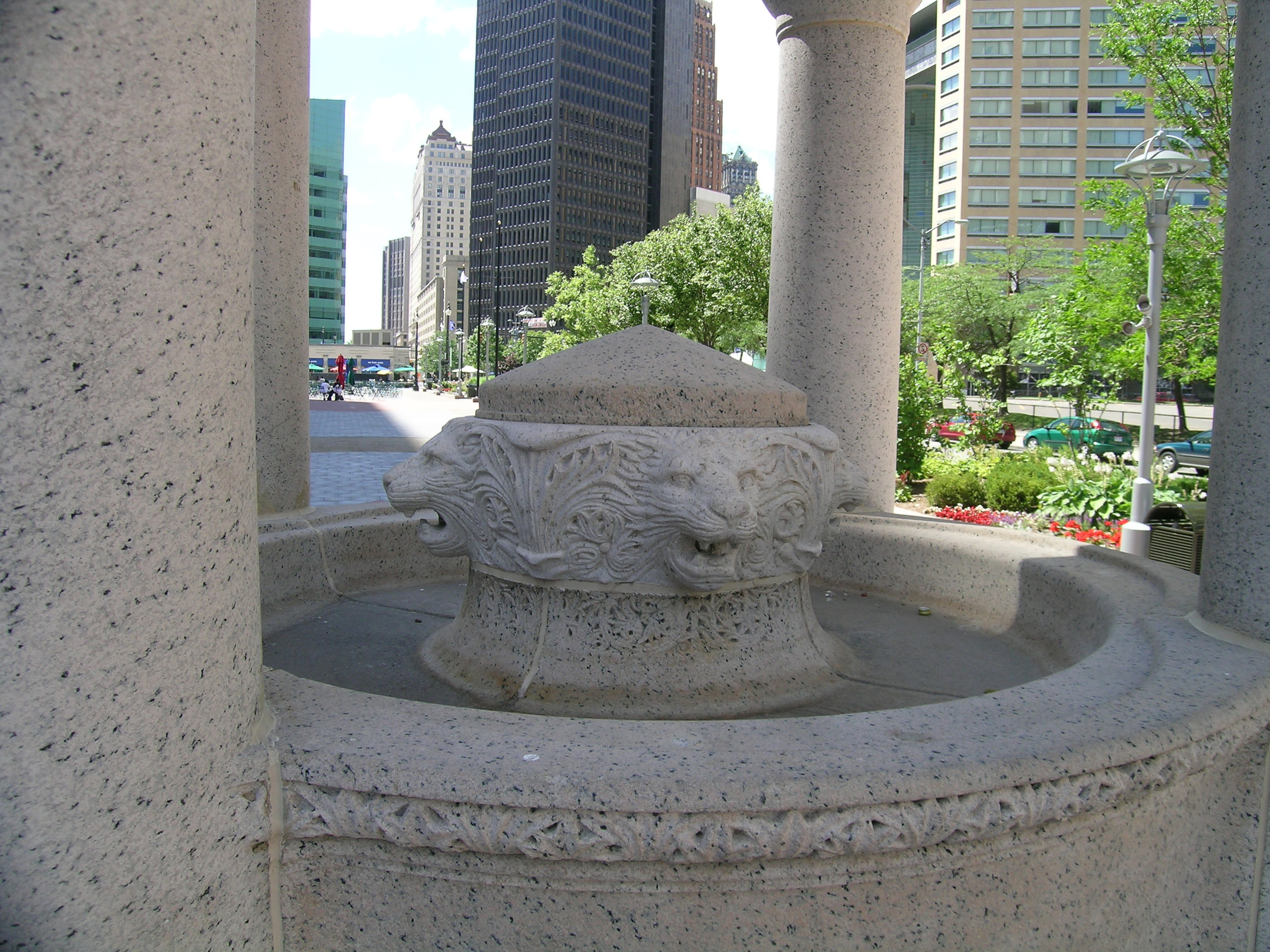
Lion detail on fountain

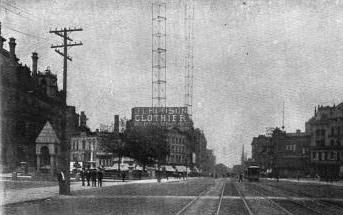
Woodward Avenue c. 1891 showing Bagley Fountain (far left)

John J. Bagley was the 16th governor of Michigan, serving from 1873 to 1877. Bagley also served as a Detroit Alderman from 1860 to 1861 and as Police Commissioner from 1865 to 1872. He was instrumental in the creation of the Detroit Metropolitan Police Commission and the construction of the first Detroit House of Corrections. When Bagley died in 1881, his will contained $5,000 for the construction of a drinking fountain for the people of Detroit, having "water cold and pure as the coldest mountain stream."

== Fountain ==
In 1885, the Bagley family chose Henry Hobson Richardson to design the fountain. In 1887, the Bagley Memorial Fountain was dedicated at the corner of Woodward Avenue and Fort Street. Richardson constructed the fountain entirely out of pink Bragville granite, modeled after a ciborium located in St. Mark's Basilica in Venice. The Bagley Memorial Fountain stands 21 feet high with a basin 7 feet across. At the center of the fountain, four lion heads distribute water. In the original design, two of the heads produced "normal" temperature water and the other two produced cold water, chilled by ice packed around the fountain pipes. The inscription on the four sides of the cornice reads: TESTAMENTARY GIFT | FOR THE PEOPLE FROM | JOHN JVDSON BAGLEY | A.D. MDCCCLXXXVII.

== Later moves ==
In 1926 the fountain was moved from its original home at Woodward and Fort to Campus Martius, because of the increase of automobile traffic. In 2000, the fountain was removed from its site, disassembled, and put into storage. In 2007, the fountain was installed in its current location in Cadillac Square; a new lion fountainhead replaced the original, which was stolen. It is the only remaining work by Richardson in the Detroit area.

== See also ==
- Drinking fountains in the United States
