= Michigan Central Railroad =

American railroad

- Michigan Central Railroad (red) and New York Central system (orange) as of 1918

Overview
- Headquarters: Detroit, Michigan
- Locale: Illinois, Indiana, Michigan, Ontario
- Founder: John Biddle
- Dates of operation: 1841–1995
- Predecessor: Detroit & St. Joseph Railroad
- Successor: New York Central Railroad

Technical
- Track gauge: 4 ft 8 1/2 in (1,435 mm) standard gauge

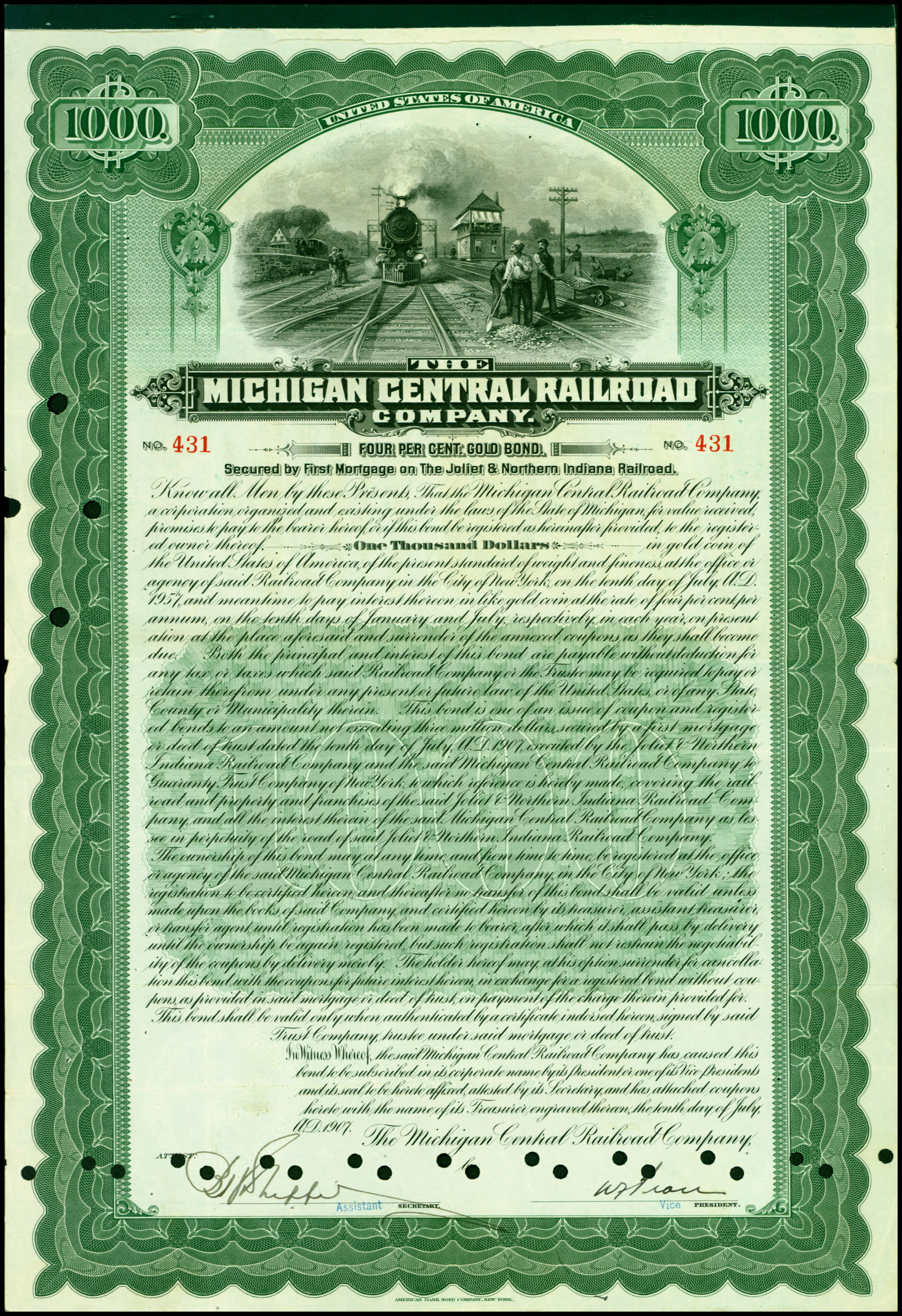
Gold Bond of the Michigan Central Railroad Company, issued 10 July 1907

The Michigan Central Railroad (reporting mark MC) was originally chartered in 1832 to establish rail service between Detroit, Michigan, and St. Joseph, Michigan. The railroad later operated in the states of Michigan, Indiana, and Illinois in the United States and the province of Ontario in Canada. After about 1867 the railroad was controlled by the New York Central Railroad, which later became part of Penn Central and then Conrail. After the 1998 Conrail breakup, Norfolk Southern Railway now owns much of the former Michigan Central trackage.

At the end of 1925, MC operated 1,871 miles (3,011 km) of road and 4,139 miles (6,661 km) of track; that year it reported 4,304,000 net ton-miles of revenue freight and 600 million passenger-miles.

== Genealogy ==
- Michigan Central Railroad
  - Battle Creek and Bay City Railroad 1889
  - Buchanan and St. Joseph River Railroad 1897
  - Central Railroad of Michigan 1837–1846
    - Detroit and St. Joseph Railroad 1831–1837
  - Detroit and Bay City Railroad 1881
  - Detroit and Charlevoix Railroad 1916
    - Frederick and Charlevoix Railroad 1901
  - Detroit River Tunnel Company Railroad 1918
  - Jackson, Lansing and Saginaw Railroad 1871
    - Amboy, Lansing and Traverse Bay Railroad 1866
    - Grand River Valley Railroad 1870
  - Joliet and Northern Indiana Railroad 1851
  - Kalamazoo and South Haven Railroad 1870
  - Michigan Air Line Railway 1870
  - Michigan Midland and Canada Railroad 1878
  - Saginaw Bay and Northwestern Railroad 1884
    - Pinconning Railroad 1879
      - Glencoe, Pinconning and Lake Shore Railroad 1878
  - St. Louis, Sturgis and Battle Creek Railroad 1889

== History ==
The line between Detroit and St. Joseph, Michigan, was originally planned in 1830 to provide freight service between Detroit and Chicago by train to St. Joseph and via boat service on to Chicago. The Detroit and St. Joseph Railroad was chartered in 1831 with a capital of $1,500,000. The railroad actually began construction on May 18, 1836, starting at "King's Corner" in Detroit, which was the name by which the southeast corner of Jefferson and Woodward Avenue was then known. However, this is not the location of Michigan Central Station, which apparently replaced this building.

The small private organization quickly ran into problems securing cheap land in the private market, and abandonment of the project was discussed. The City of Detroit invested $50,000 in the project. The State of Michigan bailed out the railroad in 1837 by purchasing it and investing $5,000,000. The now state-owned company was renamed the Central Railroad of Michigan.

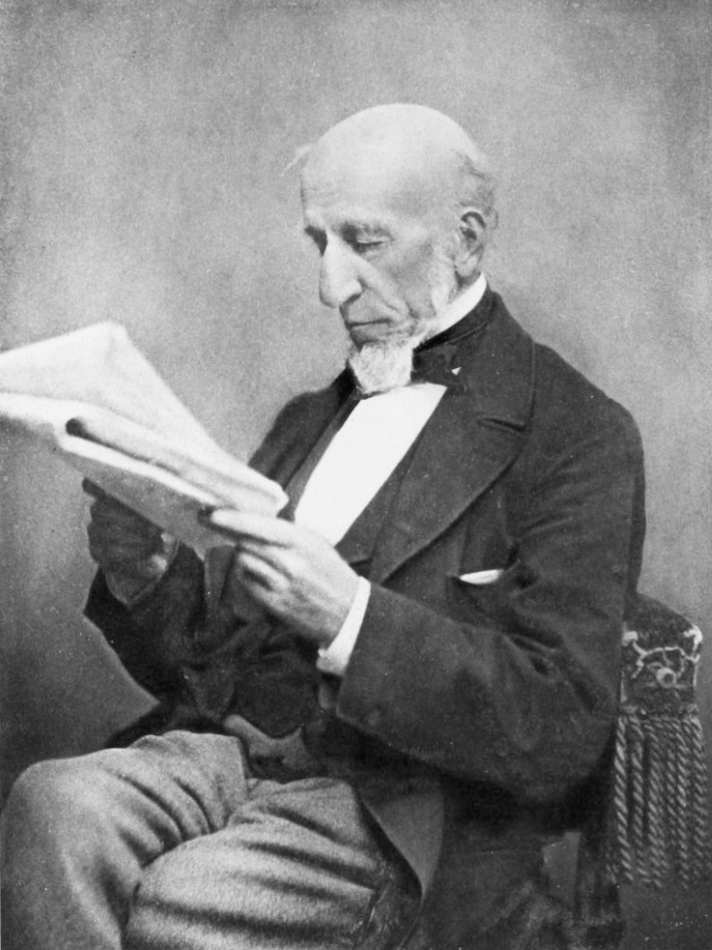
John Murray Forbes, President of Michigan Central Railroad from 1846 to 1855

By 1840 the railroad was again out of money and had completed track only between Detroit and Dexter, Michigan. In 1846, the state sold the railroad to the newly incorporated Michigan Central corporation for $2,000,000. By this time the railroad had reached Kalamazoo, Michigan, a distance of 143.16 miles (230.39 km).

The new private corporation had committed to complete the railroad with T-rail of not less than sixty pounds to the yard and also to replace the poorly built rails between Kalamazoo and Detroit with similar quality rail, as the state-built rail was of low quality. The new owners met this obligation by building the rest of the line some 74.84 miles (120.44 km) to the shores of Lake Michigan by 1849. However, rather than go to St. Joseph, instead they went to New Buffalo. This was because they had decided to extend the road all the way to Chicago. With this, the first crossing of the state of Michigan (Lower Peninsula) was completed.

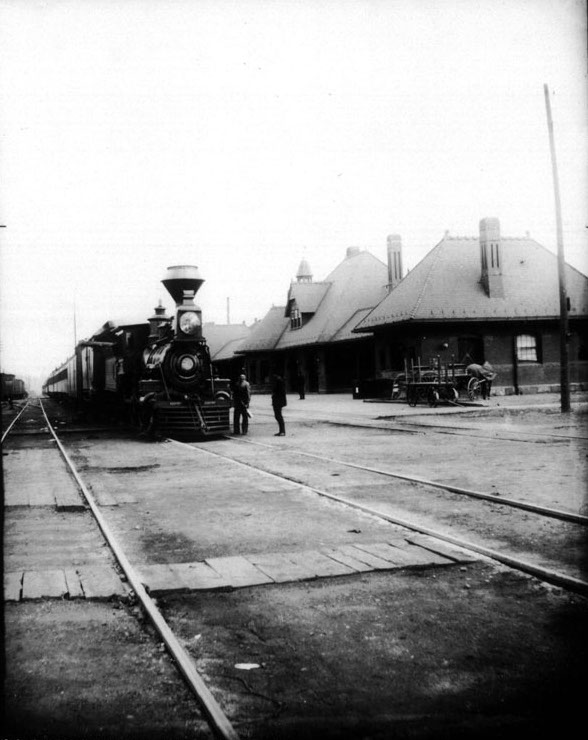
Michigan Central train arriving in Kalamazoo, Michigan, 1887

This involved passing through two other states and getting leave from two state legislatures to do so. To facilitate this process, they bought the Joliet and Northern Indiana Railroad in 1851. Thus they reached Michigan City, Indiana, by 1850 and finished the line to Kensington, Illinois, (now a south Chicago neighborhood) in 1852, using Illinois Central trackage rights to downtown Chicago. The completed railroad was 270 miles (430 km) in length. In the same year the first train ran from Detroit to Chicago.

The first repair shops were built in 1851 and located on 20 acres of waterfront property in Detroit, Michigan. In 1873 they were moved to a larger plot of land on the west side of the city along Livernois Avenue, then consisting of two roundhouses and car repair shops. In 1919 new freight and locomotive terminals were constructed in Niles, Michigan. However, the primary locomotive and car repair shops during the steam era were located in Jackson, Michigan, established in 1871. They closed in 1949 during a coal strike and never reopened due to the conversion of motive power to diesel engines.

== Passenger services ==
The Michigan Central Railroad (MCR) operated mostly passenger trains between Chicago and Detroit. These trains ranged from locals to the Wolverine. In 1904, MCR began a long-term lease of Canada Southern Railway (CSR), which operated the most direct route between Detroit and New York. CSR's mainline cut through the heart of southwestern Ontario, between Windsor and Fort Erie.

The new service, known as the Canada Division Passenger Service, saw a major surge beginning at the start of the 1920s. Between 1920 and 1922, the legendary Wolverine passenger train operated in two sections, five days per week along CSR's mainline. Then, in the summer of 1923, the eastbound Wolverine began running from Detroit to Buffalo without any scheduled stops in Canada, making the trip in 4 hours and 50 minutes, an unprecedented achievement. During the same summer, the Canada Division was moving 2,300 through passengers per day. By the end of the decade, a fleet of 205 J-1 class Hudsons – one of the most powerful locomotives for passenger service yet designed – was hauling passengers along the CSR mainline. However, by the 1930s the Wolverine was making stops in the Canadian section of the route. Also, by the late 1940s, the Empire State Express passed from Buffalo into Southwestern Ontario; however, it terminated at Detroit.

While Michigan Central was an independent subsidiary of the New York Central System, passenger trains were staged from Illinois Central's Central Station (in Chicago) as a tenant. When MC operations were completely integrated into NYC in the 1950s, trains were re-deployed to NYC's LaSalle Street Station home, where other NYC trains such as the 20th Century Limited were staged. IC sued for breach of contract and won because the MC had a lease that ran for a few more years. The MC route from Chicago to Porter, Indiana, is mostly intact. The Kensington Interchange, shared with the South Shore Line, was cut out. These tracks now belong to Indiana Harbor Belt Railroad, and are overgrown stub tracks ending short of the interchange. Some trackage around the Indiana Harbor Belt's Gibson Yard has also been removed. The MC's South Water Street freight trackage in downtown Chicago is also gone. Amtrak trains serving the Michigan Central Detroit line now use the former NYC to Porter, where they turn north on Michigan Central. Passenger equipment was mostly similar to that of parent New York Central System. Typically this meant an EMD E-series locomotive and Pullman-Standard lightweight rolling stock. Because General Motors (Electro-Motive Division) was a large customer of Michigan Central, use of Alco or General Electric locomotives was less common.

== Freight services ==
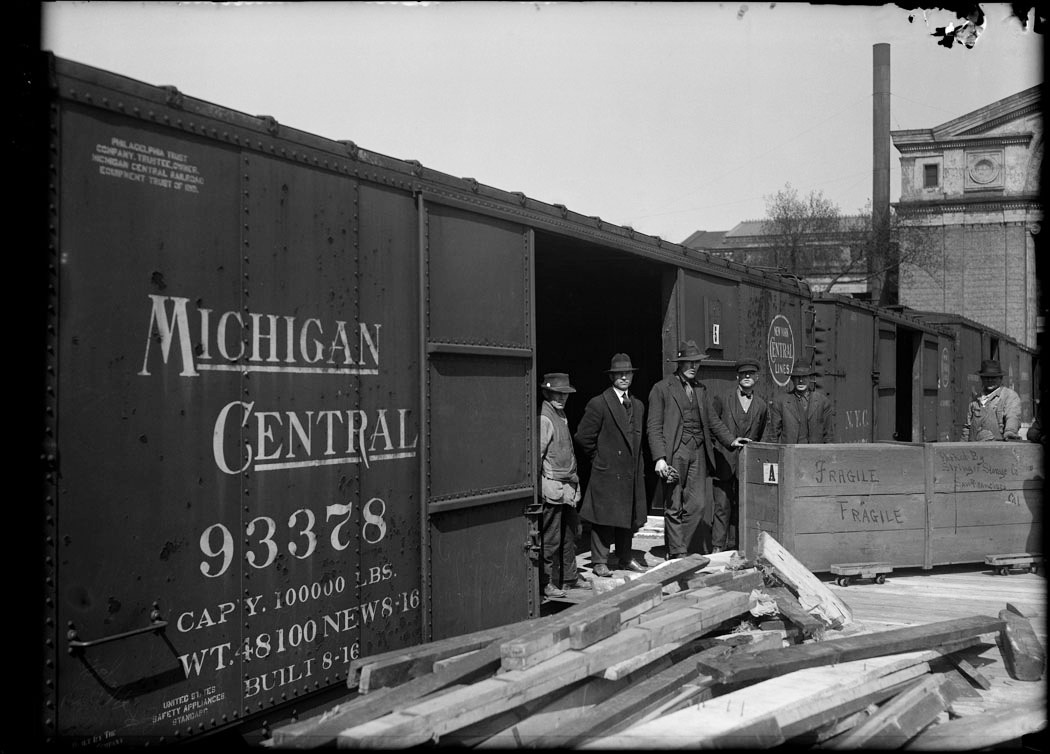
Loading dock with a Michigan Central boxcar in 1920

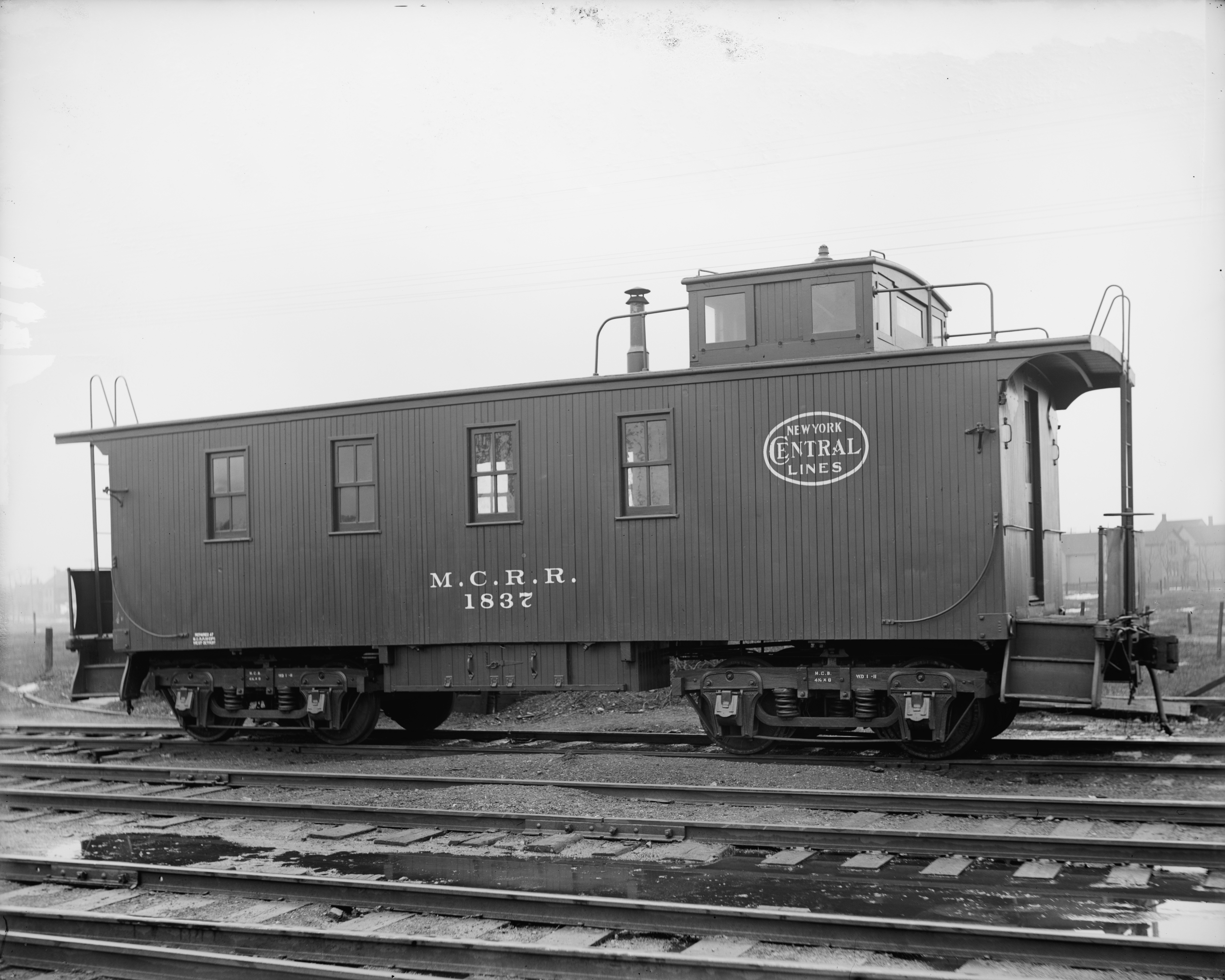
A Michigan Central caboose

Prior to the automobile, Michigan Central was mostly a carrier of natural resources. Michigan had extensive reserves of timber at the time, and the Michigan Central owned lines from east to west of the state and north to south, tapping all resources available. After the advent of the automobile as one of the most dominant forces of commerce, with Detroit at the epicenter, the Michigan Central became a carrier of autos and auto-related parts. The Michigan Central was one of the few Michigan railroads with a direct line into Chicago, meaning it did not have to operate cross-lake ferries, as did virtually all other railroads operating in Michigan, such as the Pere Marquette, Pennsylvania, Grand Trunk, and Ann Arbor Railroads. Michigan Central was part owner of the Straits of Mackinac ferry service operated to the Upper Peninsula as well as cross-river ferry service to Ontario, but these routes did not exist to circumvent Chicago.

== Service to Canada ==
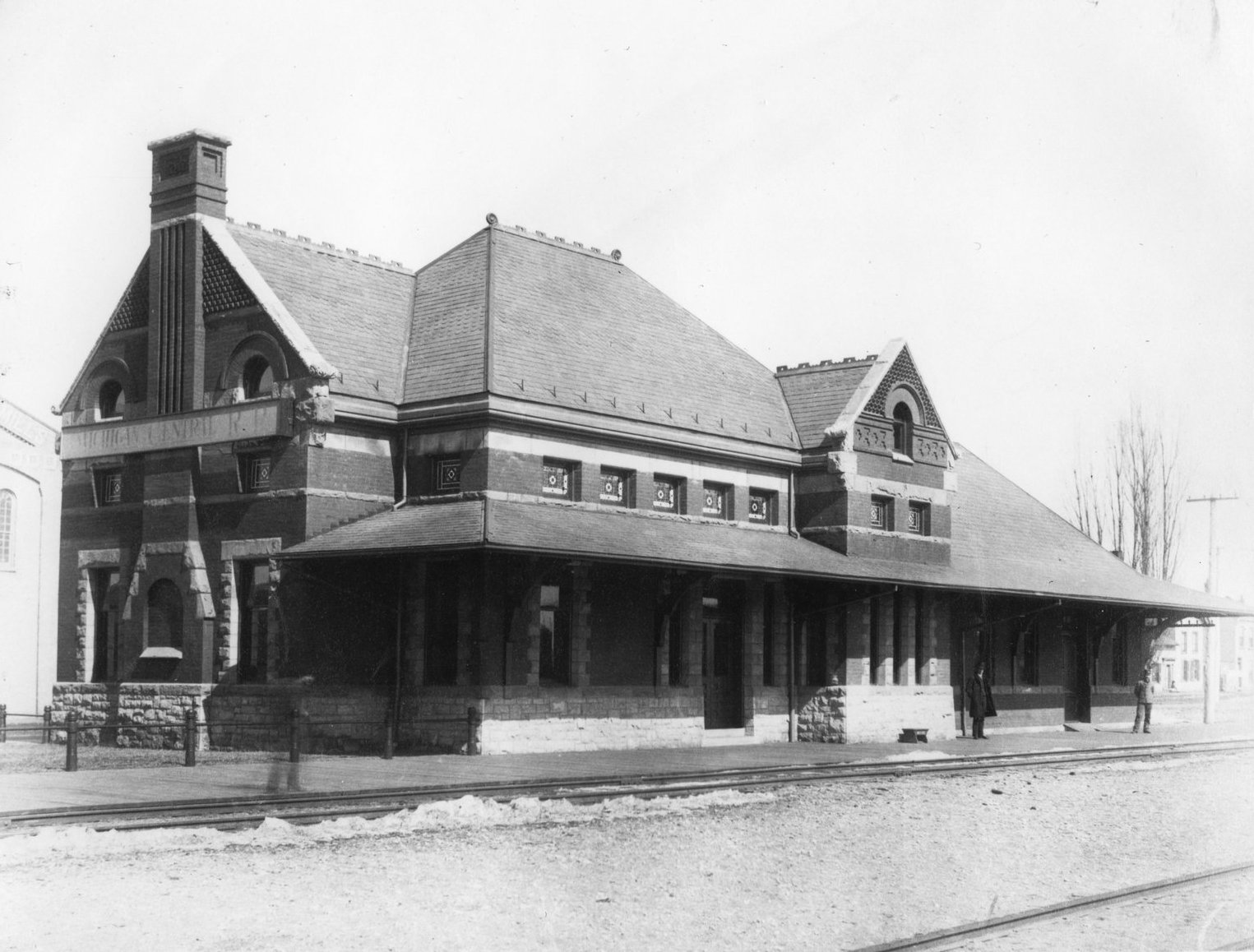
Michigan Central Station in London, Ontario, ca. 1890

The Michigan Central Railroad (MCR) and then parent New York Central Railroad (NYC) owned the Canada Southern Railroad (CSR), which had lines throughout southwestern Ontario from Windsor to Niagara Falls. The railroad operated a car-float service over the Detroit River from 1883; an immersed tube tunnel under the Detroit River between Detroit, Michigan, and Windsor, Ontario; and the MCR cantilever bridge at Niagara Falls, which was later replaced with a steel arch bridge in 1925. The car-float operation ended when the Detroit River tunnel was completed.

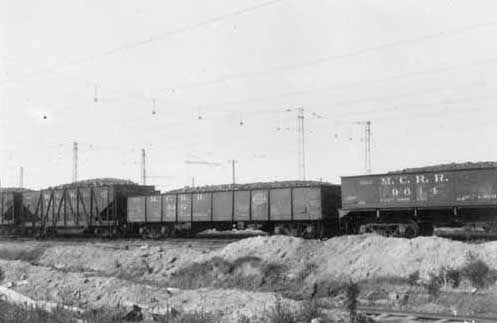
Michigan Central steel gondolas seen in Port Stanley, Ontario in 1915

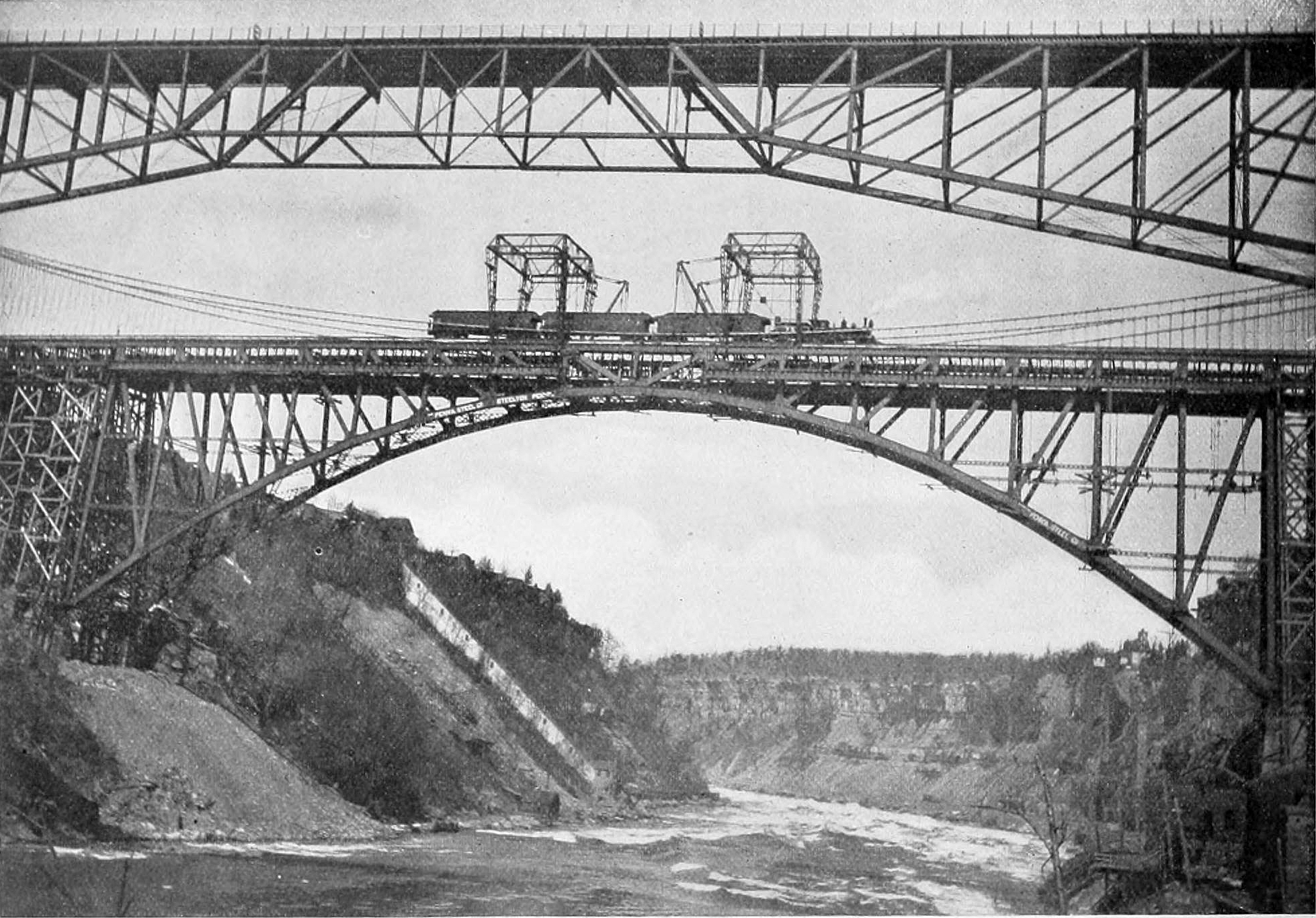
The Niagara Cantilever Bridge (1892)

Control of Canada Southern passed from MCR to NYC, then Penn Central, then Conrail. In 1985, the Canada Southern was sold to two companies, the Canadian National Railway and the Canadian Pacific Railway.

The Michigan Central Railway Bridge opened in February 1925 and remained in use until the early 21st century. It replaced the earlier Niagara Cantilever Bridge which had been commissioned in 1883 by Cornelius Vanderbilt; the older bridge was scrapped as the new MCR bridge went into service. The MCR cantilever bridge was inducted into the North America Railway Hall of Fame in 2006, long after it had been scrapped. The Hall of Fame report discussed its significance to the railway industry in the category of "North America: Facilities & Structures."

== Railroad ferry and car float service ==
All major Michigan railroads except the Michigan Central operated a rail ferry service across Lake Michigan. The MC had the most direct route across Southern Michigan from Detroit to Chicago. The Michigan Central also had the best access to Chicago of any Michigan railroad. The Michigan Central did own part of the Mackinac Transportation Company, which operated the SS Chief Wawatam until 1984. The Chief Wawatam was a front-loading, hand-fired, coal-fed steamer. It was the last hand-fired steamer in the free world at its long-overdue retirement in 1984. The Chief Wawatam continued to operate until 2009, cut down to a barge. One Chief Wawatam engine was salvaged and restored by the Wisconsin Maritime Museum. Other artifacts from the ferry, including the whistle, wheel, telegraphs, and furniture, are preserved by the Mackinac Island State Park Commission in Mackinaw City. Car floats also ran across the Detroit River to Windsor, Ontario, for high and wide loads that could not fit through the tunnels.

== Competitors ==
The major competitors of the Michigan Central were:

- Grand Trunk Western, controlled by Canadian National (operations integrated with and now operated as CN)
- Pere Marquette, controlled by C&O (formally merged in 1947 and now owned by CSX)
- Ann Arbor (controlled by Wabash, then DT&I; now owned by Great Lakes Central Railroad and the new Ann Arbor Railroad (1988)
- Pennsylvania Railroad (merged into Penn Central with MC/NYC, then into Conrail; owned by various railroads)

== Major accidents ==
On June 22, 1918, the engineer of a Michigan Central troop train fell asleep, causing the train to run into the rear of a Hagenbeck–Wallace Circus train that was stopped near Hammond, Indiana. The accident resulted in 86 deaths, with another 127 people injured.

On February 27, 1921, the Michigan Central's 'Canadian' ran a red signal at Porter, Indiana, and entered a diamond crossing in front of the New York Central's 'Interstate Express'. The 'Canadian's locomotive hit the derailer, slid through the crossing on the ties, and was rerailed by the crossing's frog, the tender and first several cars of the train remained derailed as they rode the ties. The train stopped with the Michigan Central locomotive about 400 feet beyond the crossing and the first coach fouling the crossing. The 'Interstate Express' locomotive (NYC 4828) hit the wooden coach broadside, demolishing it, killing 35 passengers, and injuring 11. Locomotive 4828 derailed upon hitting the coach and went off the track to the right; its pilot dug into the dirt, and the locomotive whipped around and slammed over on its side, facing in the direction from which it came. Both the engineer and the fireman were killed in the wreck, making the death toll 37.

== Significant stations and structures ==
=== Jackson station ===
The MCR Jackson station in Jackson, Michigan, opened in 1873 and is the oldest continuously operated passenger station in North America.

=== Dexter station ===
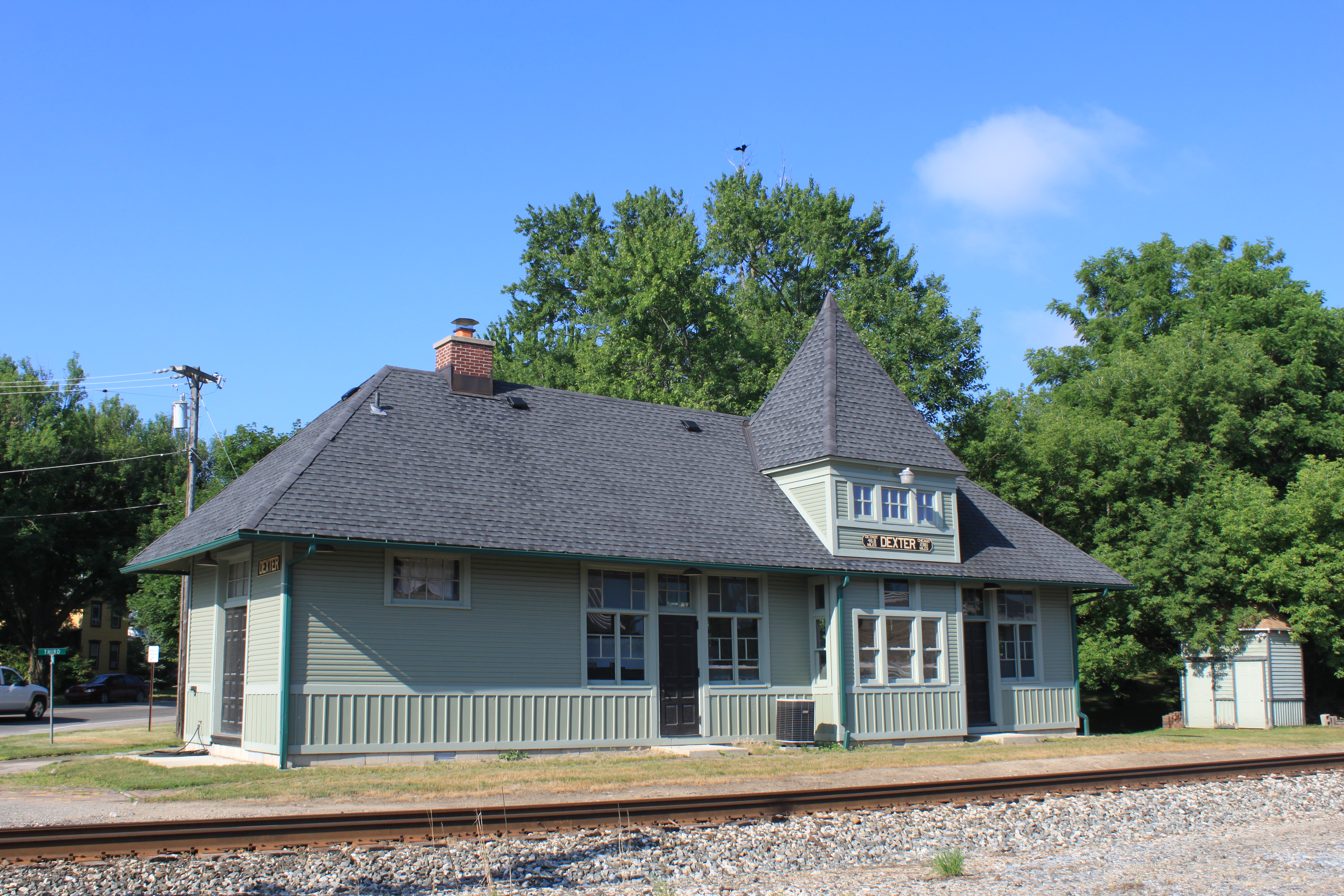
Michigan Central Railroad Dexter Depot

The Dexter, Michigan, train depot was built to replace a former station that had burned down. It served passenger trains until the early 1950s. Today, the station is home to the Ann Arbor Model Railroad Club, which hosts open houses the first Wednesday of each month. It also has some railroad memorabilia such as an old crossing signal and baggage cart.

=== Detroit station ===
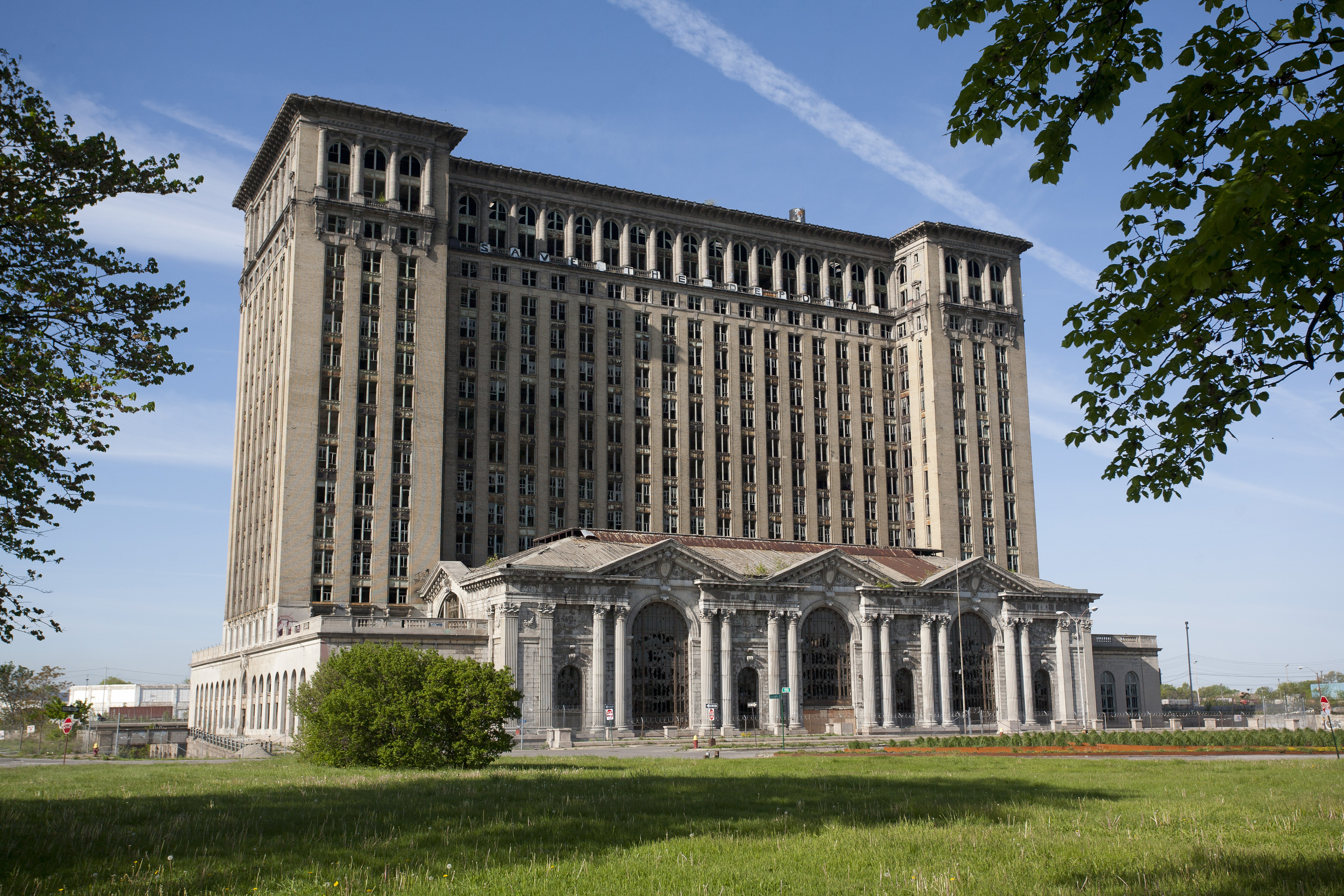
Michigan Central Station in Detroit in 2010

Michigan Central was the owner of Michigan Central Station in Detroit. Opened in 1913, the building is of the Beaux-Arts Classical style of architecture, designed by the Warren and Wetmore and Reed and Stem firms who also designed New York City's Grand Central Terminal. As such, Michigan Central Station bears more than a passing resemblance to New York's famed rail station. It was the world's tallest railroad terminal at that time.

Last used by Amtrak in 1988, Michigan Central Station then become a victim of extensive vandalism. Over the next 30 years, several proposals and concepts for redevelopment were suggested, none coming to fruition. The estimated cost of renovations was $80 million, but the owners viewed finding the right use as a greater problem than financing. Though listed on the National Register of Historic Places, the Detroit City Council passed a resolution to demolish the station in April 2009. The council was met with strong opposition from Detroit resident Stanley Christmas, who in turn, sued the city of Detroit to stop the demolition effort, citing the National Historic Preservation Act of 1966. The station shows up in the first part of the Godfrey Reggio movie Naqoyqatsi and is frequently used by Michael Bay in such films as The Island and Transformers. In May 2018, Ford Motor Company purchased the building for redevelopment into a mixed use facility and cornerstone of the company's new Corktown campus.

=== Niles station ===
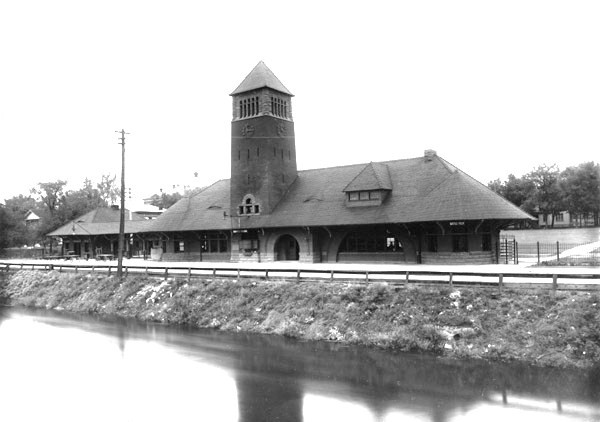
Michigan Central Station, Battle Creek

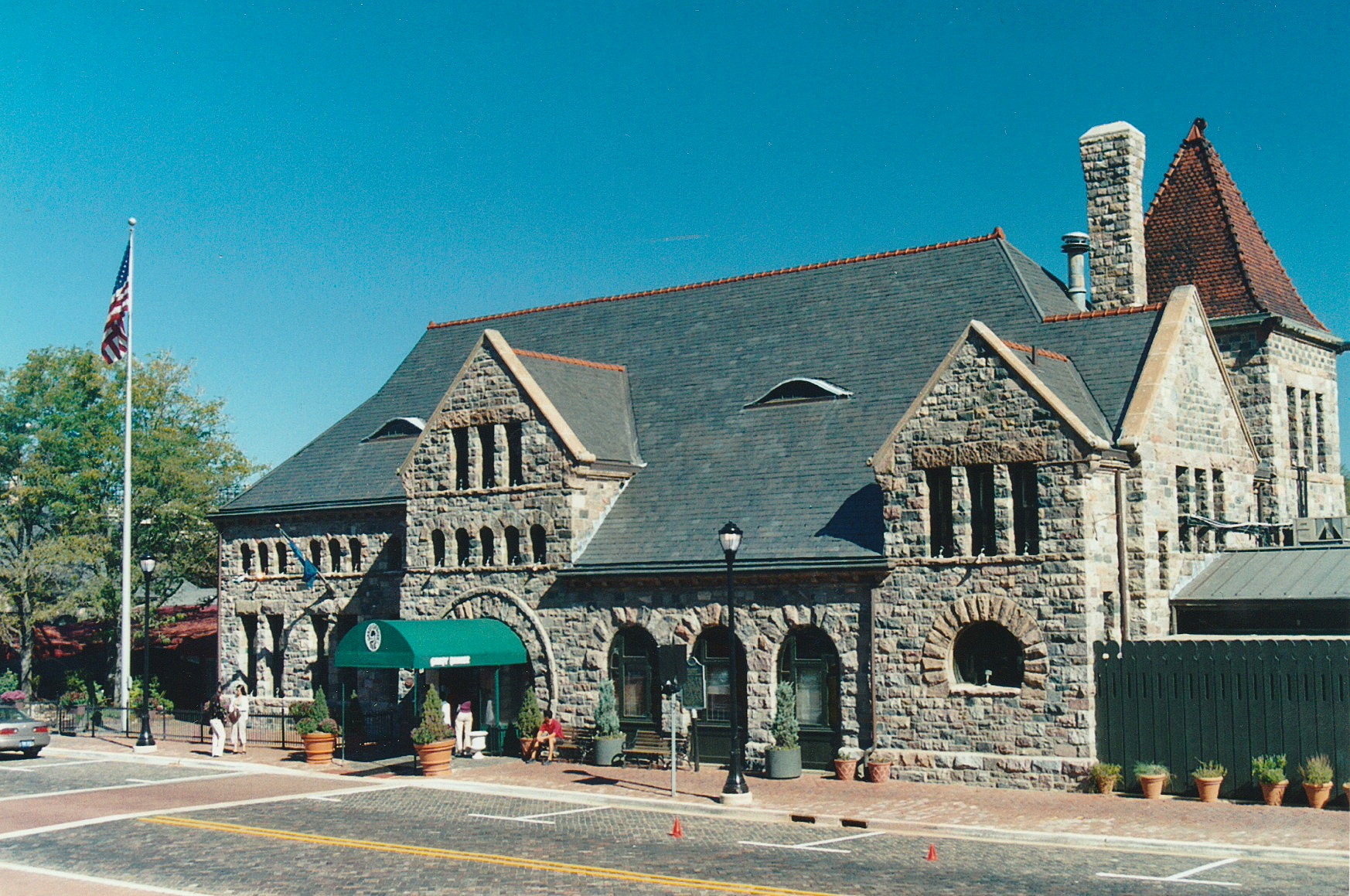
Former Michigan Central Station in Ann Arbor

The Michigan Central station at Niles, Michigan, is also famous, having appeared in several Hollywood movies. It is listed on the National Register of Historic Places.

=== Battle Creek station ===
The Michigan Central Railroad Depot (Battle Creek, MI) opened on July 27, 1888. Rogers and MacFarlane of Detroit designed the depot, one of several Richardsonian Romanesque-style stations between Detroit and Chicago in the late nineteenth century. Thomas Edison as well as presidents William Howard Taft and Gerald Ford visited here. The depot was acquired by the New York Central Railroad in 1918, Penn Central in 1968 and Amtrak in 1970. The depot was listed on the National Register of Historic Places in 1971 and is now Clara's on the River Restaurant.

=== Augusta coaling tower ===
Located between Augusta and Galesburg Michigan, the massive re-enforced concrete building stands over the Detroit to Chicago mainline. Built in 1923, it was used to refuel and water steam engines. It fell out of use post-World War II, as diesel engines came onto the scene.

=== Ann Arbor station ===
The former Michigan Central Station in Ann Arbor, Michigan, a granite stone block building built in 1886 and designed by Frederick Spier of Spier and Rohns, is listed on the National Register of Historic Places and now houses the Gandy Dancer Restaurant.

=== Trail Creek swing bridge ===
The Michigan Central also built and operated a swing bridge over Trail Creek at Michigan City, Indiana. This swing bridge is similar to the moving span at Spuyten Duyvil owned by parent New York Central, but has no approach spans. It is still in operation and owned by Amtrak.

== Historic equipment ==
No historic Michigan Central-specific equipment exists today. After the steam era, almost all equipment was lettered for New York Central. Many common New York Central locomotives and rolling stock are preserved in places like Illinois Railway Museum and the National New York Central Museum, in Elkhart, Indiana. The latter includes a sample passenger train in NYC livery, although the two coaches are actually of Illinois Central heritage. The E8 and observation car are original NYC equipment and very likely served on the Michigan Central after dieselization. The station in Dexter, Michigan, has some railroad memorabilia around it, such as an old level crossing signal and a baggage cart.

== Modern operations ==
The Michigan Central, having been only a "paper" railroad for decades and not owning any track since the late 1970s, was merged into United Railroad Corp. (a subsidiary of Penn Central) on December 7, 1995. Today, Norfolk Southern owns most trackage not abandoned in the early 1980s. Lake State Railway now operates the remnants former Detroit-Mackinaw City line from Bay City to Gaylord, which is partially owned by the state of Michigan. What remained of Canada Southern Railway was mostly abandoned by Canadian National in 2011, after seeing little to no traffic for years. Amtrak owns the Detroit line from Porter, Indiana, to Kalamazoo, Michigan, while the state of Michigan owns the line from there to Dearborn, Michigan. This line is a projected "high speed" line; a portion of the line was converted to 110 MPH operation in early 2012 with further upgrades planned. Amtrak operates three Chicago-Detroit-Pontiac trains each way per day, under the old banner Wolverine. The Port Huron train (the Blue Water) also uses this line as far east as Battle Creek, Michigan. Both Kalamazoo and Niles have retained their old Michigan Central Stations; the Niles station is occasionally portrayed in film. Also the Dowagiac station is used by Amtrak which was built by M.C.R.R.

== Proposed rebirth as an independent railroad ==
In July 2007, Norfolk Southern was in talks with Watco, a shortline holding company, to sell the Kalamazoo-Detroit portion of the Michigan Central main line. The proposal was set before the Surface Transportation Board, and was officially endorsed by Amtrak in September 2007. In December 2007 the STB rejected the plan, citing concerns over the relationship between the Norfolk Southern and Watco. Labor unions had raised concerns over the transfer of operations to a substantially non-transportation company, under which different labor regulations would apply.

== See also ==
- Michigan Central Railway Bridge connecting Niagara Falls, New York to Niagara Falls, Ontario
- Michigan Central Railway Tunnel connecting Detroit, Michigan to Windsor, Ontario
