= Battle Creek station (Michigan Central Railroad) =

Station in Battle Creek, Michigan

Battle Creek
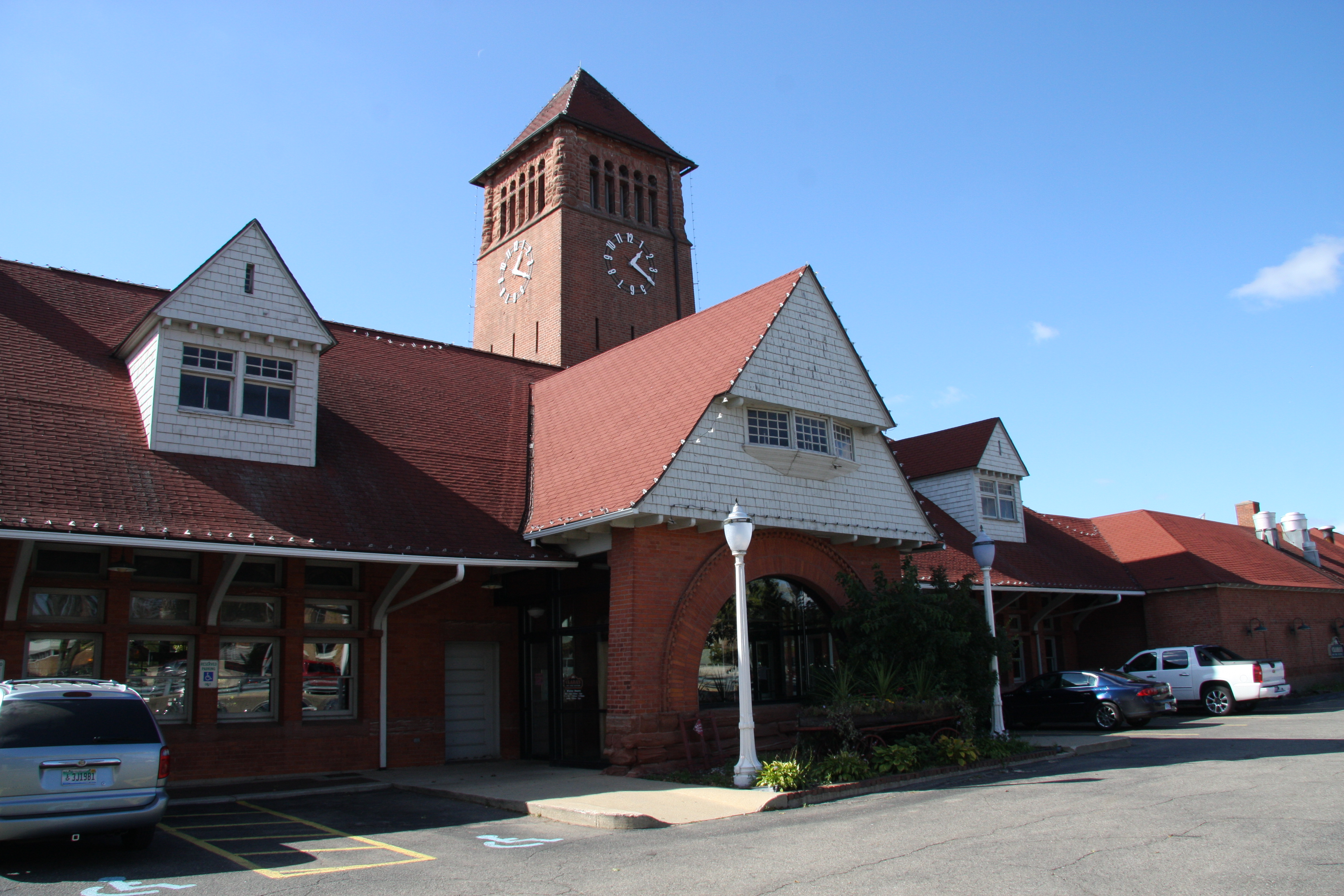
- The old Michigan Central Depot in Battle Creek, Michigan

General information
- Location: 44 McCamly Street N., Battle Creek, Calhoun County, Michigan 49017

Former services
Preceding station	New York Central Railroad	Following station
Augusta (Michigan) toward Chicago	Michigan Central Railroad Main Line	Marshall toward Buffalo
- Penn Central Railway Station
- U.S. National Register of Historic Places
- Michigan State Historic Site
- Location within Michigan Location within the United States
- Location: 44 McCamly Street N. Battle Creek, Michigan
- Coordinates: 42°19′16″N 85°10′53″W
- Built: 1888
- Architect: Rogers and MacFarlane
- Architectural style: Richardsonian Romanesque
- NRHP reference No.: 71000384

Significant dates
- Added to NRHP: April 16, 1971
- Designated MSHS: November 6, 1970
Location

Battle Creek station, listed in the National Register of Historic Places as the Penn Central Railway Station, is a disused train station in Battle Creek, Michigan. It opened on July 27, 1888.

== Design ==
Rogers and MacFarlane of Detroit designed the depot, one of several Richardsonian Romanesque-style stations between Detroit and Chicago in the late nineteenth century. Masonry of Lake Superior red sandstone, noted for its distinctive patterns, provides one of the most striking aspects of the Depot's exterior. Another prominent feature of the Depot is its clock tower.

== History ==
Thomas Edison as well as Presidents William Howard Taft and Gerald Ford visited here. The depot was acquired by the New York Central Railroad in 1918, Penn Central in 1968, and Amtrak in 1970. The depot was listed on the National Register of Historic Places in 1971.

The station served New York Central trains on the Chicago - Detroit route, such as the Chicago Mercury and the Twilight Limited and trains on the Chicago - Detroit - New York (via southwestern Ontario) itinerary, such as the Wolverine.

In 1982, Amtrak moved operations to a newer facility located five blocks to the south on the Grand Trunk Western Railroad line, as part of a line consolidation that saw Conrail's ex-New York Central line through downtown closed and removed. The current Amtrak station services the Detroit to Chicago, and the Port Huron, MI to Chicago routes. The Michigan Central Depot sat empty for seven years.

In 1989, restaurateurs Peter Jubeck and Ross Simpson purchased the depot and transformed it into a restaurant named Clara's on the River which opened June 8, 1992. Clara's on the River was a sister restaurant to the now closed Clara's Lansing Station, located in the Union Depot (Lansing, Michigan), which is now a Starbucks.
