= Isabella, Fayette County, Pennsylvania =

Unincorporated community in Pennsylvania, US

- Unincorporated community
- Location in Pennsylvania Isabella (the United States)
- Coordinates: 39°56′38″N 79°56′10″W
- Country: United States
- State: Pennsylvania
- County: Fayette
- Township: Luzerne
- Elevation: 922 ft (281 m)
- Time zone: UTC-5 (Eastern (EST))
  - Summer (DST): UTC-4 (EDT)
- ZIP codes: 15417
- Area code: 724
- FIPS code: 42-37216
- GNIS feature ID: 1177874

Isabella is a populated place situated in Luzerne Township in Fayette County, Pennsylvania, United States. It has an estimated elevation of 922 feet (281 m) above sea level.
