= Rogers and MacFarlane =

US architectural firm

Coordinates: 42.33041°N 83.0475°W

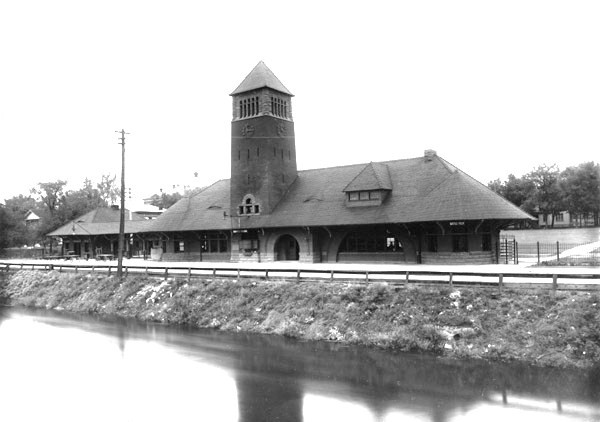
Michigan Central Railroad Depot, Battle Creek, Michigan - Now Clara's on the River restaurant

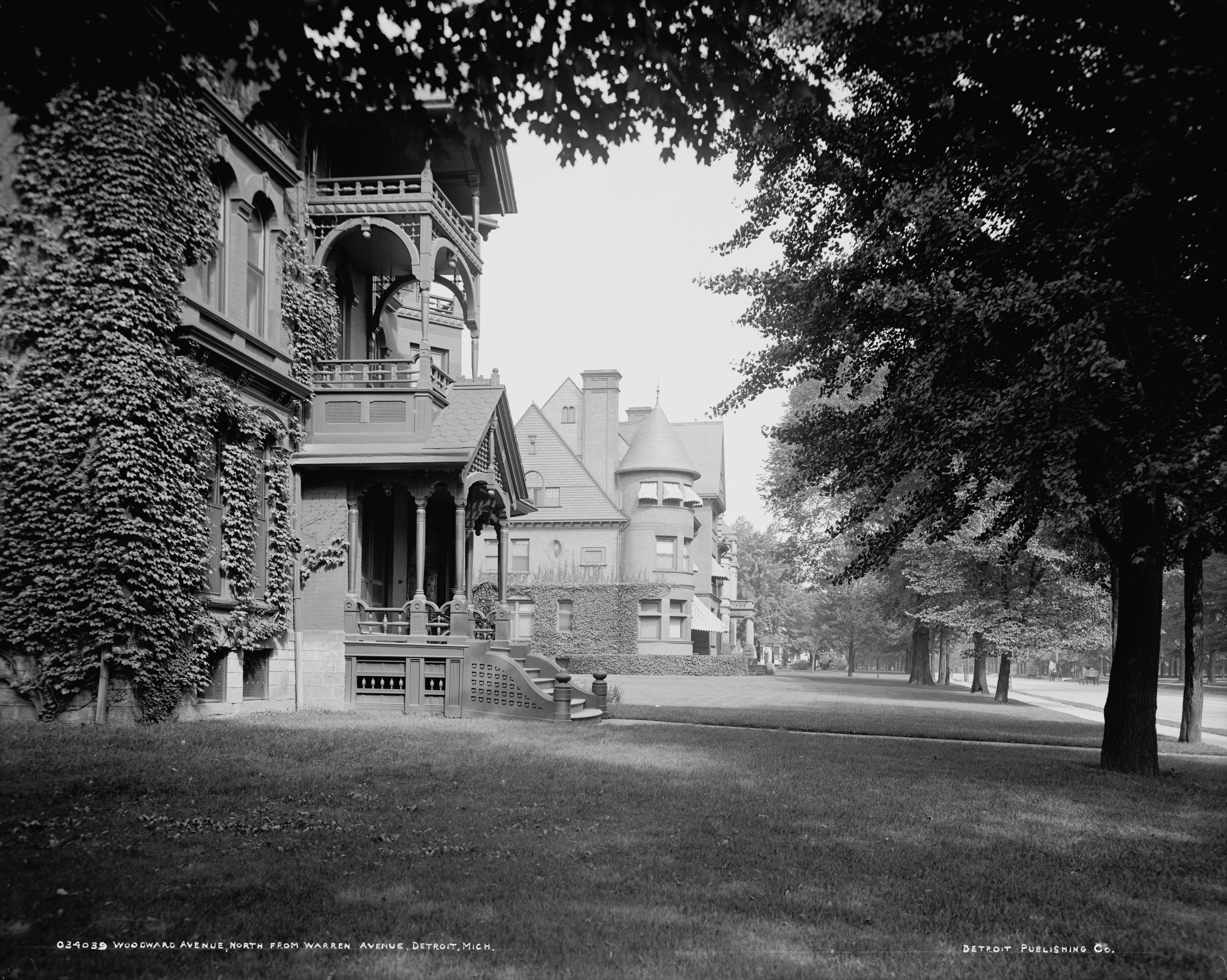
The Samuel Smith House (midground) c. 1900, looking north from the corner of Woodward and Warren, Detroit, Michigan

Rogers and MacFarlane was an architectural firm based in Detroit, Michigan, founded in 1885 by James S. Rogers and Walter MacFarlane. The firm produced commissions in Detroit and southern Michigan from 1885 until 1912.

James S. Rogers (born in Alexandria, Virginia, December 5, 1859) was the son of James S. and Virginia (Leef) Rogers. He was educated in the public schools of Baltimore, Maryland, and attended Baltimore City College, and Massachusetts Institute of Technology. He married Eleanore White at Adamstown, Maryland, in June, 1895. He was the co-founder of the firm of Rogers & MacFarlane, then later Rogers & Bonnah, with offices at 1330 Penobscot Building in Detroit. He resided at 183 Seminole Avenue, Detroit, Michigan.

Walter MacFarlane (born in Cold Spring, New York, June 15, 1859) attended Detroit Public Schools, and was a student at West Point, although he was not college–trained in architecture. He was first employed in the architect's office of Mr. Lloyd in Detroit. Later, he co-founded Rogers & MacFarlane, which maintained offices in Detroit for almost thirty years. MacFarlane left the firm in 1910 after suffering a nervous breakdown. After resting in Colorado and Arizona, he returned to Detroit in 1912 and formed a partnership with Walter Maul and Walter Lenz, architectural graduates of the University of Michigan (MacFarlane, Maul, and Lentz). MacFarlane married Mildred A. Griffin of New York October 14, 1914, in South Orange, New Jersey. He lived at 1053 Iroquois Avenue, Detroit, Michigan, until he died December 16, 1919.

Rogers and MacFarlane were responsible for the design of many of the office buildings, banks and factories of Detroit, including the Morgan & Wright Bicycle Tire Company plant (later Uniroyal), the Cadillac Motor Works, the Murphy Power Plant on Congress Street (purchased by Detroit Edison June, 1914), the King's China Store (L. B. King and Company Building), and a large number of the most beautiful homes in Detroit.

== Selected commissions ==
Unless otherwise noted, buildings are in Detroit.

- Lake St. Clair Fishing and Shooting Club (1887) 9900 South Channel Drive, St. Clair River, Harsens Island, MI. Demolished in 1926.
- Banner Cigar Factory (1888) 138 East Congress, Demolished in 1957.
- Michigan Central Railroad Depot (Battle Creek, Michigan) (1888) 44 Mccamly Street North - Since 1991 Clara's on the River restaurant - Listed on the National Register of Historic Places in 1971.
- Samuel L. Smith House (1889) 5035 Woodward Avenue - Listed on the National Register of Historic Places in 1986
- Commercial Block (1889) 2100 Michigan Avenue.
- Residence of John N Bagley (1889) 2921 East Jefferson Avenue.
- Residence of Dr. Robert A. Jamieson (1889) 49 West Willis.
- Residence of Rufus Goodell (1890) 223 East Ferry Avenue.
- Duplex Residence of James C. Kuhn (1892) 494-496 Charlotte.
- Residence of Frank J. Sarmiento (1892) 5456 Cass Avenue. Demolished in 1930.
- Shurly Building (1894) 60 West Adams, Demolished in 1940s.
- Residence of Frederick W. Burke (1894) 666 West Forest.
- Leonard & Carter Building (1895) 26-28 Gratiot Avenue, Demolished in 1966.
- Residence of John R. Long (1895) 3430 East Jefferson Avenue, Demolished.
- Duplex residence of Dr. Theodore A. McGraw (1895) 8162 East Jefferson Avenue, Demolished in 1925.
- Residence of Arthur McGraw (1895) 8353 East Jefferson Avenue, Demolished.
- Residence of Martin S. Smith II (1895) 863 Iroquois.
- Palmer Park Casino (1896) Demolished in 1940s.
- Residence of Jane Owen (1896) 8326 East Jefferson Avenue, Demolished.
- Residence of Edward H. Parker. (1896) 8127 East Jefferson Avenue, Demolished.
- Residence of Albert H. Finn (1897) 660 Virginia Park.
- Iroquois Hotel (1897) 443 West Portage Avenue, Sault Ste. Marie, MI. Demolished.
- Residence of William P. Harris (1898) 8335 East Jefferson Avenue.
- Residence of George G. Prentis (1898) 535 East Palmer, Demolished in 1960s.
- Belle Isle Ferry Pavilion (1899) located at the foot of the west side of Woodward Avenue, Demolished in 1930s.
- Residence of Dr. Andrew Biddle (1899) 791 Seminole.
- Residence of Matthew T. Starling (1899) 216 King.
- Reformed of the Sibley Apartments (1900) 2539-2543 Woodward Avenue, Destroyed by fire in 1920.
- Residence of Henry L. Walker (1900) 1005 Iroquois.
- Residence of George Anderson (1900) 275 East Ferry Avenue, Demolished in 1960s.
- Residence of James C. Buckley (1901) 1053 Iroquois.
- Residence of J. Chandler McLauchlan (1901) 1027 Seminole.
- Residence of David C. Whitney "Ridgemont" 237 Lakeshore Drive, Grosse Pointe Farms, MI. Demolished in 1955.
- Residence of J. Hutchins (1902) 90 Atkinson.
- Marquette Building (1905) 243 West Congress.
- Crescent Brass and Pin Company Building (1905) 5766 Trumbull Avenue.
- Residence of Frederick Andrus (1905) 1012 Seminole.
- Morgan & Wright Bicycle Tire Company plant (1905) 6804 East Jefferson (Later Uniroyal) Demolished in 1985.
- Ladder #11 Detroit Fire Department (1906) 1499 East Milwaukee.
- Residence of Edward Hunting Jewett (1906) 1053 Burns.
- Residence of Mrs. Mary E. Holland (1906) 1111 Seminole.
- Residence of James T. Warner (1906) 255 West Grand Boulevard.
- Residence of Lloyd Rowland (1907) 161 Longfellow,
- Residence of Herman Lippold (1908) 110 Virginia Park.
- Residence of Harry M. Jewett "Maplehurst" (1909) 625 Lakeshore, Grosse Pointe Shores, MI.
- L. B. King and Company Building (1910) 1274 Library - Listed on the National Register of Historic Places in 1987
- Warren Motor Car Company Factory (1911) 1331 Holden.
- Residence of James S. Rogers (1911) 779 Seminole.
- Judge Julian Tyler House (1897) 2251 Robinwood - Toledo, Ohio. Old West End neighborhood.

== Photo gallery ==
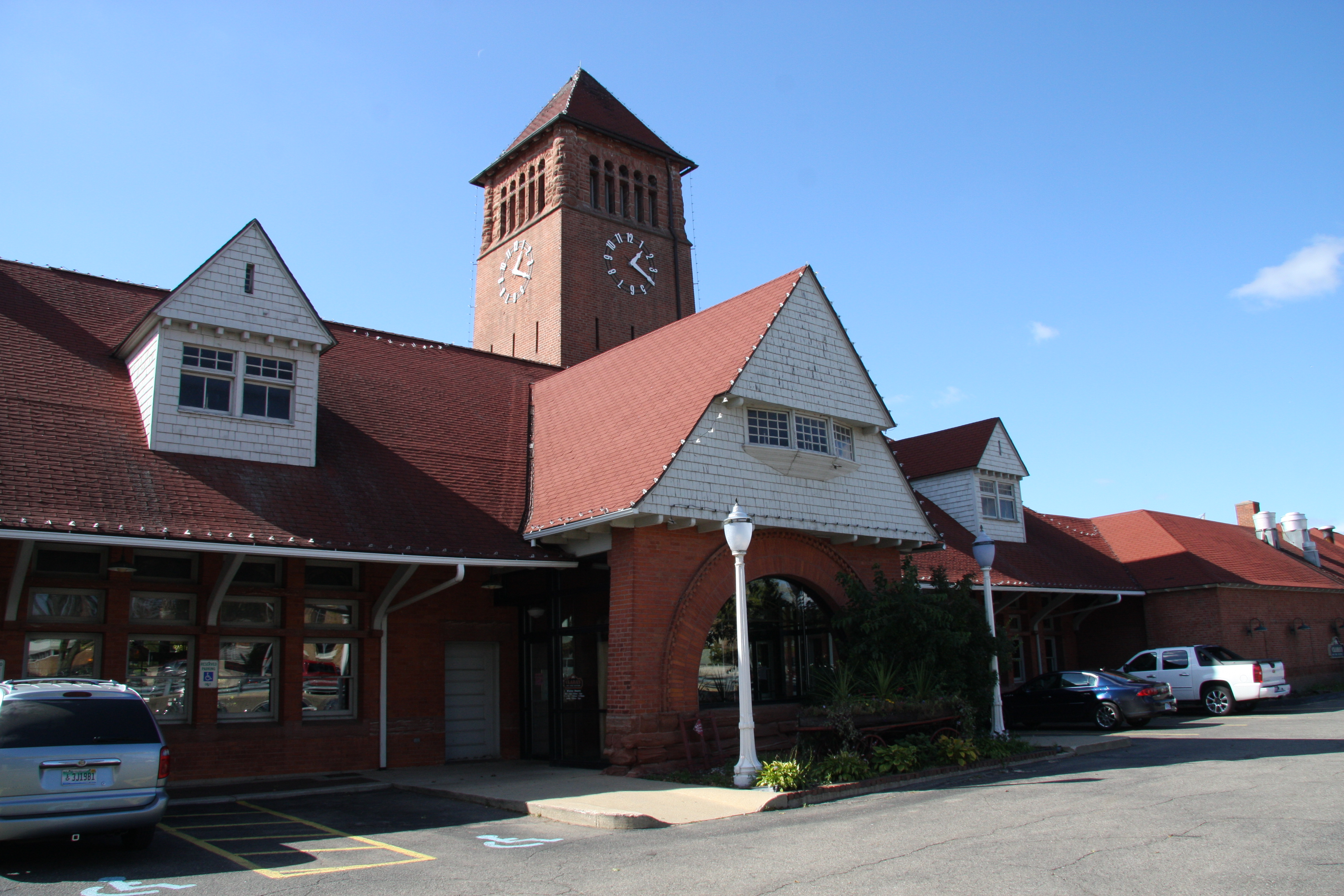
Michigan Central Railroad Depot (Battle Creek, Michigan) Now: Clara's on the River, restaurant. Listed on the National Register of Historic Places in 1971.

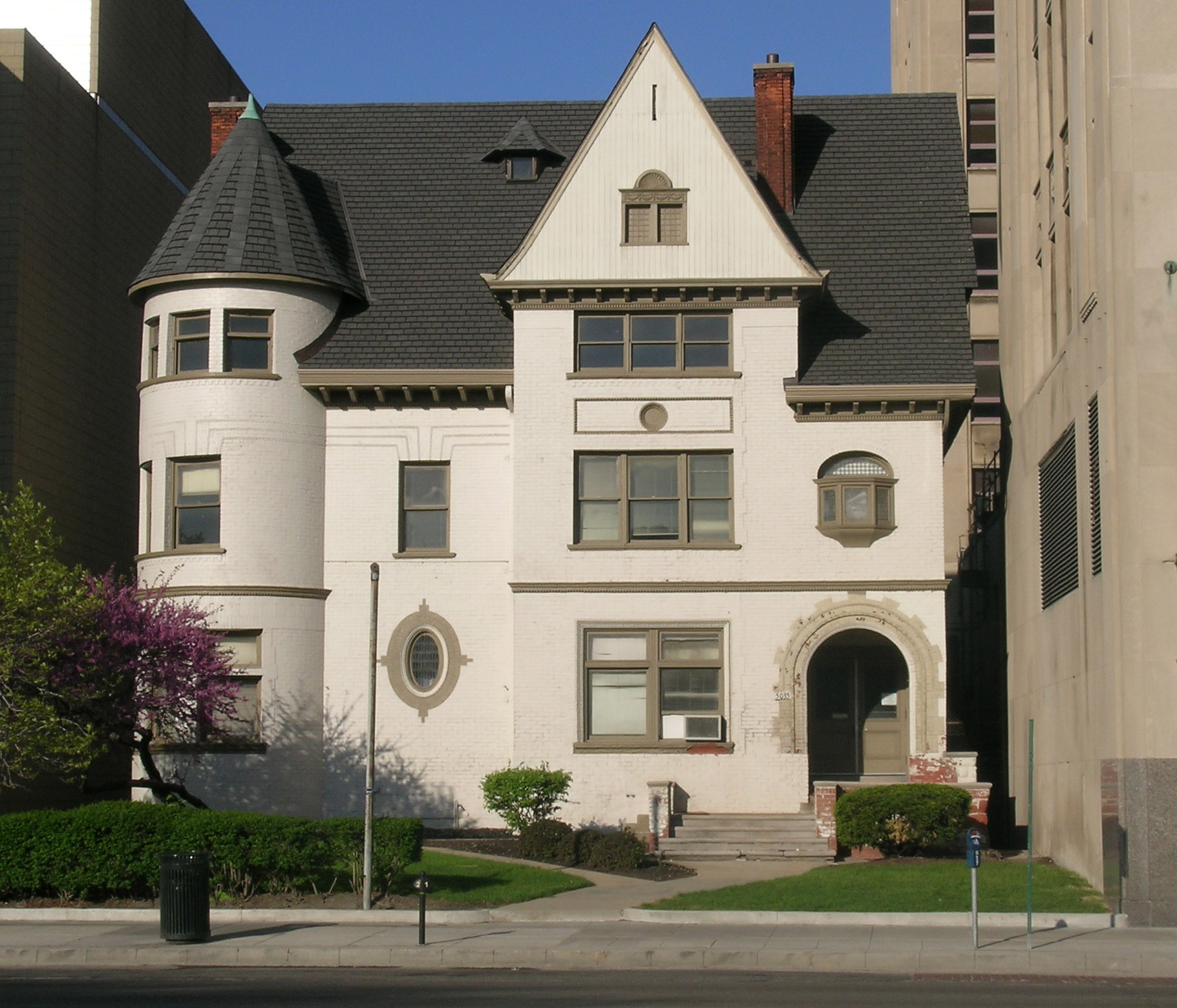
Samuel L. Smith House 5035 Woodward Avenue in Detroit, Michigan. Listed on the National Register of Historic Places in 1986.

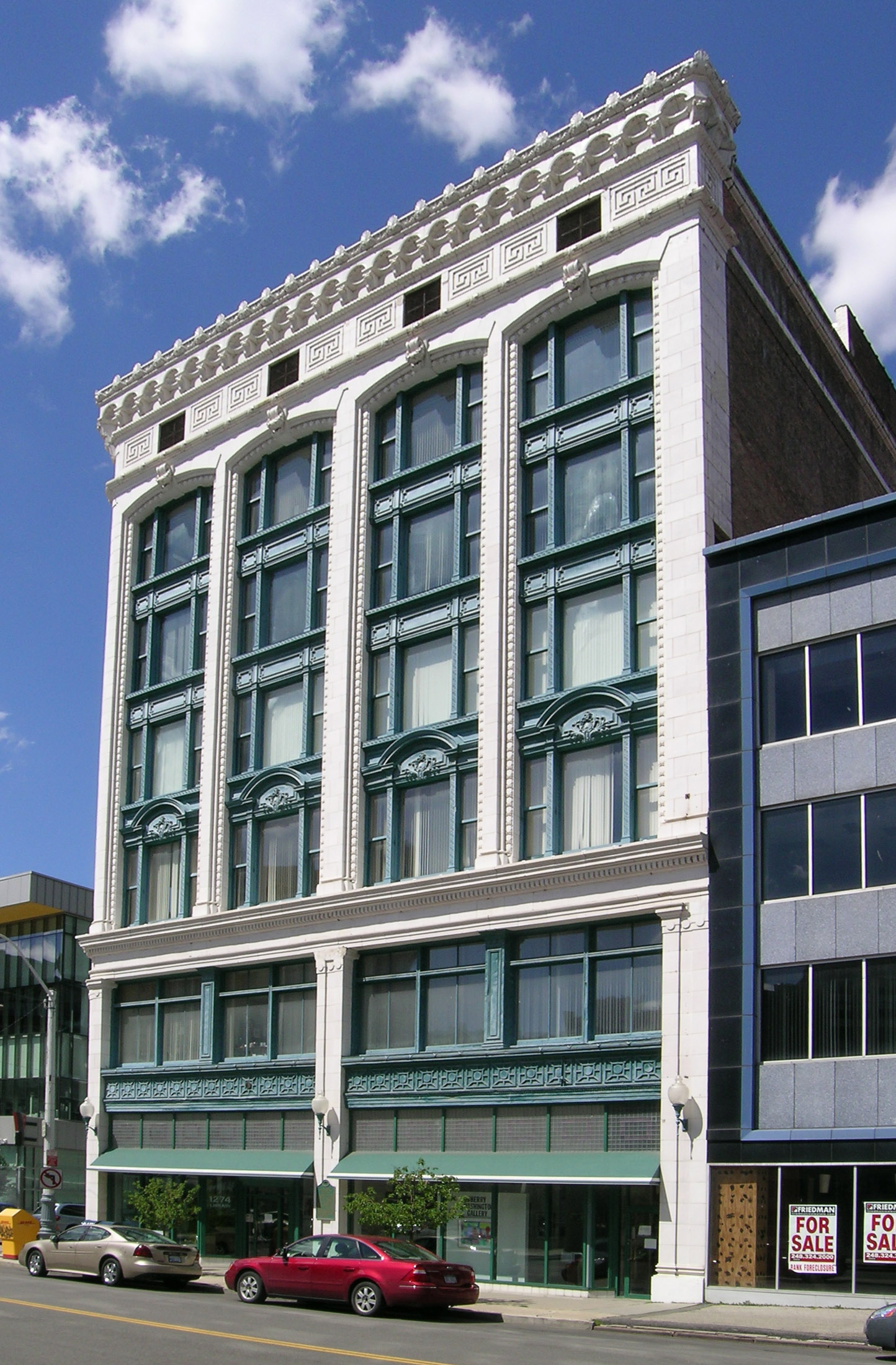
L. B. King and Company Building, Detroit, Michigan. Listed on the National Register of Historic Places in 1987.

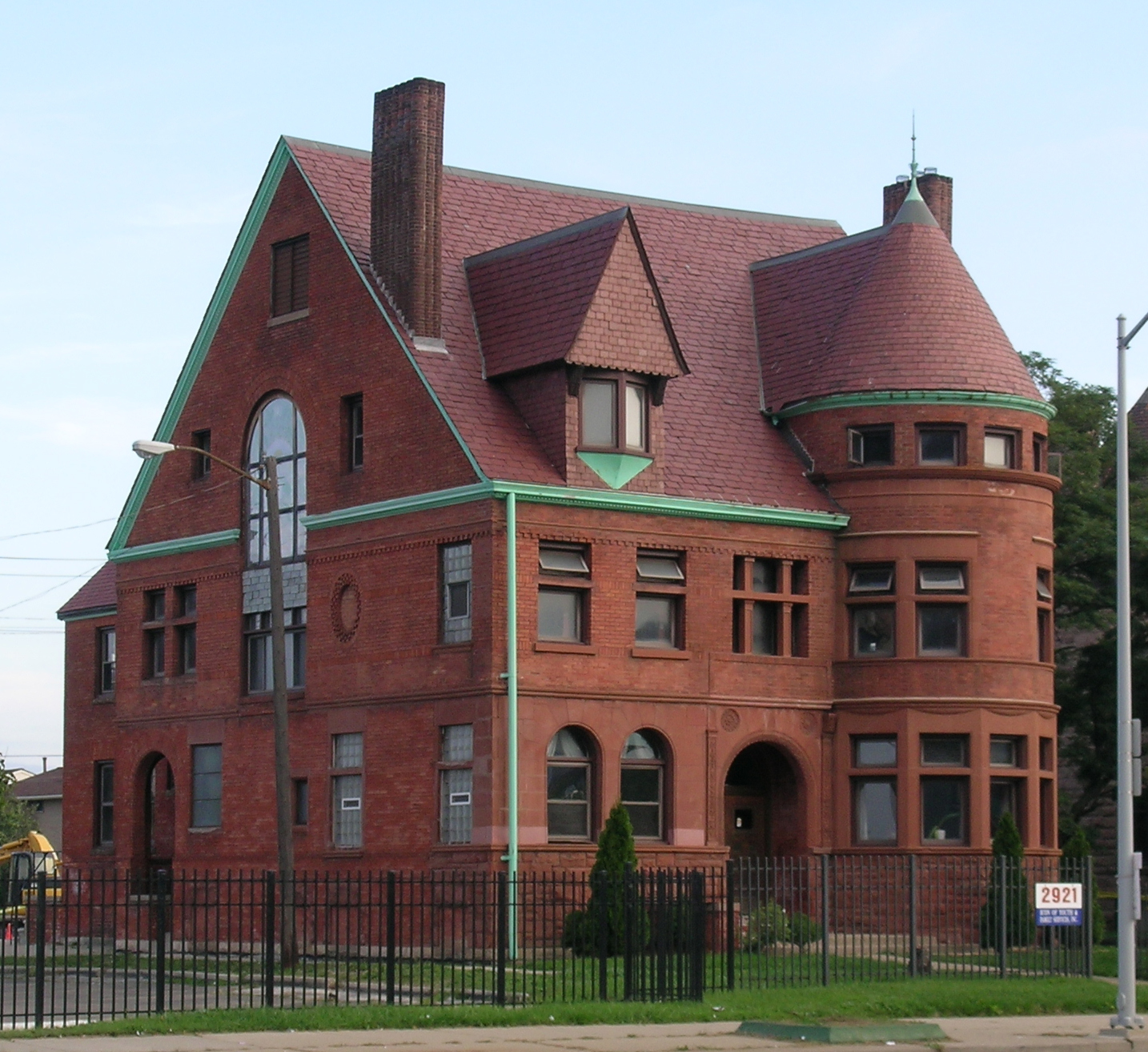
Residence of John N Bagley in E Jefferson Avenue

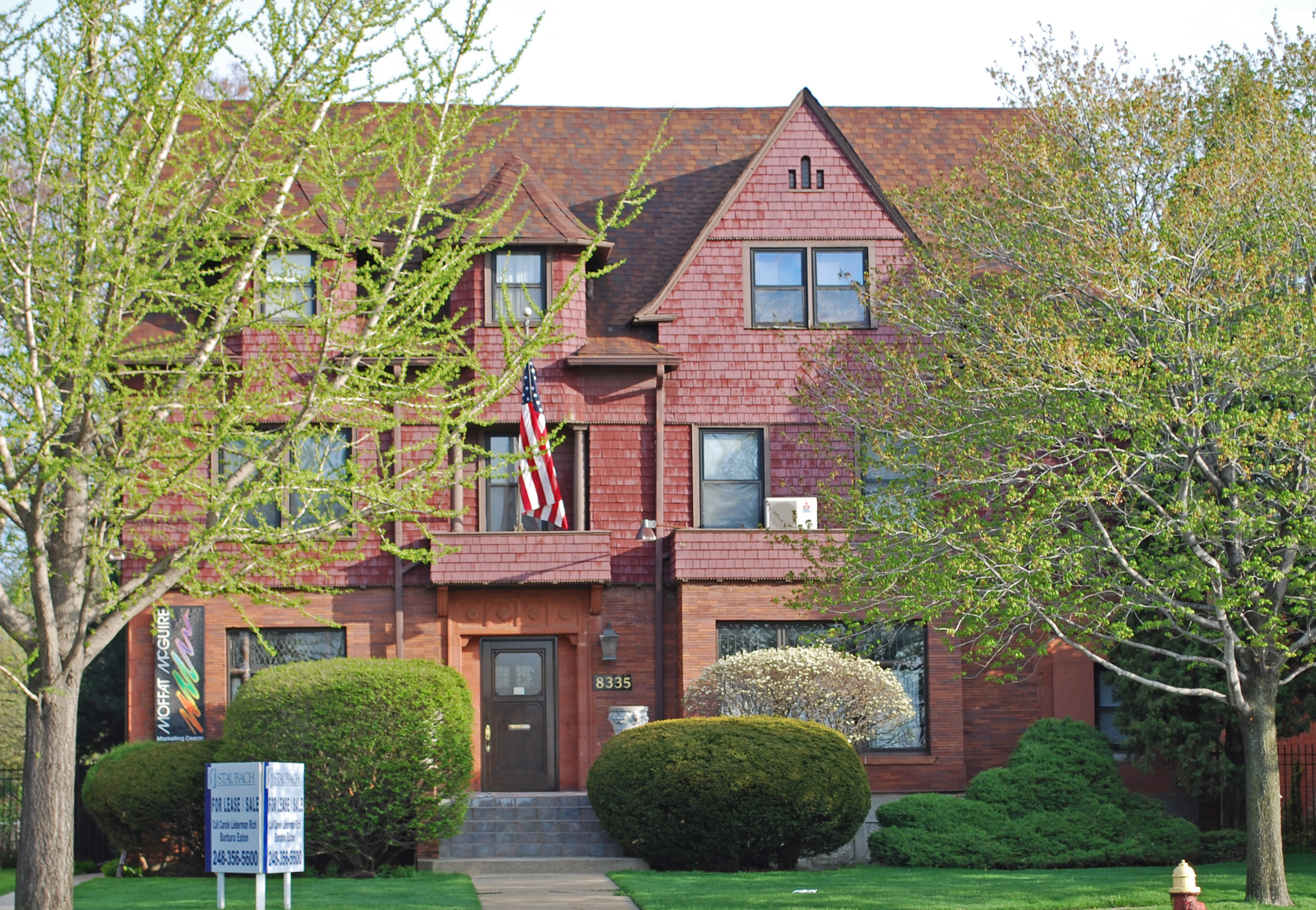
Residence of William F Harris in E Jefferson Avenue

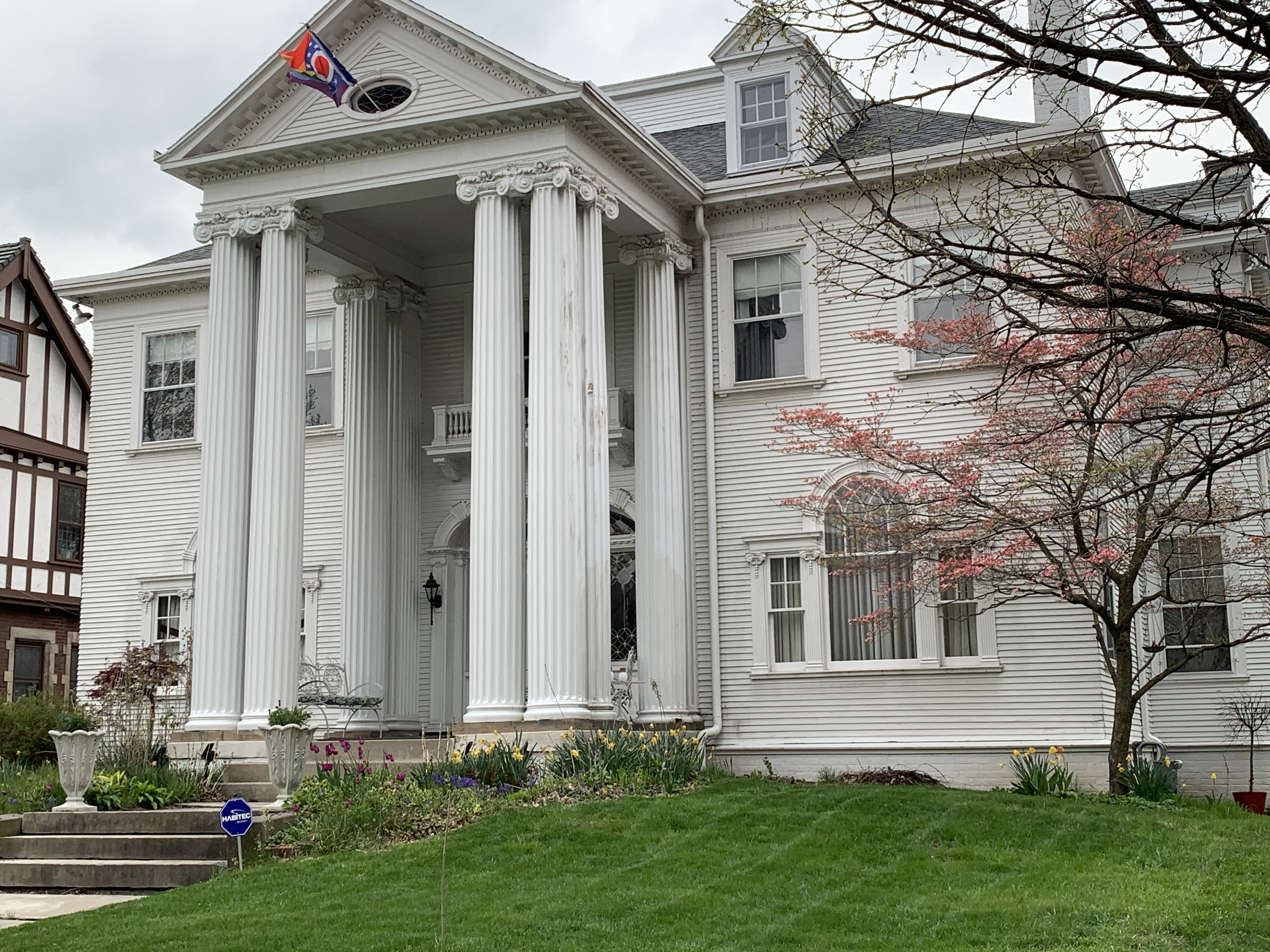
Judge Julian and Lily Heller Tyler house, Old West End, Toledo, Ohio
