= Amboy, Lansing and Traverse Bay Railroad =

Defunct railroad in Michigan, U.S.

Map

The Amboy, Lansing and Traverse Bay Railroad is a defunct railroad which operated in the state of Michigan during the 1850s and 1860s. Initially planned as an ambitious land grant railroad which would run the length of the Lower Peninsula of Michigan, poor finances and politically motivated routes frustrated these aims.

== History ==
The AL&TB was one of several railroads chartered in the 1850s to take advantage of a land grant program instituted by the federal government. Under an act of 1856 and successive acts Michigan had in its gift over 5,000,000 acres (20,000 km^{2}) of land which could be given to railroads (which would then re-sell these lands for a profit) in exchange for constructing certain routes. At the heart of Michigan's network at the time were the Michigan Central Railroad and the Lake Shore and Michigan Southern Railway, both of which ran east–west across the southern Lower Peninsula. As proposed, the route would run from "Amboy by Hillsdale and Lansing, and from Grand Rapids to some point on or near Traverse Bay." This route would bisect the existing railroad network and provide a railroad connection to Lansing, the new state capital.

Almost immediately local interests intervened: the cities of Owosso and Saginaw, which sit northeast of Lansing, successfully lobbied to change the route to run through their cities, then northwest to Traverse Bay. This was a pronounced change from the initial plan, in which the line ran in a straight line northwest from Lansing. The new route's odd shape prompted a Lansing newspaper to dub it the "Ram's Horn Railroad." That epithet had been applied earlier in the decade by Iowa newspaperman James Morgan to a proposed road from Dubuque to Keokuk, whose route was also determined by political considerations and ultimately was not built.

The company began by building a 28-mile (45 km) line from Lansing to Owosso, which it completed in November 1862.

The railroad was sold in 1866 to the Jackson, Lansing and Saginaw Railroad Company, which in turn became part of the Michigan Central Railroad.
