= Michigan Central Railroad Depot =

The Michigan Central Railroad Depot may refer to the following former and active train stations previously used by the Michigan Central Railroad, some listed on the U.S. National Register of Historic Places:

- Michigan Central Railroad Albion Depot
- Michigan Central Railroad Depot (Ann Arbor, Michigan), listed on the NRHP in Michigan, (now a restaurant near the current Ann Arbor (Amtrak station)
- Michigan Central Railroad Battle Creek Depot (a.k.a. Penn Central Railway Station, now a restaurant)
- Michigan Central Railroad Charlotte Depot, listed on the NRHP in Michigan
- Michigan Central Railroad Chelsea Depot, Chelsea, MI, listed on the NRHP in Michigan
- Michigan Central Railroad Columbiaville Depot
- Michigan Central Station (Detroit, Michigan)
- Michigan Central Railroad Dowagiac Depot, listed on the NRHP in Michigan
- Michigan Central Railroad Hastings Depot
- Michigan Central Railroad Indian River Depot
- Michigan Central Railroad Jackson Depot, listed on the NRHP in Michigan
- Michigan Central Depot (Kalamazoo, Michigan)
- Michigan Central Railroad Lansing Depot (now a restaurant)
- Michigan Central Railroad Lapeer Depot (now an insurance agency office)
- Michigan Central Railroad Mason Depot, Mason, MI, listed on the NRHP in Michigan
- Michigan Central Railroad Nashville Depot (now a VFW Post)
- Michigan Central Railroad Niles Depot
- Michigan Central Railroad Standish Depot, Standish, MI, listed on the NRHP in Michigan
- Michigan Central Railroad Thomas Depot (now a private residence)
- Michigan Central Railroad Three Oaks Depot
- Windsor Michigan Central Railroad Depot, burned to the ground in 1996
