= Detroit Rose Street station =

Former Amtrak rail station in Michigan, US

Detroit, MI
- Lake Cities at the temporary Detroit station, Michigan Central Station sits abandoned on the right

General information
- Location: 2601 Rose Street, Detroit, Michigan
- Coordinates: 42°19′47.63″N 83°4′45.74″W
- Owner: Amtrak

History
- Opened: January 5, 1988
- Closed: May 3, 1994

Former services
| Preceding station | Amtrak | Following station |
|---|---|---|
| Dearborn toward Chicago | Wolverine | Terminus |
| Dearborn toward Chicago | Twilight Limited | Terminus |
| Dearborn toward Chicago | Lake Cities | Toledo Terminus |
Location

Detroit was an Amtrak intercity rail station located west of downtown Detroit, Michigan. The facility on Rose Street opened in 1988 as a temporary replacement of the adjacent Michigan Central Station. In 1994 the station was closed and service moved to a new station in Detroit's New Center, currently used by Amtrak.

== History ==
Lakes Cities arriving at Detroit station in February 1990

When Amtrak relinquished Penn Central from operating their twice-daily Chicago–Detroit services on May 1, 1971, all trains terminated at Michigan Central Station. In the following years Amtrak improved frequency and equipment, the Niagara Rainbow was inaugurated to New York City via Canada in 1974, and in 1975 the Penn Central's weekday Ann Arbor–Detroit commuter train was transferred to Amtrak and extended west to Jackson.

After Penn Central's bankruptcy in 1976 most of the railroad's assets, including Michigan Central station, were transferred to Conrail. Amtrak's prosperity began to wane, in 1979 the Niagara Rainbow was discontinued and in 1984 the Michigan Executive commuter train was eliminated. The reduction in service left only the three daily Chicago–Detroit corridor trains, one of which was extended to Toledo, Ohio in 1980. In October 1987 Conrail vacated the facility, leaving Amtrak as the sole tenant.

Not requiring such a substantial facility for their operation, Amtrak began to pursue other options for a Detroit station. Amtrak agreed to contribute $900,000 toward a three track terminal built as part of a new parking garage at Joe Louis Arena. This station, coincidentally located at the same site as the first Michigan Central depot, would have been approximately 1.25 miles (2.01 km) closer to downtown with direct access to the Detroit People Mover. Despite the station box being built into the garage, the plan never came to fruition.

Amtrak threatened to truncate service 6.3 miles (10.1 km) west in suburban Dearborn, which had seen a modern facility constructed a decade prior and was handling more passengers than Detroit. The state stepped in and provided a $460,000 grant for construction of new terminal adjacent to Michigan Central on Rose Street as a stopgap solution. Trains moved to the new station on January 5, 1988.

The facility was closed after the last train left on May 3, 1994. The next day trains began using a new Detroit station at Woodward Avenue constructed by the Michigan Department of Transportation in the New Center neighborhood. Also designed to be temporary until a intermodal passenger transport facility was built on the opposite side of the tracks, it is the current Amtrak station in Detroit. The new station allowed for thru service to Pontiac, extended simultaneously.

== See also ==
- Cincinnati River Road station
