= Illinois High-Speed Rail =

Planned set of rail lines

Illinois High Speed Rail refers to a set of planned high speed rail lines connecting Chicago Union Station (aka the Chicago Hub Network) to various parts of the state and beyond. Two lines already offer increased speeds.

The Michigan Line, which hosts the Blue Water and Wolverine services, has a long section in Indiana and Michigan owned by Amtrak. Since Amtrak has priority on this track (and another section in Michigan) and converted it to using positive train control, they have increased speeds over those sections to 110 miles per hour (180 km/h).

The Lincoln Service between Chicago and St. Louis has been upgraded and has trains running at 90 miles per hour (140 km/h) (faster than the prior 79 miles per hour [127 km/h] limit). Service at speeds of 110 mph and higher was slated to begin in 2019. On 3 May 2023, officials with Amtrak and the Illinois Department of Transportation have cleared the railroad company to set new maximum speeds for their trains through select corridors in Illinois, with some trains reaching speeds of 110 miles per hour.

There has also been some talk of service from Chicago O'Hare International Airport to Rockford railway station. Studies began in 2015 to look into the construction and contracting on the project.

In 2022, Amtrak received $3,000,000 in federal funds to support the final design of improvements to the concourse level of Chicago Union Station. Amtrak, Illinois Department of Transportation, Metra, Chicago Department of Transportation, and Cook County will provide a 50% match. The same year, Amtrak submitted an application for $251 million in federal funding aimed at supporting several goals considered necessary by advocates for high-speed rail in the Midwest. The Chicago DOT, Cook County, Illinois DOT, Michigan DOT and Metra are funding partners in the program.

== Illinois High Speed Rail Commission ==
In August 2021, Illinois Governor JB Pritzker signed into law the Illinois High Speed Rail Commission Act (20 ILCS 4102), establishing the Illinois High Speed Rail Commission. The Commission's main goals are to establish a plan to create a high-speed rail line between Chicago and St. Louis (separate from the Lincoln Service) with feeder lines to Rockford, Moline, Peoria, and Decatur (cities with no current Amtrak service). The Illinois Department of Transportation (IDOT) provides the Commission with administrative and technical support. Routes options would consist of entirely new corridors using either interstate median or greenfield options.

The inaugural meeting occurred in April 2023 and is held virtually and in-person at IDOT's offices in Springfield and downtown Chicago. Metra executive director Jim Derwinski serves as chair of the Commission. The Commission submits annual reports to the Governor and the Illinois General Assembly on December 31 of each calendar year. The 2025 annual report outlines eight feasible routes:

- Route 1: East St. Louis – Springfield – Bloomington/Normal – Joliet – Chicago Interstate Route
- Route 2: East St. Louis – Springfield – Bloomington/Normal – Joliet – Chicago Greenfield Route
- Route 3: East St. Louis -– Springfield – Champaign/Urbana – University Park – Chicago Interstate Route
- Route 4: East St. Louis – Springfield – Decatur – Champaign/Urbana – University Park – Chicago Greenfield Route
- Route 5: East St. Louis – Springfield – Decatur – Champaign/Urbana – Joliet – Chicago Greenfield Route
- Route 6: East St. Louis – Springfield – Decatur – Champaign/Urbana – Joliet – Chicago Interstate Adjacent and County Road Route
- Route 7: East St. Louis – Springfield – Peoria – Bloomington/Normal – Joliet – Chicago Interstate Route
- Route 8: East St. Louis – Springfield – Peoria – Bloomington/Normal – Joliet – Chicago Greenfield Route

The Commission was originally scheduled to be dissolved on January 1, 2027. In July 2026, Illinois Governor JB Pritzker signed an amendment to the High-Speed Railway Commission Act that extended its repeal date to January 1, 2030.
