= Jackson station (Michigan) =

Railroad station opened in 1841

Jackson, MI
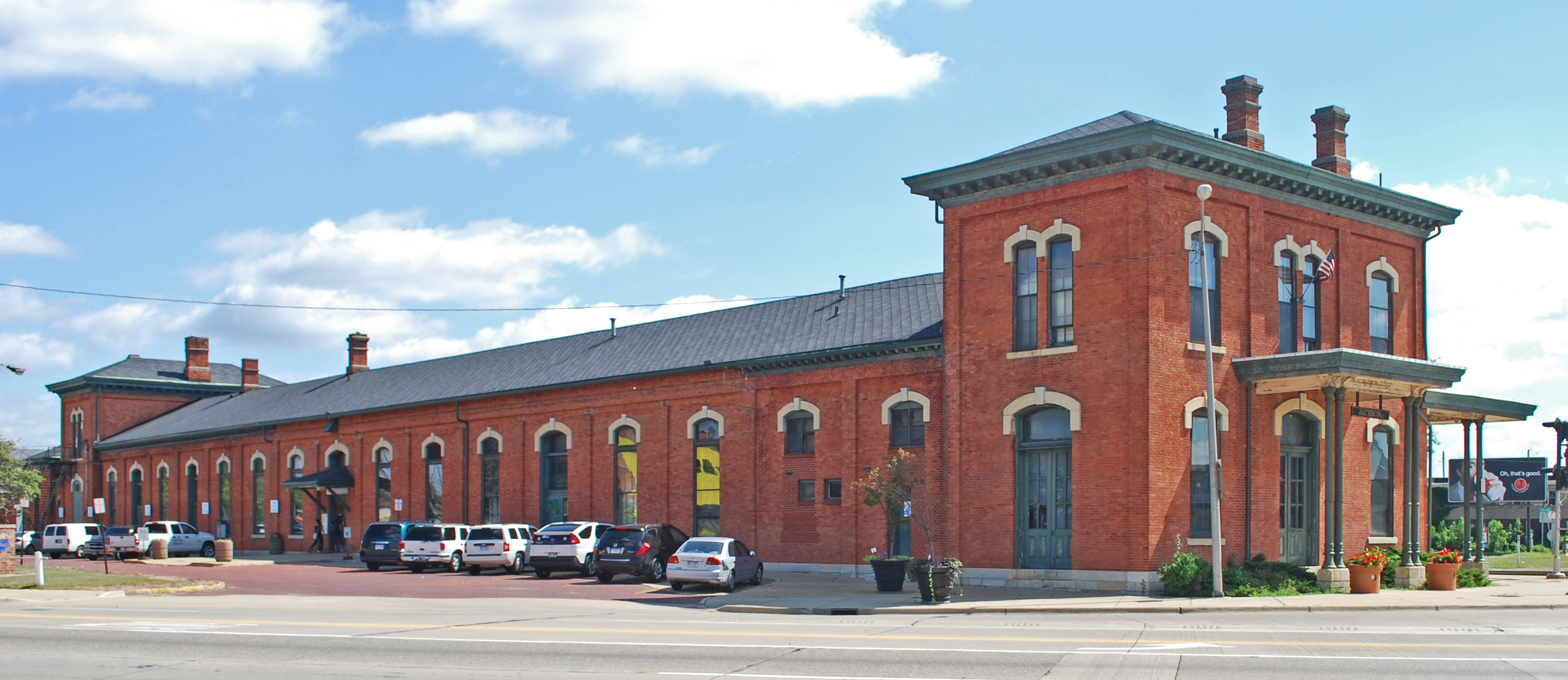
- The station building in 2010

General information
- Location: 501 East Michigan Avenue; Jackson, Michigan; United States
- Coordinates: 42°14′53″N 84°24′01″W
- Owner: Amtrak
- Line: MDOT Michigan Line
- Platforms: 1 side platform, 1 island platform
- Tracks: 2
- Connections: Amtrak Thruway; Jackson Area Transportation Authority: 1, 4

Construction
- Parking: Yes
- Accessible: Yes
- Architect: Henry A. Gardner
- Architectural style: Italianate

Other information
- Station code: Amtrak: JXN

History
- Opened: 1841
- Rebuilt: 1872 & 1978

Passengers
- FY 2025: 18,371 (Amtrak)

Services
Preceding station	Amtrak	Following station
Albion toward Chicago	Wolverine	Ann Arbor toward Pontiac
Former services
Preceding station	Amtrak	Following station
Albion toward Chicago	Lake Cities 1980–2004	Ann Arbor toward Pontiac
Terminus	Michigan Executive	Chelsea toward Detroit (Michigan Central)
Preceding station	New York Central Railroad	Following station
Parma toward Chicago	Michigan Central Railroad Main Line	Grass Lake toward Buffalo
Horton toward Fort Wayne	Fort Wayne Branch	Terminus
Haires toward Niles	Michigan Air Line Railroad	Terminus
Rives Junction toward Grand Rapids	MCR Grand Rapids Branch	Terminus
Terminus	Jackson Branch	Napoleon toward Toledo
Terminus	Cincinnati Northern Railroad	Lyonette toward Franklin
Terminus	Bay City Branch	Rives Junction toward Bay City

U.S. National Register of Historic Places
- Official name: Michigan Central Railroad Jackson Depot
- Designated: December 12, 2002
- Reference no.: 02001504
Location

Jackson station is a historic Amtrak station in Jackson, Michigan, United States. It is served by three daily Wolverine trains between Chicago and Pontiac and a single daily Amtrak Thruway bus between Toledo, Detroit, Jackson, and East Lansing. The station was added to the National Register of Historic Places in 2002.

== History ==
What eventually became the Michigan Central Railroad was begun in 1837, and the track reached Jackson by 1841. By the 1870s, multiple other lines served the city including the Jackson, Lansing and Saginaw Railroad, the Fort Wayne, Jackson and Saginaw Railroad, the Grand River Railway, and the Michigan Air Line Railroad. In 1872, the Michigan Central Railroad decided to construct a replacement for its earlier station built in 1841. The new station, named 'Jackson Union Station,' was used as a Union Station, serving all the other lines (namely, the Cincinnati Northern Railroad (1894–1938)) through Jackson except the Lake Shore and Michigan Southern Railway, which was then a major competitor with the Michigan Central, and the Grand Trunk Railway. Construction began in late 1872, and finished in the summer of 1873.

Passenger service into Jackson remained high until the coming of the automobile. New York Central service along the Chicago-Detroit-Buffalo-New York New York Special and the Wolverine (operating on the same route) made stops at Jackson. Other routes were the Chicago-Toronto Canadian; the Chicago-Detroit Chicago Mercury; a Grand Rapids-Jackson train; and a Jackson-Lansing-Saginaw-Bay City train. Service to Bay City and Saginaw ended in 1959, and service to Toronto ended in 1961. In 1964, when I-94 was completed, ridership dropped dramatically. In 1971, Amtrak took over the Detroit-Chicago passenger service through Jackson, which remains the only current service in the station.

In 1978, the station underwent a refurbishing inspired by the nation's Bicentennial celebrations. Workers cleaned the brick exterior, reground the terazzo floors and refinished the elaborate wood trim and benches. Artist Leland Beamon created a mural showing the depot in 1904 alongside a modern Turboliner Amtrak train. Also in 1978, a former disgruntled New York Central employee named Rudy Bladel killed three former coworkers at the station. The murder trial led to a U.S. Supreme Court case, Michigan v. Jackson, on the admissibility of confessions. Additional improvements were made in 2008, 2013, and 2018.

== Description ==
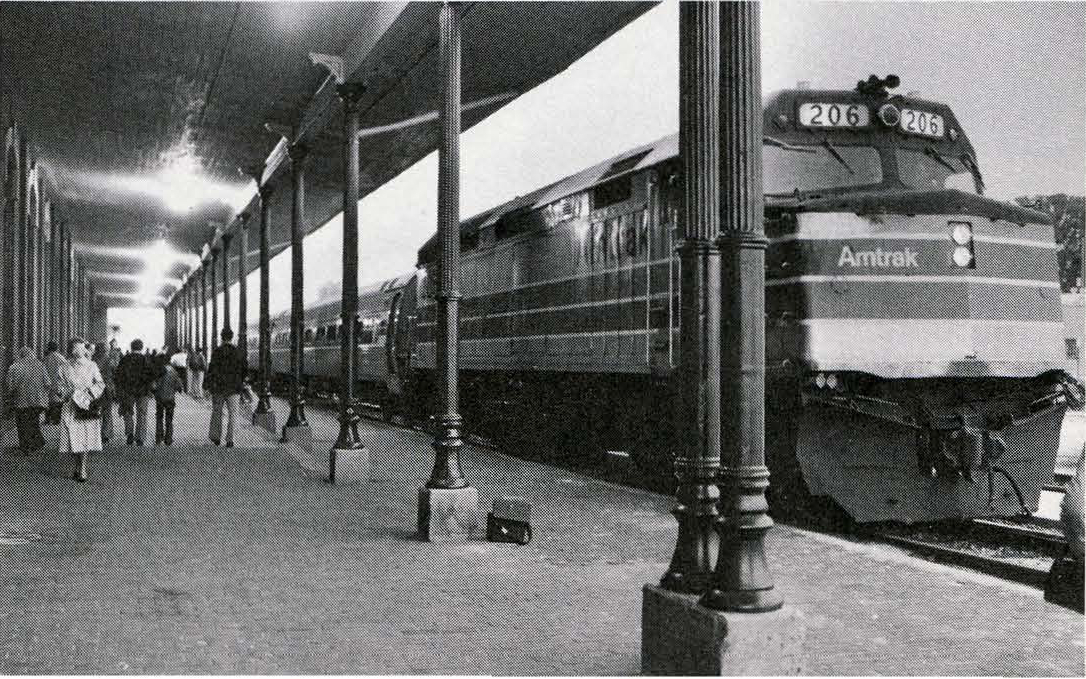
Amtrak's Michigan Executive at Jackson, October 1978

The Jackson Station consists of two buildings: the depot proper and nearby Express Building. The depot is a single story red brick Italianate structure, measuring about 325 feet in length and 44 feet in width. The building has two-story blocks measuring 23 feet by 45 feet extending from the roof at either end. The building sits on a foundation of light brownish sandstone with a whitish sandstone sillcourse running on top. The long walls are divided into sixteen bays by projecting brick piers; each bay contains a single window or door. The windows are narrow, tall six-over-six sash units with a three-light transom above, placed in an arched head opening with a five-piece segmental sandstone lintel above and a sandstone sill below. The building's ends each contain a double doorway and a coupled window on the second story above. The flanking sections of the two-story blocks contain single second-floor windows.

The building has a gable roof on the main section, with hipped roofs on the two-story blocks; the roofs are covered with modern asphalt shingles. The eaves have sheet metal cornices. On the track side, a wooden canopy runs along most of the building. The canopy is supported by cast iron columns.

The Express Building is a single-story L-shaped, brick building with a hip roof. It measures approximately 98 feet by 82 feet along the longest sides. It sits on a light brownish sandstone foundation. The elevations are divided into bays by brick piers, with each bay containing a freight door or window.
