= Albion station (Michigan) =

Railway station in Albion, Michigan

Albion, MI
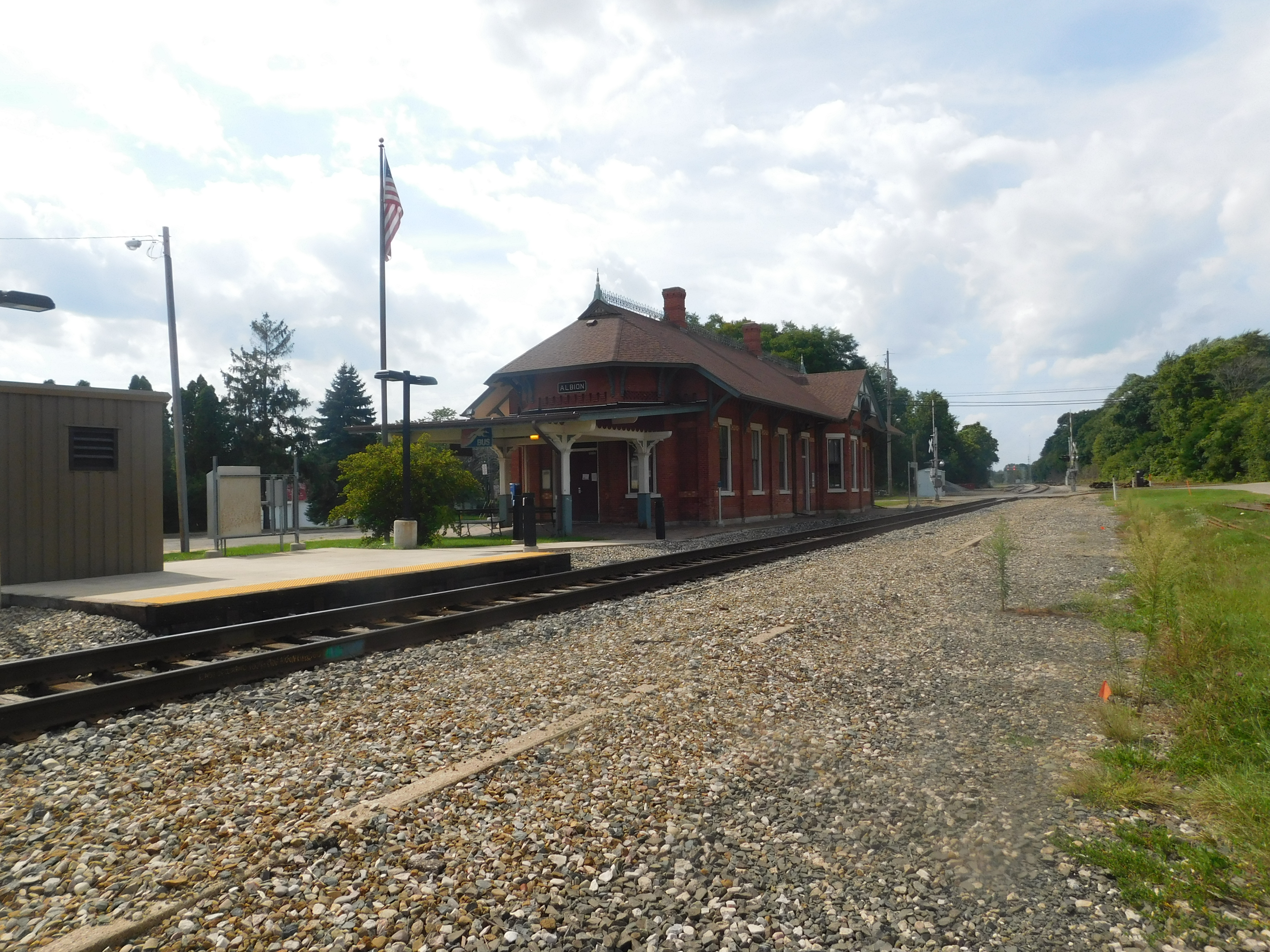
- The Albion station in September 2016

General information
- Location: 300 North Eaton Street; Albion, Michigan; United States
- Coordinates: 42°14′50″N 84°45′22″W
- Owner: Amtrak
- Line: MDOT Michigan Line
- Platforms: 1 side platform
- Tracks: 1
- Connections: Greyhound Lines

Construction
- Parking: Yes
- Accessible: Yes

Other information
- Station code: Amtrak: ALI

History
- Opened: 1882

Passengers
- FY 2025: 2,668 (Amtrak)

Services
Preceding station	Amtrak	Following station
Battle Creek toward Chicago	Wolverine	Jackson toward Pontiac
Former services
Preceding station	Amtrak	Following station
Battle Creek toward Chicago	Lake Cities 1980–2004	Jackson toward Pontiac
Preceding station	New York Central Railroad	Following station
Marengo toward Chicago	Michigan Central Railroad Main Line	Parma toward Buffalo
Homer toward Jonesville	Lansing Branch	Devereux toward Lansing
Location

Albion station is a train station in Albion, Michigan, served by Amtrak's Wolverine line. Amtrak does not provide ticketing or baggage service at this station, which is served by two trains daily.

== History ==
The current Albion station house was built in 1882 by the Michigan Central Railroad, which originally ran through town in 1844. The station also had a freight house. Ten years earlier Albion had competition when the Lake Shore and Michigan Southern Railway arrived and added its own station, which operated until the 1920s.

The red brick depot is a well-preserved example of a Victorian station with earlier Italianate details, such as three sided bays with fancy double brackets supporting the eaves. Colored and glazed brick in shades of white form two beltcourses that encircle the structure. Plain pilasters divide the window bays, each of which features deep corbelling. The trackside bay is topped by a gable with bargeboard and woodwork associated with the Eastlake decorative style. Wrought-iron fencing is found along the ridge of the roof, while two prominent chimneys with corbelling crown the structure.

The Albion station was abandoned in 1971, when Amtrak consolidated all cross-country passenger rail service within the United States. However it was restored to its original condition by local community groups in the mid-1980s and currently serves as both a bus and train station. The freight house was also restored and converted into a local sports bar known as Davan's, which has since closed.
