= Kalamazoo Transportation Center =

Train and bus station in Kalamazoo, Michigan, USA

Kalamazoo, MI
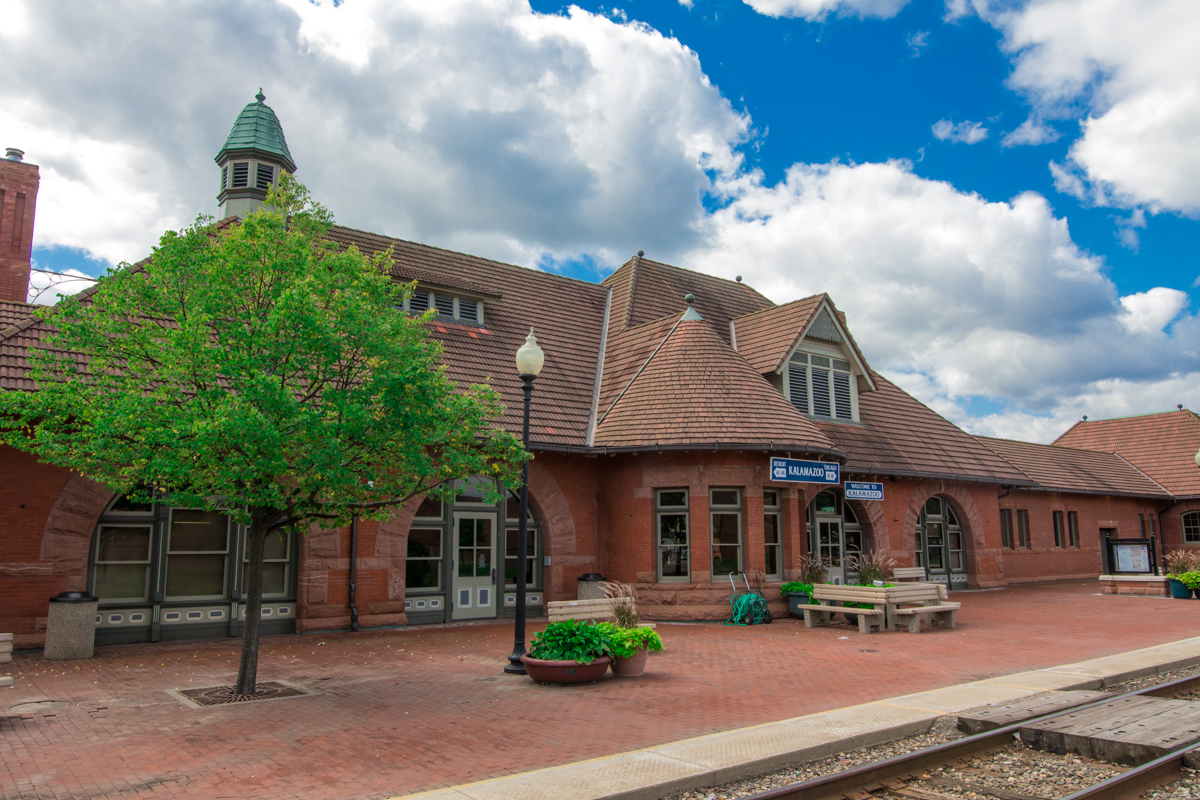
- The 1887-built Michigan Central Railroad depot in 2014

General information
- Location: 459 North Burdick Street; Kalamazoo, Michigan; United States
- Coordinates: 42°17′44″N 85°35′03″W
- Owner: City of Kalamazoo
- Line: Amtrak Michigan Line
- Platforms: 1 side platform, 1 island platform
- Tracks: 2
- Bus stands: 20
- Bus operators: Amtrak Thruway; Greyhound Lines; Indian Trails; Metro

Construction
- Parking: Yes; paid
- Accessible: Yes

Other information
- Station code: Amtrak: KAL

History
- Opened: 1887
- Rebuilt: 2006

Passengers
- FY 2025: 84,043 (Amtrak)

Services
Preceding station	Amtrak	Following station
Dowagiac toward Chicago	Blue Water	Battle Creek toward Port Huron
Dowagiac toward Chicago	Wolverine	Battle Creek toward Pontiac
Former services
Preceding station	Amtrak	Following station
Niles toward Chicago	Lake Cities	Battle Creek toward Pontiac
Dowagiac toward Chicago	International	Battle Creek toward Toronto
Preceding station	New York Central Railroad	Following station
Mattawan toward Chicago	Michigan Central Railroad Main Line	Comstock toward Buffalo
Portage toward Elkhart	Kalamazoo Branch	Argenta toward Grand Rapids
Alamo toward South Haven	South Haven Branch	Terminus
- Michigan Central Depot (Kalamazoo, Michigan)
- U.S. National Register of Historic Places
- Michigan State Historic Site
- Interactive map of Michigan Central Depot (Kalamazoo, Michigan)
- Location: Kalamazoo, Michigan, USA
- Architect: Cyrus Eidlitz
- Architectural style: Romanesque
- NRHP reference No.: 75000949

Significant dates
- Added to NRHP: July 11, 1975
- Designated MSHS: February 21, 1975
Location

The Kalamazoo Transportation Center is an Intermodal train and bus station in downtown Kalamazoo, Michigan. It is the second-busiest Amtrak station in Michigan, after Ann Arbor. The Kalamazoo Transportation Center serves as the main hub for Kalamazoo Metro local buses, and also serves intercity buses operated by Greyhound and Indian Trails.

The railroad station was built in 1887 by the Michigan Central Railroad, and was listed on the National Register of Historic Places in 1975. An expansion project in 2005 and 2006 renovated the original station building and added a bus station for local and intercity buses.

The station is served by Amtrak's Blue Water and Wolverine trains, as part of Amtrak's Michigan Services brand. The station was formerly served by the International, a Toronto–Chicago service which operated from 1982 to 2004 as a partnership between Via Rail and Amtrak.

== History ==
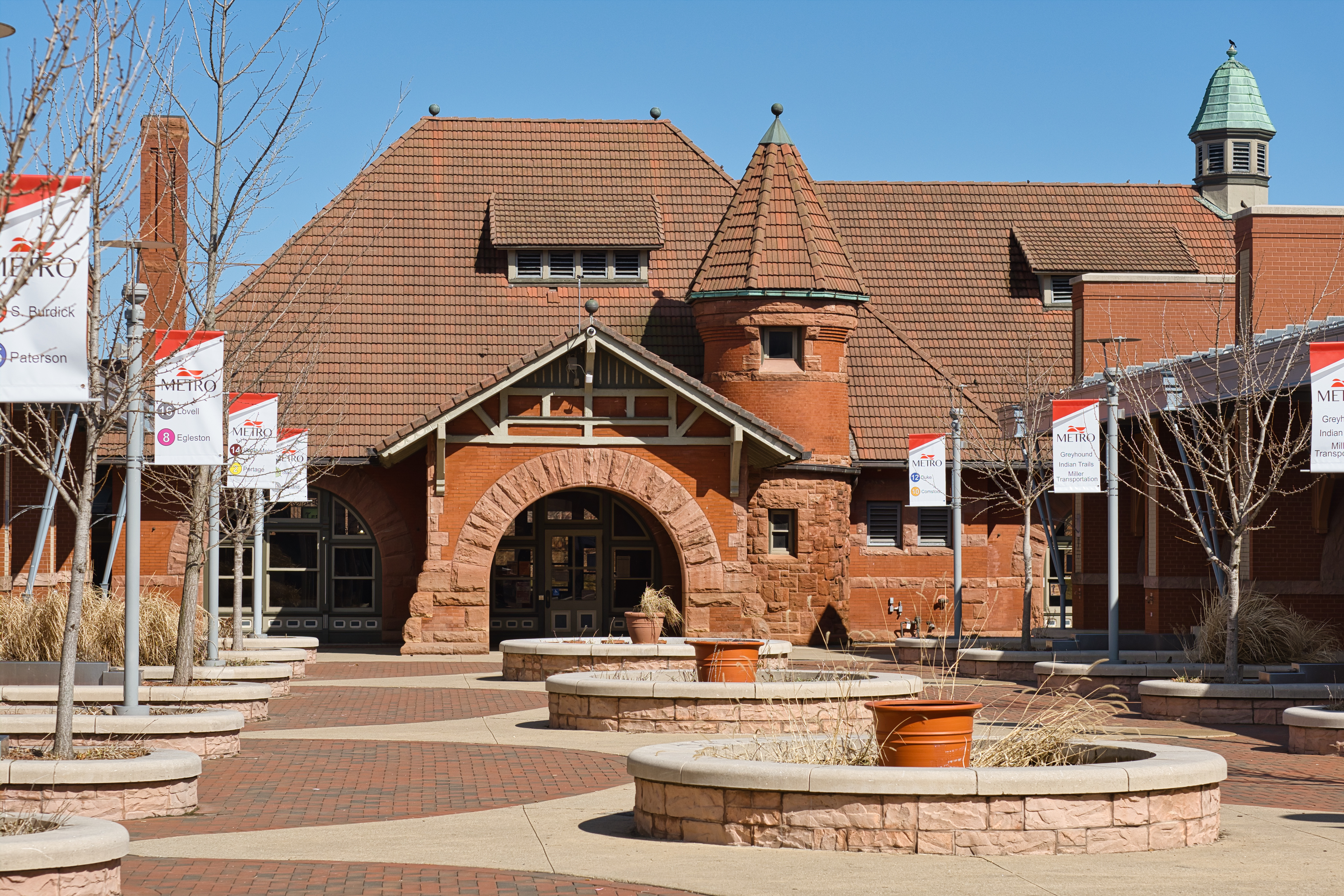
Looking north at the station building; bus bays are to the left and right in the foreground

The original depot was built in 1887 by the Michigan Central Railroad, to a design by architect Cyrus L. W. Eidlitz, replacing an earlier structure. Regular passenger rail service between Kalamazoo and Detroit had commenced in 1846. In the main part of its history in the latter 19th century and early 20th century, the depot hosted trains for the Michigan Central and the New York Central. Major NYC named trains passing through the station included the Canadian (east to Detroit and Toronto), the Chicago Mercury (east to Detroit) and the Wolverine (east to New York via Detroit and southwestern Canada, in contrast to the modern train).

It was added to the National Register of Historic Places on July 11, 1975.

The station was rebuilt as a multi-modal facility in 2005. The project was a collaboration between local, state, and federal authorities, with the Department of Transportation awarding a $3.8 million grant.

== Description ==
The original Kalamazoo depot is a single-story Romanesque structure with a high hip-roofed central mass, and smaller hip-roofed sections on each end. A gable-roofed porch with a Syrian arch protrudes on one side of the central mass. The main structure has strong horizontal lines, counterbalanced by brick chimneys and an octagonal cupola that extend vertically from the roof. A conical turret and rock-faced masonry arches in the facade provide the Romanesque feel. The sandstone details are made from Lake Superior sandstone.
