= Niles station =

Amtrak intercity train station in Niles, Michigan

Niles, MI
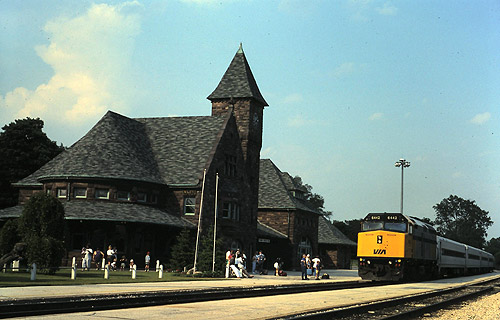
- The westbound International at Niles in 1994

General information
- Location: 598 Dey Street, Niles, Michigan; United States
- Line: Amtrak Michigan Line
- Platforms: 1 side platform, 1 island platform
- Tracks: 2

Construction
- Parking: Yes
- Accessible: yes

Other information
- Station code: Amtrak: NLS

History
- Opened: 1892

Passengers
- FY 2025: 16,259 (Amtrak)

Services
Preceding station	Amtrak	Following station
New Buffalo toward Chicago	Blue Water	Dowagiac toward Port Huron
New Buffalo toward Chicago	Wolverine	Dowagiac toward Pontiac
Former services
Preceding station	Amtrak	Following station
Hammond–Whiting toward Chicago	Lake Cities	Kalamazoo toward Pontiac
Chicago 2001-2004 Terminus	International	Dowagiac toward Toronto
Hammond–Whiting 1982-2001 toward Chicago	International	Dowagiac toward Toronto
Preceding station	New York Central Railroad	Following station
Buchanan toward Chicago	Michigan Central Railroad Main Line	Pokagon toward Buffalo
Terminus	Michigan Air Line Railroad	Cassopolis toward Jackson
Berrien Center toward Benton Harbor	Benton Harbor – South Bend	South Bend Terminus
- Michigan Central Railroad Niles Depot
- U.S. National Register of Historic Places
- Michigan State Historic Site
- Interactive map of Michigan Central Railroad Niles Depot
- Location: Niles, Michigan, USA
- Coordinates: 41°50′14″N 86°15′08″W
- Built: 1892
- Architectural style: Romanesque
- NRHP reference No.: 09000085

Significant dates
- Added to NRHP: September 19, 1979
- Designated MSHS: October 15, 1992
Location

Niles station is an Amtrak intercity train station in Niles, Michigan. The station is served by three daily Wolverine round trips and one daily Blue Water round trip. It is located on the Michigan Line (the former Michigan Central Railroad mainline), east of the former Benton Harbor Branch crossing and west of the former junctions with the South Bend and Air Line Branches. The station building was constructed by the Michigan Central in 1892 to a design by architects Spier and Rohns. It is listed on the National Register of Historic Places as Michigan Central Railroad Niles Depot. The station was upgraded in 1988 and renovated again in 2003.

Niles station was used as a filming location for Continental Divide, Midnight Run, and Only the Lonely, the latter of which spawned an annual tradition of adding Christmas lights and decorations around the station.
