= Dowagiac station =

Railway station in Dowagiac, Michigan, U.S.

Dowagiac, MI
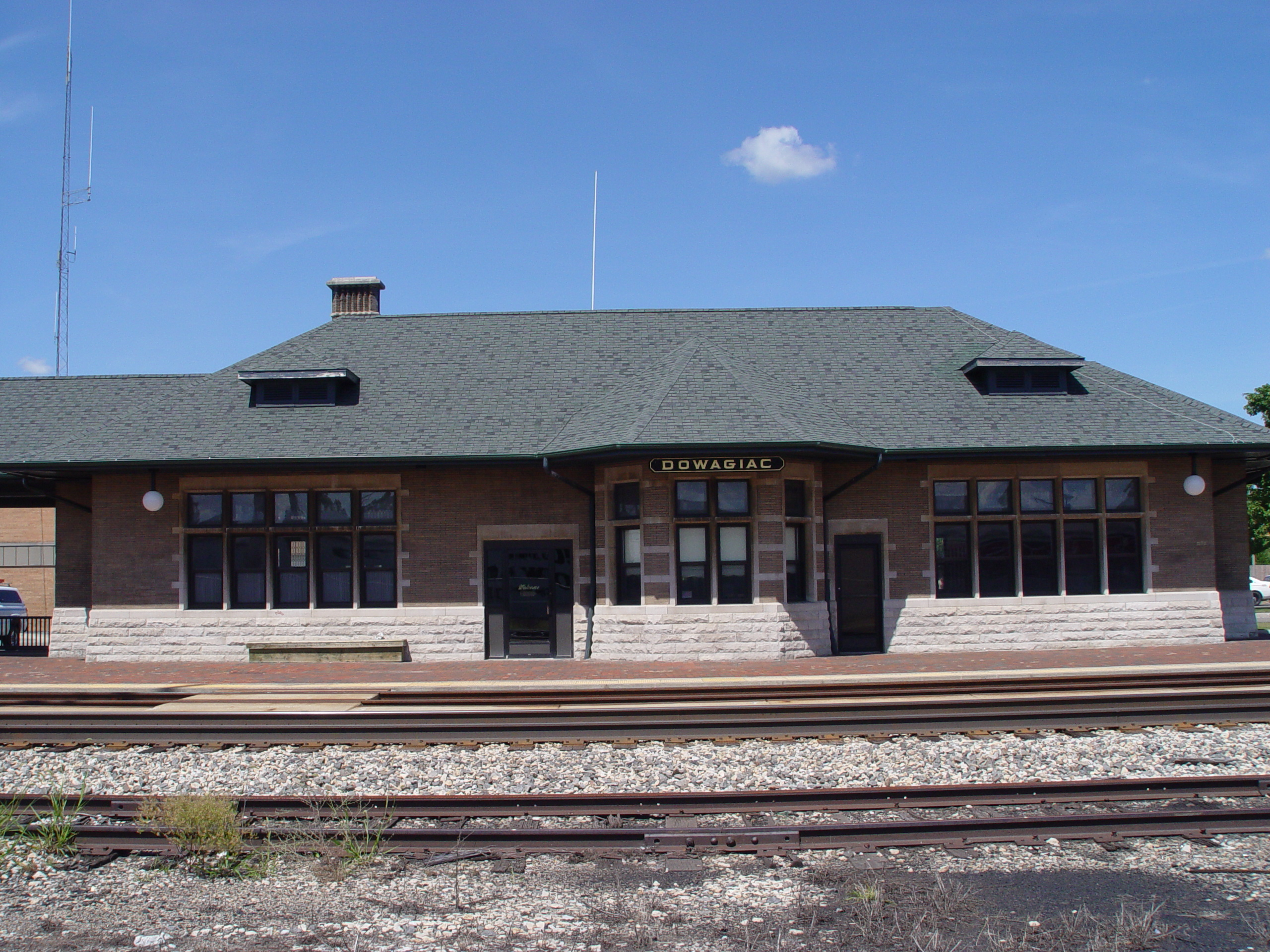
- Trackside view of Dowagiac's historic former Michigan Central Railroad Depot

General information
- Location: 200 Depot Drive; Dowagiac, Michigan; United States
- Coordinates: 41°58′51″N 86°6′32″W
- Line: Amtrak Michigan Line
- Platforms: 1 side platform
- Tracks: 2

Construction
- Parking: Yes; Free
- Accessible: yes

Other information
- Station code: Amtrak: DOA

History
- Opened: 1903

Passengers
- FY 2025: 5,165 (Amtrak)

Services
Preceding station	Amtrak	Following station
Niles toward Chicago	Blue Water	Kalamazoo toward Port Huron
Niles toward Chicago	Wolverine	Kalamazoo toward Pontiac
Former services
Preceding station	Amtrak	Following station
Niles toward Chicago	International	Kalamazoo toward Toronto
Preceding station	New York Central Railroad	Following station
Pokagon toward Chicago	Michigan Central Railroad Main Line	Decatur toward Buffalo
- Michigan Central Railroad Dowagiac Depot
- U.S. National Register of Historic Places
- Michigan State Historic Site
- Interactive map of Michigan Central Railroad Dowagiac Depot
- Location: Dowagiac, Michigan, USA
- Built: 1903
- Built by: M. J. Rogers
- Architect: likely Spier and Rohns
- Architectural style: Tudor Revival
- NRHP reference No.: 93001349
- Added to NRHP: 1993
Location

Dowagiac is a train station in Dowagiac, Michigan, served by Amtrak, the United States' railroad passenger system. The station was built by the Michigan Central Railroad in 1902, and added to the National Register of Historic Places in 1993.

It is served by Amtrak's Blue Water and Wolverine trains and was formerly a stop for the International Limited. The Limited commenced service from Chicago to Toronto in 1982, and was discontinued in 2004. It was a joint operation by Via Rail and Amtrak.

== History ==
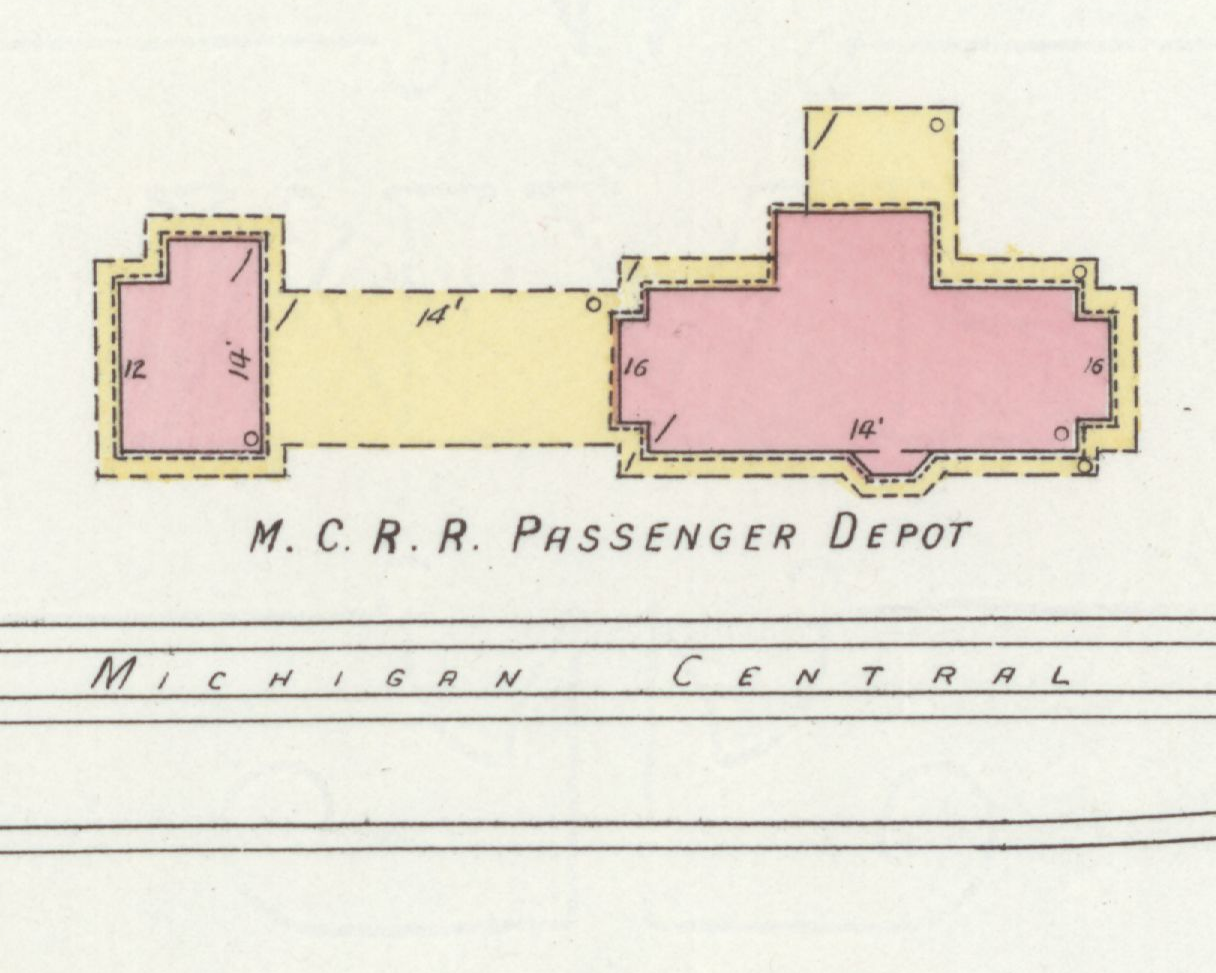
Passenger Depot, Michigan Central Railroad in 1908 Sanborn Fire Insurance map

The Michigan Central Railroad built a set of tracks providing passenger service through Dowagiac in 1848. A new depot was constructed in the 1870s. The current station, replacing the 1870s station, is the third constructed by the Michigan Railroad in Dowagiac. The architect for the station is not documented, but is almost certainly the firm of Spier and Rohns. The railway hired contractor M. J. Rogers of Detroit to supervise construction. The building was completed in 1903, and has remained in use as a passenger station since that time. A restoration project took place in 1995.

== Description ==
The depot is a single-story brick Tudor Revival structure trimmed with limestone. The depot consists of two hip roof buildings, one for passengers and one for baggage, connected with a gable roof canopy supported by metal columns. The passenger station has a square two-story tower projecting from the street side and a projecting octagonal ticket office on the track side. The station is accessed through a port cochere and glassed-in entry porch. Hip roof dormers are placed on the roof, and rows of square head windows line the sides of both the passenger station and baggage depot.
