= Only the Lonely (film) =

1991 film by Chris Columbus

- Theatrical release poster
- Directed by: Chris Columbus
- Written by: Chris Columbus
- Produced by: John Hughes; Hunt Lowry
- Starring: John Candy; Maureen O'Hara; Ally Sheedy; Kevin Dunn; Anthony Quinn; James Belushi
- Cinematography: Julio Macat
- Edited by: Raja Gosnell; Peter Teschner
- Music by: Maurice Jarre; Roy Orbison
- Production company: Hughes Entertainment
- Distributed by: 20th Century Fox
- Release date: May 24, 1991
- Running time: 104 minutes
- Country: United States
- Language: English
- Box office: $25.1 million

Only the Lonely is a 1991 American romantic comedy drama film written and directed by Chris Columbus and produced by John Hughes and Hunt Lowry. It stars John Candy, Maureen O'Hara, Ally Sheedy, Kevin Dunn, Anthony Quinn, and James Belushi. It follows Danny Muldoon (Candy), a middle-aged Chicago police officer whose developing relationship with shy mortuary worker Theresa Luna (Sheedy) is complicated by his devotion to his controlling mother, Rose (O'Hara).

Columbus wrote the role of Rose specifically for O'Hara, who had retired from acting before being persuaded to read the screenplay. She agreed to return after meeting Candy, and Only the Lonely became her final theatrical film role. Most of the film was shot on location in Chicago, including scenes at the former Comiskey Park, while its conclusion was filmed at the Amtrak station in Niles, Michigan. Maurice Jarre composed the original score.

Released by 20th Century Fox on May 24, 1991, Only the Lonely grossed $25.1 million worldwide. Critical reception was mixed.

== Plot ==
Chicago police officer Danny Muldoon is a lonely 38-year-old bachelor living with his overbearing mother, Rose. Since his father's death, Danny has carried the responsibility for his family, putting his brother Patrick through law school and caring for Rose, often imagining terrible things happening to her if he is not around to protect her. Patrick, now married with children, repeatedly urges Danny to stay single and move with Rose to Florida, while their neighbor Nick Acropolis persistently tries to court Rose himself.

One night, two men carry a corpse into a bar where Danny happens to be drinking, drawing the attention of the local funeral director and his shy daughter, Theresa Luna. Danny is immediately taken with Theresa and begins courting her. Their dates help Theresa grow in confidence, but the relationship soon strains under Danny's guilt about neglecting his mother and Rose's meddling, driven by fear of being left alone. When Rose finally meets Theresa for dinner, she insults her appearance and her mixed Sicilian/Polish heritage. Theresa stands up for herself, while Danny fails to defend her, prompting her to chastise him for his passivity. Later, Danny confronts his mother about her cruel remarks, reminding her that the only time he ever saw his father cry was after she sabotaged his business prospects by insulting a client under the guise of "telling it like it is"

Determined to move forward, Danny proposes to Theresa from the bucket of a Chicago fire truck outside her window. During his wedding suit fitting, Patrick once again urges him to move to Florida, arguing that Danny deserves better than Theresa. Danny rebuffs him, accusing Patrick of only wanting to keep him available to care for Rose to assuage his own guilt for not looking after her. Patrick presses him to be sure he is marrying for love and not simply out of loneliness. On the night before the wedding, Rose finally gives her blessing. However, after Danny interrupts his evening with Theresa to phone and check on his mother following the rehearsal dinner, Theresa realizes he will always put Rose first and leaves him. On the wedding day, neither Danny nor Theresa shows up, and their relationship ends.

Back in his routine life, Danny prepares to move to Florida with Rose. When an elderly friend, Doyle, dies, leaving behind no family and few friends, Danny realizes he does not want to share that same lonely fate. He goes to see Theresa but loses his nerve and walks away. On the day of the move, Danny tells Rose he will not be going as he wants to be with Theresa. Though heartbroken, Rose encourages him to find Theresa, marry her, and build a family. Aboard her flight to Florida, Rose discovers that Danny has given his seat to Nick, and the two hold hands.

Danny learns that Theresa has left for New York City by train. With the help of a friend at the railroad service, he stops the train at a nearby station. There, he apologizes to Theresa and confesses his love, telling her that he plans to move to New York and join the NYPD. Though still worried about Rose, Theresa admits she loves him too. Danny reassures her that she is his priority now. In one final vision, he imagines Rose and Nick heroically fending off terrorists on the plane, accepting at last that his mother can take care of herself. Danny and Theresa board the train together to start their new life in New York.

== Cast ==
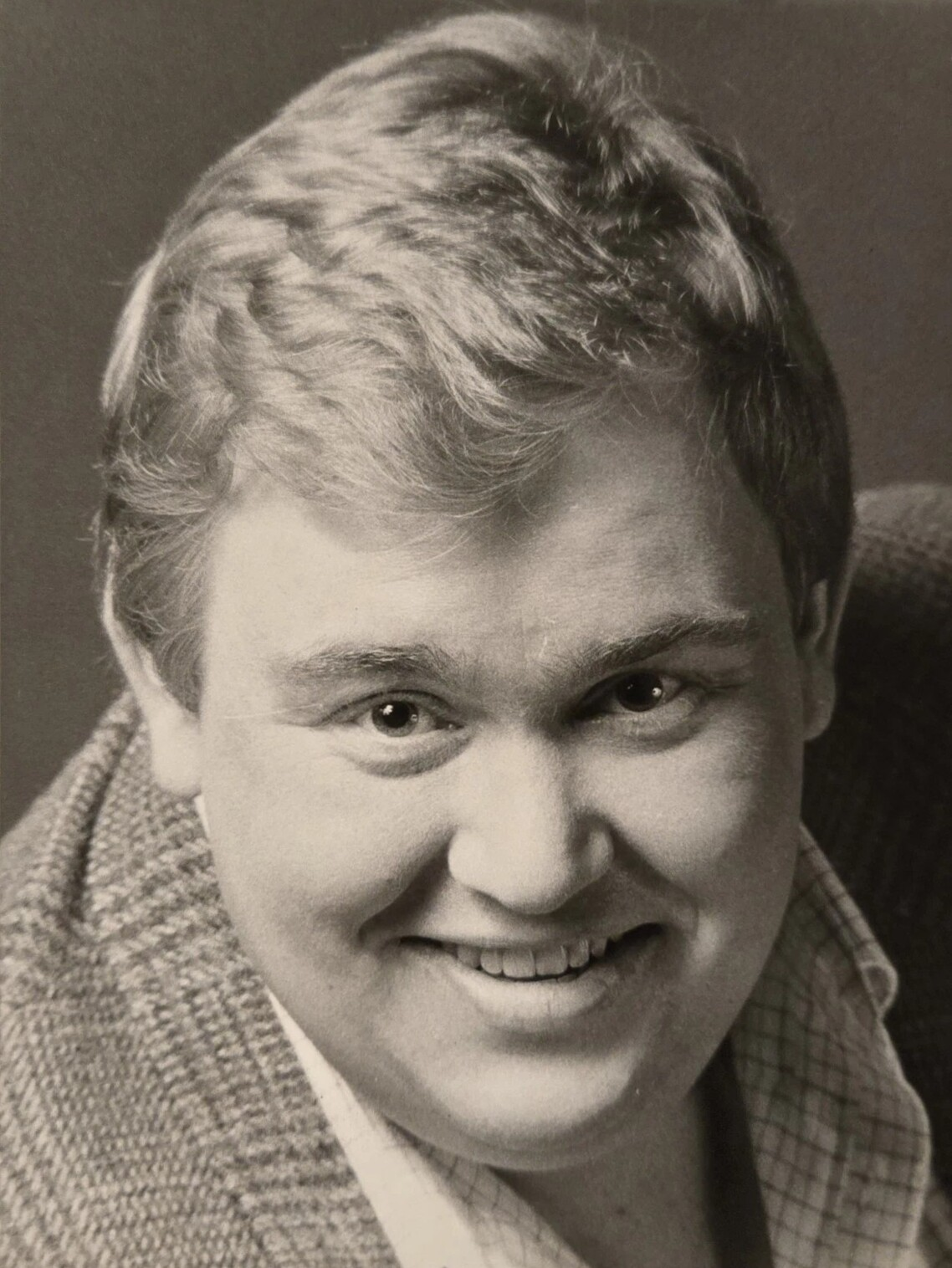
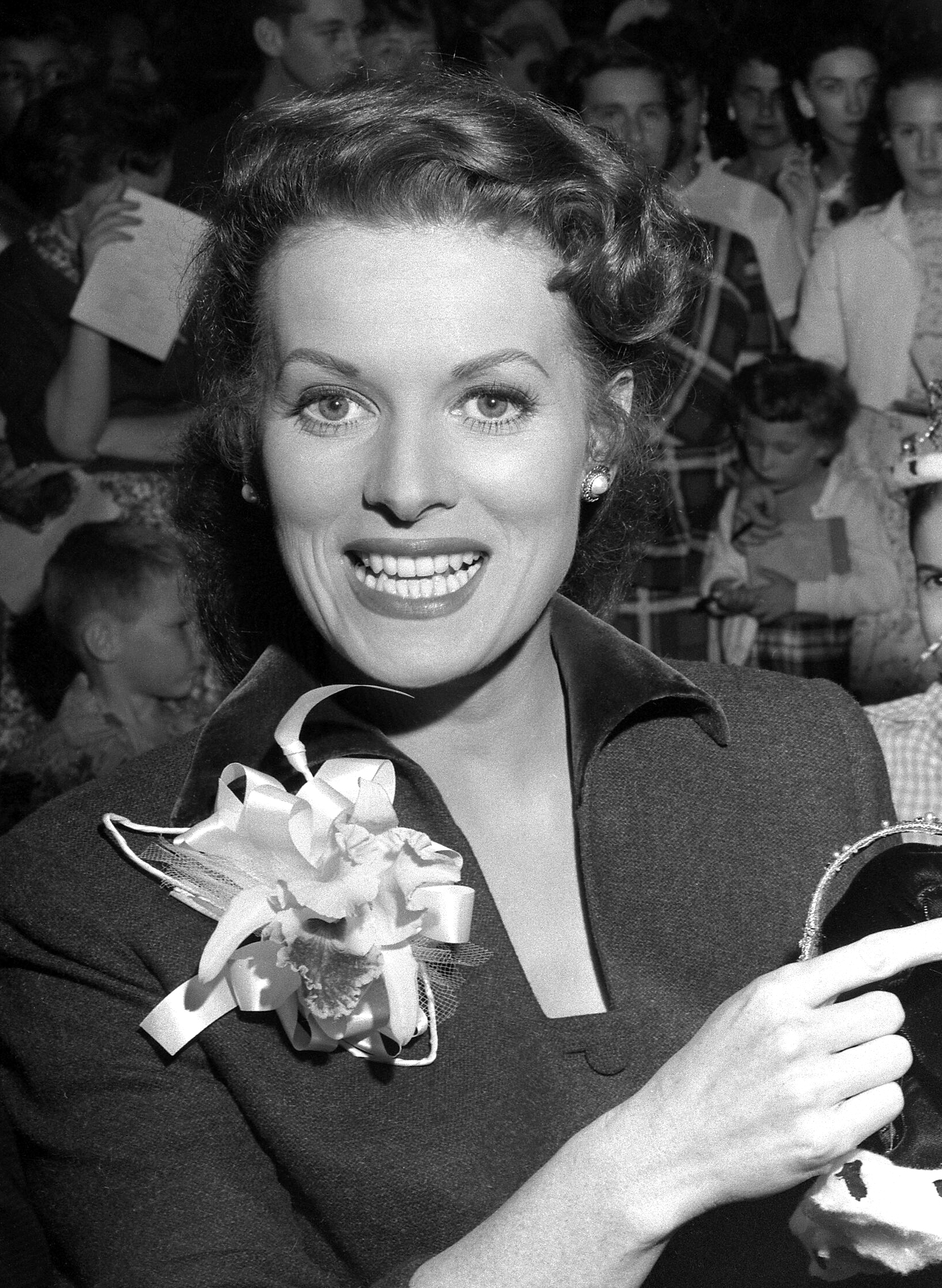
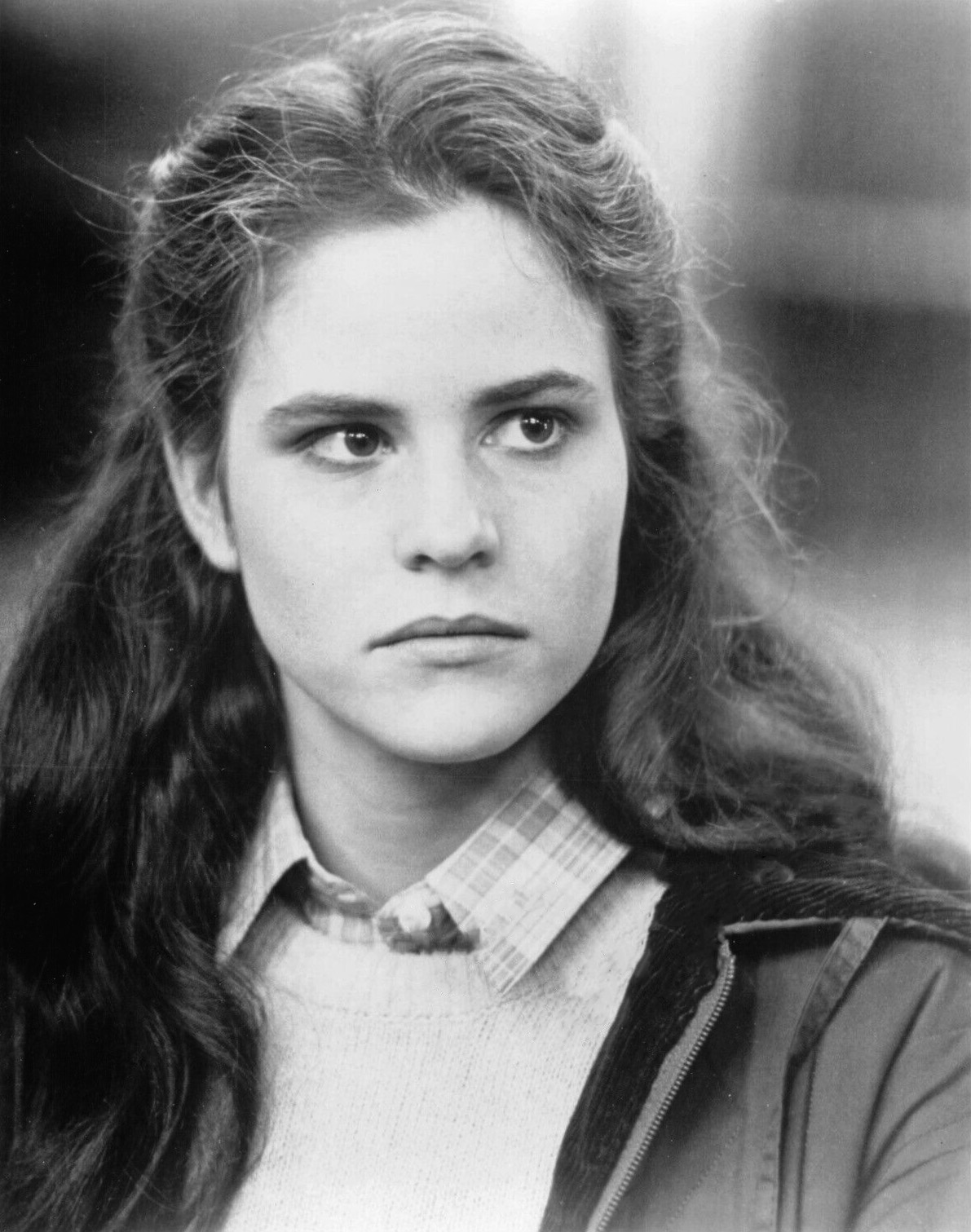
John Candy (pictured in 1982), Maureen O'Hara (1956), and Ally Sheedy (1982)
- John Candy as Daniel "Danny" Muldoon, a police officer in the Chicago Police Department.
- Maureen O'Hara as Rose Muldoon, the controlling mother of Danny.
- Ally Sheedy as Theresa Luna, a worker in a funeral home who is Danny's love interest.
- Kevin Dunn as Patrick Muldoon, the brother of Danny.
- Anthony Quinn as Nick Acropolis, the Greek neighbor of the Muldoons who has a crush on Rose.
- James Belushi as Salvatore "Sal" Buonarte, a police officer in the Chicago Police Department who is Danny's friend
- Macaulay Culkin as Billy Muldoon
- Kieran Culkin as Patrick Muldoon Jr.
- Milo O'Shea as Doyle
- Bert Remsen as Spats
- Joe Greco as Joey Luna, the father of Theresa and proprietor of a funeral home.

== Production ==
=== Casting ===
Chris Columbus wrote the part of Rose specifically for Maureen O'Hara, but did not know that she had retired from acting and was living in the Virgin Islands. Columbus contacted O'Hara's younger brother Charles B. Fitzsimons, a producer and actor in the film industry, to ask him to send O'Hara a copy of the script, which he did, telling her, "This you do!". O'Hara read the script and loved it. She was reported to have replied to Fitzsimons, "This I do!". However, she would not commit until she met co-star John Candy.

Co-star Jim Belushi recounted this story: On the set of Only the Lonely, the producers stuck Maureen O’Hara in a tiny trailer. When John Candy complained on her behalf, he was told the budget was being spent on the picture, not on accommodations for old movie stars. Candy responded by giving O'Hara his trailer and going without one until the studio finally caved in and got a trailer for each actor.

John Hughes co-produced the film. This movie marked Macaulay Culkin's third film with Hughes and Candy (after Home Alone and Uncle Buck). Other than New Port South, it was the only film Hughes produced that he did not write.

=== Filming ===
Most of the film was shot on location in Chicago. Danny and Rose Muldoon's house is located at the intersection of Clark Street and Roscoe Street, as is the front façade of O'Neils' Pub. The inside of the pub was shot at Emmett's Pub, a Chicago landmark that was also used in Uncle Buck, another film with John Candy. At the request of producer John Hughes (a Chicagoan and big fan of the Chicago White Sox) and sports fan John Candy, the baseball stadium where Danny and Theresa's first date took place was arranged to be set at old Comiskey Park (home of the Chicago White Sox until 1990). Hughes hastily arranged the filming, as the stadium was slated to be torn down imminently. There is also a shot showing old Comiskey Park and the new Rate Field, the current home of the White Sox, under construction next door. Comiskey Park was located at the corner of 35th St. and Shields Ave., on the South Side of Chicago. The scene where Danny and Theresa kiss along Lake Michigan is located at Lincoln Park, Chicago, and the dinner scene was shot at One Ambassador East, also known as the Ambassador East Hotel, located at 1301 North State Parkway in Chicago's Gold Coast. The church scenes were filmed at St. John Cantius Church in West Town on 825 N Carpenter St.

The final scene with Danny and Theresa was shot at the Amtrak station in Niles, Michigan, which was renamed to Willoughby and decorated with Christmas lights for the filming.

=== Music ===
Roy Orbison's song "Only the Lonely" is played in its entirety in the movie's opening scene. "Someone Like You" by Van Morrison is played during one of Danny and Theresa's dates. "Dreams to Remember" by Etta James is played, also in its entirety. Also, "Pachelbel's Canon" is played briefly during the wedding scene. The film's original music was composed and conducted by Maurice Jarre.

The soundtrack album was released by Varèse Sarabande, featuring 28 minutes of Jarre's score and the songs "Only the Lonely" and "Someone Like You."

== Release ==
=== Box office ===
Only the Lonely was released in the United States and Canada on May 24, 1991. During its opening weekend it grossed a total of $6 million from 1,521 theaters—an average of $3,943 per theater—making it the fifth-highest-grossing film of the weekend, behind the debuting Thelma & Louise ($6.1 million) and ahead of the debuting Drop Dead Fred ($3.6 million). In its second weekend, Only the Lonely retained the number five position with a $3.6 million gross, placing it behind Thelma & Louise ($4.2 million) and ahead of Hudson Hawk ($3.1 million), also in its second week of release. It fell to the number eight position in its third weekend with a $2.1 million gross, again behind Thelma & Louise ($3 million) and ahead of Hudson Hawk ($1.5 million). Only the Lonely left the top-ten highest-grossing films after four weeks.

Only the Lonely was the 60th-highest-grossing film of 1991, grossing $21.8M domestically and $3.3M internationally — for a total box office of $25M.

=== Critical reception ===
On Rotten Tomatoes, the film has an approval rating of 70% based on reviews from 23 critics, with an average rating of 6/10. On Metacritic, the film has a weighted average score of 47 out of 100 based on 21 critics, indicating "mixed or average reviews". Audiences polled by CinemaScore gave the film an average grade of "B+" on an A+ to F scale.

Entertainment Weekly gave it a grade C.
