= Lake Cities =

Lake Cities was the name of two different passenger trains:

- Lake Cities (Erie Railroad train), operated by the Erie Railroad and its successor, Erie Lackawanna from 1947 to 1970
- Lake Cities (Amtrak train), operated by Amtrak from 1980 to 2004
