= Wolverine (train) =

Amtrak service between Chicago, Illinois, and Pontiac, Michigan

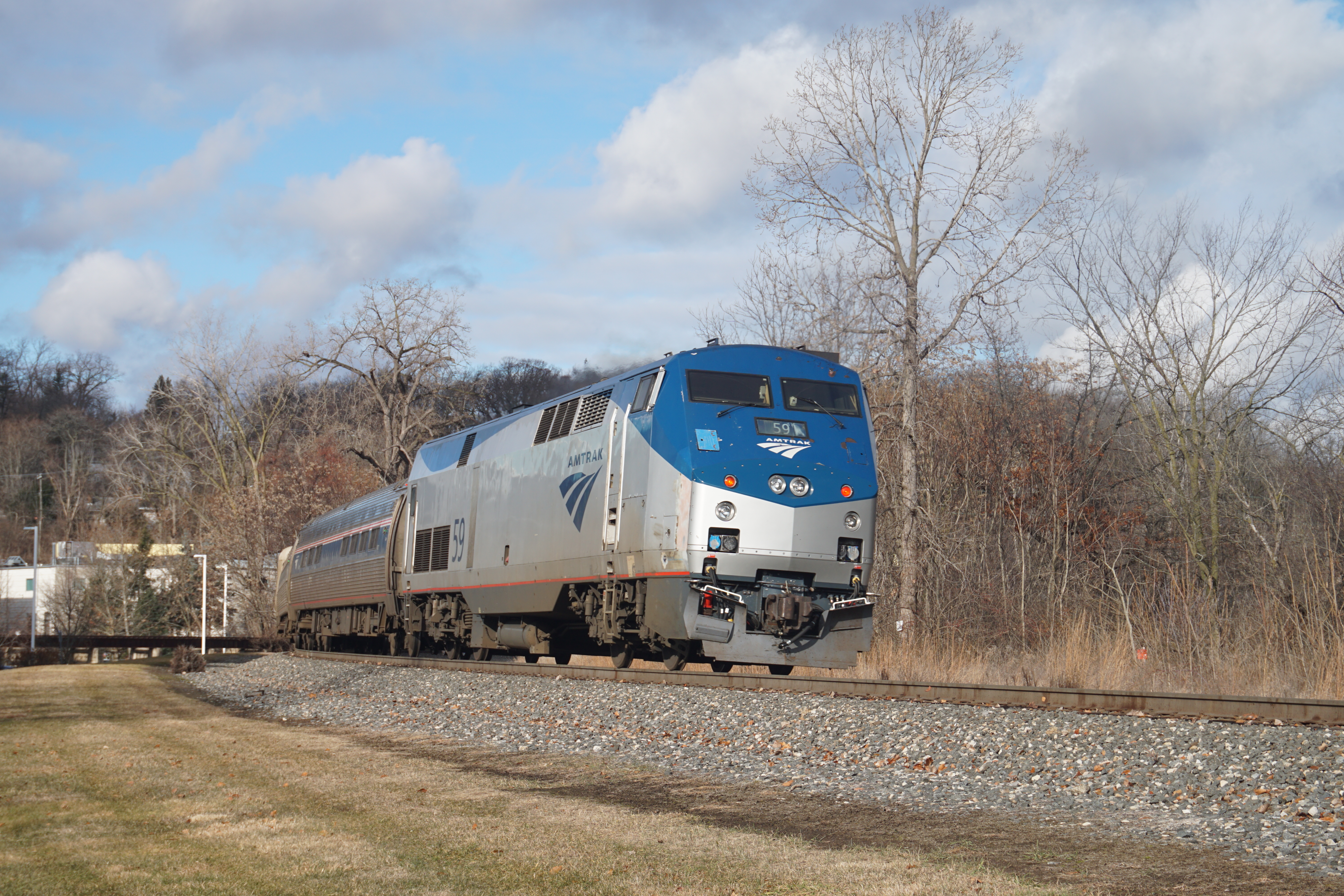
- The Wolverine in Ann Arbor, Michigan, December 2019.

Overview
- Service type: Higher-speed inter-city rail
- Locale: Midwestern United States
- First service: May 1, 1971
- Current operator: Amtrak
- Former operator: Penn Central
- Annual ridership: 438,427 (FY 25) ▲3% (Note: Amtrak's Fiscal Year (FY) runs from October 1 of the prior year to September 30 of the named year.)

Route
- Termini: Chicago, Illinois; Pontiac, Michigan
- Stops: 17
- Distance travelled: 304 miles (489 km)
- Average journey time: 6 hours
- Service frequency: Three daily roundtrips
- Train numbers: 350, 352, 354 (eastbound); 351, 353, 355 (westbound)

On-board services
- Catering facilities: Café Car

Technical
- Rolling stock: Amfleet / Siemens Venture; Siemens Charger
- Track gauge: 4 ft 8 1/2 in (1,435 mm) standard gauge
- Operating speed: Service: 110 mph (177 km/h); Average (incl. stops): 52 mph (84 km/h)
- Track owners: NS, CN, Amtrak, MDOT, CR

The Wolverine is a higher-speed passenger train service operated by Amtrak as part of its Michigan Services. The 304-mile (489 km) line provides three daily round-trips between Chicago and Pontiac, Michigan, via Ann Arbor and Detroit. It carries a heritage train name descended from the New York Central Railroad (Michigan Central).

During fiscal year 2023, the Wolverine carried 420,569 passengers, a 14.5% increase from FY2022's total of 367,254 passengers.

== History ==
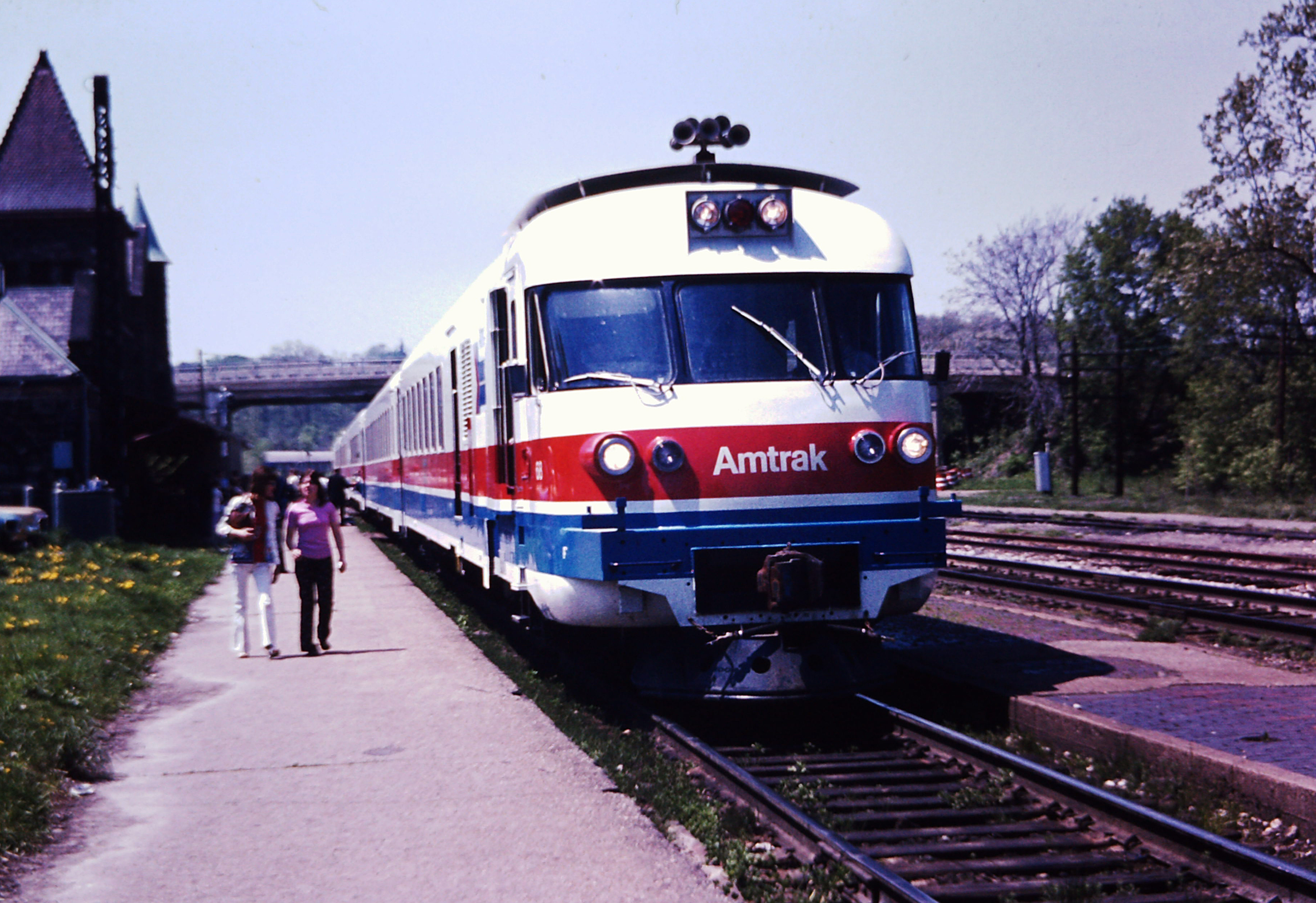
A Turboliner at Ann Arbor in 1975

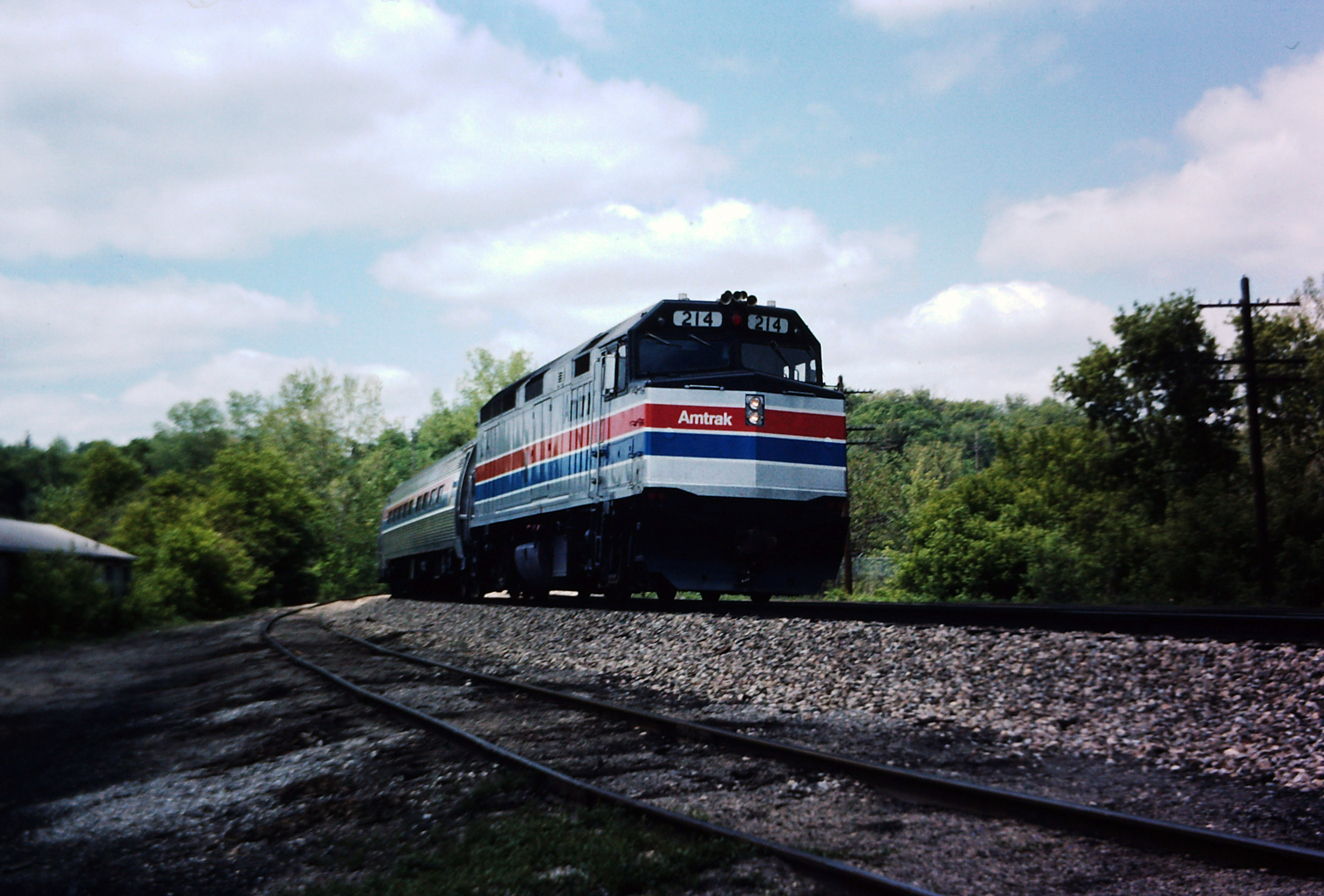
The Turboliner's replacement - an EMD F40PH with Amfleet coaches - in 1976

Before Amtrak's takeover of most private-sector passenger service in 1971 the Wolverine was one of three trains which operated over the Michigan Central route between Chicago and Detroit. Under Penn Central operation it continued through South-Western Ontario (Canada) to Buffalo, New York. Amtrak retained two trains (the other was the renamed St. Clair) and truncated the operation to Detroit but otherwise changed little. In April 1975, Amtrak introduced French-built gas-turbine-powered Turboliner trainsets to the Michigan route and added a third round-trip. A pool of three Turboliner trainsets served the route, and the three round-trip pairs were numbered 350—355, train numbers which are still in use today. Amtrak dropped the individual train names and rebranded all three Turboliner, in common with similar services to St. Louis, Missouri and Milwaukee, Wisconsin. The new equipment led to massive gains in ridership, topping 340,000 in 1975 and 370,000 in 1976.

The Turboliners became a victim of their own success. Although fast (and flashy), they were unable to reach their design speed of 125 miles per hour (201 km/h) because of the poor quality of the Penn Central track in Michigan. The five-car fixed consists had a maximum capacity of 292 passengers, which was often not enough. Starting in March 1976 Amtrak began replacing some of the Turboliners with conventional equipment, including new Amfleet coaches. Individual names returned to the corridor, with the heretofore unnamed third train becoming the Twilight Limited. The last Turboliners left the corridor in 1981.

Amtrak extended the Wolverine and Twilight Limited to Pontiac on May 5, 1994. With this change service began at a new station in Detroit's New Center. Although the Michigan Central Station in Corktown, Detroit, had closed on January 6, 1988, trains continued to stop at a temporary platform just east of the old station. Besides Pontiac, new stations were opened at Royal Oak and Troy. The Lake Cities also began serving Pontiac after the end of Toledo service in 1995.

Amtrak dropped individual names again in 2004 and named all three trains Wolverine.

Due to the increased ridership on these trains, Amtrak tested an additional Chicago-Kalamazoo Wolverine frequency September 2 to 7, 2010. This was done to determine all that would be involved in operations should Amtrak decide to initiate such service in the future.

Michigan City station closed on April 4, 2022. At that time, it was served by just 1 1/2 round trips.

=== Higher-speed operation ===
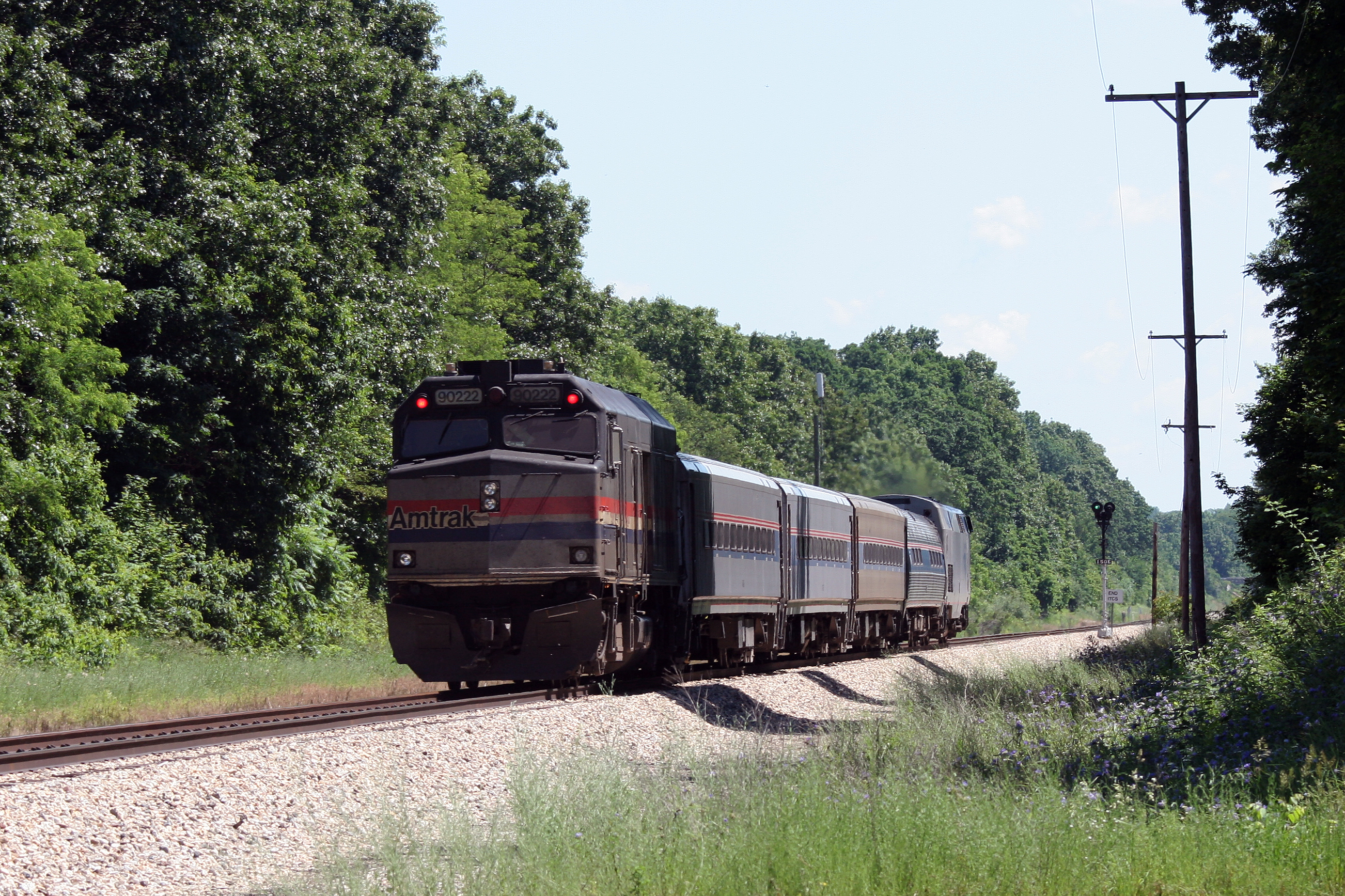
A Wolverine train west of Kalamazoo in 2009. In 2012, speeds in this area were increased to 110 miles per hour (177 km/h).

The federal government considers high-speed rail service to be rail service which at any time reaches the speed of 110 miles per hour (177 km/h) or higher. In 2006 the Detroit–Chicago corridor was designated by the Federal Railroad Administration as a high-speed rail corridor and in October 2010, the State of Michigan received US$150 million from the federal government to increase track speeds to 110 mph (177 km/h) between Kalamazoo and Dearborn. In 2016, work to allow higher-speed operation on 41 miles (66 km) of track between Battle Creek and Jackson, including "...replacing 26,000 railroad ties, repairing or installing 15 track switches, realigning or modifying 29 railroad curves, repairing 23 railroad grade crossings and improving road profiles at crossings", was completed.

Amtrak owns the 97-mile (156 km) stretch of the Wolverine's route from Porter, Indiana to Kalamazoo, Michigan and it is the longest segment of track owned by Amtrak outside of the Northeast Corridor. Starting in January 2002 Amtrak began track improvements to increase the allowed speed along this section of track. Amtrak trains currently travel at top speeds of 110 mph (177 km/h) along this section of track.

In December 2012, MDOT completed its purchase from Norfolk Southern of 135 miles (217 km) of track between Kalamazoo and Dearborn. This will make it easier to maintain track and eventually upgrade it to 110-mile-per-hour (180 km/h) running. As part of the purchase agreement, MDOT also agreed to double-track the line east of Ypsilanti.

On May 25, 2021, the maximum speed on the 45-mile (72 km) section between Kalamazoo and Albion was increased to 110 mph (177 km/h). The section between Albion and Jackson was expected to be upgraded to the higher speed limit during fiscal year 2022, followed by the Ypsilanti to Dearborn section in fiscal year 2023. The final MDOT-owned section between Jackson and Ypsilanti would be targeted for the higher speed limit in fiscal year 2024. On-time performance increased from under 35% in 2019 to nearly 70% in 2025.

=== Proposed expansion ===
In a June 2014 report prepared for MDOT, the number of round trips on the Wolverine line was projected to increase from 3 to 10 by the year 2035. By that time, the line was planned to have double-tracking for about 75% of the route. As of 2015, about 160 mi (260 km) of the line was not double-tracked.

In March 2016, Ypsilanti approved $2 million toward the construction of a train platform in the Depot Town area of the city along the Wolverine route. MDOT estimated that the stop would attract 9,000 annual riders. In June 2020 the city rescinded the $2 million after failing to receive a federal grant to move the project forward. The last train to serve Ypsilanti was the Twilight Limited in 1985.

In August 2019, Amtrak proposed extending at least one round trip from Detroit to Toronto via the Windsor–Quebec City Corridor. The service would require track upgrades and the construction of a border processing facility. An intermediate Amtrak Thruway bus connection to Toronto was also raised. The extension is planned to begin service in 2027, pending customs approvals and track upgrades.

=== Corridor names ===
This table shows the names given to trains which operated over the Chicago-Detroit corridor under Amtrak. It excludes trains that diverge at Battle Creek, the Blue Water and International, or the local Michigan Executive commuter service. Shortly after Amtrak began operating the ex-Penn Central services, trains regained names, train #14/17 reclaimed Wolverine and train #355/356, formerly the Twilight Limited, became the Saint Clair. Turboliner Service was used in conjunction with conventional named Amfleet-equipped service.

== Route details ==
Amtrak Wolverine

The Wolverine operates over Norfolk Southern Railway, Amtrak, Conrail, and Canadian National Railway trackage:

- NS Chicago Line, Chicago to Porter
- Amtrak Chicago–Detroit Line, Porter to Kalamazoo
- MDOT (d/b/a Amtrak) Michigan Line, Kalamazoo to Dearborn (CN South Bend Sub from CP Gord to CP Baron in Battle Creek, MI)
- CR Michigan Line, Dearborn (CP Townline) to Detroit (CP Conrail)
- CN Shore Line Subdivision and Holly Subdivision, Detroit (Federal Junction) to Pontiac

== Stations ==
State	Town/city	Station	Connections
Illinois	Chicago	Chicago Union Station	Amtrak (long-distance): California Zephyr, Cardinal, City of New Orleans, Empire Builder, Floridian, Lake Shore Limited, Southwest Chief, Texas Eagle; Amtrak (intercity): Blue Water, Borealis, Hiawatha, Illini and Saluki, Illinois Zephyr and Carl Sandburg, Lincoln Service, Pere Marquette; Metra: BNSF, Heritage Corridor, Milwaukee District North, Milwaukee District West, North Central Service, SouthWest Service; Chicago "L": Blue (at Clinton), Brown Orange Pink Purple (at Quincy); CTA Bus, Pace Bus; Amtrak Thruway to Madison, Rockford (Van Galder), Louisville (Greyhound)
Indiana	Hammond	Hammond–Whiting	
Indiana	Michigan City	Michigan City	Closed April 4, 2022
Michigan	New Buffalo	New Buffalo	Amtrak: Blue Water
Michigan	Niles	Niles	Amtrak: Blue Water
Michigan	Dowagiac	Dowagiac	Amtrak: Blue Water
Michigan	Kalamazoo	Kalamazoo; Transportation Center	Amtrak: Blue Water; Metro Transit; Intercity bus: Indian Trails, Greyhound Lines
Michigan	Battle Creek	Battle Creek; Transportation Center	Amtrak: Blue Water, Amtrak Thruway; Battle Creek Transit; Greyhound Lines
Michigan	Albion	Albion	
Michigan	Jackson	Jackson	Jackson Area Transportation Authority; Greyhound Lines
Michigan	Ann Arbor	Ann Arbor	TheRide; Amtrak Thruway
Michigan	Dearborn	John D. Dingell; Transit Center	Suburban Mobility Authority for Regional Transportation; Greyhound Lines
Michigan	Dearborn	Greenfield Village	Closed December 10, 2014
Michigan	Detroit	Detroit	QLine; DDOT, Suburban Mobility Authority for Regional Transportation; Amtrak Thruway
Michigan	Royal Oak	Royal Oak	Suburban Mobility Authority for Regional Transportation
Michigan	Troy	Troy Transit Center	Suburban Mobility Authority for Regional Transportation
Michigan	Birmingham	Birmingham	Closed October 13, 2014
Michigan	Pontiac	Pontiac; Transportation Center	Suburban Mobility Authority for Regional Transportation; Intercity bus: Indian Trails, Greyhound Lines

== Equipment ==
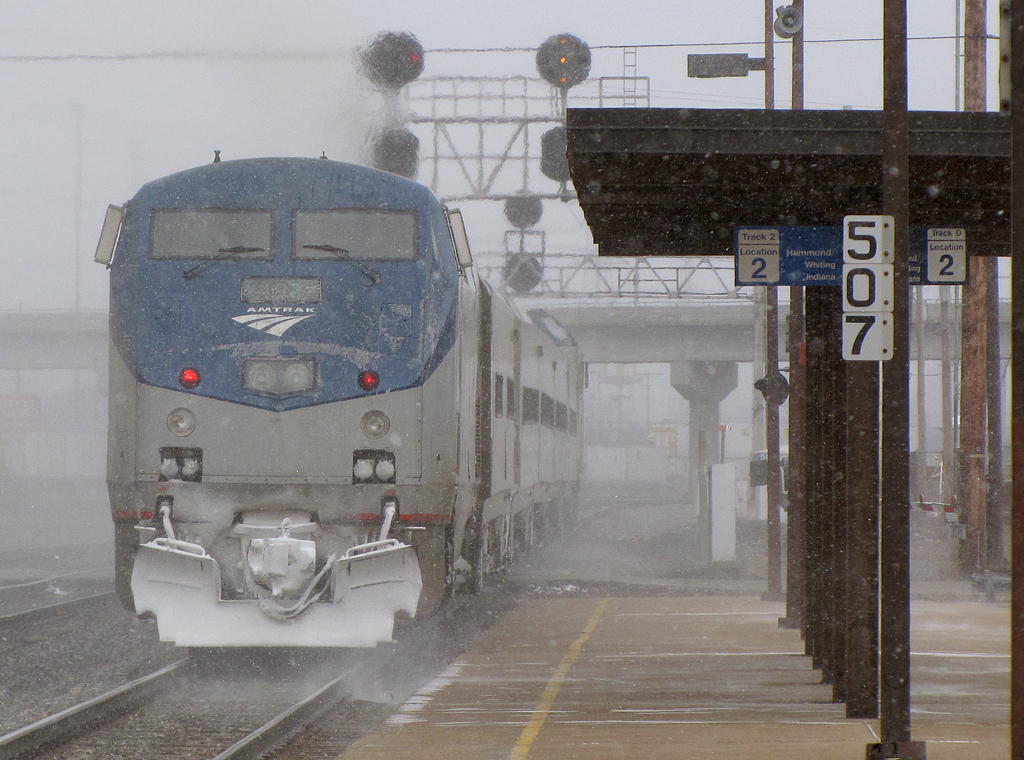
A Wolverine with older equipment departs Hammond–Whiting station in 2008

As of 2025, each Wolverine operates with two state-owned Siemens Charger locomotives, 3-5 Siemens Venture coaches, one Venture business class car, and one Venture cafe car. Amfleet and (until early-2025) Horizon cars are still sometimes used as the Venture cars are being gradually phased into service. The locomotives operate in top and tail configuration, with one locomotive on each end of the consist. Due to the FRA requirement of positive train control for operations above 79 mph, locomotives on the Wolverine are required to have Positive Train Control, supplied by Amtrak's Incremental Train Control System. Because of this modification the units equipped with PTC are usually captive to the Michigan services.

Between 2016 and 2018 Michigan expected to take delivery of new bilevel cars which would displace the Horizons and Amfleets in regular service. In addition, in early 2014 the Michigan Department of Transportation issued a request for proposal aimed at acquiring additional passenger equipment for use between 2014 and 2017.

In September 2014, the state of Michigan reached an agreement with Talgo, a Spanish railcar manufacturer, to buy two trainsets for the Wolverine, at a cost of $58 million. The trains had been previously built for the state of Wisconsin, before plans for expanded passenger rail service in that state were canceled and the trainsets placed in storage. The new equipment would have provided a substantial upgrade in passenger amenities over the Amtrak-owned railcars used on the route. Despite this proposal, the Talgo railcars remained at the Amtrak facility in Beech Grove until 2019 when they were moved back to Milwaukee. In 2019, the trains were being considered for use for the Amtrak Cascades route in the Pacific Northwest instead of in Michigan, but the trains were ultimately sold to Nigeria for use on the Lagos Rail Mass Transit.

The bilevel car order never materialized due to the failure of a critical crash test by the manufacturer. In the end, the order was switched to new single-level Siemens Venture cars that are similar to the Brightline fleet. By January 2021, some Venture cars had been delivered to Amtrak for testing and were being deployed on the Wolverine route for test runs.

Michigan was also involved in a joint purchase with other states to purchase the new Siemens Charger locomotives.

== See also ==
- Ohio Hub
