= Battle Creek Transit =

Public transit service in Michigan, US

- Headquarters: 339 West Michigan Avenue
- Locale: Battle Creek, Michigan
- Service area: Calhoun County, Michigan
- Service type: bus service, paratransit
- Routes: 8
- Fleet: Blue Bird Xcel, Gillig Low Floor
- Daily ridership: 600 (weekdays, Q1 2025)
- Annual ridership: 166,000 (2024)
- Fuel type: Diesel, Propane
- Website: battlecreekmi.gov/transit

Battle Creek Transit is the primary provider of mass transportation in Calhoun County, Michigan, United States. Eight Routes provide service from Monday through Saturday. In 2007, all buses were equipped with bike racks. Nearly 500 designated stops are available within the system. Current service times area 5:15 am – 6:45 pm Monday-Friday, 9:15 am – 5:15 pm Saturday. No service on Sunday or major holidays. In 2024, the system had a ridership of 166,000, or about 600 per weekday as of the first quarter of 2025.

== Route list & Details ==
Route	Route Name	Key Destinations
1W	West Michigan	Leila Arboretum, Urbandale Area, Urbandale Plaza, Limited Service to: Northwestern Junior High. Saturday Service to Rolling Hills Trailer Park, Arbor Pointe Townhomes and Bedford Manor.
2E	Emmett/East	Battle Creek Health System, Kellogg Community College, Calhoun Area Technical Center, Southwest Rehab Center, W.K. Kellogg Junior High School, Westbrook Place Apartments.
2W	Columbia/Territorial	Share Center, Columbia Ave. Shopping Areas, Columbia Plaza, Meijer on Columbia Ave., Lakeview High School (closest stop at Meijer), Lakeview Junior High School, Family Fare Store (Columbia), Lakeview Meadows, W.M.U. College of Aviation/Kellogg Airport (closest stop: 31st St. & Goguac St.)
3E	Main/Post	Toeller Building, Main St. Market, River Oaks Apartments (due to poor road conditions on Taft St. Closest stop is at Main St. Market), Post Cereal Plant, Post Park,
3W	Kendall/Goodale	Battle Creek Central High School, Hart-Dole-Inouye Federal Center, Save-A-Lot, Springview Tower (limited service), Parkway Manor Apartments, Northwestern Junior High
4N	NE Capital	Willard Library Main Branch, Cherry Hill Manor, Battle Creek YMCA, Verona Area, Bailey Park, C.O. Brown Stadium, Family Fare Store (NE Capital), The Pines of Pennfield Apartments, Battle Creek City Hall, Calhoun County Justice Complex
4S	SW Capital	K-Mart, Lakeview Shopping District, Family Fare (Columbia), Secretary of State Office, Social Security Office, Arbors Apartments, Landings Apartments, Southwest Eye Center, Willard Library (South Branch), Minges Brook Mall (Target, Comcast, ABC Warehouse, Big Lots), Wal-Mart (selected trips), Meijer (B Dr. N., selected trips), Lakeview Square Mall, Beckley Rd. Shopping Areas.
5W	Fort Custer/VA Hospital	Fort Custer Industrial Park, VA Hospital, Denso, II Stanley, Regional Technology Center, Liberty Commons Apartments

== Bus Transfer Station ==
The BCT Bus Transfer Station, located on McCamly Street across from the Amtrak station, serves as the primary transfer point for the system. The open-air facility opened for service on July 19, 2011.

== Fixed route ridership ==
The ridership statistics shown here are of fixed route services only and do not include demand response services.

== See also ==
- List of bus transit systems in the United States
- Battle Creek station
- Kalamazoo Metro Transit
