= Kalamazoo Metro =

Public transit agency in Kalamazoo County, Michigan, United States

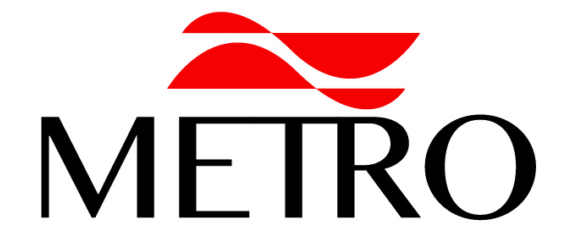

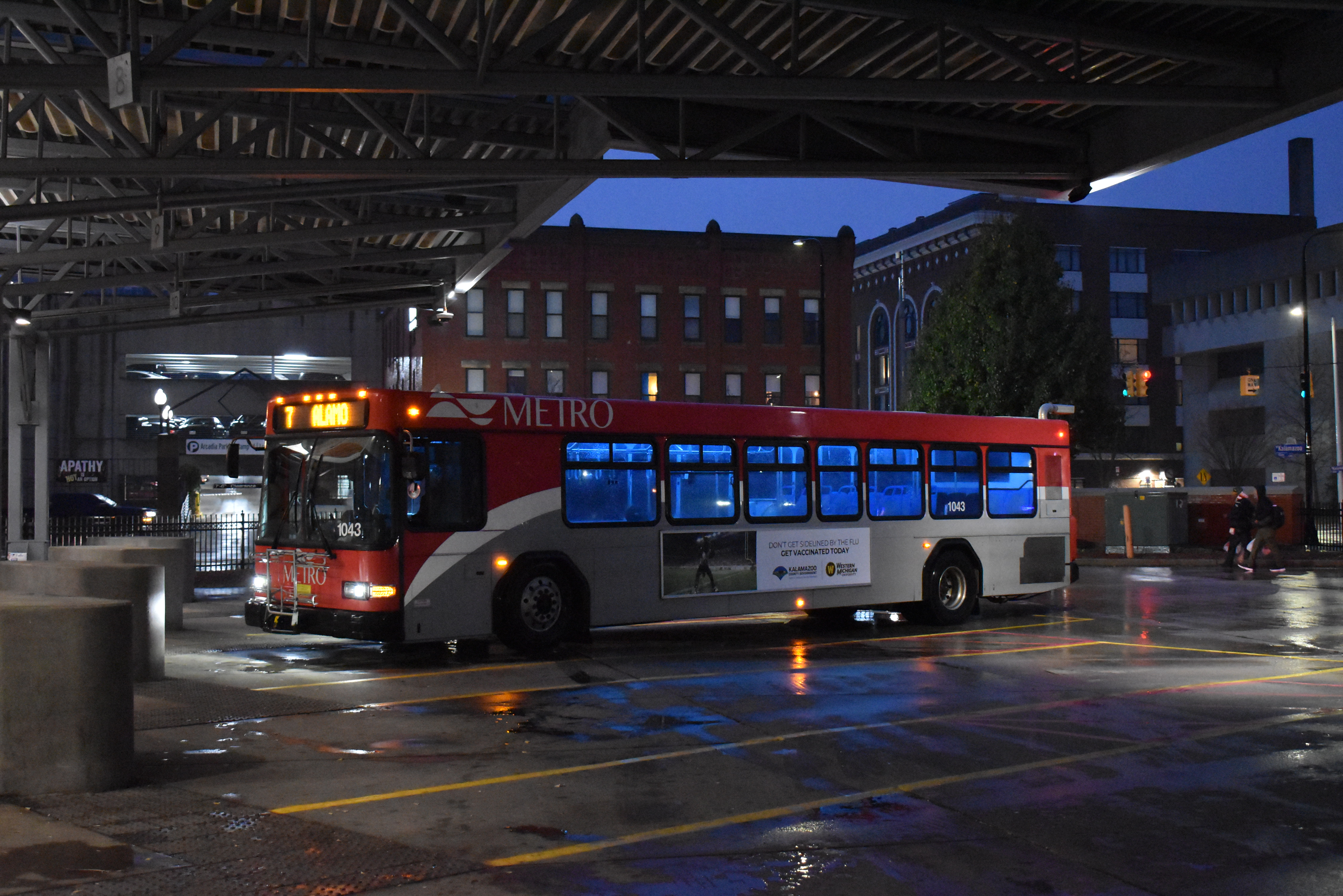
- A Metro bus at the Kalamazoo Transportation Center
- Parent: Central County Transportation Authority
- Commenced operation: 1967; 58 years ago
- Service area: Kalamazoo County, Michigan
- Service type: Bus; Paratransit
- Stations: Kalamazoo Transportation Center
- Daily ridership: 5,900 (weekdays, Q3 2025)
- Annual ridership: 1,819,500 (2024)
- Website: kmetro.com

Metro (also known as KMetro) is the operator of public transit services in the Kalamazoo metropolitan area of Michigan. Metro operates fixed-route bus service on 21 routes, serving the city of Kalamazoo, its immediate suburbs, and Western Michigan University. It also provides demand-response service in all of Kalamazoo County, with additional paratransit and microtransit services in the region served by its fixed-route buses.

Metro operates a fleet of 94 vehicles, providing fixed-route services in a 109-square-mile (280 km^{2}) region. In 2024, the system had a ridership of 1,819,500, or about 5,900 per weekday as of the third quarter of 2025.

Metro began service in 1967 as Kalamazoo Metro Transit, taking over the operations of private operator Kalamazoo City Lines. Metro Transit was operated by the City of Kalamazoo from 1967 to 2016, when the Central County Transportation Authority took over operations. Metro's rural services are funded by the Kalamazoo County Transportation Authority, a separate but closely related agency. The current "Metro" branding was introduced in 2018.

== Services ==
Metro operates fixed-route bus, demand-response bus, paratransit, and microtransit services in Kalamazoo County.

Metro's fixed-route system serves the city of Kalamazoo and its immediate suburbs, including Portage and Comstock Township. Metro operates 21 fixed routes, including 3 Western Michigan University campus shuttle routes. 15 routes connect at the Kalamazoo Transportation Center, which also serves Amtrak trains and intercity buses. Additional transfer points include The Crossroads in Portage, the Western Michigan University main campus, and Maple Hill Pavilion in Oshtemo Township.

Metro serves rural Kalamazoo County with its Metro Connect demand-response service, which requires advance reservations. Parts of Metro's fixed-route service area are served by Metro Link microtransit service, operated by Via Transportation, which does not require advance reservations. Metro also provides vehicles to nonprofit and government organizations for transporting seniors and persons with disabilities through the Metro Share program.

== History ==
=== Predecessors ===
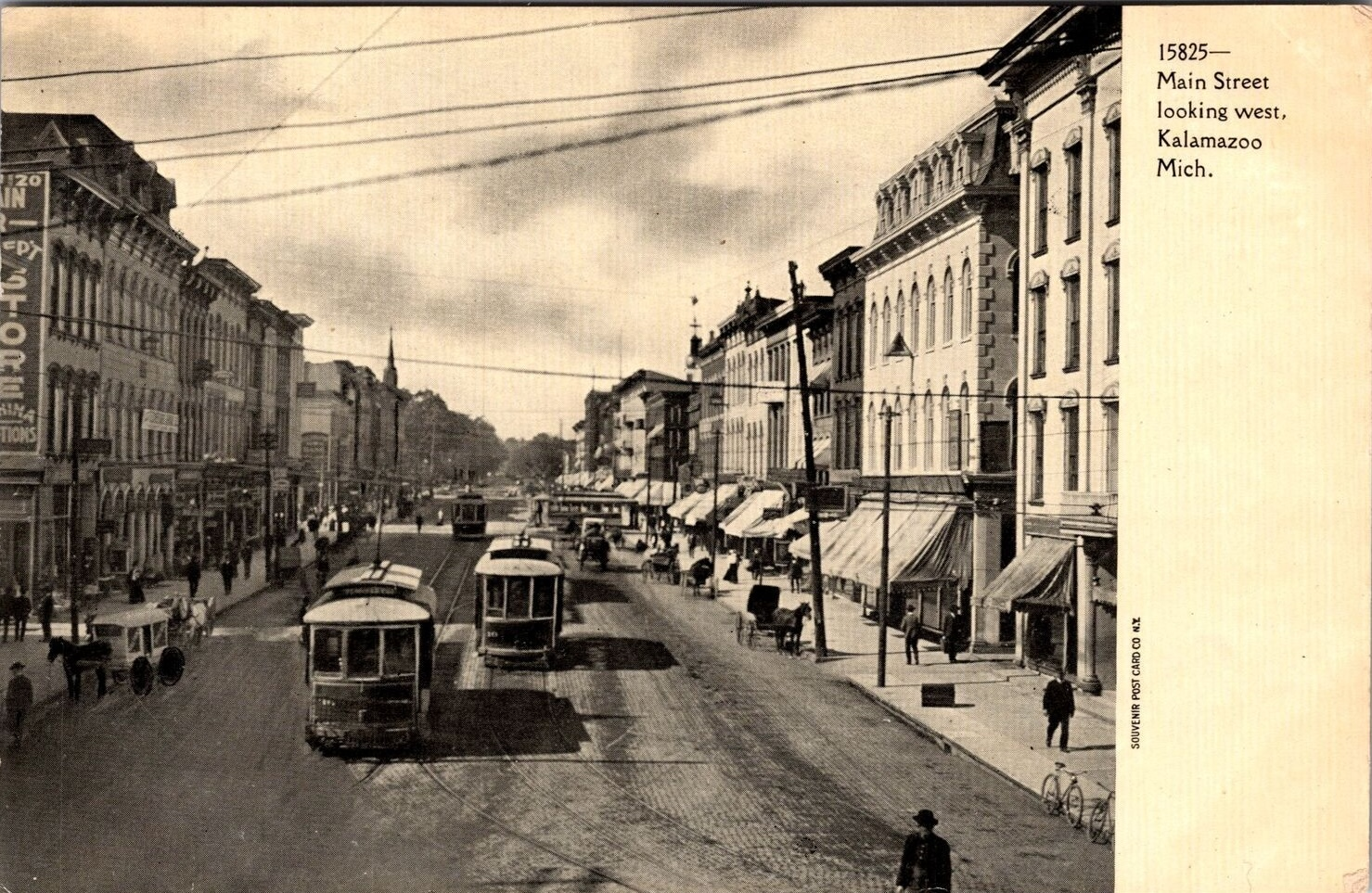
Streetcars on Main Street in Kalamazoo, c. 1906

The history of public transit service in Kalamazoo dates to 1884, with the establishment of the city's first horsecar line. Electric streetcar service began in 1893, initially operated by the Citizens’ Street Railway Company. The Citizens’ Street Railway Company was bought out by a succession of local interests in the early 1900s, and was absorbed by the Michigan United Railways in 1906. The first public motor bus service in Kalamazoo County began in 1905, using an Oldsmobile Ten Passenger Wagonette. The bus service connected Nazareth Academy with the East Main Street streetcar line's terminus at the Kalamazoo city limits, a distance of approximately one mile (1.6 km).

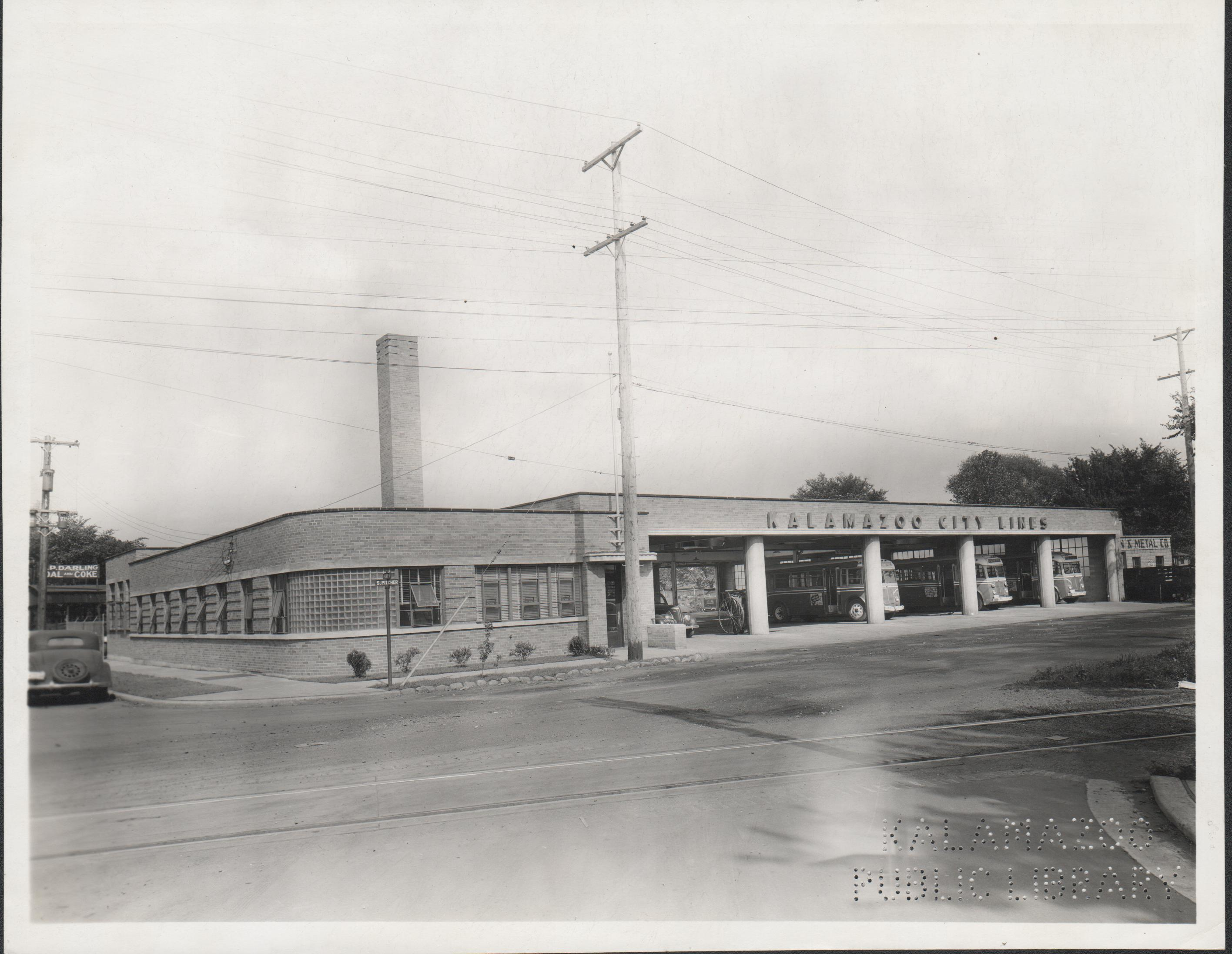
Kalamazoo City Lines bus garage, 1941

The Michigan United Railways found the Kalamazoo streetcar lines to be unprofitable in the late 1920s, and sold them in 1929. Streetcars continued operating until 1932, when they were replaced by buses operated by the Kalamazoo Motor Coach Company. From 1936 to 1967, the Kalamazoo bus system was operated by Kalamazoo City Lines, an affiliate of National City Lines.

=== Founding ===
The City of Kalamazoo entered into a lease agreement with Kalamazoo City Lines in 1958, where the city took over the planning and funding of bus service, and hired Kalamazoo City Lines to operate it. National City Lines ended its services in Jackson in 1964, leading to concerns that service in Kalamazoo would soon meet the same fate.

In the November 8, 1966 municipal election, Kalamazoo voters approved a city charter amendment that authorized the city to operate bus service directly. The city of Kalamazoo began operation of the bus system on January 1, 1967, retaining most of the staff of Kalamazoo City Lines. The newly formed service was branded as "Metro Transit" in October 1967, coinciding with the arrival of a fleet of new GM New Look buses, funded in part by a federal grant.

=== Expansion ===
Metro Transit expanded its services in the 1970s, extending bus lines outside Kalamazoo city limits. A new fleet of fully wheelchair-accessible buses was placed in service in 1980, the first fully accessible bus fleet in the state of Michigan. Metro Transit installed automatic passenger counters on its buses in 1980 as part of a demonstration project, funded by the state of Michigan.

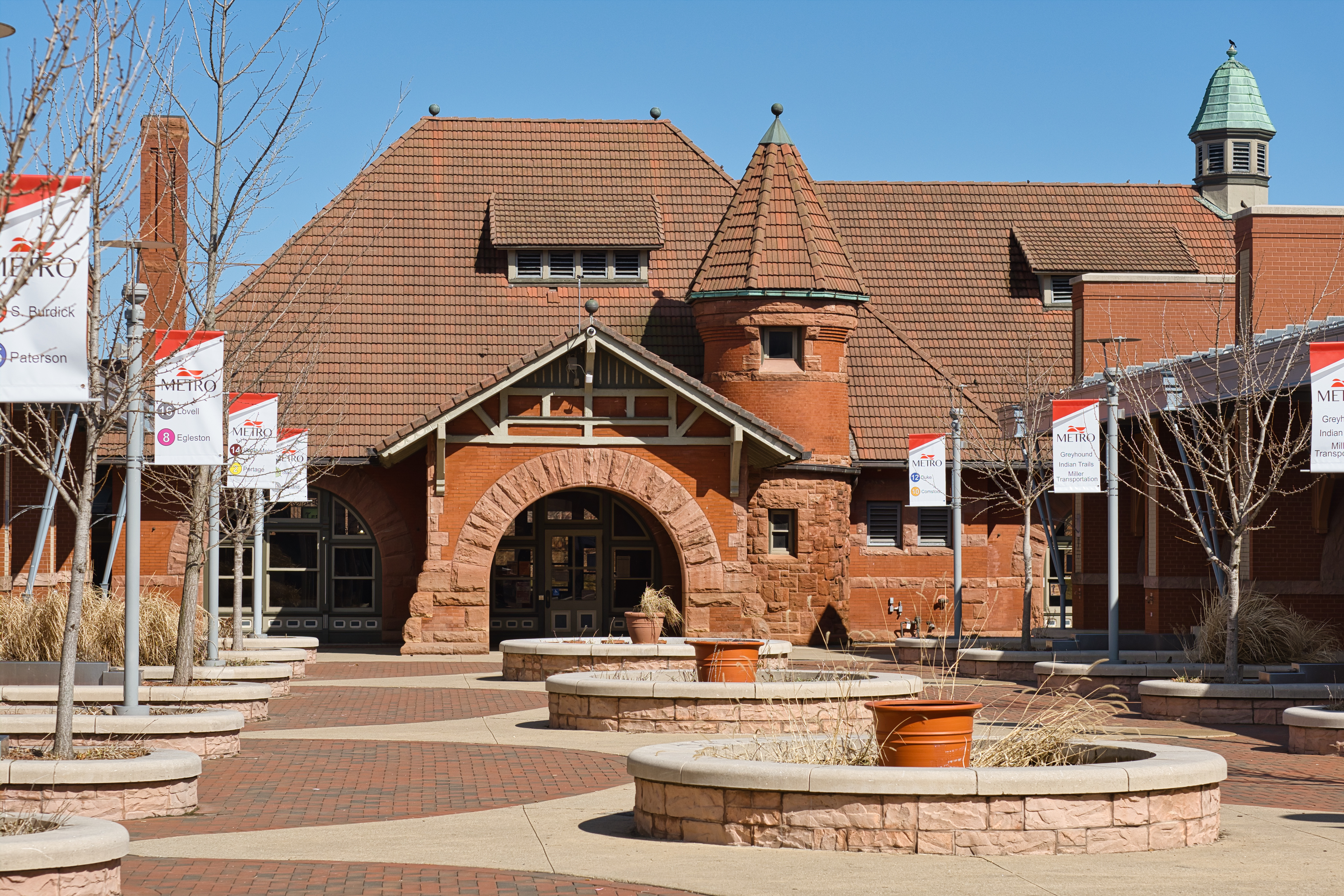
The system's main hub has been located at the Kalamazoo Transportation Center since 2005

The Kalamazoo County Transportation Authority was created in 2005 by Kalamazoo County, with the eventual goal of integrating all public transit services in the county. A countywide public transit millage was proposed in 2008, but the measure was rejected by voters. The city and the KCTA went ahead with preliminary plans to merge their transit services even without increased funding, and in 2009, Kalamazoo County's Care-A-Van rural transit service was merged with Metro Transit's Metro Van paratransit service to create the Metro County Connect service.

A state law passed in 2010 allowed Kalamazoo County to have two transportation authorities, each levying a different property tax rate. The Central County Transportation Authority was created to levy a higher property tax the urbanized areas of Kalamazoo County, including the cities of Kalamazoo and Portage. Two separate millage proposals, a lower rate for rural areas via the KCTA and a higher rate for urban areas via the CCTA, were approved by voters in August 2015. The operations of the transit system were transferred from the city of Kalamazoo to CCTA in October 2016.

=== Rebranding to "Metro" ===
Metro Transit rebranded as "Metro" in 2018. The rebranding included a new logo and a new paint scheme for buses. At the same time, the agency began an effort to study its bus stop locations, with the goal of improving passenger experience and service reliability. As part of the program, Metro removed approximately 16% of its stops, and relocated and added additional stops to better serve its passengers.

=== COVID-19 crisis and present ===
Metro suspended service on fixed-route buses from April to May 2020 during the initial stages of the COVID-19 pandemic in Michigan. Bus service resumed without Sunday service, which was not reinstated until May 2022.

Metro introduced a microtransit service in parts of its fixed-route service area in April 2024. The service is branded as Metro Link, and is operated by Via Transportation.

== Routes ==
The Kalamazoo Transportation Center serves as the primary transfer hub for Kalamazoo Metro Transit bus routes. Additional transfer points are located at the Western Michigan University main campus, The Crossroads mall in Portage, and Maple Hill Pavilion in Oshtemo Township.

No.	Name	Termini		Via	Notes
1	Westnedge	Kalamazoo Kalamazoo Transportation Center	Portage Crossroads Mall		
2	Portage	Kalamazoo Kalamazoo Transportation Center	Portage Portage Industrial Park		
3	West Michigan	Western Michigan University Main Campus	Oshtemo Maple Hill Pavilion		
4	Oakland	Kalamazoo Kalamazoo Transportation Center	Portage S. 12th St & W. Milham Av		
5	East Main	Kalamazoo Kalamazoo Transportation Center	Eastwood Eastwood Plaza		
6	Parchment	Kalamazoo Kalamazoo Transportation Center	Comstock Township Walmart, Gull Rd		
7	Alamo	Kalamazoo Kalamazoo Transportation Center	Oshtemo Maple Hill Pavilion	Kalamazoo Central High School	Some trips do not serve Kalamazoo Central High School
8	Milwood	Kalamazoo Kalamazoo Transportation Center	Portage Portage Industrial Park		Full service within Portage Industrial Park operates only during weekday peak hours
9	Gull Road	Kalamazoo Kalamazoo Transportation Center	Comstock Township Walmart, Gull Rd		
10	Comstock	Kalamazoo Kalamazoo Transportation Center	Comstock Township Meijer, Gull Rd		
11	Stadium/KVCC	Kalamazoo Kalamazoo Transportation Center	Texas Township Kalamazoo Valley Community College Texas Township Campus	Kalamazoo College	
12	Duke	Kalamazoo Kalamazoo Transportation Center	Kalamazoo/Battle Creek International Airport		
13	South Burdick	Kalamazoo Kalamazoo Transportation Center	Portage Meijer, S. Westnedge Ave	Kalamazoo Health Department	Service to Kalamazoo Health Department operates weekdays only
14	West Main	Kalamazoo Kalamazoo Transportation Center	Oshtemo Township Hall		
15	Paterson	Kalamazoo Kalamazoo Transportation Center	Woodward Av & Interfaith Blvd		Two weekday trips serve Kalamazoo Township
16	Lovell	Kalamazoo Kalamazoo Transportation Center	Oshtemo 58 West Apartments	Western Michigan University Main Campus	
19	Ring Road	Western Michigan University Main Campus	Western Michigan University College of Health & Human Services		Service suspended during WMU breaks
21	Solon-Kendall – Lafayette	Western Michigan University Main Campus	Knollwood Apartments	The Landing Apartments	Service suspended during WMU breaks
25	Parkview Campus	Western Michigan University Main Campus	Western Michigan University Parkview Campus		Service suspended during WMU breaks
26	West Centre	Portage Crossroads Mall	Portage S. 12th St & W. Milham Av		
27	East Romence	Portage Crossroads Mall	Portage Mulberry Point Apartments		

== Accidents and incidents ==
A Metro bus was involved in a serious collision on May 24, 2017. A reckless driver traveling at over 100 mph (160 km/h) on city streets crashed into the front of a Metro bus on the west side of Kalamazoo, leaving the bus driver with lifelong injuries.

On November 27, 2021, a shooting on board a Metro bus at the Kalamazoo Transportation Center injured 3 bus passengers. The shooter was killed by responding Kalamazoo Department of Public Safety officers. All 3 passengers recovered from their injuries.

== Fares ==
The standard fare for Metro fixed-route bus services is $1.50. Children under 48 in (120 cm) tall, seniors, and Medicare recipients ride for half price. Transfers are free and valid for 60 minutes. Western Michigan University students, faculty, and staff ride for free on all routes.

Metro Connect rural bus service charges a standard fare of $12, with discounts available for individuals eligible for paratransit service.

== Governance ==
Metro services are operated by the Central County Transportation Authority, a division of the Kalamazoo County government with a separate board of trustees. The Kalamazoo County Transportation Authority, also a division of the county government, funds the rural services that are provided by Metro.

From 1967 to 2016, Metro Transit services were operated by the city of Kalamazoo. The Metro bus depot and the Kalamazoo Transportation Center are owned by the city of Kalamazoo, and are leased to the CCTA for $1 per year.

As of 2012, the executive director of Metro is Sean McBride.

== See also ==
- List of bus transit systems in the United States
- Kalamazoo Transportation Center
- Battle Creek Transit
