= Michigan Line =

110-mph Amtrak and Michigan state-owned rail corridor

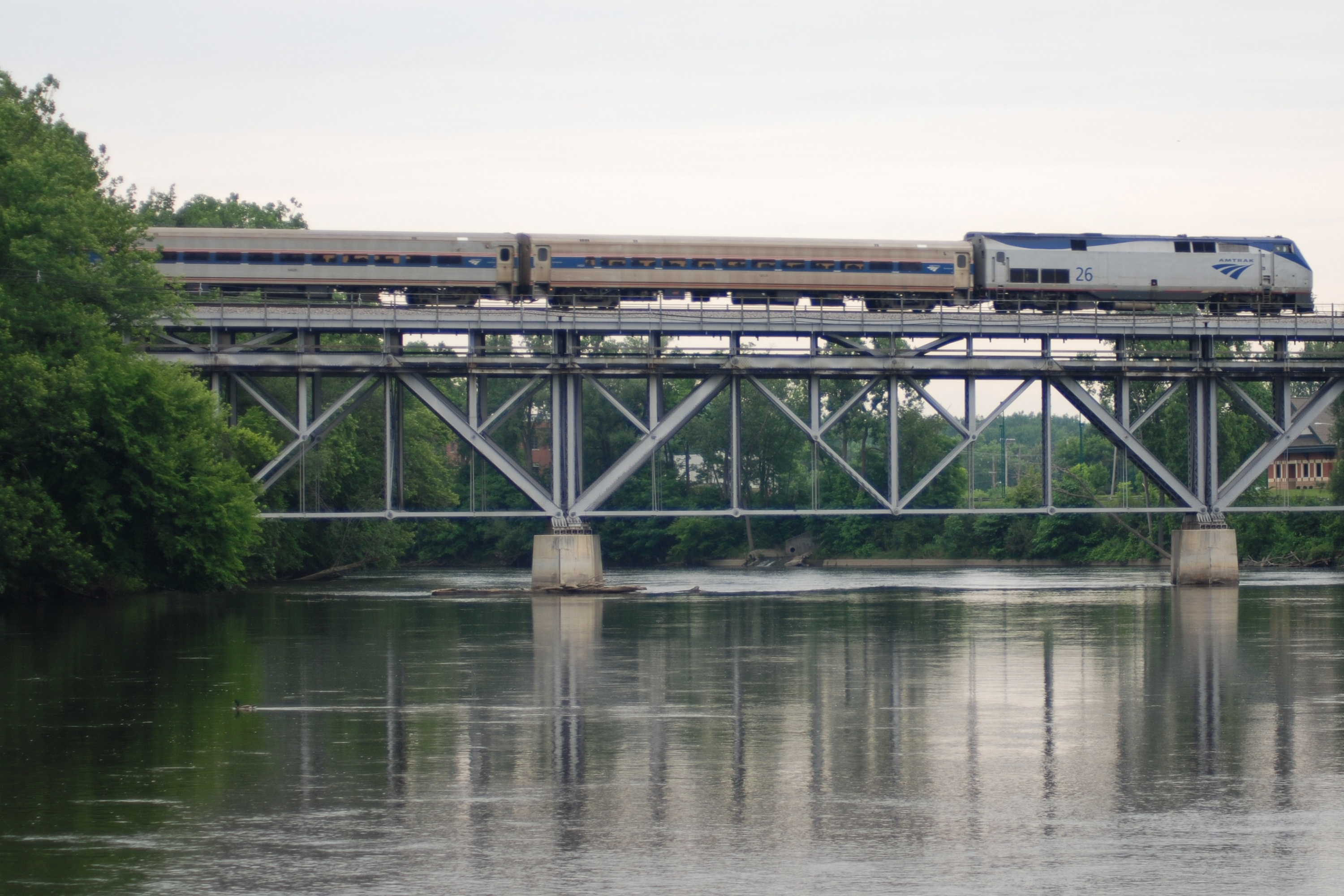
- The Wolverine crossing the St. Joseph River at Niles, Michigan in July 2009

Overview
- Status: Operating
- Owner: Amtrak (Porter–Kalamazoo); Canadian National (within Battle Creek); MDOT (Kalamazoo–Dearborn)
- Locale: Indiana and Michigan
- Termini: Porter, Indiana; Dearborn, Michigan
- Stations: 10

Service
- Type: Inter-city rail
- System: Amtrak
- Services: Blue Water, Wolverine
- Operator(s): Amtrak
- Ridership: 616,166 (FY 25) ▲2.6% (Note: Amtrak's Fiscal Year (FY) runs from October 1 of the prior year to September 30 of the named year.)

Technical
- Line length: 232 mi (373 km)
- Number of tracks: 1
- Character: Single track with passing sidings
- Track gauge: 4 ft 8 1/2 in (1,435 mm) standard gauge
- Operating speed: Up to 110 mph (180 km/h)

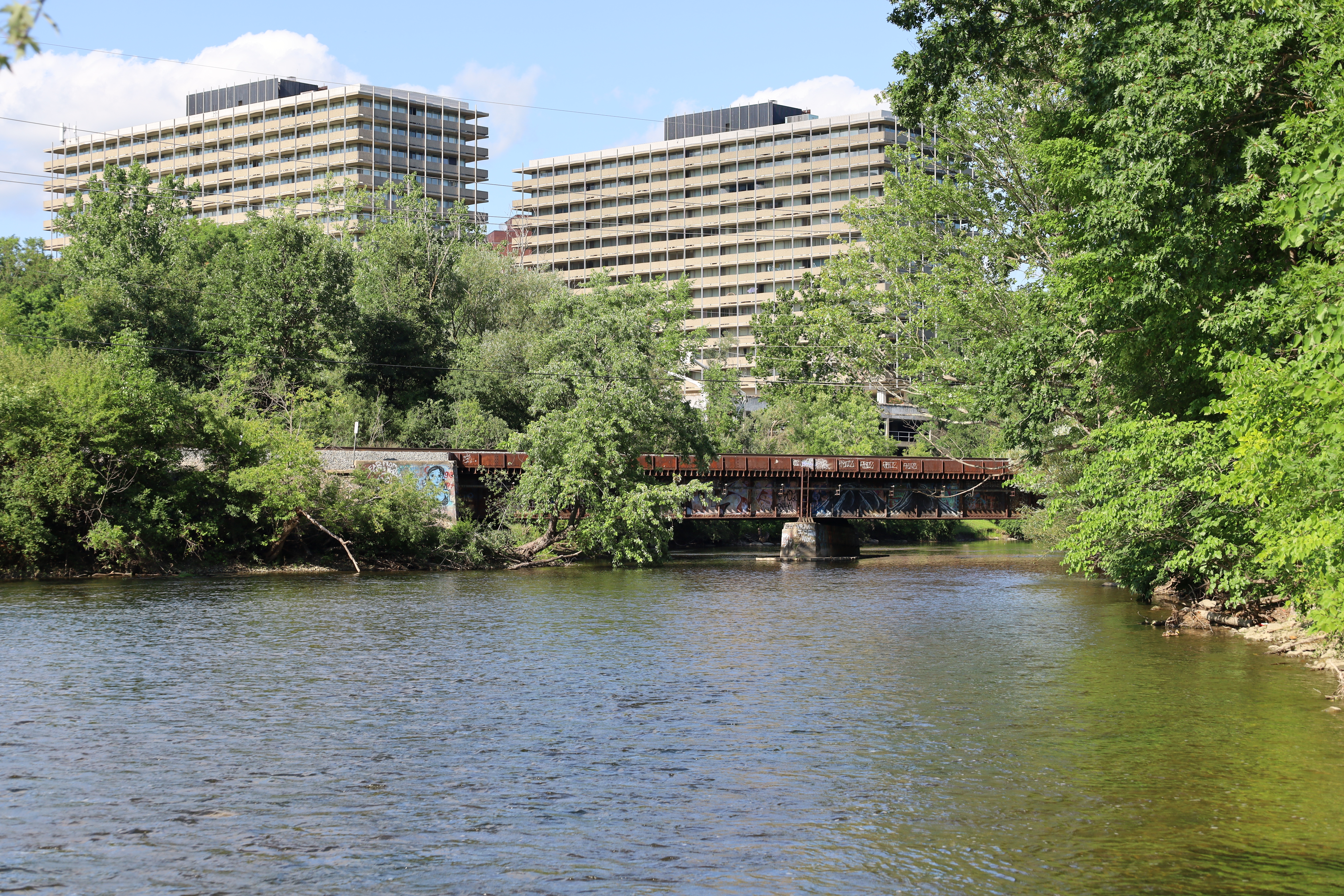
The Michigan Line crossing the Huron River in Ann Arbor, Michigan in 2023

The Michigan Line, sometimes known as the Chicago–Detroit Line, is a higher-speed rail corridor that runs between Porter, Indiana and Dearborn, Michigan. It carries Amtrak's Blue Water and Wolverine services, as well as the occasional freight train operated by Norfolk Southern.

Amtrak owns the 98-mile (158 km) section between Porter, Indiana, to Kalamazoo, Michigan, the longest stretch of Amtrak-owned rail outside of the Northeastern U.S. The state of Michigan, through the Michigan Department of Transportation (MDOT) owns the 135-mile (217 km) section between Kalamazoo and Dearborn, which it purchased from Norfolk Southern in December 2012. Norfolk Southern retains an exclusive trackage right for freight on the line. A short stretch of track in Battle Creek, Michigan is owned by Canadian National Railway. The entire line was originally the mainline of the Michigan Central Railroad.

The entire corridor (including the portion owned by MDOT) is dispatched and maintained by Amtrak, which as of September 2021, is working to replace worn tracks and integrate the train signaling and communication systems.

== History ==
In 2002, the section from Porter to Kalamazoo became the first passenger rail line in the United States to have positive train control (PTC) technology installed, specifically GE Transportation Systems' Incremental Train Control System (ITCS). In 2005, Amtrak received approval from the Federal Railroad Administration to run trains at up to 95 miles per hour (153 km/h). Most Amtrak trains outside of the Northeast are limited to 79 mph (127 km/h) due to federal regulations. Regular service at 110 mph (177 km/h) began from Porter to Kalamazoo on February 15, 2012.

In November 2011, Michigan was awarded $150 million to buy the Kalamazoo–Dearborn portion of the line from Norfolk Southern. Combined with a $196 million federal government grant announced the previous month to improve signaling and track quality, trains will be able to run at 110 mph (177 km/h) on 77% of the length of the Detroit–Chicago corridor. Before the track was purchased by MDOT, Norfolk Southern was planning to allow track degradation to occur, eventually reducing allowable speeds to 25 mph (40 km/h) for passenger trains and its eight daily round-trip freight trains. On May 25, 2021, service at 110 mph (177 km/h) began between Kalamazoo and Albion.

In October 2024, Amtrak was awarded an $8.4 million federal grant for design work to restore double track between Niles and Wayne Township.

== Incidents ==
Despite the presence of the safety system on the Michigan Line, a derailment occurred just east of Niles, Michigan, on October 21, 2012, after a Wolverine train exited the main line and entered a freight yard due to a misaligned switch. The train had a green signal and was traveling at about 60 mph (97 km/h) when it hit the switch. The incident was investigated by the National Transportation Safety Board and was found to be an Amtrak contractor's fault, caused by one of its employees improperly applying jumper wires to the signal system, bypassing safeguards that had been designed to prevent such an occurrence.
