= Lake Cities (Amtrak train) =

Former Amtrak passenger train

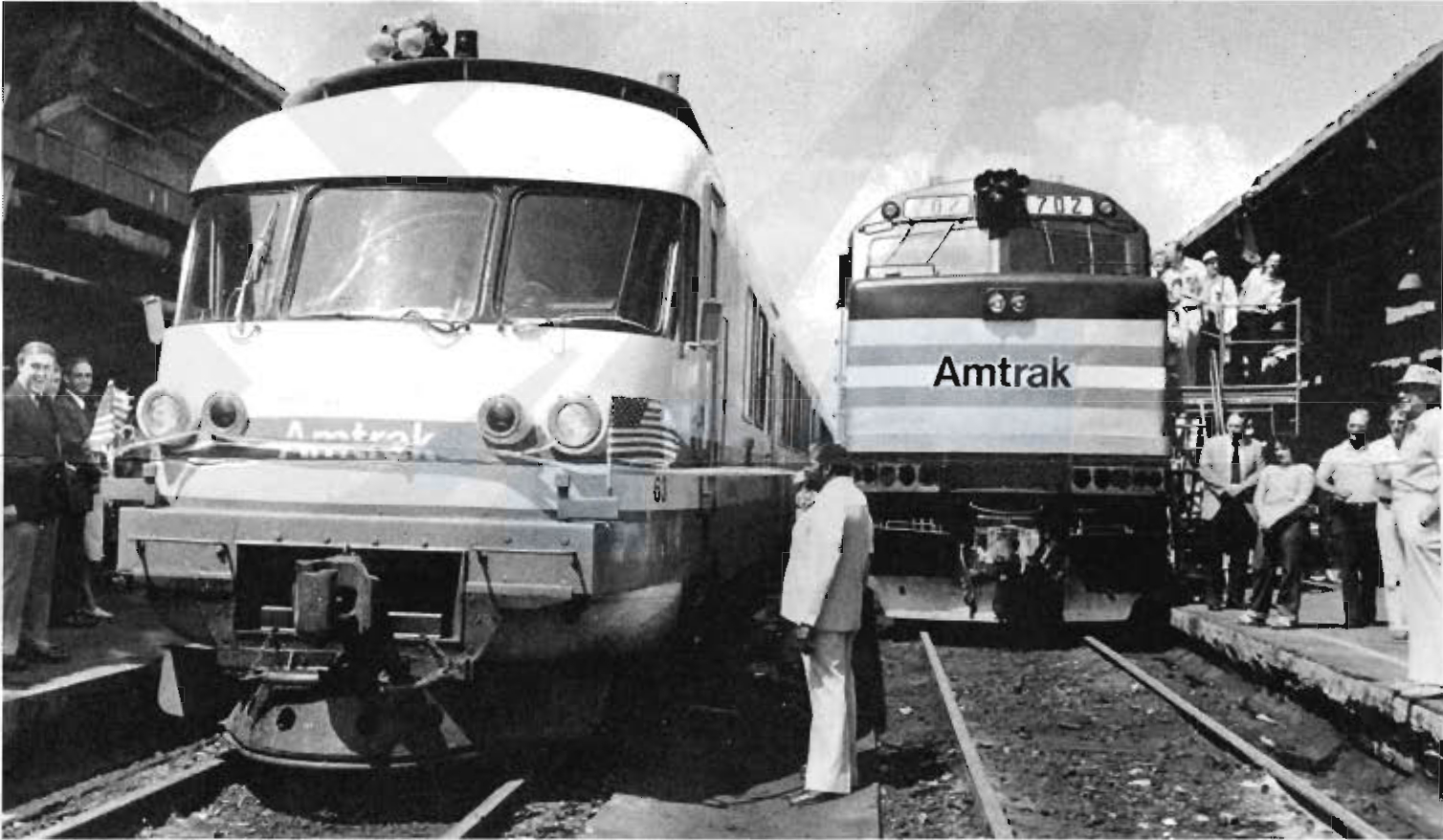
- The first westbound Lake Cities, left, arrives at Detroit

Overview
- Service type: Inter-city rail
- Status: Discontinued
- Locale: Michigan
- Predecessor: St. Clair
- First service: August 3, 1980
- Last service: April 26, 2004
- Successor: Wolverine

Route
- Termini: Chicago, Illinois; Toledo, Ohio
- Distance travelled: 335 miles (539 km)
- Average journey time: 7 hours 30 minutes

The Lake Cities was a daily passenger train operated by Amtrak between Chicago, Illinois and Toledo, Ohio via Detroit, Michigan. It operated from 1980 until 2004, when it was folded into the Wolverine. It replaced the St. Clair, a Chicago–Detroit train which operated in tandem with the Wolverine. The extension to Toledo gave travelers in Michigan the opportunity to connect with eastbound trains such as the Lake Shore Limited without backtracking to Chicago. Amtrak re-routed the train from Toledo to Pontiac, Michigan in 1995.

== History ==
The Lake Cities made its first run on August 3, 1980, using the same Turboliner equipment as its predecessor. The connection in Toledo allowed passengers traveling from Michigan to connect with the Lake Shore Limited without backtracking to Chicago. The route between Detroit and Toledo was slow; the Lake Cities required nearly two hours to travel 57 miles (92 km).

Historian Graydon Meints characterized the Toledo service as "disappointing", and Amtrak re-routed the Lake Cities to Pontiac, Michigan in 1995, mirroring the route of the Wolverine and the Twilight Limited. Amtrak estimated yearly losses on the Detroit–Toledo segment at $818,000 and called ridership "stagnant"; an Amtrak Thruway bus runs in its place.

=== Proposed restoration ===
Amtrak proposed to restore the Lake Cities to Toledo as part of its network growth strategy in the late 1990s but ultimately cancelled the project. As of 2016 it is still not possible to travel by train to or from Michigan without passing through Chicago's Union Station. On April 26, 2004, Amtrak dropped the individual names for the Chicago–Detroit–Pontiac trains, naming them all the "Wolverine."

The Ohio Rail Development Commission proposed restoring service to the Detroit–Toledo corridor as part of its "Ohio Hub" initiative. Under the plan, Detroit would be connected to Ohio by a Detroit–Toledo–Cleveland service (eight trains daily) and potentially also a Detroit–Toledo–Columbus service (eight trains daily).
