= Mogo (disambiguation) =

Mogo is a fictional DC Comics character.

Mogo may also refer to:

== Places ==
- Mogo, New South Wales, Australia, a small heritage town
- Mogo Creek, New South Wales
- Mogo, Chad, a sub-prefecture of Chari-Baguirmi Region

== Other uses ==
- Mogo (company), a Canadian finance company
- Mogo Wheelchairs, Australian manufacturer of sporting wheelchairs
- MoGo, a non-profit bicycle-sharing system in Detroit
- HK Mogo, a top-tier ice hockey team based in Riga, Latvia
- Music of Ghanaian Origin (MOGO), a music festival in Ghana, started in 2007
- "Mogo?", a song on the album Wow 2 by Japanese experimental band Boredoms
- MoGo, a computer Go program
- Mogo, one of the first two recorded Australian Aboriginal trackers
- Mogo, a local name for Ugali, a cornmeal mush
- Mogo, the Great Western Railway telegraphic code for a covered motor car wagon

== See also ==
- Isla Mogo Mogo, an island of Panama
- Mogoș, a commune in Transylvania, Romania
