= Detroit Bus Station =

Intercity bus station in Detroit, Michigan

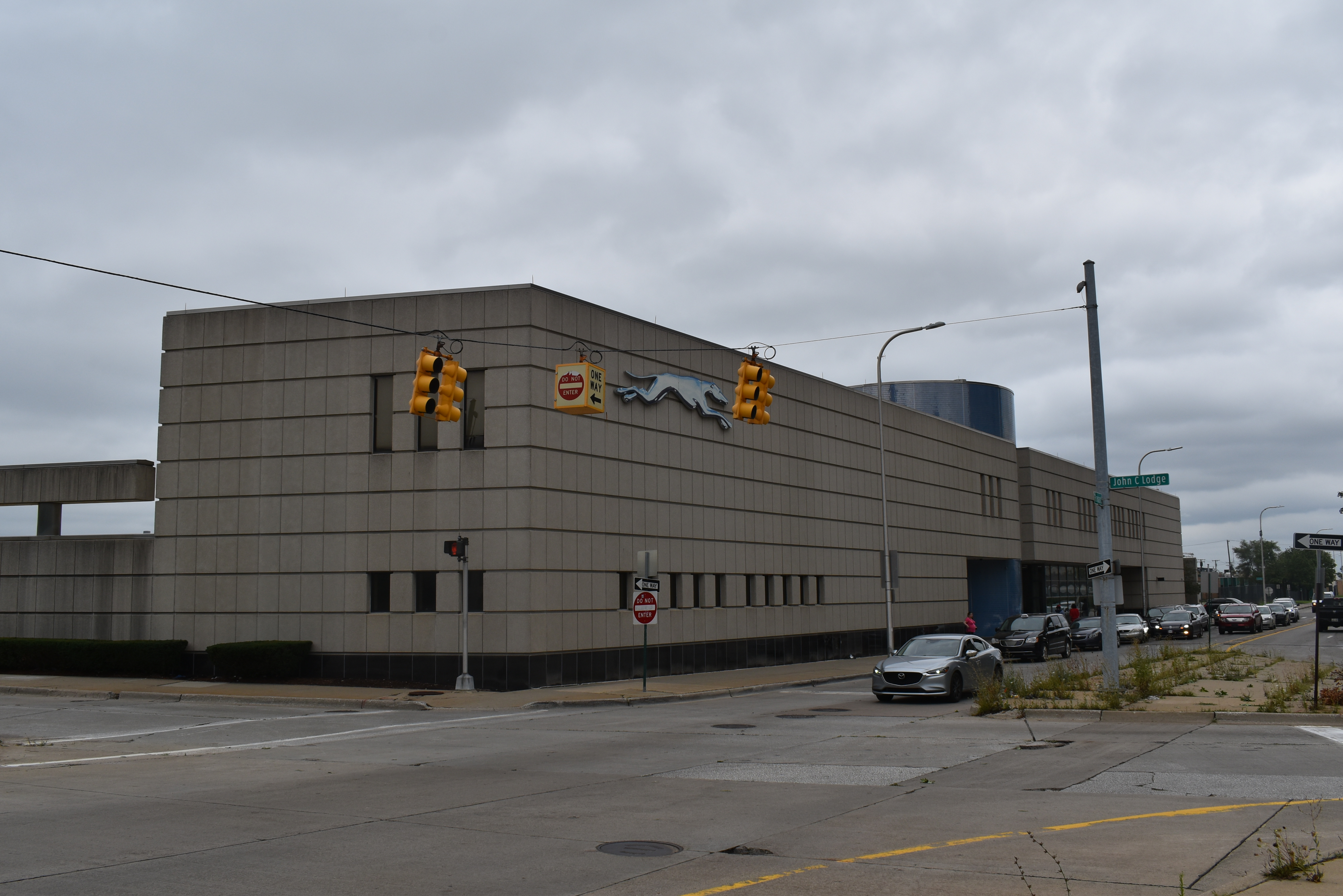
- The station in August 2023

General information
- Location: 1001 Howard Street, Detroit, Michigan
- Coordinates: 42.327961°N 83.058434°W
- Owner: MDOT
- Operator: Greyhound Lines
- Bus operators: Barons Bus Lines; Flixbus; Greyhound Lines; Indian Trails
- Connections: DDOT 1, 19, 27, 29; MoGo

Construction
- Architect: William Kessler

Other information
- Website: Official website

History
- Opened: October 24, 1991

Passengers
- 1,000 daily
Location
- Location within Michigan Location within the United States

The Detroit Bus Station is an intercity bus station in the Corktown neighborhood of Detroit, Michigan. The station, managed by Greyhound Lines, also serves Barons Bus Lines, Flixbus and Indian Trails. The current building was constructed in 1991.

Detroit has seen intercity bus transit since the 1920s, when a union bus terminal opened on Grand River Avenue. In 1937, a Greyhound Lines bus terminal opened on Grand River Avenue, which would be in operation until 1958. In 1958, this station was replaced by another Greyhound terminal, built in the mid-century modern style on Congress Street. When the 1958 terminal opened, it was celebrated for bringing a modern terminal to a central location, however, it would later gain a negative reputation. The current bus station was opened in 1991 and is planned to be replaced as of 2023.

== Attributes ==
The Greyhound station building sits in the Corktown neighborhood, taking up half a city block. The terminal is bordered by Howard St to the northwest, and Sixth St and John C Lodge Service Dr to the southwest and northeast. The main entrance is located on Howard Street.

The bus station, owned by MDOT and managed by Greyhound Lines, also serves Barons Bus Lines, Flixbus, and Indian Trails. As of 2019, the Greyhound station saw about 49 buses and 1,000 passengers per day.

== History ==
=== Early stations ===
The first intercity bus station in Detroit was the Union Bus Terminal, which opened in the 1920s at 502 West Grand River Ave. Until the construction of the first Greyhound Terminal in 1937, this was the primary point of departure for buses in Detroit. This first Greyhound terminal took eight months to construct, opening for service on May 4, 1937, at the northwest corner of Washington Boulevard and Grand River Avenue. Upon opening, it was considered the largest and most modern bus terminal in the country. The terminal was used by 600 buses every day, operated by Greyhound, Blue Goose, Great Lakes, Eastern Michigan and Red Star Lines.

In 1958, a new Greyhound bus terminal opened at 130 East Congress Street. The new terminal was designed by the Louisville, Kentucky–based firm Arrasmith & Tyler in the mid-century modern style, and included a 600 space parking facility on the roof. The terminal opened on December 16, 1958, after a three-day celebration. It was expected to serve 224 daily buses and 3 million passengers a year. By the 1980s however, the shine had worn off, and the facility had become rundown. It was purchased in 1989 for redevelopment as an office tower, leading Greyhound to search for a new location.

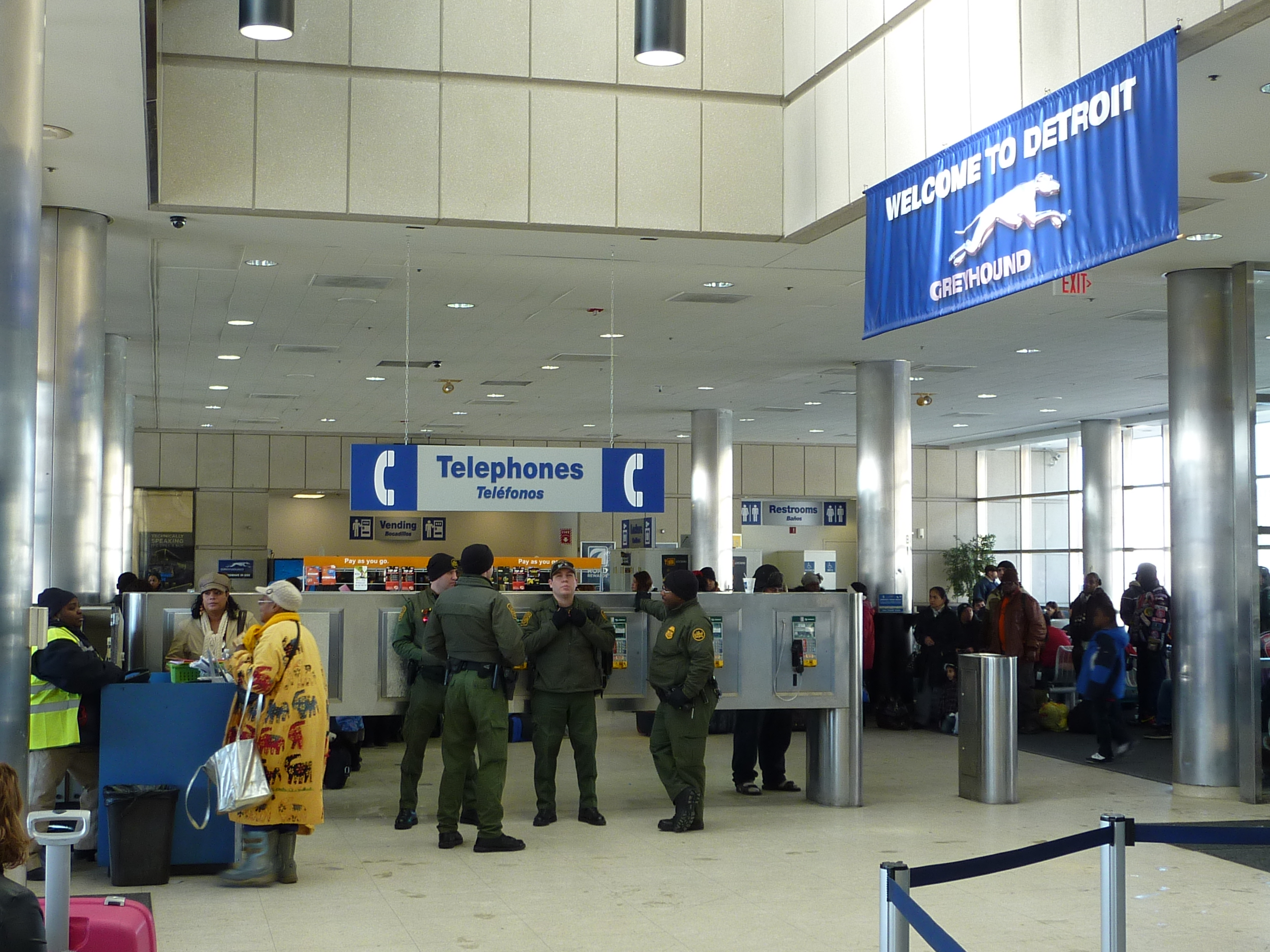
The interior

=== Current station ===
Greyhound began running service from 1000 West Lafayette Blvd on October 4, 1989, while the search continued for a permanent location. The state of Michigan committed $5.9 million toward a new facility while the search continued. Eventually, Greyhound decided on a site off the Lodge Freeway in Corktown.

The new terminal opened on October 24, 1991, with the first bus leaving for Chicago. The two-story facility was designed by William Henry Kessler. The Michigan Department of Transportation owns the structure, while Greyhound pays a lease of $700 per month.

In 2019, MDOT notified Greyhound of the termination of the lease on October 13. MDOT intended to sell the property for redevelopment, indicating that multiple unsolicited bids for the property had been received. Greyhound was given the option of using the Detroit Amtrak station, which was already planned to be reconstructed as an intermodal facility within a few years. However, due to the limited space at the station, Greyhound and MDOT resolved to continue use of the bus terminal until the intermodal facility could be completed.

As of 2023, the Amtrak station is planned to be replaced with a $57 million intermodal facility on Baltimore Street. This would provide space for Amtrak, intercity buses, bikeshare, ridesharing services and possibly retail or residential space. All intercity bus service in the city would move to a 12 berth building at the new location, leading to the closure of the current Greyhound station on Howard Street.

== See also ==
- Transportation in Detroit
- Detroit station (future location of intercity bus service)
