= Joseph Campau Street =

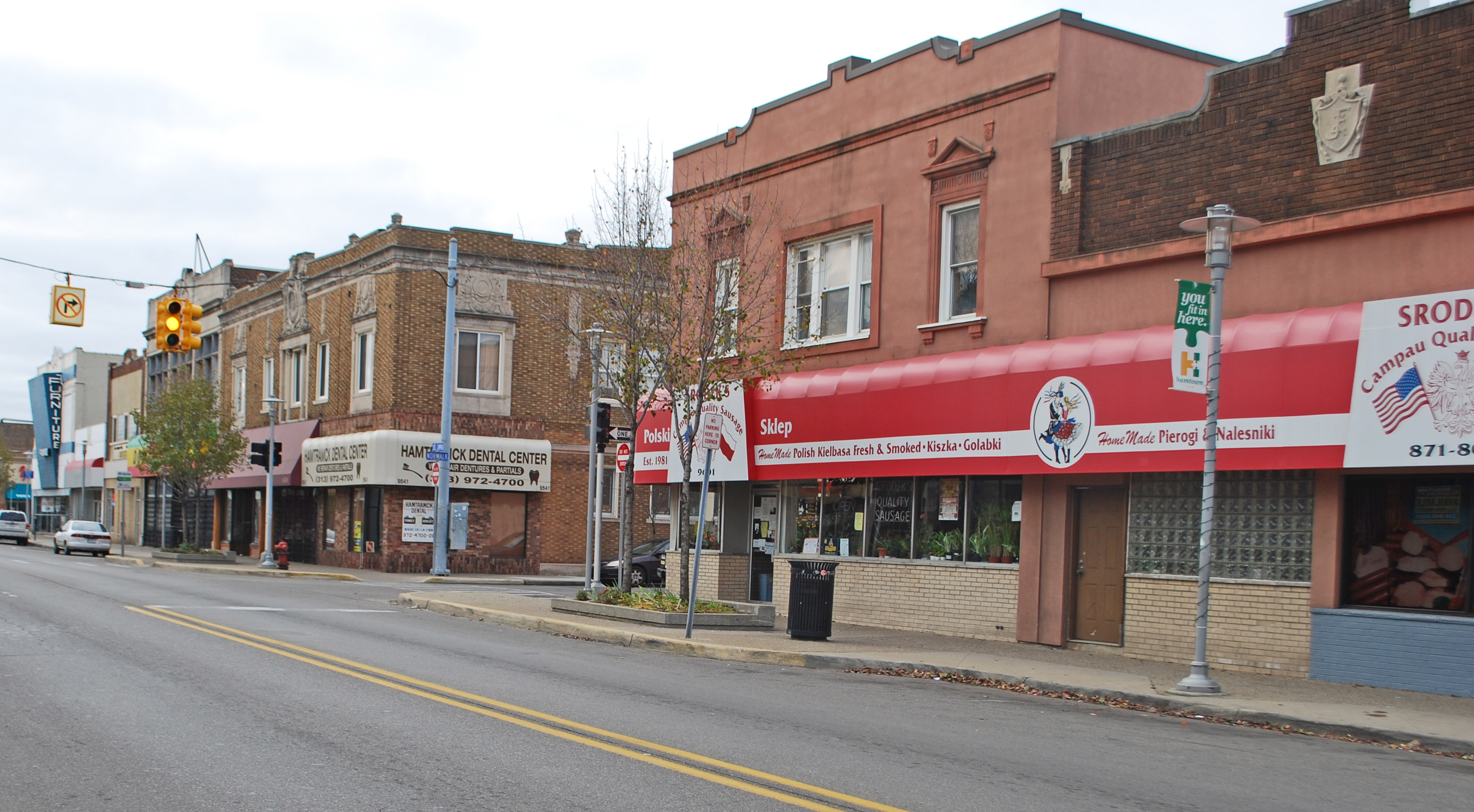
- Jos Campau Street at Norwalk
- Length: 5.3 mi (8.5 km)
- South end: Talon Centre Drive in Detroit
- Major junctions: M-3 in Detroit; I-94 in Detroit (no interchange); M-8 in Detroit (no interchange)
- North end: Conant and Brentwood Streets in Detroit

Joseph Campau Street, also known as Joseph Campau Avenue, is a city street in Hamtramck and Detroit in the southeastern part of the U.S. state of Michigan. Jos. Campau Historic District is located along the street in Hamtramck. Along Joseph Campau Street and the Detroit River are River Place and The Roberts Riverwalk Hotel and Residence Detroit.

Joseph Campau Street has a unique collection of buildings in southeast Michigan reflecting early 20th century commercial architecture. It is adjacent to a dense neighborhood of single-family homes having a strong, cultural community focus. It retains an atmosphere of a small town and viable main street.

== Joseph Campau ==
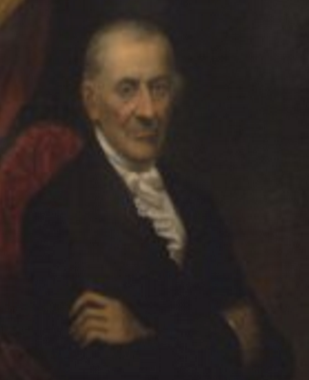
Joseph Campau (1769-1863) was the grandson of one of the original settlers to Fort Detroit and became the state's first millionaire through his real estate endeavors

The street is named for Joseph Campau (February 2, 1769 – July 23, 1863) who was among Detroit, Michigan's leading citizens and wealthiest landowners at the dawn of the 19th century. He made millions in the real estate industry and served in several public offices for the city. Campau held multiple public office positions in Detroit. He was City Trustee in 1802, City Treasurer, City Inspector of water barrels and City Assessor, appraiser, and over-seer of the poor. In 1802, he was an original trustee of Detroit and its incorporation.

== Jos. Campau Historic District ==
The Jos. Campau Historic District is a commercial historic district located along Joseph Campau Street in Hamtramck. The district runs from roughly Holbrook and Lehman Streets on the south to Pulaski and Casmere Streets on the north. It was listed on the National Register of Historic Places in 2012.

In 1901, a portion of Hamtramck township centered around Jos. Campau Street was incorporated as a village. People, many of them Polish, flooded into the area when a Dodge Brothers Motor Car Company plant called Dodge Main was completed in 1914 at the southeast corner of the village.

Most of the stores along Joseph Campau Street opened in the 1920s. The surrounding neighborhoods were densely packed single-family homes, and this section of street quickly became the second busiest shopping district in southeast Michigan, after only downtown Detroit.

== Riverwalk Hotel Detroit ==
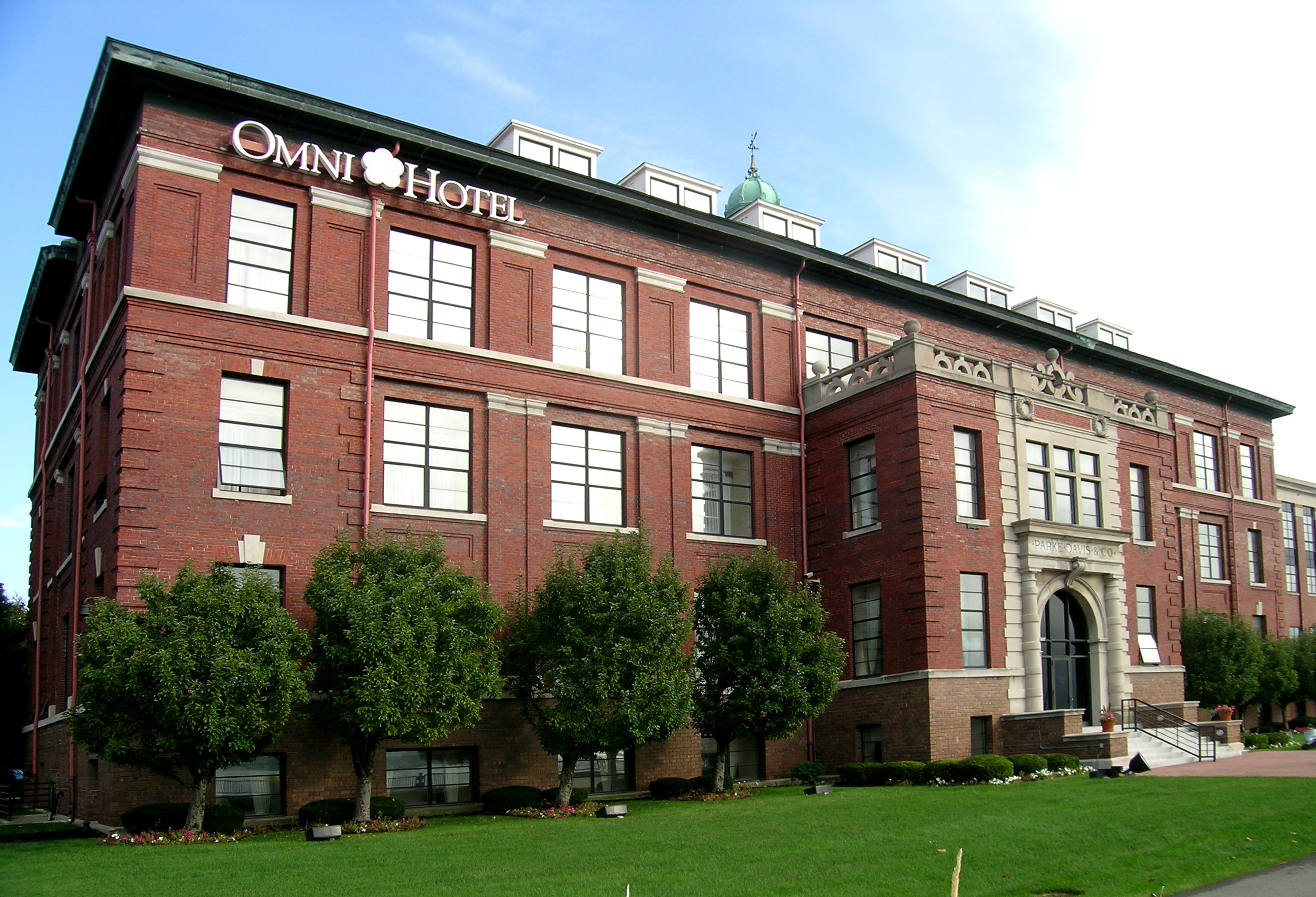
Roberts Riverwalk Hotel Detroit

The Roberts Riverwalk Hotel and Residence Detroit is located on Joseph Campau Street at the Detroit River. The former Parke-Davis Research Laboratory, designated a National Historic Landmark, was redeveloped as a boutique luxury hotel located on the Detroit International Riverfront.

== River Place ==
The historic River Place, also known as Stroh River Place, is bounded by Joseph Campau Street, Wight Street, McDougall Street, and the Detroit International Riverfront.

== Gallery ==
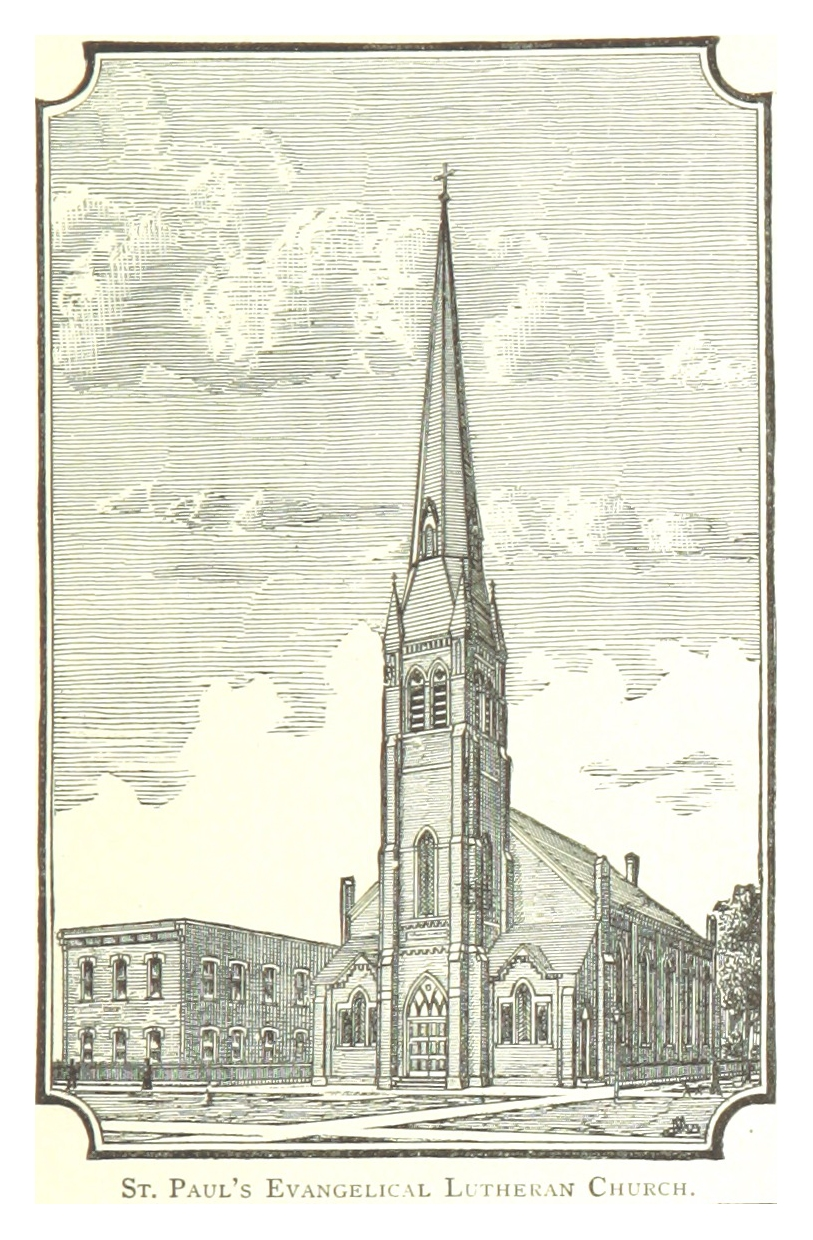
St. Paul's Evangelical Lutheran Church

== See also ==
- Transportation in metropolitan Detroit
