= Badu (surname) =

Badu is a surname or title found in various regions of Asia and Africa.

== History ==
The surname बडू is found in the Brahmin community in the far western region of Nepal mainly in the Darchula, doti and Baitadi districts,Kanchanpur, Dhangadhi, also in Gorkha district eastern part of Nepal .Also in eastern regions of Indian states like West Bengal, Odisha, Chhattisgarh & Jharkhand which are unrelated to one found in Nepal. An unrelated surname is found in Ghana. It may also be a first name.

In modern times, in the Lingaraja Temple of Bhubaneswar, Odisha priests belonged to three communities, namely Pujapanda Nijog, Brahman Nijog and Badu Nijog out of which the Badu are non-Brahmin servant groups [section of the Kshatriya (क्षत्रिय)] while they are described as Vadu in chapter 62 of the Ekamrapurana. The caste group of Badu is called Niyoga, which elects the officers every year during the Sandalwood festival. Every Badu undergoes three distinct rites, namely, ear-piercing, marriage, and god-touching. Historically, the Badu's performed five different temple duties - Paliabadu and Pharaka, which were considered important and Pochha, Pahada and Khataseja, which were considered inferior. From 1962, only Paliabadu and Pharaka practises are followed and the others are discontinued. The Badus also carry out ablution and dressing of the images of Siddhaganesh and Gopalini.

== Notable people ==
Notable people with the surname include:

- Alfred Badu, French equestrian who competed at the 1920 Olympics
- Awurama Badu (1945–2017), Ghanaian highlife musician
- Bastian Badu (born 2000), French footballer
- Benjamin Agyeman-Badu (born 1998), British-Ghanaian footballer
- Dilendra Prasad Badu (born 1954), Nepalese politician
- Emmanuel Agyemang-Badu (born 1990), Ghanaian footballer
- Erykah Badu (professional name of Erica Abi Wright, born 1971), American singer/songwriter, record producer, and actress
- Kofi Badu, 20th-century Ghanaian newspaper editor, politician and government minister
- Malcolm Badu (born 1997), German footballer
- Yaa Ntiamoah Badu, Ghanaian zoologist, environmental specialist, academic and management expert

== See also ==
- Antonio Badú
