= Carta Worldwide =

Software company in Canada

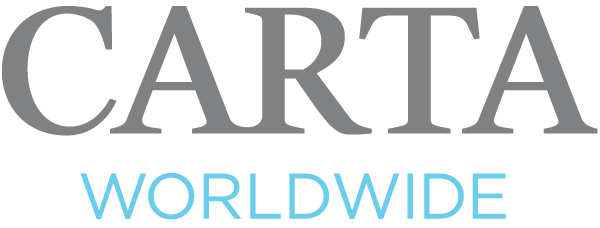
- Type: Subsidiary
- Industry: Financial services
- Founded: 2006
- Headquarters: Toronto, Ontario, Canada
- Area served: Worldwide
- Key people: Peter Kaju (CEO), Giles Sutherland (CRO), Richard Wray (CCO), Adil Benlamlih (CTO)
- Products: Merchant services, prepaid solutions,Transaction processing, Host card emulation, Cloud and Secure Element, Tokenization (data security).
- Number of employees: 75 (2020)
- Parent: Mogo
- Website: www.cartaworldwide.com

Carta Worldwide is a Canadian financial technology company that offers digital payments technology and modern card issuer processing for banks and financial technology "fintech" companies. In addition to their Canadian headquarters in Toronto, Carta has offices in London, Casablanca, and Charlottetown, PEI. Carta operates internationally, providing financial technology and digital payment software and cloud API issuer processing.

Carta's clients include Vodafone, PayPal, Banco Sabadell, Westpac NZ, and Novum Bank, nets, TransferWise, and Sodexo. The company also partners with Visa and MasterCard.

Carta was the world's first processor to complete integration to MasterCard MOTAPS, enabling rapid deployment for NFC programs. Their Charlottetown, PEI, data centre is the only secure third party issuer processing data host for financial services in Canada.

Carta was part of the development team that produced ApplePay and was the first processor in the world to perform an ApplePay transaction.

== History ==
Carta was founded in 2006 in Canada by Frank Svatousek, Robert Elensky, and Rui Mendes. Company's headquarters were set up in Oakville, Ontario, Canada and relocated in to Switzerland with service company offices opened in Hong Kong and London, UK.

In 2009, Brian Semkiw was appointed as CEO. Brian Semkiw is the co-founder of Rand Worldwide which had 1500 employees and had secured revenues of approximately $500 million by the time it was privatized in 2007. Profit Magazine named Semkiw "Entrepreneur of the Year" in 1996.

On September 15, 2014, Carta Worldwide closed the first tranche of a $12 million Series D venture round. Led by Toronto-based merchant bank Difference Capital and DC Thomson (UK), the $7-million investment adds to the more than $50 million the company has invested in its digital transaction processing platform.

In 2015 Carta partnered with Visa Inc. and Vodafone to enable contactless bank card payments. The Vodafone wallet uses a hybrid of a hardware SIM card and cloud-based tokenization. Carta Worldwide enabled groundbreaking digital payments launch that allowed PayPal accounts to transact across Visa network in Europe. Also in 2015, Carta Worldwide has named Elizabeth Duke as new Vice President of Business Development.

In July 2018, Carta Worldwide announced that Brian Semkiw resigned as CEO issuing in a change in global leadership, with Paul Hill appointed as the new CEO. After Paul Hill leaves to begin the next phase of his life, Peter Kaju assumes role as Chief Executive Officer June 1, 2020.

In January 2021, Carta Worldwide was acquired by Mogo for $24 million CAD in stock.

== Management ==
- Allan Smith - Head of Carta Worldwide
- Giles Sutherland - Chief Revenue Officer
- Richard Wray - Chief Customer Officer
- Adil Benlamlih - Chief Technology Officer
- Peter Kaju - Ex-Chief Executive Officer

Richard Wray left Carta Worldwide in early 2023, and has since been working for CLOWD9 Ltd since September 2023.

== Awards ==
Year	Nominee / work	Award	Result
2013	Carta Worldwide - NFC Virtual Prepaid Platform	Best Virtual Campaign - Payment Exchange Prepaid & Payments Awards	Won
2014	Carta Worldwide	Best Contactless Solution - Emerging Payment Awards	Won
2014	Carta Worldwide	Best Payment Technological Innovation - Emerging Payment Awards	Nominated
2014	PayWith, Carta Worldwide	Best Virtual or Mobile Program - Payments Exchange Prepaid & Payment Awards	Won
2014	Carta Worldwide Host Card Emulation (HCE) with Remote Secure Element (RSE) for NFC	Best Prepaid & Payments Innovation - Payments Exchange Prepaid & Payment Awards	Nominated
2014	Bread4Scrap - Payment Card Solutions (Carta Worldwide)	Boundary Buster - PayBefore Awards Europe	Won
2015	DCR Strategies - TruCash Wallet (MasterCard & Carta Worldwide)	Breakout Company of the Year - PayBefore Awards	Won
2015	DCR Strategies - TruCash Wallet (MasterCard & Carta Worldwide)	Gotta-Have Mobile App of the Year - PayBefore Awards	Won
2015	By The Booth - Carta Worldwide (Mobile Payments Commercial)	Marketing (Product) Video - AVA Digital Awards (Platinum)	Won
2015	By The Booth - Carta Worldwide (Mobile Payments Commercial)	Marketing (Product) Video - Hermes Creative Awards (Platinum)	Won
2015	Carta Worldwide	Contactless Bank Card Payments enabled on Vodafone Wallet (Oct 2015)	Nominated
2015	Raphaels Bank, Carta Worldwide, Visa, Vodafone	Mobile Payments Solution of the Year - Payments Awards (Nov 2015)	Nominated
2015	Raphaels Bank, Carta Worldwide, Visa, Vodafone	Best Contactless Payments Project - Payments Awards (Nov 2015)	Nominated
