= Transportation in metropolitan Detroit =

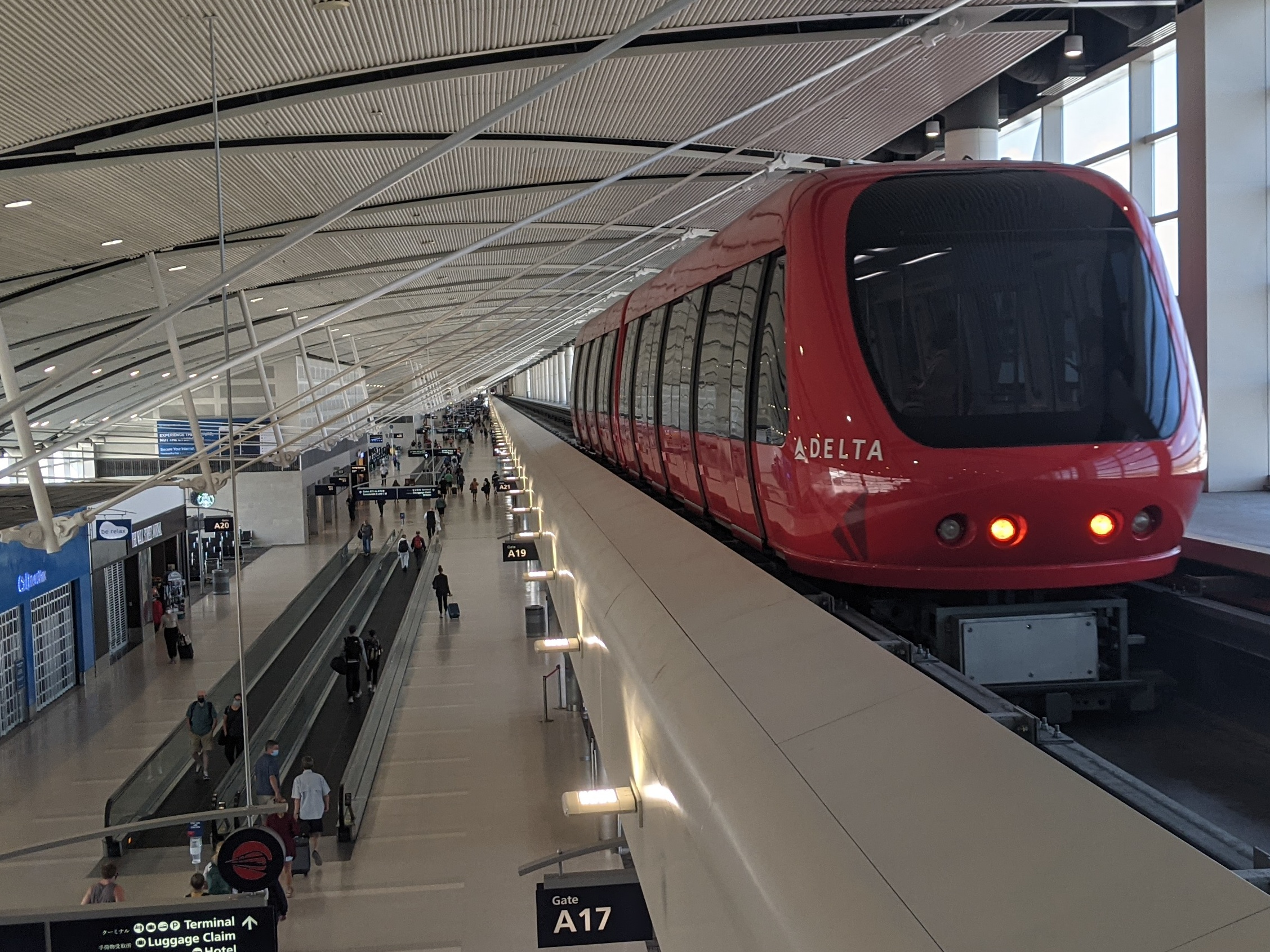
Detroit Metropolitan Airport is the region's major international airport. The ExpressTram is used to transport passengers.

Transportation in metropolitan Detroit comprises an expansive system of roadways, multiple public transit systems, a major international airport, freight railroads, and ports. Located on the Detroit River along the Great Lakes Waterway, Detroit is a significant city in international trade, with two land crossings to Canada. Three primary Interstate highways serve the region.

== History ==
=== 1805–1928 ===
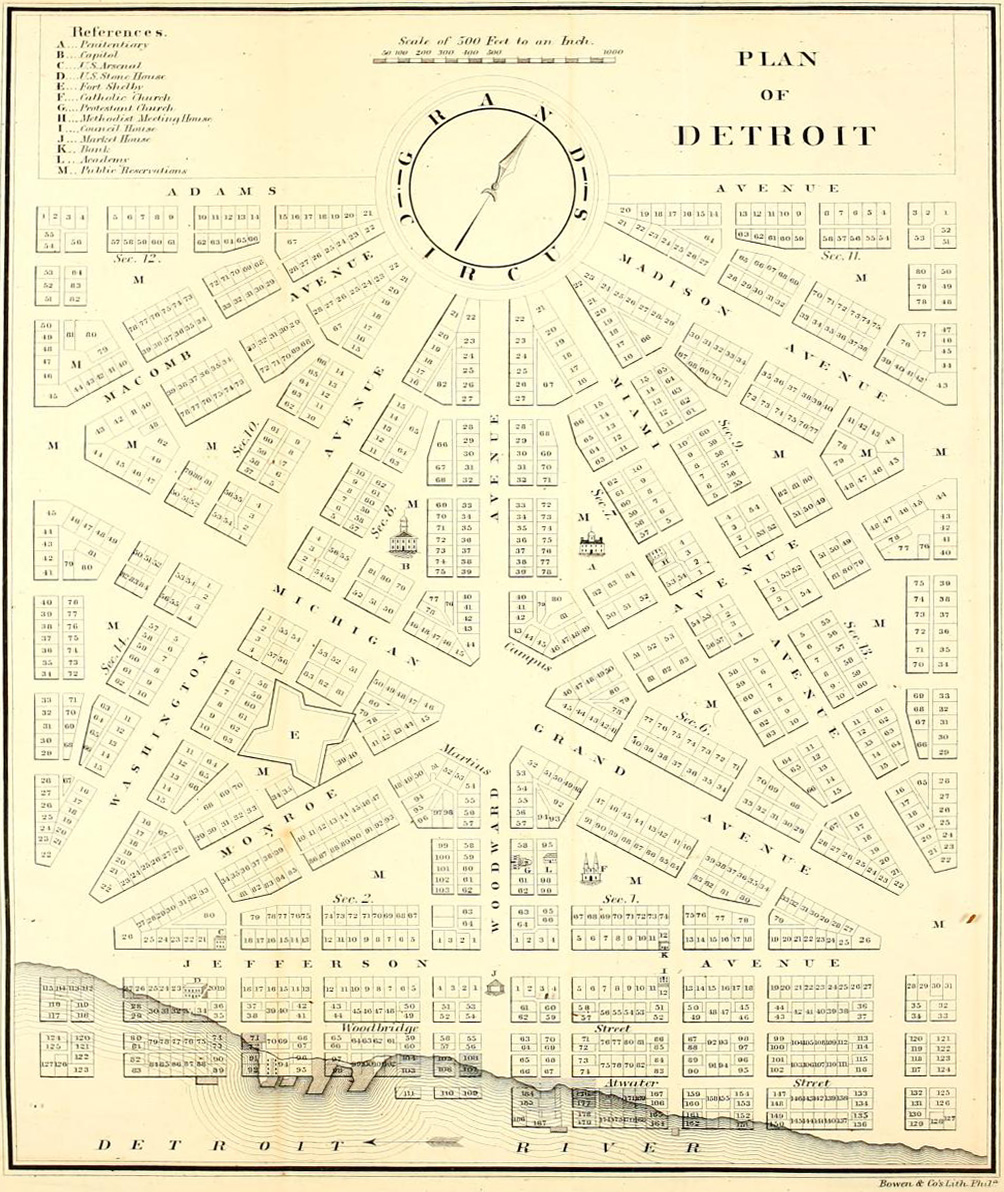
Augustus Woodward's plan following the 1805 fire for Detroit's baroque-styled radial avenues and Grand Circus Park

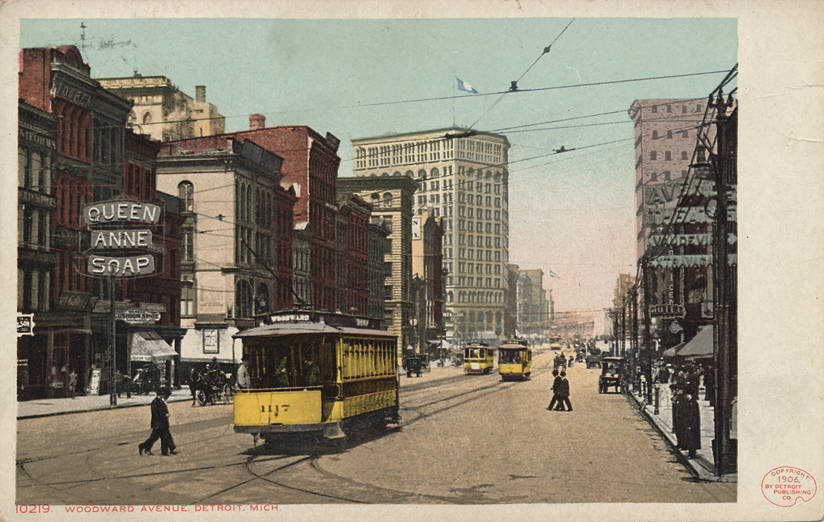
Streetcars on Woodward Avenue, circa 1900s

The period from 1800 to 1929 was one of considerable growth of the city, from 1,800 people in 1820 to 1.56 million in 1930 (2.3 million for the metropolitan area). During this period, a new road system had been created in 1805, a regional rail network was constructed, a thriving streetcar network developed and an emerging global motorcar industry was established in the city.

In 1805, five new radial avenues (Woodward, Michigan, Grand River, Gratiot, and Jefferson) were constructed in the city as part of a new city plan drawn up by Augustus Woodward following a devastating fire in the city earlier the same year.

Over land the Sauk Trail, a Native American trail which ran through Michigan, Illinois and Indiana, connected Detroit with Sauk Village, Illinois, and Chicago; in 1820 it was described as a 'plain horse path, which is considerably traveled by traders, hunters, and others' but one which not possible for someone unfamiliar with the route to follow without a guide.

Congress passed an act to construct a new Chicago Road from Detroit to supply Fort Dearborn in Chicago; surveying began in 1825 however financial shortfalls resulted in the road mostly following the path of the Sauk Trail which military couriers were already using. By 1835, daily stage coach departures run by the Western Stage Company traveled all the way from Chicago to Detroit on a multi-day trip whose travel time was dependent on how bad the road was at the particular season.

The Erie Canal, which had first been proposed in 1807, opened in 1825 and greatly improved access to Detroit and other Michigan ports from Europe and the eastern seaboard. From Detroit, settlers were able to use the Chicago Road and other land routes. Land sales in Detroit reached a peak in that year with 92,232 acres (373.25 km^{2}) being sold.

A charter for the Detroit and Pontiac Railroad was granted in 1830 to link Detroit with Pontiac; however, it was not until 1843 that the line was completed and operation started from a station at Jefferson and Woodward Avenue. Plans for a railway line to St. Joseph, Michigan and then on to Chicago by boat were outlined in 1830, and after a number of funding problems, the line reached Dexter ten years later and Kalamazoo, Michigan in 1846 when the Michigan Central Railroad was formed to progress the work faster and replace faulty rails that had already installed. The new company decided to create a line all the way to Chicago (via New Buffalo rather than St. Joseph), which they completed by 1852.

In January 1863, a Syracuse, New York-based firm gave a $5,000 deposit which created the Detroit City Railway Company, which was followed by an ordinance which was passed in May 1863 awarded a 30-year franchise to the DCRC for the construction of a horse-drawn streetcar system in the city; construction started in June and services were available to the public starting August 4 on Jefferson (from the Michigan Central depot at 3rd to Elmwood Street), August 27 on Woodward (from Jefferson to Adams), September 12 on Gratiot (to Russell Street) and November 25 on Michigan (to Thompson Street (later 12th Street, now Rosa Parks Boulevard)) (note: west of 8th Street, Michigan Avenue was named Chicago Road until 1867). By the end of the year, services were operating along Jefferson (which had been extended on October 1 to the then-city limits at Mount Elliott), Woodward (extended in October to Alexandrine Street), Gratiot and Michigan. Other companies were also established on other streets (the first being the Fort Street & Elmwood Avenue Railway Company which operated the city's first crosstown car line from the then-city limits west of Porter Road (present-day 24th Street), to downtown along Fort Street, then out along Michigan Grand Avenue (present-day Cadillac Square), Randolph and Croghan Street (present-day Monroe Street) to the Elmwood Cemetery) and business was brisk, by 1875; the Detroit City Railway Company alone carried 2.9 million passengers on their four lines. The first electric streetcars started operation on September 1, 1886, along Dix Street (present-day West Vernor Highway) from 24th Street to Livernois Avenue (which was now along the western city limits) and the last horse-drawn trams on November 9, 1895, on the Chene Street line, in which the car was literally stripped down to its trucks. In 1880, the Grand Trunk Western Railroad was formed to provide a new route to Chicago through lower Michigan.

Work started on the construction of the 12-mile-long (19 km) U-shaped Grand Boulevard road around the city in 1883 which was completed in 1891. The entire length was decorated with trees, shrubbery, and flowerbeds. Originally, the roadway was supposed to run through the then-rural outskirts of Detroit near its borders with Springwells, Greenfield and Hamtramck townships, between East Jefferson in Hamtramck Township and West Jefferson in Springwells Township.

Henry Ford tested his new Quadricycle, a gasoline-powered motor car, in Detroit on June 4, 1896.

On New Year's Eve 1900, the Detroit Citizen's Street Railway, Detroit, Fort Wayne and Belle Isle Railway, Detroit Electric Railway and Detroit Suburban Railway merged to form the Detroit United Railway, as a result for the first time since 1865 all streetcar lines in the Detroit area were operated by one company and by August 1901 it had begun interurban operations to Port Huron, Flint, Pontiac, Ann Arbor, Jackson and Toledo, Ohio and even operated interurban service from Windsor, Ontario.

The Detroit and Toledo Shore Line Railroad which linked Detroit with Toledo opened in 1903. The Detroit, Toledo and Ironton Railroad was formed in 1905 from the merger of two existing companies; it went bankrupt in 1908 but remained solvent and was later bought by Henry Ford in 1920 to carry raw materials and finished goods to and from his factories in Dearborn, Michigan.

The Michigan Central Railway Tunnel between Detroit and Canada opened in 1910 followed by a rushed opening of the Michigan Central Station in 1913 after a fire at the previous station, the first train to depart from the new station terminated in Bay City, Michigan. The New York State Barge Canal opened in 1918 offering an improved route to the Eastern seaboard compared to the Erie Canal. The Ford Airport (Dearborn) opened in 1924, which added an airship mooring mast in the following year. The Ford River Rouge Complex was completed in 1928, by which time it was the largest integrated factory with some 100,000 employees during the 1930s.

In 1920, mayor James Couzens vetoed a bond issue which would build a subway system, but it failed by one vote. Later in 1921, the Municipal Operations began streetcar operations in Detroit while the DUR continued to provide interurban service. It had been plagued by problems and soon, at midnight on May 15, 1922, the Department of Street Railways was created to provide the streetcar service.

=== 1929–1969 ===
The years following the Wall Street Crash of 1929 until 1969 saw the creation of the Interstate Highway System, rapid growth of the suburbs and associated shopping malls, the growing importance of civil aviation, and growing dominance of the motorcar; it also witnessed the end of the streetcar system in the city followed by an increased use of buses and the creation of three successful trolleybus lines. The 1967 Detroit riot only accelerated the rate at which people, mainly white, were moving to the suburbs, with some 88,000 leaving in 1968 alone. The city population peaked at 1.85 million in 1950 before falling to 1.5 million in 1970; the metropolitan area's population peaked in 1970 at 4.5 million. There was growing opposition to urban freeway construction in many cities across the US, including Detroit, in the 1960s and the city authorities modified, scaled back and cancelled a number of schemes and passed a decree stating that no further urban freeways would be constructed in the city.

The Ambassador Bridge, a road bridge to Canada, opened in 1929 and then the Detroit–Windsor Tunnel in 1930, which was also the year of the first flight from Detroit Metropolitan Wayne County Airport. By the late 1920s, railroad-highway intersections were becoming a serious source of travel delays and traffic collisions. The railway companies agreed to contribute half the $2 million cost of creating a number of grade-separated junctions; the Michigan Central Railway, Pennsylvania Railroad and Wabash Railway contributed $200,000 towards the ambitious 204-foot (62 m) Fort Street-Pleasant Street and Norfolk & Western Railroad Viaduct which opened in 1930. This work was undertaken when Fort Street close to the Ford River Rouge Complex was converted to a "superhighway" with a divided highway and night-time lighting. Then in 1931, the Grand Trunk Western Railroad launched a commuter service between Detroit and Pontiac, the trip took 45 minutes.

The city had one of the first municipally owned streetcar systems. The Department of Street Railways had taken over in 1922 since when it had been run by a three-man Detroit Street Railways Commission appointed by the mayor of Detroit. On June 14, 1930, the DSR launched a trolleybus route along Plymouth Road but the route had seen little use by 1936 due to the Great Depression and was discontinued on August 11, 1937. By 1934, the general manager, Fred A. Nolan, said that he wanted to convert the Detroit streetcar system to all buses operation by 1953 and the last streetcar actually ran in 1956. It remained in public ownership until 1974. Some sources claim that the Detroit streetcar system was purchased and dismantled by National City Lines as part of the 'Great American streetcar scandal', however, this was not the case as the company could not buy into the public system and lack of use of the streetcar system has to be explained by other reasons.

Approval was given in 1940 for the Davison Freeway, which was the nation's first urban depressed highway; the six-lane limited-access highway opened in 1942. In 1941, the Willow run bypass was rapidly constructed as a four-lane divided highway following the attack on Pearl Harbor to bring workers from Detroit to the Willow Run factory to the west of the city where Henry Ford had constructed a factory to produce the B-24 Liberator military aircraft.

By 1945, plans had been drawn up for a system of expressways and subways which included trains running within the median strips of these roads. The Ford airport closed in 1947 when all remaining services were transferred to Wayne County.

Also in 1945, the DSR purchased two PCC streetcars after finding out its existing streetcars were worn out; the cars, numbered #100 and #101, were diverted from an order by the Pittsburgh Railways Company and placed in service along Woodward, which at the time was the DSR's most-used car line. More PCC cars would arrive in May 1947 and August 1949.

The first major discontinued use of street rail occurred on Grand River on May 5, 1947, to alleviate rush hour congestion, which was alleviated further with the addition of two center lanes which were reserved for downtown-bound traffic during the morning and in the other direction in the evening. On September 15, 1949, the Crosstown (Warren Avenue) was converted experimentally into trolleybus service from Saint Jean Street to the Pierson Loop, although from 1955 to 1959 it operated to Ann Arbor Trail. Trolleybus service on the Crosstown line ended on March 31, 1961. The Grand River line was also converted experimentally to trolleybus operation partially in July 1951 and completely on September 5, 1951, and operated until November 16, 1962, when the vehicles were replaced by diesel buses. The General Manager of the DSR, Leo J. Nowicki, justified discontinued use of rail on Jefferson in January 1954, citing that the cost of replacing worn-out track and maintaining overhead wires would cost around $1,647,500 while the cost of purchasing 40 new 51-passenger diesel buses would only be around $800,000. On September 5, 1951, the Jefferson Carhouse closed, which resulted in the transferring of the Jefferson PCCs to the Gratiot Carhouse. Then on February 7 the Jefferson line was replaced by buses while the PCCs that operated the Jefferson line were used as backup cars for the remaining three lines. Then on September 8, 1954, the Gratiot Carhouse closed and the remaining PCC cars were transferred to the Woodward and Wyoming carhouses, resulting in Gratiot-assigned cars being forced to deadhead along Woodward followed by the Michigan portion of the Michigan-Gratiot line on September 7, 1955, and the closure of the Wyoming Carhouse on the same day, resulting in the PCCs being transferred to the Woodward Carhouse, resulting in the construction of two temporary tracks across Second Avenue into the Highland Park Shops. By 1956 only the Gratiot and Woodward line remained. On September 12, 1955, the Detroit Street Railway Commission approved the replacement of Detroit's last streetcar route for the spring of 1956. The commission argued that replacing streetcars with buses would allow more flexibility in route scheduling; eliminate mid-street loading zones and allow curbside passenger pick-up, increasing safety; and reduce operating cost.

Pan-Am (1954), and BOAC (1956), were the first airlines to operate from Detroit Metropolitan Wayne County Airport. Also in 1950 GM Truck & Coach introduced new 40-foot-long (12 m) diesel-powered transit coach and during 1951 the Mt. Elliott, Oakland, Trumbull, Clairmount, and Mack lines were converted from streetcars to buses. Streetcar ridership had declined after World War II and a protracted union conflict over single-man operation of a new generation of streetcars included a damaging 59-day strike during 1951. A decision on the future of streetcars in Detroit gained urgency with the nearing completion of the Edsel Ford Freeway as part of which the Detroit Street Railway Commission was expected to pay $70,000 to support streetcar operation over the new Gratiot Avenue Bridge. The Edsel Ford Freeway and The Lodge were completed in the 1950s

Northland Center, one of four new suburban shopping malls (the others were Eastland Center, Southland Center, and Westland Center) which opened 1954, was built by J. L. Hudson Company, a major upscale Detroit-based department store chain. The Jefferson Avenue line streetcar line was converted to buses in 1954, then the Michigan Avenue in line 1955. The days of PCC service on Gratiot Avenue were numbered as construction of the Edsel Ford Expressway inched closer to Gratiot, the DSR refused the option to operate the PCC streetcars over the new expressway. Thus, Gratiot Avenue PCC service ended on March 25, 1956, followed by Woodward Avenue two weeks later. An "End of the Line" grand parade and final excursion along Woodward Avenue was held on April 8, 1956. By late 1955, some 186 of Detroit's streetcars had been sold to Mexico City. The former Detroit PCCs continued to operate in Mexico City until the remaining tram service in that city was discontinued in 1984. Then on September 19, 1985, the remaining ex-Detroit PCCs were destroyed during the 1985 Mexico City earthquake.

The Saint Lawrence Seaway opened in 1959, allowing ocean-going ships to access the Great Lakes and Detroit. The Fisher Freeway was built in the early 1960s and the Chrysler Freeway in 1967 (both of which are now part of the I-75). In 1968, the Davison Freeway was extended a few blocks through a junction with the newly opened Chrysler Freeway.

In 1967, the Michigan State Legislature passed the Metropolitan Transportation Authorities Act of 1967 (Public Act 204). In provision section 124.405, the Southeastern Michigan Transportation Authority (SEMTA) was formed, initially it included the counties of Macomb, Monroe, Oakland, Saint Clair, Washtenaw and Wayne, as well as the city of Detroit, with Livingston County joining shortly after.

The new Jeffries Freeway (I-96) was intended to have followed the route of Grand River Avenue; however it led to opposition as did many other schemes across the country.

=== 1970–present ===
In the 1970s, the Jeffries Freeway was completed, followed by a number of transit schemes and pedestrian/cycling schemes. The population of the city fell from 1.5 million in 1970 to 910,000 in 2009; since 1970 the population of the metropolitan area has fallen by 100,000.

The modified Jeffries freeway opened in stages in 1970, 1971 and 1972 with further elements being added between 1973 and 1977.

In May 1971, SEMTA started its growth by purchasing Lake Shore Coaches, a bus company which connected Downtown Detroit to the Grosse Pointe communities as well as Saint Clair Shores. All six communities provided SEMTA a quarter of the funds that were required in order to obtain the federal funds that were used to purchase Lake Shore. Later, in 1974, SEMTA purchased the Detroit-Pontiac commuter train service from the Grand Trunk Western Railroad.

In 1976, a one-mile (1.6 km) narrow-gauge heritage streetcar (tram) service along an "L-shaped" route from Grand Circus Park to the Renaissance Center along Washington Boulevard and Jefferson Avenue, using trams from Lisbon, Portugal. The tram was originally just 3/4 miles long, but was extended 1/4 mile to the Renaissance Center in 1980. Also in 1976, president Gerald Ford offered $600 million for a region-wide mass transit system, however, except for the Detroit People Mover, it was never built.

In 1983, SEMTA discontinued the Detroit-Pontiac commuter trains, two years later Amtrak offered funds to construct a rail station at the Joe Louis Arena which would be the terminus of a commuter service to Ann Arbor, however, it was never constructed.

The Detroit People Mover opened in 1987 after some 20 years of discussion. In 1988, Michigan Central Station closed and passenger services were moved to a temporary station nearby until 1994, when service was extended to Pontiac and the Detroit (Amtrak station) opened in the New Center, Detroit area. In December 1988, Public Act 204 was amended and SEMTA was reduced to just Macomb, Oakland and Wayne counties, excluded the city of Detroit and renamed the Suburban Mobility Authority for Regional Transportation (SMART). This took effect in January 1989.

During the 1990s, two attempts were made to merge SMART and DDOT service. The first was in late 1994 and early 1995, when five routes were merged, however, that attempt was cancelled. Another attempt was made in late 1996 when SMART started operating full service in Detroit and DDOT launched five suburban routes, however that too never took off. Eventually, in 1998, DDOT announced it could no longer afford to operate in the suburbs and SMART took over DDOT's suburban routes. A year later, in 1999, MDOT announced that I-375 would be extended to the Detroit River, thereby eliminating all rail service into Downtown Detroit, however it never started.

The William G. Milliken State Park and Harbor which included a 52 berth marina opened in 2003; the park was then extended in 2009.

Washington Boulevard was refurbished in 2003 and the heritage narrow-gauge streetcar service was closed at the same time (the service had lost most of its patronage following the opening of the People Mover).

3.5 miles (5.6 km) of continuous RiverWalk along the Detroit International Riverfront between the Ambassador Bridge and Belle Isle and two of four planned pavilions opened in 2007. A further section of the riverwalk from the Ambassador Bridge to the River Rouge is not expected to open before 2012.

In 2009, the approach to the Ambassador Bridge from the US side was redesigned to provide a direct access to the bridge from I-96 and I-75. In the same year a 1.2 miles (1.9 km) section of the Dequindre Cut, a cycle and greenway from Gratiot Avenue south to Woodbridge Street, between Jefferson Avenue and the Detroit River; extensions are planned north to Mack Avenue and south to the William G. Milliken State Park and Harbor. The 'Detroit Non-Motorized Master Plan' was also published which proposed 400 miles (640 km) of bike lanes primarily through road diets. The Rosa Parks bus terminal opened.

In 2010, the new 407-foot-long (124 m) Bagley Avenue Pedestrian Bridge re-connected Mexicantown bridging both I-75 and I-96.

In 2018, construction began on the Gordie Howe International Bridge across the Detroit River between Detroit and Windsor, Canada. When completed in early 2026, the bridge will provide uninterrupted freeway traffic flow between Interstate 75 in Michigan with Highway 401 in Ontario. The bridge will also feature a free walking/biking path to cross the river. The bridge is named after Canadian ice hockey player Gordie Howe, whose celebrated career included 25 years with the Detroit Red Wings, and who died two years before construction began.

== Airports ==
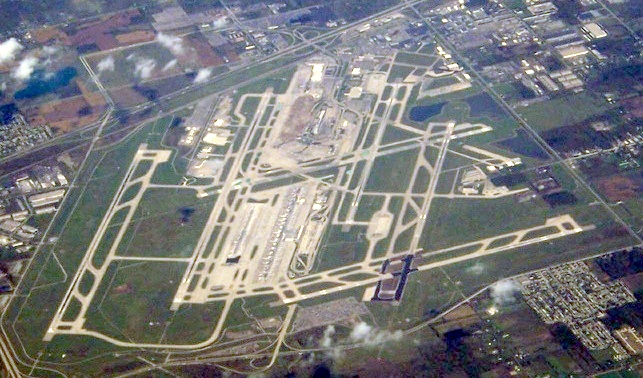
Detroit Metropolitan Wayne County Airport

Detroit Metropolitan Airport (DTW) is one of America's largest and most recently modernized facilities, with six major runways, Boeing 747 maintenance facilities, and an attached Westin Hotel and Conference Center. Located in nearby Romulus, DTW is metro Detroit's principal airport and is a hub for Delta Air Lines and Spirit Airlines. Bishop International Airport in Flint and Toledo Express Airport in Toledo, Ohio are other commercial passenger airports. Coleman A. Young International Airport (DET), commonly called Detroit City Airport, is on Detroit's northeast side, and offers charter service. Willow Run Airport in Ypsilanti primarily serves commercial aviation and offers charter services. Selfridge Air National Guard Base, a major military facility, is located in Mount Clemens. Smaller airports include Ann Arbor Municipal Airport (ARB), Oakland County International Airport (PTK) in Waterford Township which offers charter services, and St. Clair County International Airport near Port Huron, Michigan which serves as an international airport on the Canada–US border.

== Bicycling ==
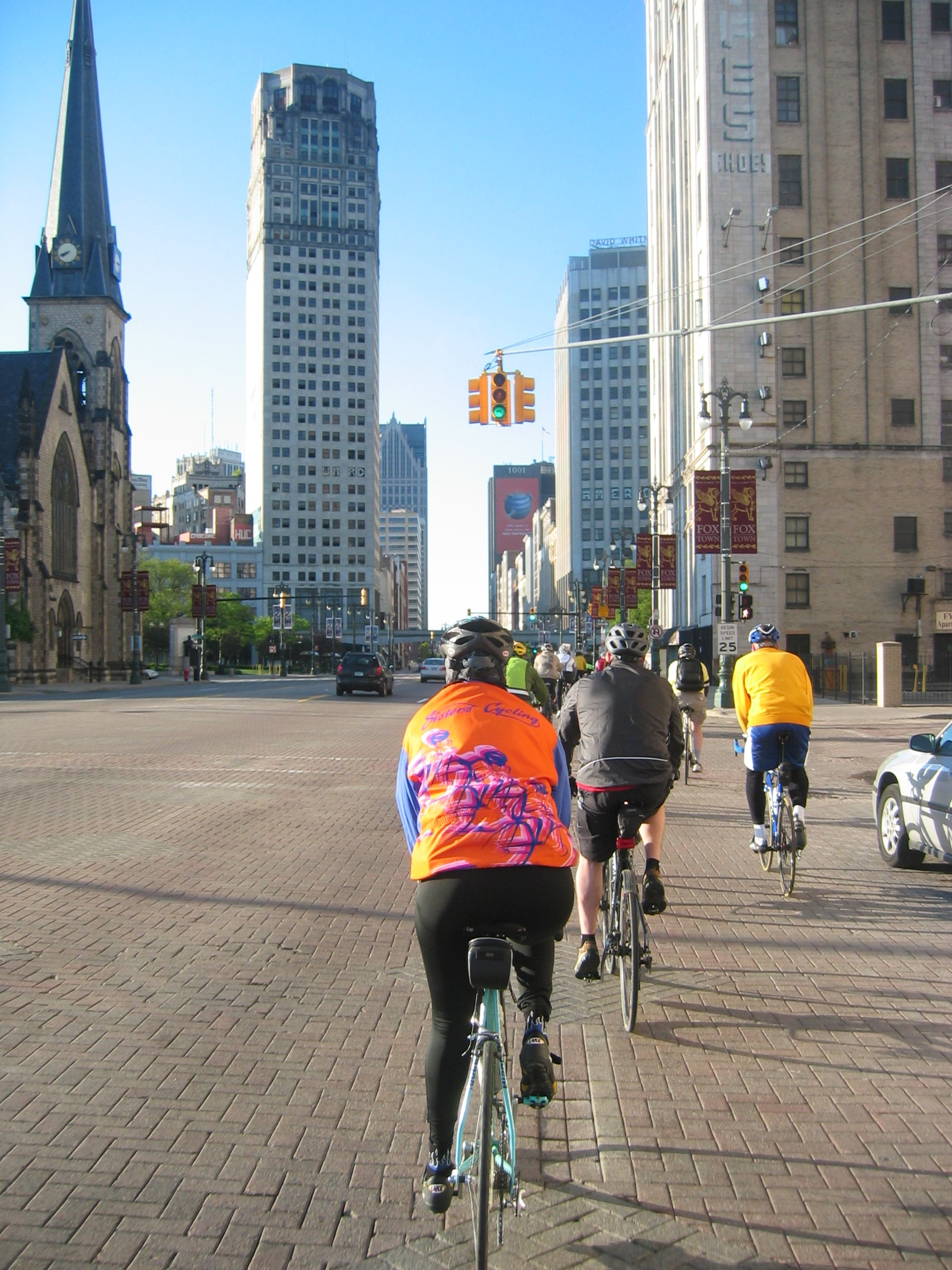
Cyclists riding along Woodward Avenue

Like many American cities, Detroit embraced bicycling during the "golden age" of the 1890s. However, as the automotive era began, the interests of bicycle shop owners, manufacturers, racers, and enthusiasts turned to the automobile.

Now, Detroiters are rediscovering the bicycle, helped in part by significant infrastructure investments as well as bicycle-friendly and extensive road infrastructure. The city and some bordering suburbs are served by MoGo, a bicycle sharing service.

== Freeways ==
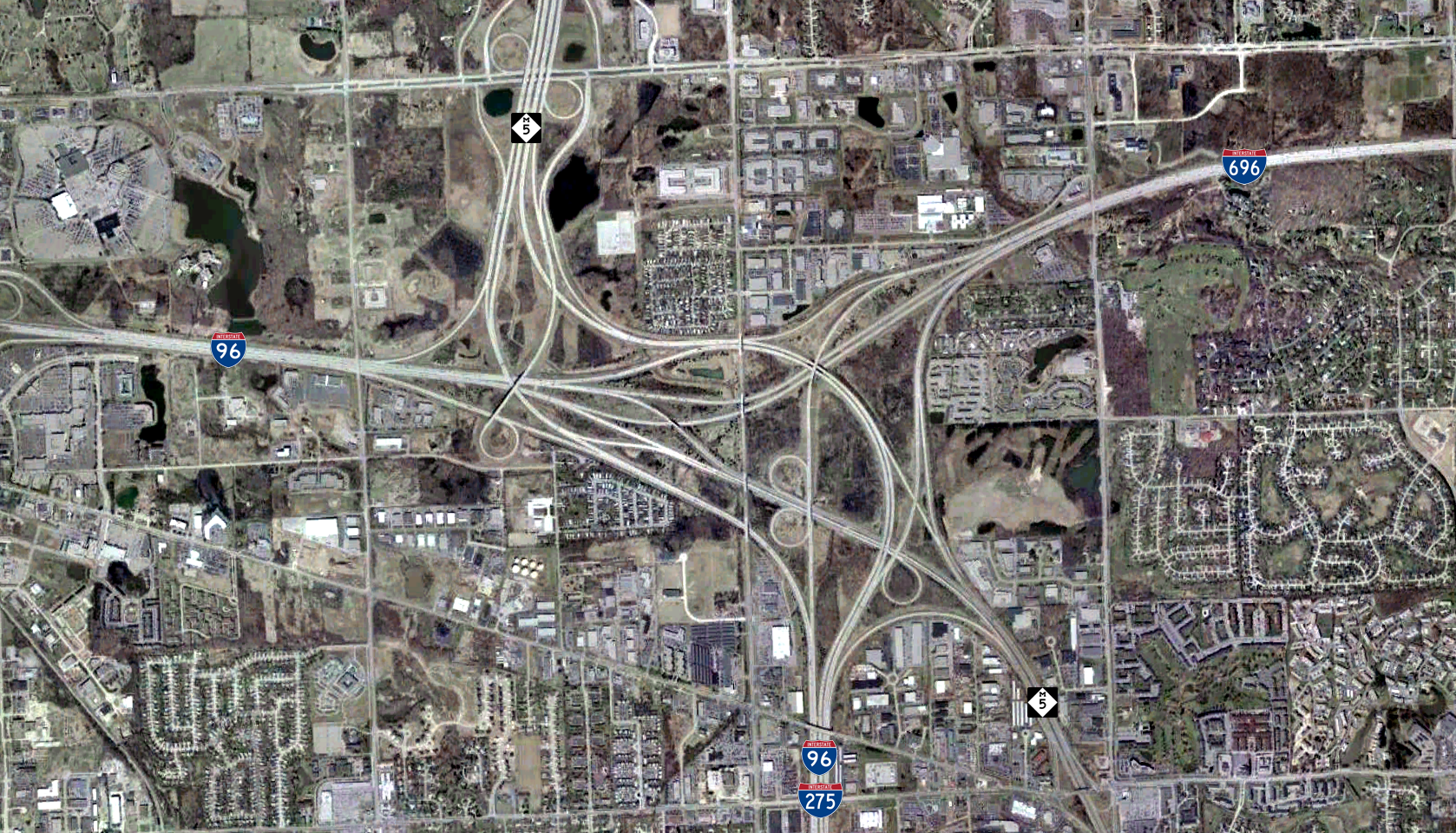
Satellite image of the interchange between I-96, I-275, I-696 and M-5

Metropolitan Detroit has a comprehensive network of interconnecting freeways including Interstate Highways such as Interstate 75 (I-75), I-94 and I-96. The region's extensive toll-free highway system which, together with its status as a major port city, provide advantages to its location as a global business center. Taxi services and rental cars are readily available at the airport and throughout the metropolitan area.

Detroiters often refer to their freeways by name rather than route number (Fisher Freeway and Chrysler Freeway for sections of I-75, Edsel Ford Freeway for a section of I-94, Jeffries Freeway for parts of I-96 and "The Lodge" for M-10. M-53, while not officially designated, is commonly called the Van Dyke Freeway. Other freeways are referred to only by number as in the case of I-275 and M-59 with their names not being in common everyday usage. Detroit area freeways are sometimes sunken below ground level to permit local traffic to pass over the freeway.

The Gordie Howe International Bridge, under construction, is a new crossing of the Detroit River that will link I-75 and I-94 in the US to Ontario Highway 401 in Canada, bypassing the Ambassador Bridge and at-grade intersections along Windsor's Huron Church Road.

== Public transit ==
No substantial rail transit system currently exists in Metro Detroit, so buses constitute the bulk of the area's public transportation network.

=== Buses ===
Two transit agencies operate local buses in Metro Detroit: the Detroit Department of Transportation (DDOT), which mostly serves the City of Detroit, and the Suburban Mobility Authority for Regional Transportation (SMART), which mostly serves the suburbs. The two systems coexist and complement one another's services, with an operating alliance and reciprocal fare agreement managed by the RTA of Southeast Michigan.

Through fixed-route buses, paratransit, dial-a-ride, and microtransit services, SMART's network covers much of suburban Metro Detroit, including the entirety of Macomb County, as well as participating communities in Wayne and Oakland counties. While most of SMART's bus routes run hourly, and travel entirely within the suburbs, the network is connected to downtown Detroit by FAST, a group of limited-stop routes with more frequent service along major corridors in the area. FAST also provides the most direct transit connection from downtown to Metro Airport. In addition, commuter express routes, operating during weekday rush hours, connect suburban park-and-ride lots to downtown.

DDOT's 36 bus routes are given route numbers between 1 and 68, while SMART's 44 routes are numbered in the triple-digits, spanning from 125 to 851. Their numbering schemes correspond: routes 1-6 of the DDOT network travel roughly in the direction of the corresponding SMART number series. For example, DDOT route 2 follows Michigan Avenue, which goes on to travel through the general area of the SMART routes whose numbers begin with 2. Similarly, DDOT routes 7 and 17, crosstown routes following 7 Mile and 8 Mile respectively, run parallel to SMART's mile-road crosstown routes, whose numbers begin with 7.

The agencies' buses can easily be told apart by their color schemes. DDOT's older buses are white with yellow-and-green stripes, while their newer buses are mint green. SMART, on the other hand, uses a wider palette of colors; their newest buses are gray, while others are painted in black, blue-and-yellow, green-and-yellow, and green-and-white schemes. The makes and models in the systems' fleets also present a contrast: DDOT mostly operates New Flyer Xcelsior buses, while SMART's fleet is composed largely of Gillig BRTs.

Throughout the city's recent history, numerous plans to construct bus rapid transit lines have been proposed, though none have yet come to fruition.

Transit Windsor's Tunnel Bus, an hourly service connecting downtown Detroit to neighboring Windsor, Ontario, via the Detroit–Windsor Tunnel, was cancelled in 2025.

=== Downtown rail systems ===
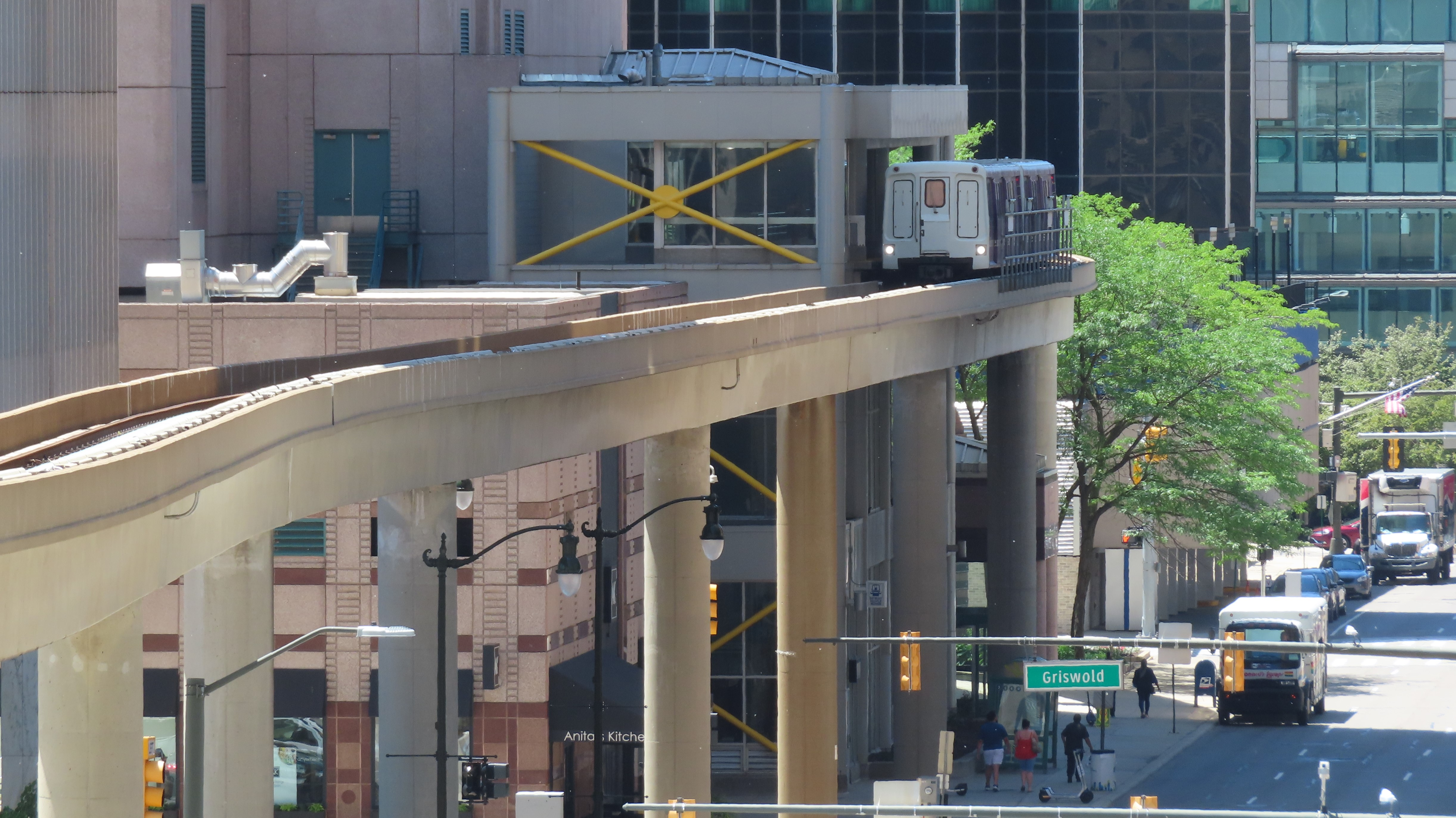
People Mover

==== People Mover ====
The Detroit People Mover is a 2.94-mile (4.73 km) elevated automated people mover which operates in a one-way loop encircling downtown Detroit, stopping at 13 stations in the central business district.

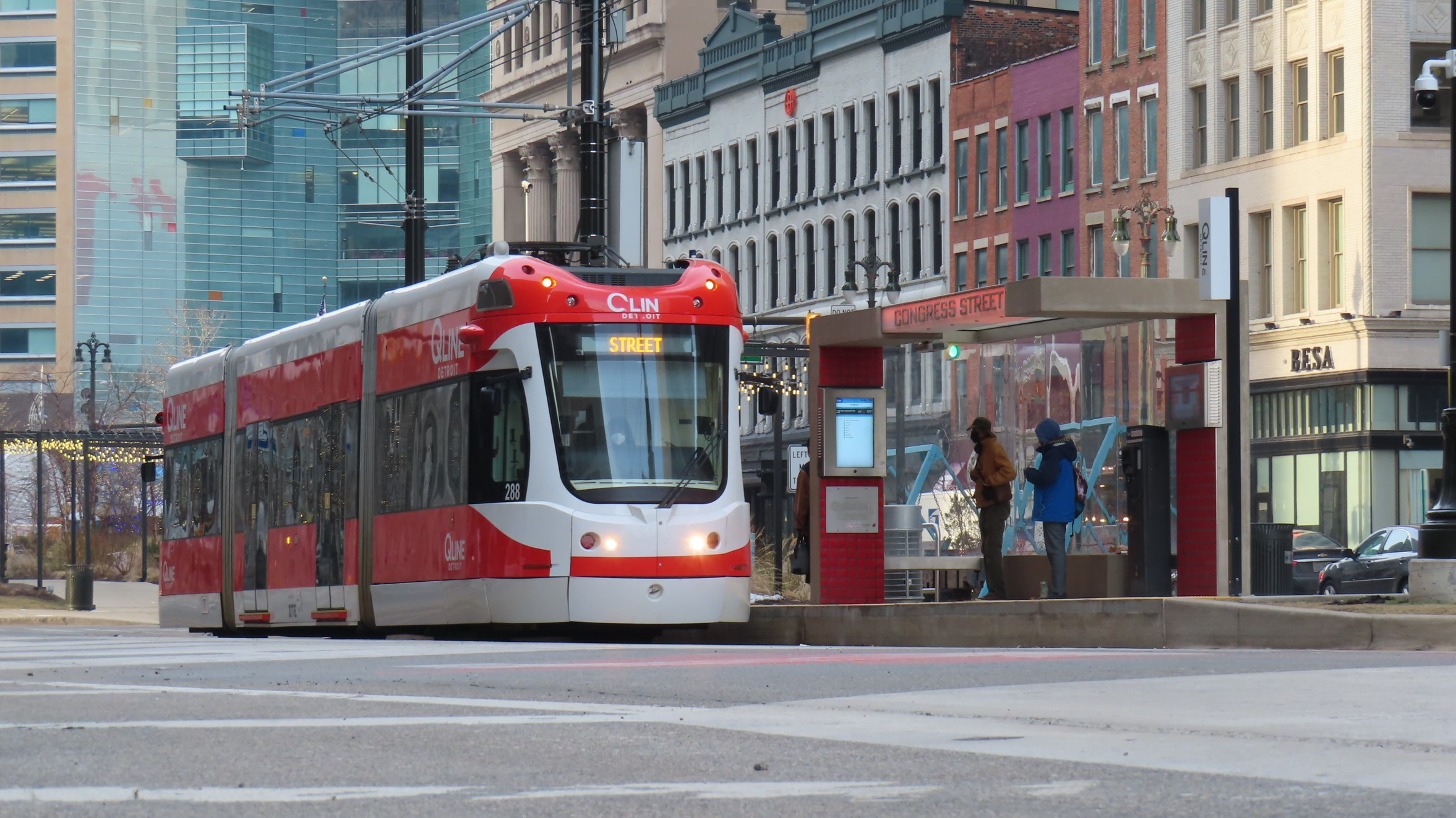
QLine

==== QLine ====
The QLine, built in the mid-2010s, is a 3.3-mile (5.3 km) electric streetcar which runs from downtown Detroit to Midtown and New Center, following Woodward Avenue for its entire length, and stopping at twelve stations. It connects downtown with Little Caesars Arena, Wayne State University, numerous museums, and the city's Amtrak station. It is so named after Detroit-based Rocket Mortgage, who acquired the naming rights while known as Quicken Loans. With support from a State of Michigan subsidy, the QLine is currently free to ride.

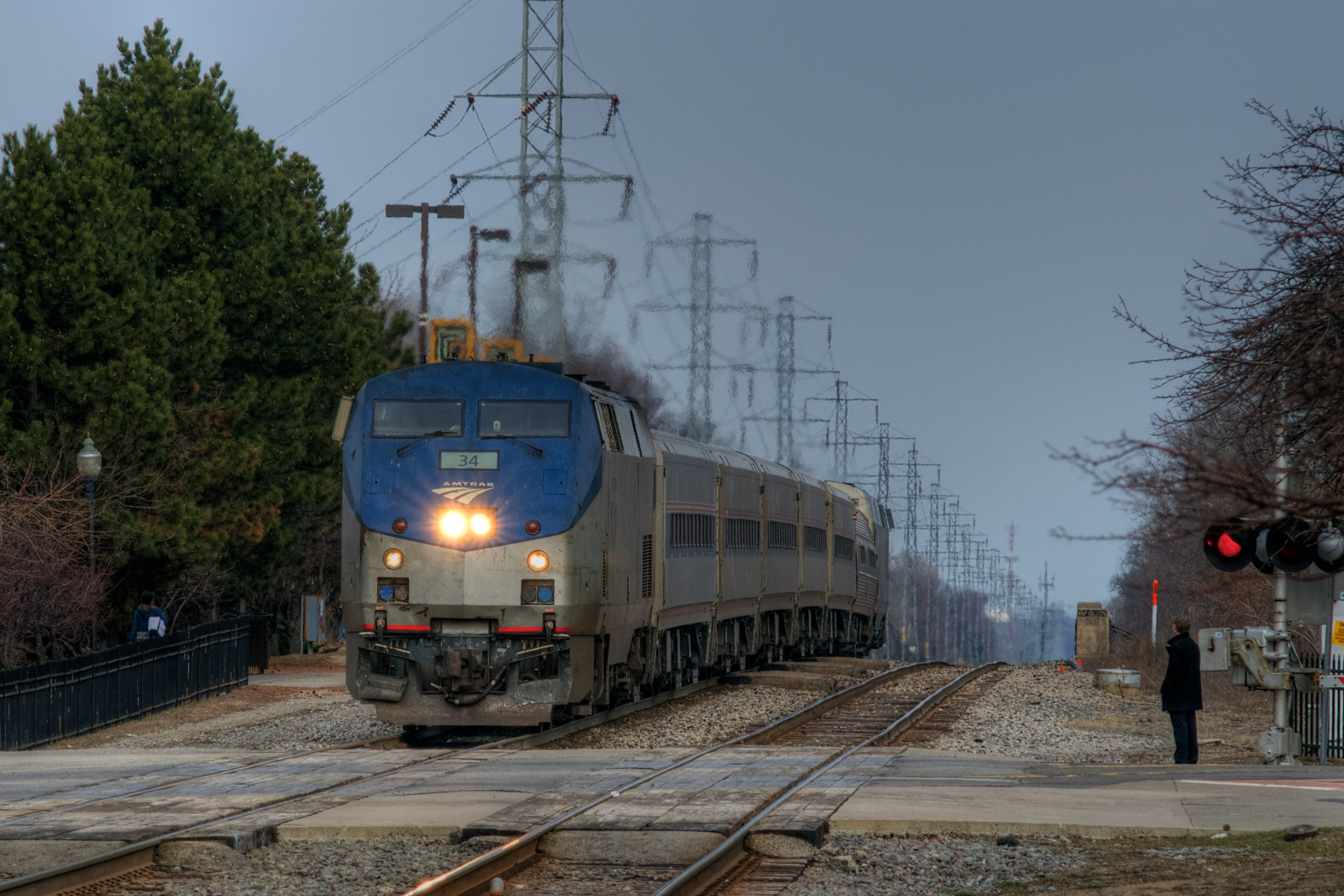
Amtrak Wolverine approaching Royal Oak in 2011

=== Intercity rail ===
The only long-distance passenger rail service currently offered in the area is the Wolverine, a thrice-daily Amtrak service from Pontiac to Chicago. The Wolverine makes intermediate stops in Troy, Royal Oak, Midtown Detroit, Dearborn, and Ann Arbor, before continuing west through Michigan and Indiana to its terminus at Chicago Union Station.

Significant infrastructure work was completed along the Michigan Line in the 2010s to improve journey times on this line including rebuilding stations, upgrades to signals, and track upgrades.

==== Ann Arbor-Detroit Regional Rail ====
Ann Arbor-Detroit Regional Rail (formerly "SEMCOG Commuter Rail") is a proposed regional rail link between the cities of Ann Arbor and Detroit. The route would extend 39.72 mi (63.92 km) along the same route used by Amtrak's Wolverine, with stops to include existing Amtrak stations in Ann Arbor, Dearborn, and Detroit, plus infill stations in Ypsilanti and Wayne. Originally proposed in 2009 by the Southeast Michigan Council of Governments (SEMCOG), the project's oversight was transferred to Regional Transit Authority of Southeast Michigan (RTA) in May 2016 and added to its master plan. Estimated capital costs would total $130 million, and the route is projected to cost $11-$19 million annually to operate.

=== Intercity buses ===
Detroit is served by a number of intercity bus operators. Indian Trails is among the largest, operating services from Detroit to Ann Arbor, Flint, Lansing, Grand Rapids, Kalamazoo, St. Ignace, and Chicago, among other destinations. In partnership with the RTA, Indian Trails also operates the D2A2, an hourly bus from downtown Detroit to Ann Arbor, and the Michigan Flyer, an express service from Metro Airport to Ann Arbor and East Lansing.

Other intercity bus operators include Flixbus, who operates daily services to Lansing, Grand Rapids, Muskegon, Toronto, and Montreal. Its sister network, Greyhound, is also prevalent, with routes connecting Detroit to a number of cities across the United States. Megabus also operates routes to several cities, largely in the Midwest.

Most intercity buses in Detroit originate at the city's main bus terminal, an MDOT-owned facility located on Howard Street just southwest of downtown. Others, like the D2A2, depart from Grand Circus Park. Some buses also stop in the suburbs: select Greyhound buses stop at a Southfield terminal and the Pontiac and Dearborn Amtrak stations, with the former two also served by Indian Trails.

== See also ==
- Plug-in electric vehicles in Michigan § Detroit
