= Joseph Campau Historic District =

Historic district in Michigan, United States

- Jos. Campau Historic District
- U.S. National Register of Historic Places
- U.S. Historic district
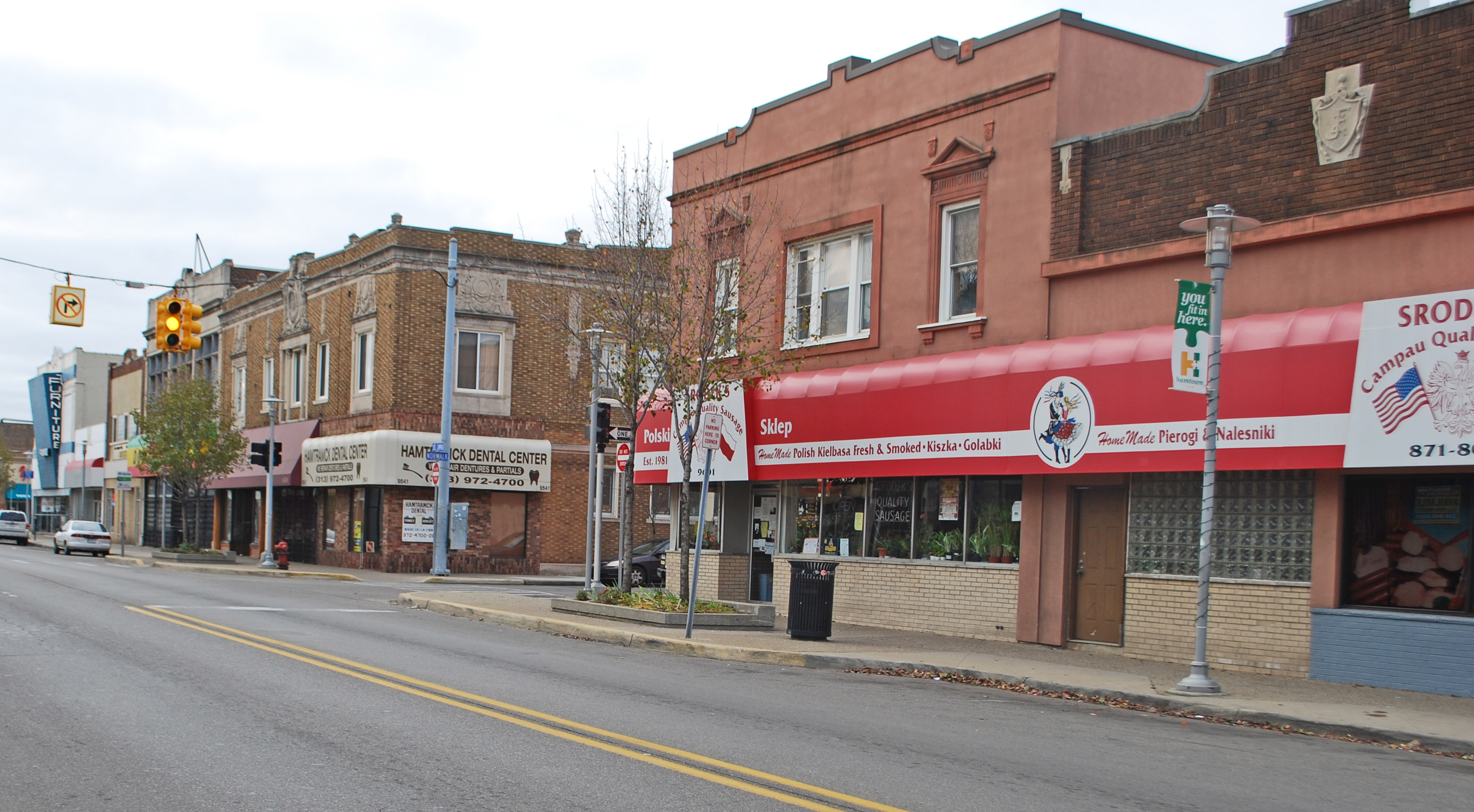
- Joseph Campau at Norwalk

- Location within Michigan Location within the United States
- Interactive map
- Location: Along Joseph Campau Street, roughly bounded by Holbrook, Pulaski, Casmere, and Lehman Sts. in Hamtramck, Michigan
- Coordinates: 42°23′55″N 83°3′32″W
- NRHP reference No.: 12000870
- Added to NRHP: October 17, 2012

The Joseph Campau Historic District is a commercial historic district located along Joseph Campau Street in Hamtramck, Michigan. The district runs from roughly Holbrook and Lehman Streets on the south to Pulaski and Casmere Streets on the north. It was listed on the National Register of Historic Places in 2012.

== History ==
The township of Hamtramck was established in 1798; in 1901 a portion of the township centered around Joseph Campau Street was incorporated as a village. In 1910, Hamtramck was home to 3500 people, and Dodge decided to build a new automotive plant, Dodge Main, at the southeast corner of the village. The plant was completed in 1914 and workers flooded into the area, many of them Polish. By 1920, the population of Hamtramck had boomed to 48,000, an increase of over 13 times in ten years. The increase in population meant an increase in housing and commercial space, and in 1922 Hamtramck incorporated as a city.

Most of the stores along the main shopping street, Joseph Campau, opened in the 1920s. The surrounding neighborhoods were densely packed single-family homes, and this section of street quickly became the second busiest shopping district in southeast Michigan, after only downtown Detroit.

== Description ==
The district contains 131 structures built along Joseph Campau Street, of which 80 contribute to the district's historic designation. According to the Michigan State Housing Development Authority:

Joseph Campau Street is a unique collection of buildings in southeast Michigan reflecting early 20th century commercial architecture. It is entirely adjacent to a dense neighborhood of single-family homes having a strong, cultural community focus. This connection makes the district still viable today and it retains an atmosphere of a small town main street.

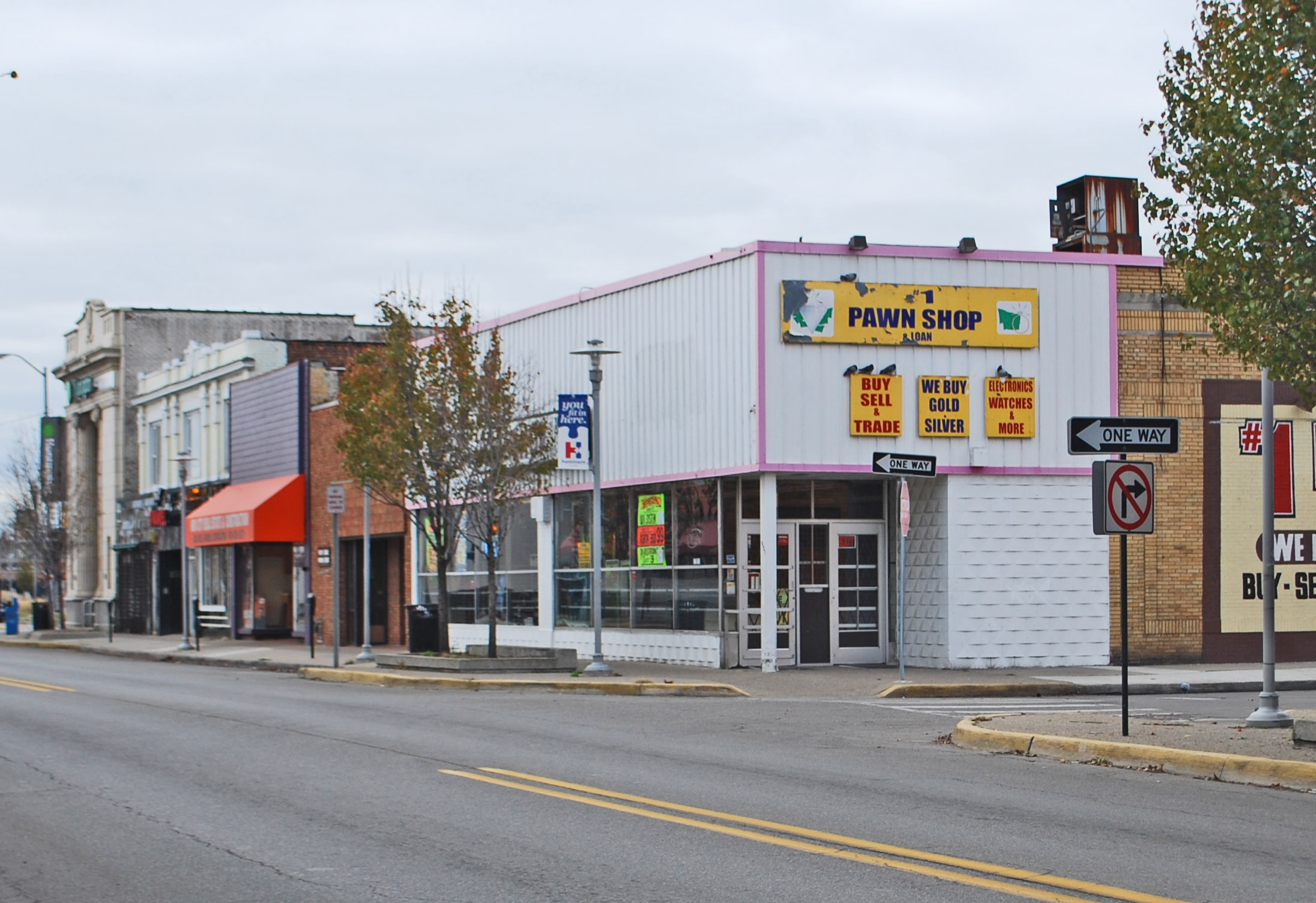
Joseph Campau at Florian

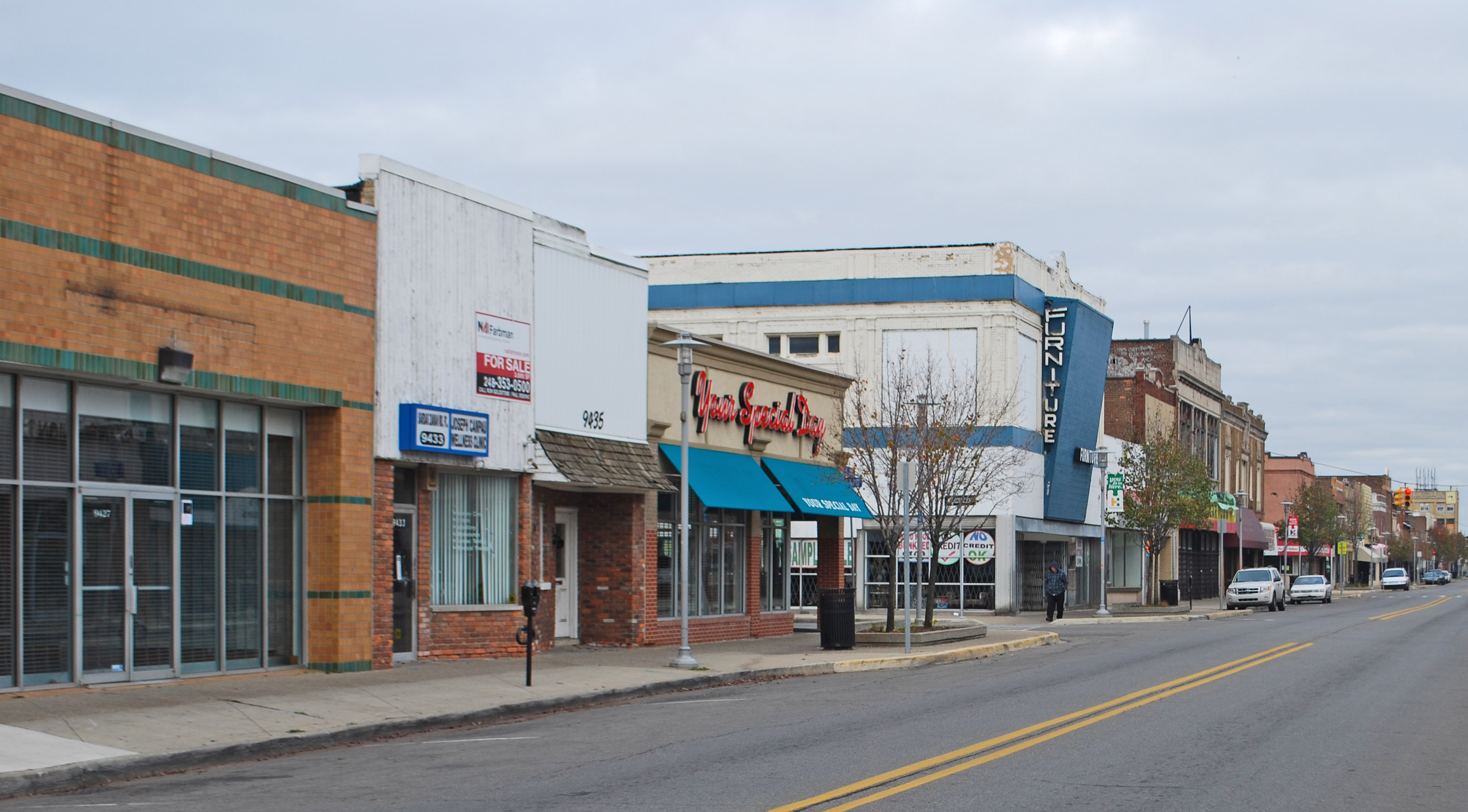
Joseph Campau at Poland

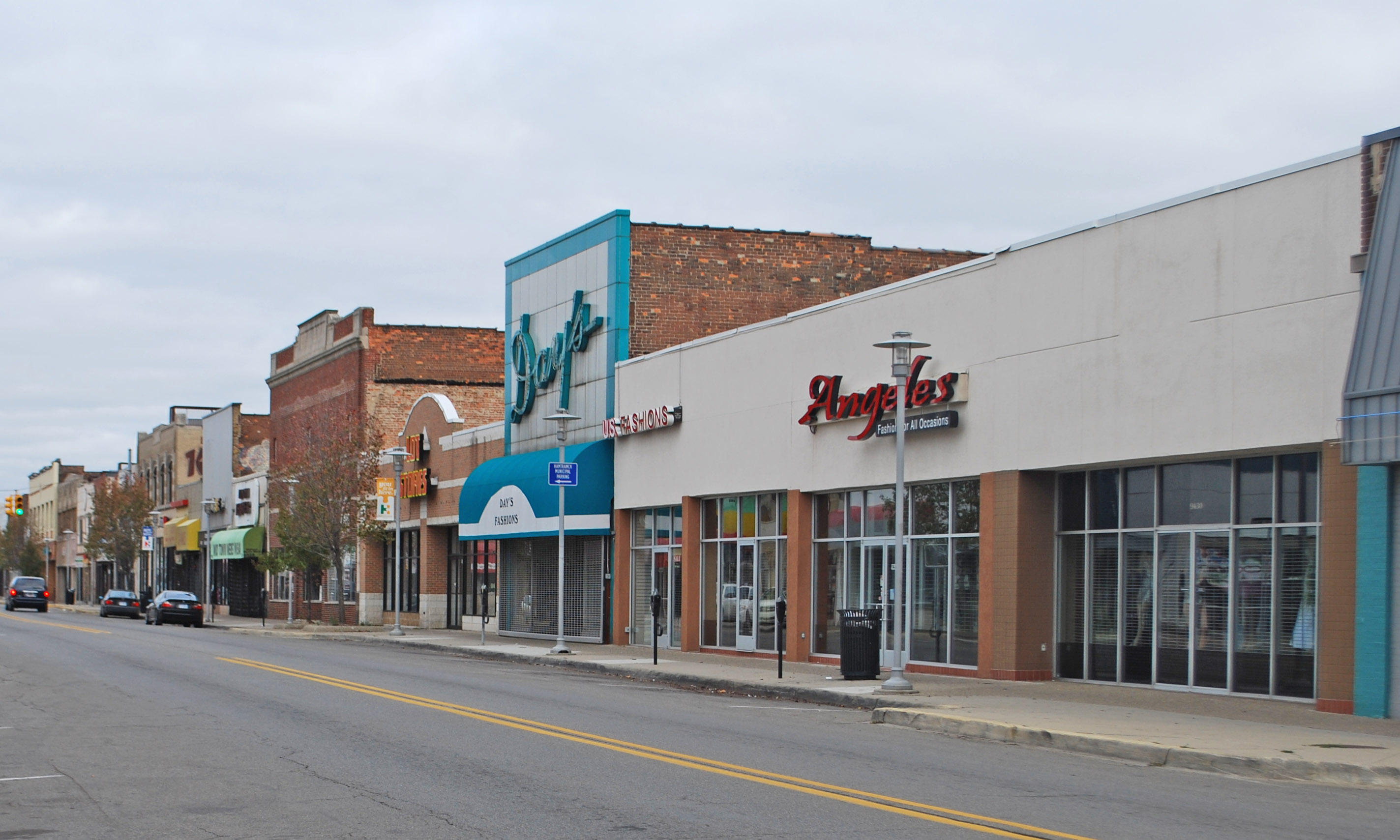
Joseph Campau near Poland

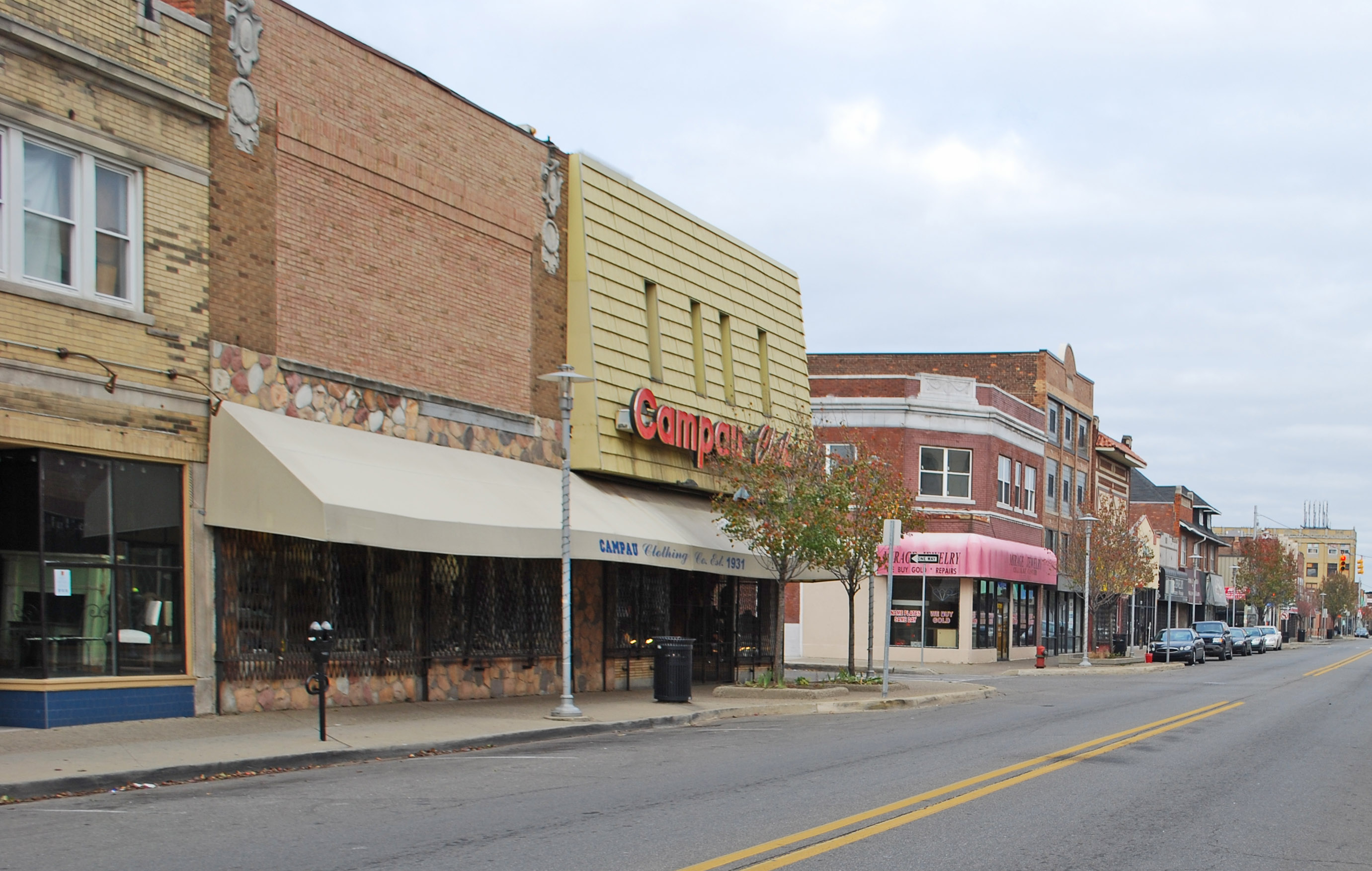
Joseph Campau at Edwin

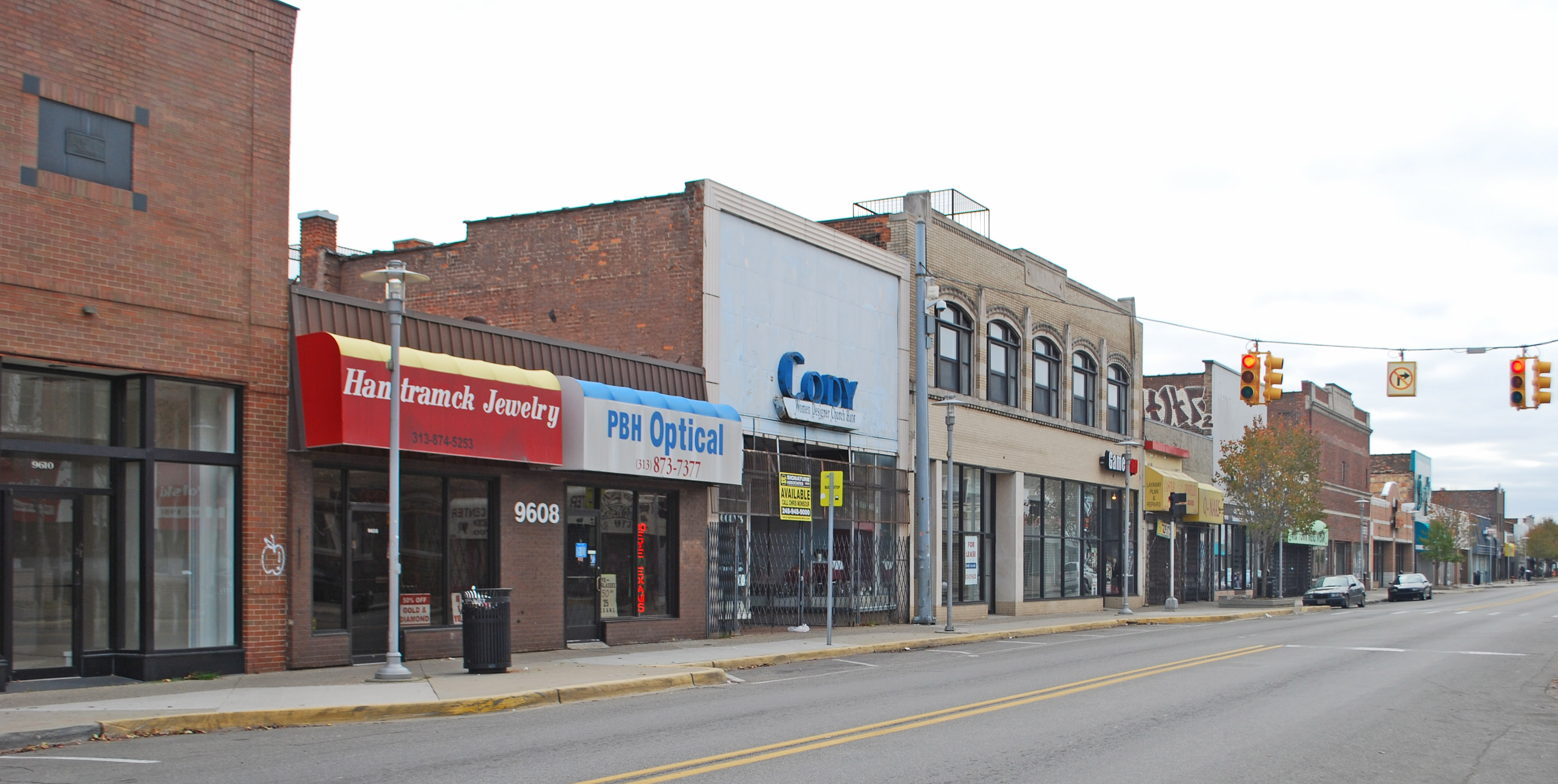
Joseph Campau near Norwalk

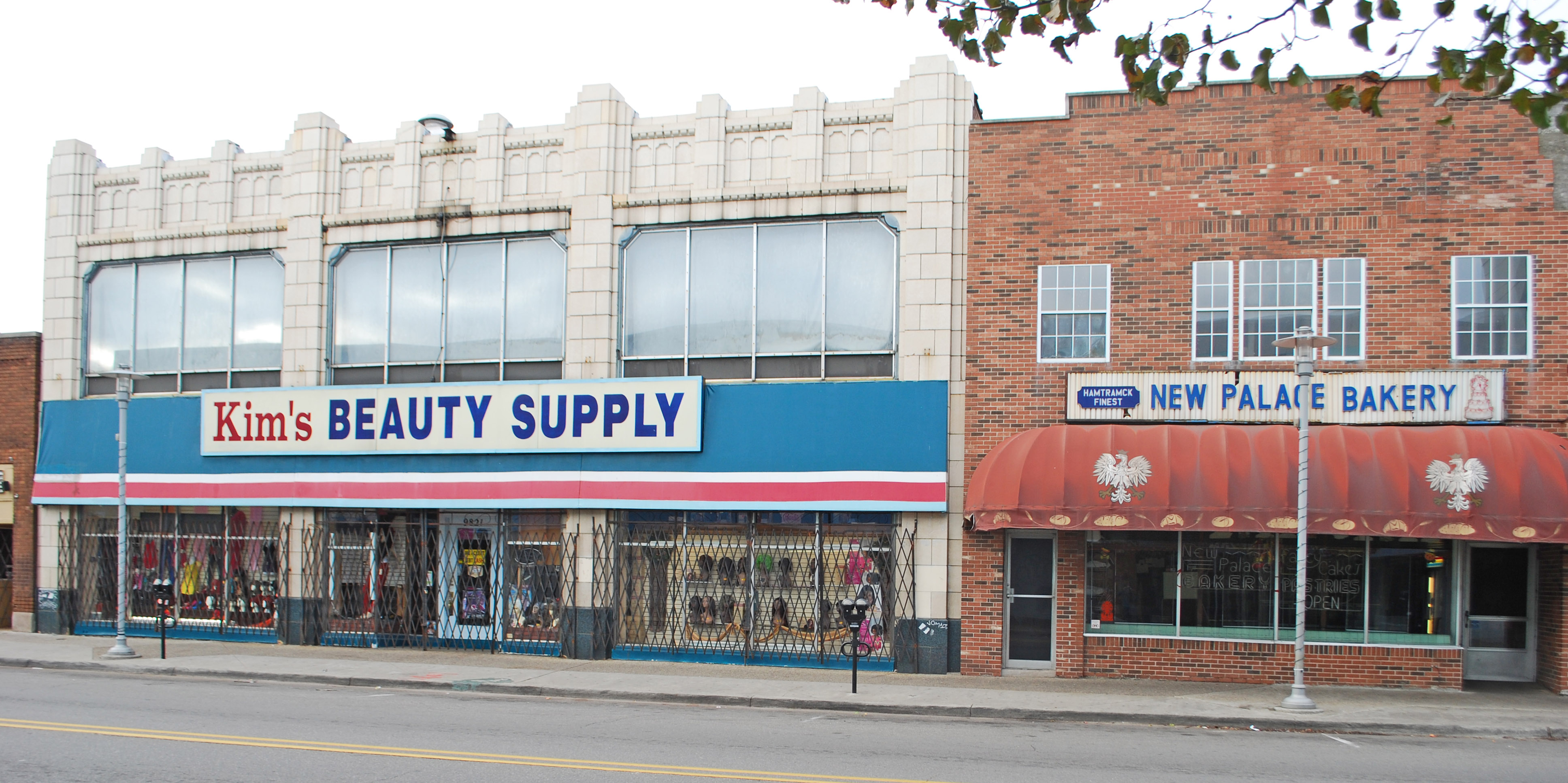
Joseph Campau near Evaline

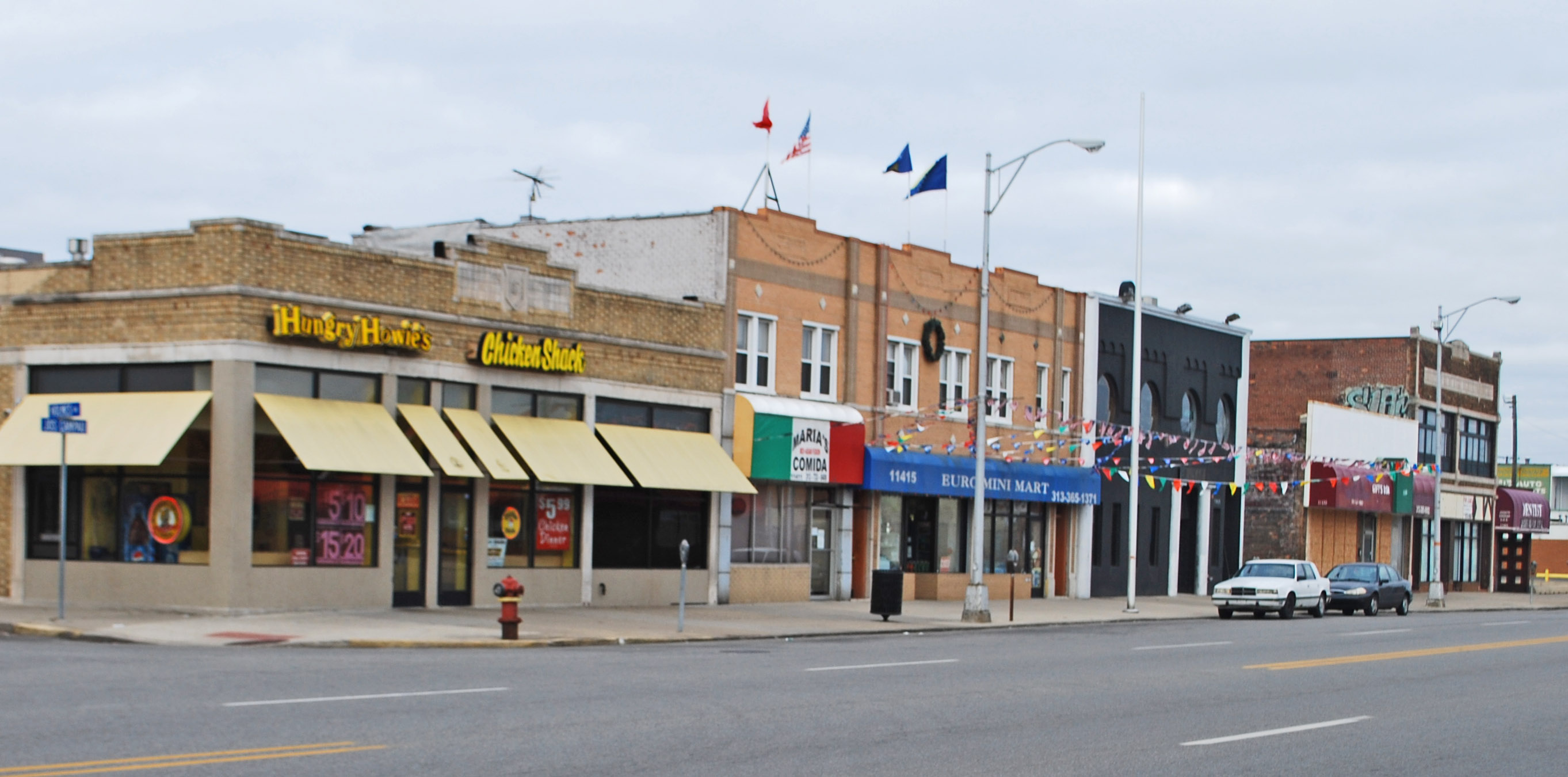
Joseph Campau at Holmes

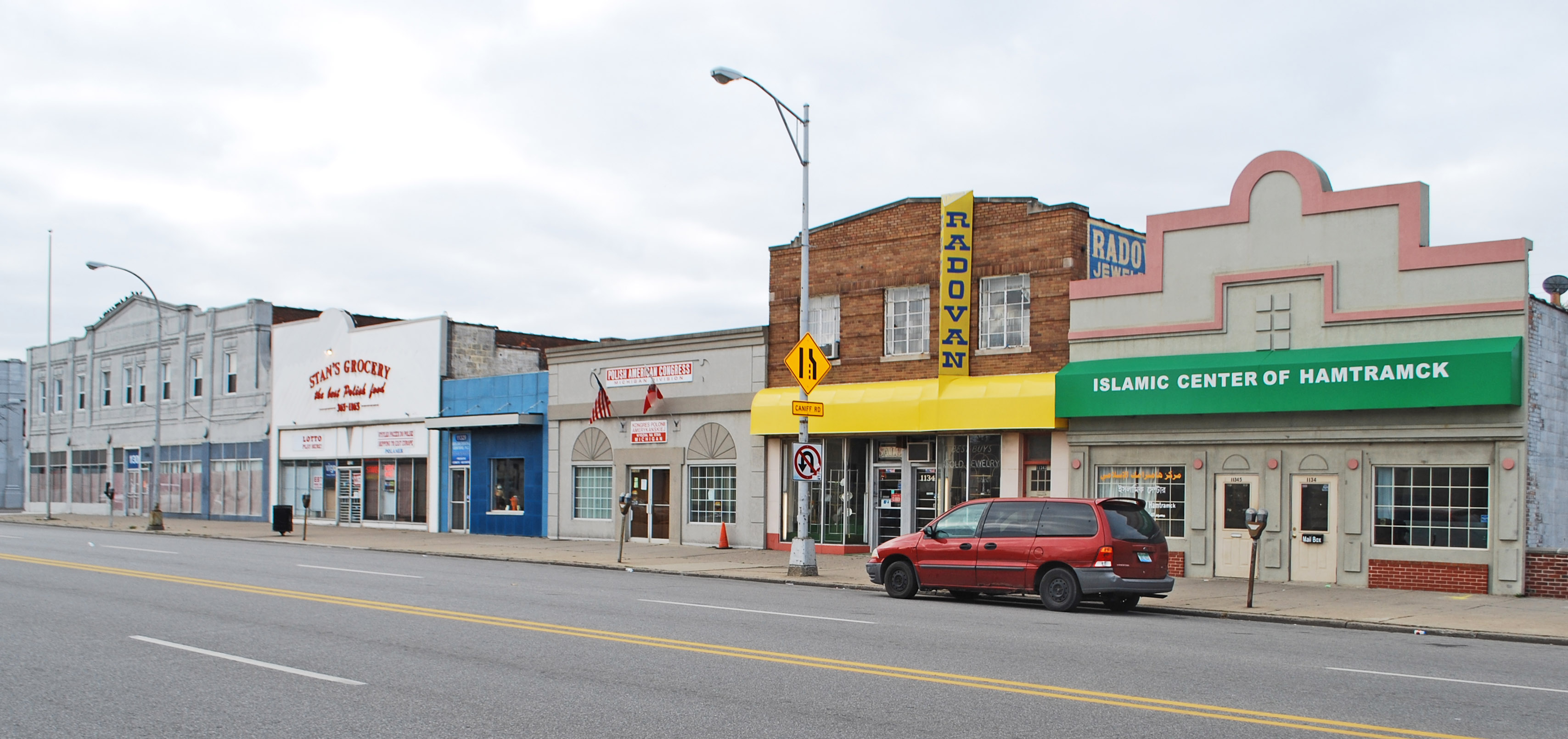
Joseph Campau N of Caniff

== See also ==
- Joseph Campau, namesake for the street and district
