= Awurama Badu =

Ghanaian highlife musician

- Born: 1945; Banko, Sekyere-East District, Ashanti Region.
- Died: October 26, 2017. Effiduase Government Hospital, Sekyere-East District, Ashanti Region
- Occupation: Musician

Awurama Badu (Ewurama Badu) was a Ghanaian highlife musician born in 1945 and from Banko in the Sekyere Kumawu District of the Ashanti Region. Popularly known for her stage performance and hit songs, she was a gifted and talented Highlife musician who had a breakthrough when the music industry was largely dominated by males with few females to fight for a place in the industry, according to "Bessa Simons" (Highlife musician). Awurama has four children—two sons and two daughters.

== Music career ==
Badu was formerly with the Ghana Police Band (known for their live band performances) before she established herself in the highlife music industry. Her music career started at the time when women played little role in highlife music. She scored hit songs like "Medofo Adaada Me", "Komkom", "Emelia", "Odo Tie Me Nni Obiara" and "Obaatan Refre Ne Mma".

On December 5, 2015, Action Senior High & Technical School as part of their 15 years of academic excellence honoured Badu in a special citation, the school extolled her astute qualities as a role model, musician and how her songs had helped shape society as well as educated people on some social vices.

Her continuous hard work and commitment to the music industry was rewarded by a non-governmental organization, Values for Life, founded by the Ghana’s former deputy Minister for Tourism, Arts and Culture, Dzifa Gomashie in 2016 for her contribution to arts and music in Ghana.

== Life Experience and death ==
Her last public performance was at the 2013 edition of Citi FM‘s night of Music of Ghanaian Origin, held at the National Theatre of Ghana.

In July 2017, Badu made her last public appearance when she attended the 2nd Annual General Meeting of GHAMRO at the Kwame Nkrumah University of Science.

Badu died at the Effiduase Government Hospital in the Ashanti Region on Thursday, 26 October 2017. The cause of her death is not yet known but sources say the singer had been ill for some time. She was 72.

== See also ==
- Music of Ghana
