= Mogo (company) =

Canadian finance company

Mogo Inc.
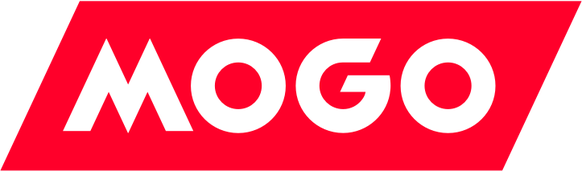
- Company type: Public
- Traded as: TSX: MOGO
- Industry: Financial services
- Founded: 2003
- Founder: David Marshall Feller
- Headquarters: Vancouver, British Columbia
- Products: Personal loans, identity fraud protection, mortgages, Visa Debit card, credit score, Bitcoin wallet
- Subsidiaries: Carta Worldwide
- Website: mogo.ca

Mogo Inc. is a Vancouver-based company, founded in 2003 by David Marshall Feller. The company offers loans, "identity fraud protection", mortgages, a Visa Prepaid Card, and credit score viewing through Equifax for select customers. Mogo had an initial public offering on the Toronto Stock Exchange in June 2015. In January 2016, Mogo made a deal with Postmedia to exchange a percentage of profits for free newspaper ads. In January 2017, the company began offering mortgages. In January 2021, Carta Worldwide was acquired by Mogo Financial for $24 million CAD in stock.
