= Raphaels Bank =

R. Raphael & Sons Limited
- Type: Private company limited
- Industry: Financial services
- Founded: 1787
- Founder: Raphael Raphael
- Defunct: 30 October 2020
- Fate: In liquidation
- Headquarters: London, England, UK
- Area served: Europe
- Key people: J H A Quitter (Chairman)
- Products: personal savings, multi-currency ATMs, consumer credit, prepaid cards, credit cards
- Revenue: £ 91.6 million (2013)
- Operating income: £ 38.2 million (2013)
- Net income: £ 4.1 million (2013)
- Number of employees: 84 (2013)
- Parent: Lenlyn Holdings
- Website: raphaelsbank.com

R. Raphael & Sons Limited, trading as Raphaels Bank, was a small UK-based independent bank that provided prepaid and credit card services, personal savings products, consumer credit, and a multi-currency ATM network.

It was established in 1787 by Dutchman Raphael Raphael who moved to London at the start of the Napoleonic Wars. The bank was owned by the Raphaels family until 1983 and was owned by the Lenlyn Holdings plc starting in 2004. It went into liquidation in October 2020.

== History ==
R Raphael & Sons was founded by Dutchman Raphael Raphael, in 1787. Raphael built up a considerable wealth during the Napoleonic Wars, and later diversified the business to include stockbroking, foreign banking and bullion broking.

Successive generations of the Raphael family moved into public share issues, raising loans for European governments, and transactions in American railway stocks in Europe. In 1890, Raphael's was a major contributor to the Bank of England fund to rescue Barings Bank.

The Raphael family finally severed links with the bank in 1983. Since 2004, the bank has been a subsidiary of Lenlyn Holdings. The bank is sited in Piccadilly, London and at Walton Lodge, in Walton, Aylesbury a grade II listed building, part of Walton Terrace.

In 2014 the bank had an issue with inter-company transfers that resulted in a rare fine from the UK Prudential Regulation Authority.

In early 2016, plans became public that PayPal would use Raphael Bank to offer Mobile Payment Services in Germany and in Italy, by integrating into the Vodafone Wallet. In April 2017, Vodafone Germany announced the availability of PayPal in the Vodafone Wallet, referring to R Raphael & Sons plc as the provider, and licensed by Visa.

In March 2019, it was reported in the press that Raphaels Bank would soon be closing after failing to attract a buyer. The shareholder, Lenlyn Holdings, had been trying to sell it since 2015. The book of motor loans had been sold to Paragon Bank in 2018 and the pre-paid card business had been closed down. The bank commented that while they were gradually withdrawing from other lending activities, they continued to maintain existing services.

In May 2019 the Bank of England and the UK Financial Conduct Authority fined the bank £1.89 million because it had failed to properly supervise the companies to which it outsourced large parts of its operations. This had resulted in thousands of its customers being unable to use their payment cards on Christmas Eve in 2015.

In October 2019, the bank shut down its savings account division.

On 6 July 2020 the bank gave up its banking licence from the Prudential Regulatory Authority and on 30 October it entered members' voluntary liquidation.
