= Benjamin Agyeman-Badu =

English footballer

Ben Agyeman-Badu
Personal information
- Full name: Benjamin Agyeman-Badu
- Date of birth: 2 October 1998 (age 28)
- Place of birth: London, England
- Position: Winger

Youth career
- 2014–2016: Blackpool
- 2014–2015: → Ryan FC

Senior career*
Years	Team	Apps	(Gls)
2016–2017	Blackpool	0	(0)
2017–2018	Sloboda Užice	18	(0)
2018	Ankaran	7	(0)
- * Club domestic league appearances and goals as of 2 January 2019

Benjamin Agyeman-Badu (born 2 October 1998) is an English former professional footballer who plays as a winger.

== Career ==
Born in UK capital London, Benjamin Agyeman-Badu played with youth-team of Blackpool In the season 2014–15 he played on loan at Ryan FC as scholar. In summer 2015 he returned to Blackpool youth team. In 2016 he was part of Blackpool scholars While with Blackpool youth team, he also played as full-back. In 2016 he became senior by playing simultaneously with Blackpool's reserves team. The records mention him in a number of naming variants, from fullname Benjamin Agyeman-Badu, to Benjamin Agyemang-Badu, Benjamin Agyeman, Benjamin Badu, Ben Agyeman or Ben Badu.

In summer 2017 he left England and joined Serbian club Sloboda Užice.

On 25 August 2018, Agyeman-Badu made his league debut for Slovenian Second League side Ankaran.

== Personal life ==
Agyeman-Badu holds a joined British and Ghanaian nationality.

In April 2020, Agyeman-Badu was charged with attempted murder and possession of a firearm with intent to endanger life. He and his two co-defendants were remanded in custody. On 15 August 2022, Agyeman-Badu was jailed for thirteen years.
