= Music of Ghanaian Origin =

Music festival in Ghana

Music of Ghanaian Origin (MOGO)
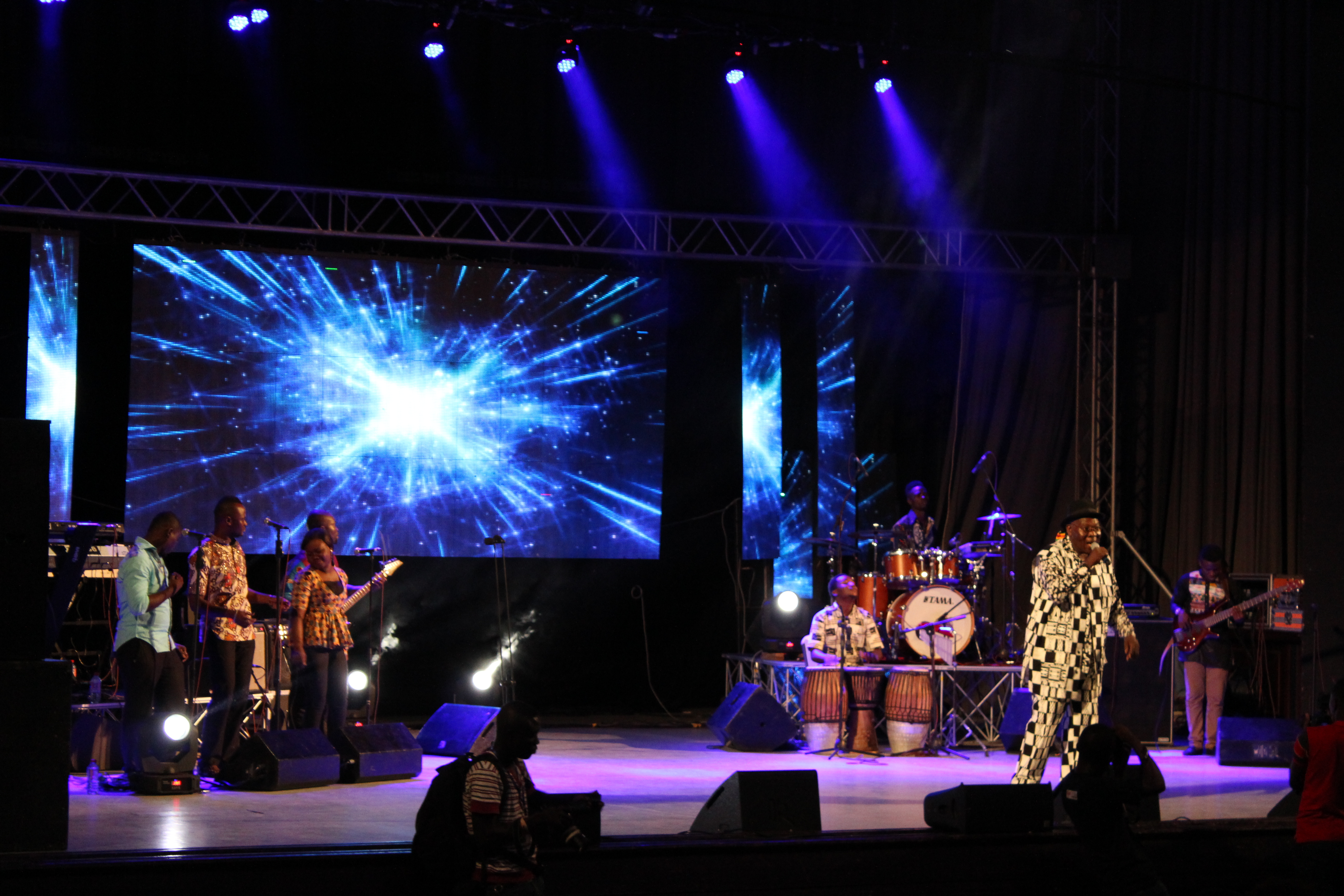
- Paapa Yankson a Ghanaian Highlife musician performing with a band at MOGO Festival
- Genre: Ghanaian Highlife, Jama and other indigenous Ga music, other Ghanaian music genres, Poetry
- Location: Various locations but within the Greater Accra-Ghana
- Years active: 9 years
- Founders: Citi FM 97.3

Music of Ghanaian Origin also known as MOGO is a celebration of music originating from Ghana. It started in 2007. It was initially an annual one-day event but in 2015 was extended into a one-week festival and named MOGO Festival. An awards show was also instituted as part of the celebration. MOGO was created by Citi FM a Ghanaian radio station.
