= MoGo =

Public bicycle-sharing system in Detroit

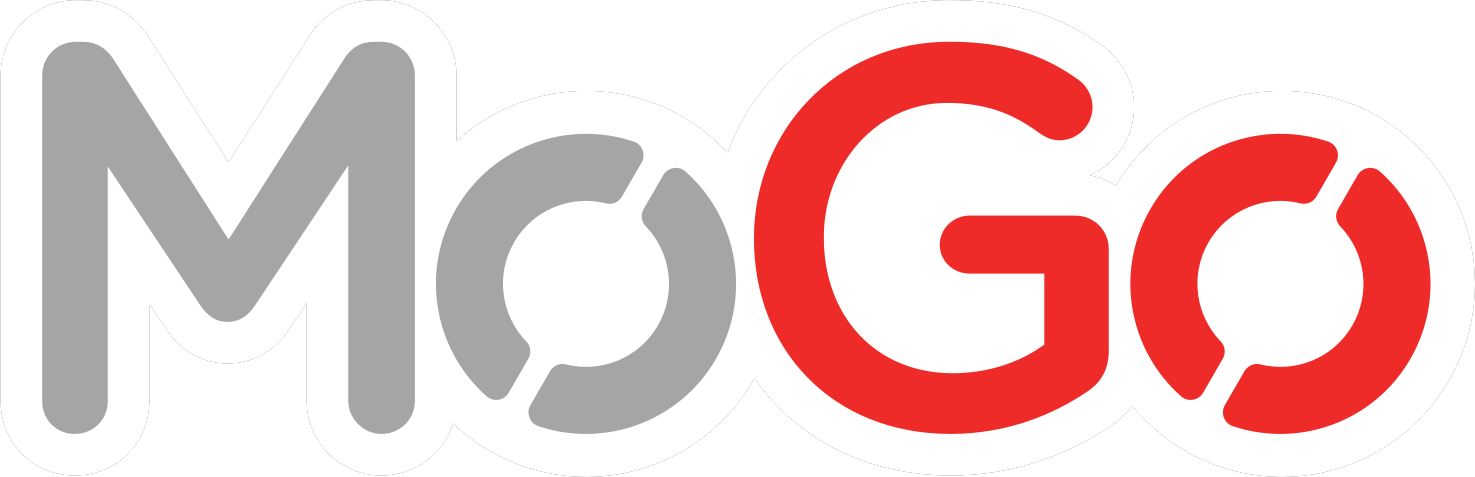

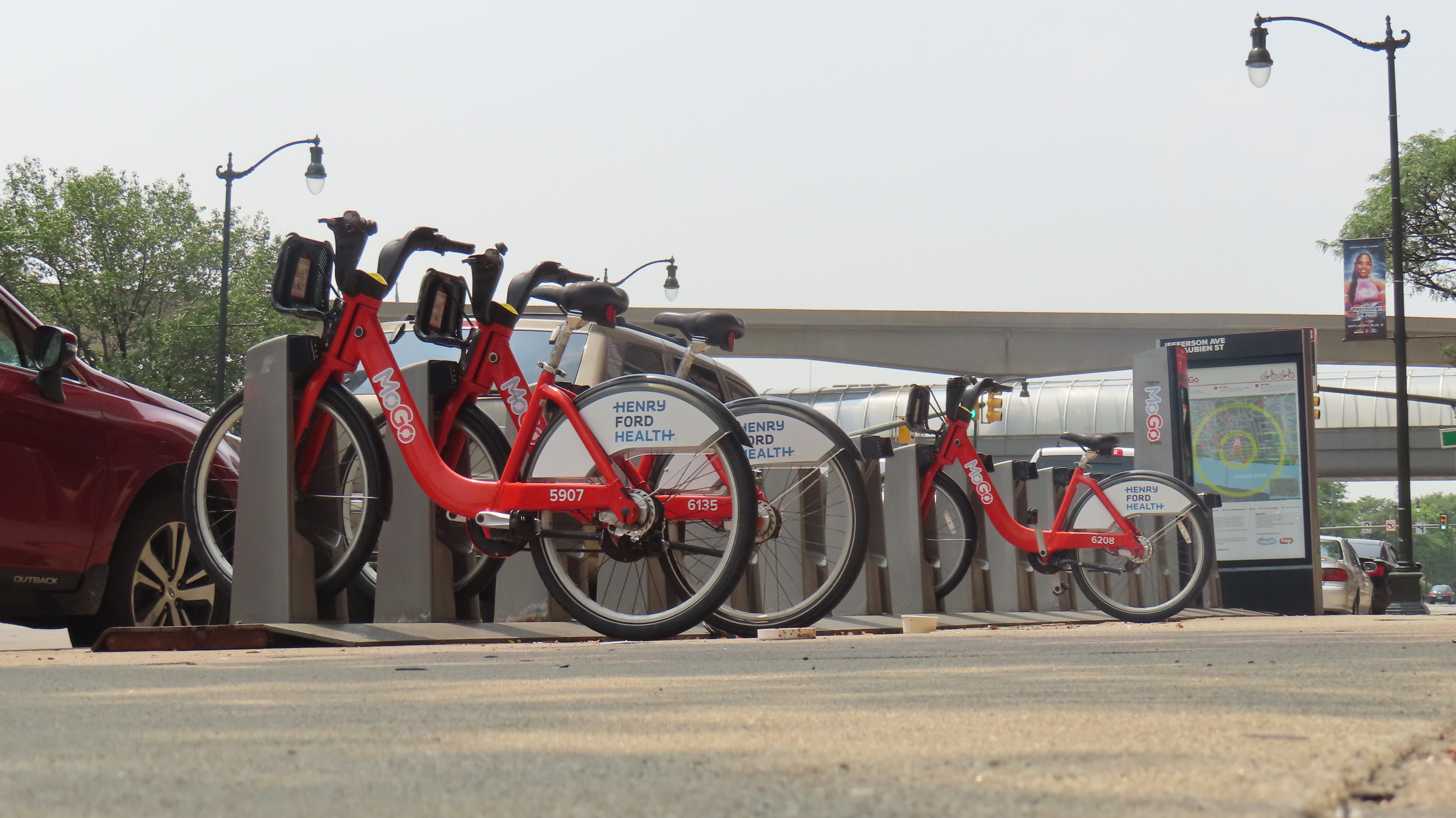
- MoGo station in downtown Detroit

Overview
- Locale: Detroit, Michigan, U.S.
- Transit type: Bicycle sharing system
- Website: mogodetroit.org

Operation
- Began operation: May 23, 2017; 9 years ago
- Operator: Shift Transit
- Number of vehicles: 662

MoGo is a public bicycle-sharing system in Detroit. In operation since 2017, MoGo is owned by a nonprofit organization of the same name, headquartered at One Campus Martius in downtown Detroit.

As of October 2026, MoGo has temporarily suspended operations.

== History ==
Planning began in 2012 to establish a bicycle-sharing system in Detroit, headed by Lisa Nuskowski, the eventual founder of Detroit Bike Share. The system, eventually named MoGo, commenced operations on May 23, 2017, with a ceremonial ride in which cyclists rode the system's 300 original bicycles from a central location to their assigned docking stations across the city. The system's ridership exceeded expectations, logging 100,000 rides within its first six months of operation.

To better serve riders with disabilities, MoGo piloted the MoGo Adaptive cycling program in May 2018. The six-month pilot program was successful, and has been offered every summer since. Later, in 2019, MoGo introduced 50 rentable Class I electric bicycles, dubbed MoGo Boost, available at select stations in the main MoGo network.

Nuskowski left MoGo in 2021, becoming the president of M-1 Rail. She was replaced as executive director by Adriel Thornton.

MoGo launched a significant expansion in June 2020, adding stations in northwestern Detroit and several suburbs on the Woodward Corridor to the city's north in Oakland County, taking the system beyond Detroit's city limits for the first time. In September 2022, the network was expanded further, with the addition of three new stations on Belle Isle.

In September 2023, MoGo announced the addition of 26 additional electric bicycles to the fleet, of an improved model relative to the fifty units introduced in 2019. The agency has announced their intention to invest in additional electric bicycles.

In May 2026, it was reported that MoGo was experiencing significant financial losses, and that the Detroit Transportation Corporation, owner of the Detroit People Mover, was planning to acquire the system and assume its operations. On October 22, 2026, MoGo announced that the system would "close for the season" and suspend operations.

== Fleet and network ==
MoGo's main fleet currently consists of 646 utility bicycles, both conventional and electric (painted red and black respectively), built by PBSC Urban Solutions. Most are branded with the logo of Henry Ford Health, the system's most prominent corporate sponsor, over the rear wheel. As of October 2026, they were docked at 80 stations, located throughout Downtown and Midtown Detroit, Corktown, Mexicantown, Rivertown, West Village, Belle Isle, Northwest Detroit, and the suburbs of Ferndale, Royal Oak, Huntington Woods, Berkley, and Oak Park. When out of service, the bicycles are stored and maintained in a warehouse in New Center.

=== Adaptive cycles ===
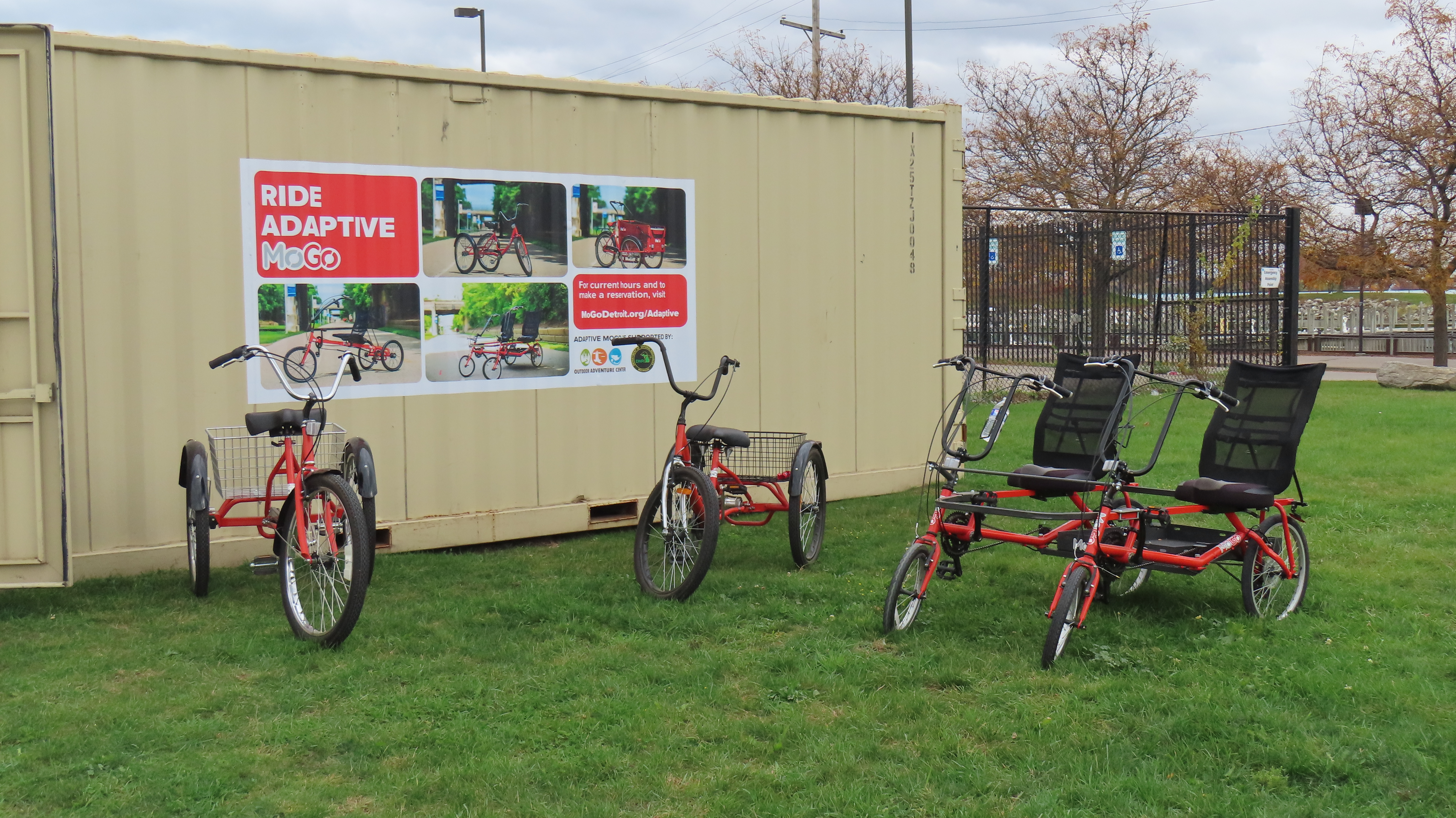
Adaptive cycles

In addition to conventional bicycles, MoGo also offers a small fleet of sixteen alternative cycles, including tricycles and recumbent bicycles, for use by people with disabilities. These specialized cycles are not compatible with the equipment of the more comprehensive MoGo rental network, and as such are only offered seasonally (from May through October) at two staffed locations (one on the Detroit River Walk, and another in Ferndale) during limited hours.

== Pricing ==
The standard price to rent a MoGo bicycle, either conventional or electric, is $1, plus 25¢ per minute of use thereafter. Daily, monthly, and annual passes are also available, offering unlimited rides for a set period, as are prepaid passes, which allow a set amount of ride time to be purchased at once.

Individual rentals and passes can be paid for by credit card at stations or by phone through the Transit app, while passes can also be paid for through Cash App or with cash using the City of Detroit's DivDat bill payment kiosks.
