= Windsor Subdivision =

Overview
- Status: Operational
- Owner: Canadian Pacific Kansas City
- Locale: Southern Ontario
- Termini: London; Windsor
- Stations: London; Glencoe; Chatham; Windsor

Service
- Type: Heavy rail
- System: Canadian Pacific Kansas City
- Services: Windsor–Toronto Corridor

History
- Opened: 1890

Technical
- Track gauge: 1,435 mm (4 ft 8 1/2 in) standard gauge

The Windsor Subdivision is a rail line owned and operated by the Canadian Pacific Kansas City (CPKC) in the Canadian province of Ontario and the U.S. state of Michigan.

The line runs from London, Ontario, where the Galt Subdivision continues east, west to Detroit, Michigan. The Windsor Subdivision intersects the Canadian National Railway's CASO Subdivision at College Avenue in Windsor. The Windsor Subdivision crosses the Canada–United States border through the Detroit River Tunnel and ends at 24th Street in Detroit at Conrail's Michigan Line.

== History ==
The line from London to Windsor was opened by the Ontario and Quebec Railway (leased to CP in 1884) in 1890; the Detroit River Tunnel opened in 1910. Until 1985, the tunnel was owned by the Michigan Central Railroad and its successors, including Conrail. Conrail sold the tunnel and connecting Canada Southern Railway (CASO Subdivision) in 1985 to Canadian National and Canadian Pacific; CN sold its half-share in the tunnel in 2001.
