= Ingersoll station =

Railway station in Ontario, Canada

Ingersoll
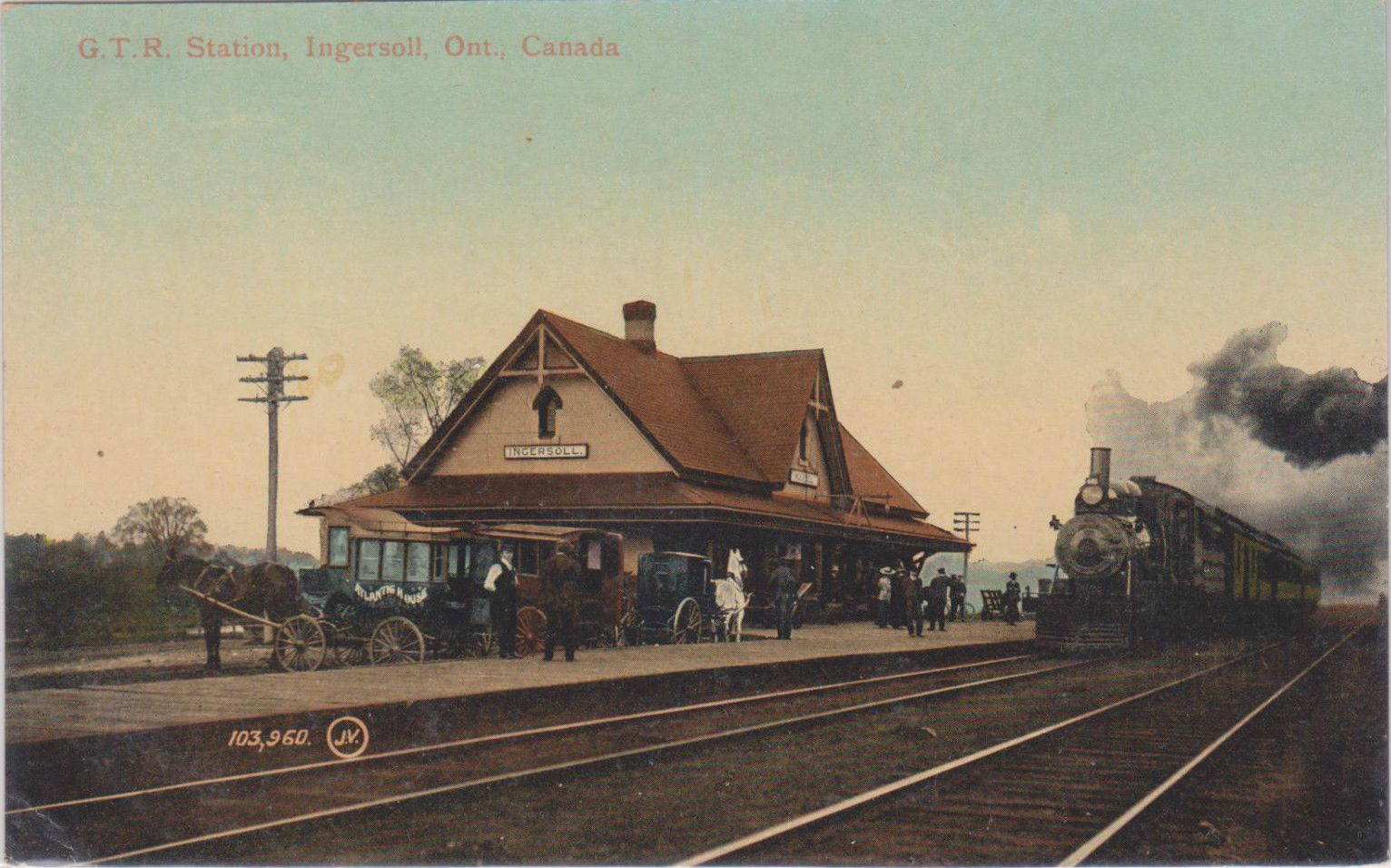
- Ingersoll Grand Trunk Railway Station in 1915

General information
- Location: 1 Thames Street North, Ingersoll, Ontario; Canada
- Coordinates: 43°02′26″N 80°53′17″W
- Owner: Via Rail
- Platforms: 1 side platform, 1 island platform
- Tracks: 2

Construction
- Parking: Yes
- Accessible: Yes

Other information
- Status: Sign post

History
- Opened: 1886

Key dates
- Demolition: The original station was demolished on December 7, 2020; 5 years ago.

Services
Preceding station	Via Rail	Following station
London toward Windsor	Windsor–Toronto	Woodstock toward Toronto
Former services
Preceding station	Amtrak	Following station
London toward Chicago	International 1982–1990	Woodstock toward Toronto
Preceding station	Canadian National Railway	Following station
Dorchester toward Sarnia	Grand Trunk Railway; Main Line	Beachville toward Montreal
Location

Ingersoll station is a train station in Ingersoll, Ontario, Canada serving Via Rail. It is a stop for some trains operating between Toronto and Windsor; as of 2023, three trains stop per day at Ingersoll.

== History ==
The station was originally built in 1886 by the Great Western Railway which was purchased in 1882 by the Grand Trunk Railway and merged into the Canadian National Railway in 1920.

The historic building was closed in 1979 when VIA took over train operation and a utilitarian wooden frame structure, containing a waiting room and washroom facilities, was built just to the east.

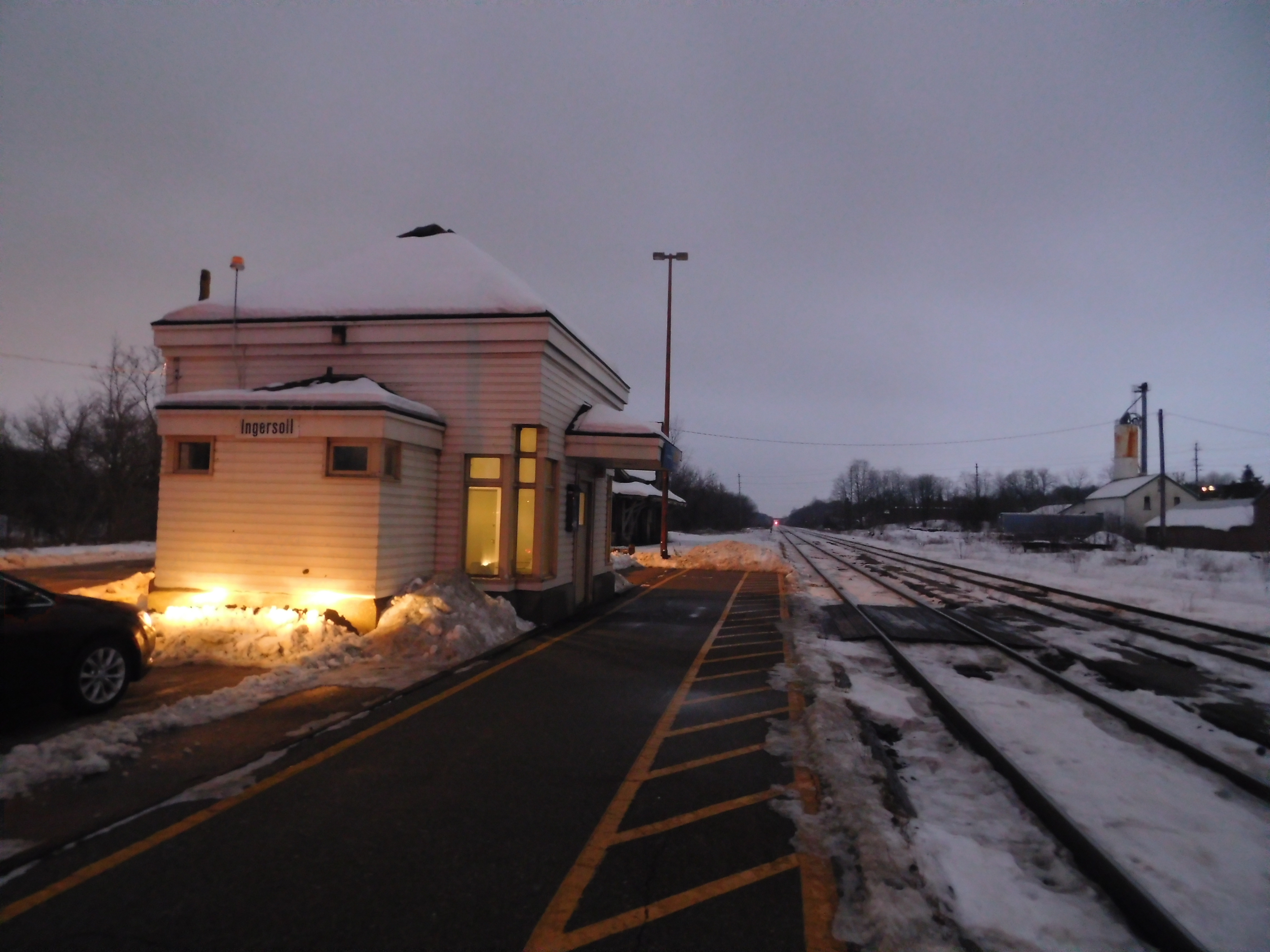
The Ingersoll station at dusk in December 2016

Being one of Ingersoll's few remaining significant historic buildings, it was in the municipal heritage inventory, but it was not designated under the Ontario Heritage Act. The building was boarded up and not been protected or restored. It was demolished at the bequest of Town of Ingersoll officials after many decades of neglect and decay.

It was referenced in Planning for Heritage Railway Stations: Inventory where it was described as follows: "The Ingersoll station was modelled after the Woodstock station and features a steeply pitched cross-gabled roof with overhang and large wooden brackets. The station is architecturally significant and is a very good example of the Gothic Revival style adapted for a smaller station. It was evaluated as Heritage Class B".

The original station was demolished on December 7, 2020, since it posed as a "safety hazard to the community".
