= Woodstock station (Ontario) =

Railway station in Ontario, Canada

Woodstock
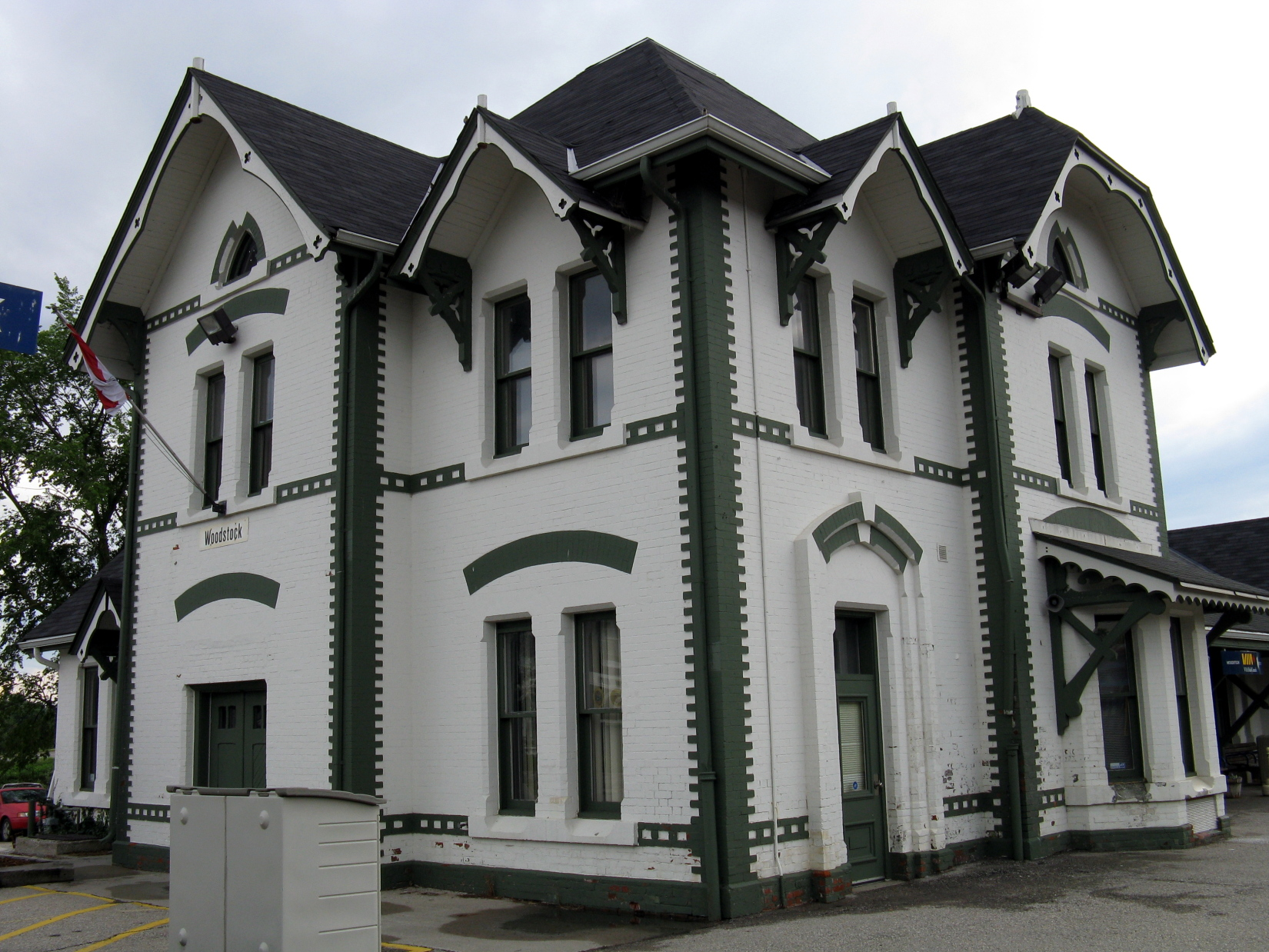
- Exterior of the heritage station building

General information
- Location: 100 Victoria Street South, Woodstock, Ontario; Canada
- Coordinates: 43°07′35″N 80°45′07″W
- Owner: Via Rail
- Platforms: 1 side platform, 1 island platform
- Tracks: 2

Construction
- Structure type: Unstaffed station
- Parking: Yes
- Accessible: Yes
- Architect: Joseph Hobson

History
- Opened: 1885

Services
Preceding station	Via Rail	Following station
Ingersoll toward Windsor	Windsor–Toronto	Brantford toward Toronto
Former services
Preceding station	Amtrak	Following station
Ingersoll toward Chicago	International 1982–1990	Brantford toward Toronto
Preceding station	Canadian National Railway	Following station
Beachville toward Sarnia	Grand Trunk Railway; Main Line	Eastwood toward Montreal

Heritage Railway Station (Canada)
- Designated: 1993
- Reference no.: 4610
Location

Woodstock railway station in Woodstock, Ontario, Canada, is a railway station for Via Rail trains running from Toronto west to Windsor.

The station is located between Wellington and Bay Streets. Trains are wheelchair accessible (immediate for eastbound passengers but 24 hours' notice required for westbound passengers). It opens as a shelter 30 minutes prior to train arrival and remains open for 30 minutes after train departure. The ticket counter has been replaced by a self-service kiosk. There is free outdoor parking on the premises.

Nearby attractions include Southside Park and the Woodstock Museum.

== History ==
The station was built in 1885 by the Grand Trunk Railway after its acquisition of the Great Western Railway, which was purchased in 1882 and ultimately merged into the Canadian National Railway in 1920. The building is Gothic Revival with Italianate elements by architect Joseph Hobson and renovated in 1986 with Edwardian themed interior/exterior. The station building was designated a Heritage Railway Station in 1993.

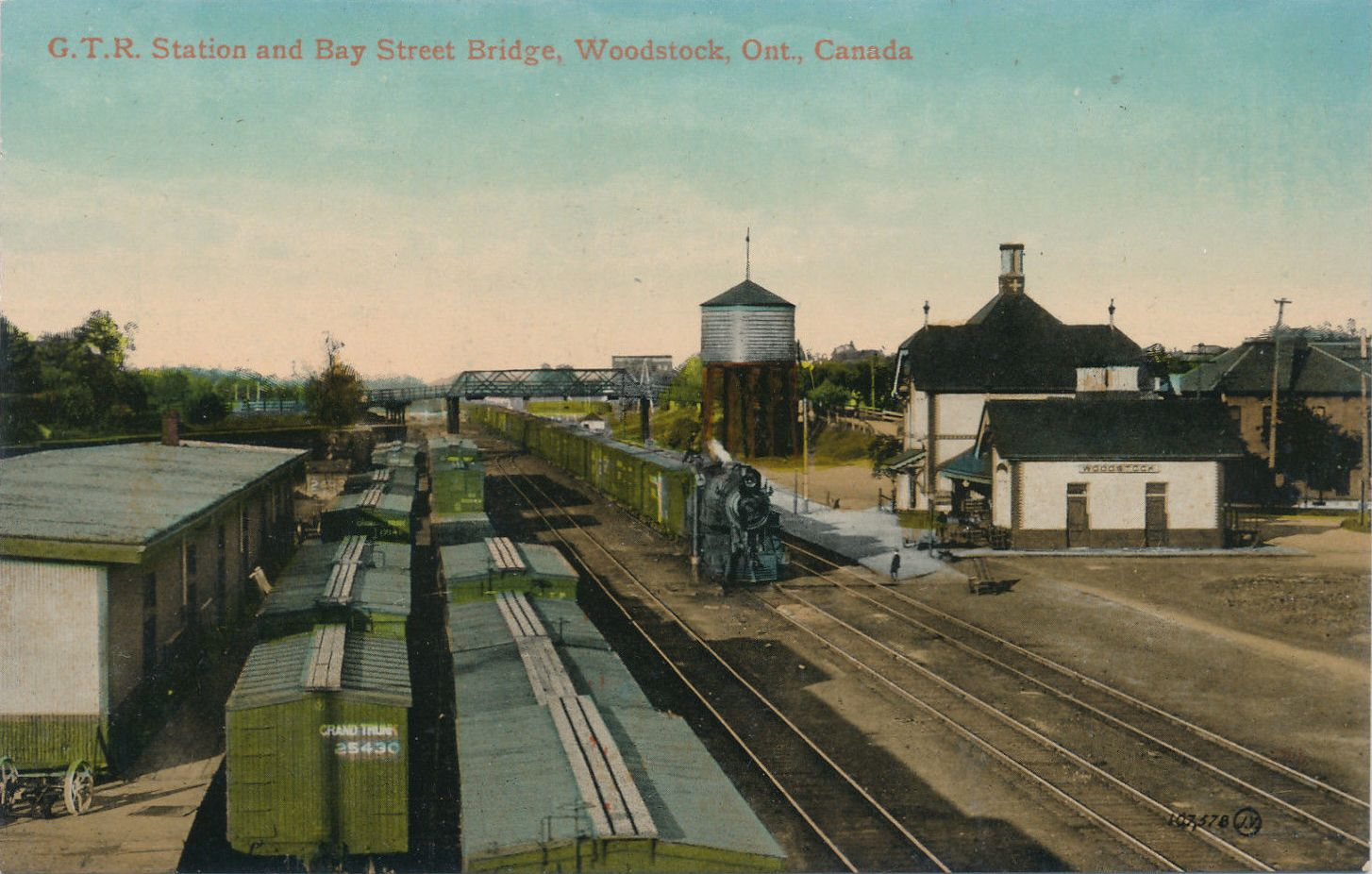
Looking east towards the station and the former Bay Street bridge, in 1913

== See also ==
- List of designated heritage railway stations of Canada
