= Brantford station =

Railway station in Ontario, Canada

Brantford
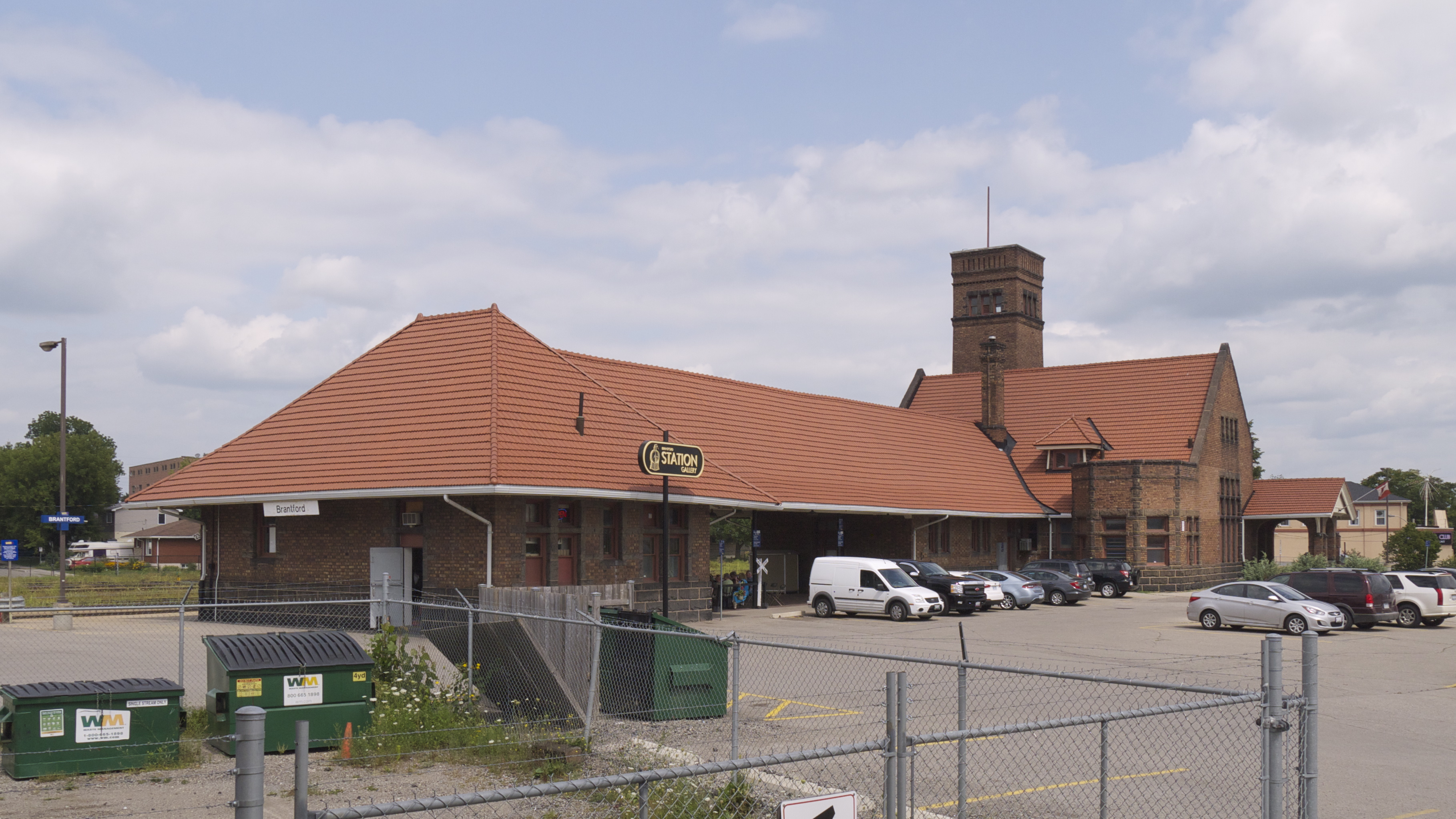

General information
- Location: 5 Wadsworth St., Brantford, Ontario; Canada
- Coordinates: 43°08′48″N 80°15′56″W
- Owner: Via Rail
- Platforms: 1 side platform, 1 island platform
- Tracks: 2

Construction
- Parking: Yes
- Accessible: Yes

Other information
- Status: Staffed station

History
- Opened: 1905
- Rebuilt: 2002

Services
Preceding station	Via Rail	Following station
Woodstock toward Windsor	Windsor–Toronto	Aldershot toward Toronto
Former services
Preceding station	Amtrak	Following station
Woodstock toward Chicago	International 1982–1990	Dundas toward Toronto
Preceding station	Canadian National Railway	Following station
Paris toward Sarnia	Grand Trunk Railway; Main Line	Lynden toward Montreal
Paris toward Stratford	Stratford – Fort Erie	Cainsville toward Fort Erie
Colborne Street toward Tillsonburg Junction	Tillsonburg – Brantford	Terminus

Heritage Railway Station (Canada)
- Designated: 1990

Ontario Heritage Act
- Official name: Canadian National Railways Station
- Designated: 23 February 2006
- Reference no.: 4515
Location

Brantford railway station in Brantford, Ontario, Canada is a railway station serving Via Rail trains running between Toronto and Windsor. The station also serves the nearby towns of Paris and Simcoe.

== History ==
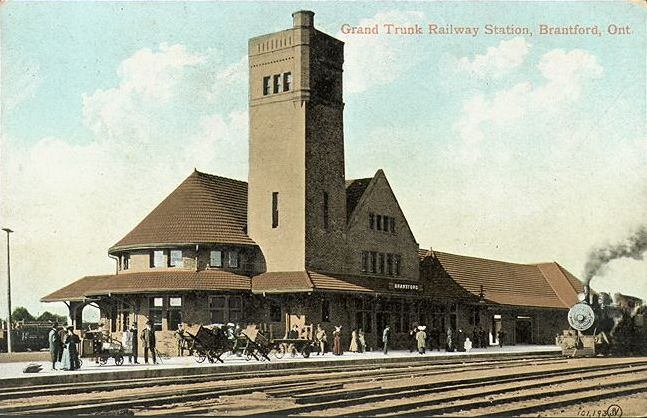
Grand Trunk Railway Station, ca. 1910

The station was built by the Grand Trunk Railway, as designed by architects Spier and Rohns, in 1905.

The station played a key role in Brantford's economic development. It brought markets, materials and labour into the city. Refurbishments for the Brantford railway station came in 2002 when Via Rail spent $350,000 ($574,700 in today's money) to make general improvements to railway service. Ten passenger trains connect Brantford to the major economic hubs of Windsor, Sarnia, Toronto, Montreal, and Ottawa every day.

In 2011, GO Transit indicated in its "GO 2020" plan that peak hour train or bus service could be expanded to Brantford by the year 2020.

== Facilities ==
The station is wheelchair-accessible and is located near the junction of Market, Gray and West Streets. CN Gore Park is the closest park to the railway station, with the Carnegie Library and the Brethour House being other attractions within a reasonable distance of the station. A self-service ticketing kiosk allows people to print out their own tickets.

The station building includes the Brantford Station Gallery, an art gallery & coffee shop featuring live music, which is open to travellers.

Brantford Transit provides transit access to and from the railway station. Short-term and long-term automobile parking are available for a fee as of August 1, 2012; previously the parking had been free to use. Increased use of railway services has been the primary reason for this change in parking policy.

== See also ==
- List of designated heritage railway stations of Canada
