= St. Marys station (Ontario) =

Railway station in St. Marys, Canada

St. Marys
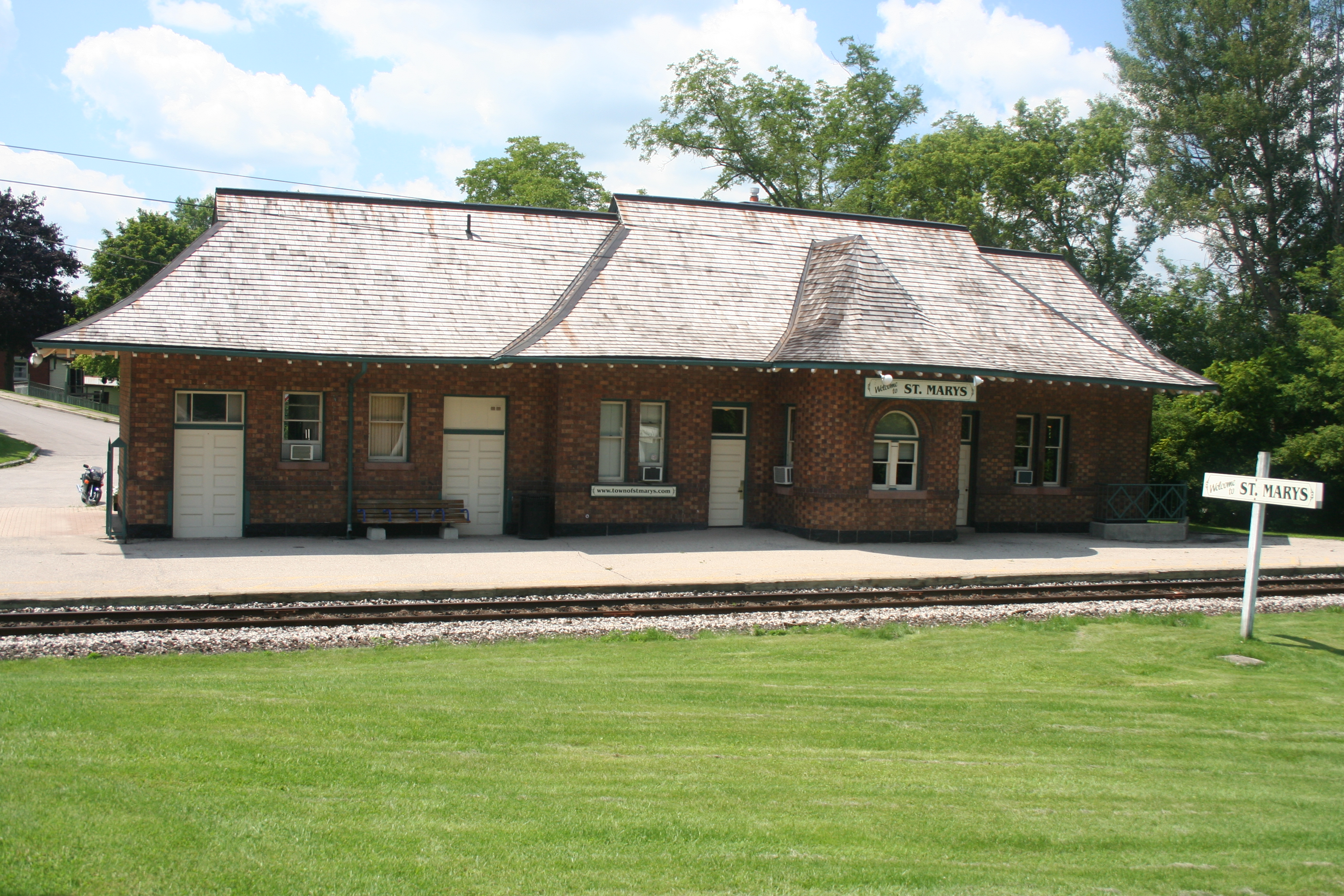

General information
- Location: 5 James Street North, St. Marys, Ontario; Canada
- Coordinates: 43.2604°N 81.1365°W
- Owner: Town of St Marys
- Platforms: 1 side platform
- Tracks: 1

Construction
- Structure type: Staffed station
- Parking: Yes
- Accessible: Yes

Other information
- Station code: GO Transit: SM

History
- Opened: 1907

Services
Preceding station	Via Rail	Following station
London toward Sarnia	Sarnia–Toronto	Stratford toward Toronto
Former services
Preceding station	GO Transit	Following station
London Terminus	Kitchener (express, 2021-2023)	Stratford towards Union
Preceding station	Amtrak	Following station
London toward Chicago	International	Stratford toward Toronto
Preceding station	Canadian National Railway	Following station
Kellys toward London	London – Stratford	St. Marys Junction toward Stratford

Ontario Heritage Act
- Official name: Grand Trunk Railway Station
- Designated: 1987
Location

St. Marys station in St. Marys, Ontario, Canada is a staffed railway station used by Via Rail's Corridor intercity train service. The station is served by one daily train in each direction between Toronto and Sarnia via London.

== History ==
St. Marys station was opened in 1907 by the Grand Trunk Railway to provide convenient access to the town centre of St. Marys. The station architect was E. Chandler of Stratford, Ontario. When the Grand Trunk Railway (GTR) was built in 1858, St. Marys was served only by St. Marys Junction station, located 1.5 km north of the current station in an otherwise undeveloped area. Following pressure from local residents to provide a convenient station closer to the town centre, the GTR opened St. Marys Town station in 1879, located roughly 400 metres south of the current station where the railway crosses James Street South. However, residents were still not satisfied with the location, leading to the GTR constructing the present St. Marys station in 1907, replacing St. Marys Town.

In the 1980s, the Town of St. Marys acquired ownership of the station to protect it from possible closure or demolition. It completed a restoration and renovation of the station building, with an official reopening on September 26, 1988. The station is designated under Part IV of the Ontario Heritage Act since 1987.

On October 18, 2021, GO Transit started weekday train service though St. Mary's, with one daily round trip between Toronto and London via the Kitchener line. Two years later in October 2023, the service was discontinued.

== Station facilities ==
The station consists of a single side platform serving a single track. St Marys station is owned and maintained by the Town of St Marys as a gallery/recreation centre.

In addition to ticketing and waiting facilities, the station building houses the St Marys Station Gallery.

== See also ==
- Quebec City–Windsor Corridor (Via Rail) – trans-provincial passenger rail corridor which includes St. Marys
- Rail transport in Ontario
