= Aldershot station =

Aldershot station may refer to:

- Aldershot railway station, Aldershot, England, United Kingdom
- Aldershot GO Station, Burlington, Ontario, Canada
