= Strathroy station =

Railway station in Ontario, Canada

Strathroy
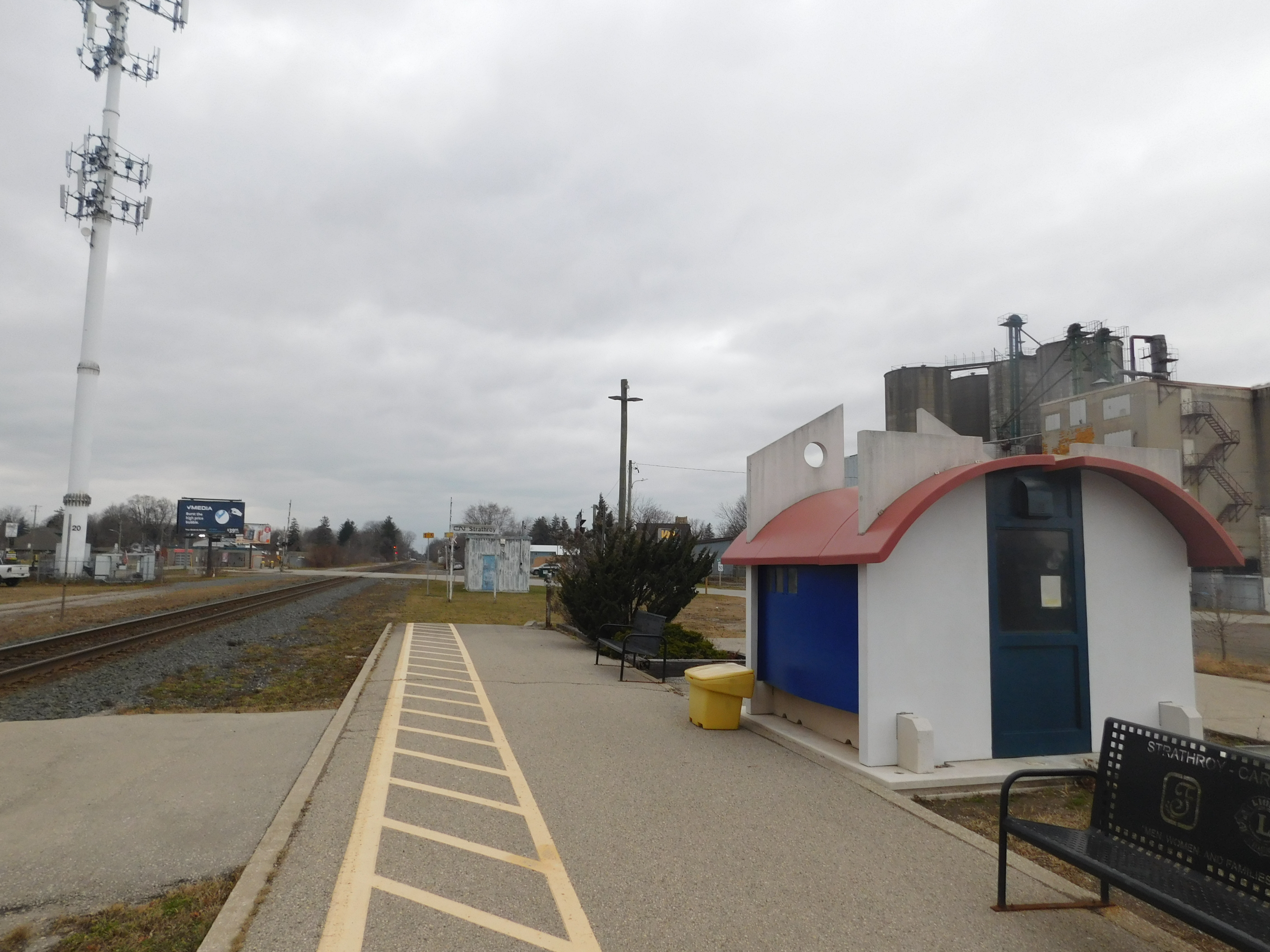
- Strathroy station in November 2022.

General information
- Location: Strathroy-Caradoc, ON; Canada
- Coordinates: 42.9548°N 81.6230°W
- Owner: Via Rail
- Platforms: 1 side platform
- Tracks: 1 (formerly 2)

Construction
- Structure type: Shelter
- Parking: Yes
- Accessible: Yes

History
- Opened: 2004

Services
Preceding station	Via Rail	Following station
Wyoming toward Sarnia	Sarnia–Toronto	London toward Toronto
Former services
Preceding station	Amtrak	Following station
Sarnia toward Chicago	International	London toward Toronto
Preceding station	Canadian National Railway	Following station
Kerwood toward Sarnia	Grand Trunk Railway; Main Line	Komoka toward Montreal
Location

Strathroy station is a railway station in Strathroy-Caradoc, Ontario, Canada. It is a stop on Via Rail's Toronto–Sarnia train route. The station is wheelchair accessible. It has an enclosed, unheated shelter and used to be opened 1 hour before and 1 hour after trains. The station is rarely opened now due to high levels of vandalism. Two trains service Strathroy daily, VIA 84 (eastbound) at 09:27 and VIA 87 (westbound) at 21:37. Reservations are required 40 minutes in advance in order for a train to stop at this station.

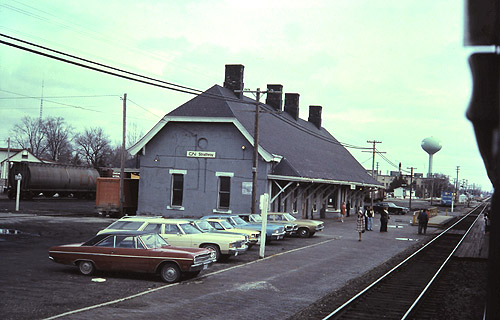
The former depot at the Strathroy railway station in 1975

The International Limited was operated jointly by Via Rail and Amtrak between Chicago and Toronto. The service operated from 1982–2004.

== See also ==
- Quebec City–Windsor Corridor (Via Rail) – trans-provincial passenger rail corridor which includes Strathroy
- Rail transport in Ontario
