= Grimsby station (Via Rail) =

Railway station in Ontario, Canada

Grimsby
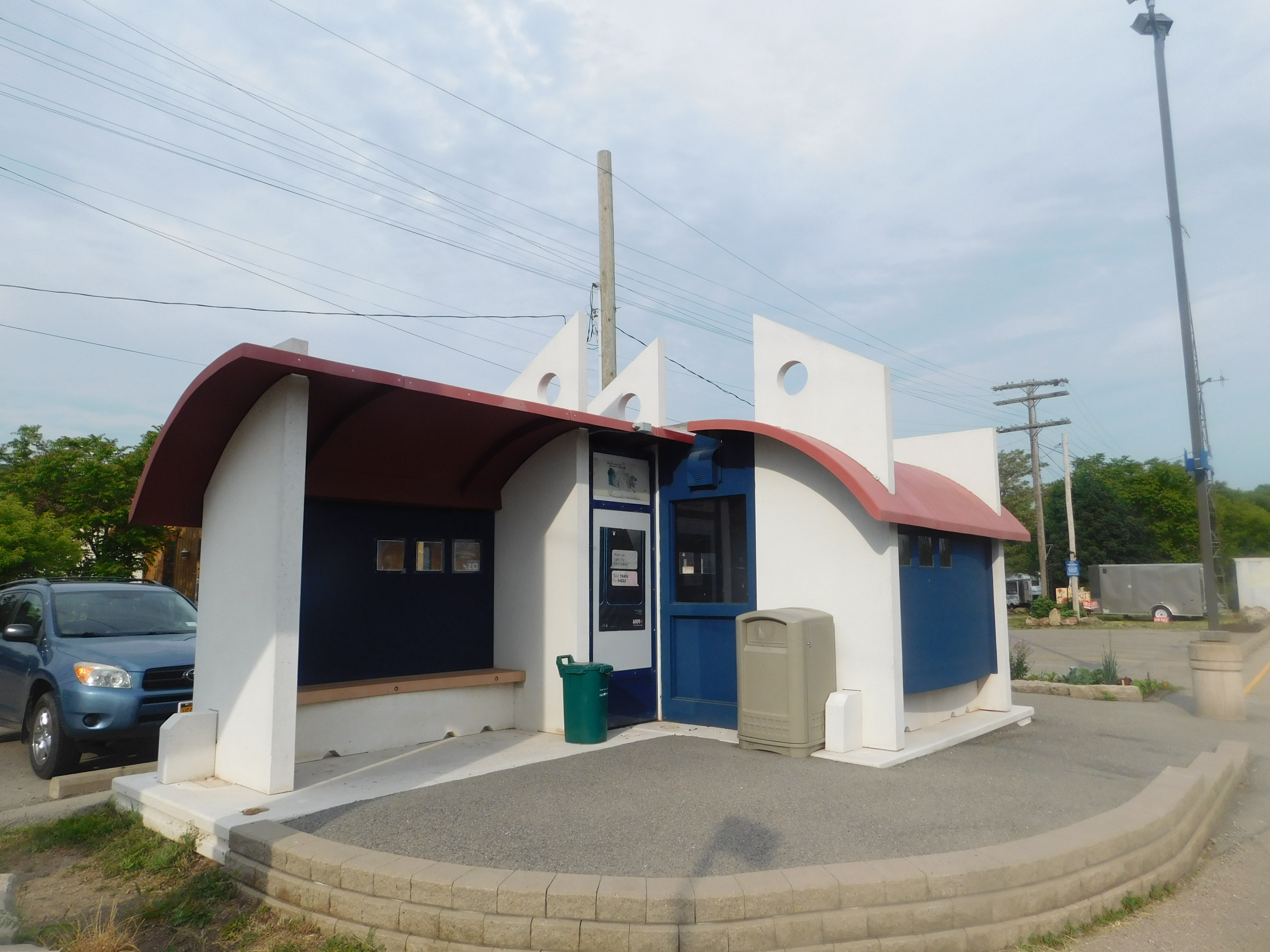

General information
- Location: 99 Ontario Street; Grimsby, Ontario; Canada
- Coordinates: 43°11′45″N 79°33′28″W
- Owner: Via Rail
- Tracks: 2

Construction
- Structure type: Shelter
- Parking: Yes
- Accessible: yes

Other information
- Station code: Via Rail: GRIM; Amtrak: GMS

History
- Opened: 1902
- Rebuilt: Late 1990s

Services
Preceding station	Via Rail	Following station
Aldershot toward Toronto	Maple Leaf	St. Catharines toward New York
Former services
Preceding station	Via Rail	Following station
Hamilton Closed 1993 toward Toronto	Maple Leaf	St. Catharines toward New York
Preceding station	Canadian National Railway	Following station
Winowa toward Toronto	Niagara Falls – Toronto; Local stops	Grimsby Beach toward Suspension Bridge
Location

Grimsby station is a railway station in Grimsby, Ontario, Canada. It is served by the Maple Leaf train between Toronto and New York City.

The Maple Leaf is a joint Amtrak–Via Rail service: ticketing is shared, and trains consist of Amtrak equipment but are operated on the Toronto–Niagara Falls portion of the route by Via crews. The station was formerly served by additional Via trains operating as part of Corridor services, but these were discontinued in 2012.

The station is an accessible, unstaffed, but heated shelter beside the tracks replaced a small wooden shed. Parking is free.

== History ==
=== Original station (1853) ===
The original Great Western Railway station, built in 1853, was moved further back from the tracks in the late 1800s, is unoccupied as of early 2021 and was most recently used by the Fork Road Pottery from 1997 until 2018. It had also been used previously as a fruit depot and meat packing depot.

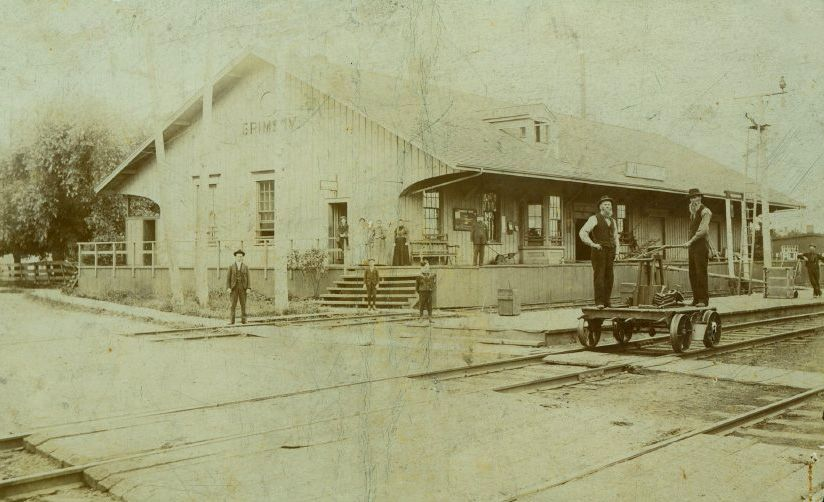
Original GWR station in 1855

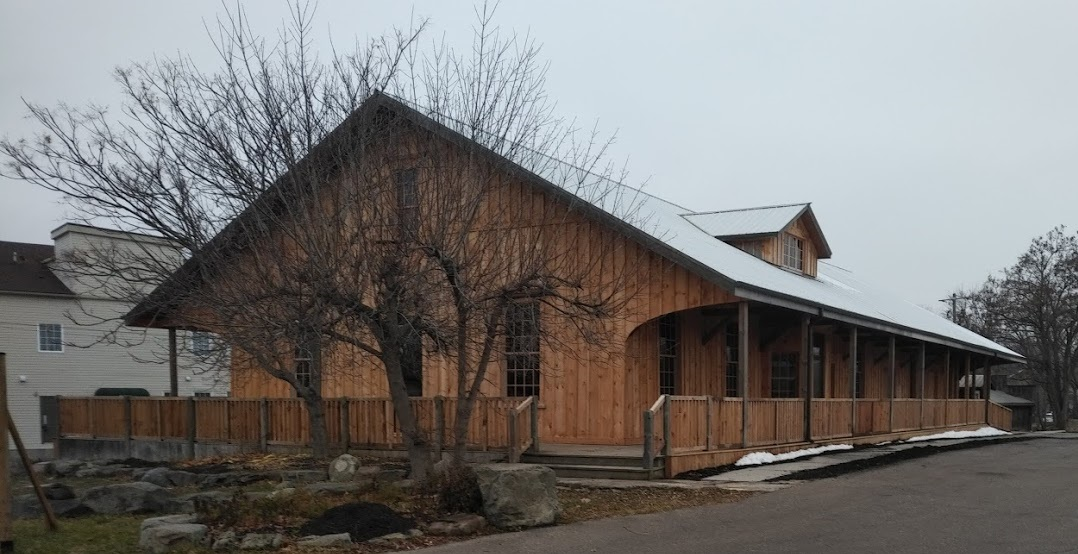
Original GWR station in December 2020

=== Other buildings ===
The second GWR station burned down in 1900 and was replaced by a third in 1902. That historic railway station building had two towers and was destroyed by an electrical fire in 1994. That building was concurrently in use as a restaurant between 1979 and 1994. The current Via Rail shelter was built in the 1990s.

== See also ==
- Grimsby GO Station
