= Glencoe station (Ontario) =

Railway station in Ontario, Canada

Glencoe
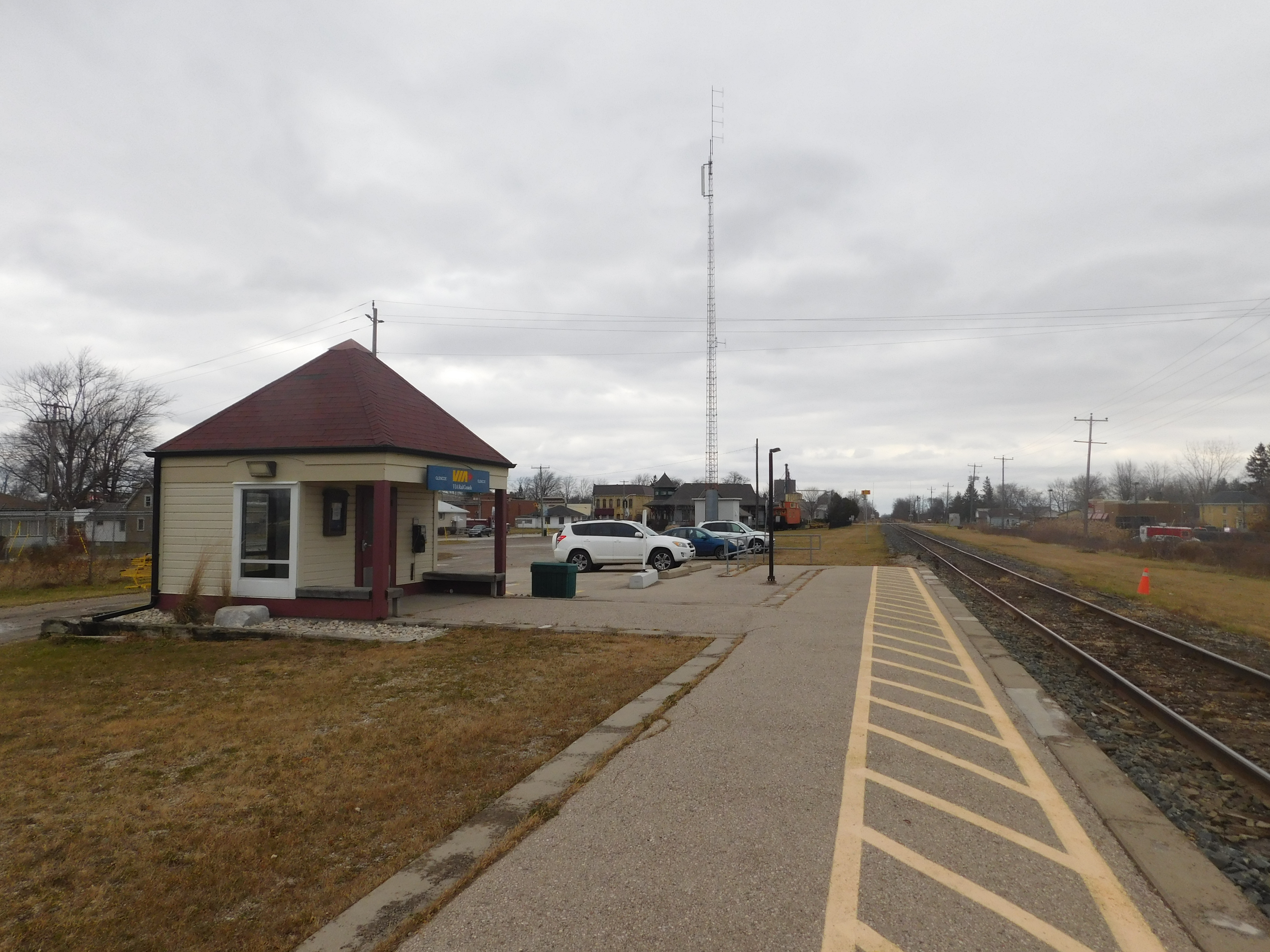
- The Via Rail platform at Glencoe in November 2022.

General information
- Location: 151 McRae Street, Glencoe, Ontario; Canada
- Coordinates: 42.7466°N 81.7115°W
- Owner: Via Rail
- Platforms: 1 side platform
- Tracks: 1

Construction
- Structure type: Unstaffed station
- Parking: Yes
- Accessible: Yes

History
- Opened: 1904
- Rebuilt: 2001

Services
Preceding station	Via Rail	Following station
Chatham toward Windsor	Windsor–Toronto	London toward Toronto
Former services
Preceding station	Canadian National Railway	Following station
Newbury toward Detroit	London – Detroit	Appin toward London
Location

Glencoe railway station in Glencoe, Ontario, Canada is serviced by Via Rail trains operating between Toronto and Windsor. The station is wheelchair-accessible.

== History ==
The original station was built in 1854 as a stop on the Great Western Railway. Two years later the log structure was replaced (1856) and then again in 1900 by the Wabash-Grand Trunk Railway due to demands on the busy station.

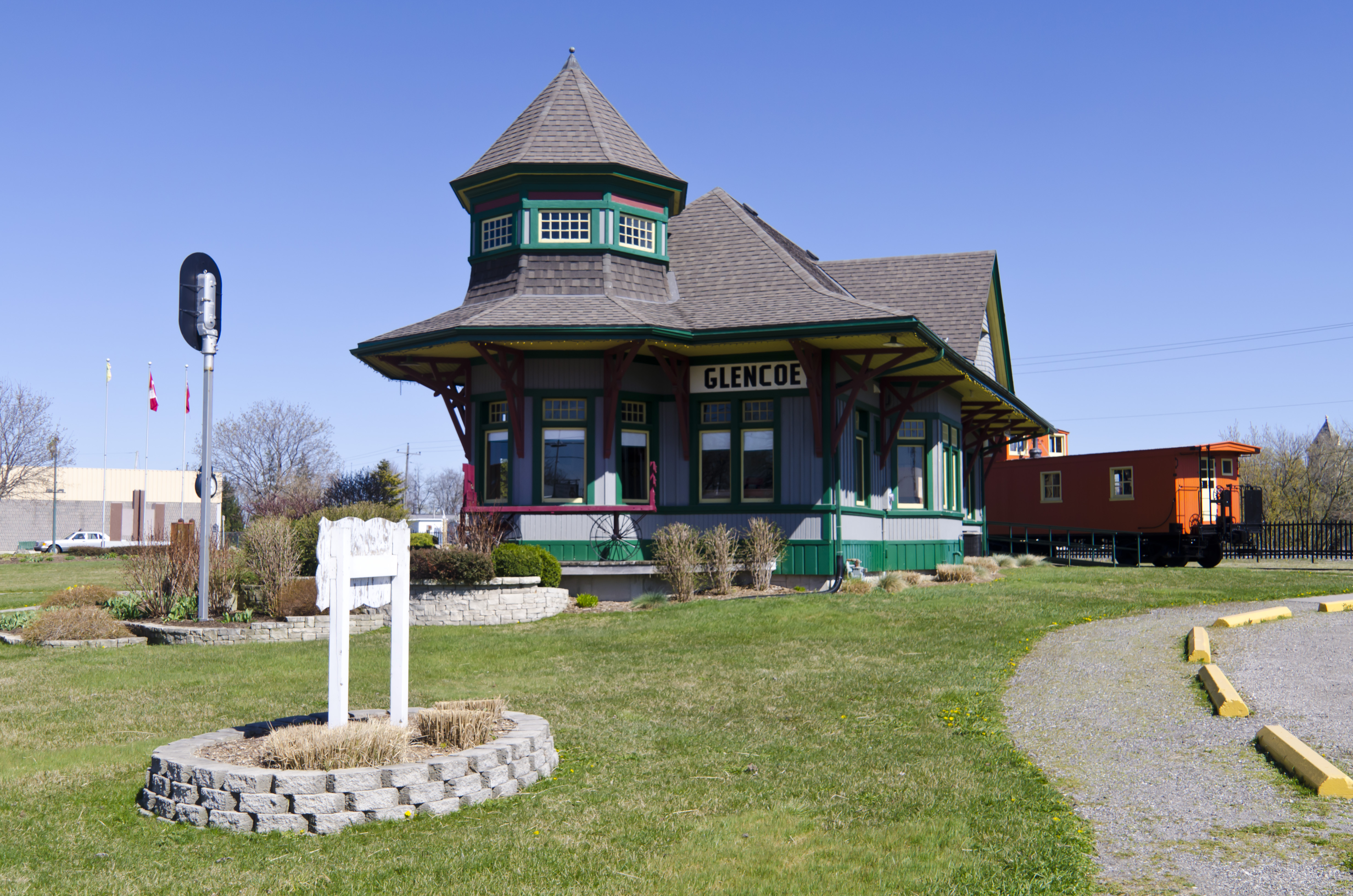
The 1904 Grand Trunk station east of the active platform

The 1904, the sixth and present station was built using Queen Anne Revival architecture.

The Glencoe Station has been restored to pristine condition. Inside the building is a metal ceiling with pine trim. The ladies waiting room is on the east end with the men's waiting room on the west end. It was proper in at the time the station was built that single men were required to wait in a separate room from ladies and families. Also in the west end was the baggage facilities with the station master's office located in the centre.

In 2010, the Glencoe Railway Station was inducted into the North America Railway Hall of Fame in the category of "Facilities and Structures: National" for having made significant contributions or achievements relating to the railway industry.
