= Chatham station (Ontario) =

Railway station in Ontario, Canada

Chatham
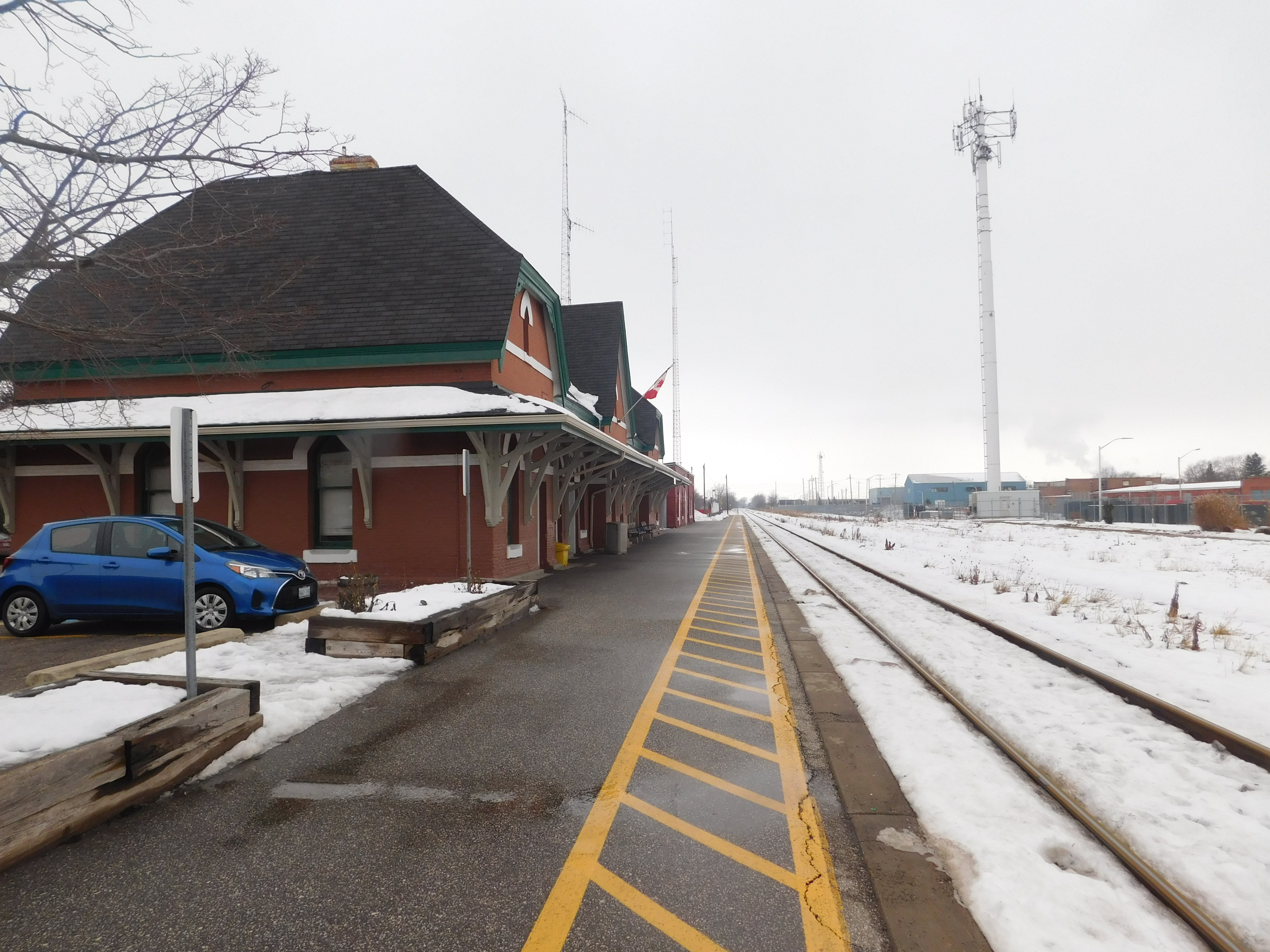
- The Chatham depot in December 2016.

General information
- Location: 360 Queen Street; Chatham, Ontario; Canada
- Coordinates: 42°23′50″N 82°10′47″W
- Owner: Via Rail
- Platforms: 1 side platform
- Tracks: 1

Construction
- Structure type: Unstaffed station
- Parking: Yes
- Accessible: Yes

History
- Opened: 1879

Services
Preceding station	Via Rail	Following station
Windsor Terminus	Windsor–Toronto	Glencoe toward Toronto
Former services
Preceding station	Canadian National Railway	Following station
Prairie Siding toward Detroit	London – Detroit	Northwood toward London
Location

Chatham station is a train station in Chatham, Ontario, Canada, served by Via Rail trains running between Toronto and Windsor. The station is wheelchair accessible.

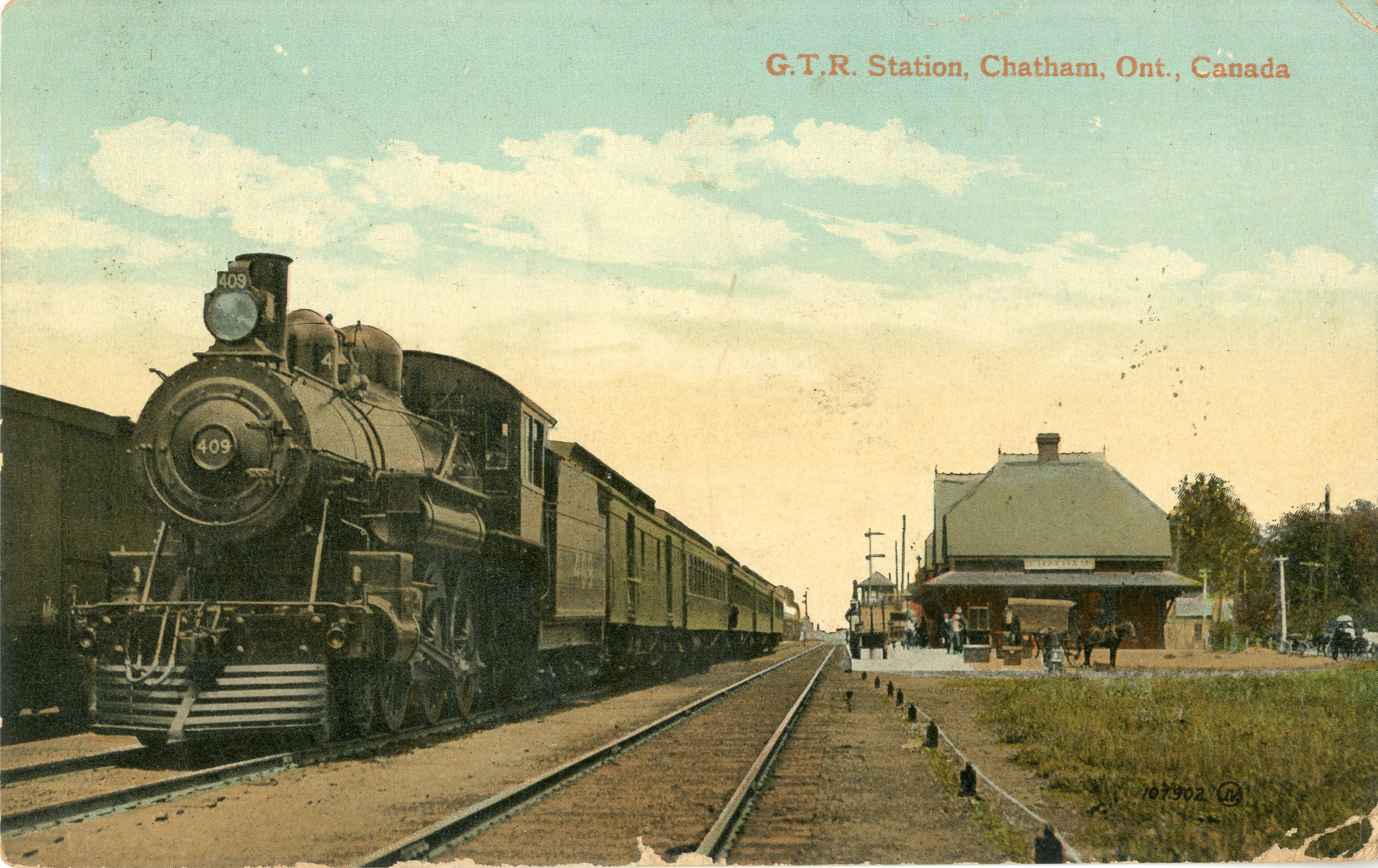
Postcard showing a train at the station, circa 1912.

The Canadian National Railways/VIA Rail Station at Chatham is a one-and-a-half-storey, brick railway station, built in 1912 to replace a station built in 1879. It is located in a mixed commercial area, south of the city centre of Chatham-Kent. The station is protected under the Heritage Railway Stations Protection Act.

== See also ==
- List of designated heritage railway stations of Canada
