= Wyoming station (Ontario) =

Railway station in Ontario, Canada

Wyoming
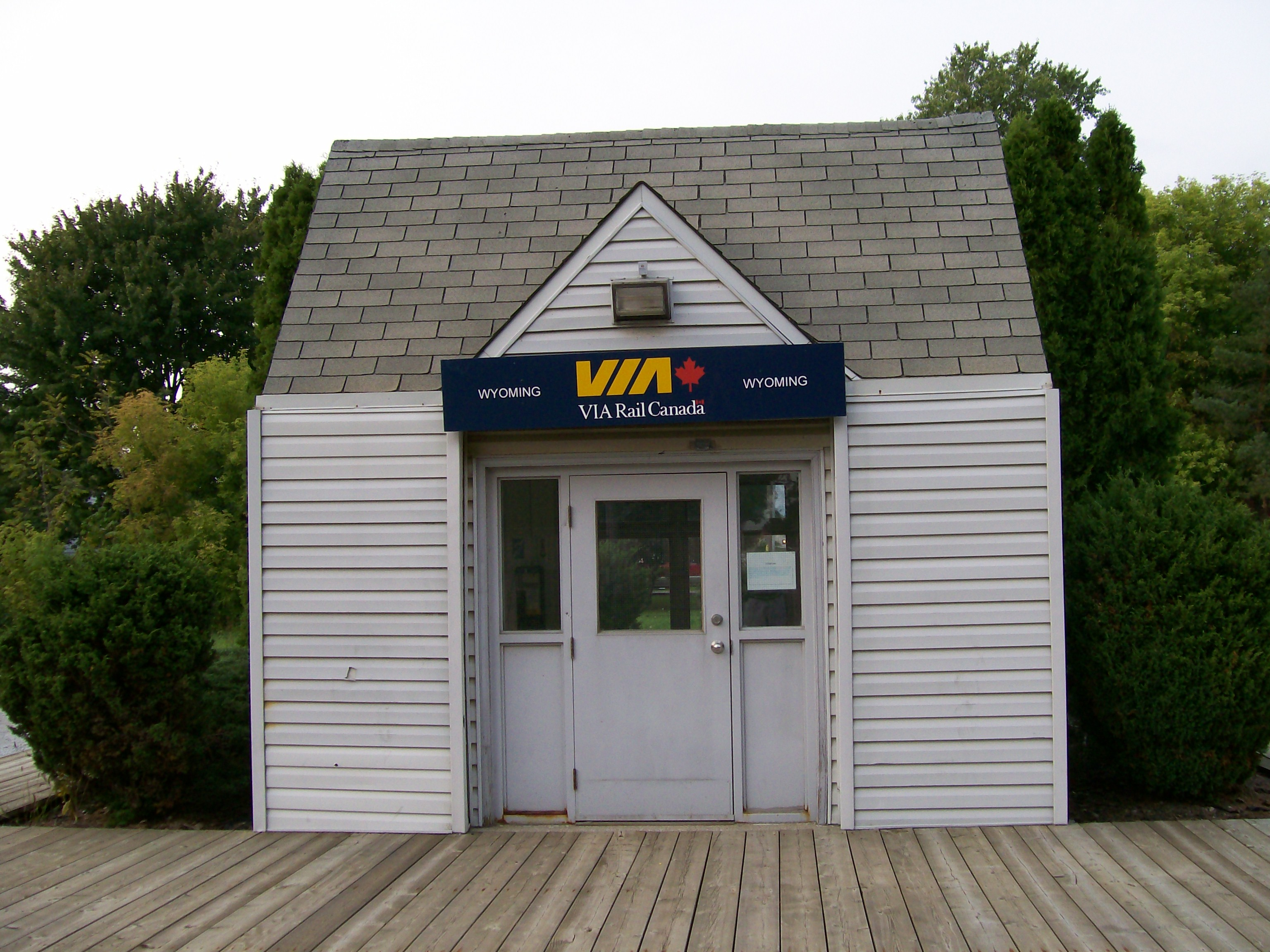
- Wyoming, Ontario Via station

General information
- Location: Broadway Street; Wyoming, Ontario; Canada
- Coordinates: 42.9481°N 82.1205°W
- Owner: Via Rail
- Platforms: 1 side platform
- Tracks: 1

Construction
- Structure type: Shelter
- Parking: Yes
- Accessible: Yes

Services
Preceding station	Via Rail	Following station
Sarnia Terminus	Sarnia–Toronto	Strathroy toward Toronto
Former services
Preceding station	Canadian National Railway	Following station
Mandaumin toward Sarnia	Grand Trunk Railway; Main Line	Wanstead toward Montreal
Location

Wyoming railway station is a railway station in Plympton–Wyoming in Lambton County, Ontario, Canada. It is a stop on Via Rail's Toronto–Sarnia train route. The station is wheelchair accessible. The shelter is set back off of Broadway Street in downtown Wyoming. Train 84 stops in Wyoming at 08:56 and Train 87 stops at 22:05, seven days a week. Reservations are required 40 minutes in advance for trains 84 and 87 to stop at this location.

== See also ==
- Quebec City–Windsor Corridor (Via Rail) – trans-provincial passenger rail corridor which includes Wyoming
- Rail transport in Ontario
