= London station (Ontario) =

Intercity train station in London, Ontario

London
- London station in 2026

General information
- Location: 205 York Street, London, ON; Canada
- Coordinates: 42.9819°N 81.2464°W
- Owner: Via Rail
- Platforms: 1 side platform, 1 island platform
- Tracks: 5
- Connections: LTC: 3 Downtown to Argyle Mall via Hamilton; 4 Fanshawe College to White Oaks Mall; 5 Byron to Argyle Mall; 6 University Hospital to Parkwood Institution; 13 Masonville to White Oaks Mall; 15 Huron Heights to Westmount Mall; 90 Express Route from Masonville to White Oaks Mall

Construction
- Structure type: Staffed station
- Parking: Yes
- Accessible: Yes

Other information
- Station code: GO Transit: LN
- IATA code: XDQ
- Website: London train station

History
- Opened: 1963
- Rebuilt: 2001

Services
Preceding station	Via Rail	Following station
Strathroy toward Sarnia	Sarnia–Toronto	St. Marys toward Toronto
Glencoe toward Windsor	Windsor–Toronto	Ingersoll toward Toronto
Former services
Preceding station	GO Transit	Following station
Terminus	Kitchener (express, 2021-2023)	St. Marys towards Union
Preceding station	Amtrak	Following station
Strathroy toward Chicago	International	St. Marys 1990–2004 toward Toronto
Strathroy toward Chicago	International	Ingersoll 1982–1990 toward Toronto
Preceding station	Canadian National Railway	Following station
Hyde Park toward Sarnia	Grand Trunk Railway; Main Line	Dorchester toward Montreal
Hyde Park toward Goderich	Goderich – London	Terminus
Terminus	London – Stratford	Pottersburg toward Stratford
Hyde Park toward Detroit	London – Detroit	Terminus
Location
- Location within Southern Ontario Location within Ontario Location within Canada

London station (French: Gare de London, IATA: XDQ) in London, Ontario, Canada is a major interchange for Via Rail trains running from Toronto west to Sarnia and Windsor. The station is a large, modern, wheelchair accessible building on the south end of the city centre, and connects to local public transit bus services.

== History ==
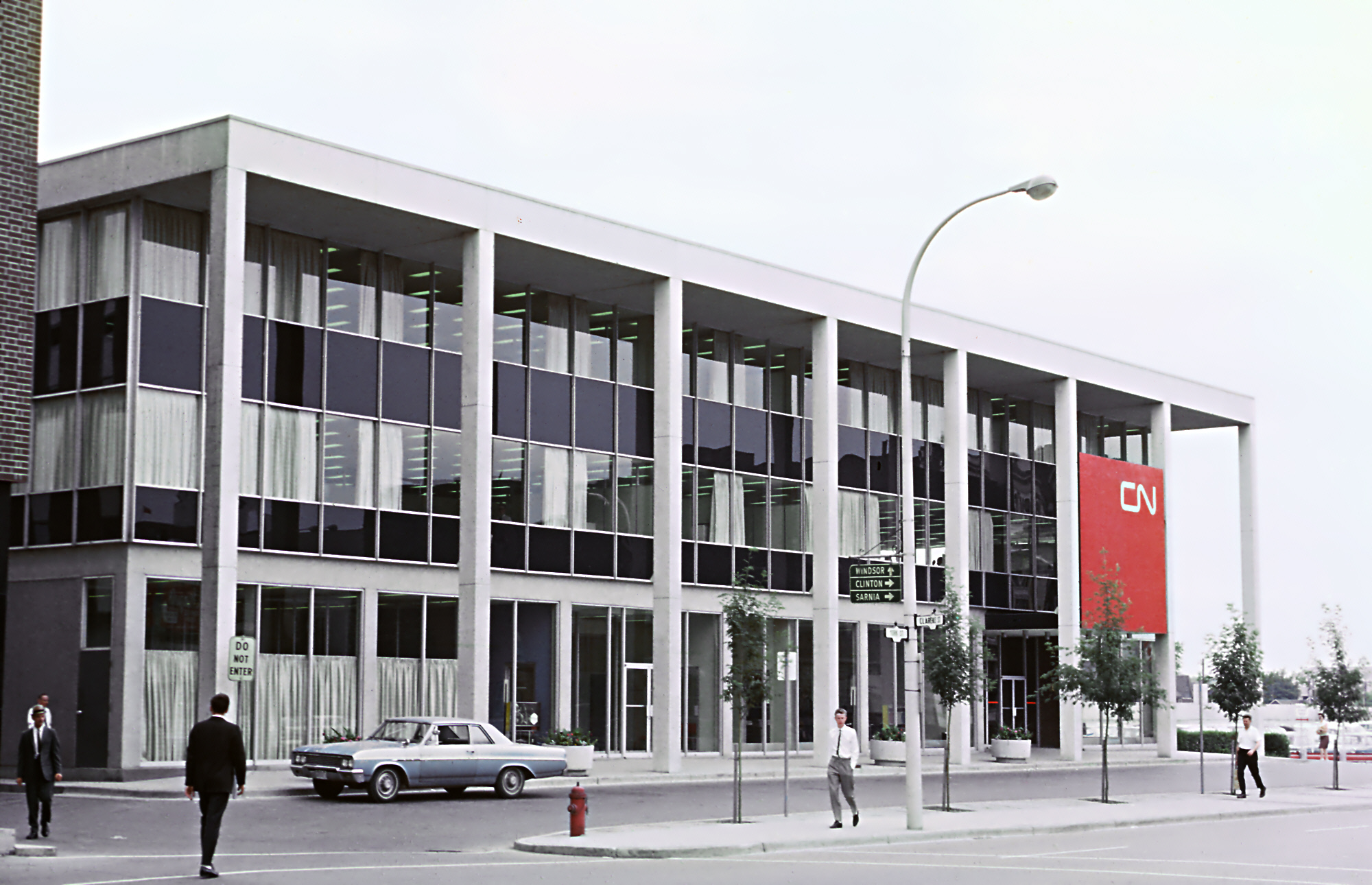
Former CN station in 1966

The first passenger station at this site was completed by Great Western Railway (GWR) in 1853. The station continued to serve the London area for the Grand Trunk Railway after the two companies amalgamated in 1882. The original building survived until 1935 when it was torn down to make way for a new station built by the Canadian National Railway.

The first CN station was demolished and gave way to two structures, a three-storey building at 205 York Street (now home to the CN Credit Union) completed in 1963 and the 10-storey CN Tower Building at 197 York Street built in 1969. The latter building, an International-style structure was closed in 2000 as CN staff dwindled and was imploded at 9:15 a.m., on February 4, 2001. During demolition of the 1969 structure and construction of the present station, train services temporarily reverted to the 1963 station. The old credit union building was incorporated into the current station structure after 2001 and remaining site of the old station became a parking lot. The platform area from the previous stations were retained in the new station.

The International Limited was operated jointly by Via Rail and Amtrak between Chicago and Toronto. The service operated from 1982–2004. The current Corridor service maintains the Canadian section of the International route.

From October 18, 2021 until October 2023, GO Transit operated a single daily round trip between Toronto and London on the Kitchener line commuter rail service on weekdays during the peak periods.

== See also ==
- Quebec City–Windsor Corridor (Via Rail) – trans-provincial passenger rail corridor which includes London
- Rail transport in Ontario
