= Aldershot GO Station =

Railway station in Burlington, Ontario, Canada

Aldershot
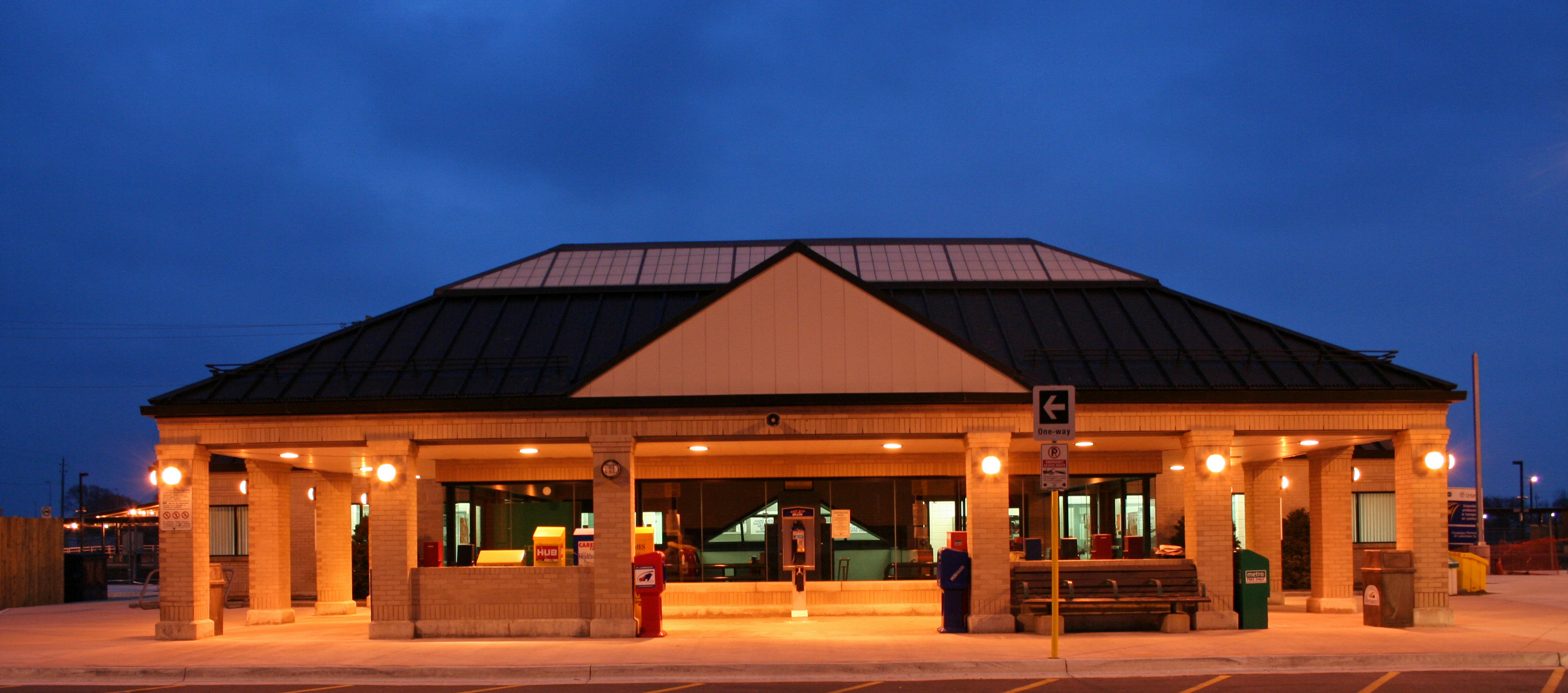

General information
- Location: 1199 Waterdown Road; Burlington, Ontario
- Coordinates: 43°18′48″N 79°51′20″W
- Owner: Metrolinx
- Platforms: 2 side platforms, 1 island platform
- Tracks: 4
- Bus routes: 11 15 17 18
- Connections: Burlington Transit: 4, 87; Hamilton Street Railway: 18

Construction
- Structure type: Station building with a waiting room and public washroom
- Parking: 1,619 spaces
- Cycle facilities: Yes
- Accessible: Yes

Other information
- Status: Unstaffed station
- Station code: GO Transit: AL; Via Rail: ALDR; Amtrak: AST
- Fare zone: 17

History
- Opened: 1855; 171 years ago
- Closed: 1978; 48 years ago
- Rebuilt: 1992; 34 years ago

Services
Preceding station	Via Rail	Following station
Brantford toward Windsor	Windsor–Toronto	Oakville toward Toronto
Grimsby toward New York	Maple Leaf	Oakville toward Toronto
Preceding station	GO Transit	Following station
West Harbour towards Confederation	Lakeshore West	Burlington towards Union
Hamilton Terminus	Lakeshore West (peak express)	Burlington towards Union
West Harbour towards Niagara Falls	Lakeshore West (peak express)	Burlington towards Union
West Harbour towards Niagara Falls	Lakeshore West (off-peak express)	Burlington towards Union
Former services
Preceding station	Canadian National Railway	Following station
Hamilton toward Suspension Bridge	Niagara Falls – Toronto; Local stops	Burlington toward Toronto
Hamilton Terminus	Hamilton – Allandale	Burlington toward Allandale
Location

Aldershot GO Station is a railway station and bus station used by Via Rail and GO Transit, located at Highway 403 and Waterdown Road in the Aldershot community of Burlington, Ontario, Canada.

== History ==
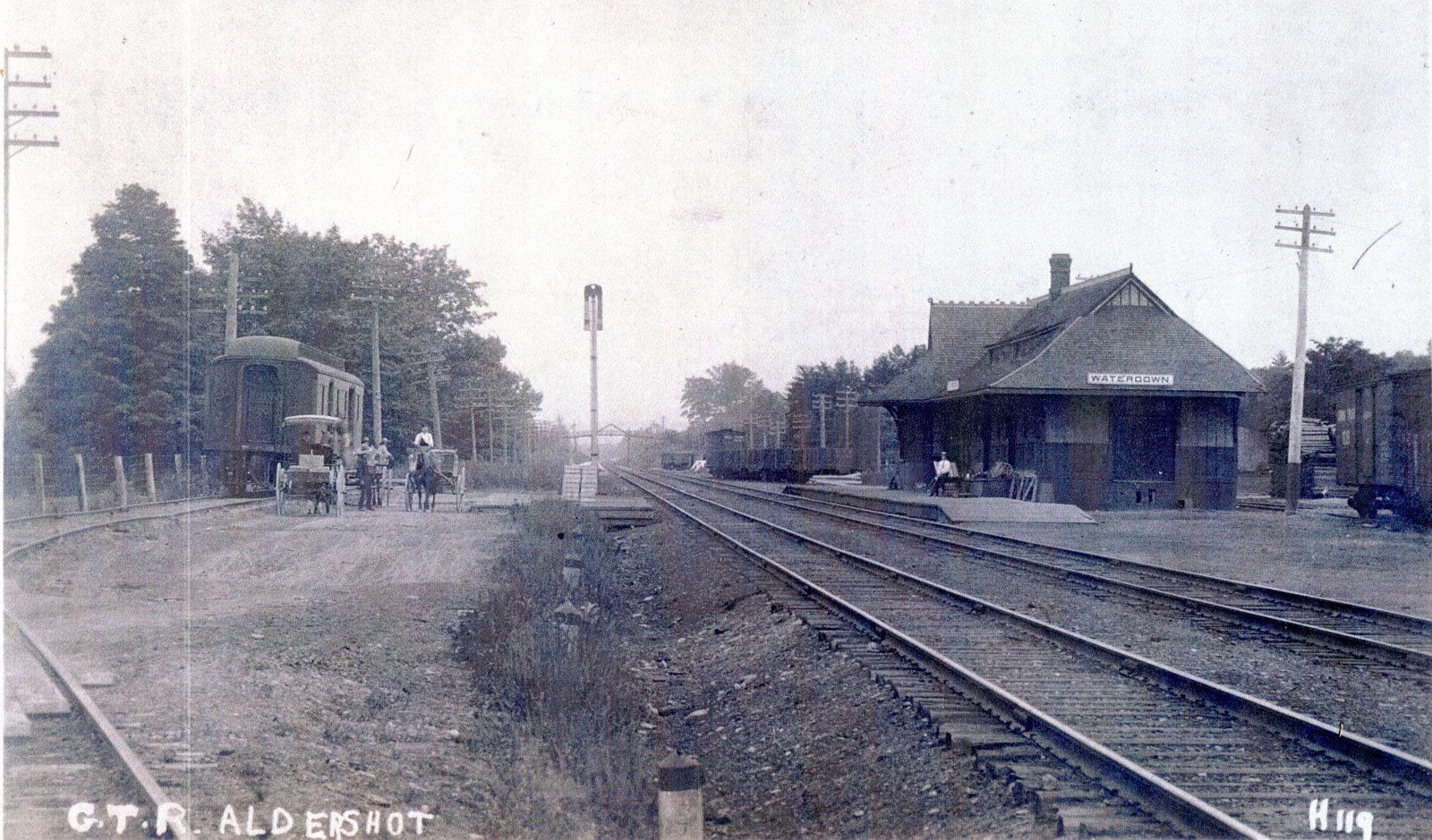
GTR station in 1910 with the sign showing "Waterdown"

The Great Western Railway built the first railway station built here in 1855, a wooden structure consisting of ticket office, waiting room and freight room. It was originally named Waterdown Station, due to its location on Waterdown Road. The Great Western was purchased in 1882 by the Grand Trunk Railway, which replaced the station in the 1890s. In 1912, the Canadian Pacific Railway constructed a rail line from Guelph Junction to Hamilton and built a station in the neighbouring town of Waterdown with the GTR station subsequently renamed after the community of Aldershot, where it is situated. In 1920, the GTR merged into the Canadian National Railway. By the 1950s, passenger travel declined. The station closed in 1978, and was demolished in the 1980s. GO Transit built the current station in 1992.

Until 2022, the southernmost track at the station was a stub siding only connected to the mainline east of the station. Starting in November 2021, Metrolinx had CN extend this siding 200 m (660 ft) westwards to connect with the mainline and enable increased service west of Aldershot. Work was completed in June 2022.

== Services ==
Aldershot is the western terminus of 30-minute service on GO Transit's Lakeshore West line in off-peak hours, with every second train continuing on to West Harbour GO Station and with bus connections available to Hamilton GO Centre and Brantford Bus Terminal. Four trains continue on to Hamilton GO during peak periods. Three trains go to Niagara Falls and return from Niagara Falls every day.

Aldershot is a stop on Via Rail's Quebec City–Windsor Corridor routes between Toronto and Windsor. The station is also served by the joint Via–Amtrak Maple Leaf train, connecting Toronto and New York City through Niagara Falls. It serves as the Via Rail station for Hamilton; Via service to Hamilton CNR Station ended in 1992 when Via consolidated all service between Hamilton and Burlington at Aldershot.

Burlington Transit bus routes 4 Central and 87 North Service – Aldershot as well as Hamilton Street Railway bus route 18 Waterdown Mountaineer serve this station.
