= Quebec City–Windsor Corridor =

Coordinates: 44.34°N 77.08°W

Quebec City–Windsor Corridor Corridor Québec-Windsor (French)
- Region
- Country: Canada
- Province(s): Ontario, Quebec

Area
  - Total: 230,000 km^{2} (89,000 sq mi)

Population (2011 est.)
  - Total: 18,898,000
  - Density: 82.2/km^{2} (213/sq mi)
- Time zone: UTC−5 (EST)
  - Summer (DST): UTC–4 (EDT)
- Postal code prefixes: G, H, J, K, L, M, N
- Area codes: 226, 249, 289, 343, 365, 382, 416, 418, 437, 438, 450, 468, 514, 519, 548, 579, 581, 613, 647, 683, 705, 742, 753, 819, 873, 905

The Quebec City–Windsor Corridor (French: Corridor Québec-Windsor) is the most densely populated and heavily industrialized region of Canada. As its name suggests, the 1,150 km-long (710 mi) region extends from Quebec City in the northeast to Windsor, Ontario in the southwest. With more than 18 million people, it contains about half of the country's population and seven of Canada's 12 largest metropolitan areas, 3 of which are in the top 4 (based on the 2021 census). The name was first popularized by Via Rail, which runs frequent passenger rail service in the region in its service area known as "The Corridor".

== Geography ==
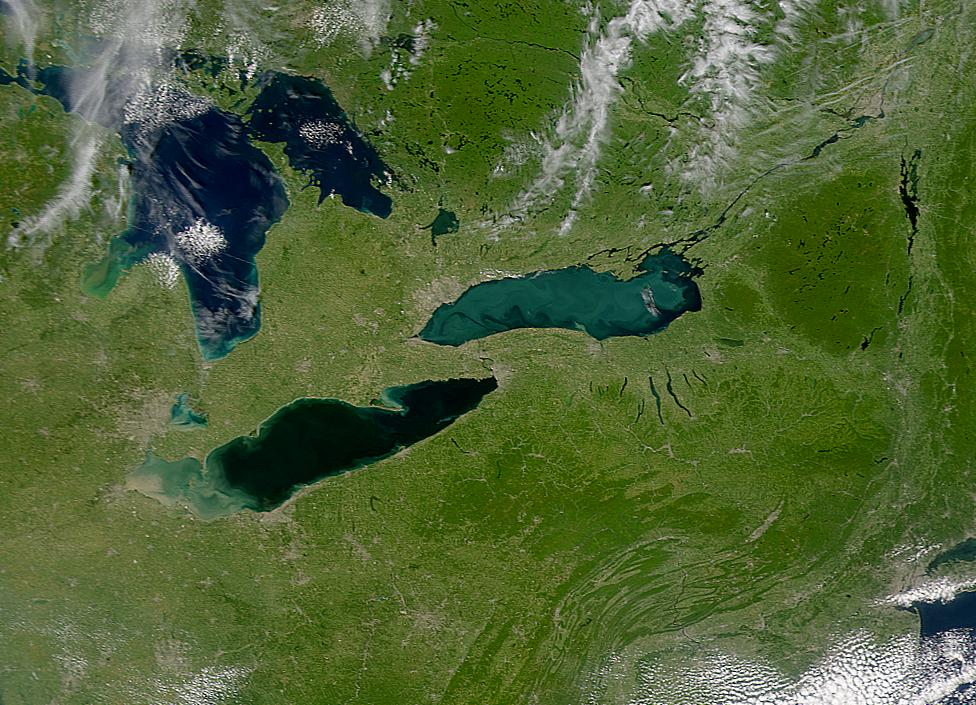
The Montreal–Windsor portion of the Corridor. Most of the Ontario portion of the Corridor is situated immediately north of Lake Erie and Lake Ontario.

The corridor extends from Quebec City, Quebec, in the northeast to Windsor, Ontario, in the southwest, running north of the Saint Lawrence River, Lake Ontario and Lake Erie. For most of its length, the corridor runs through a narrow strip of farmland with the Canadian Shield to the north and the Appalachian Mountains or the Great Lakes to the south. A drive of only a few minutes north from cities or towns along the eastern two-thirds of the corridor will show an abrupt change from flat farmland and limestone bedrock to the granite hills of the shield. The highways in this part of the corridor often run right on the boundary of the shield, and it is possible to observe the frequent change from limestone to granite in rockcuts along the way. There are, however, several wider areas of flat farmland, including the southwestern Ontario Peninsula between Lake Huron and Lake Erie (which makes up the western third of the corridor), the eastern Ontario delta from Ottawa to the junction of the Ottawa and St. Lawrence Rivers at Montreal, and the Eastern Townships southeast of Montreal. There is also a minor Great Lakes corridor of stratified limestone called the Niagara Escarpment.

Because of the moderating influence of the Great Lakes and the frequent influx of warm, moist air from the Gulf of Mexico, the corridor—particularly the western half—has a markedly warmer climate than the rest of Quebec and Ontario. The rich soil and the warm climate mean that the flora and fauna in the corridor are similar to those in the deciduous forests of the eastern United States as far south as Virginia, rather than the evergreen boreal forest that covers most of central Canada up to the Arctic. The forest in southwestern Ontario is often referred to as Carolinian forest.

== Population ==
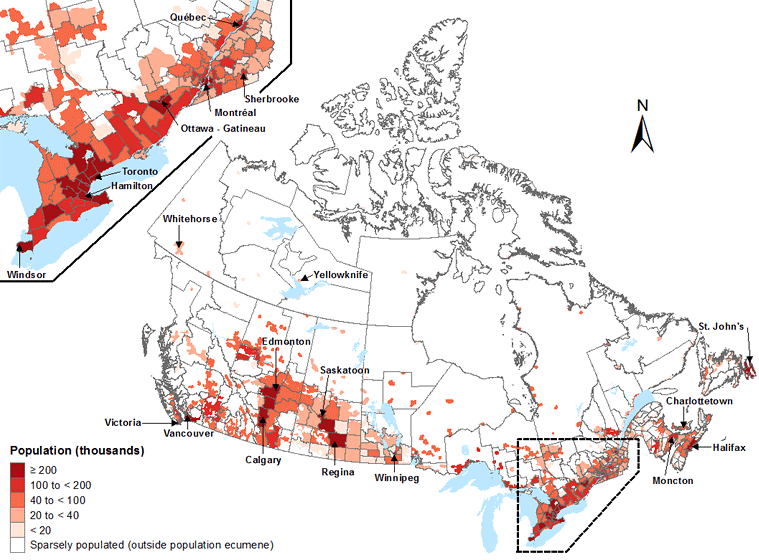
Canada population density map (2014) Top left: The Quebec City–Windsor Corridor is the most densely inhabited and heavily industrialized region accounting for nearly 50 percent of the total population

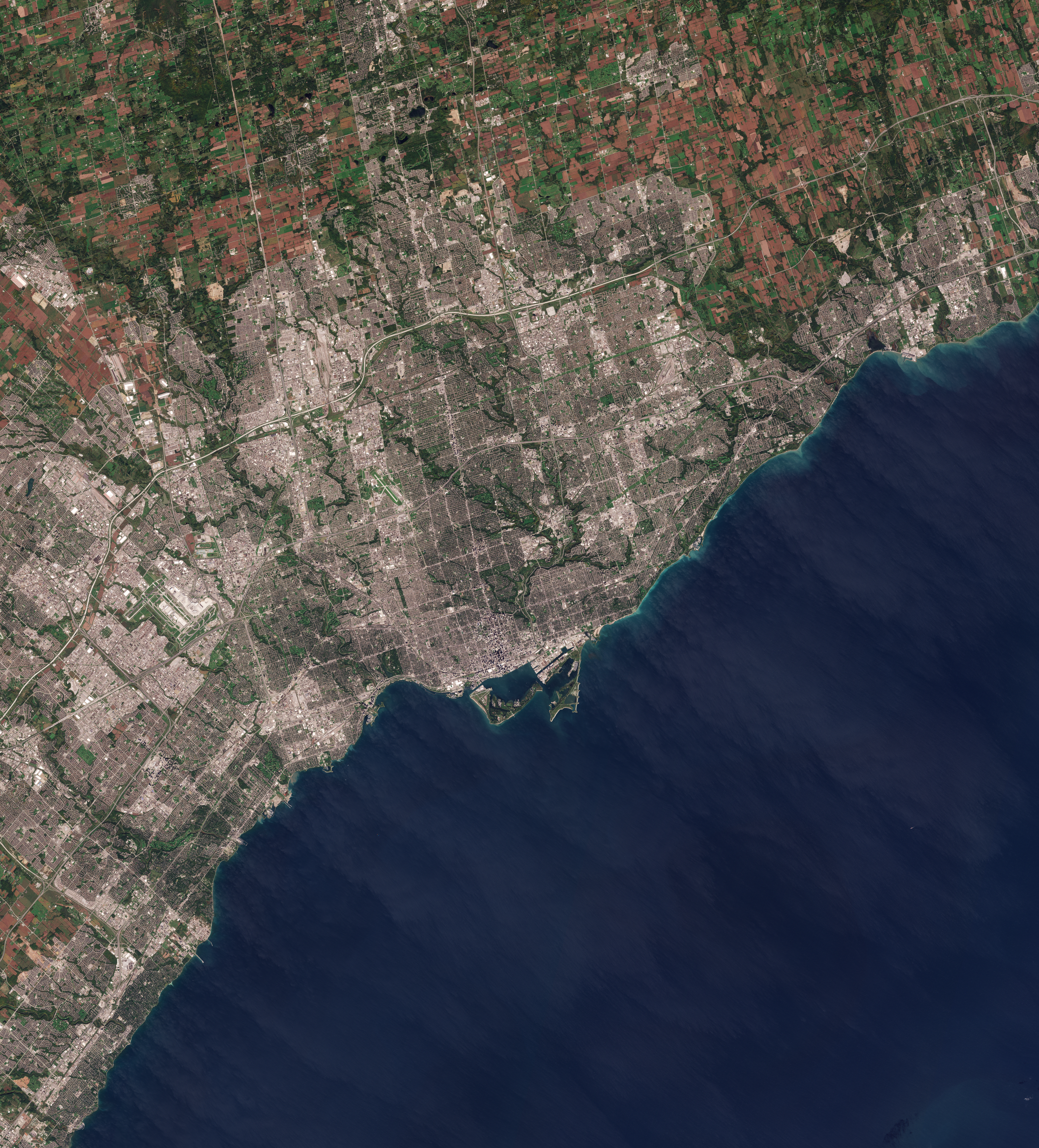
Toronto and its surrounding municipalities. The Greater Toronto Area is the largest metropolitan area in the Corridor.

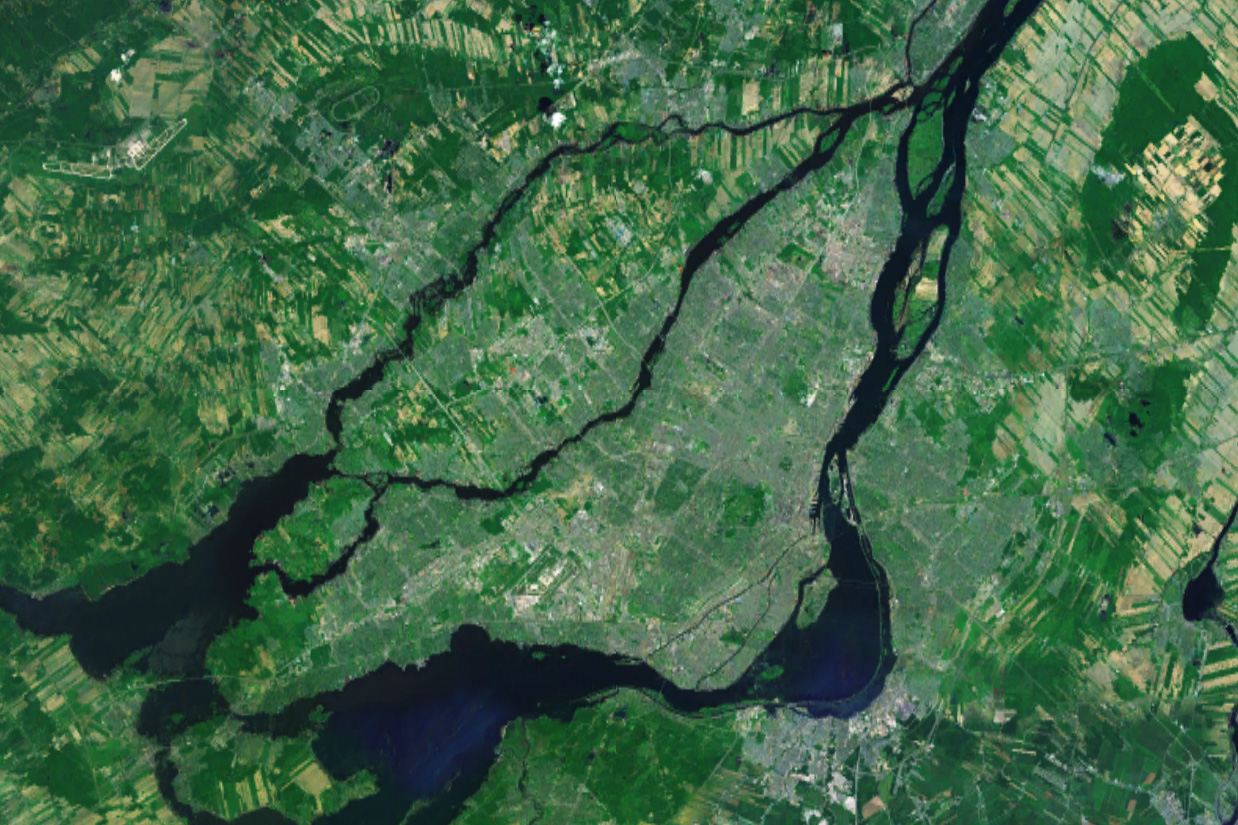
Montreal and its surrounding municipalities. Greater Montreal is the second largest metropolitan area in the Corridor.

According to the 2006 Canadian Census, more than 94% of Ontario's population lives in its portion of the corridor. Similarly, more than 65% of Quebec's population lives in or close to Montreal and Quebec City. About half of Canada's total population live between Quebec City and Windsor.

The three major census metropolitan areas (CMAs) in the Corridor are (populations as of 2021):

- Greater Toronto Area (6,712,341)
- Greater Montreal (4,291,732)
- National Capital Region (1,488,307)

The remaining census metropolitan areas along the corridor are:

- Quebec City (839,311)
- Hamilton (785,184)
- Kitchener–Waterloo–Cambridge (575,847)
- London (543,551)
- St. Catharines – Niagara (433,604)
- Windsor (422,630)
- Oshawa (415,311)
- Sherbrooke (227,398)
- Barrie (212,856)
- Kingston (172,546)
- Guelph (165,588)
- Trois-Rivières (161,489)
- Peterborough (147,681)
- Brantford (144,162)
- Belleville (111,184)
- Drummondville (101,610)

Other significant urban areas along the corridor include Chatham-Kent, Sarnia, Granby, Kawartha Lakes, and Cornwall. As the population sprawls eastward, the future additions may include Montmagny, Saint-Jean-Port-Joli, Saint-Roch-des-Aulnaies, La Pocatière, Trois-Pistoles and eventually ending in Rimouski.

== History ==
=== French rule ===
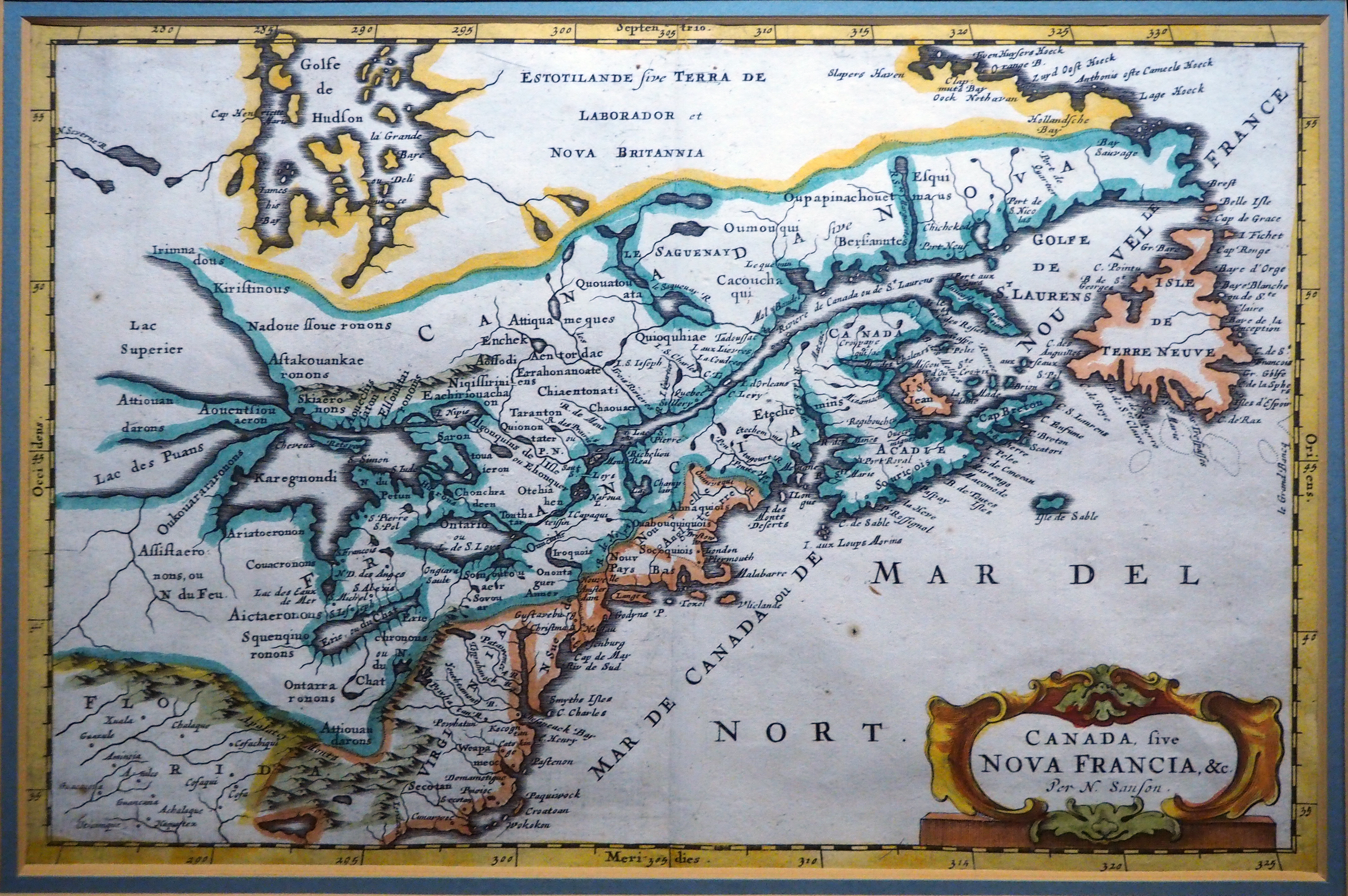
A map of New France, c. 1650. The eastern portion of the Corridor formed the centre of the colony of Canada, whereas its western portions formed a part of the Pays d'en Haut region of New France.

During the French colonization, this area of New France was named Canada and was a single administrative unit under the governor-general (with regional deputy governors in some cities). However, only the eastern third of the corridor, from Quebec City to Montreal, was heavily settled. The major cross-country route used by voyageurs in the fur trade continued west from Montreal through the Canadian Shield along the Ottawa Valley to Lake Nipissing and Georgian Bay, passing far to the north of what would later become the Ontario part of the corridor. The lack of good farmland made that route unsuitable for settlement, however, and the frequent portages made transportation in boats larger than canoes difficult.

During the North American part of the Seven Years' War between Great Britain and France, the settlements along the corridor were at the centre of the conflicts. New France, including the areas that make up the Corridor, were ceded to Great Britain at the end of the conflict; formalized with the signing of the Treaty of Paris.

=== British rule ===
When the English-speaking United Empire Loyalists arrived in the Province of Quebec as a result of the American Revolution, they settled along the narrow strip north of the St. Lawrence River and lower Great Lakes, where good farm land was available and larger boats could be used for transportation. These people formed the English-speaking nucleus of what later became Ontario. By contrast, many of the Ontario towns along the old fur-trading and logging route to the north, through the Ottawa Valley and westward, still have significant French-speaking populations. Initially, Kingston was the principal city of the English half of the corridor, but eventually Toronto outgrew it. As a result of the influx of migrants, the Province of Quebec was split into two new colonies, Lower and Upper Canada; with administration over the Corridor split between the two Canadas.

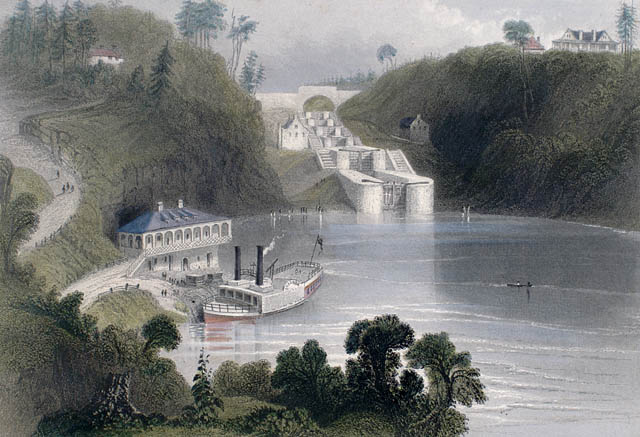
The Rideau Canal in Bytown (present day Ottawa) in 1841. The canal was built in the 19th-century as a secure transit route for the Corridor in case war broke out with the US.

During the War of 1812, the settlements along the corridor were at the centre of the conflicts. The Rideau Canal was constructed to provide a way to bypass the most vulnerable part of the corridor, from Cornwall to Kingston, situated close to the Canada-U.S. border. After the Rebellions of 1837–1838, the two Canadas were united to form the Province of Canada. Ottawa was eventually chosen as Canada's capital by Queen Victoria precisely because it was further inland and thus less vulnerable to attack, though it is now also considered part of the corridor.

=== Confederated Canada ===
The construction of the Saint Lawrence Seaway during the late 1950s made it possible for some ocean-going vessels to travel the full length of the corridor and beyond to the upper Great Lakes, but resulted in the destruction of several villages in the Eastern Ontario portion of the corridor.

== Transportation ==
The corridor is held together by a series of major transportation routes – water, road, rail, and air — all running close together and sometimes overlapping each other. These routes are anchored by Ontario Highway 401, the busiest highway in North America from Windsor leading into Quebec Autoroute 20 to Montreal and Quebec City.

=== Airports ===
The major passenger airports along the corridor are Toronto Pearson International Airport, Montréal-Pierre Elliott Trudeau International Airport, Ottawa Macdonald–Cartier International Airport, Québec/Jean Lesage International Airport, Hamilton/John C. Munro International Airport, and the military airbase at CFB Trenton.

Other civilian corridor airports with scheduled airline service include Windsor Airport, Sarnia (Chris Hadfield) Airport, London International Airport, Region of Waterloo International Airport, Billy Bishop Toronto City Airport, Kingston/Norman Rogers Airport, Lake Simcoe Regional Airport and Gatineau-Ottawa Executive Airport. Montréal-Mirabel International Airport is a large facility near Montreal that is mainly used for cargo flights but is also home to medical evacuation and general aviation flights.

Inside the corridor, the busiest area of travel is the Toronto–Ottawa–Montreal triangle. There are roughly 108 flights within the Toronto–Ottawa–Montreal triangle every work day, making it the busiest air route in Canada and 15th busiest air route in the world. Air Canada serves the three cities with its Rapidair service, offering hourly flights, and its principal competitor WestJet offers similar service. Air Canada and Porter Airlines fly from Billy Bishop Toronto City Airport to Ottawa and Montreal, while Air Canada Jazz offers commuter flights connecting many of the smaller airports to Toronto, Ottawa, and Montreal. In addition to scheduled air service, some of the airports along the corridor also have frequent charter flights like Air Transat and Sunwing to popular tourist destinations.

=== Rail ===
Map for the VIA Rail Corridor train routes

Both the Canadian National Railway (CN) and the Canadian Pacific Kansas City (CPKC) have extensive freight railway lines along the length of the Quebec City – Windsor Corridor. Intercity passenger railway service is provided by Via Rail throughout the region, mostly using CN freight lines. Referred to in Via Rail's published timetables as simply the Corridor, the Quebec City – Windsor Corridor is the busiest portion of the Via system, accounting for the majority of Canada's intercity passenger trains and ridership. About 67% of Via Rail's total revenue is earned on the Quebec City – Windsor Corridor. Prior to Via's formation in 1978, both CN and CP operated Corridor services.

Other inter-city trains from outside the region originate and terminate at cities in the Corridor, such as Via's Canadian and Ocean. Amtrak offers two international inter-city passenger railway lines that starts in New York City with one that ends in Toronto and the other in Montreal, serving cities along the Corridor as well as in Upstate New York.

==== Future high-speed rail (Alto) ====
On February 19, 2025, then-Prime Minister Justin Trudeau announced that the Cadence project was being changed to a fully electric high-speed rail line from Toronto to Quebec City. The approximately 1,000 km corridor project will be named Alto, which is also the new name of Via Rail's Crown Corporation, formerly known as High Frequency Rail. The Cadence consortium along with the Crown corporation will collaborate to design, finance, operate, and maintain the project.

=== Roadways ===
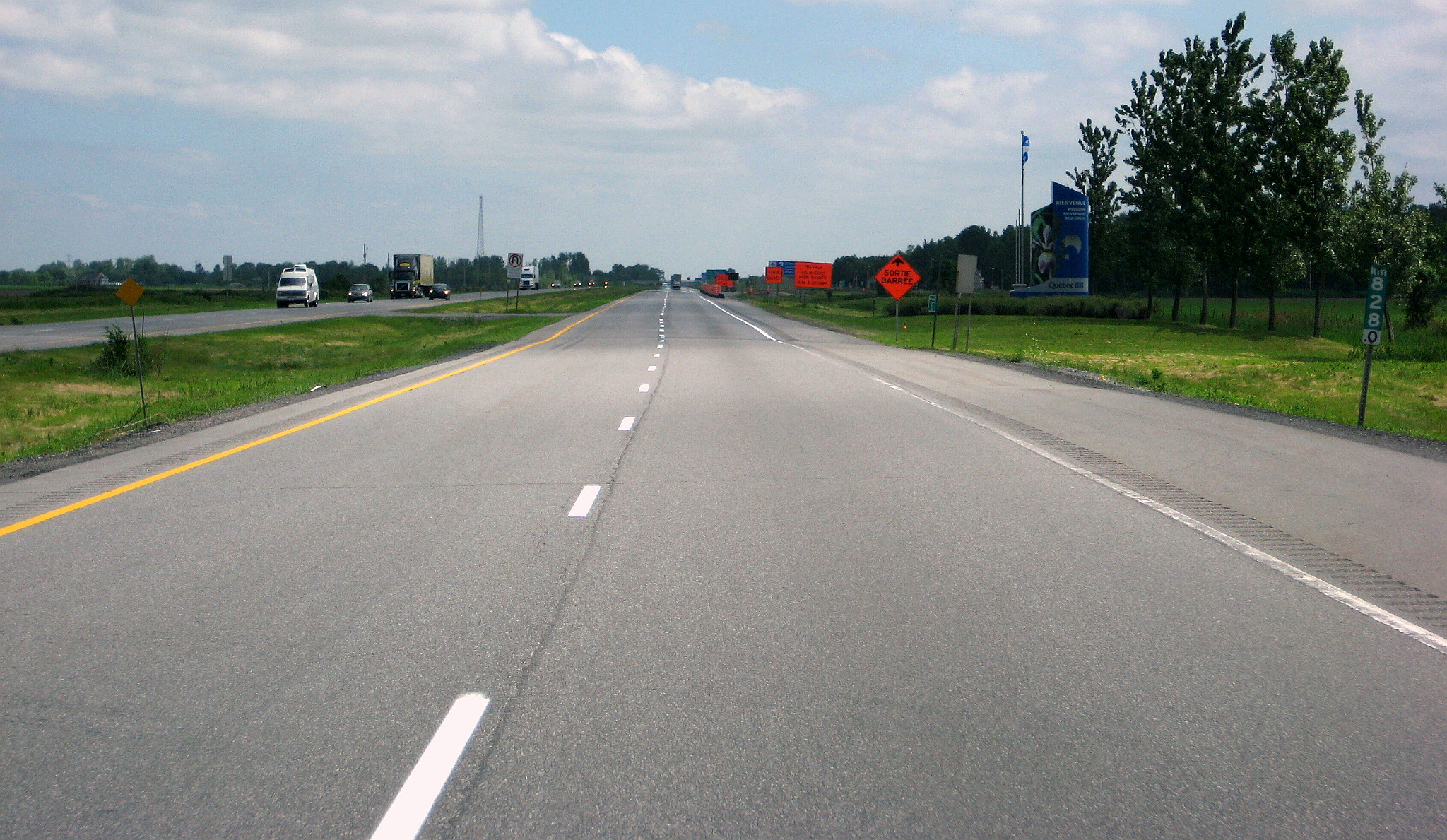
The eastern end of Ontario Highway 401 at the Ontario-Quebec border. The highway continues into Quebec as Autoroute 20.

Most of the cities of the Ontario portion of the corridor were originally joined by Highway 2 (often known locally by names such as "Montreal Road," "Toronto Road," or "Kingston Road") following the routes of older stagecoach roads and the paths and trails that predated them. Highway 2 still forms the main street of many of the corridor's Ontario towns and cities (which were built around it), but large parts of the highway are now maintained by counties or municipalities rather than the province. From 1938 to 1968 the province of Ontario built Highway 401, a freeway that, aside from running more northerly nearby Kitchener instead of through Hamilton, mostly follows a similar route to Highway 2 but bypasses most of the town and city centres. The 401 is now the main transportation route of the corridor up to the Quebec border, where it becomes Autoroute 20 and continues east through the Quebec part of the corridor to Quebec City. Highway 403, which connects to the 401 at both of its ends, largely follows the route of Highway 2 between Woodstock and Toronto including through Hamilton and acts as another important main transportation artery. Highways 416 and 417 link Ottawa to Brockville on the 401 and Montreal on Autoroute 20.

=== Waterways ===
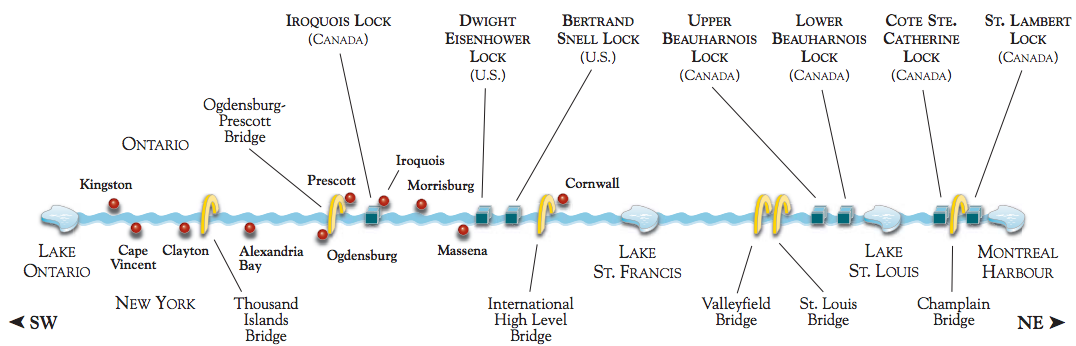
Diagram of the Montreal-Lake Ontario portion of the Saint Lawrence Seaway

The oldest transportation route is the St. Lawrence River and Great Lakes, where the series of channels and locks that make up the St. Lawrence Seaway allow ocean-going vessels and lake freighters to travel the entire length of the corridor.

== See also ==
- Demographics of Canada
- Great Lakes region
- Megalopolis (city type)
- Northeast United States
- Southern Ontario
- Golden Horseshoe
