= Sarnia station =

Railway station in Ontario, Canada

Sarnia
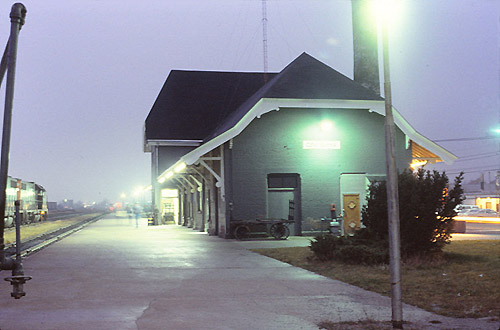
- The depot at the Sarnia railway station, 1982

General information
- Location: 125 Green Street; Sarnia, Ontario; Canada
- Coordinates: 42.9572°N 82.3889°W
- Elevation: 187 metres (614 ft)
- Owner: Via Rail
- Platforms: 1 side platform
- Tracks: 4

Construction
- Structure type: Unstaffed station; At-grade
- Parking: Yes
- Accessible: Yes

Other information
- Station code: Amtrak: SIA
- IATA code: XDX
- Website: Sarnia station

History
- Opened: 1891

Services
| Preceding station | Via Rail | Following station |
|---|---|---|
| Terminus | Sarnia–Toronto | Wyoming toward Toronto |
Former services
| Preceding station | Amtrak | Following station |
|---|---|---|
| Port Huron toward Chicago | International | Strathroy toward Toronto |
| Preceding station | Canadian National Railway | Following station |
| through to GTW | Grand Trunk Railway; Main Line | Mandaumin toward Montreal |
| Terminus | Sarnia – Toronto via Lucan Crossing | Blackwell toward Toronto |
| Preceding station | Grand Trunk Western Railroad | Following station |
| Port Huron toward Chicago | Main Line | through to CN |

Heritage Railway Station (Canada)
- Designated: 1994
- Reference no.: 4628
Location
- Location within Southern Ontario Location within Ontario Location within Canada

Sarnia station (also Sarnia Tunnel Station) is a Via Rail train station in Sarnia, Ontario, Canada. It is the western terminus for Via Rail trains running from Toronto through southwestern Ontario. The unstaffed station is wheelchair accessible. The station includes vending machines, washrooms, a pay phone, and a medium-sized waiting area.

The Gothic Revival station was built in 1891 by the Grand Trunk Railway (to a design by engineer Joseph Hobson) and later acquired by Via Rail through CN Rail.

== Service ==
As of January 2026, the station is served by one round trip daily to Toronto Union Station via London and Kitchener, Ontario. Train 84 leaves departs from Sarnia at 8:40 am, and returns as train 87 at 10:24 pm. End-to-end travel time is approximately five hours.

The International Limited which was operated jointly by Via Rail and Amtrak, running between Chicago and Toronto, stopped in Sarnia. The service, which had ended in 1971 by CN Rail, was restarted in 1982 and discontinued again in 2004 due to border delays and post-9/11.

Sarnia Transit bus route 1 Confederation will service the railway station on request and the connection to Amtrak Blue Water route can be made from cross border taxis between Sarnia and Port Huron.

== See also ==
- List of designated heritage railway stations of Canada
- Rail transport in Ontario
