= Windsor station (Ontario) =

Railway station in Ontario, Canada

Windsor
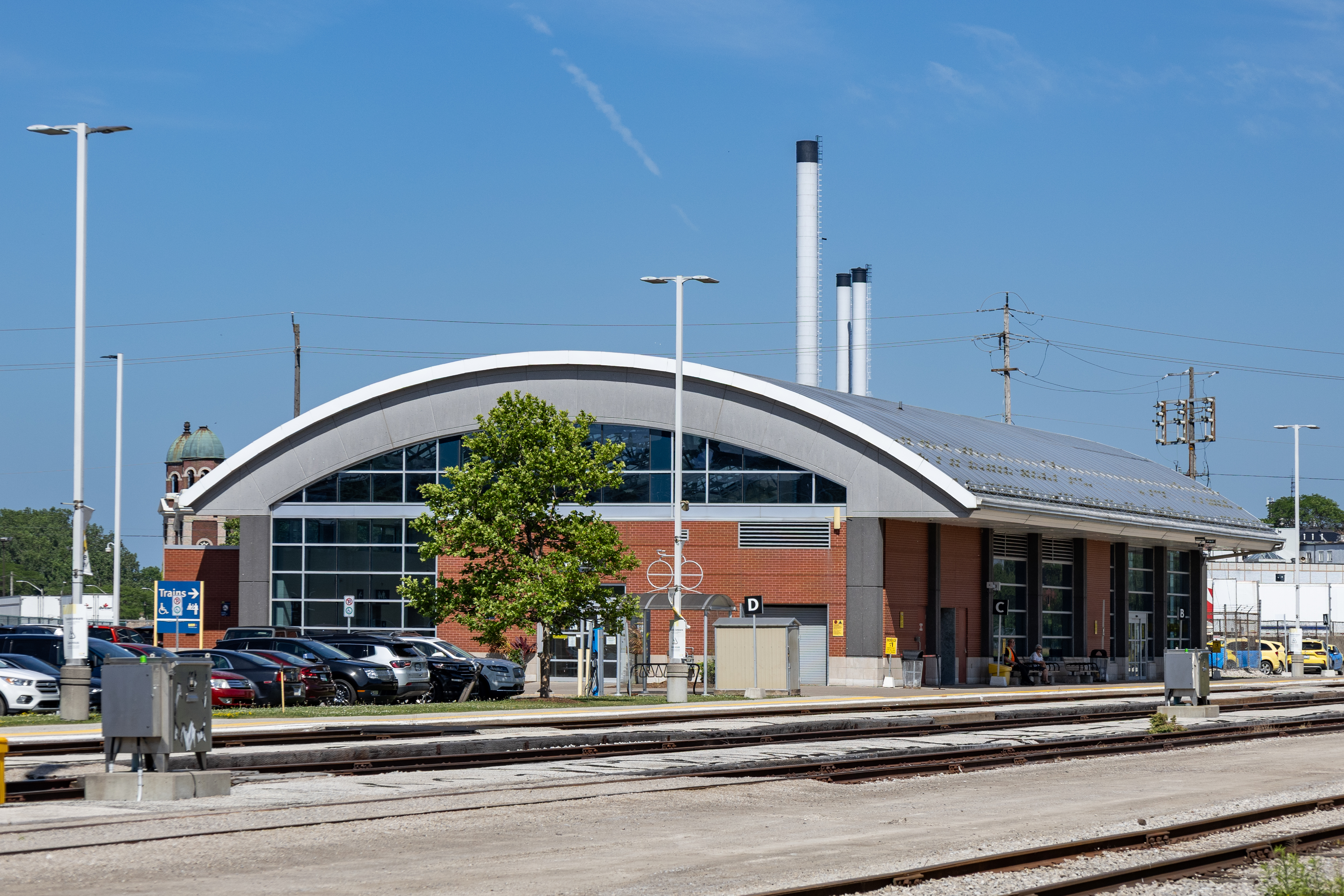
- Exterior of Windsor station in 2025

General information
- Location: 298 Walker Road; Windsor, Ontario; Canada
- Coordinates: 42.3254°N 83.0092°W
- Owner: Via Rail
- Platforms: 1 side platform, 2 island platforms
- Tracks: 3

Construction
- Structure type: Staffed station
- Platform levels: 1
- Parking: Yes
- Accessible: Yes

Other information
- Station code: Via Rail: WDON
- IATA code: XEC
- Website: Windsor train station

History
- Opened: 1961
- Rebuilt: 2012

Services
Preceding station	Via Rail	Following station
Terminus	Windsor–Toronto	Chatham toward Toronto
Proposed services
Preceding station	Amtrak	Following station
Detroit (Michigan Central) toward Chicago	Wolverine	Terminus
Location
- Location within Southern Ontario Location within Ontario Location within Canada

Windsor station is a train station in Windsor, Ontario, Canada. It is the western terminus of Via Rail's Quebec City–Windsor Corridor. It is located in the Walkerville neighbourhood adjacent to the Hiram Walker distillery, near the Detroit River. During the week, it is served by eight Via Rail train trips per day, of which four originate in Windsor and four return to Windsor from Toronto (three each way on Sundays). In 2012, Windsor was listed as the seventh busiest station in the country, according to Via.

== History ==
The original station was built by the Grand Trunk Railway in 1884 on the waterfront north of Sandwich Street East (Riverside Drive East) at the foot of Goyeau Street. The station was closed in 1961 when service was relocated to the station's present location in Walkerville. The site of the first station is now the location of Riverfront Park and near where Spirit of Windsor Canadian National # 5588 now sits.

The New York Central Railroad's train to Toronto and Montreal and Wolverine, as well as Amtrak's Niagara Rainbow train crossed the Detroit River by way of the Michigan Central Railway Tunnel but did not use this station. Instead, they used the Windsor Michigan Central Railroad Depot on the line leased from Canada Southern Railway until 1979 when service ceased. That station, which had been built in 1911, was destroyed by fire in 1996.

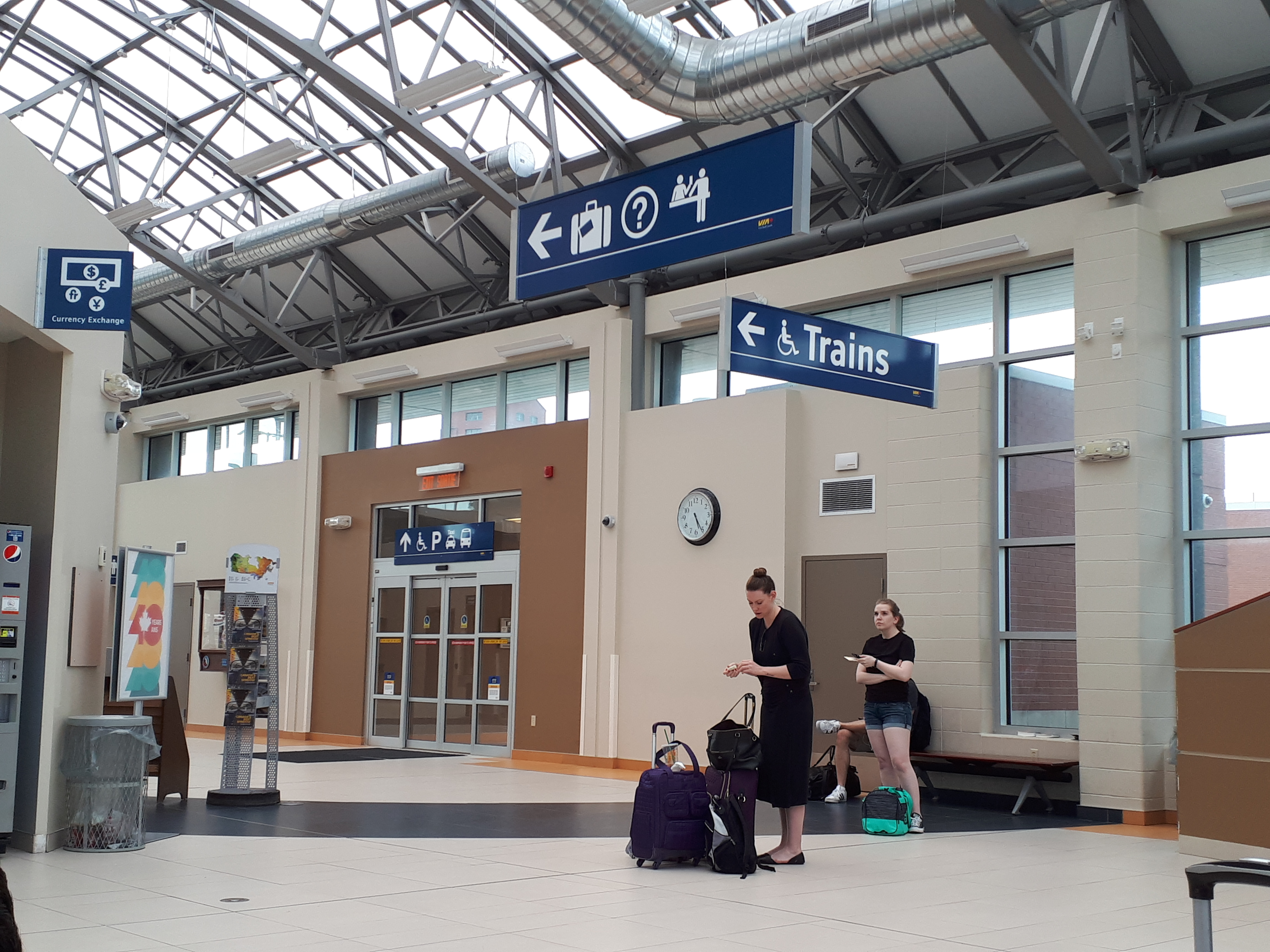
Interior of Windsor station in 2018

On November 8, 2010, Via Rail unveiled the design for a new station building to replace the previous structure built in the 1960s. The new building was completed in September 2012 at a cost of C$5.3 million. The station was officially opened on November 16, 2012, with Stephen Fletcher from the Government of Canada and Yves Desjardins-Sciliano from VIA Rail present.

The Amtrak Wolverine is planned to be extended here with service beginning in late 2028 pending customs approvals and track upgrades.
