= Quebec City–Windsor Corridor (Via Rail) =

Passenger train service in Quebec and Ontario, Canada

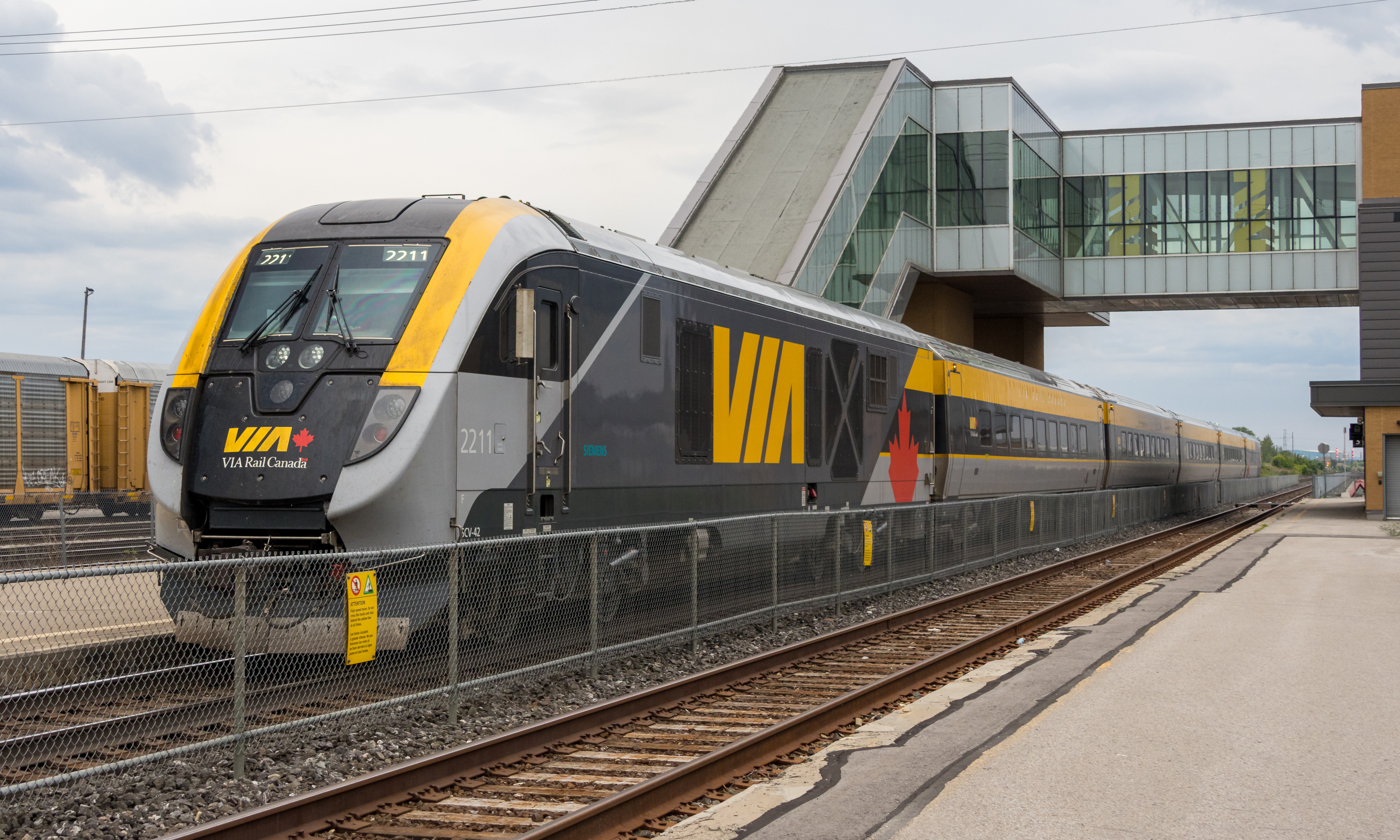
- A Via Rail train at Oshawa

Overview
- Owner: Canadian National Railway, Canadian Pacific Kansas City, Metrolinx, Via Rail
- Locale: Quebec City–Windsor Corridor
- Termini: Windsor, Sarnia, Niagara Falls, Ontario; Quebec City
- Stations: Toronto, Ottawa, Montreal, Kingston, Guelph, Kitchener, London
- Website: viarail.ca/corridor

Service
- Type: Inter-city rail
- System: Via Rail
- Operator: Via Rail
- Rolling stock: P42DC and LRC; Siemens Charger and Siemens Venture
- Ridership: 4,191,080 (2024)

History
- Opened: 1856; 170 years ago

Technical
- Number of tracks: 2+
- Track gauge: 1,435 mm (4 ft 8 1/2 in) standard gauge
- Operating speed: 160 km/h (100 mph)
Route map

The Quebec City–Windsor Corridor (French: Ligne de Québec à Windsor), also known as Ontario–Québec or The Corridor, is a Via Rail passenger rail service operating in the Canadian provinces of Quebec and Ontario. It is Via Rail's busiest service area, accounting for 81% of its revenue and 95% of its ridership.

== History ==
Prior to Via's formation in 1978, Canadian National Railway operated its passenger trains, branded Rapido, on the same tracks and Canadian Pacific Railway (now Canadian Pacific Kansas City) also offered limited service.

=== High-speed proposal ===
During the 1970s and early 1980s, CN and later Via Rail operated the Turbo Train on existing freight rail trackage. This equipment was later replaced by the Bombardier LRC (Light, Rapid, Comfortable) train sets. Beginning in the 1980s and through the 1990s, Via Rail, Bombardier and the provincial and federal governments studied the feasibility of establishing a dedicated high-speed passenger rail network linking Quebec City–Montreal–Ottawa–Toronto–Windsor similar to the French TGV as a means of reducing domestic air and highway travel between these destinations.

After a hiatus of ten years, a feasibility study on launching a high-speed rail service in the Corridor will be updated at the joint cost of the federal government, Ontario and Quebec. On November 14, 2011, the three governments officially released the final report of a high-speed rail study for this corridor.

=== 2009–2010 improvements ===
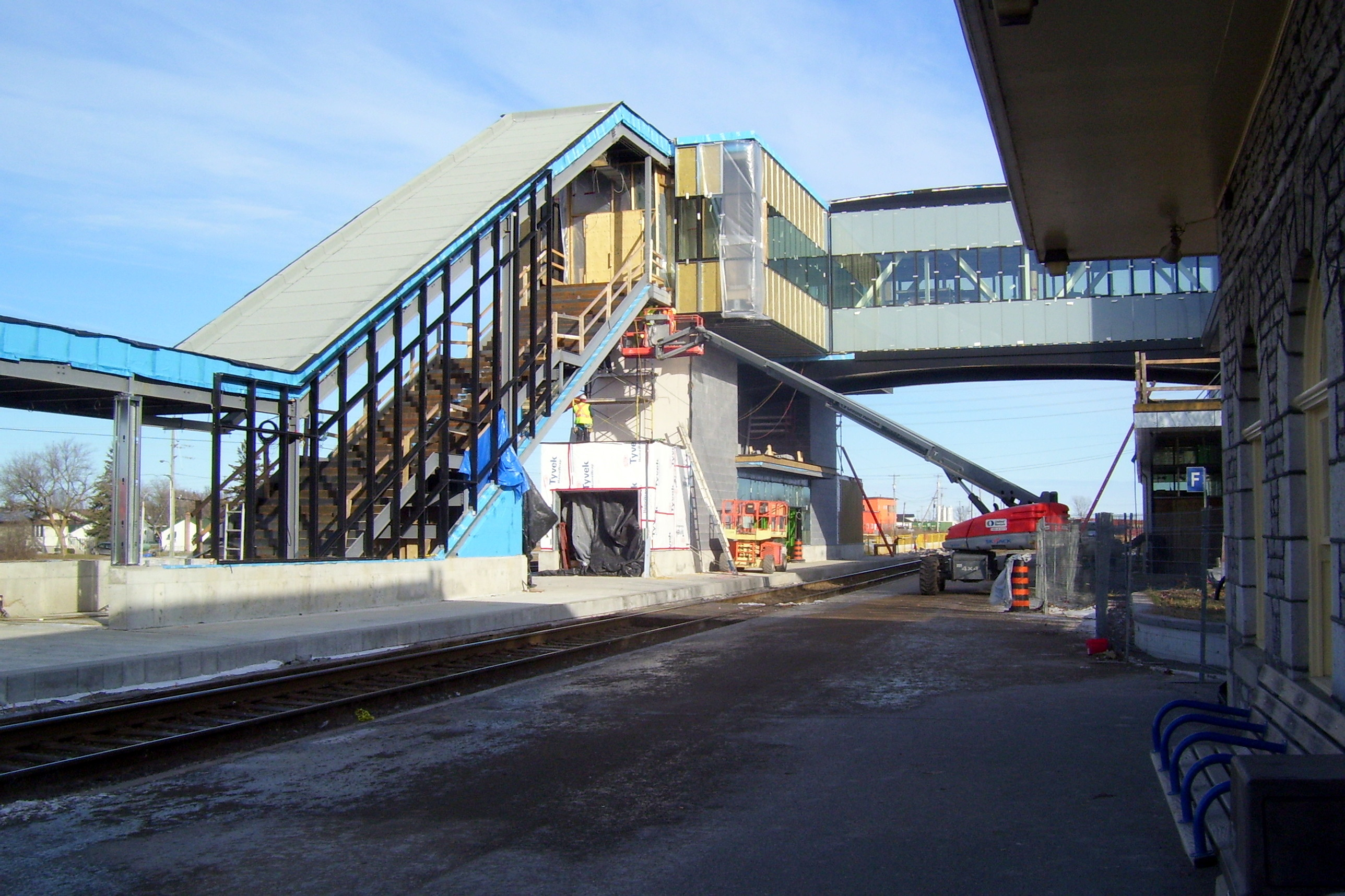
Construction of a new station building at Belleville in 2011

In 2009–2010, Via used CA$300 million of government stimulus money to upgrade segments of the Corridor. Notable track improvements were 70 km (43 mi) of additional third main track in four segments, and a short segment of fourth main track, as well as additional yard tracks at three locations. Improvements were made to several stations along the line, with new station buildings constructed at Belleville and Cobourg, and additional platforms for existing stations at Brockville and Oshawa. The improvements were planned to reduce delays along the route and to allow for a reduction in travel time of up to 30 minutes from end to end. They were intended to allow Via to introduce two new round-trip trains from Toronto to both Montreal and Ottawa without requiring the acquisition of new equipment.

== Service ==
=== Inter-city rail ===
Inter-city service along the Corridor is provided by several different routes connecting the different cities served by the service. There is no single route that travels the entire length of the Corridor from Windsor to Quebec City. Via runs a mix of local-service and express trains in the Corridor. The Corridor service area has the heaviest passenger train frequency in Canada, with 36 Via trains traversing the route daily. About 81% of Via's revenue comes from Corridor routes.

Via trains that start and end within the geographic region of the Quebec City–Windsor corridor are branded as a part of the Corridor service. Other inter-city trains from outside the Corridor may have their terminus at stations in the Corridor, such as the Canadian and the Ocean, but are marketed by their respective train names and are not considered to be Corridor services.

The Maple Leaf, a through service from Toronto to New York City, operated jointly with Amtrak, is crewed by Via as trains 97 and 98 on Via schedules, between Toronto and Niagara Falls, and can be considered part of Corridor services as well. It is the only scheduled rail service from the Corridor line from Burlington to Niagara Falls.

=== Routes ===
Corridor services comprise six routes. All routes except for Ottawa–Quebec City terminate at Toronto Union Station.

Route	Frequency	Ridership (2024)
Ottawa – Montreal – Quebec City	4 × daily	1,022,033
Toronto – Kingston – Ottawa	9 × daily	2,314,024
Toronto – Kingston – Montreal	6 × daily	2,314,024
Windsor – London – Toronto	5 × daily	805,516
Sarnia – London – Toronto	1 × daily	805,516
Toronto – Niagara Falls – New York (Maple Leaf)	1 × daily	49,507 (Note: Ridership for the Toronto–Niagara Falls portion of the route only.)

=== Commuter rail ===
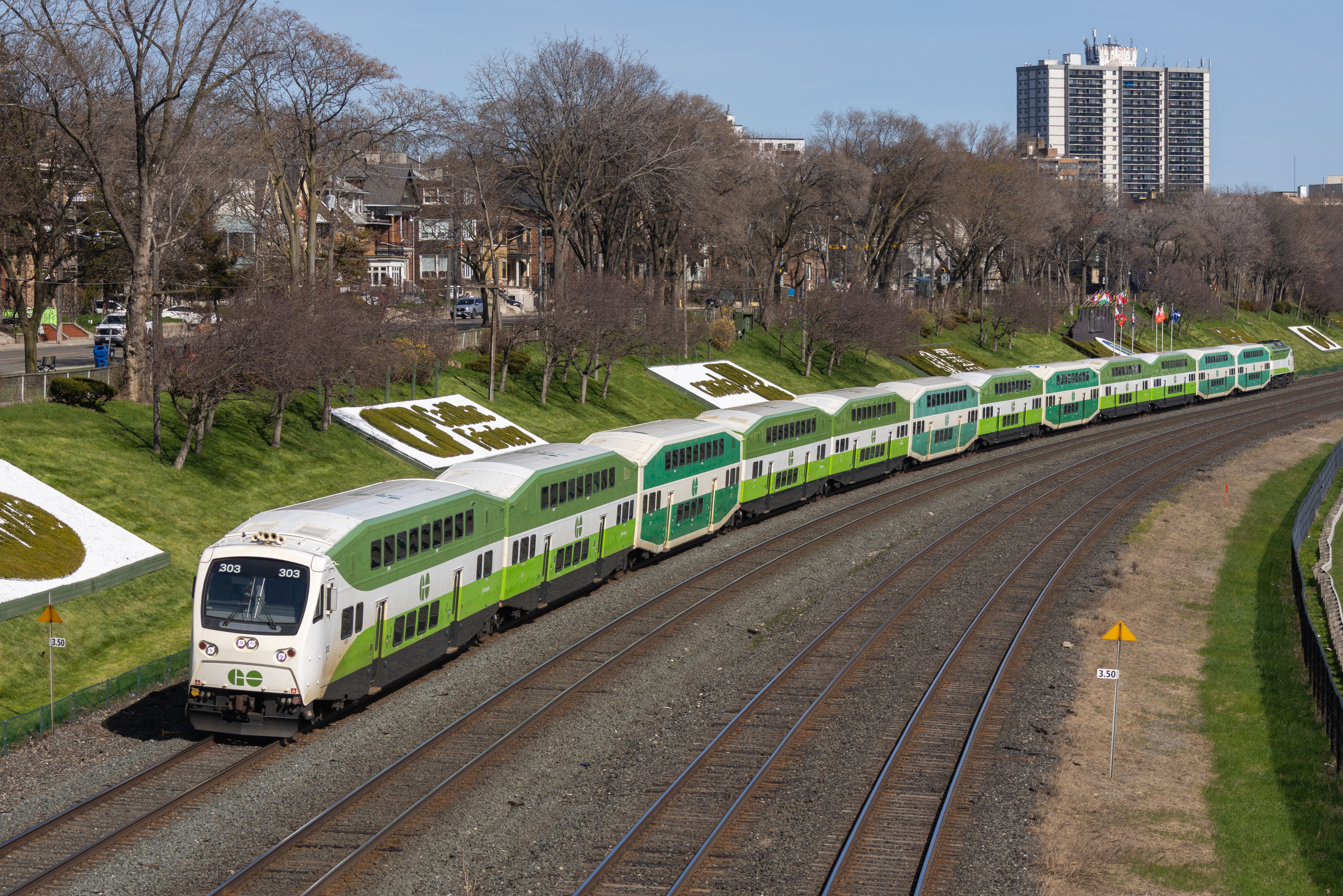
A GO Transit train on the main line in Toronto's west end

Two commuter rail agencies, GO Transit and Exo, share tracks with Via's Corridor trains. Both agencies are provincially funded and independent of Via.

- The GO Transit Kitchener line shares tracks with Via trains for its entire route from Toronto Union Station to Stratford Station.
- The GO Transit Lakeshore West line shares tracks with Via trains from Toronto Union Station to Bayview junction, just west of Aldershot GO Station. The Lakeshore West line Niagara Branch shares tracks with Via trains for its entire route from Toronto Union Station to Niagara Falls.
- The GO Transit Lakeshore East line shares tracks with Via trains from Toronto Union Station to Durham Junction, just west of Pickering GO Station. Between Pickering and Oshawa, GO trains use a separate parallel line immediately north of the CN/Via tracks.
- The Exo Mont-Saint-Hilaire line shares tracks with Via trains for its entire route from Montreal Central Station to Mont-Saint-Hilaire.
- The Exo Vaudreuil–Hudson line operates in the same corridor as Via trains from Dorion to Lachine, but does not share tracks with Via trains. Exo trains operate on CPKC tracks, while Via trains operate on parallel CN tracks.

== Trackage ==
Most of the trackage that Via trains use along the Corridor is owned by the Canadian National Railway. Via owns three former freight lines long the Corridor, one from Smiths Falls to Coteau-du-Lac, Quebec, via Ottawa; one from Smiths Falls to Brockville; and one from Chatham to Windsor, Ontario. Via Corridor trains run on three segments of tracks owned by Metrolinx; one from Burlington to Pickering, Ontario; one from Toronto Union Station to Malton, Mississauga; and one from Georgetown to Kitchener, Ontario. The proposed High Frequency Rail plan calls for adding Corridor services between Toronto and Quebec City that run on newly constructed dedicated tracks.

== Via HFR and Alto ==
On July 6, 2021, Transportation Minister Omar Alghabra announced that the federal government would launch the procurement process to build a "high-frequency rail [HFR] corridor" called Via HFR between Toronto and Quebec City by 2030. The cost of the project was expected to be between $6 billion and $12 billion. The plan is to have trains travel up to 200 km/h (125 mph) on a line that would run from Toronto to Quebec City through Peterborough, Ottawa, Montreal, Laval, and Trois-Rivières. As opposed to current operations along the Corridor, the trains would run on dedicated passenger tracks, improving service reliability since the trains would not have to compete with freight trains. Service reliability could increase to 95 percent, up significantly from its 2021 rate of 67 percent. Travel times are projected to decrease by 90 minutes on some routes, such as between Ottawa and Toronto. Ninety percent of the route is planned to be electrified. The timing of the announcement was criticized as political, since there was speculation of a federal election being held later in the year, which was later confirmed on August 15.

On October 28, 2024, it was confirmed that High Frequency Rail would be built as "full high-speed rail", with fully grade-separated trains capable of travelling up to 300 km/h (186 mph). The design of the system, later renamed as Alto, was expected to take approximately four years.

== See also ==
- Northeast Corridor
- Ontario § Railways
