= North Toronto station =

Former railway station in Toronto

North Toronto
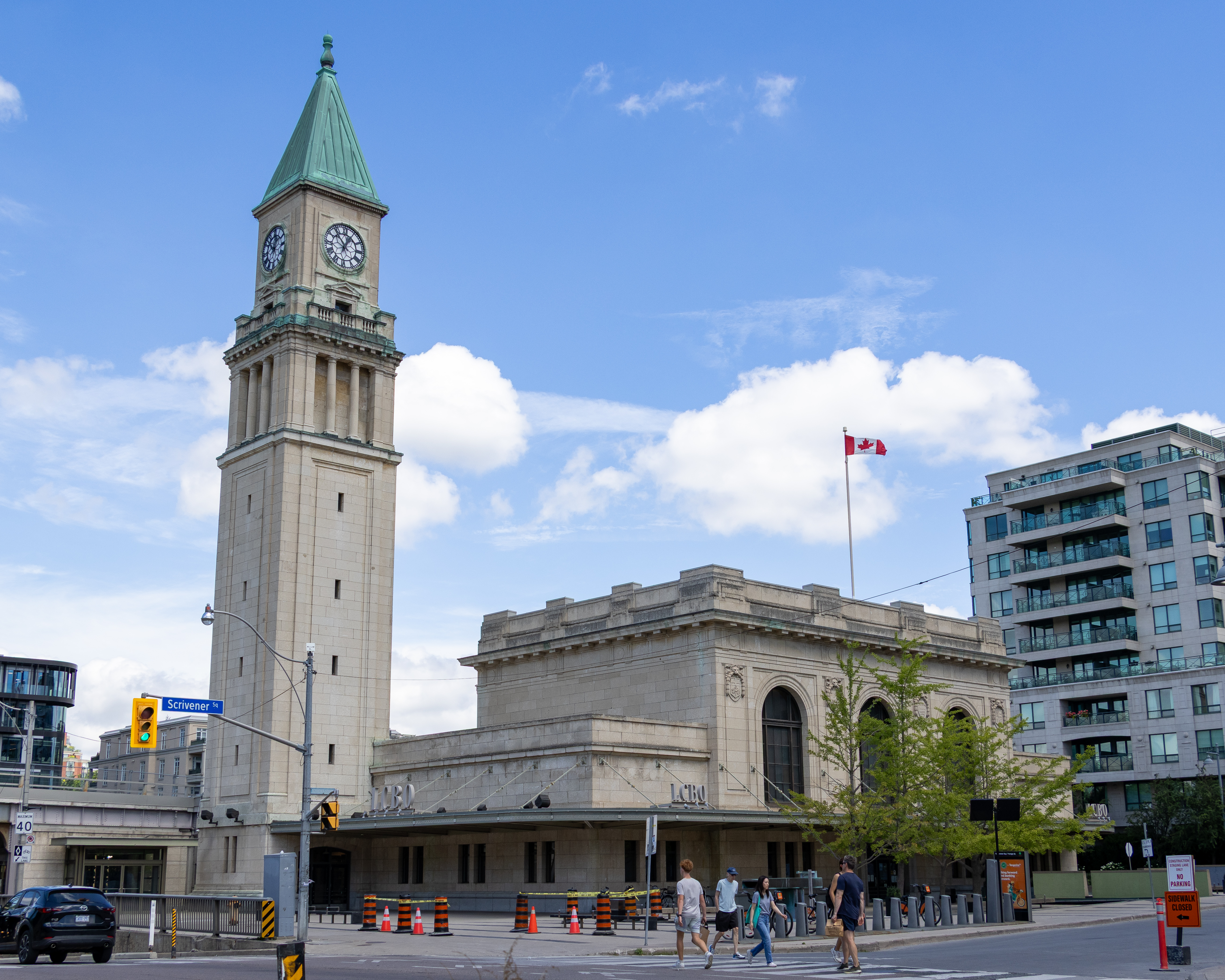
- North Toronto station in 2025

General information
- Location: 10 Scrivener Square; Toronto, Ontario; Canada
- Coordinates: 43°40′51″N 79°23′26″W
- Owner: Crestpoint Real Estate Investments Ltd.
- Platforms: None
- Tracks: 2

Construction
- Architect: Darling and Pearson
- Architectural style: Beaux Arts

History
- Opened: 1916
- Closed: September 27, 1930

Former services
Preceding station	Canadian Pacific Railway	Following station
West Toronto toward Detroit	Detroit – Montreal limited service	Leaside toward Montreal Windsor

Ontario Heritage Act
- Official name: C.P.R. North Toronto Station
- Designated: 1976
Location

The North Toronto railway station is a former Canadian Pacific Railway (CPR) station in the northwest corner of the Rosedale neighbourhood of Toronto, Ontario, Canada. It is located on the east side of Yonge Street, adjacent to the neighbourhood of Summerhill, and a short distance south of the Summerhill subway station. The building is now home to a Liquor Control Board of Ontario (LCBO) liquor store.

== Structure ==
The station, constructed in the Beaux Arts style, consists of a 43-metre (141 ft) clock tower and a three-storey main terminal. The tower is modelled after the Campanile di San Marco at Saint Mark's Square in Venice. The main terminal gallery has an 11.6-metre (38 ft) high ceiling supported by marble-clad walls and with elegant bronze suspended light fixtures.

The foot print of the station is 75 feet 9 inches by 114 feet 2 inches and that of the clock tower is 24 feet 9 inches, according to plans published in the August 1915 edition of Canadian Railway and Marine World. The four clock faces, each 2.4 metres (8 feet) in diameter, were always illuminated at night during the station's service life.

This station was the first building in the city to be constructed of Tyndall limestone from Manitoba, supplied by The Wallace Sandstone Quarries. The material is noted for its weather resistance, embedded fossils, and dappled beige hues.

== History ==
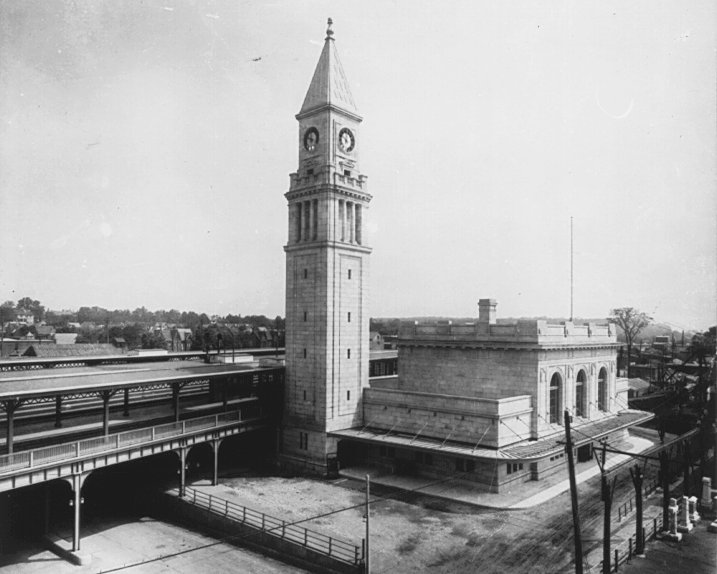
The station shortly after its opening in 1916

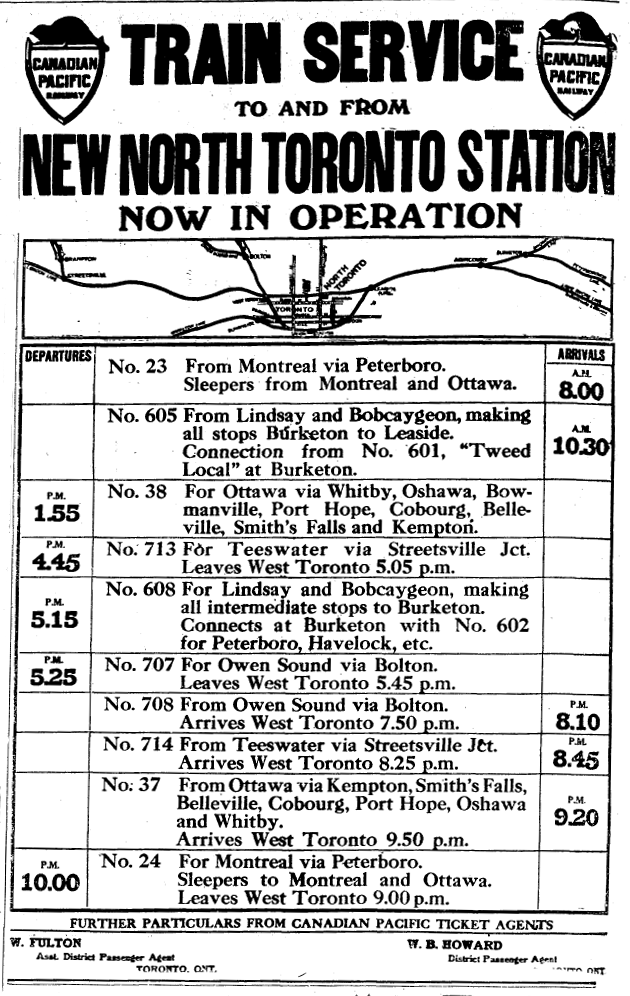
Schedule for the new station, June 15, 1916

The station was designed by Darling and Pearson and built in 1916 by P. Lyall & Sons Construction Company to service the Canadian Pacific Railway (CPR) line running across Toronto. The cornerstone was laid on September 9, 1915, by Mayor Tommy Church, and the station officially opened for passenger service on June 14, 1916 (though it had already been serving in the role since June 4). The station was built at a cost of CA$750,000.($18.4 million in 2025 dollars)

The current structure replaced a more modest railway station to the west of Yonge. The two structures existed together for a time (an existing photograph, circa 1920, showing the two buildings, is currently held in the City of Toronto Archive collection). Canada's first shipment of whale meat passed through the station, circa 1917.

When Union Station opened in 1927 and the Great Depression followed shortly thereafter, the North Toronto Station, which served smaller towns in Ontario and was originally meant to augment the bigger station, began to suffer. The last paying passengers filed through the station on September 27, 1930. Brewers' Retail moved into the northern portion of the terminal building in 1931.

The station was re-opened, briefly, at 10:30 a.m. on May 22, 1939, when King George VI and his consort, Queen Elizabeth (mother of Queen Elizabeth II), arrived for their first visit to Toronto. This was the "first visit to Canada by a reigning British monarch." The king was also officially the Canadian monarch, marking the first visit by one to the city. The royal couple departed Toronto through Union Station. Shortly after World War II, returning soldiers passed through the station; they were its last rail passengers.

On September 9, 1915, a time capsule was entombed in the 1.7 tonnes (3,700 lb) cornerstone laid by the then mayor of Toronto, Tommy Church. The capsule was found and opened 100 years later in September 2015. It contained around 50 items, including 10 blueprints, an old map of Toronto, six newspapers from September 9, 1915, coins, and a 1915 City of Toronto municipal handbook. The items were found in exceptional condition, with only yellowing pages on the newspapers and tarnish on the coins. A new capsule was buried in the space formerly occupied by the old one, and it included items from September 9, 2015 – issues of the Toronto Star, The Globe and Mail and National Post, a copy of the September issue of Toronto Life magazine, and the current edition of the LCBO Food & Drink guide were included. Also buried were a BlackBerry and an iPhone, a modern map of Toronto and a few bottles of spirits (in homage to the current use of the building as an LCBO outlet).

=== Restoration ===
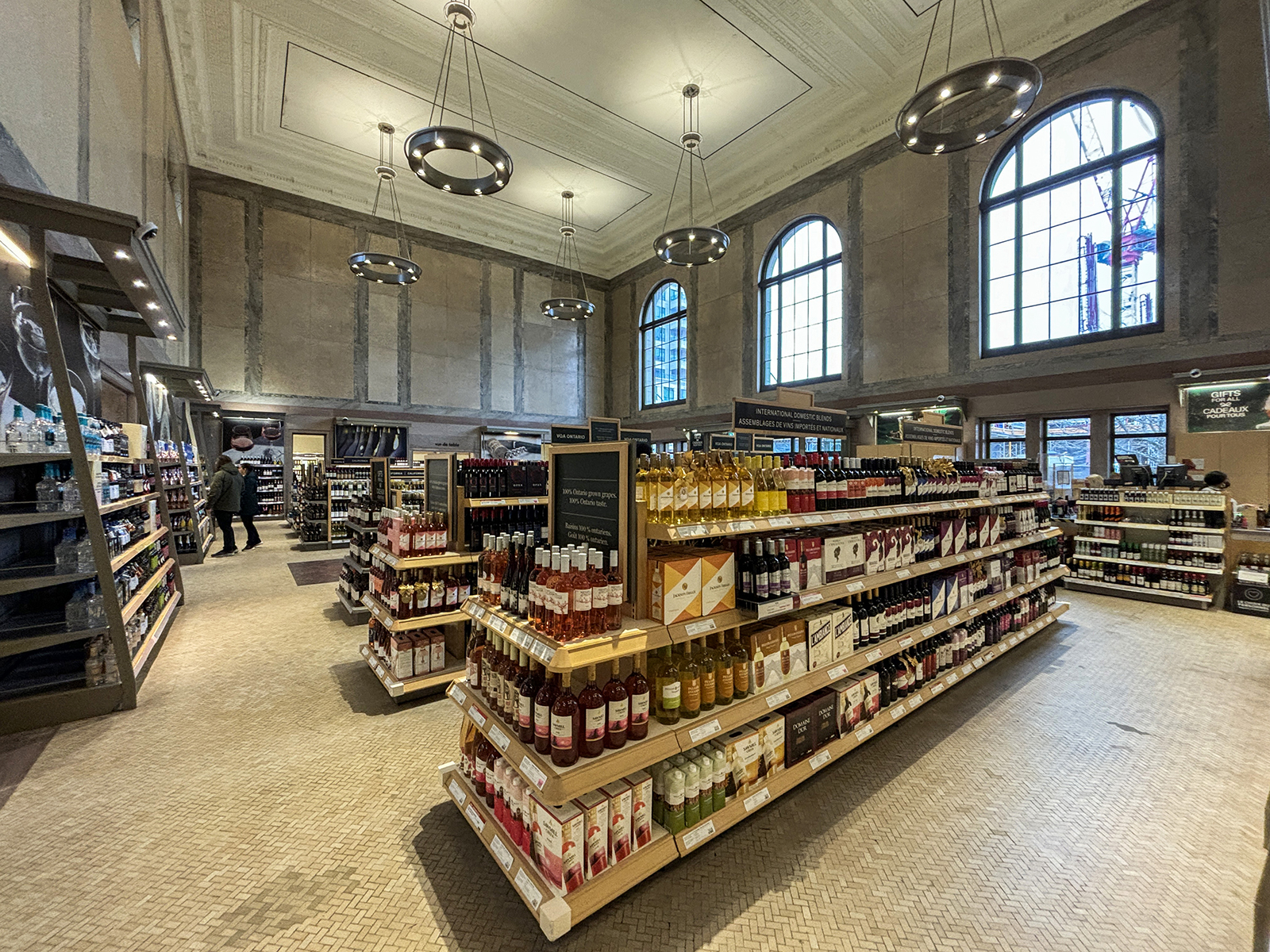
The interior of the station in 2023

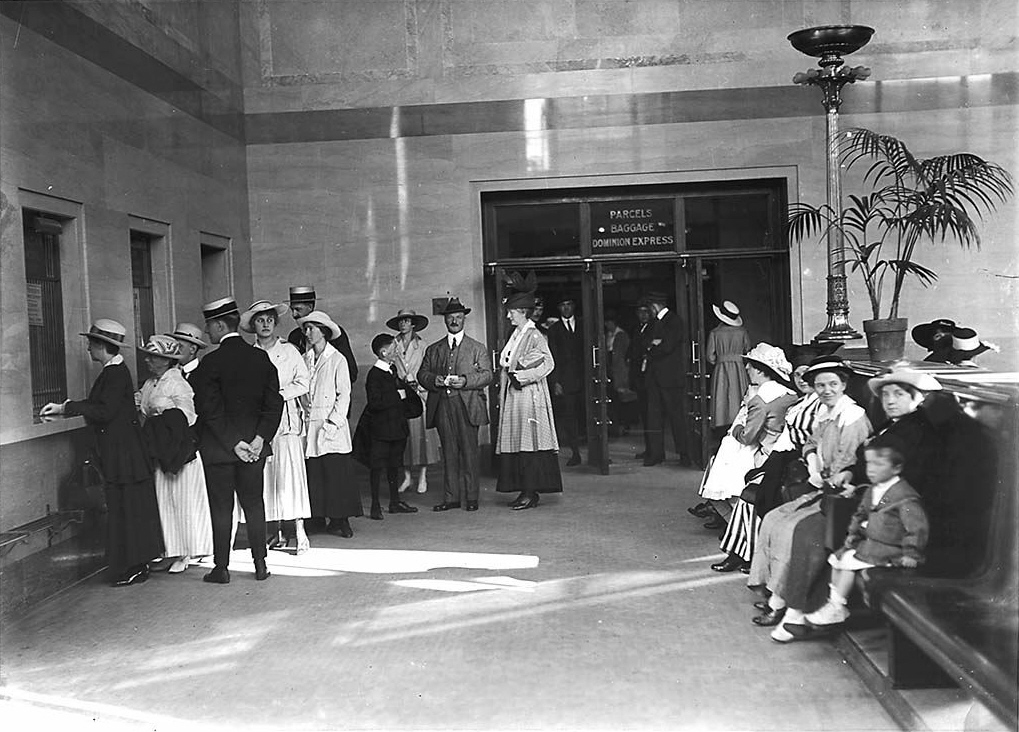
The interior of the station in 1916

Though the former beauty of the station's exterior could be surmised even in its most downtrodden days, much of the station's elegant interior was hidden behind boardings put up by Brewers' Retail and the Liquor Control Board of Ontario (LCBO, the government-owned alcohol retailer which had moved into the southern part of the terminal building in 1940) until the building was restored in 2004 by Woodcliffe Corporation. The architects were Goldsmith Borgal & Company Ltd., and Eastern Construction was contracted to do the work.

The clocks had been removed from the tower between 1948 and 1950, allowing pigeons to enter the structure through holes in the clock faces. The first order of business during the restoration of the tower was the removal of approximately 4,000 kilograms (8,800 lb) of desiccated pigeon droppings that had accumulated in its base. The original movements of the clocks themselves were almost completely recovered and restored; now, with the help of GPS signals, they display the time with much greater precision and reliability.

The building is protected under Part IV of the Ontario Heritage Act since October 13, 1976. The building was a former Heritage Railway Station but was removed from the list of protected stations as a railway no longer owned the property. A Heritage Easement has been placed on the property since December 5, 1997. The City of Toronto also lists the building as part of the "South Rosedale Heritage Conservation District".

Though it now serves as the Summerhill LCBO outlet, the largest liquor store in Canada, freight trains still run behind the station. During restoration, to break up train-induced vibrations that might otherwise rattle bottles and 'bruise' more expensive merchandise, the concrete floor was impregnated with rubber from discarded automobile tires.

A piazza, called Scrivener Square (named in honour of Margaret Scrivener), with a tipping water fountain, provides a wide public space on the southern aspect.

== Plans ==
In the mid-1980s, GO Transit first proposed reintroducing passenger service for commuters through North Toronto station in the form of a ‘Midtown’ line allowing commuter traffic to run between the existing Kipling and Agincourt stations without travelling through the city centre. A new transit plan announced by Ontario Premier Dalton McGuinty in 2007 included a proposal to institute a Midtown corridor, and this was repeated by Metrolinx in their regional transportation plan, The Big Move. In addition, it has been suggested that the station could be used for some Via Rail and Ontario Northland trains in order to relieve congestion at Union Station, or as a branch of a future city-airport rail link.

== Qualities ==
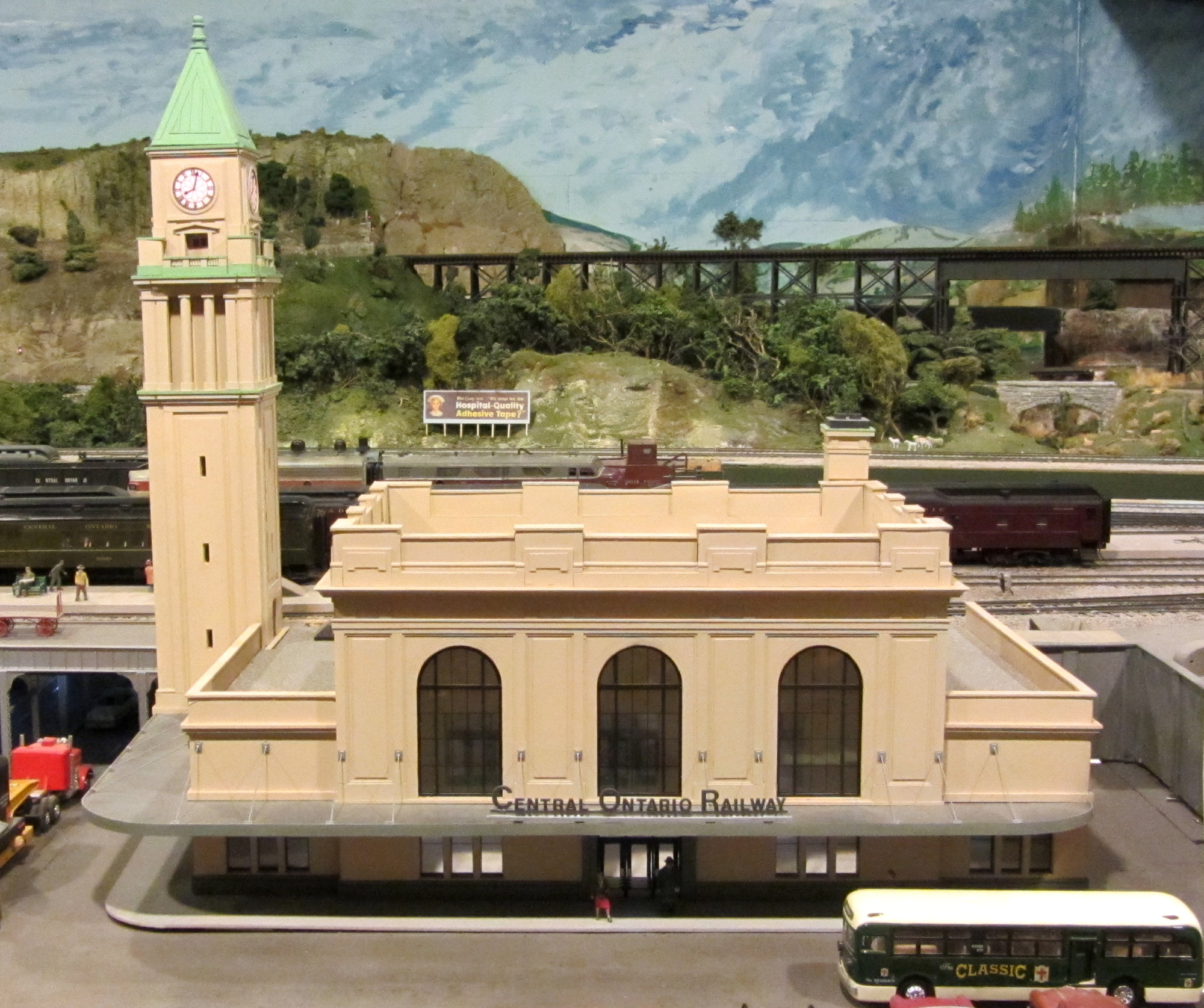
A model of the station created by the Model Railway Club of Toronto

The original building measured 75 feet, 9 inches, by 114 feet, 2 inches, with a midway and baggage room built under the tracks that measured 156 feet, 8 inches, by 81 feet, 1 inch, and clock tower was 24 feet, 9 inches, square. The clock tower stands 140 feet tall and, estimating from the photographs, the main building is about 50 feet high. Once entered, the building only has one floor with the rails elevated by an embankment that allows passage underneath without having to change floors. Additions in 2003 added a triangular section to the north side of the building that includes more retail space and a loading dock, pushing the west façade tight to the side walk bordering Yonge Street, and also extending the eastern side of the building to include another loading dock. The scale is quite grand and is apparent by the 38 foot high ceiling as one enters into what once was the main waiting area. The public areas are at a large scale that tapers once one circulates to the midway under the tracks, and would have opened up again once one were to move up to the platform, because, at the time of construction the embankment built for the tracks would have been one of the higher points in the vicinity.

The building uses a largely monochromatic palette of materials. Its exterior is faced in beige Tyndall limestone from Manitoba, while the interior makes extensive use of beige, brown and green marble, with light-brown terrazzo flooring. Contrasting elements include the ornate white plaster ceilings of the waiting room and the green copper spire of the clock tower. Steelwork used for the overpass and exterior covered areas is finished in similarly muted tones.

The materials also provide variation in texture and detail. The limestone is lightly rusticated and contains visible fossil markings, while the marble displays natural variations in veining.

The station can be broken down into three main areas: the main building, encompassing the waiting room, ticket office and concourse; the clock tower; and the area underneath the tracks that include the midway and baggage area, leading up to the platforms.

The breaking down of components into 'threes' figures heavily in the building, from three separate programmatic elements to the main building being broken down into three sections. Having the elevation drop on either side to give it an ABA rhythm breaks the main building into three and the groupings go further. There are three very large arched windows with the main entrance set at ground level in the center. At ground level there is also a grouping of three smaller windows set to either side of the entrance under the large arched windows as well as a grouping the same size to either side. Vertically, the elevation is also broken into three main components: the ground level, which is given a human scale with the overhang, and included smaller windows and entrance; the second level is the tallest, and includes three large arched windows; and the third grouping, a relatively simple frieze, cornice and parapet. The plaster ceiling in the waiting room is also broken into three sections by two large beams and unity is drawn from outside to inside by the dentil detail in the plaster and on the cornice. The interior also follows the same hierarchy as the exterior by having changes in the wall treatments. The marble makes a break at what seems to be traditional ceiling height to give the retail space a human scale, while the rest of walls are pure marble all the way the ceiling which makes the third part. The concourse, which is still in the main building but acts as a transition to the area underneath the tracks, has a vaulted ceiling broken in the three separate elements.

The clock tower also follows this rule of threes. In elevation it has a heavy robust base that is taller than the rest of the building. This is topped with another section that is more ornate, yet lighter, detailed with two columns to make three bays, and finally the actual clock and roof. The clock tower is modeled after the Campanile of St. Mark's in Venice, which had collapsed and was being rebuilt shortly before the construction of the station began. It is an interesting effect of the tower getting lighter with higher elevation. The bottom tier is mostly stone with only a vertical line of very narrow fenestration. The second tier becomes much lighter with the intercolumnation and having the stone wall set a distance behind the columns to give it the depth needed to create a sense of openness. The third tier completes the lightness by becoming narrower and employing a steep and slender roofline.

== See also ==
- Union Station (Toronto)
