= Leaside station (Canadian Pacific Railway) =

Railway station in Toronto, Ontario, Canada

Leaside
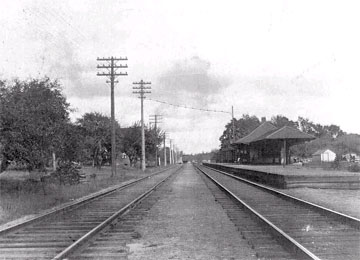
- Original CPR station in 1899

General information
- Location: 50 Village Station Road, Toronto, Ontario; Canada
- Coordinates: 43°42′16″N 79°21′22″W
- Owner: Metrolinx

History
- Opened: 1894
- Closed: 1982
- Rebuilt: 1946

Former services
Preceding station	Canadian Pacific Railway	Following station
Don toward Detroit	Detroit – Montreal	Agincourt toward Montreal Windsor
North Toronto toward Detroit	Detroit – Montreal	Agincourt toward Montreal Windsor
Don toward Toronto	Toronto – Montreal via Peterboro	Agincourt toward Montreal Windsor
Location

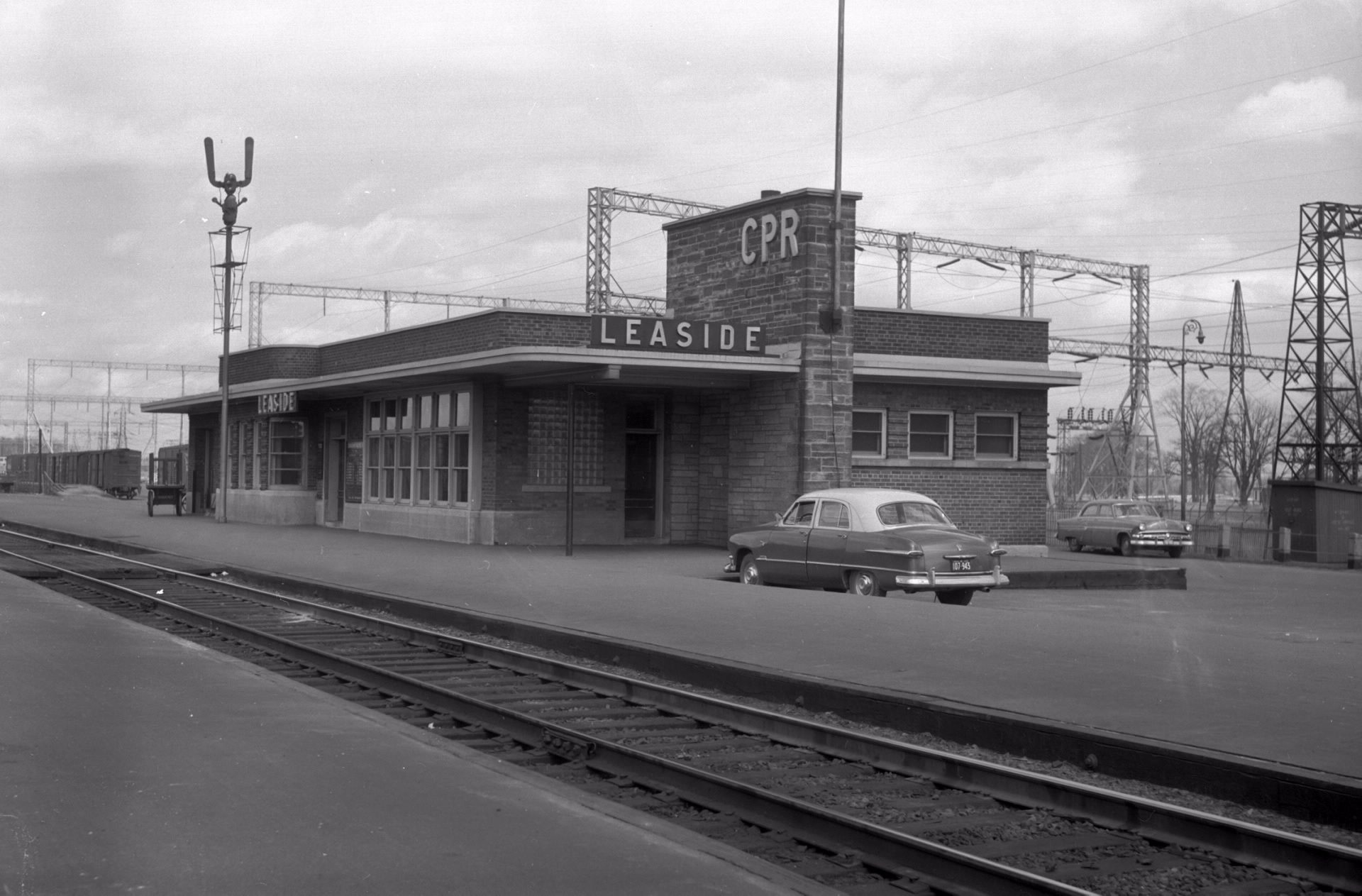
1946 station built in the International Style

Leaside station is a former railway station in Toronto that served Leaside and Thorncliffe Park. The Canadian Pacific Railway built the station in 1894 to serve the new community of Leaside, on a railway line leased from the Ontario and Quebec Railway.

That wooden frame structure burned down in the 1940s and was replaced by a more contemporary building in 1946. Passenger service ended in 1982, a few years before Via Rail’s Toronto to Havelock route was discontinued.

Metrolinx began demolition of the former station in June 2022 as part of its early works for the construction of the Ontario Line maintenance and storage facility (MSF) in Thorncliffe Park.

== History ==
The first railway company to come to Leaside was the Ontario and Quebec Railway, in the 1870s. The Canadian Northern Railway purchased some land north of that in 1906, for a locomotive repair shop and marshalling yard.

When the CPR built a new line, connecting Leaside Junction down through the Don Valley via Don Station to Union Station in 1892, it gave the station more prominence and enabled additional train service.

Between 1975 and 1983 the building was operated by CP Hotels for the Village Station Restaurant and for a short time after that was used as a CPR business centre and CPR Police office.

Under Metrolinx's regional transportation plan, The Big Move, consideration has been given to providing through GO Train service to Seaton from Union Station. The earlier MoveOntario 2020 plan was to serve Peterborough by way of the Midtown Corridor.
