= MoveOntario 2020 =

2007 plan for rapid transit projects in the Greater Toronto Area

MoveOntario 2020 was a 2007 plan proposed by the Government of Ontario that would fund 52 rapid-transit projects throughout the Greater Toronto and Hamilton Area in Ontario, Canada. It was succeeded by The Big Move and GO Transit's Go 2020.

== History ==
On June 15, 2007, Premier Dalton McGuinty and Minister of Transportation Donna Cansfield announced the government's plan to fund 52 projects in Ontario to improve transit services provided by GO Transit, the Toronto Transit Commission, York Region Transit's Viva bus rapid transit system, Durham Region Transit, Mississauga Transit, Brampton Transit, and the Hamilton Street Railway.

Construction on 902 kilometres (560 mi) of new or improved rapid transit was to start in 2008 and be in place by 2020. The Government of Ontario committed two-thirds of the estimated $17.5 billion cost, and asked the Government of Canada to provide the remaining one-third. Municipalities were not expected to contribute to the capital cost of the projects, but would be responsible for any operating subsidies required.

Simultaneous with the announcement of MoveOntario 2020, the government announced its intention to fund the development of rapid transit in Kitchener-Waterloo in the same fashion as the MoveOntario projects (i.e., a two-thirds commitment, with the federal government paying the balance). Thus while the Kitchener-Waterloo RT project was not a formal part of MoveOntario 2020, the government promised to treat it in the same fashion as the MoveOntario 2020 projects. Despite this, the provincial government would ultimately fund just one third of the project, leaving the Region of Waterloo with a $250 million shortfall to cover, largely through increases to property taxes in the cities of Kitchener and Waterloo.

The project was widely seen as a key campaign promise by McGuinty for the 2007 Ontario general election.

MoveOntario 2020 initiatives subsequently fell under the umbrella of Metrolinx's regional transportation plan (RTP), called The Big Move. The final version of the RTP was released in November 2008.

== Projects ==
All projects subject to the review of Metrolinx.

=== GO Transit ===
GO Rail extensions

- GO Lakeshore East rail line extension from Oshawa to Bowmanville
- GO Richmond Hill rail line extension to Aurora Road

GO Rail extensions/capacity expansions

- GO Barrie rail line extension and capacity expansion from Bradford to Barrie

GO Rail capacity expansions

- GO Barrie rail line capacity expansion from Union Station to Bradford
- GO Georgetown rail line (currently Kitchener line) capacity expansion from Union Station to Georgetown
- GO Lakeshore West rail line capacity expansion by adding a third track from Port Credit to Oakville
- GO Lakeshore West rail line capacity expansion by adding a third track from Burlington to Hamilton
- GO Lakeshore East rail line capacity expansion by adding a third track from Union Station to Scarborough
- GO Milton rail line capacity expansion from Union Station to Milton
- GO Richmond Hill rail line capacity expansion from Union Station to Richmond Hill
- GO Stouffville rail line capacity expansion from Union Station to Stouffville and extension of the line to Uxbridge

New GO Rail lines

- GO Crosstown rail line between Weston Road and the Don Valley
- GO Crosstown rail line between the Don Valley and Agincourt via Leaside
- GO rail line from Union Station to Bolton
- GO rail line on the Havelock line from Agincourt to Pickering
- GO rail line on the Seaton line from Agincourt to Brock Road in Pickering

GO Rail conversion

- GO Lakeshore rail line electrification (SuperGO)

GO Bus Rapid Transit

- GO Bus Rapid Transit along Highway 403 from Oakville GO rail station to Mississauga
- GO Bus Rapid Transit northwest Toronto link from Renforth Drive to York University
- GO Bus Rapid Transit on Markham Road from Highway 407 in Markham to Highway 401
- GO Bus Rapid Transit on Highway 401 from Markham Road in Scarborough to Pickering GO rail station
- GO Bus Rapid Transit connector on Highway 427 from Renforth Drive to Highway 407
- GO Bus Rapid Transit along Highway 407 from York University to Langstaff (Yonge Street) and on to Markham Road
- GO Bus Rapid Transit along Highway 407 from Burlington to Highway 401
- GO Bus Rapid Transit along Highway 407 from Highway 401 to Highway 427
- GO Bus Rapid Transit along Highway 407 from Highway 427 to York University

=== Toronto Transit Commission ===
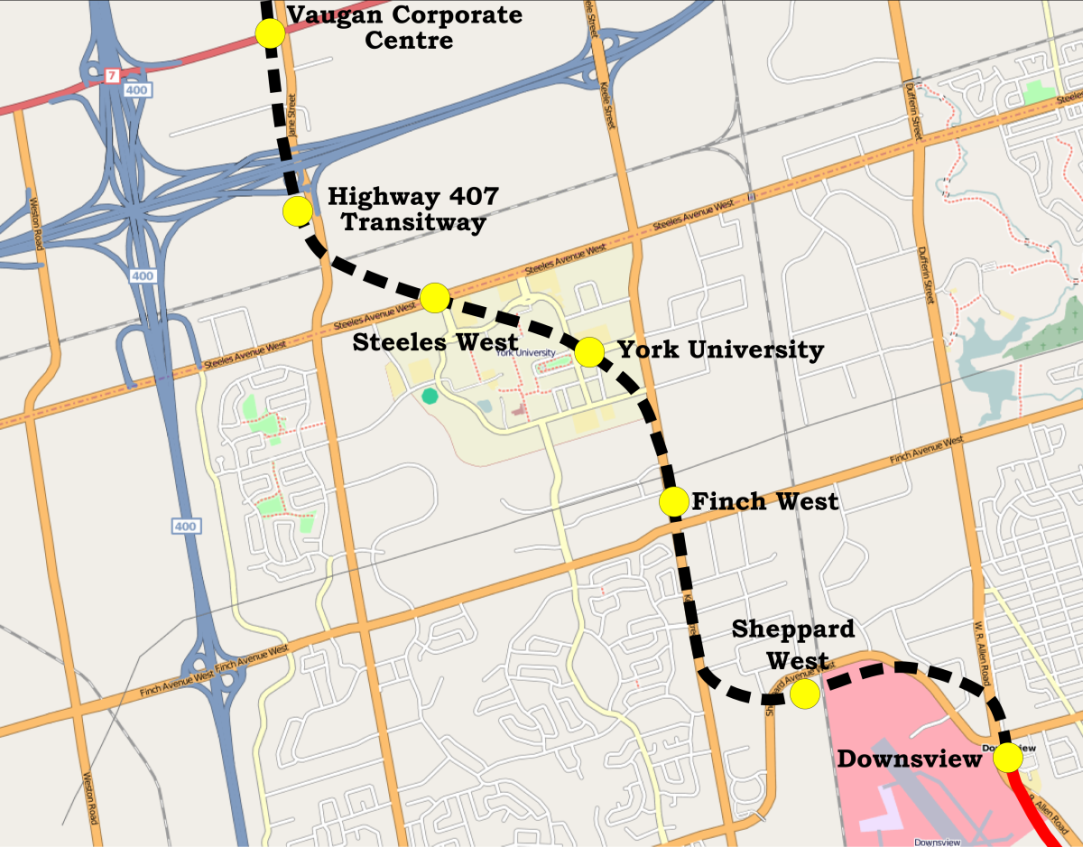
Spadina Line extension into York Region.

Subway/RT extensions

- Spadina subway line extension north from Downsview to Highway 7 (Vaughan Corporate Centre)
- Yonge subway line extension north from Finch station to Highway 7 (Langstaff Road)
- Scarborough subway extension from Kennedy station to Sheppard East (to replace the current Scarborough RT line)

New Light Rail Transit lines

- Waterfront West Light Rail Transit from Union station to Long Branch
- Sheppard Avenue Light Rail Transit from Don Mills station to Morningside Avenue
- Finch Avenue West Light Rail Transit from Humber College to Finch West station
- Don Mills Road Light Rail Transit from Steeles Avenue to the Bloor-Danforth subway
- Jane Street Light Rail Transit from Pioneer Village station to Jane station
- Malvern Light Rail Transit from Kennedy station to Malvern
- Eglinton Crosstown line from Mount Dennis to Kennedy station in Scarborough

TTC Transitway development

- Yonge surface transit improvements from Finch station to Steeles Avenue

=== York Region Transit/Viva ===
New Viva Bus Rapid Transit lines

- Viva Markham North-South Link from Markham Centre to Don Mills station

Viva Transitway development

- Viva Yonge Street from Steeles Avenue to Highway 7 (Langstaff)
- Viva Yonge Street from Highway 7 (Langstaff) to 19th Avenue in Richmond Hill
- Viva Yonge Street from 19th Avenue to Newmarket
- Viva Highway 7 from Highway 50 to Yonge Street (Langstaff)
- Viva Highway 7 from Yonge Street (Langstaff) to Cornell

=== MiWay (formerly Mississauga Transit) ===
Mississauga Transitway (BRT)

- Mississauga Transitway west of Mississauga City Centre to Winston Churchill Boulevard
- Mississauga Transitway east of Mississauga City Centre to Renforth Drive

New Light Rail Transit lines

- Dundas Street West Light Rail Transit from Kipling station to Hurontario Street
- Hurontario Light Rail Transit from Queen Street in Brampton to Lakeshore Road in Mississauga

=== Other projects ===
Hamilton Rapid Transit proposed corridor.

Pearson air-rail link

- Link from Toronto Pearson International Airport to Union Station

Brampton Transit

- Brampton Züm (formerly Acceleride) on Queen Street from Main Street to Highway 50

Durham Region Transit

- Durham rapid transit line on Highway 2 from Oshawa to Pickering

Hamilton Street Railway

- Hamilton east-west LRT(Light Rail Transit) on King/Main Streets from Eastgate Mall to McMaster University
- Hamilton north-south BRT(Bus Rapid Transit) on James/Upper James Streets from Hamilton Airport to Waterfront

== See also ==
- The Big Move
- GO Transit
