= Don station =

Railway station in Toronto, Ontario, Canada

Don
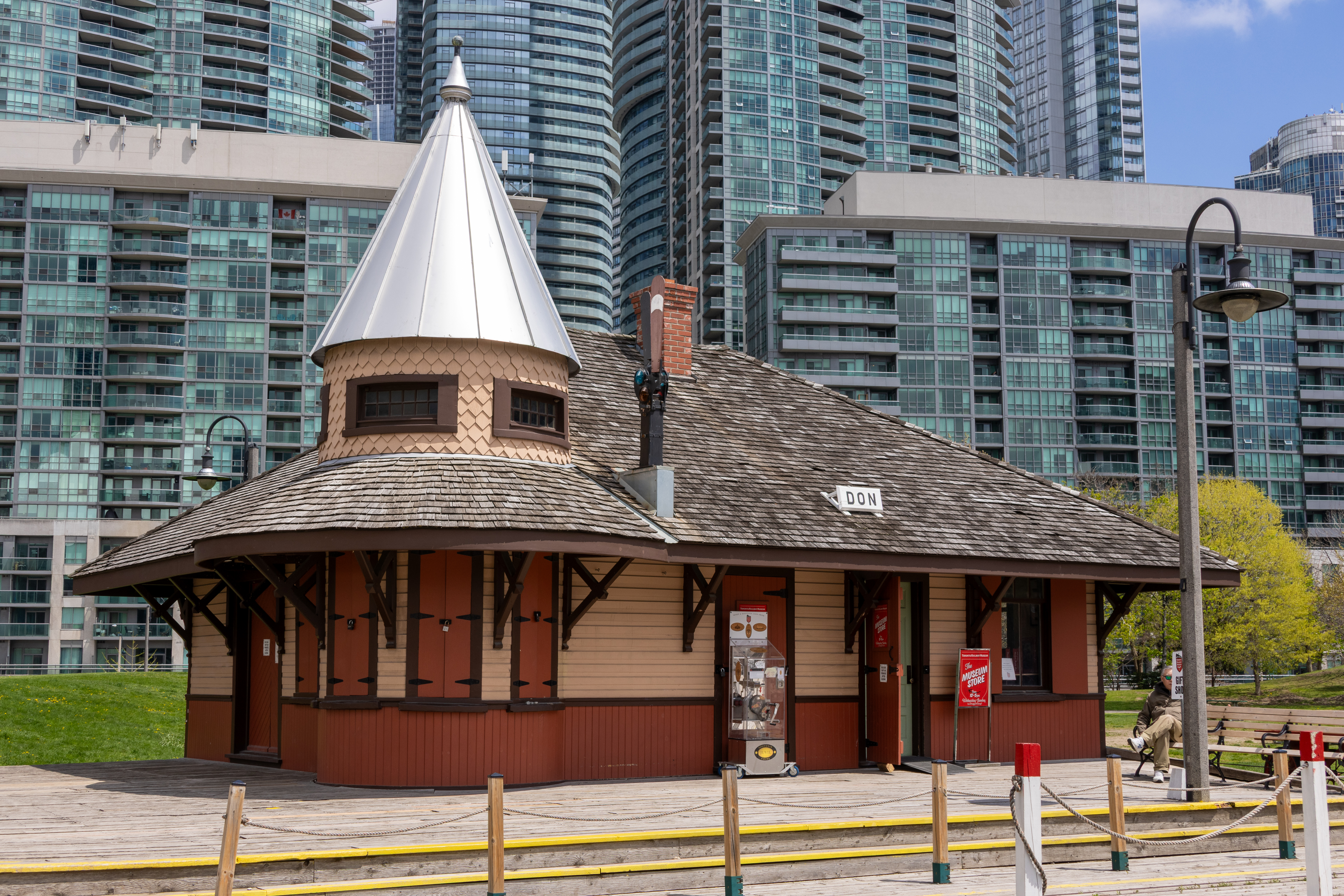
- Don station at Roundhouse Park in 2026

General information
- Location: Queen Street East; Toronto, Ontario; Canada
- Coordinates: 43°39′27″N 79°21′16″W
- Distance: 2 miles (3.2 km) to Union Station

Other information
- Status: Building relocated

History
- Opened: 1896
- Closed: 1967

Former services
Preceding station	Canadian National Railway	Following station
Toronto Terminus	Capreol – Toronto	Oriole toward Capreol
Toronto Terminus	CNoR Toronto – Cobourg Removed 1920s	Malvern toward Cobourg
Preceding station	Canadian Pacific Railway	Following station
Toronto toward Detroit	Detroit – Montreal	Leaside toward Montreal Windsor
Toronto Terminus	Toronto – Montreal via Peterboro	Leaside toward Montreal Windsor
Location

Don railway station was built in 1896 by the Canadian Pacific Railway (CPR) on the western bank of the Don River at the south side of Queen Street in Toronto.

== History ==
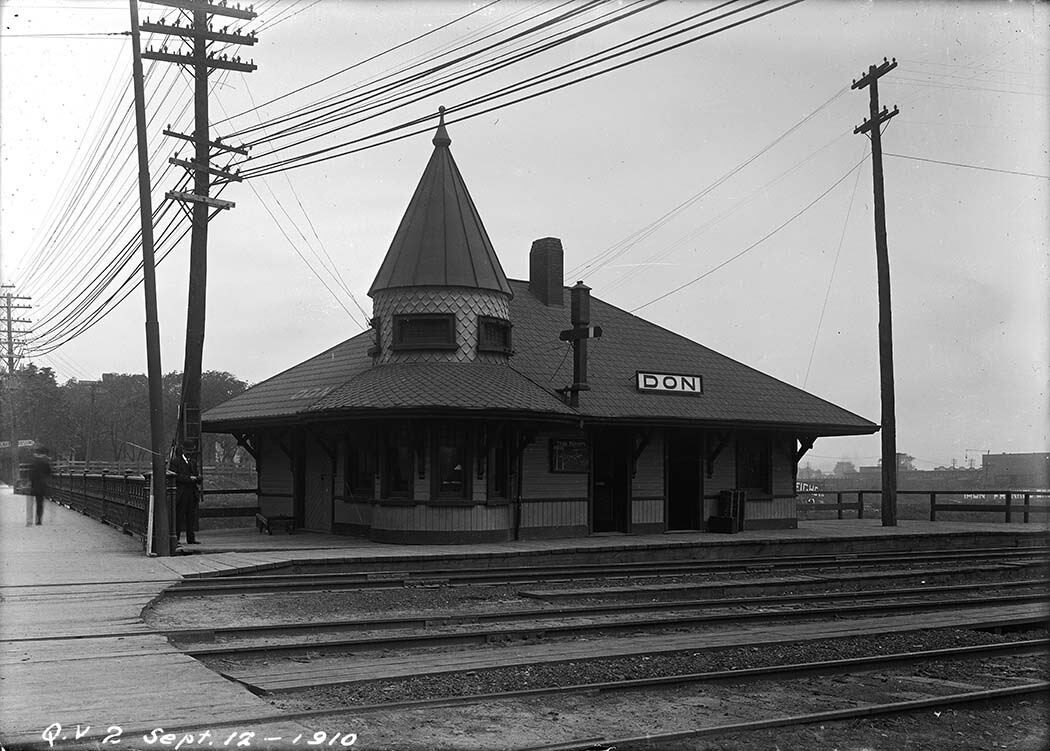
Station at its original Queen Street location in 1910

Permission was given to the CPR to build a branch line (Don Branch) from Leaside to downtown Toronto. In 1892 the railway company completed construction of the line and the Don Station opened for business in February 1896.

A collision in 1904 several blocks east of here at the Riverdale Station level crossing, between a Toronto Railway Company streetcar and a freight train, which killed three people and injured seventeen, showed the danger of such urban crossings. This resulted in the station building being moved farther south, to allow the City of Toronto to build a higher bridge in 1911, which carried Queen Street over the railway tracks, river and roadways.

The Canadian Northern Railway began using the Don Station in 1906, which sharing continued by the Canadian National Railway (CNR) after they absorbed the company. The pool train arrangement between CPR and CNR in 1933 resulted in the station's decline in importance, as most CPR trains then moved to the more direct CNR main line.

The end came in 1967, when trains on the Toronto-Havelock route no longer stopped here, and the building was moved to Todmorden Mills in 1969. For some time it housed a railway heritage exhibit but eventually it was boarded up and closed to the public.

In 2008 the City of Toronto relocated it to Roundhouse Park, where it was repainted and repaired and opened as a reception area for visitors to the Toronto Railway Museum.
