= Union Station (Toronto) =

Major rail hub in Toronto, Ontario, Canada

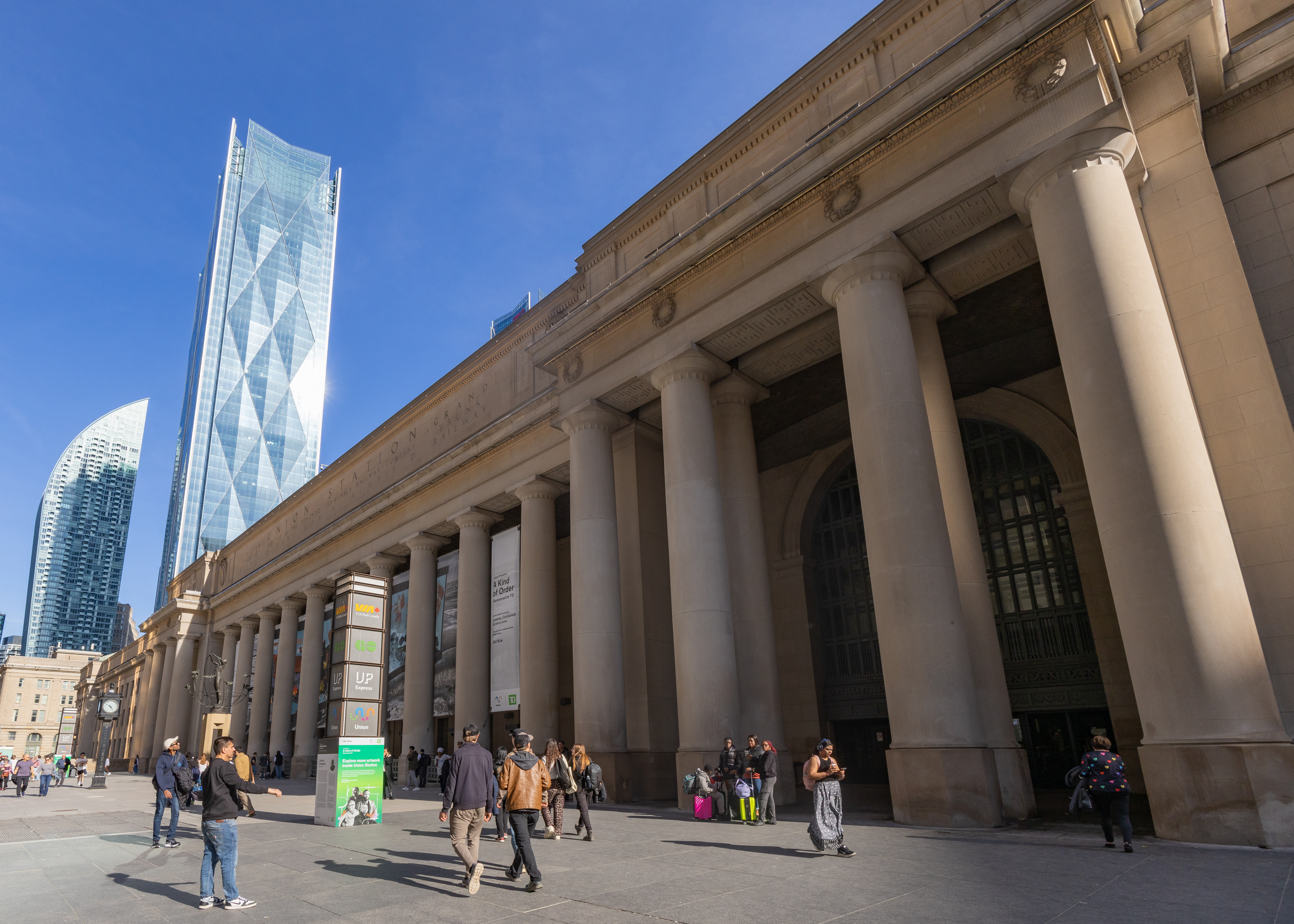
- Union Station façade seen from Front Street

General information
- Location: 65 Front Street West; Toronto, Ontario; Canada
- Coordinates: 43°38′40″N 79°22′49″W
- Owner: City of Toronto (station building); Metrolinx (trainshed and tracks)
- Operator: Toronto Terminals Railway; (Canadian National Railway 50% / Canadian Pacific Kansas City 50%)
- Line: Union Station Rail Corridor
- Platforms: 1 side platform, 11 island platforms
- Tracks: 16
- Connections: at Union (TTC); Union Station Bus Terminal; TTC buses: 19, 72B, 97C, 114, 121, 202, 320

Construction
- Structure type: Elevated
- Parking: No
- Cycle facilities: 115 space parking station
- Accessible: Yes
- Architect: Ross and Macdonald
- Architectural style: Beaux-Arts

Other information
- Status: Staffed station
- Station code: GO Transit: UN; Via Rail: TRTO; Amtrak: TWO
- IATA code: YBZ
- Fare zone: 02
- Website: torontounion.ca

History
- Opened: August 6, 1927; 99 years ago
- Rebuilt: 1970s, 2009–2021
- Electrified: January 2038; 11 years' time (planned)

Passengers
- 2012: 2.91 million ▲0.5% (Via)
- 2015: 69.5 million ▲1.9% (GO Transit)
Services
Preceding station	Via Rail	Following station
Washago toward Vancouver	The Canadian	Terminus
Brampton toward Sarnia	Sarnia–Toronto	Terminus
Oakville toward Windsor	Windsor–Toronto	Terminus
Oakville toward New York	Maple Leaf	Terminus
Terminus	Toronto–Montreal	Guildwood toward Montreal
Terminus	Toronto–Ottawa	Guildwood toward Ottawa
Preceding station	GO Transit	Following station
Downsview Park towards Allandale Waterfront	Barrie	Terminus
Bloor towards Stratford	Kitchener	Terminus
Bramalea towards Stratford	Kitchener (express)	Terminus
Kipling towards Milton	Milton	Terminus
Exhibition towards Confederation	Lakeshore West	Terminus
Clarkson towards Hamilton or Niagara Falls	Lakeshore West (peak express)	Terminus
Exhibition towards Niagara Falls	Lakeshore West (off-peak express)	Terminus
Terminus	Lakeshore East	Danforth towards Oshawa
Terminus	Lakeshore East (express)	Pickering towards Oshawa
Terminus	Stouffville	Kennedy towards Old Elm
Terminus	Richmond Hill	Oriole towards Bloomington
Preceding station	Metrolinx	Following station
Bloor toward Pearson Airport	Union Pearson Express	Terminus
Preceding station	Ontario Northland Railway	Following station
Langstaff toward Cochrane	Northlander (reopening Dec. 10, 2026)	Terminus
Former services
Preceding station	Amtrak	Following station
Malton (1990–2004) toward Chicago	International	Terminus
Oakville (1982–1990) toward Chicago	International	Terminus
Preceding station	Ontario Northland Railway	Following station
Washago toward Cochrane	Northlander (1977–2012)	Terminus
Preceding station	Via Rail	Following station
St. Clair Avenue toward Vancouver	Super Continental	Terminus
Preceding station	Canadian National Railway	Following station
Sunnyside toward Sarnia	Grand Trunk Railway; Main Line	Danforth toward Montreal
Sunnyside toward Sarnia	Grand Trunk Railway; Main Line	Riverdale (closed 1932) toward Montreal
Sunnyside toward Suspension Bridge	Niagara Falls – Toronto; Local stops	Terminus
Parkdale toward North Bay	North Bay – Toronto	Terminus
Parkdale toward Sarnia	Sarnia – Toronto via Lucan Crossing	Terminus
Terminus	Capreol – Toronto	Don toward Capreol
Terminus	CNoR Toronto – Cobourg Removed 1920s	Don toward Cobourg
Terminus	Toronto – Belleville via Peterboro	Danforth toward Belleville
Terminus	Toronto – Port Hope via Peterboro	Danforth toward Port Hope
Preceding station	Canadian Pacific Railway	Following station
Parkdale toward Detroit	Detroit – Montreal	Don toward Montreal Windsor
Terminus	Toronto – Montreal via Peterboro	Don toward Montreal Windsor
Parkdale toward Sudbury	Sudbury – Toronto	Terminus
Parkdale toward Owen Sound	Owen Sound – Toronto	Terminus
Sunnyside toward Hamilton	Hamilton – Toronto	Terminus
Future services
Preceding station	GO Transit	Following station
Terminus	Lakeshore East (planned expansion)	East Harbour Opening 2028 towards Bowmanville

National Historic Site of Canada
- Official name: Union Station (Canadian Pacific and Grand Trunk) National Historic Site of Canada
- Designated: 1975

Heritage Railway Station (Canada)
- Designated: 1989

Ontario Heritage Act
- Official name: Union Station Heritage Conservation District
- Designated: 2006
Location

Union Station is a major railway station and intermodal transportation hub in Toronto, Ontario, Canada. The station is located in downtown Toronto, on Front Street West, on the south side of the block bounded by Bay Street and York Street. The municipal government of Toronto owns the station building while the provincial transit agency Metrolinx owns the train shed and trackage. It is operated by the Toronto Terminals Railway, a joint venture of the Canadian National Railway and Canadian Pacific Railway, which directs and controls train movement along the Union Station Rail Corridor, the largest and busiest rail corridor in Canada. Constructed in 1927, Union Station has been a National Historic Site of Canada since 1975, and a Heritage Railway Station since 1989.

A May 2026 survey by AllClear considered 43 major train stations around the world; the Toronto site placed fifth among the "most luxurious and high-performing rail hubs", the only one in Canada among the top 20.

Its central position in Canada's busiest inter-city rail service area, "The Corridor", as well as being the central hub of GO Transit's commuter rail service, makes Union Station Canada's busiest transportation facility and the second-busiest railway station in North America (behind New York Penn Station), serving over 72 million passengers each year. More than half of all Canadian inter-city passengers and 91 percent of Toronto commuter train passengers travel through Union Station.

Via Rail and Amtrak provide inter-city train services while GO Transit operates regional rail services. The station is also connected to the subway and streetcar system of the Toronto Transit Commission (TTC) at its adjacent namesake subway station. GO Transit's Union Station Bus Terminal, located in CIBC Square, is connected to Union Station by a 40-metre (130 ft) enclosed walkway above Bay Street. The Union Pearson Express, which provides train service to Toronto Pearson International Airport, has a platform a short walk west of the main station building, accessible by the SkyWalk.

== Site location ==
Aerial view of Union Station, located on Front Street between York and Bay Street.

Toronto's Union Station is located at 61 Front Street West, between Bay and York Streets in Toronto's business district, with Toronto's Entertainment District beginning across Bay Street. It is roughly at the city's east-west centre. It is also close to Lake Ontario, which marks Toronto's southern boundary. The southernmost part of the Gardiner Expressway, which lies between Union Station and Lake Ontario, provides easy core access to GO Transit buses. Union Station's columned façade and main entrance faces north, towards downtown Toronto. The Fairmont Royal York Hotel, a former railway hotel, is directly across Front Street from Union Station and can be accessed from the station both at street level and via an underground passageway called Path. The Dominion Public Building, another building from the same era, is just to the east of the station, at the corner of Front and Bay Streets.

Other major buildings near Union Station are Telus Harbour, Royal Bank Plaza, and Brookfield Place. Brookfield Place is home to the Allen Lambert Galleria, a six story high pedestrian thoroughfare, as well as the Hockey Hall of Fame, which holds the Stanley Cup.

Scotiabank Arena, Rogers Centre, Metro Toronto Convention Centre, and the CN Tower are all close by, and are visible from some parts of the station. Like Union Station, these structures were built on former Railway Lands. All of them can be accessed directly from Union Station via the Skywalk. The land around the CN Tower has been converted to a public park. Union Station will soon be linked via a Path bridge on the east side to the Backstage Condominium building at the corner of Esplanade and Yonge Street.

== Structure ==
Toronto's Union Station is Canada's largest and most opulent railway station. The Montreal architecture firm of Ross and Macdonald designed the building in the Beaux-Arts style as a joint venture between the Grand Trunk Railway and the Canadian Pacific Railway, with help from CPR architect Hugh Jones and Toronto architect John M. Lyle. In 1975, the Historic Sites and Monuments Board of Canada cited its design as being of "national architectural significance as one of the finest examples of Beaux-Arts railway station design in Canada".

The bilaterally symmetrical building comprises three connecting box masses facing Front Street West, with the main structure in the middle. Together, the three parts measure 752 feet (229 m) long and occupy the entire south side of the block between Bay Street in the east and York Street in the west.

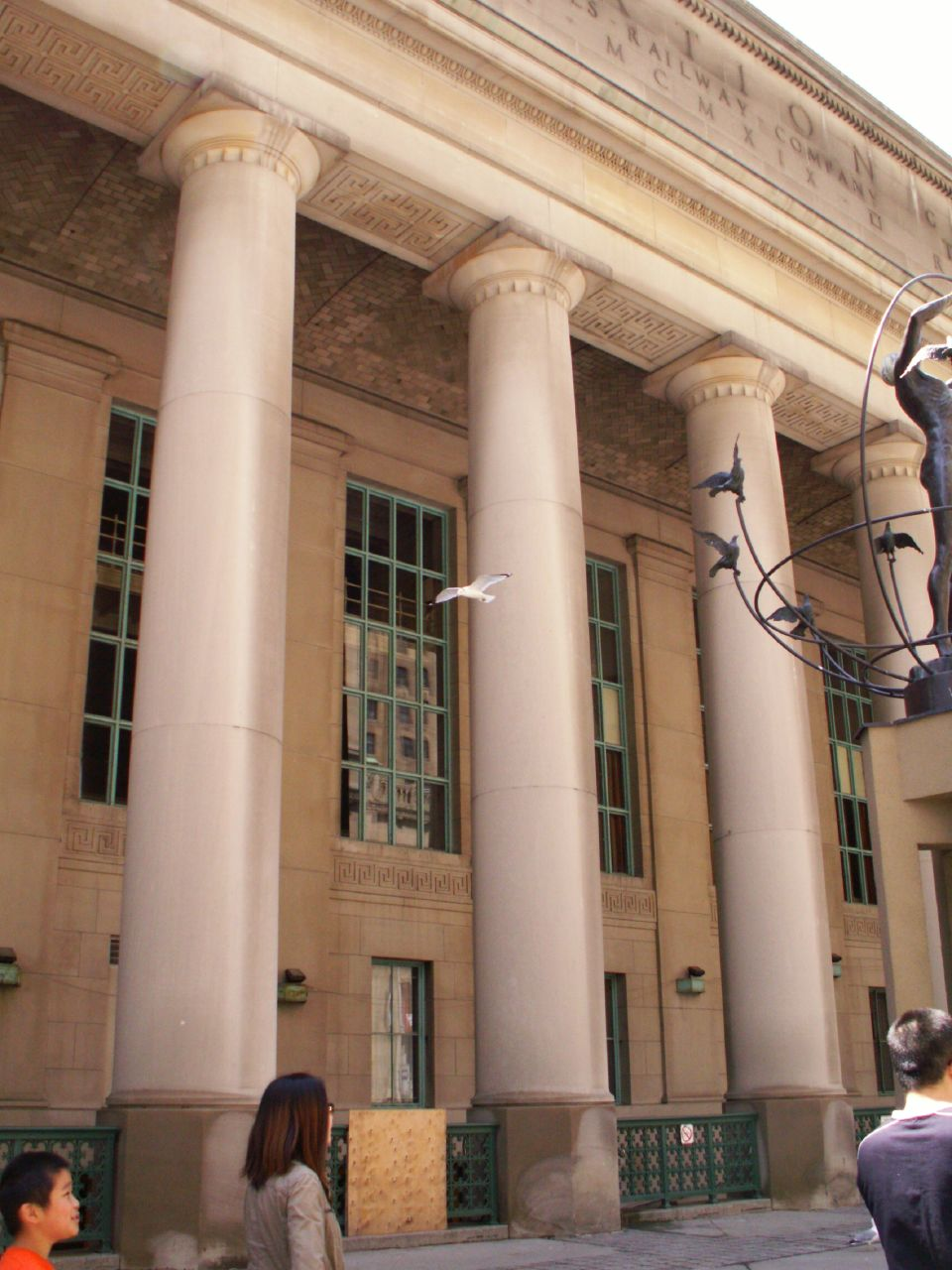
The facade of the Front Street entrance includes 22 colonnaded loggia constructed with limestone.

The exterior Front Street façade is laid out in an ashlar pattern, constructed with smooth beige Indiana and Queenston limestone. The colonnaded loggia which faces Front Street features 22 equally spaced Roman Tuscan columns made from Bedford limestone, each 40 feet (12 m) high and weighing 75 tons. Fourteen three-storey bays, each with severely delineated fenestration, form the façade on either side of the central colonnade for a total of 28 bays. The structures at either end have an additional ten bays. Three rectangular windows fill each bay, lighting the interior hall with plenty of natural light. However, the building's external profile is hard and flat, with a line of huge columns, heavy ornamentation and strong symmetry.

The recessed main entrance is framed by two sets of four columns, with relief wreaths carved into the entablature above the columns. These columns are composed of three separate segments on top of an incongruous octagonal plinth, implying an Ionic order or Corinthian order; however, the capital is sculpted in a Doric order. Consequently, these columns appear to be unfinished. The original plan for the columns is not known.

A wraparound dentil cornice and a recessed peaked hipped roof creates the illusion of a flat roof, just like a palazzo. On either side of the main entrance, a blind arch with an ornamental keystone contains a set of three steel-framed doors, along with a large arched window. Decorative friezes separate the arched window from the doors. When these entryway elements are combined, they create a processional experience through the entryway into the grand interior space. The flat-roof illusion, together with the axial symmetry, classical detailing in both structural and decorative elements, heavy ornamentation, and formal setting is typical of the Beaux-Arts style.

The station housed a gun range on the seventh floor from 1927 until 2008. The range was operated for "Canadian Pacific Railway and Canadian National Railway police to practice their shooting skills. It eventually opened to members of the public". It was known as the Canadian National Recreation Association (CNRA) handgun club. The city closed the range in 2008 as a symbolic gesture to its effort to reduce gun violence.

=== Great Hall and Via Concourse ===
The front entranceway opens on to the expansive Ticket Lobby, informally known as the "Great Hall". This part of Union Station runs the entire length of the main section. It is 250 feet (76 m) long and 88 feet (27 m) high at its highest point. Like the outside facade, enduring materials such as bronze, limestone, marble, tiles, and translucent glass create a sense of enduring quality.

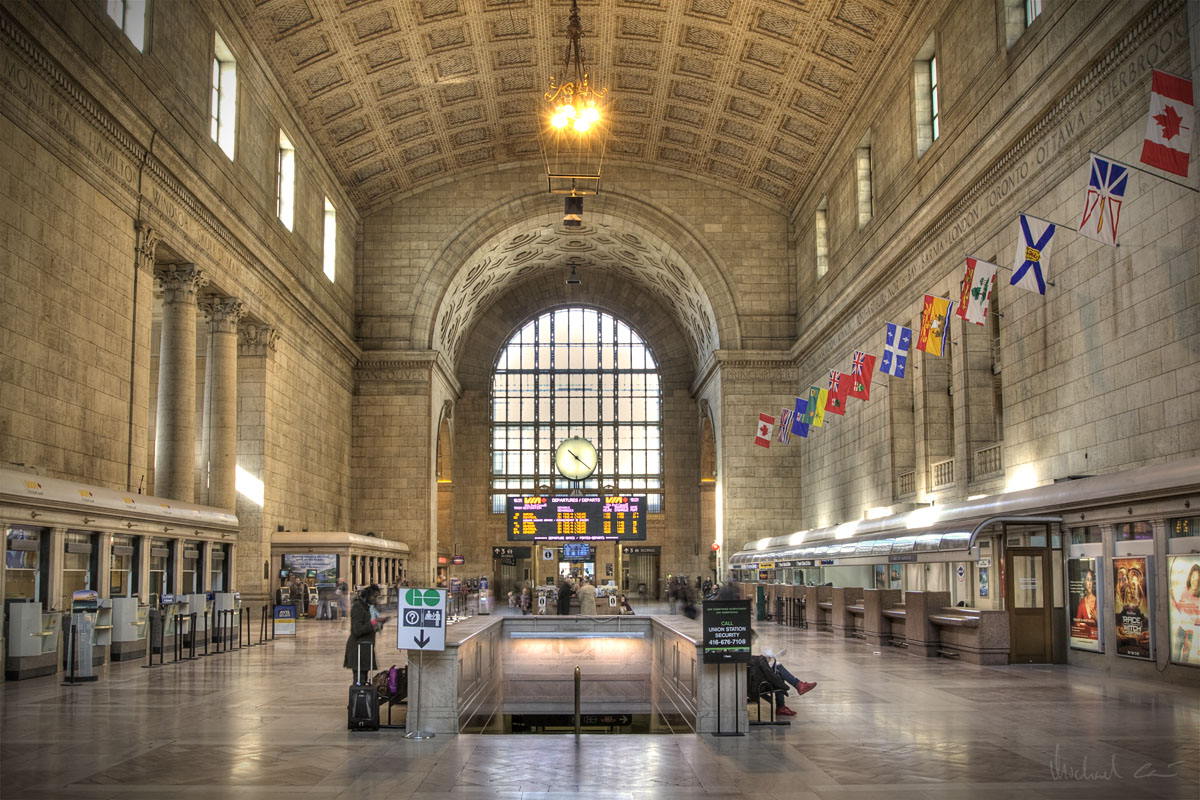
Union Station's ticket lobby, or "Great Hall", is lit with diffused natural light from clerestory windows throughout the lobby.

The entire space is lit with diffused natural light from clerestory windows refracted throughout the lobby. Each end of the Great Hall also features four-storey tall arched windows, based on those of Roman baths.

The two-storey-high vaulted ceiling, which is what makes it look from the front as though a second building were rising behind the colonnade, is made of coffered Guastavino tiles. The walls are faced with Zumbro stone from Missouri, and the floors are constructed of Tennessee marble laid in a herringbone pattern. Below the cornice surrounding the "Great Hall" are carved the names of many Canadian destinations, from the east coast to Vancouver, accessible by the Grand Trunk Railway or Canadian Pacific Railway at the time of the station's construction. Many remain destinations on Via Rail routes.

While historically shared by many different services, the Great Hall is now occupied primarily by Via Rail, whose agents also provide services to Amtrak passengers. The hall is home to Via's ticket and baggage desks, business class lounge, and several small displays, as well as the station's grand clock, a Traveller's Aid desk, and Via's departure board.

=== GO concourses and teamways ===
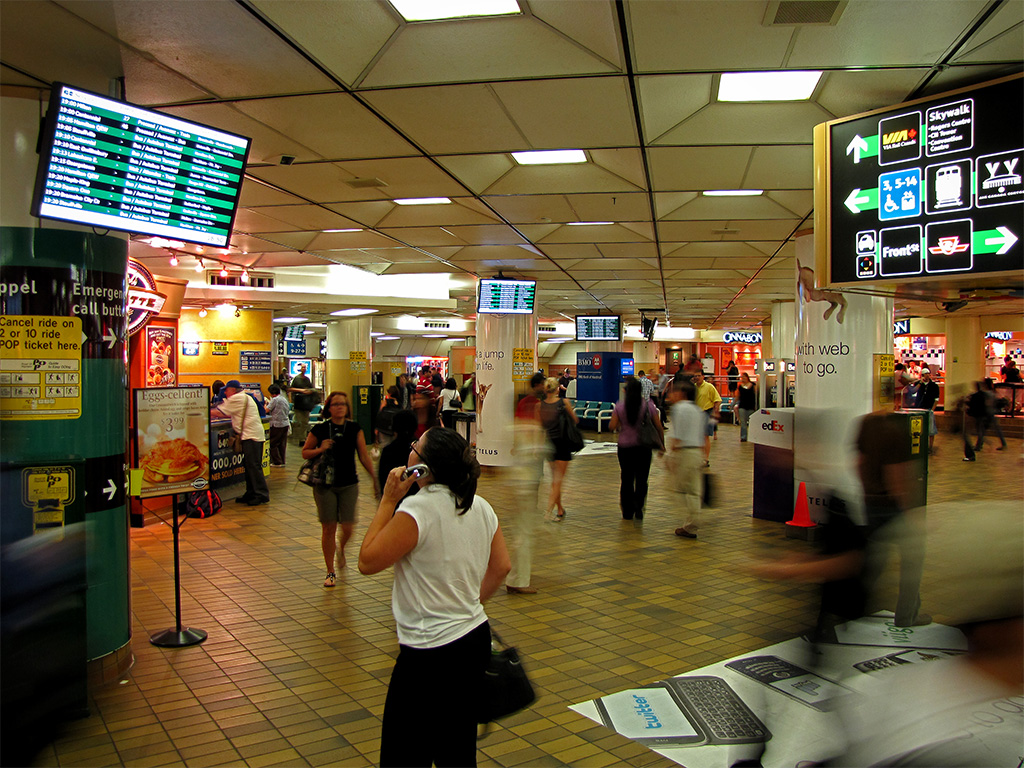
The old Bay Concourse (circa 2009) which was in service from 1978 to 2015

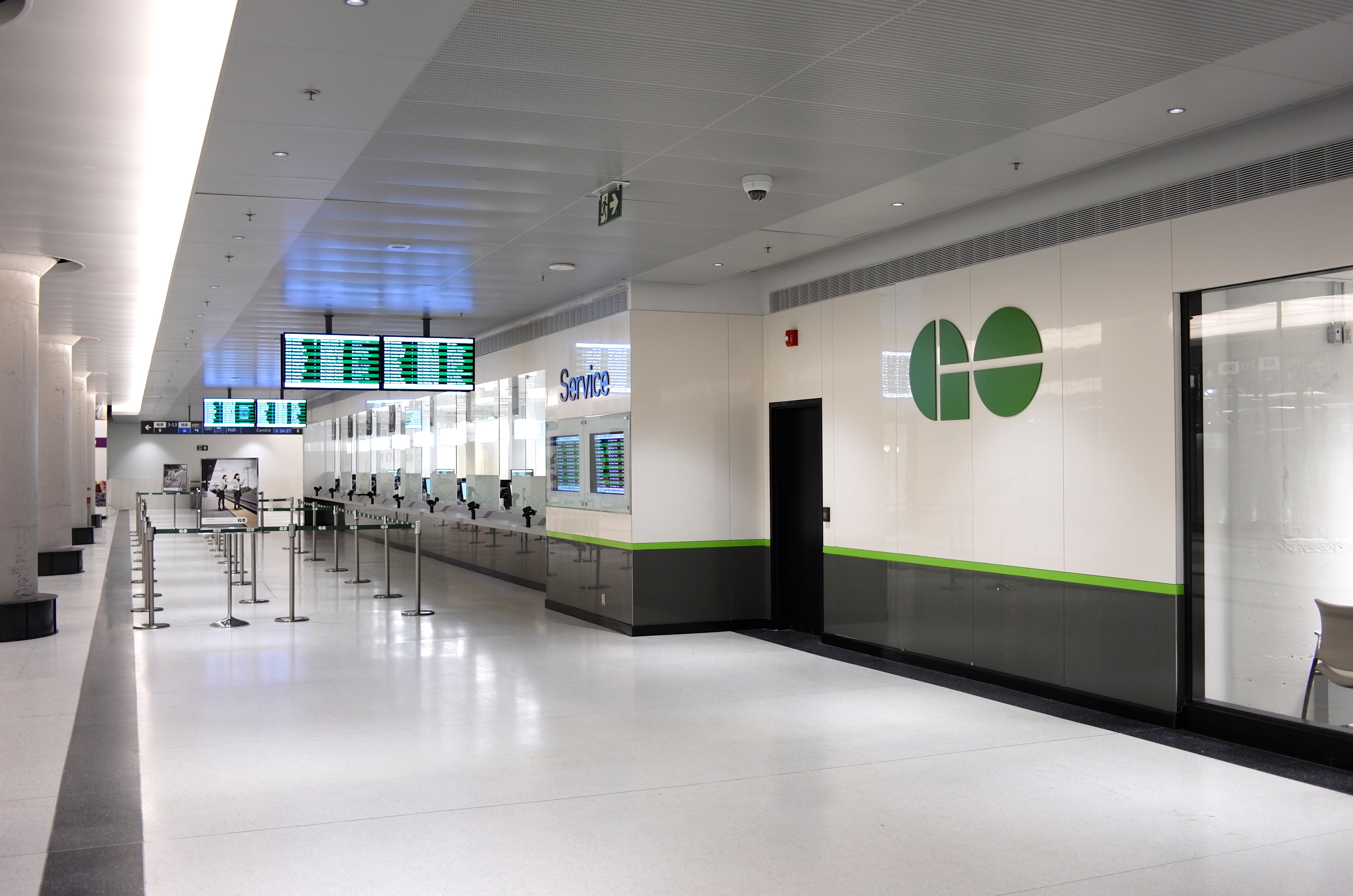
Connections with GO Transit services can be accessed through the York Concourse.

Passengers can connect with GO Transit services through the 62,000 sq ft (5,800 m^{2}) York Concourse, which opened on April 27, 2015, west of Union Station. This new concourse supplemented the York South Concourse that provided access to platforms 24 to 27. The York and York South Concourses connect to the York East Teamway, as well as an entrance to a Path tunnel leading across Front Street, between York Street and University Avenue. The York West Teamway is connected to Union Station via the Skywalk.

Historically, the 3,700-square-metre (40,000 sq ft) Bay Street Concourse was the hub of GO Transit operations for almost 40 years. The Bay Concourse was closed on August 16, 2015, for revitalization. The new Bay Concourse reopened on July 27, 2021, featuring 72 departure screens, 30 Presto devices, seven ticket vending machines and six self-service Presto reload machines. Both the Bay and York concourses give access to GO train platforms.

The Bay West Teamway provides access to platforms 4 to 13 and the Bay South Concourse. The Bay East Teamway provides indoor access to platforms 4 to 13 directly from the Union Station Bus Terminal.

As of 2023, Metrolinx is constructing the new South Concourse. This will connect the south ends of the Bay, Via and York Concourses, and span between Bay and York Streets. It will also provide access to Union Square and Scotiabank Arena.

=== Train shed ===
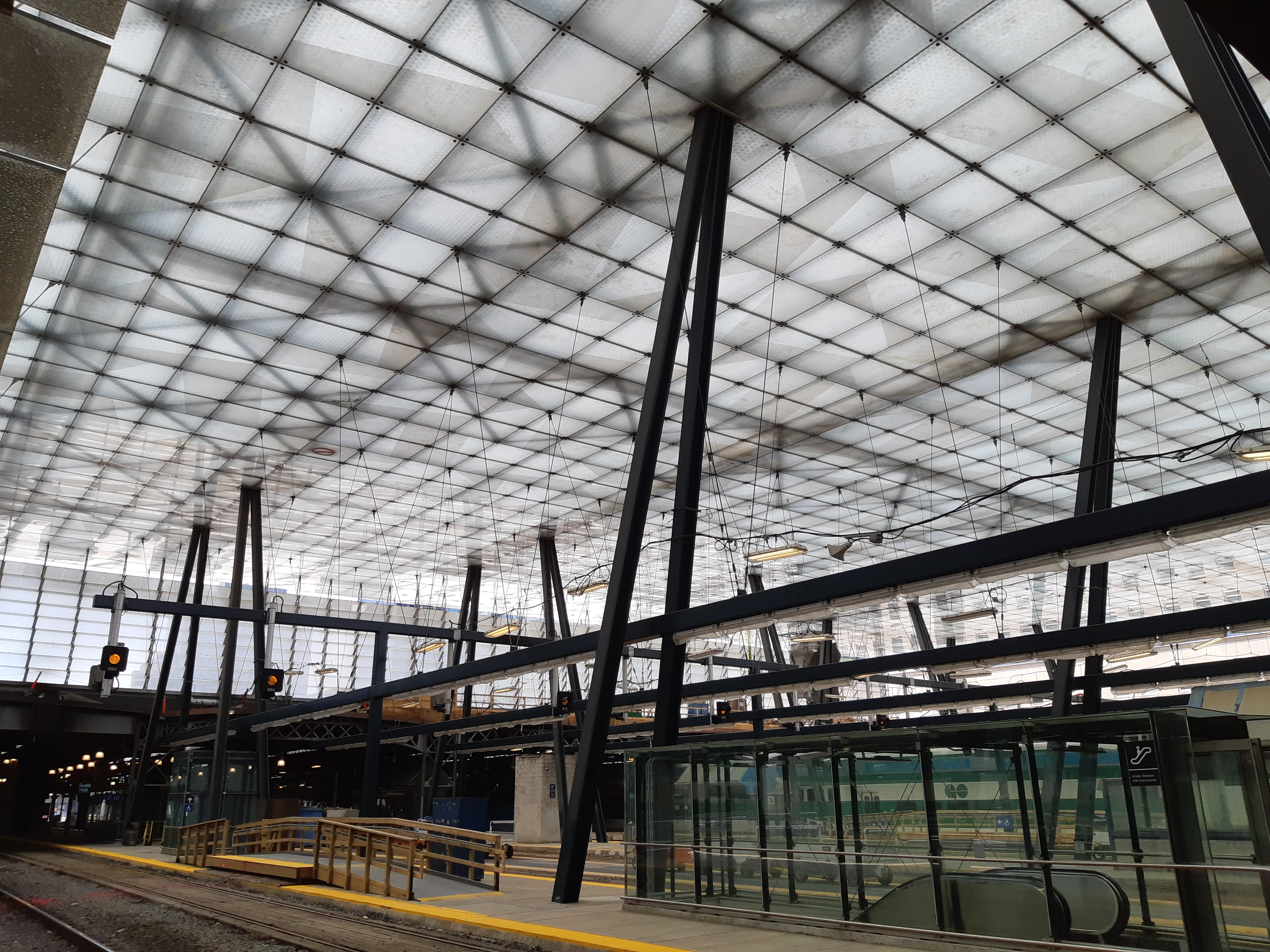
A glass atrium forms the central portion of the train shed.

Trains arrive and depart from the train shed, which contains 23 platforms (11 island platforms and one side platform) south of the Great Hall. On May 11, 2009, the last two platforms were opened, platforms 24/25 between tracks 12 and 13 and platforms 26/27 between tracks 13 and 14 on the south side of the train shed. In July 2022, Metrolinx was having platforms 24 to 27 and their three tracks demolished on the south side of the station in order to replace them with two new tracks and two new wider platforms to increase safety and capacity.

The train shed was designed by A. R. Ketterson and built between 1929 and 1930. It is a variation of the Bush train shed invented by Lincoln Bush. A reconstruction of the train shed began in January 2010. The east and west sides of the shed, totalling approximately 30,000 square metres (320,000 square feet) were renovated and restored with input from Parks Canada to help preserve its heritage character. This renovation came with plans to have a green roof installed, reducing the urban heat island effect and stormwater runoff; however, with the project being almost eight years behind and multiple times over budget, along with the fact that plant-watering logistics would clash with the planned overhead wiring for electrification, the addition of a green roof was cancelled. The central portion of the original train shed, totalling 5,000 square metres (54,000 square feet), was removed and replaced with a glass atrium. The structure, designed by Zeidler Architecture, floats above the tracks and allows daylight to reach the platforms.

Platform 3 is the northernmost platform at Union Station and is the only platform at the station serving just one track. It reopened for service on January 10, 2022, after a renovation of its heritage features. Allowing a lower, lighter shed roof in the age of steam, the smoke vents over tracks 1 and 2 are a preserved heritage feature of the platform 3 area; these were restored. The decorative, cast-iron columns along the platform were restored and reinstalled. Other structural renovations were done along the length of the platform. Once the north tower of the CIBC Square is completed, stair and elevator access will be reinstated between platform 3 and the Bay East Teamway.

Metrolinx media
- Track and platform cross-section at Union station looking west

The 23 platforms are numbered from 3 to 27, but there is no platform 1, 2, 23 or 24. The platforms were renumbered in 2008 for the benefit of operational staff in order to provide a correlation between platform numbers and track numbers. (Prior to the renumbering, the platform numbers had an A or B suffix that proved to be confusing for both customers and operational staff.) Tracks and platforms are each numbered from north to south with track 1 being beside platform 3 on the north side of the train shed. There is an island platform between all pairs of tracks except between tracks 1 and 2 and tracks 11 and 12. Odd numbered platforms are on the north side of a track while even numbered platforms are on the south side of a track. There is a formula to compute the platform number given the track number, with an exception for track 1:

- The number for the platform on the south side of a track equals two times the track number.
- The number for the platform on the north side of a track equals two times the track number minus one, except for track 1 where the platform number is set to 3 rather than 1.

Occasionally, freight trains from both Canadian National and Canadian Pacific networks pass through Union Station using two tracks on the south side of the train shed.

=== West wing and SkyWalk ===
Union Station's west wing is west of the Great Hall. Metrolinx is headquartered in the west wing at 97 Front Street. Across from these offices is an official tourism information centre that provides maps, visitor guides, brochures and tourism specialists to provide help to city visitors.

A pathway known as the SkyWalk continues west from the west wing, overtop of York Street. The SkyWalk is considered part of the Path network, and connects Union to the CN Tower and Rogers Centre. It is also the location of the Union Pearson Express station.

== History ==
=== Predecessor stations ===
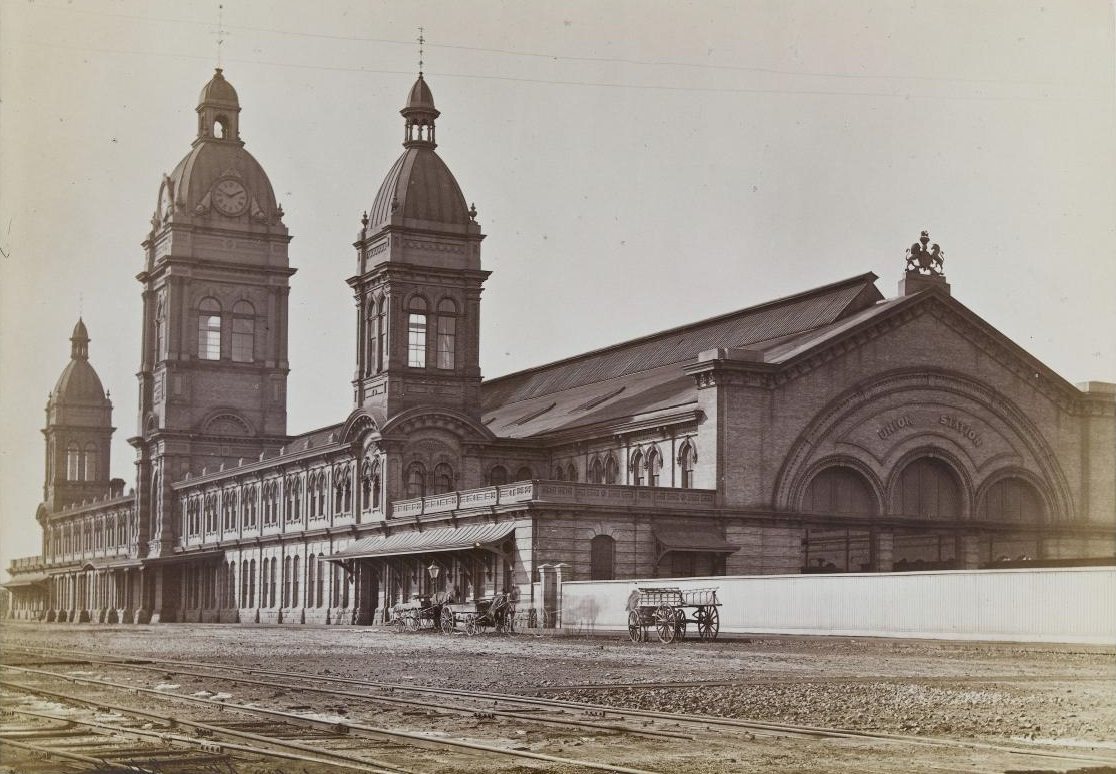
Toronto's second Union Station in 1878, several years after its opening

The current Union Station's history can be traced to 1858, when the Grand Trunk Railway (GTR) opened Toronto's first Union Station west of the present Union Station. The wooden structure was shared with the Northern Railway and the Great Western Railway. This structure was replaced by a second Union Station on the same site, opening in 1873. The Canadian Pacific Railway began using the facility in 1884 and it was completely rebuilt, opening in 1896.

The Great Toronto Fire of 1904 destroyed the block south of Front Street West, immediately east of the second Union Station (bounded by Bay and York streets), but did not damage the station. The GTR acquired this land east of the second Union Station for a new passenger terminal and in 1905 both the GTR and the CPR decided to proceed with the design and construction of a third union station.

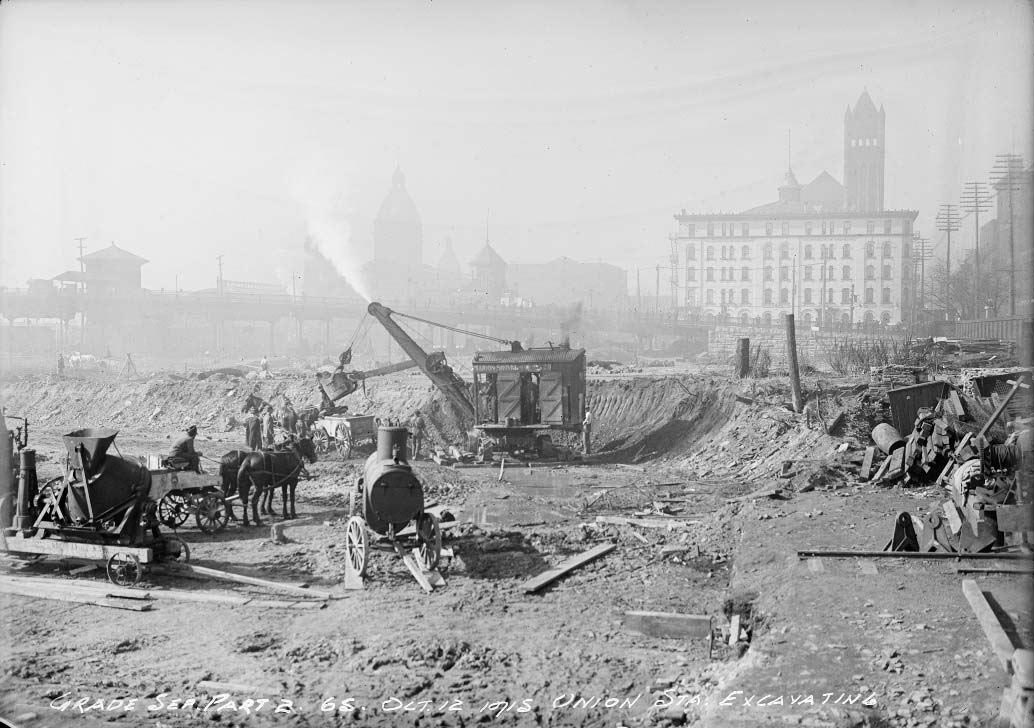
Excavations for the third Union Station in 1915, with second Union Station in background

The decision to undertake the third union station was made against a backdrop of significant change in the Canadian railway industry. At the same time, the Government of Canada was encouraging the GTR to build a second transcontinental railway (what would become the Grand Trunk Pacific Railway and the National Transcontinental Railway) and the Canadian Northern Railway was undertaking an aggressive expansion across the prairies and into southern Ontario.

=== Construction ===
On July 13, 1906, the Toronto Terminals Railway (TTR) was incorporated to "construct, provide, maintain and operate at the City of Toronto a union passenger station". The TTR was jointly owned by the GTR and the CPR who each held 50% of the TTR shares. The TTR supervised construction of the new station which began in 1914 and proceeded to 1920, having faced significant delays in the shortage of construction material and workers as a result of the First World War, as well as the GTR's deteriorating financial position due to its ill-fated transcontinental GTPR railway project.

The resulting construction saw the elimination of Lorne Street located between Simcoe and Bay from Front to Esplanade with tracks leading west of the new station now in place.

Although the new station's headhouse and east and west office wings (the station building visible from Front Street West) were completed in 1920, it did not open to the public for another seven years, until the system of approach tracks was designed and implemented by the TTR and its owners. During this time in 1923, the bankrupt GTR was fully nationalized by the Government of Canada and merged into the Canadian National Railways (CNR), which would assume the GTR's 50% ownership of the TTR and thus the third Union Station.

=== Opening and further construction ===
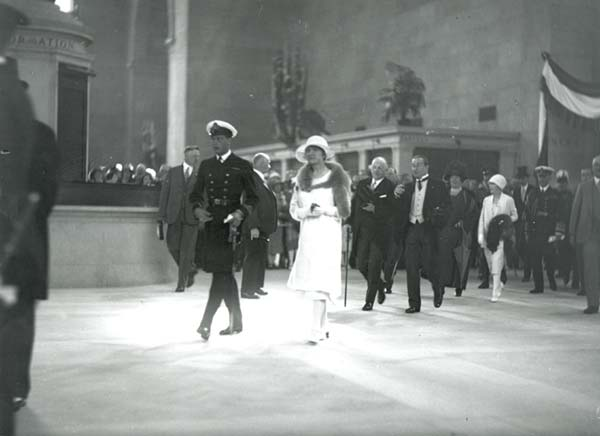
Prince George at the opening of Union Station by his brother, Prince Edward, Prince of Wales, on August 6, 1927

Although the station was incomplete, its building was complete and the station was opened by Prince Edward, Prince of Wales, on August 6, 1927, in a ribbon-cutting ceremony, using a pair of gold scissors. In attendance were Prince George, Lieutenant Governor of Ontario William Donald Ross and his wife, Prime Minister of Canada William Lyon Mackenzie King, Prime Minister of the United Kingdom Stanley Baldwin and Mrs. Baldwin, Premier of Ontario George Howard Ferguson, and other members of the government of Ontario and government of Canada. Prince Edward was the first person to step off of a train into Union Station; a mixed choir composed of soloists from the city's churches sang the royal anthem, "God Save the King", as the royal party walked through the concourse. Once he was in the Great Hall, the Prince of Wales quipped, "you build your train stations like we build our cathedrals". He was then escorted to a nearby Canadian National Railway wicket and was presented with the first ticket issued at the station: one "valid for all time" and "between all stations". He proceeded to the Canadian Pacific Railway's wicket, where he was given a first-class fare from Toronto to High River, Alberta, where his ranch was located. Prince George was given similar tickets.

Four days later, the track network was shifted from the second Union Station. To get to trains, passengers would walk from the south doors to the tracks located several hundred feet to the south while the new viaduct, concourse and train shed were under construction. Demolition of the second Union Station began almost immediately and was completed in 1928. The third Union Station project was not fully completed until 1930 when the train shed was completed; its construction was supervised by the TTR from 1925 to 1930.

The TTR also constructed a central heating plant at the corner of York and Fleet streets (now Lake Shore Boulevard West) to replace the original Toronto Hydro plant on Scott Street which had been expropriated by the TTR to build the approach track viaduct to the new station. It was fuelled by coal delivered by a CNR siding and was the largest such facility in Canada when it opened in 1929; it produced 150,000 kilograms (330,000 lb) of steam per hour and 270,000,000 kilograms (600,000,000 lb) annually to heat the station; the passenger cars in the train shed; CNR and CPR yard facilities in the area now occupied by the Gardiner Expressway, Rogers Centre and Scotiabank Arena; the CPR's Royal York Hotel; the Dominion Public Building; the federal post office building adjacent to the station; and the CN/CP Telecommunications building on Front Street.

=== Subway connection ===
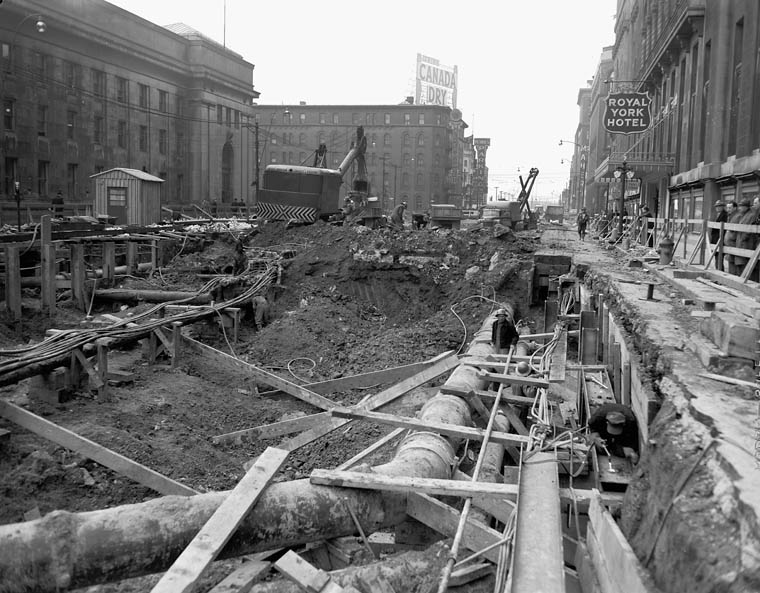
Excavation outside of Union Station on Front Street in 1950 for a subway line

The first major change to Union Station took place in 1954 when the Toronto Transit Commission opened its Union subway station adjacent to Union Station but buried beneath Front Street West. This subway station acted as the southern terminus of its new subway line. The subway station included a direct tunnel connection to the lower level passenger concourse. This passageway was closed and replaced by the direct connection between the railway station and the subway station in 1979 when the subway station mezzanine was renovated and enlarged. In 1990, the TTC's Harbourfront LRT project added an underground streetcar loop now used by the 509 Harbourfront and 510 Spadina streetcar lines. TTC passengers using the Union subway and streetcar station may transfer between both modes without entering Union Station proper.

=== Metro Centre redevelopment proposal ===
During the early 1970s, Canada's two major passenger railways, the Canadian Pacific Railway and Canadian National, were reducing their services to the bare minimum mandated under the Canadian Transport Commission, largely as a result of unsustainable losses caused by increased competition from new subsidized four-lane highways and airports.

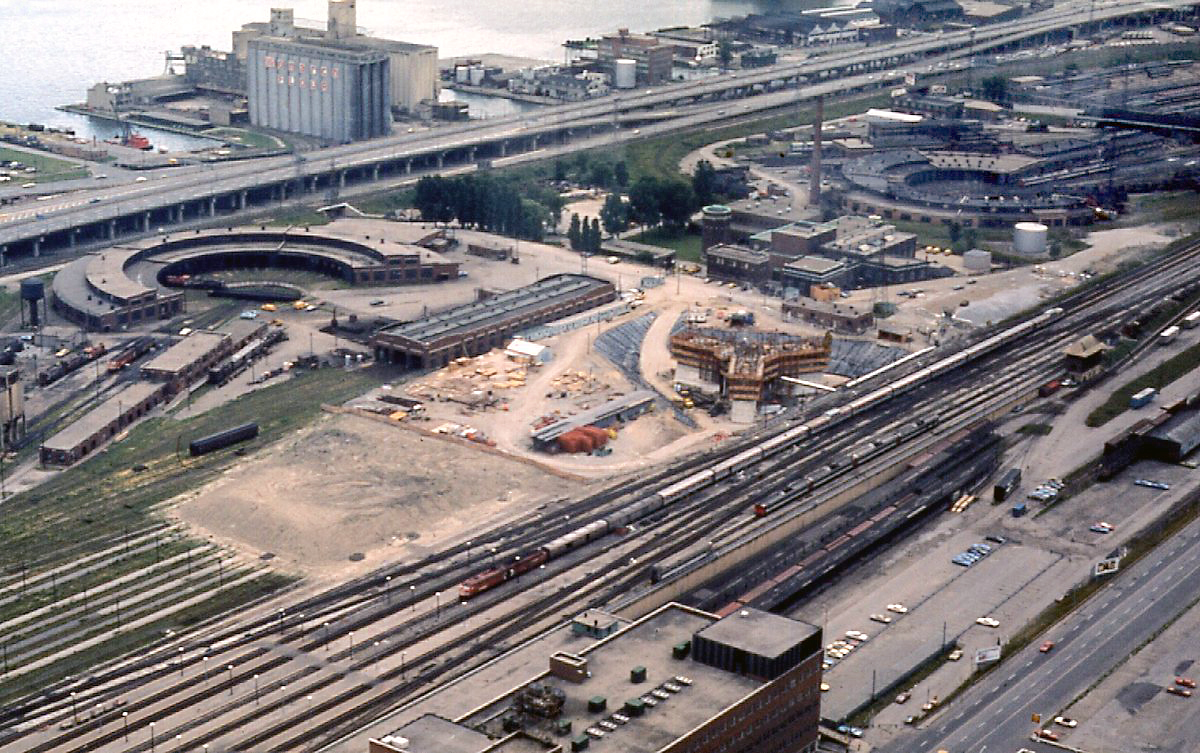
Construction for the CN Tower in 1973. Plans to redevelop the Railway Lands surfaced with freight traffic being diverted outside the downtown core.

The third Union Station's future was looking bleak by 1972, when both railways sought to increase return on their underutilized waterfront rail classification yards which were being viewed as valuable real estate. Both CN and CP began to abandon their extensive waterfront rail classification yards south of the passenger station to make way for urban redevelopment. The Gardiner Expressway project was constructed over part of the railway property and CN had proposed constructing a telecommunication tower (what would become the CN Tower later that decade).

CN and CPR proposed a "Metro Centre" development on the south side of Front Street on the site of Union Station and proposed to demolish the structure (which was costing an increasing amount of property taxes but not bringing in revenue). The proposed Metro Centre development was strikingly similar to what occurred with New York City's Penn Station and would have consisted of an underground fourth Union Station (the terminal trackage would have been buried), a convention centre, a telecommunications tower, along with complementary office and retail developments. Local opposition to the proposal was successful in having the city council's decision to support the Metro Centre development overturned and Union Station was saved.

Although it was converted from coal to natural gas, the Central Heating Plant built in 1929 was decommissioned in the 1980s, and demolished in 1990. It is now the site of the Ice condominium towers.

In 1978, CN and CP transferred responsibility for their passenger rail services to Via Rail, a new federal Crown corporation but retained their 50% ownership shares of the TTR.

=== Growth and waterfront development ===
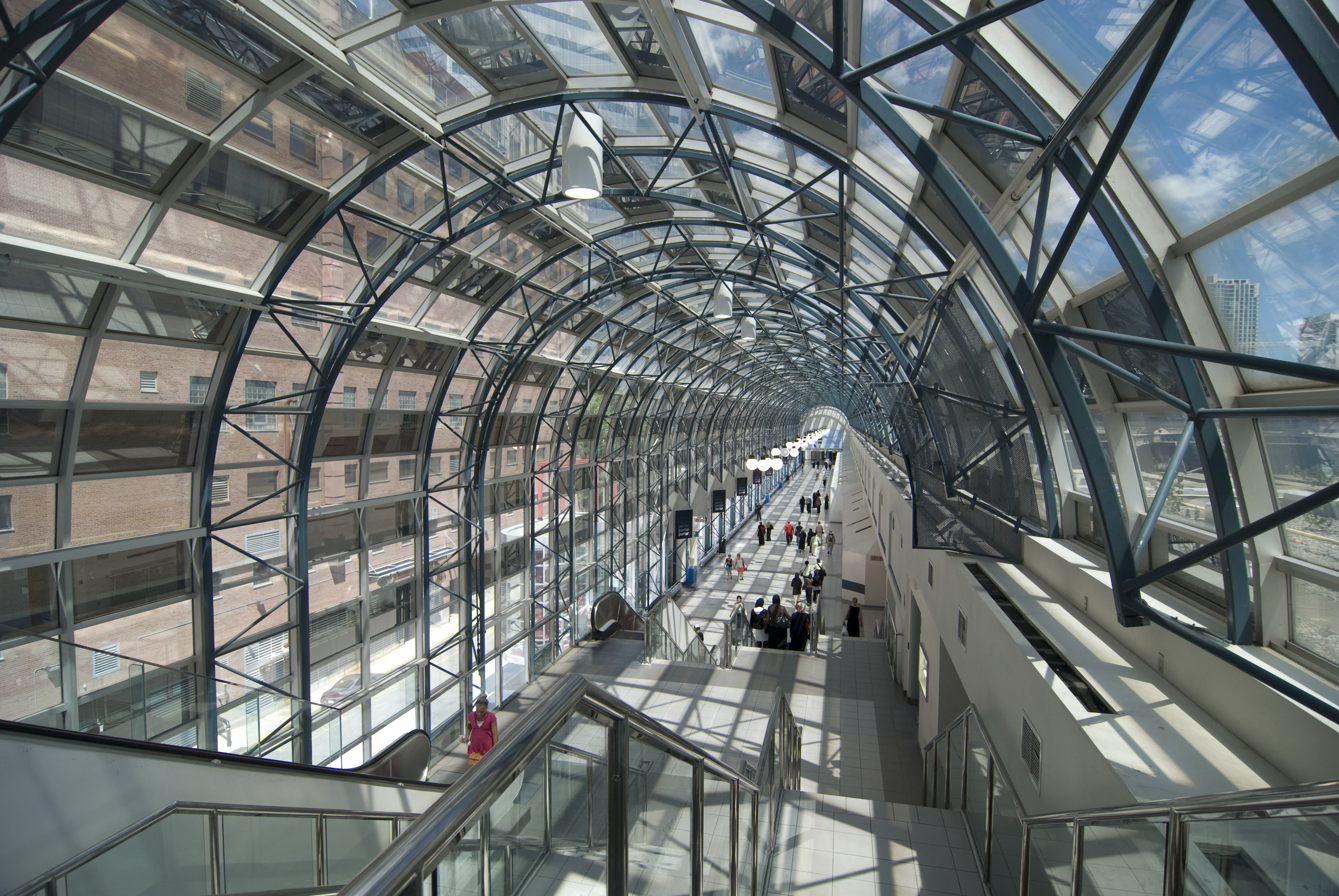
The SkyWalk was constructed over the train tracks of Union Station to connect the Metro Toronto Convention Centre and Rogers Centre with the rest of the Path pedestrian network.

The GO Transit commuter rail agency which was established on May 23, 1967, had been undergoing unprecedented expansion which was seeing Union Station see passenger levels that outstripped some of the busiest airports in the world. The consolidated TTR trackage included a flyover west of the station to permit freight trains to cross CN's Oakville subdivision without blocking GO Transit's commuter trains. The flyover was constructed in 1982–83 and also allowed GO trains destined for the CN Weston subdivision to cross over the tracks used by GO and Via trains using the CN Oakville subdivision.

The CN Tower had revamped the vision of Toronto's waterfront rail yards and proposals were made to construct what would later become SkyDome (1989) and Air Canada Centre (1999), resulting in further changes to the Union Station trackage. The Path pedestrian tunnel network was built to connect Union Station's passengers with many of the downtown office towers and the SkyWalk was constructed over the terminal trackage west of the station to connect the Path with the Metro Toronto Convention Centre and Rogers Centre.

=== 21st century revitalization ===
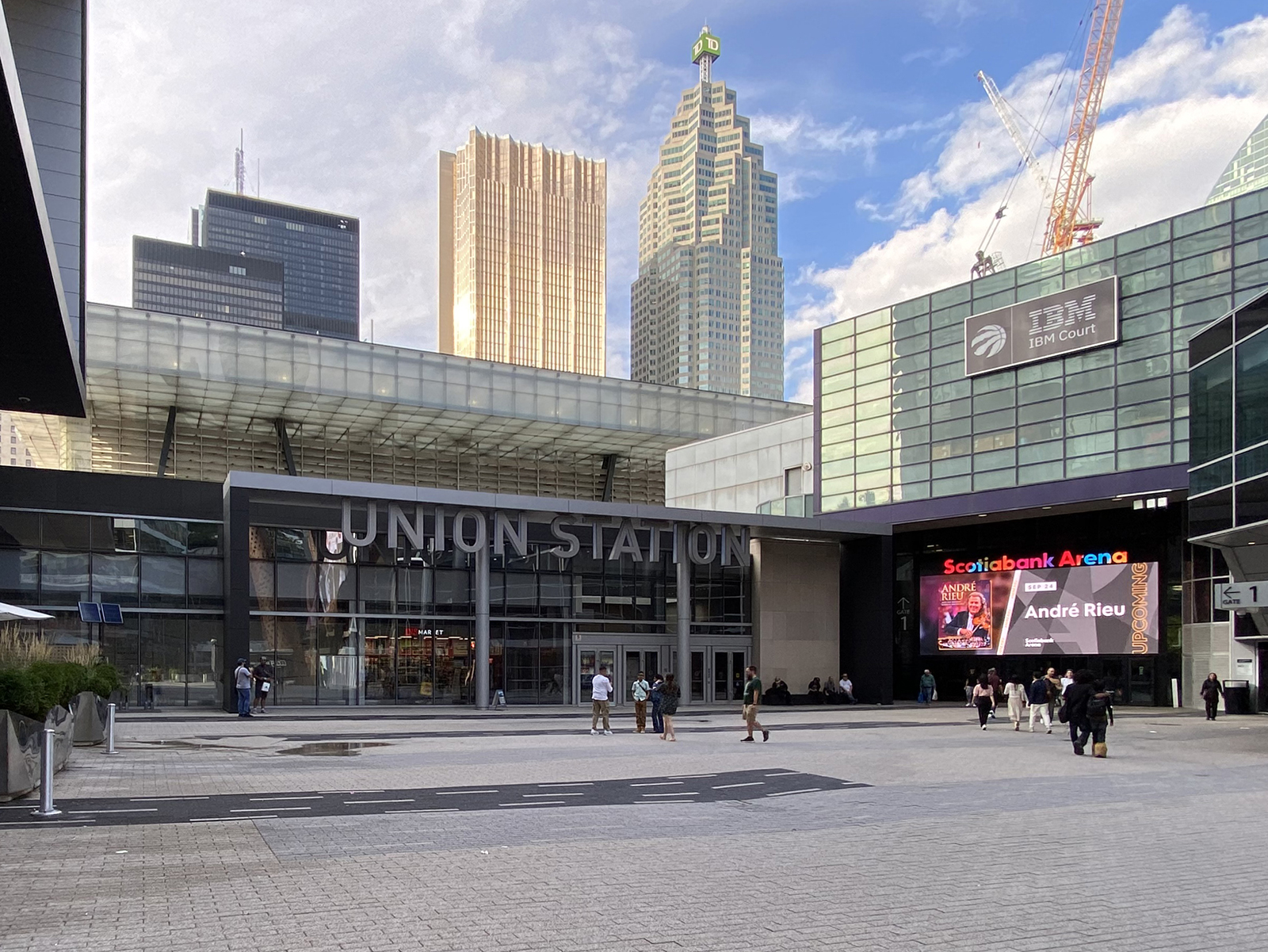
Union Station's southern entrance was opened in 2010.

In 2000, the City of Toronto purchased the station building from the TTR, while GO Transit purchased the railway corridor and the Union Station train shed. On July 24, 2003, the City of Toronto agreed to lease Union Station to Union Pearson AirLink Group, a subsidiary of SNC-Lavalin, for a term of 100 years.

A subsequent announcement on May 24, 2006, addressed several issues for commuters including: constructing a direct connection from the GO Concourse to the Path pedestrian tunnel system, a new eastbound platform for the Union TTC station, improved access to streetcars at Union TTC station, and improved capacity for inter-city railway passengers. These developments were part of a $100 million initiative announced by the city and its transit authorities, along with the Government of Ontario and Government of Canada. On August 5, 2009, the Toronto City Council approved an update of this plan which was projected to cost $640 million, with construction lasting from 2010 to 2014. Much of the work was undertaken by or managed by Carillion.

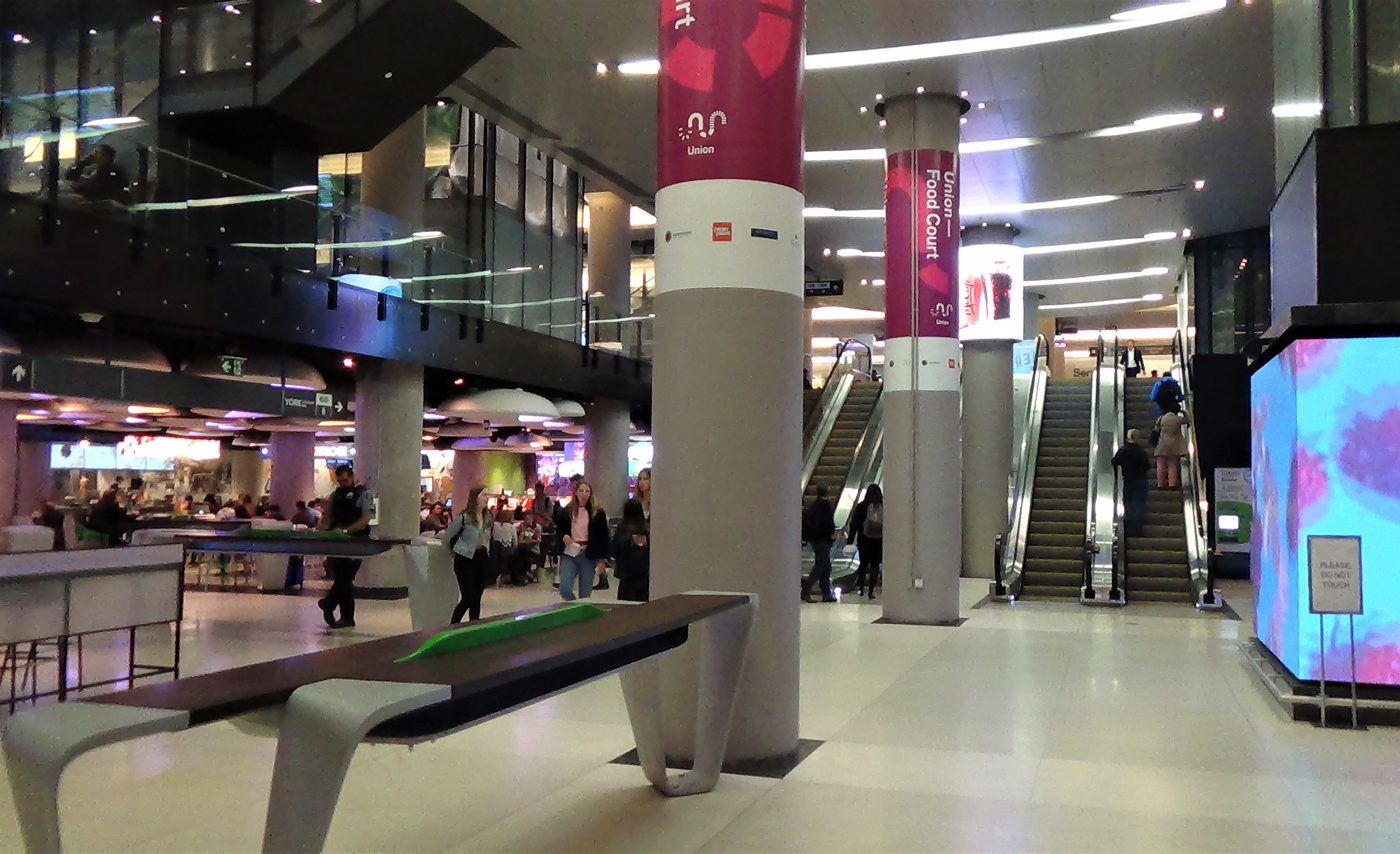
Union Food Court, the first phase of the lower retail level, was opened in January 2019.

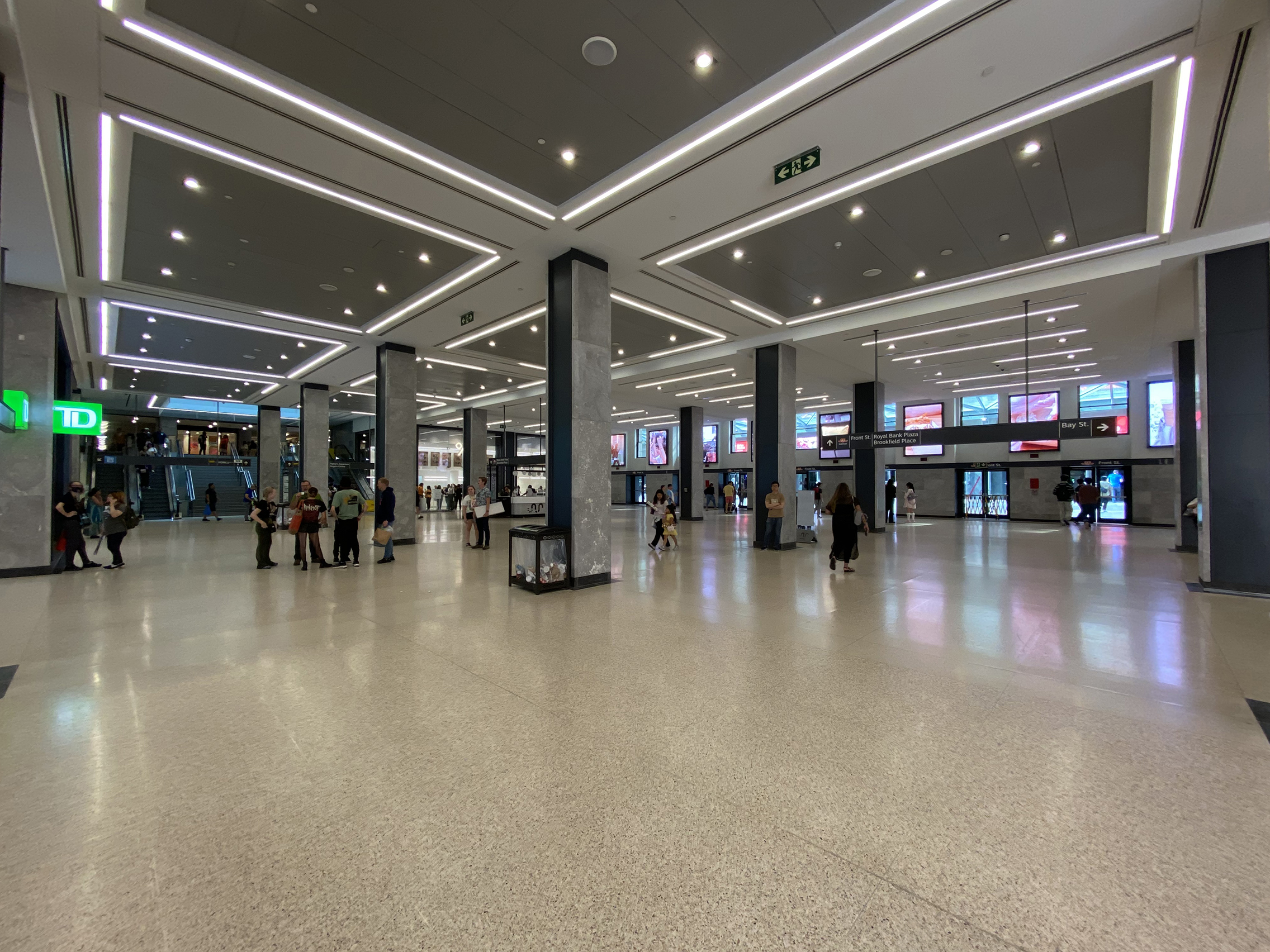
The new Bay Concourse (circa 2023) which opened in 2021

The work also involved a complete overhaul of the GO concourses, deepening them to create two storeys of space. The lower level (the food court section of which opened in January 2019) will provide retail space and room for pedestrian traffic flow, and the upper storey will be dedicated to passenger traffic onto the platforms. This will expand not only the current GO concourse in the east of the building, but also open up the western end; GO Transit's presence in the building will nearly quadruple. Additional aesthetic points include glass roofs over the moat space around the north sides of the building, and a tall atrium over the central portions of the platforms. A new southern entrance, adjacent to the Air Canada Centre, opened in 2010.

The 2009 Ontario and Canada government budgets included financing to assist GO, Via and the city in redeveloping and restoring the station. Track has been upgraded with better signals and snow cleaning devices to reduce winter delays to train movement.

In 2016, it was realized that the renovated train shed roof was too low to allow electrification. The train shed roof is considered a heritage feature and cannot be removed. Remedies considered were raising the roof, or lowering the track level.

By early 2018, the cost had increased from $640 million to an estimated $823.5 million. Work that was to have been completed in 2015 was projected to be finished late 2018 and in late 2018 revised to 2019. In 2019 it was announced that the city's portion of construction would be complete in 2019, but then Metrolinx would have to start its work, with a projected 2020 completion date.

In February 2019, charges were laid by Toronto Fire Services against contactor Bondfield Construction and the city for an over-crowding issue where doors had been blocked. In March 2019 it was reported that Vaughan-based contractor Bondfield Construction had applied for bankruptcy protection under the Companies' Creditors Arrangement Act (CCAA).

=== Heritage recognition ===
Union Station became designated as a National Historic Site of Canada in 1975, and a Heritage Railway Station in 1989. In 1999, Union Station was inducted into the North America Railway Hall of Fame as being significant in the course of railway history. The station is recognized as part of the Union Station Heritage Conservation District (Designated Part V) under the Ontario Heritage Act enacted by Toronto City Council on July 27, 2006.

== Passenger services ==
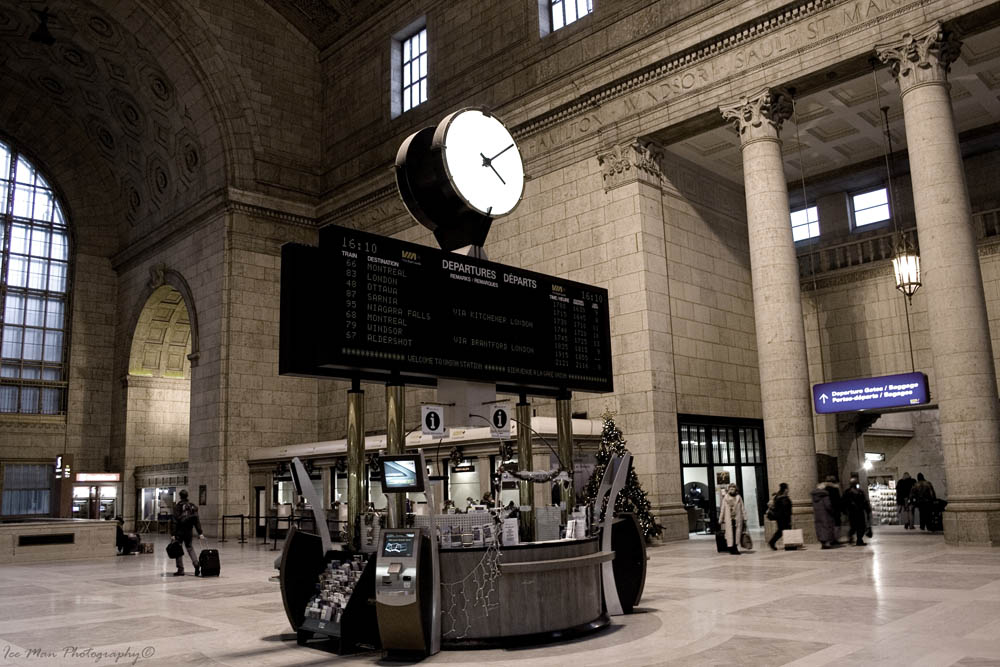
Timetable for inter-city rail services in the Great Hall

Union Station is the busiest public transportation structure of any kind in Canada, including air travel. It handles 65 million passengers annually, with an average of 200,000 passengers each day. Approximately two-thirds of those passengers are GO train or GO bus commuters, while another 20 million take the subway. The remainder are intercity travelers between other cities in Canada and the United States.

=== National ===
Toronto is Canada's primary passenger train hub. Consequently, Union Station is by far Via Rail's busiest and most-used station. Each year, 2.4 million Via Rail passengers pass through Union Station, representing more than half of all Via Rail passengers carried systemwide. This heavy usage is partly due to Union Station's position at the centre of Canada's busiest inter-city rail service area, the "Corridor", which stretches from Quebec City in the east to Windsor in the west.

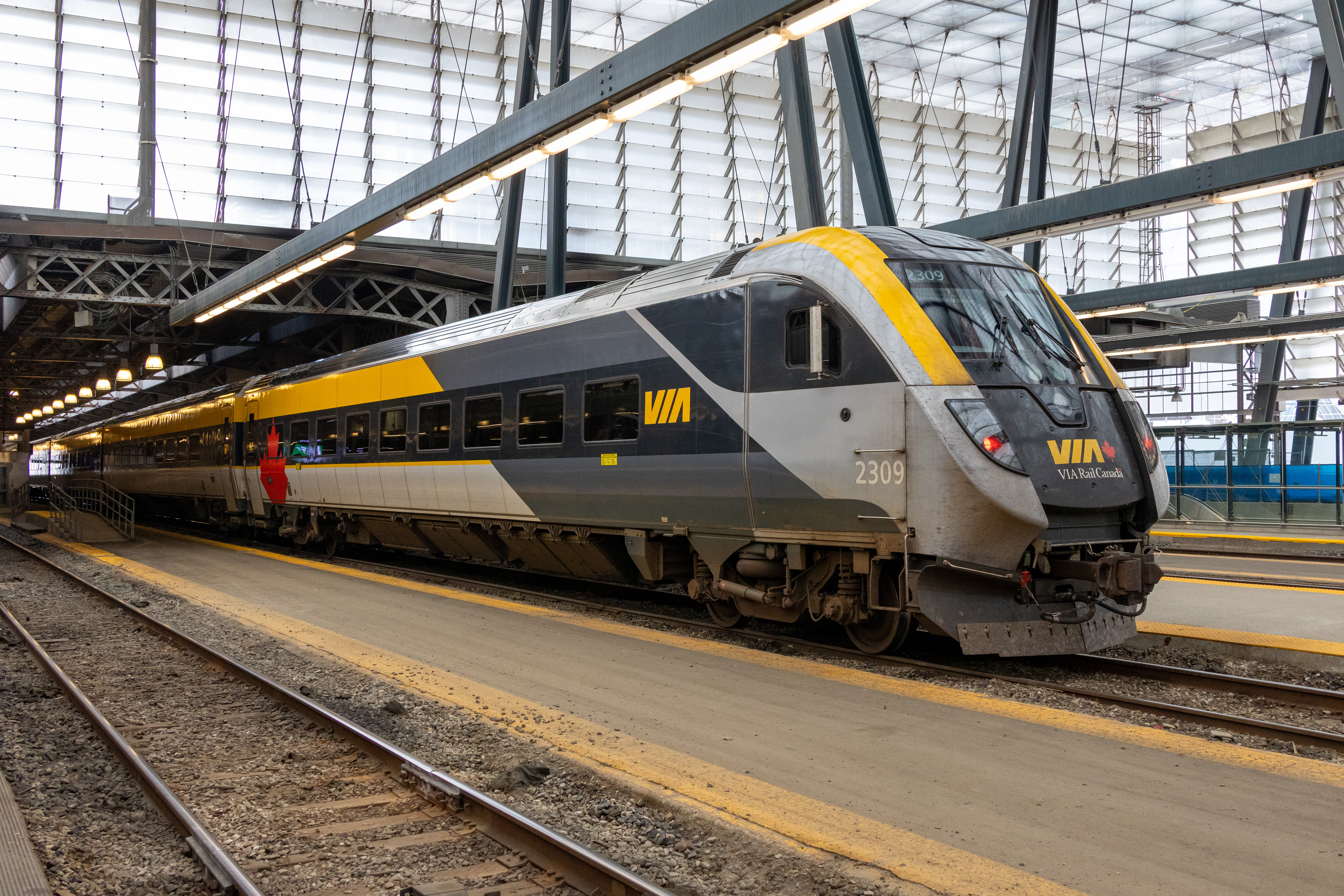
Via Rail train waiting in Union Station. The station is Via Rail's most used facility.

Westbound Via Rail trains from Toronto connect directly to most major cities in Southwestern Ontario, including Kitchener, London, Sarnia, and Windsor. Additionally, westbound trains from Montreal pass through Toronto en route to Burlington. Northbound and eastbound Via Rail trains from Toronto primarily serve the heavily travelled Ottawa–Montreal–Toronto triangle. At Montreal, passengers can connect to trains heading to the Maritimes or north to the Laurentians.

Union Station is also the eastern terminus of The Canadian, Via Rail's transcontinental service westbound to Vancouver via Winnipeg, Saskatoon and Edmonton.

=== International ===
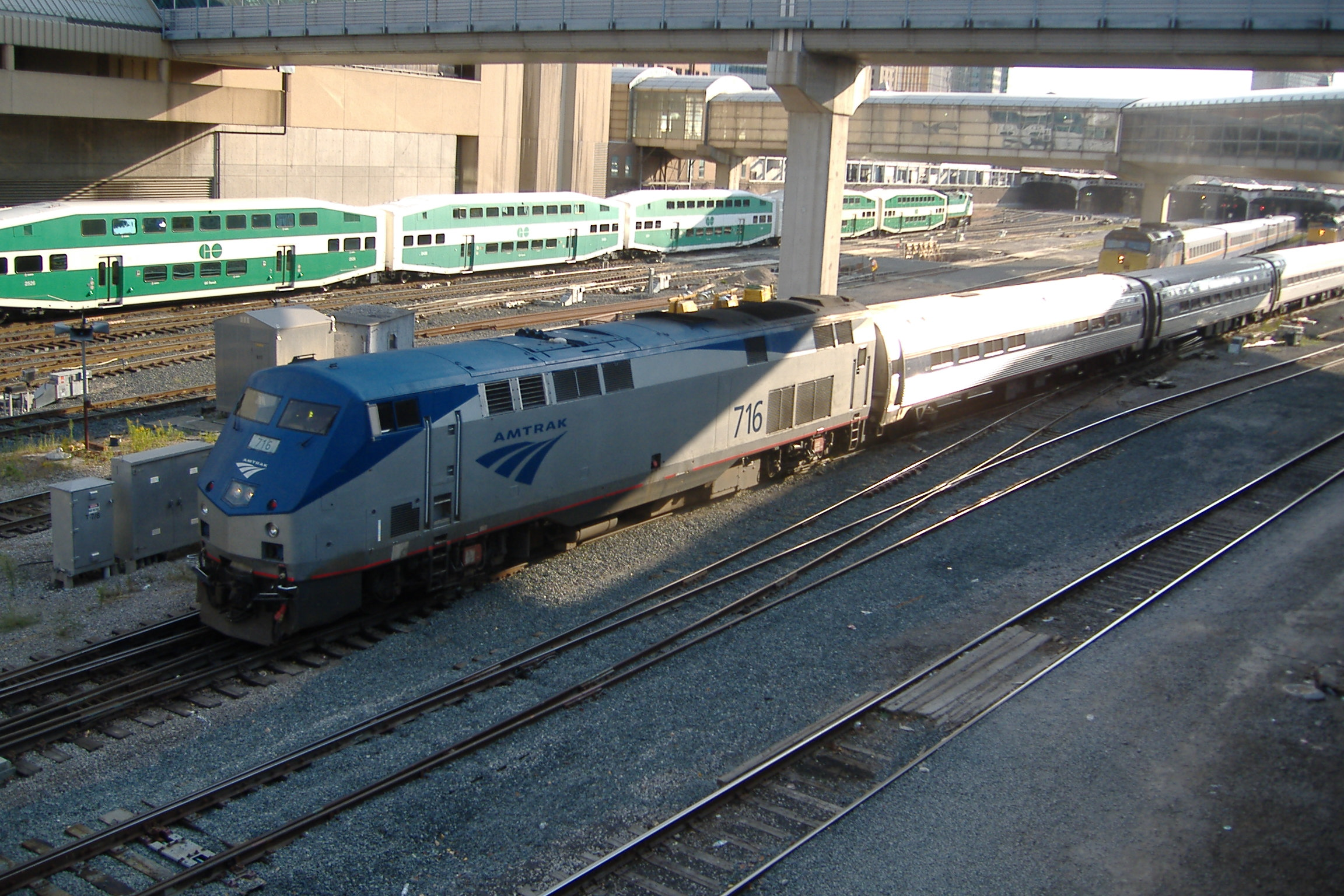
The Maple Leaf departing from Union Station to New York City

In partnership with Via Rail, Amtrak runs the Maple Leaf train from Toronto to New York City. The train uses an Amtrak consist but is operated by Via crews north of Niagara Falls, Ontario. Other major U.S. destinations along the route include Buffalo, Rochester, Syracuse and Albany.

Amtrak and Via Rail formerly operated the International Limited from Toronto to Chicago via the Sarnia–Port Huron border crossing, until it was cancelled in 2004. Both VIA Rail and Amtrak maintain service along the route on their respective sides of the border, but the trains do not cross the border.

=== Provincial and suburban ===
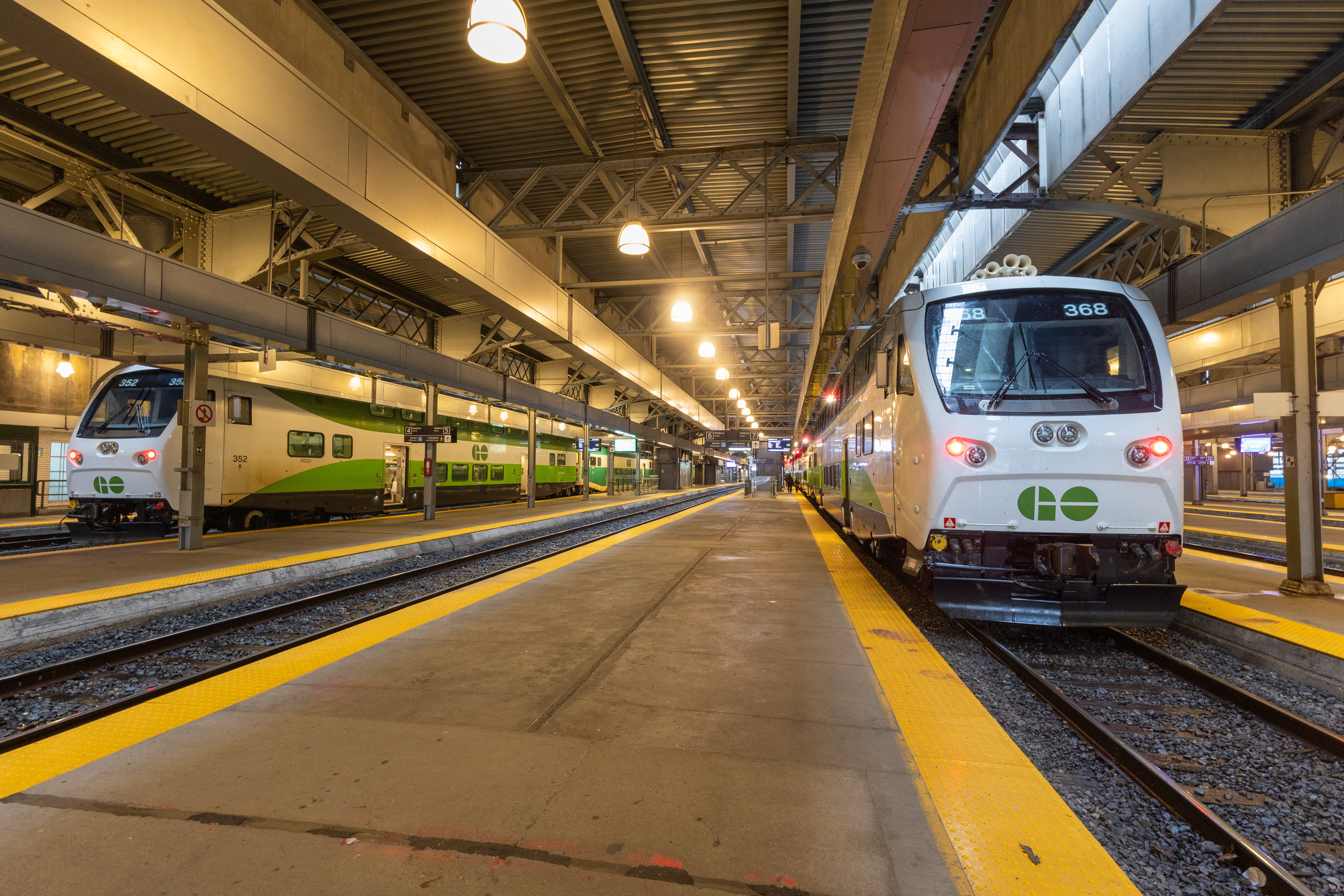
GO Transit trains in the train shed at Union Station

Union Station is the central terminal for GO Transit, which handled approximately 69.5 million passengers in 2015.

- The Barrie line to North York, Vaughan, King City, Aurora, Newmarket, East Gwillimbury, Bradford, and Barrie
- The Kitchener line to York, Etobicoke, Mississauga, Brampton, Georgetown, Acton, Guelph, Kitchener, and Stratford
- The Lakeshore East line to Scarborough, Pickering, Ajax, Whitby and Oshawa
- The Lakeshore West line to Etobicoke, Mississauga, Oakville, Burlington, Hamilton, St. Catharines and Niagara Falls
- The Milton line to Etobicoke, Mississauga and Milton
- The Richmond Hill line to North York and Richmond Hill
- The Stouffville line to Scarborough, Markham and Stouffville

GO Transit's Union Station Bus Terminal is located at CIBC Square, 81 Bay Street, on the south side of the terminal. The terminal currently serves GO Transit regional buses as well as Megabus, FlixBus, Ontario Northland and Greyhound Lines long-distance bus services.

=== Connecting services ===
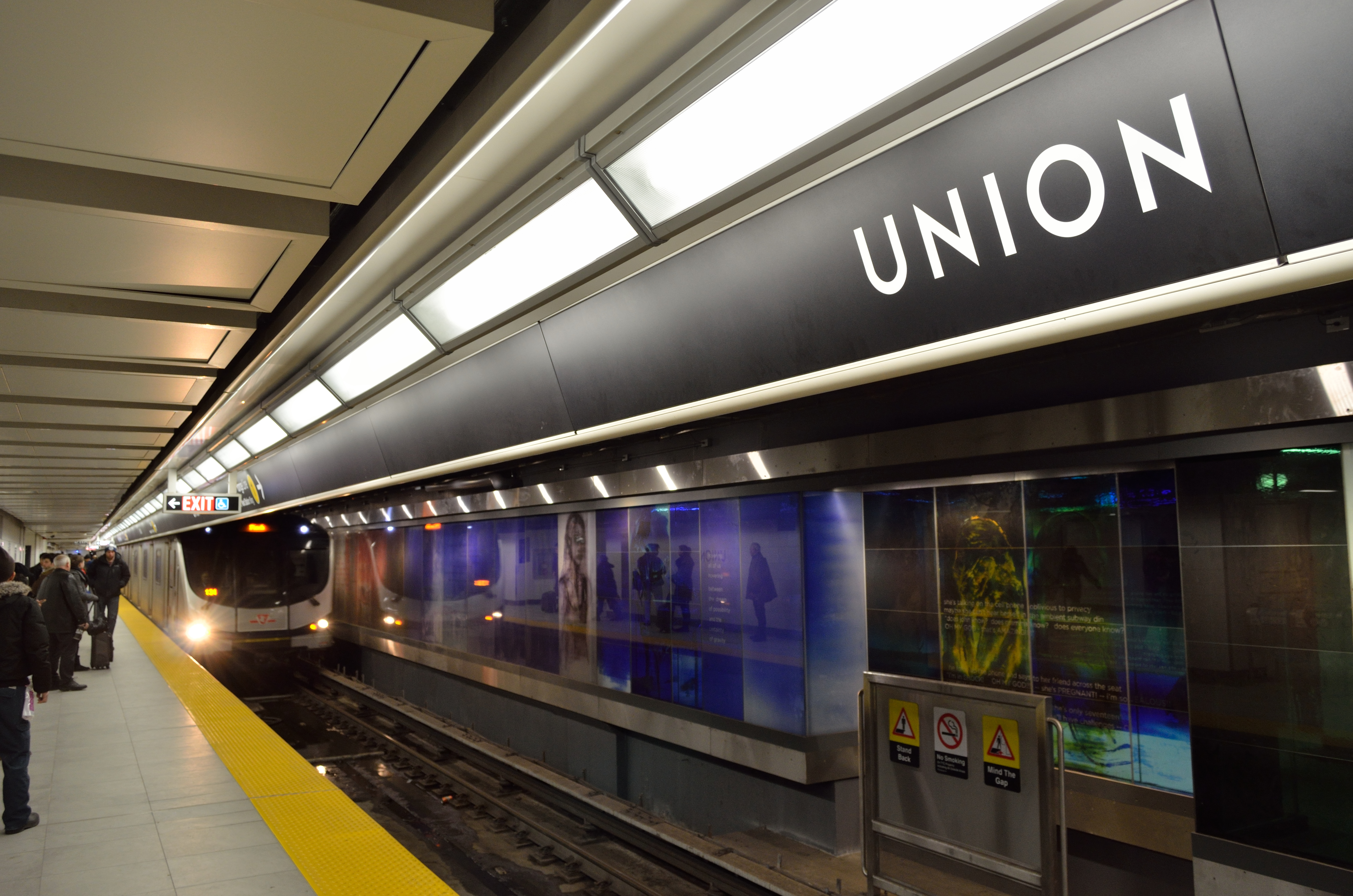
The station includes access to the Toronto subway system.

Union Station is connected to the Toronto Transit Commission's Union Subway Station, which is part of Line 1 Yonge–University of the Toronto subway system. Two Toronto streetcar routes, 509 Harbourfront and 510 Spadina, can also be accessed underground without leaving Union Station. The streetcar platform was built in 1989 and is separate from the subway station platforms built in 1954. Altogether, twenty million TTC passengers pass through Union Station each year. The TTC station was renovated and expanded in 2015, with an additional platform to increase capacity.

Toronto Transit Commission bus routes 19 Bay, 72 Pape, 97 Yonge, 121 Esplanade–River, and night route 320 Yonge, use curbside stops on the streets outside.

=== Airport link ===
On June 6, 2015, the Union Pearson Express (UP Express), a dedicated airport rail link service, started running between Union Station and Toronto Pearson International Airport, stopping only at Bloor and Weston GO stations. The opening of the line allowed Metrolinx to achieve its goal, announced in 2010, of operating an airport rail link from Union Station in time for the 2015 Pan American Games.

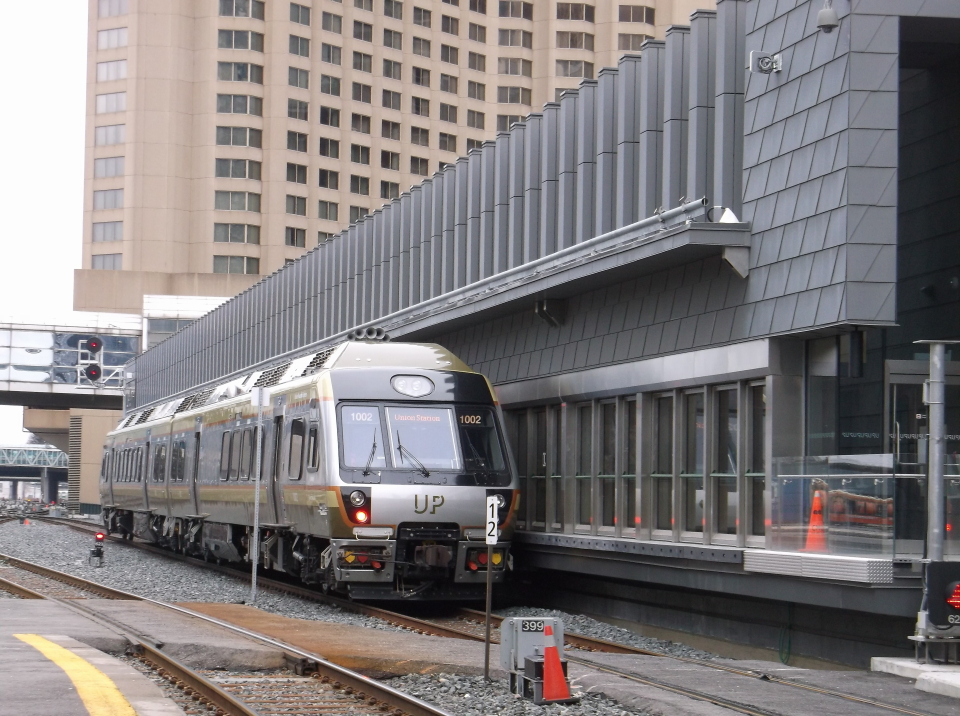
Union Pearson Express Union Station, located west of the main Union Station building

Trains on this line do not stop at the regular platforms used by GO and Via trains, but use a separate station located west of the main station building along the length of the main atrium of the SkyWalk between York Street and Lower Simcoe Street. The UP Express Union Station is a 5-minute walk from Union subway station.

Trains depart from the station's single side platform every 15 minutes. Passengers access trains directly from an enclosed waiting area, and a glass wall with sliding doors separate trains from the platform and open to allow passengers to board directly from the waiting area without exposure to the elements. The floor of the waiting area is level with the train floor, which allows for step-free boarding.

The UP Express Union Station has a dedicated customer service counter, ticket vending machines and flight check-in kiosks. These kiosks permit check-ins for Air Canada and WestJet. Three stands in the waiting area offer Balzac's coffee, souvenirs and Mill Street Brewery draft beer.

=== Former operations ===
==== Ontario Northland ====
- Northlander to Gravenhurst, Huntsville, North Bay, Cobalt and Cochrane

The Northlander provided a passenger train service between Union Station and Northeastern Ontario from 1976 until 2012. In March 2012, the Government of Ontario announced plans to discontinue this service, and the final day of operations was September 28, 2012.

==== Amtrak ====
- International to Port Huron, Flint, Battle Creek, Niles, and Chicago

The International (known until 1983 as the International Limited) provided a passenger train service between Union Station and Chicago Union Station from 1982 until 2004, when the cross-border service was discontinued and replaced by Via Rail's Toronto–Sarnia service, and Amtrak's Blue Water route from Port Huron to Chicago. The final day of operations was April 23, 2004.

== Other railway stations (terminals or depots) in Toronto ==
- Toronto, Grey and Bruce Railway Terminal – south of Fort York (now 24 Bathurst Street condo across from Housey Street)
- Grand Trunk Freight House – Front Street West and Simcoe Street (now Metro Toronto Convention Centre)
- Northern Railway Office – Spadina Avenue and Front Street West (late as The Globe and Mail head office and now being re-developed as The Well condo project
- Grand Trunk Passenger Terminal – Front Street East and Yonge Street (Freight Office after 1882, later as Toronto Wholesale Fruit Market from 1900 and Canadian Consolidated Rubber Company, shed destroyed by fire in 1952 and station finally demolished to make way for the O'Keefe Centre for the Performing Arts (now Meridian Hall)
- Toronto and Nipissing Railway Passenger, Freight and Maintenance Terminal, Berkeley Street – Front and Parliament, now Parliament Square Park
- Northern Railway Depot – Jarvis and The Esplanade at south end of old St Lawrence Market and now part of St Lawrence Market South wing

== Bibliography ==
- Riddell, John (1994). The Railways of Toronto, Volume Two.
- Toronto Union Station Master Plan
- CBC: Train station leased for 100 years
- Transport Canada Rail Link News Release
- Toronto's Union-Pearson Air-Rail Link
- Toronto Terminals Railway Company
- Underground exploration
