= Kingston Subdivision =

Rail line in Ontario and Quebec

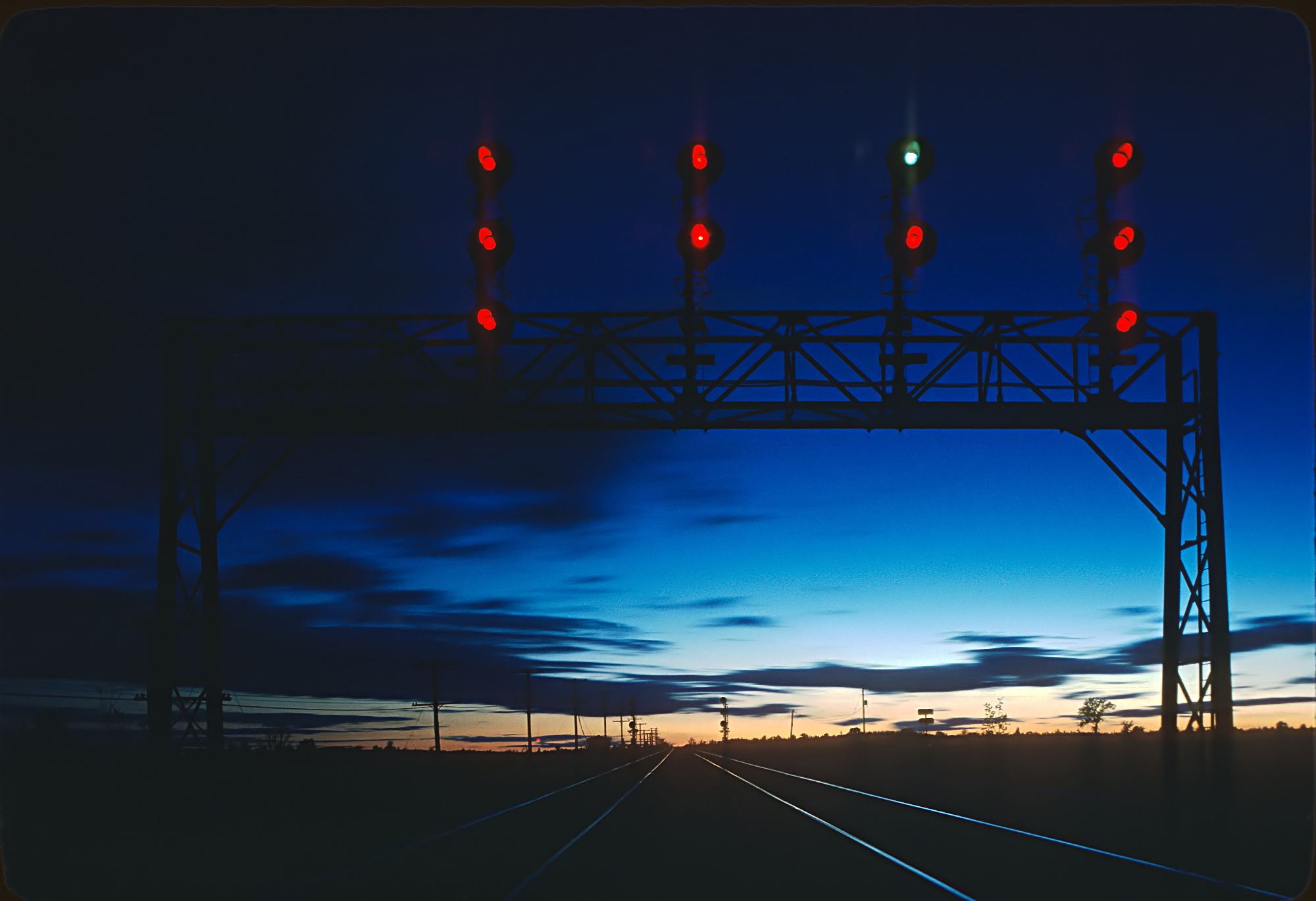
- CN on the Kingston Subdivision in October 1981

Overview
- Status: Operational
- Owner: Canadian National Railway; Metrolinx
- Locale: Ontario and Quebec, Canada
- Termini: Union Station Rail Corridor, Toronto; Montreal

Service
- Type: Heavy rail
- System: Canadian National Railway
- Services: Lakeshore East; Toronto-Montreal Corridor; Toronto-Ottawa Corridor
- Operator(s): Canadian National Railway (freight); GO Transit (passenger); Via Rail (passenger)

Technical
- Track gauge: 1,435 mm (4 ft 8 1/2 in) standard gauge
- Signalling: Centralized traffic control

The Kingston Subdivision (Kingston Sub for short) is a major railway line owned and operated by the Canadian National Railway (CN) in the Canadian provinces of Quebec and Ontario. It runs for approximately 300 miles (483 km) from Dorval (a suburb of Montreal) west to Pickering (a suburb of Toronto) and carries the vast majority of CN traffic between the two cities. The line runs along the northern shore of Lake Ontario and the Saint Lawrence River, largely over the rail alignment originally built for the Grand Trunk Railway in the 1850s.

The entire subdivision is double-tracked and contains over 50 interlocking crossovers; these crossovers are built longer in order to allow for high-speed track interchange - many permit trains to change tracks at up to 45 miles per hour. The entire subdivision is governed by Centralized traffic control (CTC). Since 1995, no OCS operation clearance forms need to be filled out by train conductors on the Kingston Subdivision. CTC signals thus provide both permission and authorization for train movements, as is the situation with most main line operation at CN.

Just east of Newcastle, roughly 29 miles (47 km) from Pickering, the line is joined by the CP Belleville Subdivision, Canadian Pacific Railway's parallel main line between Montreal and Toronto. The two remain nearly side-by-side to the east of Belleville, where the sub turns north to Smiths Falls. Some sections of the line are no longer owned by CN; in particular, the westernmost section of the line, between Pickering and Union Station in downtown Toronto, was sold to Metrolinx in March 2011 for GO Transit service as part of their Lakeshore East line. Following this sale, CN freight traffic entering Toronto from the east was redirected north of the city on the York Subdivision (which splits off in Pickering)..

Via Rail operates its Corridor services along the entirety of the line. Trains running to Ottawa turn north onto the Brockville Subdivision east of Brockville station, whereas trains to Montreal continue along the rest of the line.

== Route description ==
The Kingston Subdivision primarily runs along the north shore of Lake Ontario from Toronto's Union Station to Pickering Junction in western Pickering, where the Kingston Subdivision intersects the York Subdivision. The line is known as the "GO Kingston Sub". Between Union Station and Pickering Junction, the line is triple-tracked. Leaving Union Station's rail corridor, the line is intersected by the CN Bala Subdivision before curving slightly north through the southern end of Toronto's East York district. The first stop outside Union Station is Danforth, just off Danforth Road. GO Lakeshore East trains stop there, while Via trains do not. From there, the line passes Scarborough station, off Saint Clair Avenue, and just east of Scarborough the GO Stouffville line splits off. The Kingston Subdivision then passes Rouge Hill, Guildwood, and Eglinton stations before reaching Pickering Junction, where the GO tracks split and run parallel to the Kingston Subdivision. From Pickering Junction to Dorval, the line is known as the CN Kingston Subdivision.

Between Pickering Junction and Oshawa GO Station, where the Lakeshore East line ends, the Kingston Subdivision runs through the cities of Pickering, Ajax, Whitby, and Oshawa. However, the Kingston Subdivision has only one station, in Oshawa, served by Via; GO trains run on a parallel set of tracks and stop at Pickering, Ajax, and Whitby.

Between Oshawa GO Station and Darlington Provincial Park in western Bowmanville, the tracks run side by side with Highway 401. From Darlington Provincial Park, the line curves slightly, running just north of Darlington Nuclear Generating Station. From there, it curves north again between Bowmanville and Newcastle, and runs alongside Highway 401 again for a short time. From Newcastle, it winds between Lake Ontario and Highway 401 to Port Hope in western Northumberland County.

From there, the Kingston Subdivision runs through Cobourg, and between Cobourg and Belleville it runs parallel to-but slightly north of-Lake Ontario. East of Belleville and Hastings County, the line travels farther inland to Napanee. Just east of Napanee, the line once again parallels Lake Ontario, with a few final curves before Kingston.

From Kingston, the line passes north of Highway 401 through the communities of Lansdowne, Gananoque, and Mallorytown before passing under Highway 401 again into Brockville. Between Brockville and Cornwall, the Kingston Subdivision runs parallel to the Saint Lawrence River, passing through the communities of Prescott and Maitland before arriving in Cornwall. East of Cornwall, the line passes under Highway 401 once again, bringing it into the small town of Le Coteau. From there, the line remains alongside Quebec Autoroute 20 before ending in Dorval, just outside Montreal.

== Stations ==
The 1850s Grand Trunk Railway mainline consisted of 34 stations, many of which have been removed from service or no longer exist. Lansdowne station was torn down soon after CN abandoned service to the village in 1966; CN demolished an Iroquois station in 2002.

Stations currently on the Toronto-Montréal mainline include:

- Union Station (Toronto)
- GO Transit (no VIA service) at Danforth, Scarborough, Eglinton in Toronto
- Guildwood
- Commuter stations in Rouge Hill/Pickering, Ajax and Whitby serve GO Transit; No VIA service
- Oshawa GO Station
- Port Hope railway station
- Cobourg railway station
- Brighton (not in use, was part of Memory Junction railway museum)
- Trenton Junction railway station
- Belleville station (Ontario)
- Napanee railway station
- Ernestown (not in use)
- Kingston railway station (Ontario)
- Kingston Outer Station (abandoned, in ruins)
- Gananoque railway station
- Brockville railway station
- Prescott (not in use, now houses Grenville historical society and archives)
- Morrisburg (abandoned in 2020}
- Cornwall railway station
- Dorval railway station (Via)
- The line ended at Bonaventure Station, which has been replaced by Montreal Central Station.
