= Memory Junction Railway Museum =

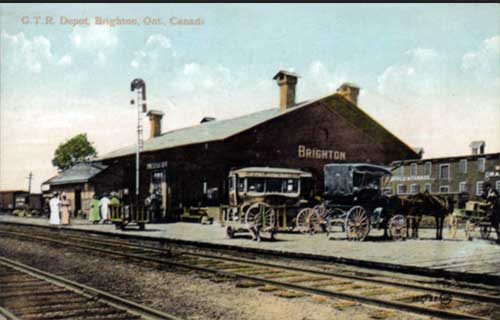
- Postcard showing the Brighton station, circa 1910.
- Established: 1857 (station); 1995 (museum)
- Location: 60 Maplewood Avenue, Brighton
- Coordinates: 44.036°N 77.743°W
- Type: defunct railway museum
- Key holdings: former railway station, locomotive and cars
- Collections: rail equipment and memorabilia
- Owners: Ralph and Eugenia Bangay

The Memory Junction Railway Museum preserved a collection of railway memorabilia in southeastern Ontario. It closed in 2017 and its collections were auctioned in 2021. It was located in the former Grand Trunk Railway station of Brighton, Ontario, which opened in 1857 and served intercity rail passengers until the 1960s.

== History ==
Brighton is on the Toronto-Montréal mainlines of both the Canadian National and Canadian Pacific Railway, which run side-by-side through the village. It once had a third railway, the Canadian Northern Railway, whose tracks occupied the Prince Edward County Railway right of way into Trenton, Ontario. At its peak, ten trains daily stopped at one or another of the three local passenger rail stations, all within a few blocks of one another.

Brighton's rail history dates to the October 27, 1856 opening of the Grand Trunk line from Montréal to Toronto. The current-day Maplewood Street was Railroad Street, agriculture was slowly displacing forestry as the primary local industry and communities long reliant on water transport were eagerly awaiting the rails as a means of access to larger markets.

In its heyday, the Brighton GTR station was a group of seven buildings and a stock yard; there was a freight shed, two private coal sheds, a 35 foot (11 m) wooden water tank and large piles of lumber (GTR's steam trains originally burned wood). The station itself is a "Type C" second-class wayside station, much like those still in rail service in Napanee and Port Hope; a single-story building with five door or window arches on the sides and two arches on each end. Most of these were built from limestone to a standard GTR design with a stone chimney on each of four corners; the Brighton station differs from the others in its use of brick. The original chimneys are now gone.

The railway allowed fruit to be canned in Brighton and transported to ocean ports for shipment overseas; it transported Brighton dairy products to market in Toronto and, in summer, brought thousands of passengers to Presqu'ile Provincial Park, which became an Ontario provincial park in 1922. At the time of the outbreak of the Great War in 1914, an era when there were only fifty motorcars in the village, a second railway came to town: the Canadian Pacific Railway. A fledgling third national railway, the Canadian Northern (CNoR), completed a line from Quebec to British Columbia in 1915.

CNoR was bankrupt by the end of the war, a third carrier in a saturated market, and was merged by the federal government into what is now Canadian National. CN built a short-lived CNoR Brighton station in 1920, only to abandon it after Grand Trunk's ill-fated attempt to expand westward left it bankrupt in 1922 and part of CNR by 1923. Much of the CNoR infrastructure was duplicative of CN's Grand Trunk line and was abandoned; passenger service moved to the original 1857 Brighton station and the 1920 CNoR station was eventually demolished.

The first efforts to pave the 1817-era stagecoach York Road as a Provincial Highway came near the end of the Great War; by 1964, most of that road, the main street of southeastern Ontario, had been bypassed by construction of a four-lane freeway, Ontario Highway 401. Rail passenger numbers had peaked near the time of World War II and were soon in freefall. Brighton's tiny 1857 passenger rail station was abandoned and boarded up a few years after the freeway came to town, sitting vacant through the 1970s and 1980s.

While much infrastructure had been removed, the original Brighton station building survived, serving as a museum until 2017. and was provincially designated on August 16, 2000 under Part 4 of the Ontario Heritage Act.

== Museum ==
In 1995, Ralph and Eugenia Bangay purchased the long-abandoned Brighton Station from CN for $400 as a place to store a growing collection of Brighton rail memorabilia. They restored the gentlemen's waiting room, express office and agent's room in the old brick station to house hundreds of artefacts, using the ladies' passenger waiting room as a souvenir shop.

A 1906 Grand Trunk 2-8-0 steam locomotive (#2534), relocated from Zwick's Park in nearby Belleville, occupies pride of place alongside two box cars (one from 1913), a flat car, three cabooses (including one from 1929) and an 1898 velocipede (a handcar used by repair workers to travel along the tracks). The Murrow Building, which served before 1920 as a distribution point for Ford motorcars destined for dealers from Bowmanville to Gananoque, houses additional memorabilia. The site also includes an 1880s Hops Barn and artefacts ranging from Coca-Cola once bottled in Brighton to Morse code equipment.

The busy CN and CP mainlines still run side-by-side beside the museum, but the countless Via Rail trains carrying passengers from Montreal and Ottawa to Toronto do not stop.

In 2017 the museum closed and in 2021 the contents were put up for auction.

== See also ==
=== Stations ===
Of an estimated 32-34 Grand Trunk wayside stations built when the line opened, a half-dozen originals remain on the Montréal-Toronto 1856 Grand Trunk mainline:

- Napanee railway station and Port Hope railway station are restored and remain in passenger service.
- Belleville, Ontario railway station served until 2012 (when a new station was built adjacent) and now houses offices.
- Prescott, Ontario's station now houses the local historical society office; the train does not stop.
- Ernestown, Ontario's station is boarded up and abandoned.
- Brighton's station is Memory Junction.

Little remains of the Kingston, Ontario outer station ruins but the exterior limestone shell. Two original stations on the Toronto-Sarnia line still stand, of which one (the Georgetown GO station) remains in passenger use.

=== Museums ===
One museum remains on the former CNoR line from Toronto-Brighton-Napanee-Smiths Falls; the abandoned Smiths Falls station is now the Railway Museum of Eastern Ontario. The rail line through Sydenham was removed in the 1980s.

Preceding station	Canadian National Railway	Following station
Colborne toward Sarnia	Grand Trunk Railway; Main Line	Smithfield toward Montreal
