= Guelph Bus Terminal =

Bus station in Guelph, Ontario, Canada

Guelph
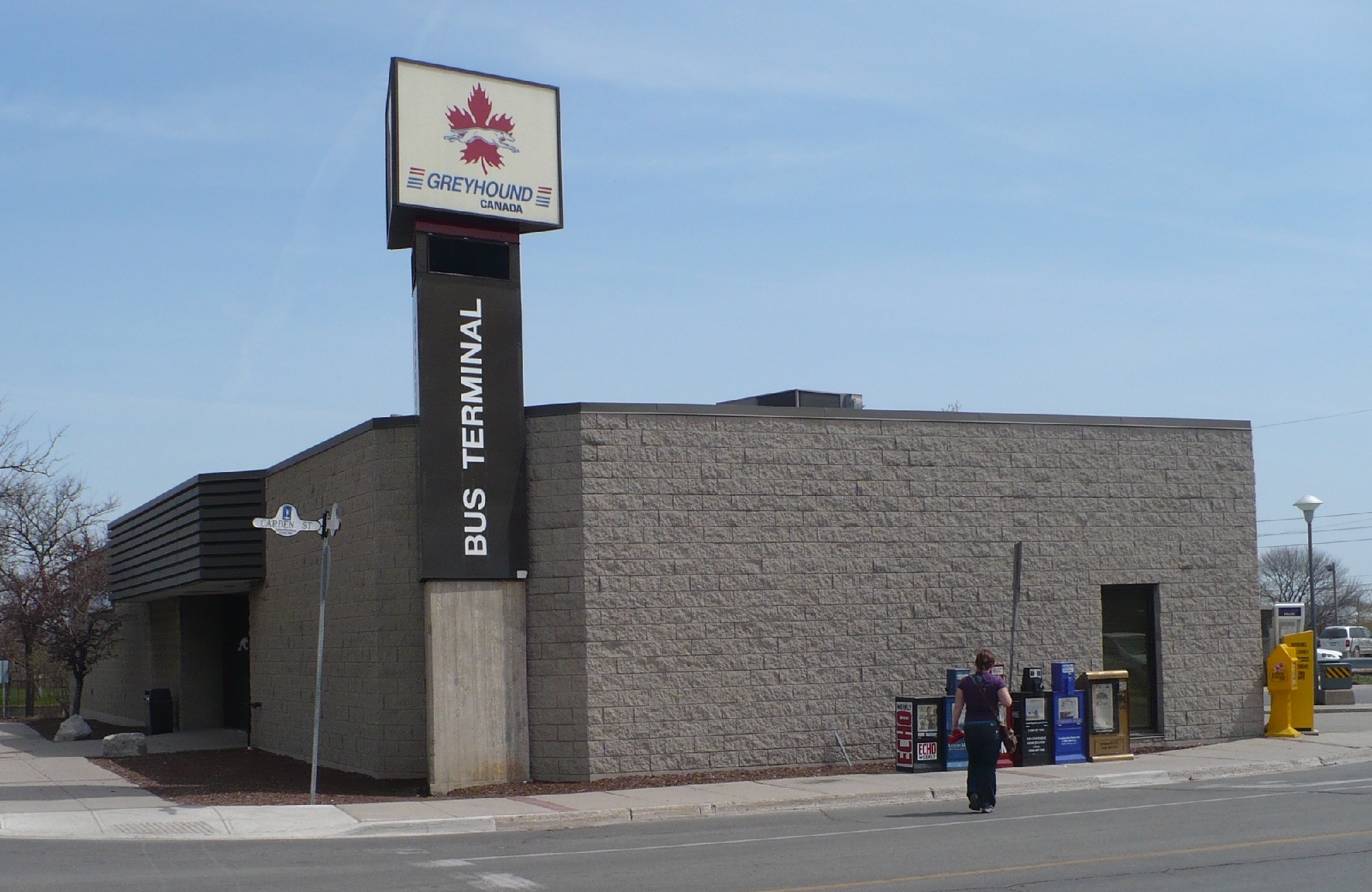
- Original terminal building, as seen in 2008

General information
- Location: 17 Wyndham St South; Guelph, Ontario
- Coordinates: 43°32′44.8″N 80°14′43.8″W
- System: Bus Terminal

History
- Closed: May 13, 2012
Location

The Guelph Bus Terminal was the main intercity bus station in Guelph, Ontario until May 13, 2012, when it was replaced by Guelph Central Station.

Operators using the terminal included Aboutown, GO Transit and Greyhound. Coach Canada also served the station until early 2010.

Guelph Transit local bus services stopped nearby at St. George's Square.

The original terminal at 141 MacDonell Street was torn down in 2011 to make way for Guelph Central Station, which would consolidate intercity bus, local bus and railway services into one location. A temporary intercity bus terminal was provided at 17 Wyndham St South during the construction period.

== Former Services ==
=== GO Transit ===
- Georgetown for GO Train connections and York Mills GO Bus. GO Stop located across from bus terminal on way into Guelph Central Station.

=== Greyhound ===
- Toronto Quicklink
- Kitchener / London (local service)

=== Abouttown ===
- Daily service to Hamilton and limited service to Owen Sound.

=== Guelph Transit ===
Guelph Transit north of the temporary bus terminal.

== University of Guelph ==
The University of Guelph has created a transit hub within the entrance mall area in front of the University Centre to accommodate increased GO Bus service. Guelph Transit, Aboutown Northlink and Greyhound Canada also added more bus services to campus.

- Cooksville via Aberfoyle park & ride and Square One (GO Bus route 29)
- York University via Aberfoyle park & ride, Meadowvale and Bramalea (GO Bus route 48)
- There are several Guelph Transit bus routes that service the University.

== Intermodal Transportation Centre ==
The former Guelph Bus Terminal at 141 MacDonell Street was closed and torn down in the summer of 2011 to make way for the new Guelph Central Station intermodal transportation centre. Greyhound and GO Transit buses were temporarily relocated to the corner of Fountain St. and Wyndham St. S. across from the Guelph Police Station.

The temporary bus terminal was closed on May 13, 2012 and was integrated into the new transportation centre which includes Guelph railway station and former bus terminal site. The railway station was renovated to accommodate ticket sales for both bus and train users.
