= Napanee station =

Railway station in Ontario, Canada

Napanee
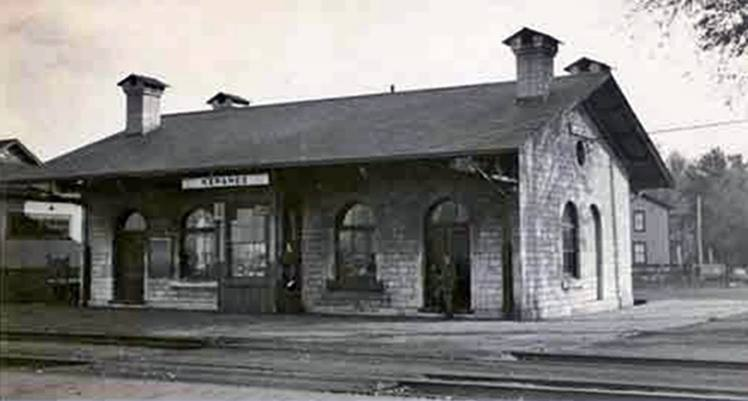
- Napanee station building in the early 1900s

General information
- Location: 301 John Street; Napanee, Ontario; Canada
- Coordinates: 44°15′13.3″N 76°57′15.5″W
- Platforms: 1 side platform
- Tracks: 2

Construction
- Structure type: Shelter
- Parking: Yes
- Accessible: yes

Other information
- Website: Napanee train station

Services
Preceding station	Via Rail	Following station
Belleville toward Toronto	Toronto–Ottawa	Kingston toward Ottawa
Former services
Preceding station	Canadian National Railway	Following station
Marysville toward Sarnia	Grand Trunk Railway; Main Line	Fredericksburg toward Montreal
Terminus	Napanee – Ottawa	Strathcona, Ontario toward Ottawa
Location
- Location within Ontario Location within Canada Location within North America

Napanee station in Napanee, Ontario, Canada is served by Via Rail trains running from Toronto to Ottawa. The 1856 limestone railway station was an unstaffed but heated shelter with telephones and washrooms, which would open at least half an hour before a train arrives. The platform is wheelchair-accessible. As of February 2023, the shelter was locked.

Napanee station is one of originally 34 first generation Grand Trunk Railway stations in Ontario from the same era as the opening of the line. Nine still exist, of which three remain in active service. The station building is owned and maintained by the municipality.

== History ==
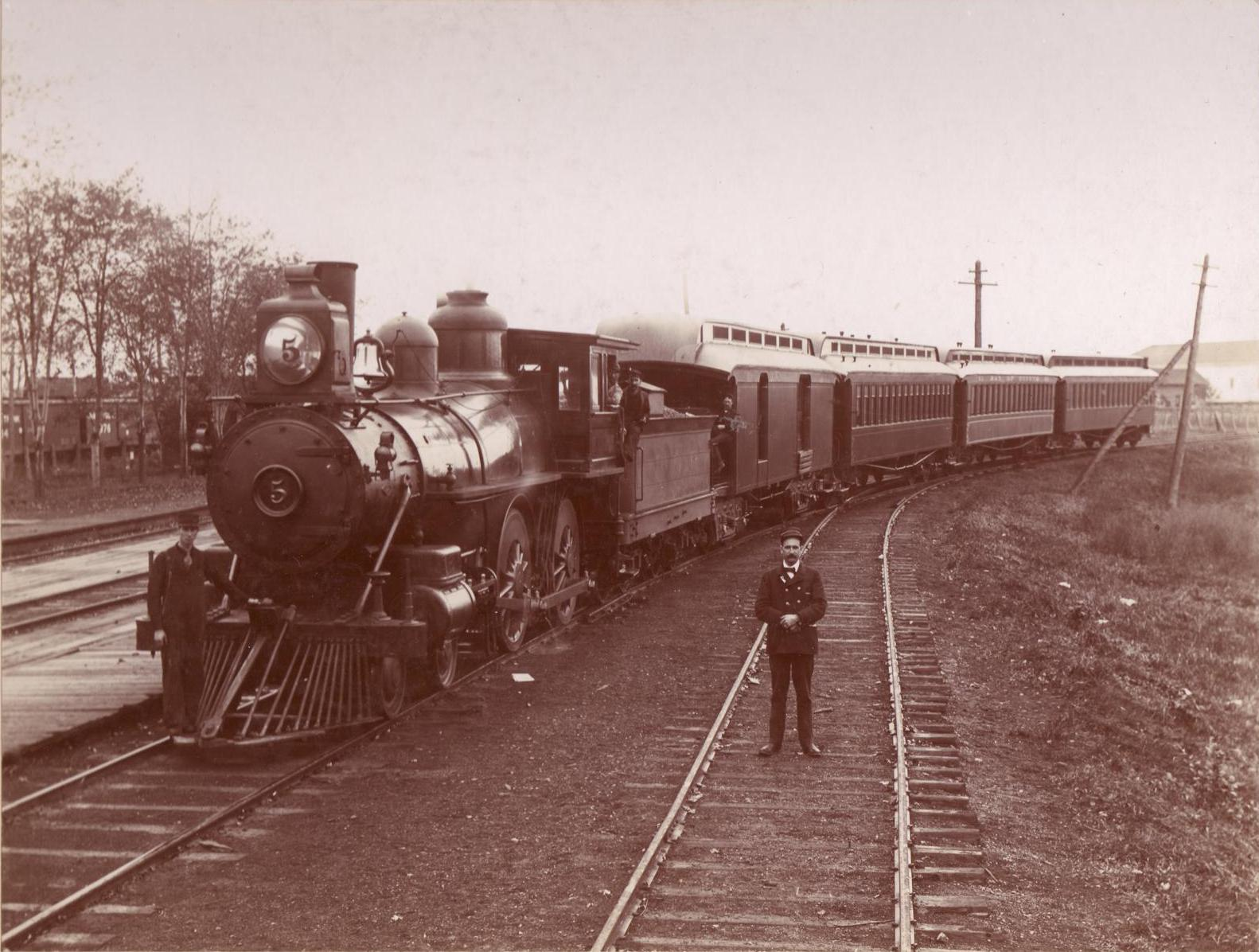
Bay of Quinte Railway Engine #5 and its crew, about to leave Napanee for Deseronto, circa 1900 - 1903.

The original Grand Trunk stations were stone buildings constructed during or immediately after the 1856 opening of the GTR (now CN) mainline between Montréal and Toronto. Nine survive today, including a pair at Napanee and Ernestown in Lennox and Addington County which were built from Kingston Limestone using similar design. The first generation "Type C" Grand Trunk stations (small stations in Napanee, Ernestown, Brighton) were stone rectangular buildings with four chimneys and five bays for arched windows on the long side and two on each end, under a pitched slate roof with elongated eaves and soffits supported by end rafters and triangular brackets.

At the time of the railway's construction, Bath, Ontario was a bustling lakefront manufacturing village with 400-1000 people. The rails led to a shift in population from Bath (which was not on the GTR mainline) to Napanee (well served by the York Road, Napanee River and Grand Trunk Railway). The railway also led to a shift in population away from small towns to larger centres such as Belleville and Kingston.

At one point, Napanee was served by two railways; the Grand Trunk (Montréal-Toronto) and the Bay of Quinte Railway (Deseronto-Sydenham). The BQR was integrated into Canadian Northern Railway's mainline to Smiths Falls in 1910 and became part of CN when the Canadian Northern went bankrupt in 1918. The former Canadian Northern line through Napanee was managed as the CN Smiths Falls Subdivision (heading north through Smiths Falls to Federal) and the CN Deseronto Subdivision (heading south to Deseronto and Brighton). Much of the Deseronto Subdivision was abandoned in the 1930s, with the last section between Deseronto and Napanee being abandoned around 1986. North of Napanee, parts of the line were abandoned starting in the early 1990s. The last fragment of this line was disconnected in 2010 at Napanee's historic Grand Trunk station; it crossed Hwy 401 to a Goodyear Tire and Rubber factory as a dead end after the rails to Smiths Falls were removed in the 1980s. The section from Strathcona to Smiths Falls is now the Cataraqui Trail.

Napanee's station is now municipally owned and remains in active use. The train no longer stops at Ernestown, leaving a boarded-up but intact CN-owned station in a rural area at an inaccessible point on the CN mainline 500 metres (1,600 ft) west of Camden East Road. The other seven stations from this original set are CN-owned and in varying condition. Trains no longer stop at St. Marys Junction, Brighton and Prescott. Kingston's historic outer station, in use until 1974, is now abandoned and in ruins. Belleville's original station is intact but largely vacant as a new facility was built adjacent in 2012. The original Port Hope (1856) and Georgetown (1858) stations remain in active service.

With the exception of the removal of stone chimneys on the four corners, the exterior currently looks much as it did originally. The 1856 Napanee Station was provincially designated Feb 26, 1993 under Part 4 of the Ontario Heritage Act; Brighton Station obtained a similar designation in 2000. The other seven original stations are designated federally under the Heritage Railway Stations Protection Act, a status which does not apply to the municipally owned Napanee station as the railway no longer directly owns the building.

== Services ==
Napanee station is only served by local trains on Via Rail's Toronto–Ottawa route. Most Toronto–Ottawa trains and all Toronto-Montreal trains pass through the station without stopping.

As of October 2023 the station is served by one train per day toward Toronto, and two to three trains per day toward Ottawa.
