= Gananoque River Bridge =

- Coordinates: 44.3595817°N 76.1900058°W
- Carries: CN Rail Kingston subdivision
- Crosses: Gananoque River
- Locale: United Counties of Leeds and Grenville, Ontario, Canada
- Owner: CN Rail

Characteristics
- No. of spans: 4

History
- Opened: 1903

Location
- Interactive map of Gananoque River Bridge

The Gananoque River Bridge is a railway bridge across the Gananoque River in the municipality of Leeds and the Thousand Islands, United Counties of Leeds and Grenville in eastern Ontario, Canada, located between Montreal and Toronto at mile 155.9 in the Canadian National Railway Kingston subdivision. It consists of four identical spans carrying single track supported on common piers and abutments and was built in 1902–1903 according to Grand Trunk Railroad specifications of 1900. The bridge carries all CN freight traffic between Toronto and Montreal, and all Via Rail Corridor passenger rail traffic between Toronto and Ottawa/Montreal.

== Technical details ==
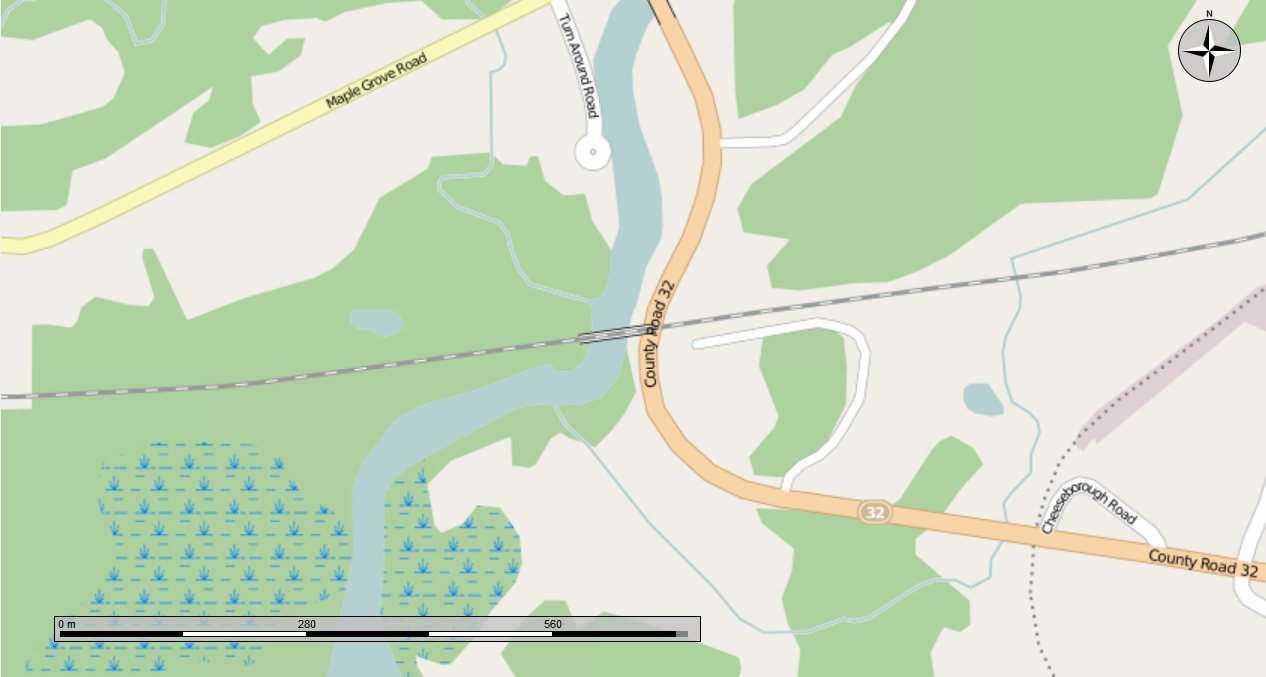
Map showing the bridge.

Each span has a total length of 20.091 metres (65 ft 11 in) and is composed of two plate girders with a depth of 1.69 metres (5 ft 7 in) each with a 2.134-metre (7 ft) spacing. The entire bridge structure is riveted with 22.2 mm (0.875 in.) rivets. The bridge is made of an open hearth-type steel which closely resembles today's mild steel (ASTM A36 steel).

A single railway track is located symmetrically on top of the girder flanges. The 132-pound (60 kg) type rails are supported by 250-by-250-millimetre (9.8 in × 9.8 in) timber railway ties in section with a 356-millimetre (14 in) spacing.

A 1991 engineering study showed "no major structural deficiency of the bridge superstructure in terms of excessive stresses or deflections under normal traffic conditions". Tests indicated that the static strength of the bridge is sufficient to allow trains running at speeds not exceeding 96 km/h (60 mph).

== Rehabilitation ==
The United Counties of Leeds and Grenville Council has sought to rehabilitate the bridge. In January 2013, the council estimated the total cost of the bridge rehabilitation at $ 1.2 million.
