= Guelph Central Station =

Railway station in Ontario, Canada

Guelph Central
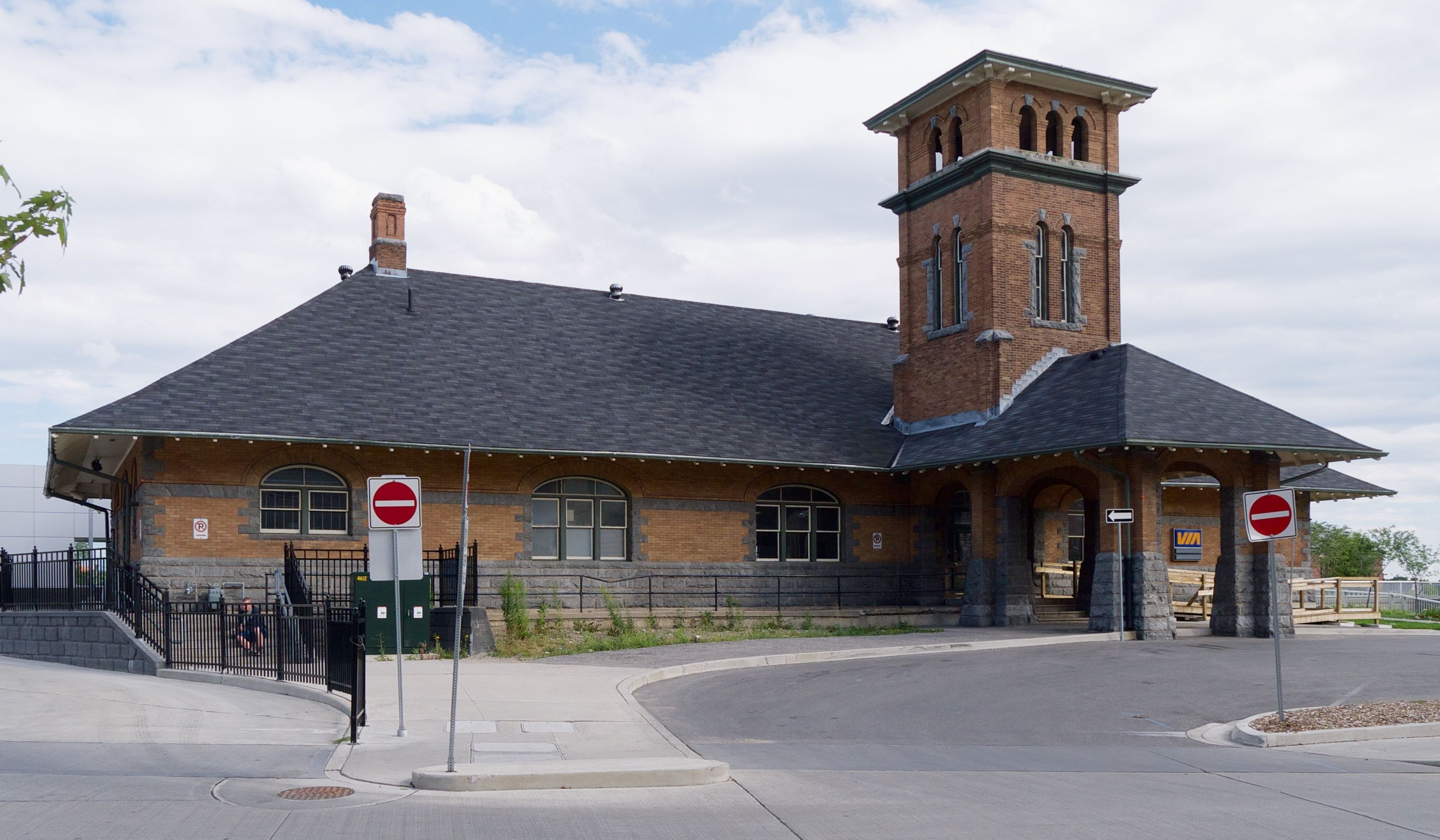
- The heritage Grand Trunk Railway building

General information
- Location: 79 Carden Street; Guelph, Ontario; Canada
- Coordinates: 43°32′39″N 80°14′49″W
- Owner: City of Guelph
- Platforms: 1 side platform
- Tracks: 1
- Bus routes: 17 29 31 33 48
- Bus stands: 22
- Connections: Guelph Transit; Guelph Owen Sound Transit

Construction
- Structure type: Unstaffed station
- Parking: No
- Accessible: yes

Other information
- Station code: GO Transit: GL; IATA: XIA
- Fare zone: 39

History
- Opened: 1911; 115 years ago
- Rebuilt: May 13, 2012; 14 years ago

Services
Preceding station	Via Rail	Following station
Kitchener toward Sarnia	Sarnia–Toronto	Georgetown toward Toronto
Preceding station	GO Transit	Following station
Kitchener towards Stratford	Kitchener	Acton towards Union
Former services
Preceding station	Amtrak	Following station
Kitchener toward Chicago	International	Georgetown toward Toronto
Preceding station	Canadian National Railway	Following station
Mosborough toward Sarnia	Sarnia – Toronto via Lucan Crossing	Rockwood toward Toronto
Marden toward Owen Sound	Owen Sound – Hamilton	Guelph Junction toward Hamilton
Future services
Preceding station	Via Rail	Following station
Kitchener Central Opening 2029 toward Sarnia	Sarnia–Toronto	Georgetown toward Toronto
Preceding station	GO Transit	Following station
Kitchener Central Opening 2029 towards Stratford	Kitchener	Acton towards Union
Breslau TBD towards Stratford	Kitchener	Acton towards Union

Heritage Railway Station (Canada)
- Designated: 1992
- Reference no.: 4569
Location

Guelph Central Station (also known as Guelph Central GO Station) is the main inter-modal transportation terminal in Guelph, Ontario, Canada. It is used by Via Rail and GO Transit trains, as well as Guelph Transit local buses, GO Transit regional buses and intercity buses. It is located at 79 Carden Street and includes the historic Guelph Railway Station, as well as the site of the former Guelph Bus Terminal.

== History ==
=== GTR station ===
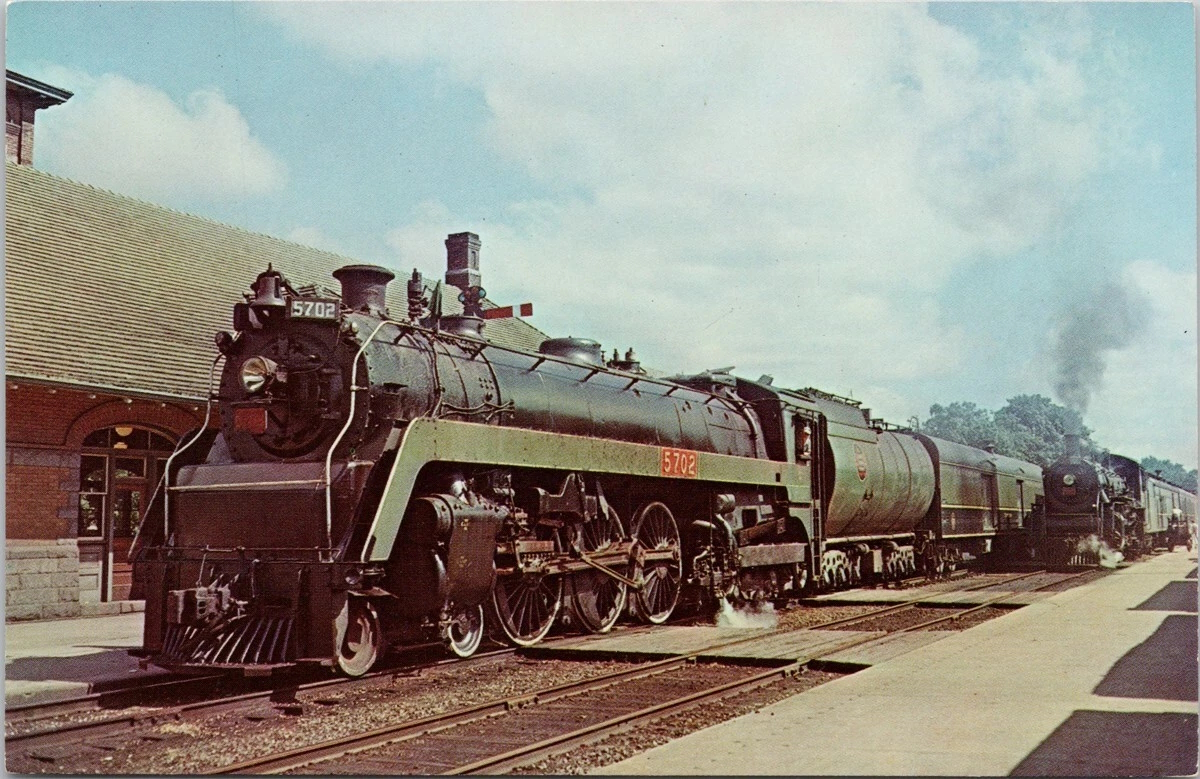
Canadian National No. 5702 at the station with a passenger train in July 1957

The current station building was built in 1911 by the Grand Trunk Railway, which had been serving Guelph since 1856. In addition to serving regional trains, in the pre-Amtrak era, it served the Grand Trunk Western's Maple Leaf (Chicago - Toronto). The station is a classic example of early 20th century Canadian railway station design and has been designated as a heritage structure per the Heritage Railway Stations Protection Act. The Romanesque Revival building, with an Italianate tower, has been listed on the Canadian Register since 2006 and was formally recognized as one of Canada's Historic Places in November 1992.

In 1923, the Grand Trunk Railway was merged into the Canadian National Railway.

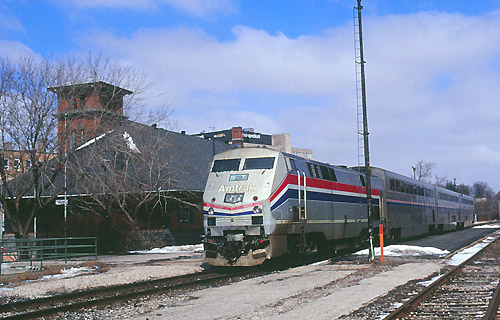
The International at Guelph in 2004

Between 1982 and 2004, the Central station was served by the International Limited, a train service between Chicago and Toronto that was then operated jointly by Via Rail and Amtrak.

Guelph was also served by GO Transit trains between 1990 and 1993, when it served as the terminus of the then Georgetown line. Provincial cutbacks in 1993 caused GO Transit to cut back service to Georgetown.

The current GO Train service through Guelph Station began on December 19, 2011, when two daily trains in each direction on the then Georgetown line were extended to Kitchener.

=== Intermodal Terminal ===
The Intermodal Transit Terminal was first proposed in 2002 to consolidate intercity bus, local bus and railway services into one facility. At the time, the downtown terminal for Guelph Transit was three blocks away at St. George's Square. A feasibility study was initiated in 2004, and Guelph City Council endorsed the Carden Street location and the concept design that same year. The project received federal and provincial infrastructure stimulus funding in 2009, and detailed design and stakeholder consultations were conducted. Construction began in April 2010.

The name "Guelph Central" was chosen with input from the community and the transit service providers using the new station.

The station opened to the public on May 13, 2012. The project was projected to cost $8 million, of which $5.3 million was from the Provincial and Federal Infrastructure Stimulus Funds.

The opening of the bus portion of the station was delayed from October 2011 to May 2012 to allow time for the renovations of the railway station building to be completed.

Additional renovations, with a $2.1 million budget, were completed in 2016–2017. The work also helped to preserve and restore heritage characteristics.

== Services ==
=== Guelph Transit ===
On January 1, 2012, all the Guelph Transit routes were changed. While it was originally planned to have the new bus routes meeting at the new station on the same date, this change was delayed until May 6, 2012. In September 2016, Guelph Transit began offering early morning shuttle service for those connecting with early GO Trains. The PRESTO co-fare cards can be used through all of the hours of GO service in Guelph.

=== Via Rail ===
Via Rail operates one daily train in each direction on the Sarnia - London - Toronto line.

=== GO Transit ===
- GO Train service on the Kitchener line to Toronto Union Station.
- Bus service to York Mills Bus Terminal & Union Station Bus Terminal (GO Bus routes 31 and 33).
- Bus service to Square One via Aberfoyle park & ride, Milton Carpool Lot, Winston Churchill Station and Erin Mills Station (GO Bus route 29)

=== Guelph Owen Sound Transportation ===
Starting August 31, 2020, the GOST (Guelph Owen Sound Transportation) operates a bus service between Guelph Central Station and Owen Sound Transit Terminal twice a day.

== Bus platforms ==
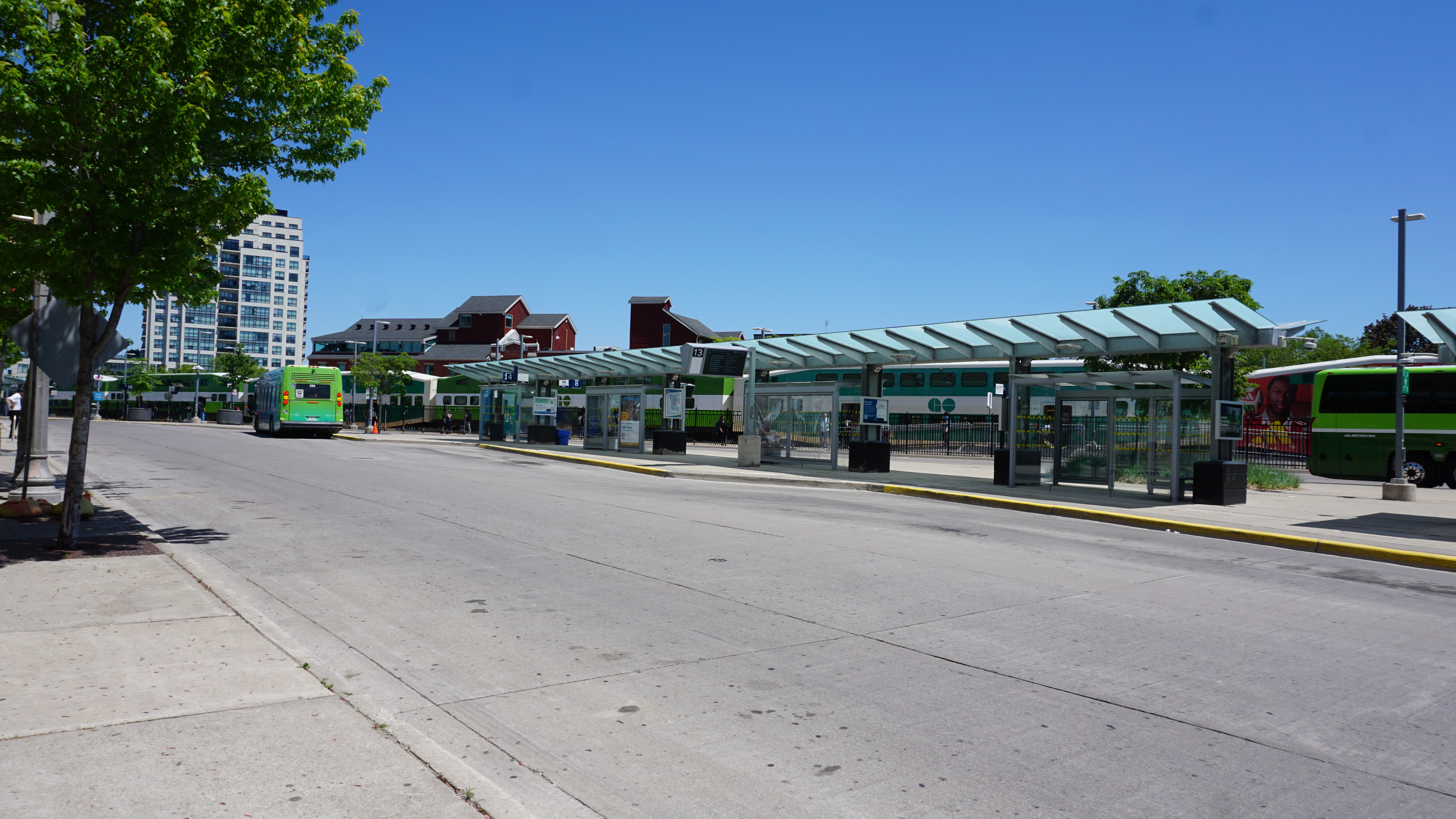
Bus platform

Guelph Central Station provides an exchange with both local and regional bus services. Bays 1-20 are located on an island bus platform, while bays 21 and 22 are located on the south side of Macdonell Street, immediately adjacent to the island platform. Bus platform allocation are as follows:

Bay	Provider	No.	Route / Note
1	Guelph Transit	2A	West Loop Clockwise
2	Guelph Transit	16	Southgate
3	Guelph Transit	10	Imperial
4	Guelph Transit	5	Goodwin
5	Guelph Transit	3A	East Loop Clockwise
6	Guelph Transit	3B	East Loop Counter Clockwise
7	Guelph Transit	8	Stone Road Mall
8	Guelph Transit	9	Waterloo
9	Guelph Transit	CS	Community Bus South
10	Guelph Transit	CN	Community Bus North
11			
12	GO Transit	29	Guelph - Mississauga
12	GO Transit	31	Guelph - Georgetown
13	GO Transit	33	Guelph - North York
14	Guelph Transit	20	Northwest Industrial
15	Guelph Transit	11	Willow West
18	Guelph Transit	13	Victoria Road Recreation Centre
19	Guelph Transit	12	General Hospital
20	Guelph Transit	2B	West Loop Counter Clockwise
21	Guelph Transit	4	York
22	Guelph Transit	14	Grange

== See also ==
- List of designated heritage railway stations of Canada
- Quebec City–Windsor Corridor (Via Rail) – trans-provincial passenger rail corridor which includes Guelph
- Rail transport in Ontario
