= Belleville station (Ontario) =

Railway station in Ontario, Canada

Belleville
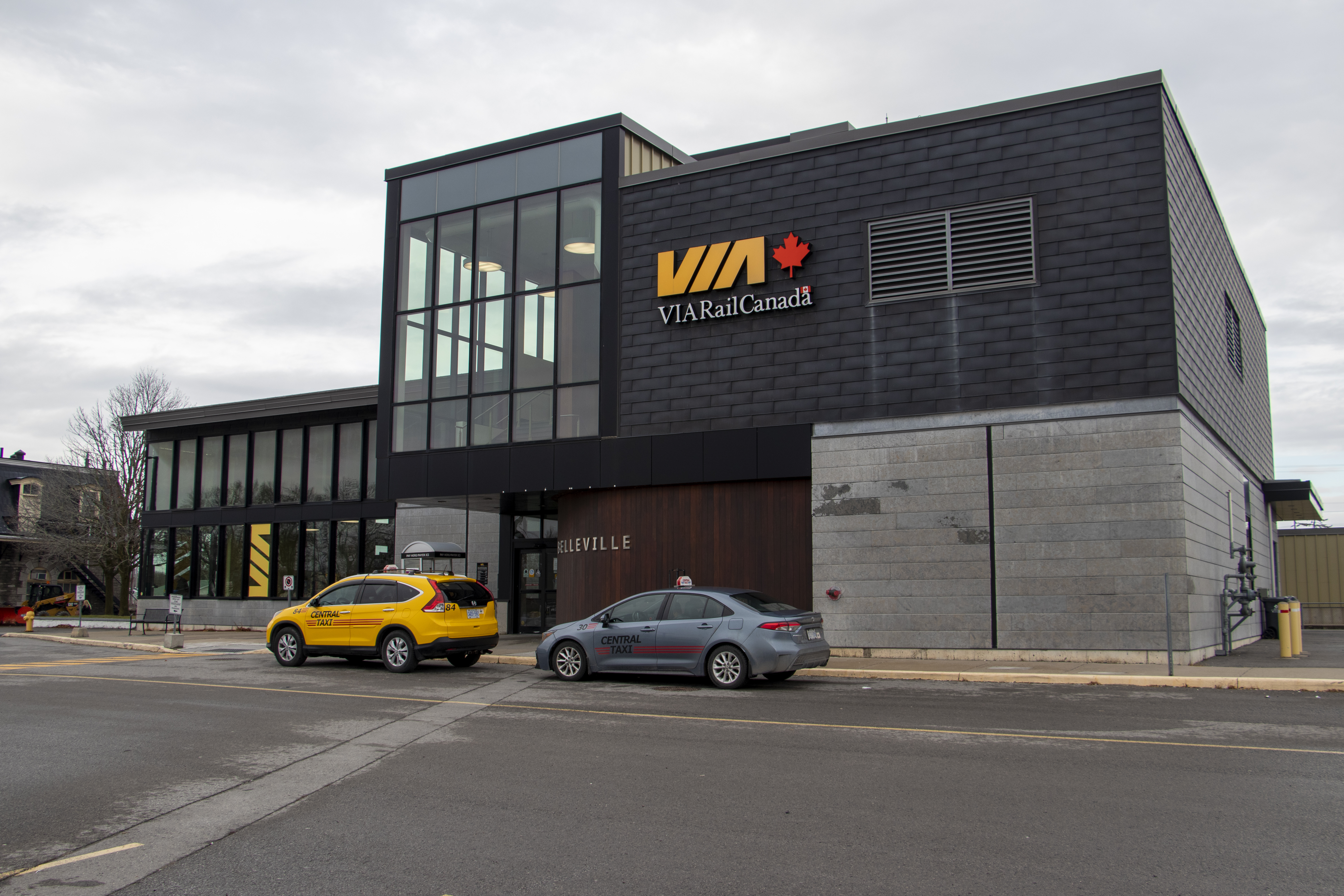
- Belleville station, December 2023

General information
- Location: 220 Station Street; Belleville, Ontario; Canada
- Coordinates: 44°10′46″N 77°22′29″W
- Platforms: 1 side platform, 1 island platform
- Tracks: 3

Construction
- Parking: Outdoor, pay, long term
- Cycle facilities: bicycle box
- Accessible: Yes

Other information
- Status: Staffed station

History
- Opened: 1856
- Rebuilt: 2012

Services
Preceding station	Via Rail	Following station
Trenton Junction toward Toronto	Toronto–Ottawa	Napanee toward Ottawa
Cobourg toward Toronto	Toronto–Montreal	Kingston toward Montreal
Former services
Preceding station	Canadian National Railway	Following station
Trenton Junction toward Sarnia	Grand Trunk Railway; Main Line	Shannonville toward Montreal
Corbyville toward Toronto	Toronto – Belleville via Peterboro	Terminus

National Historic Site of Canada
- Designated: 1973
- Reference no.: 7368

Heritage Railway Station (Canada)
- Designated: 1992
- Reference no.: 4552
Location

The Belleville railway station in Belleville, Ontario, Canada is served by Via Rail trains running from Toronto to Ottawa and Montreal. The station is staffed, with ticket sales, vending machines, telephones, washrooms, and wheelchair access to the station and trains.

== History ==
=== 1856 Grand Trunk station ===
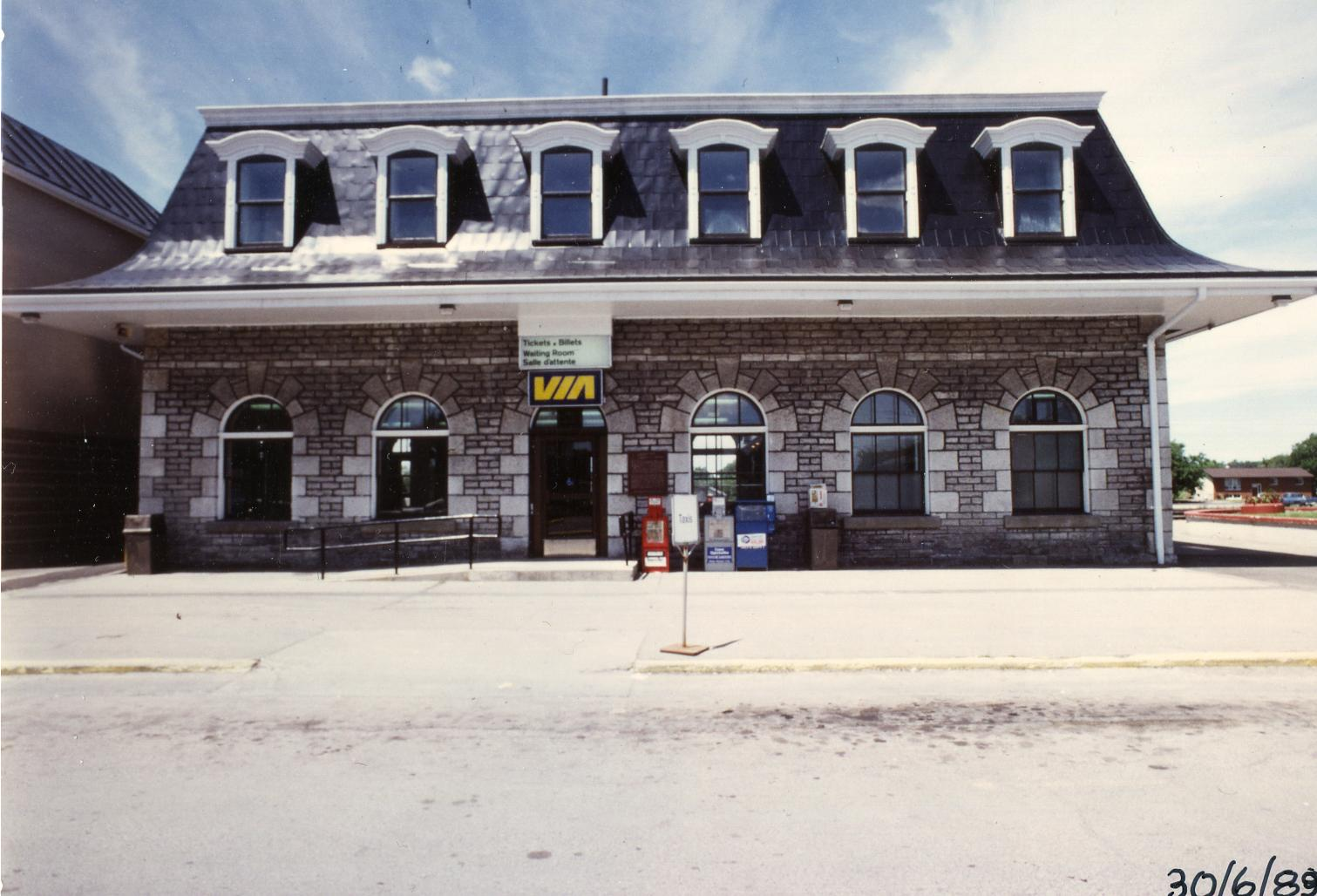
Front view of the station in 1989.

Built from bluish-grey Trenton limestone in 1856 by Thomas Brassey for Canadian National Railway predecessor Grand Trunk Railway, the station was designated a National Historic Site of Canada in 1973 and protected under the Heritage Railway Stations Protection Act since 1992.

It is the oldest of multiple buildings which were once part of Belleville's GTR station yard, a facility which employed 100 by 1864 and included one of the first three GTR locomotive shops. A new locomotive shop was built in 1867, increasing capacity to 24 engines. GTR cutbacks in December 1876 led to a violent labour dispute on December 29 which stopped all trains; the Queen's Own Rifles militia deployed from Toronto on January 2, 1877 to end the strike. A new round house was built in 1912 to accommodate 42 engines, with a wheel shed and machine shop adjacent. With over a thousand people at its peak, the railway became Belleville's largest local employer.

The 220 Station Street waiting room, a mid-size "Second Class Wayside Station" at the October 27, 1856 inception of the Grand Trunk mainline, served until the adjacent modern station building opened on March 20, 2012. While this building has always served only passengers, with telegraphy and freight located in other buildings, much of the original interior was lost due to 1987 and earlier renovations. Just east of the main station building, a freight shed stored VIA's baggage carts; its basement was home to The Belleville Model Railroad Club

While three original stations from the 1850s Grand Trunk line remain in active use at Georgetown, Port Hope and Napanee, all are small single-storey "Type C" stations (typically five curved arches for windows and doors on the sides and two at each end). Belleville is a larger station ("Type B", six arches) and the last intact original station on the line to have been expanded with a second storey. A similar Outer Station existed at Kingston, but was abandoned in the 1970s and is now in ruins.

=== 1911 Canadian Northern / Canadian Pacific station ===
CN's historic Grand Trunk station was once one of two active passenger terminals in the city. The Canadian Pacific Railway used a former 1911 Canadian Northern Railway station on Church Street to handle Ottawa-Toronto traffic until 1966; that building was demolished in 1976.

=== 2012 Via Rail station ===
On November 10, 2010, Via Rail unveiled a design for a contemporary CA$18 million station building which would be wheelchair accessible with space to accommodate expanded track lines. Built at 250 Station Street, adjacent to the historic station, the new facility accepted its first passengers on March 20, 2012. MP Daryl Kramp officially opened the station on September 12, 2012.

The original station is marked with a Historic Sites and Monuments Board of Canada plaque; as of 2012, the city and local groups are looking for new uses for the old station.

== Services ==
Belleville station is served by most trains on Via Rail's Toronto-Ottawa and Toronto-Montreal routes, though a small number of express trains pass through the station without stopping.

As of October 2023, the station is served by six to eight trains per day toward Ottawa, four or five trains per day toward Montreal and between nine and eleven trains per day toward Toronto.

== See also ==
- List of designated heritage railway stations of Canada
