= Stone Road Mall =

Coordinates: 43°31′08″N 80°14′17″W

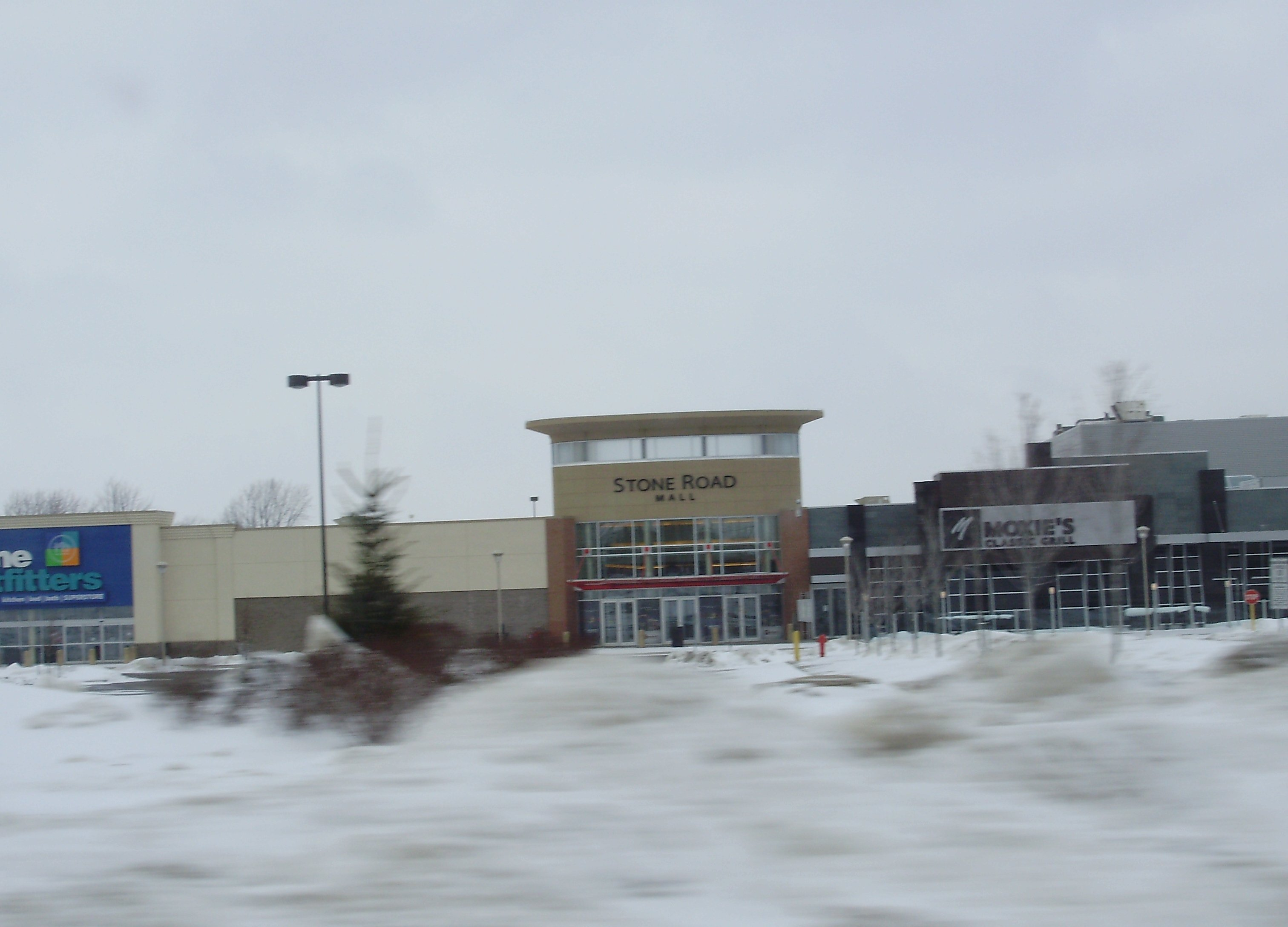
- Location: 435 Stone Road West; Guelph, Ontario; N1G 2X6
- Opened: 1975
- Manager: Primaris Management Inc.
- Owner: Primaris
- Num. of stores: 130
- Num. of anchor tenants: 513,699 sq ft (47,724.2 m^{2})
- Floors: 3
- Public transit: Guelph Transit Stone Road Mall
- Website: stoneroadmall.ca

Stone Road Mall is a shopping mall in Guelph, Ontario, Canada, situated at Stone Road West and Edinburgh Road. It is the largest shopping mall in Guelph, with approximately 520,000 square feet (50,000 m^{2}) of gross leasable area and 130 stores. It is operated by Primaris Management Inc., and its anchors are Marshalls, Sport Chek, and Chapters-Indigo following the closure of the third anchor tenant, Sears. The area of the former Sears Canada was demolished and became an expansion of the mall in late 2019. Insomnia Cookies, HomeSense and Mark's now occupy that location since July 10, 2026.

== History ==
Stone Road Mall first opened in 1975 with a Kmart, Miracle Food Mart, and 35 other stores. In 1978 it doubled to 70 stores, including Sears. The shopping centre finished an expansion and remodelling of the western section of the mall. There is an ongoing expansion and remodelling of the eastern area of the mall.

The Sears store closed in January 2018 due to its bankruptcy and liquidation.

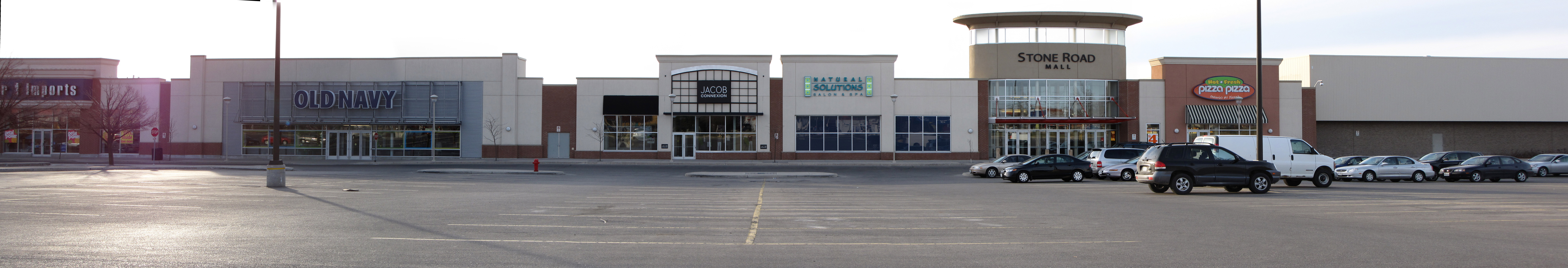
Panorama showing the eastern entrance to the mall
