= Trenton Junction station =

Railway station in Ontario, Canada

Trenton Junction
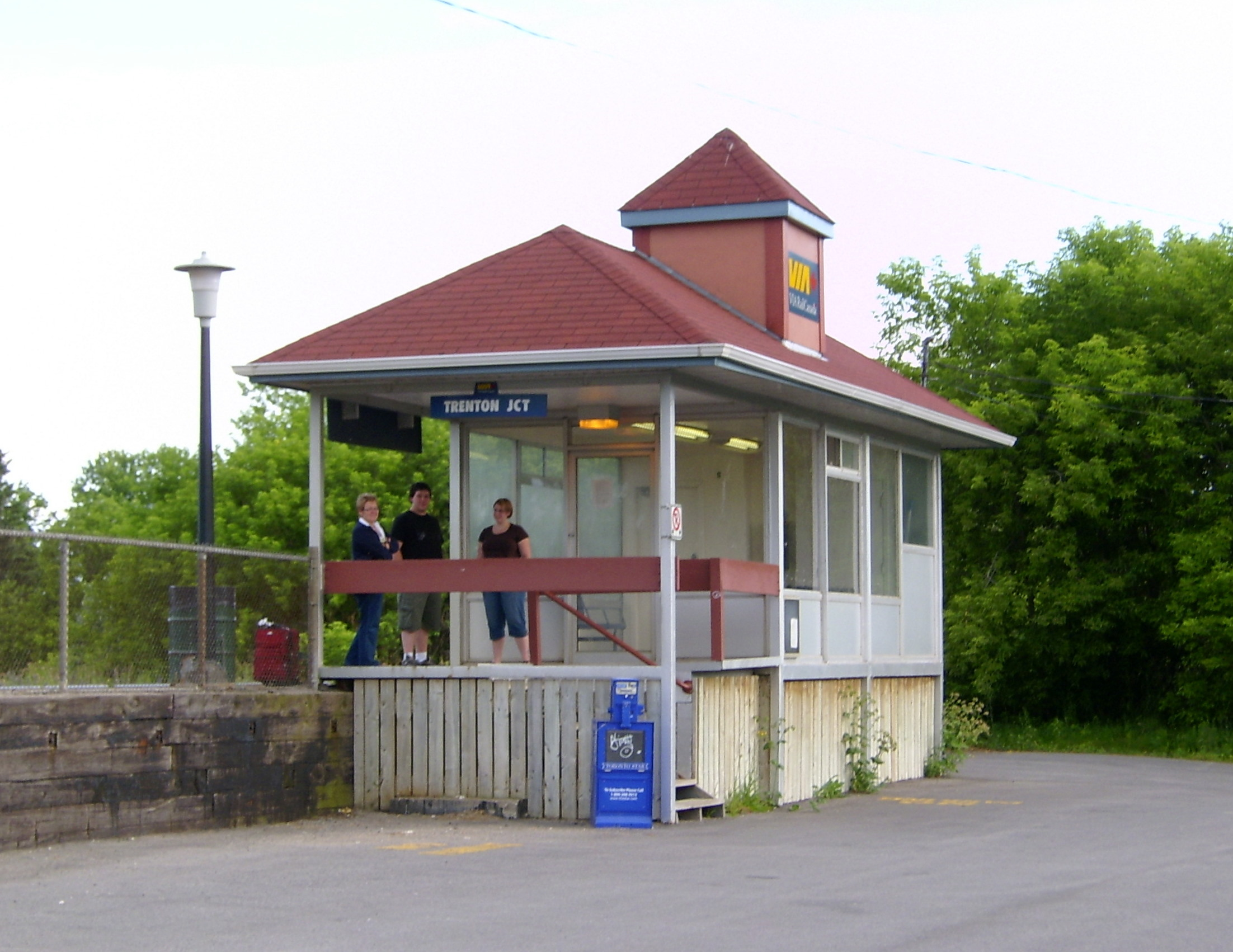

General information
- Location: 18277B Telephone Road, Quinte West, Ontario; Canada
- Coordinates: 44°06′56″N 77°35′55″W
- Platforms: 1 side platform
- Tracks: 2
- Bus operators: FlixBus

Construction
- Parking: Yes
- Accessible: yes

Other information
- Status: Shelter with a waiting room and washrooms
- Website: Trenton Junction train station

Services
Preceding station	Via Rail	Following station
Cobourg toward Toronto	Toronto–Ottawa	Belleville toward Ottawa
Former services
Preceding station	Canadian National Railway	Following station
Smithfield toward Sarnia	Grand Trunk Railway; Main Line	Belleville toward Montreal
Trenton toward Picton	Central Ontario Railway Main Line	Frankford toward Maynooth
Location
- Location within Southern Ontario Location within Ontario Location within Canada

Trenton Junction railway station (French: Gare de Trenton Junction) is an unstaffed inter-city train station at 18277B Telephone Road in Trenton, Ontario, Canada operated by Via Rail. The station is located 2.5 kilometres (1.6 mi) south of Ontario Highway 401 on Ontario Highway 33 and serves trains running from Toronto to Ottawa on the Quebec City–Windsor Corridor.

The unstaffed station shelter is heated and has telephones and washrooms. It is opened 60 minutes prior to train arrivals at the station and remains open for 30 minutes following train departures.

== Services ==
Trenton Junction station is only served by local trains on Via Rail's Toronto-Ottawa route. Most Toronto-Ottawa trains, and all Toronto-Montreal trains, pass through the station without stopping.

As of October 2023 the station is served by 2 to 3 trains per day toward Ottawa and 2 trains per day toward Toronto.

FlixBus seasonal service from Toronto and Picton stops at this station.
