= Cobourg station =

Railway station in Ontario, Canada

Cobourg
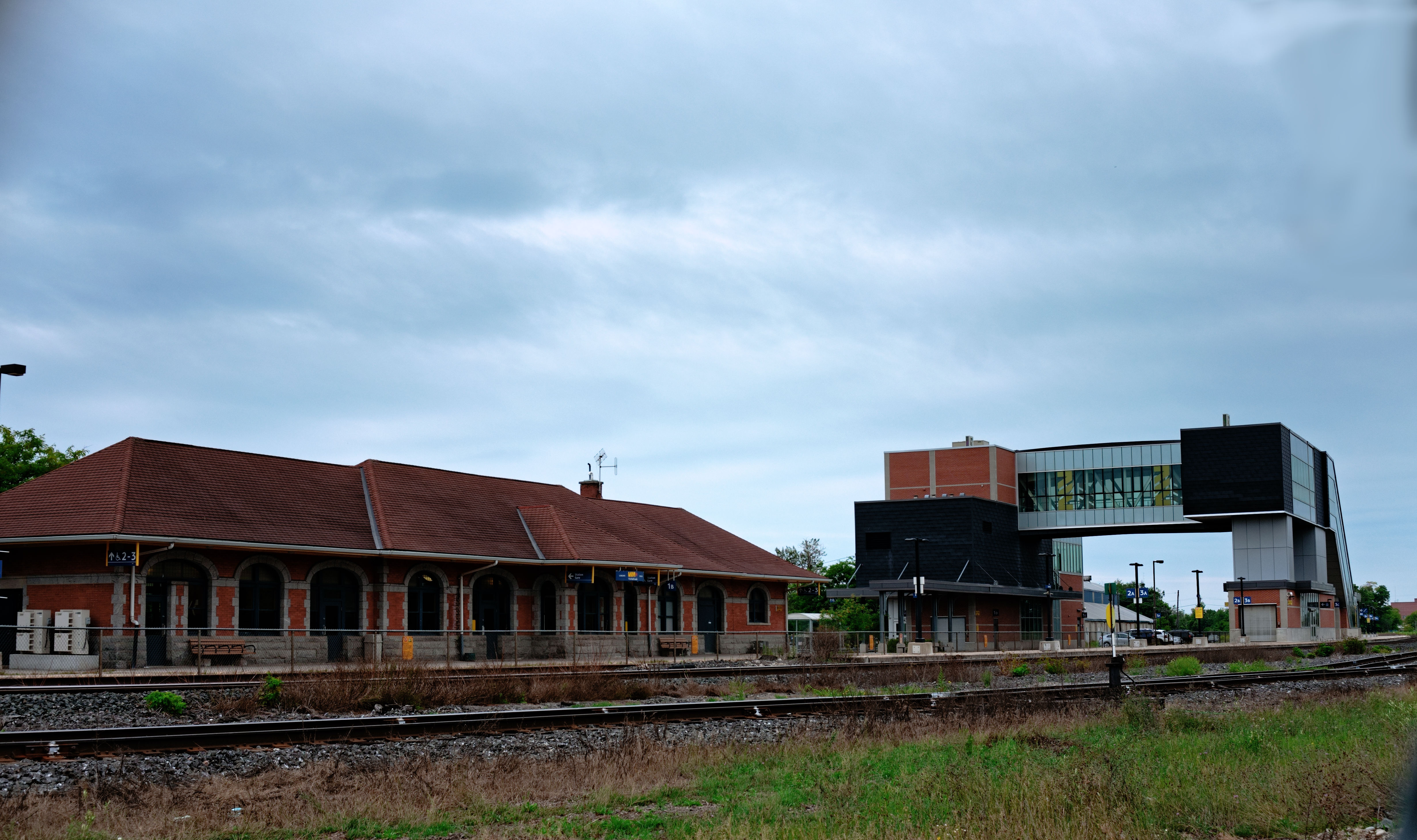

General information
- Location: 563 Division Street, Cobourg, Ontario; Canada
- Coordinates: 43°58′05″N 78°10′15″W
- Owner: Via Rail
- Platforms: 1 side platform, 1 island platform
- Tracks: 4

Construction
- Parking: Yes
- Cycle facilities: Yes
- Accessible: yes

Other information
- Status: Staffed station
- Station code: VIA Rail: CBRG; IATA: XGJ
- Website: Cobourg train station

History
- Rebuilt: 2011

Services
Preceding station	Via Rail	Following station
Port Hope toward Toronto	Toronto–Ottawa	Trenton Junction toward Ottawa
Oshawa toward Toronto	Toronto–Montreal	Belleville toward Montreal
Former services
Preceding station	Canadian National Railway	Following station
Port Hope toward Sarnia	Grand Trunk Railway; Main Line	Grafton toward Montreal
Location
- Location within Southern Ontario Location within Ontario Location within Canada

The Cobourg railway station in Cobourg, Ontario, Canada, is served by Via Rail trains running between Toronto, Ottawa, and Montreal. The station is staffed, with ticket sales, free outdoor parking, and a wheelchair lift for access to the trains. There is no local transit service into the station, with the nearest bus stop being on Division Street.

== History ==
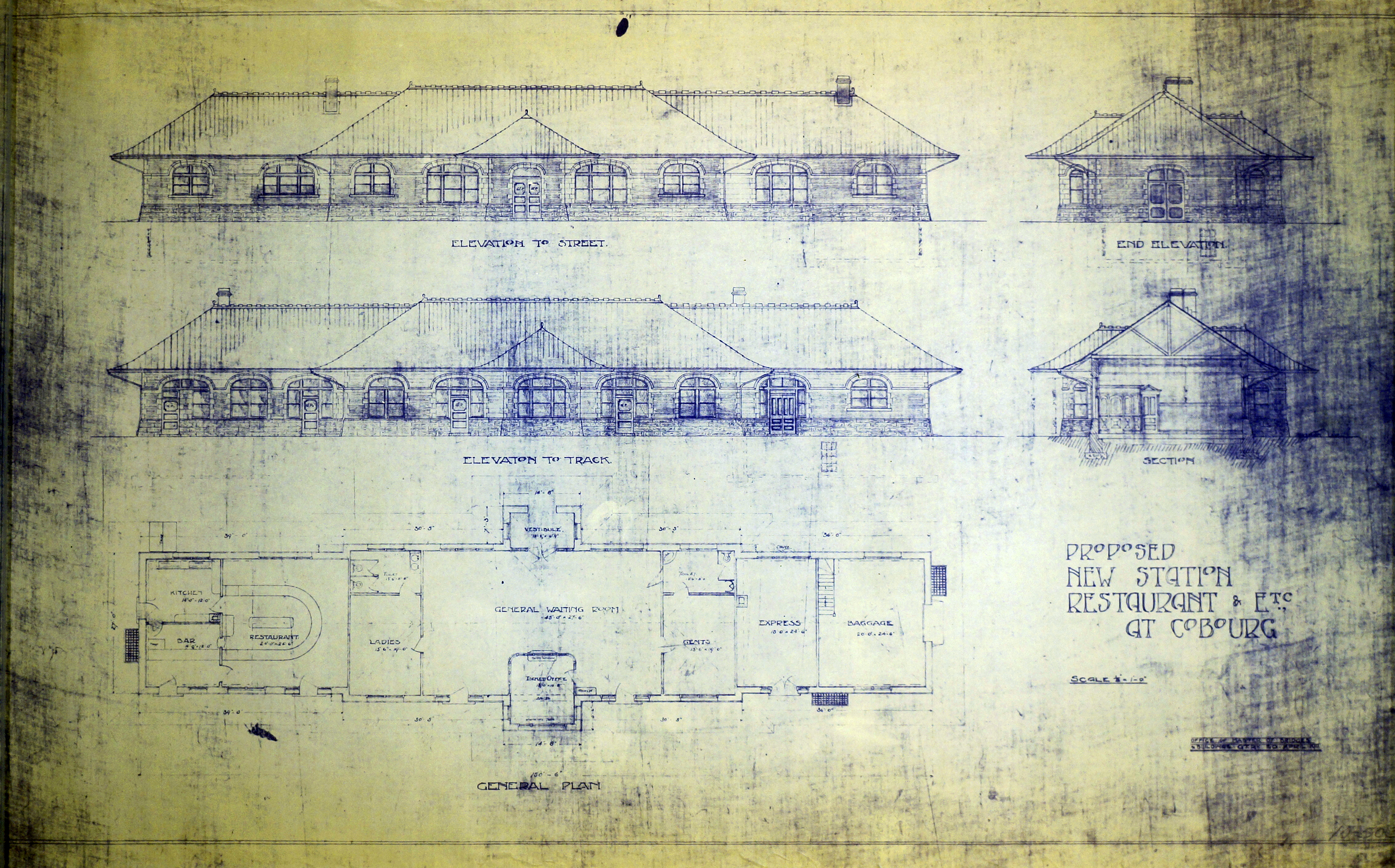
Blueprints for the original station building

On November 12, 2010, Via Rail unveiled a design for a new station building, which was built next to the existing station. The new building was estimated to cost $9 million CDN, is wheelchair accessible, and contains a new island/boarding platform to accommodate expanded track lines with an overhead footbridge.

== Services ==
Cobourg station is served by most trains on Via Rail's Toronto-Ottawa and Toronto-Montreal routes, though a small number of express trains pass through the station without stopping.

As of October 2023 the station is served by 6 to 7 trains per day toward Ottawa, and 3 to 4 trains per day toward Montreal and 8 trains per day toward Toronto.

== See also ==
- List of designated heritage railway stations of Canada
