= Guelph Transit =

Public transportation agency

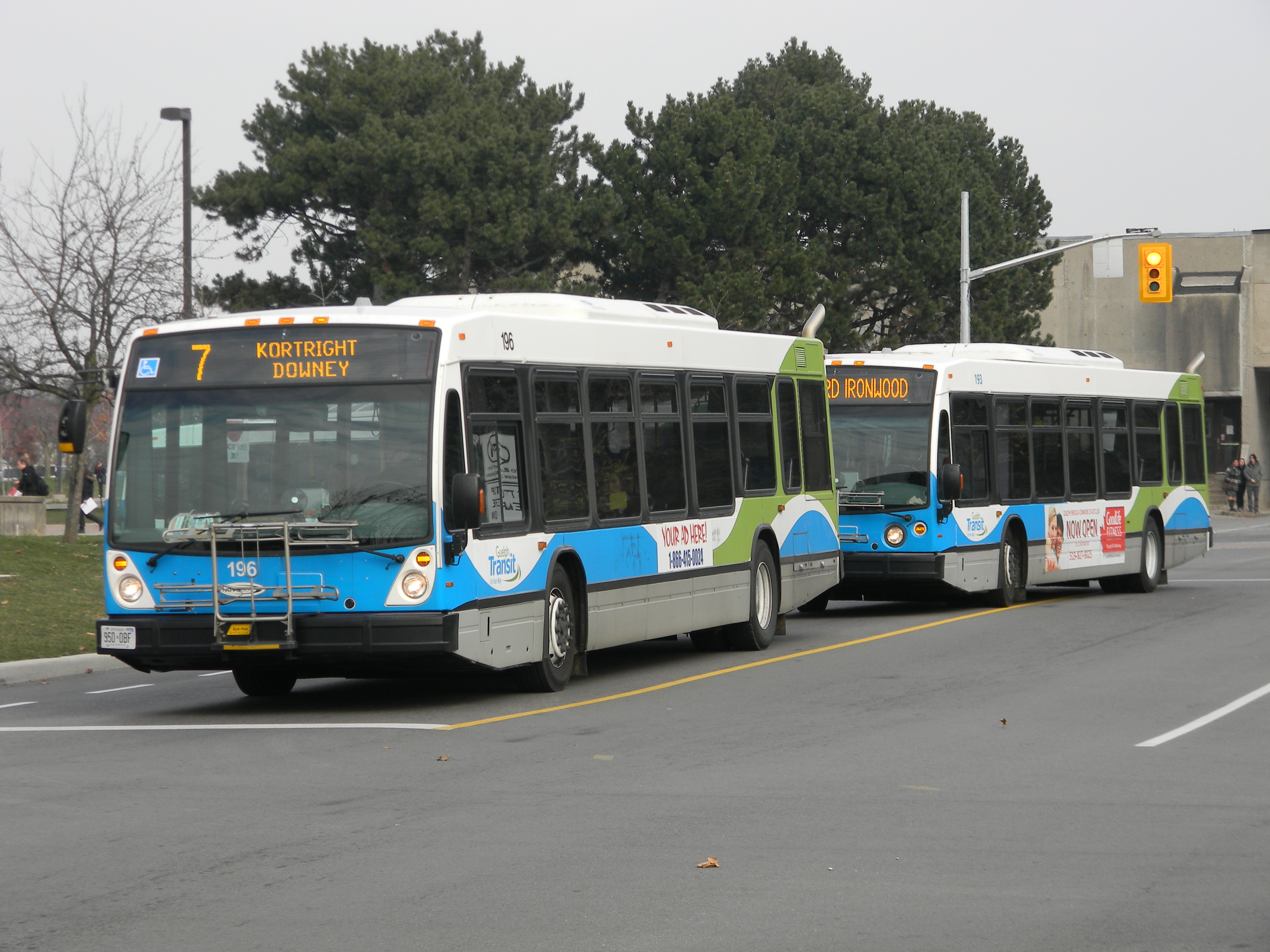
- Founded: 1895 (Street Railway)
- Headquarters: 170 Watson Rd S.
- Service area: Guelph
- Service type: Bus service, Paratransit
- Routes: 21 day service, 5 University Express, 5 Late Night
- Hubs: 4
- Fleet: 70 buses
- Daily ridership: 20,000
- Operator: City of Guelph
- Website: Guelph Transit

Most buses still carry the old city crest, as the new branding gets phased in

The Guelph Transit Commission is a small public transportation agency that operates transit bus services in Guelph, Ontario, Canada. Established in 1929 after the closure of the Guelph Radial Railway Company streetcar lines, Guelph Transit has grown to comprise over 87 buses serving 28 transit routes.

The main terminals are located downtown at Guelph Central Station and at the University of Guelph, with a smaller facility at Stone Road Mall and the SmartCentres mall on Woodlawn Road. Via Rail's Toronto-Sarnia route, GO Transit trains on the Kitchener line, as well as various GO Transit buses, stop at Guelph Central Station.

== History ==
The City of Guelph is located approximately 55 miles (89 km) west of Toronto. Nicknamed the Royal City (reflecting the House of Hanover, known in its native Germany as the House of Welf), Guelph's street railway operated from 1895 until 1939 along five routes. It was also the western terminus of the Guelph line of the Toronto Suburban Railway.

=== Street railway ===
By the late 19th century, Guelph had become such a size that public transportation had pretty much become a necessity. Serious discussion concerning a street railway began in 1875, and the Guelph Street Railway Company was formed in 1877. The company failed to get a franchise for its proposed horse-car line, and the idea was abandoned.

==== The Sleeman line ====
In 1894, Guelph City Council granted a street railway franchise to local businessman George Sleeman for a term of twenty years, for which the Guelph Railway Company was incorporated in April 1895. Construction began immediately thereafter, using 56 pound rail. The initial route of the GRC was south along Woolwich Street, through the downtown and along Dundas Road, with a second line running from the Sleeman owned Silvercreek Brewery on Waterloo Avenue, to the Canadian Pacific and Grand Trunk (later Canadian National) Railway stations. Total distance of these two lines was approximately 4 1/2 miles (7.2 km). Electrical equipment for 600 volt operation, three closed and two open cars were supplied by the Canadian General Electric Company. A stone car-barn and powerhouse were also built. The carbarn later served as the garage for the Guelph Transportation Commission buses until the 1970s, and still stands today at 371 Waterloo Avenue.

Sleeman operated a brewery on Waterloo Avenue and expected that his employees would travel back and forth to work on his system. He also built a skating rink and park behind his brewery.

Operation began on September 17, 1895, with 20 minute service being provided between 5 am and 11 pm, Monday to Saturday. New lines were soon built including Suffolk, added in 1896, O.A.C (Ontario Agricultural College) in 1902 and York Road in 1911.

The Company's charter was extended in 1901 to provide for a line to be constructed to Hespeler, forming a loop line with Puslinch Lake.

==== Guelph Radial Railway ====
George Sleeman continued to own the line until late 1902 when control passed to the Bank of Montreal and the Traders Bank of Canada. The name of the company was also changed to the Guelph Radial Railway Company, with authority to build lines to Mount Forest, Erin, Galt and Preston, but none of these lines were ever built. The City of Guelph was also authorized to acquire the company, which it subsequently did, with related legislation being passed in 1905.

Ridership doubled between 1902 and 1906 resulting in more rolling stock being purchased in 1906 and again in 1911. In 1903, the city of Guelph purchased the street railway for $78,000, which included eight miles of track, eight closed and three open cars.

Freight service had been introduced in 1900 using a small four-wheel locomotive, with traffic being interchanged with the Grand Trunk Railway. This business increased to a point where in 1911 a new 27-short ton locomotive, #26, was purchased from Preston Car & Coach, along with two 2-truck 'Prairie' type streetcars, #60 and #70. In 1913, another 'Prairie' car, #80, was added with two more, #90 and #100, being acquired in 1914. The Prairie cars were 45 feet 10 inches (13.97 m) in length and were double ended. All five 'Prairie' cars were transferred to the Toronto and York Radial Railway in 1925 and renumbered 151 to 155. A second freight interchange was added on Suffolk Street in 1915 and a connection was made with the new Toronto Suburban Railway line in 1917.

==== Ontario Hydro ====
Both Canadian Pacific and Ontario Hydro made offers to buy the Guelph system. Ontario Hydro won out and took title to the Railway, under the name Ontario Hydro Electric Railways–Guelph District, on May 21, 1921. Some lines were rebuilt and some extended, and Sunday service began July 25, 1921. Seven single-truck Birney cars numbered 219 to 225 were acquired in 1922. These were built by Canadian Brill at the former Preston Car & Coach plant in nearby Preston, Ontario.

The first bus, a 29-seat Gotfredson, was placed in service in 1926 on Eramosa Road. This service was discontinued on October 31, 1927, due to significant losses, however, the service was reinstated the following year with a smaller bus. A second bus was used when streetcar tracks were under repair.

Operating losses began to climb beginning in 1927. The Suffolk line was removed in 1929 due to its poor condition and the cost of rebuilding, being replaced by bus service.

In 1926, Ontario Hydro tried to sell the system back to the City of Guelph, but were refused. Finally, in June 1937, City Council recommended the discontinuance of the streetcars, September 30, 1937, being the final day of operation, buses replacing them the next day. In 1939, the Ontario Legislature passed an Act transferring the system to the newly created Guelph Transportation Commission (now called Guelph Transit). Electric freight service continued to operate until May 26, 1939.

=== Bus service to the present day ===
Guelph Transit has bus routes that cover the entire city. Sunday service was added in 2001, new routes were added over the last five years. Guelph Transit's garage and other city works moved from Waterloo Avenue to 12 Municipal Street in the 1970s. In the late 1990s, a new transit facility was constructed on Watson Road.

On June 20, 2007, Guelph Transit launched a web-based system known as Next Bus. Global positioning system (GPS) technology and advanced computer modelling allow riders to receive accurate, real-time arrival and departure information via the Internet, handheld devices (including Palms, Blackberries, and Web-capable cellular phones), or their telephones. This system has proven frustrating to some Guelph residents, as Guelph Transit no longer posted paper copies of bus arrival times at bus stops; a user standing at a bus stop without a cell phone had no way of determining when the next bus would arrive. Additionally, the system's predictions have been known to be wildly inaccurate.

The new system features web-based map displays with local streets and routes, and real-time information available on the web. It will also incorporate dynamic transit display signs at key locations around the city. One such sign is already in place at Stone Road Mall. However, the service is limited in that the time displayed is linked to the scheduled arrival on the applicable timetable, not the anticipated arrival based upon the current location of the bus.

Guelph Transit added holiday service in 2007 as well as additional routes serving the south end of the city. Services on these routes (56, 57, and 58) were suspended in April 2008, and the 54 Arkell route was extended to St Georges Square in July 2008.

In 2009 and 2010 Guelph Transit and Dillon Consulting developed a new Transit Growth Strategy and Plan for transit and mobility services.

As identified in the 2010 budget, Guelph Transit is modifying frequency and service hours in order to achieve targeted savings. These savings will be realized by shifting from a 20-minute service frequency to a 30-minute frequency in June, July, and August. Holiday service has also been cancelled for 2010.

On January 1, 2012, Guelph Transit launched a complete new system of routes and schedules to accommodate a growing demand for change within the transit system. The system includes new transfer points at Guelph Central Station and the University of Guelph. During peak service times, buses run on a 20-minute schedule. During non-peak service times, including Saturday and Sunday, service will continue to run on a 30-minute schedule.

==== OnYourWay fare card ====
In December 2019, Guelph Transit announces that it will be launching a reloadable fare card (the OnYourWay card) in plans to phase out paper tickets. The system was launched on January 7, 2020 and OnYourWay cards were given to transit users for free until May 1, 2020, after which they are sold for $5.00. Cardholders are expected to pay when boarding the bus (at the front entrance) using a contactless card reader. The OnYourWay card can be loaded with money either through Guelph Transit's online portal or in person at one of the City of Guelph facilities listed on Guelph Transit's website. The OnYourWay card also provides transit users with balance protection in the event the card is lost or stolen. Guelph Transit has not yet announced any timeline of when it will stop accepting cash or ticket fares.

=== Future plans ===
In January 2020, The City of Guelph announced that it will be investing $177 million to purchase 67 electric transit busses and build a new bus storage facility. Guelph has received financial assistance from both provincial and federal governments. Federal Infrastructure Minister Catherine McKenna announced that The Government of Canada's contribution to the project will be $41 million, while the province of Ontario is expected to provide $35 million. The new fleet is expected to replace 30 existing diesel busses. The new bus storage facility will have the capacity for 200 busses and each parking space will be equipped with a charging apparatus. In addition, the city announced that select bus stops will also be fitted with bus charging stations. The City of Guelph has not yet provided a timeline for this project, nor has it specified from which bus manufacturer(s) the vehicles will be purchased from.

== Central Station ==
Work was underway to convert the Guelph Central Station and current Greyhound Bus Terminal into a Regional Transit Facility by 2014. The terminal opened up to Guelph Transit Buses in May 2012. The opening of the bus portion of the station was delayed from October 2011 to May 2012 to allow time for the renovations of the railway station building to be completed.

Additional renovations, with a $2.1 million budget, were completed in 2016-2017. The work also helped to preserve and restore heritage characteristics.

The following is an April 2017 summary of the operations: "Guelph Central Train Station is a busy transit hub that accommodates Guelph Transit, GO Transit, Via Rail and Greyhound Canada operations. Each weekday, more than 5,000 passengers board Guelph Transit, to travel on one of the 15 different routes that operate out of the bus bays adjacent to the train station.

In September 2016, Guelph Transit began offering early morning shuttle service for those connecting with early GO Trains. PRESTO cards could be used as a co-fare through all of the hours of GO service in Guelph.

In September 2017, Guelph Transit realigned the bus routes and schedules around the 99 Mainline, which provides bus service every 10 minutes on weekdays, and on weekends, every 15 minutes between Guelph Central Station and Clair Road and every 30 minutes from Guelph Central Station to Woodlawn Smartcentre.

== Facilities ==
=== Transit Garage ===
Address: 170 Watson Rd S, Guelph, ON N1L 1C1
Coordinates: 43°33′40.6908″N 80°11′57.534″W
Functions: office, garage and vehicle maintenance, ticket and pass sales.

=== Guelph Central Station ===
Address: 139 Carden St, Guelph, ON N1H 3A3
Coordinates: 43°32′42.7″N 80°14′45.4″W
Functions: bus route terminus and GO Transit train station

=== University Centre ===
Address: 50 Stone Rd E, Guelph, ON N1G 2W2
Coordinates: 43°31′45.2″N 80°13′28.2″W
Functions: bus route terminus and GO Transit bus route terminus

=== Stone Road Mall ===
Address: 500 Scottsdale Dr, Guelph, ON N1G 2X6
Coordinates: 43°31′06.6″N 80°14′22.6″W
Functions: bus route terminus

=== Woodlawn SmartCentres ===
Address: 47 Woodlawn Rd W, Guelph, ON N1H 1G8
Coordinates: 43°33′50.2″N 80°16′54.0″W
Functions: bus route terminus

== Bus routes ==
Maps & schedules

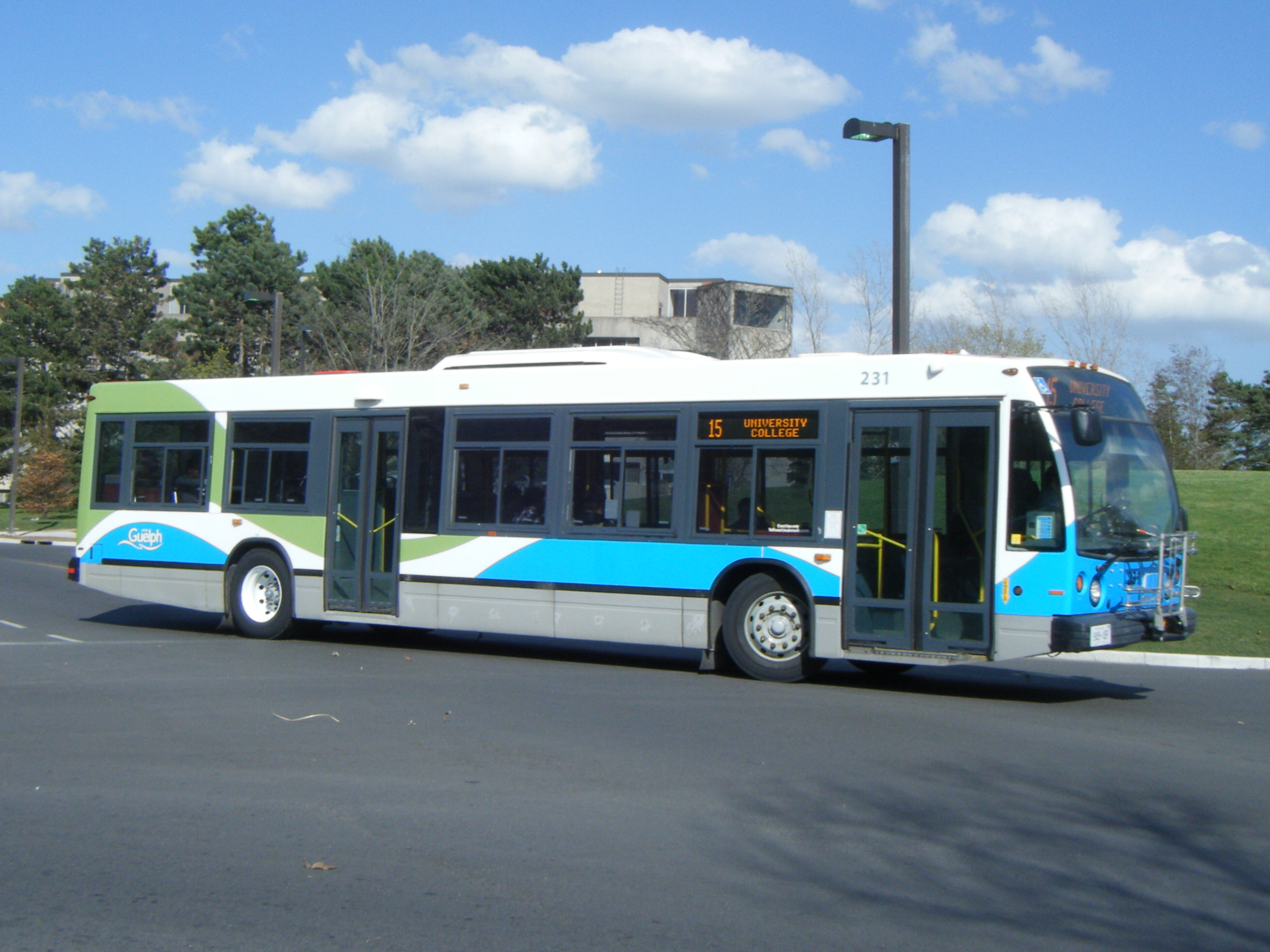
A NovaBus LFS Diesel on the 15 University College route

Routes as of 2026:

Route	Other terminuses	Notes
1 Edinburgh College	University Centre	Loops south
2 College Edinburgh	University Centre	Loops north, Becomes Route 15 at University Centre
3 Westmount	Guelph Centre Station	
4 York	Guelph Transit Garage, Guelph Central Station	
5 Goodwin	University Centre	Express service north of Gordon/Edinburgh
6 Ironwood	University Centre	Becomes route 7 at University Centre
7 Niska	University Centre	Becomes route 6 at University Centre
8 Janefield	Guelph Central Station, Stone Road Mall	Via Wellington St. S, Edinburgh
9 Waterloo	Guelph Central Station	
10 Paisley	Guelph Central Station	Becomes Route 12 at Guelph Central Station
11 Silvercreek	Guelph Central Station	
12 Delhi	Guelph Central Station, Guelph General Hospital	Becomes Route 10 at Guelph Central Station
13 Eastview	Guelph Central Station	
14 Grange	Guelph Central Station	
15 College	University Centre	Loops west, Becomes Route 2 at University Centre
16 Southgate	Clair	Becomes Route 19 at Gordon/Clair
17 Woodlawn Watson	University Centre, Stone Road Mall, Woodlawn Smartcentre	Loops West
18 Watson Woodlawn	University Centre, Woodlawn Smartcentre, Stone Road Mall	Loops East
19 Hanlon Creek	Clair, Stone Road Mall	Becomes Route 16 at Gordon/Clair
20 Northwest Industrial	Guelph Central Station	
50U Scottsdale	University Centre, Stone Road Mall	University Route (only runs Sept-Apr)
52U Kortright	University Centre	University Route (only runs Sept-Apr)
56U Colonial	University Centre	University Route (only runs Sept-Apr)
58U Edinburgh	University Centre	University Route (only runs Sept-Apr)
98 Speedvale	Guelph Central Station	
99 Mainline	Clair, University Centre, Guelph Central Station, Woodlawn Smartcentre	

Former Routes:

1 Woodlawn

1A/B Loop

2A/B Loop

3A/B Loop

5 Gordon/South Gordon

6 Auden Eastview

9 West End Recreation Centre

9 Stone Road Mall

10 Imperial

11 Willow West

12 General Hospital

13 Victoria Road Recreation Centre

15 University College

21 Paisley Imperial

22 Conestoga College

40/53 Downtown University express

41 Scottsdale Express

50 Stone

51/51A Gordon

51U Janefield

52 University Kortright

54 Arkell

55 College

56 Rickson Express

56 Victoria Express

57u Ironwood

58 Edinburgh

59u Gordon express

70/71 Perimeter

== Special routes ==
- Metro (Every second Tuesday)
- Guelph Transit GO Shuttle Service
- Beer Bus
- Zehrs Grocery Shuttle(Every Tuesday)

== Late night bus service ==
Guelph Transit, in partnership with the Central Students Association at the University of Guelph, operate several late night drop-off only routes from the University Centre between 1-3 a.m, when regular bus service has ended. This service is provided from September to April from Tuesday to Sunday, with the exception of winter break, reading week and statutory holidays.

- 99 Lite
- Ironwood Harvard Loop
- West Hanlon Scottsdale Loop
- Edinburgh Colonial Loop
- Sunday Late Night ("Magic bus") loop

== Bus fleet ==
Guelph transit's fleet consists entirely of NovaBus LFS's, with some Battery Electric LFSe+ versions.

== See also ==
- GO Transit
- Greyhound Canada
- Via Rail
- Grand River Transit
- Public transport in Canada
