= Owen Sound station =

Railway station in Owen Sound, Canada

Owen Sound
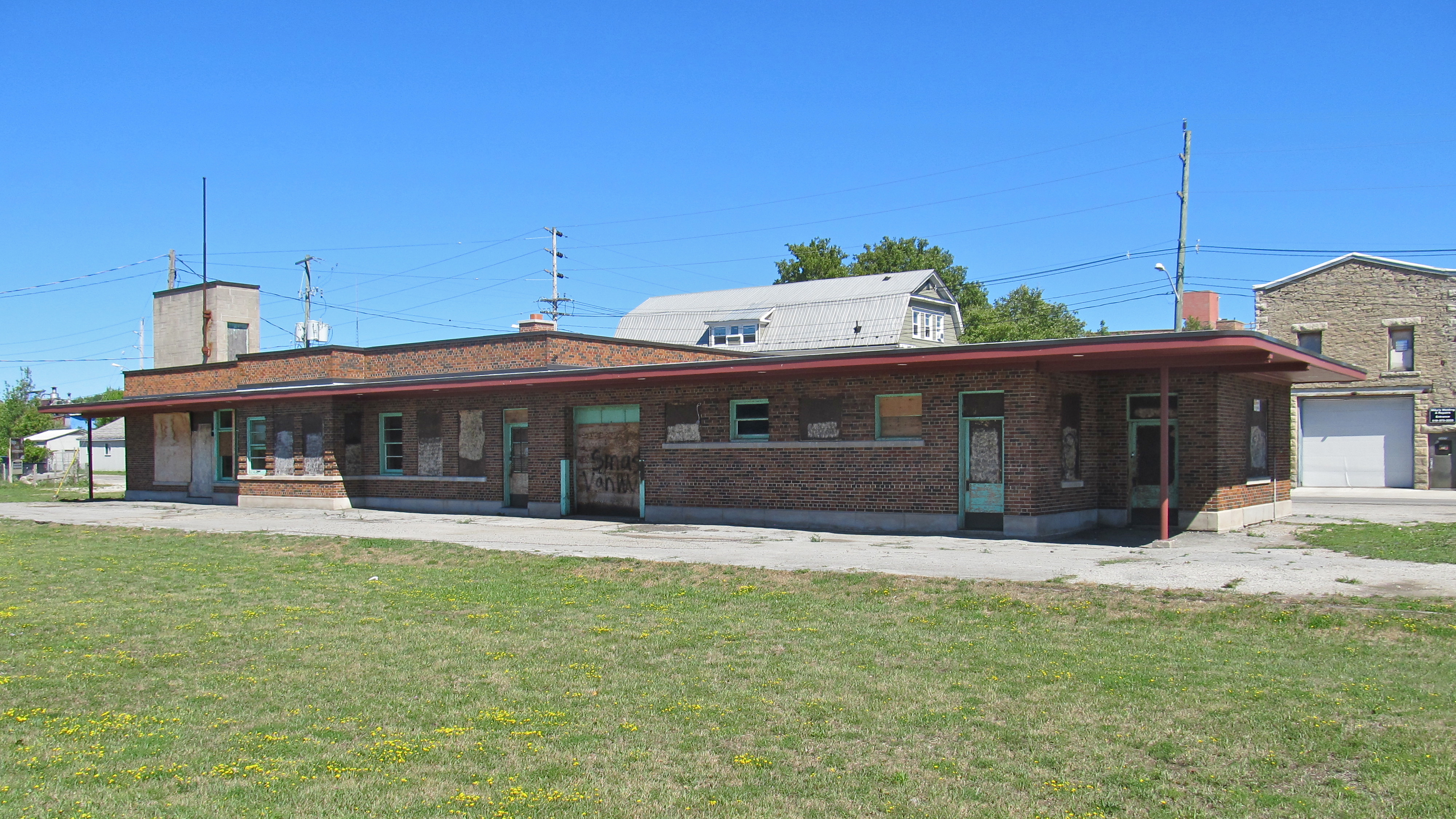
- The building in 2002

General information
- Coordinates: 44°34′20″N 80°56′32″W

Construction
- Architect: Colin Drewitt, Canadian Pacific staff architect
- Architectural style: International style

History
- Opened: 1946-1947
- Closed: passenger service: 1970, freight service: early 1990s

Former services
Preceding station	Canadian Pacific Railway	Following station
Terminus	Owen Sound – Toronto	Rockford toward Toronto

Heritage Railway Station (Canada)
- Designated: 1995

Ontario Heritage Act
- Designated: 2010
Location

The Owen Sound Railway Station in Owen Sound, Ontario, is a former Canadian Pacific Railway station. The current structure is a Designated Heritage Railway Station built in International Style between 1946 and 1947. The station is located in the port area of the city of Owen Sound, between the docks and the railway tracks.

== History ==
=== Location on the railway ===
The station was located on a branch line built in 1868 by the Toronto, Grey and Bruce Railway Company (TGBR) that rented it to the Ontario and Quebec Railway Company in 1881. The Canadian Pacific leased the Ontario and Quebec Railway Company in perpetuity in 1884. As a branch of the Owen Sound subdivision, the line winds through the area from a point located near Orangeville (milepost 36.7) to Owen Sound (milepost 107.7), for a total distance of 71 miles.

The Toronto, Grey and Bruce Railway Company arrived at Owen Sound in 1873 and built a first station . Over the course of the years, the TGBR became part of the Canadian Pacific system. The Canadian Transportation Agency noted in a 1995 decision that the branch line was not profitable at the time, with no possible hope that it could be made profitable in the near future. As such, use of the line was abandoned. The CTA noted an average annual loss of $1.4 million for the branch line.

=== Station Heritage ===
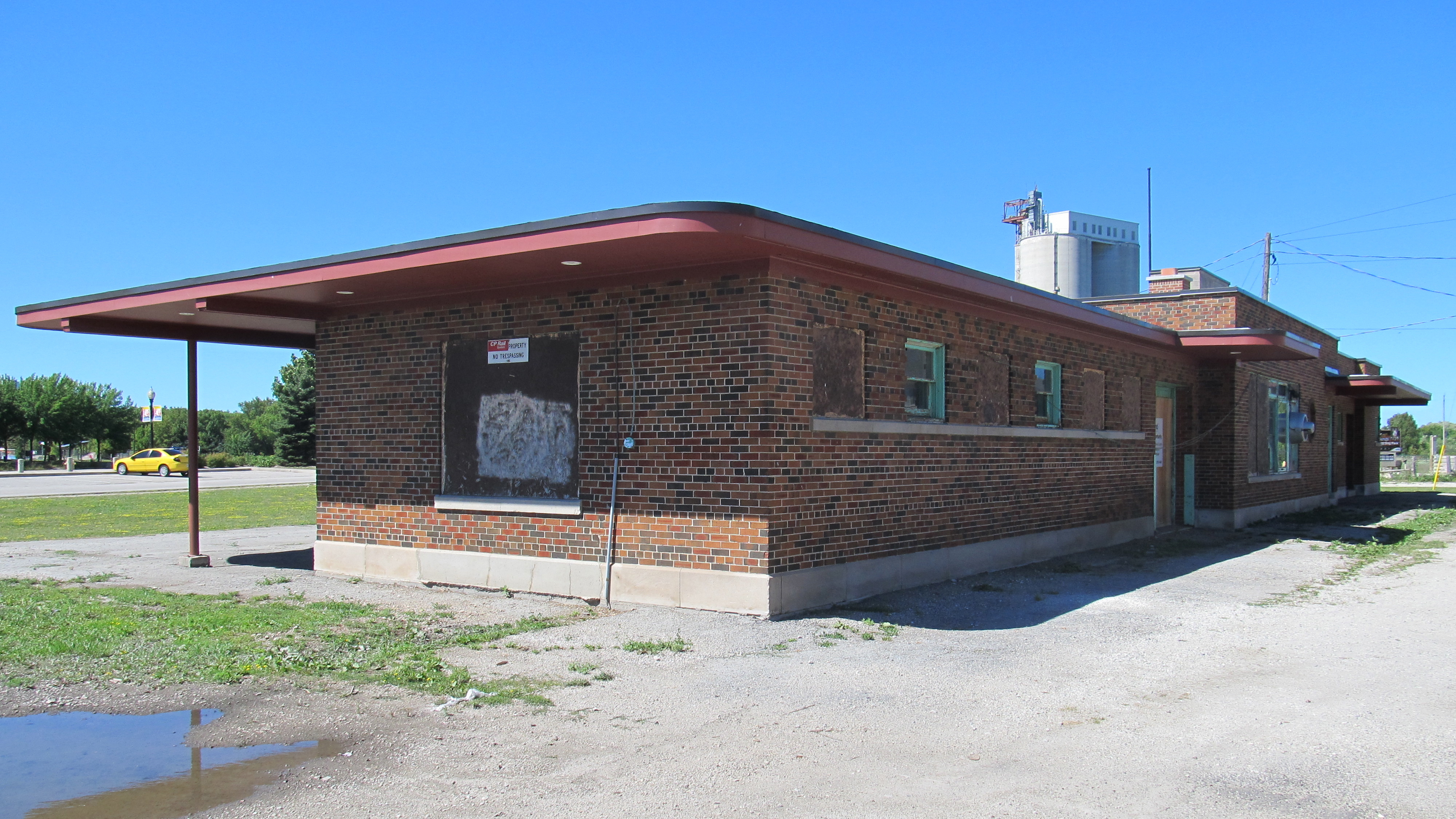
Passenger platform of the 1947 station.

The current station building has been cited as a good example of the modernization program that the CPR started after the Second World War. The railway built six stations in a similar style between 1945 and 1948, with the Owen Sound station having been the most advanced of this group of six. The Leaside Station in Toronto, which was built in a similar style, cost $145,000 and also opened in 1946.

The building has remained relatively unchanged since its construction. The elongated single-story structure has a flat roofline, with an aerodynamic-profiled stairwell adorned with limestone. The upper walls are made of multi-coloured brick resting on a limestone base. The station features certain nautical-themed elements that tie in with the dockside location, including the above-mentioned stairwell that resembles the bow of a boat and round windows that resemble portholes. The interior of the building contains well-preserved interior finishes, typical of the period when it was built. Notable are the horizontal birch paneling, moiré walnut, glass bricks, curved walls, a waiting-room area with red quarry tiles used as flooring material, smooth concrete floors and acoustic ceiling tiles. There is also a well-preserved ticket window with a metal cage and glass bricks. The original stamped aluminum fluorescent light fixtures and leather and chrome chairs are still to be found in the former waiting area.

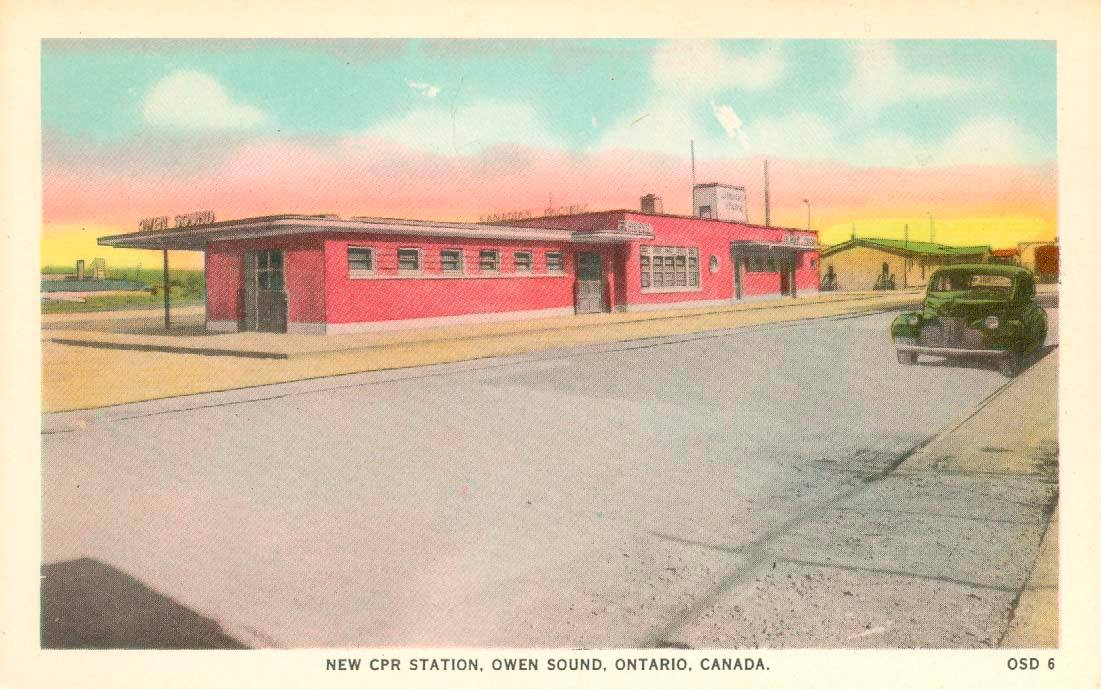
Post card showing the "new" Owen Sound station.

The train station was an internal Canadian Pacific design, done under the supervision of the Chief Engineer of the railway. Colin Drewitt, CP's in-house architect, signed the blueprints for the station on February 11, 1946, in Montreal. Drewitt designed most of the railway's post-war stations (he is known to have worked for the CPR as late as 1952). Period photos also show that the "20th Century" font was used to spell out the name of station and of the railway on the building.

=== Closure and transformation ===
Passenger service at the station stopped in 1970, and freight services continued until the early 1990s. Canadian Pacific left the area in 1994 and the rails were lifted in 1995.

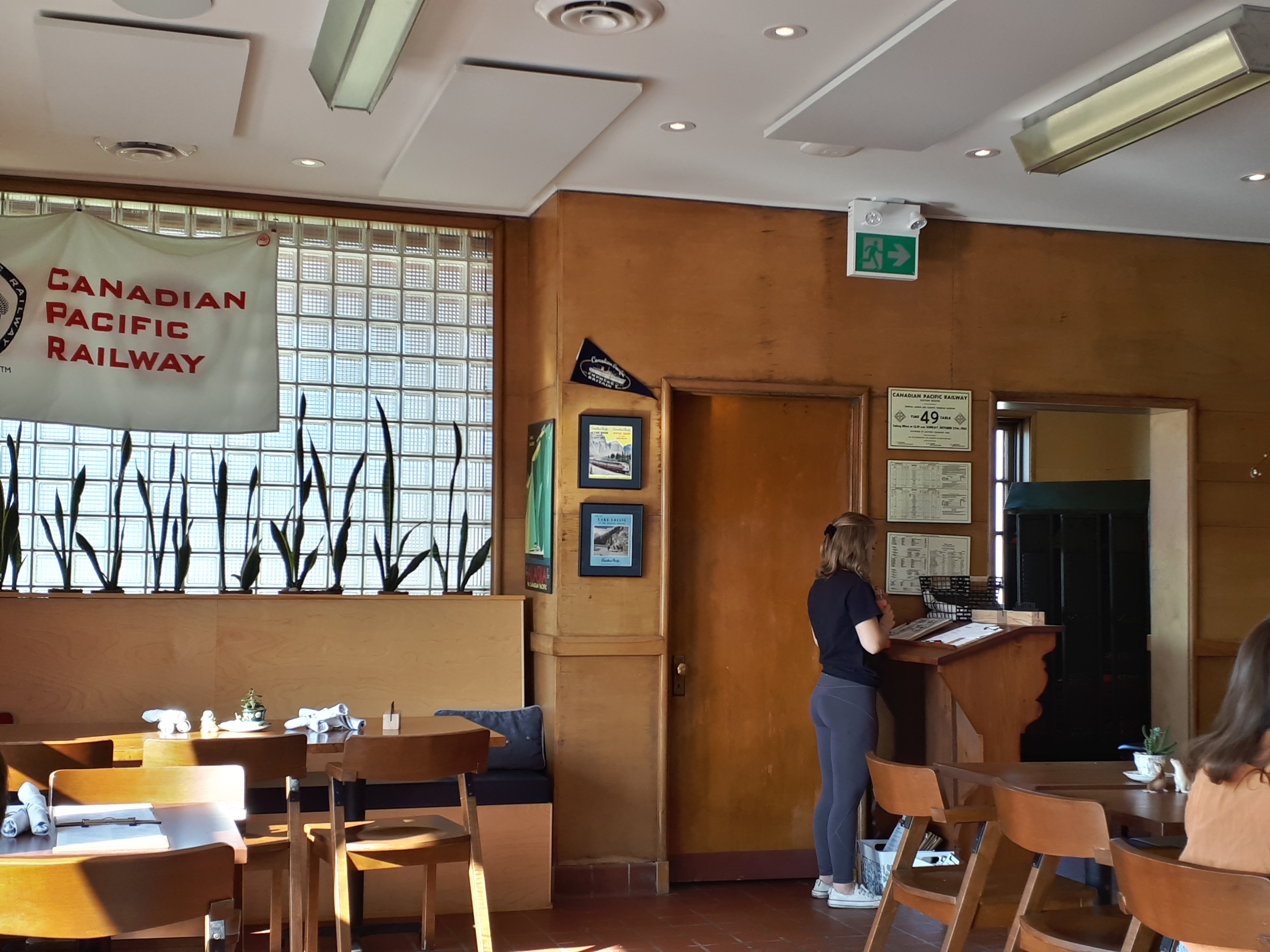
The station, operating as a brew-pub in 2019. The birch paneling, the light fixtures and the floor tiles are all original.

The City of Owen Sound purchased the station from the Canadian Government in 2010 for $153,500. As the years went on, around $200,000 was spent on roof, awning, windows and door repairs. The city has ensured protection for the heritage building under Part IV of the Ontario Heritage Act since 2010.

The station was part of "Doors Open Days" tours in 2013, along with various heritage locations in and around the city. A local paper reported that the station was free of interior clutter, but clearly showing its age at the time. This was likely the first time the general public was allowed access to the interior of the structure since passenger service stopped in 1970.

Plans for re-use of the former station were put into place between 2014 and 2016, with a potential tenant found. The tenant did not proceed with the plans and the building was left empty. In 2017, a local family decided to submit their idea to municipal council to use the building as a restaurant and brewery. The offer was accepted and a fifteen-year lease was extended to them, with two five-year renewals possible. Since the City purchased the building, it has spent around $200,000 on repairs to the exterior (with funds coming mostly from grants or subsidies). The roof, windows and doors were repaired. Problems arose when asbestos, mould and lead paint were found on the interior and needed to be fixed.

A brewery and gastropub opened onsite in 2018, called the "Mudtown Station", with an inside seating capacity of 80 and another 80 outside in the patio area.

The gastropub was awarded a Lieutenant Governor's Ontario Heritage Award in 2018.
