= Port Hope station =

Railway station in Ontario, Canada

Port Hope
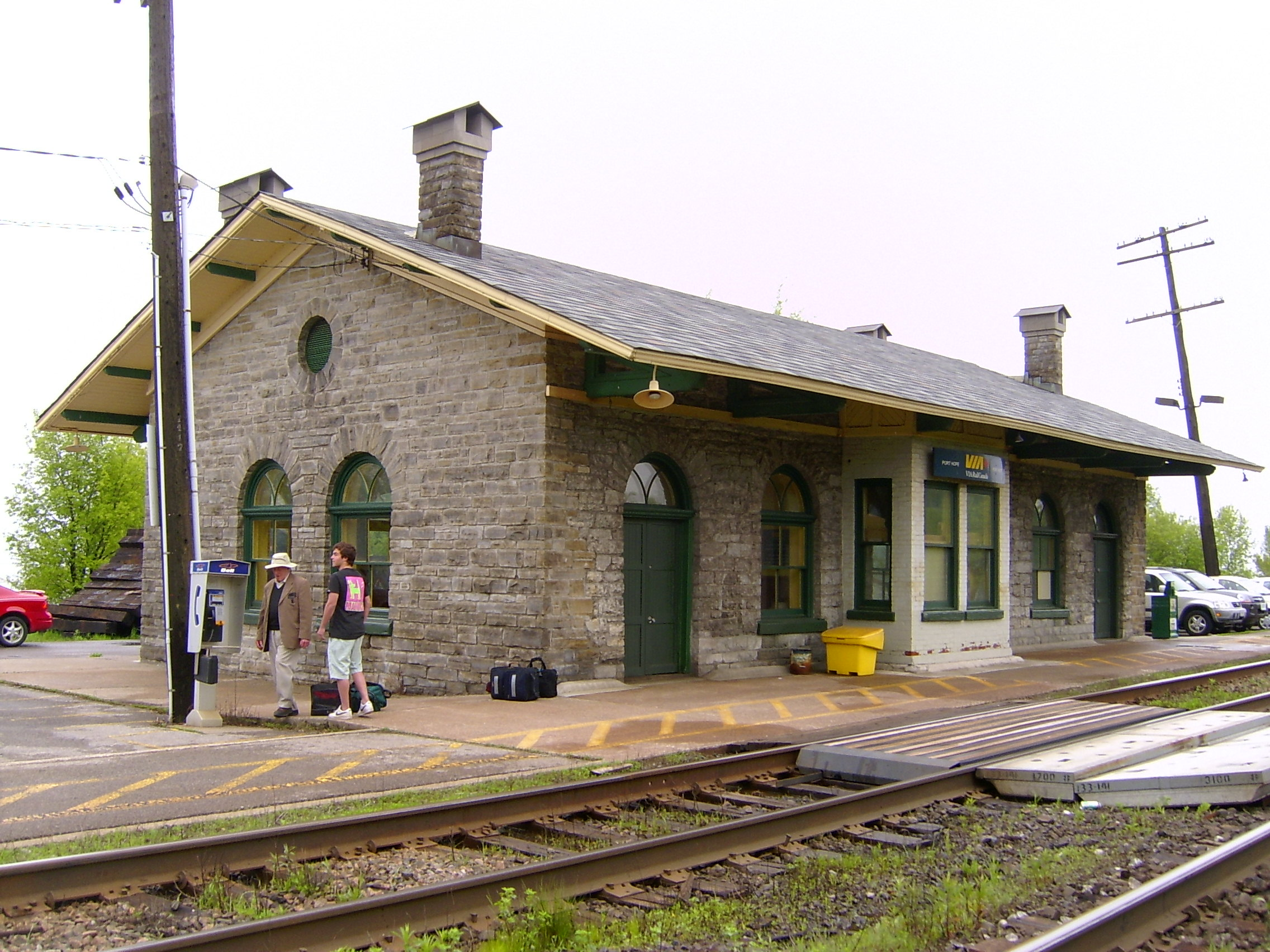

General information
- Location: Hayward Street; Port Hope, Ontario; Canada
- Coordinates: 43°56′37″N 78°17′56″W
- Owner: Via Rail
- Platforms: 1 side platform
- Tracks: 2 (1 used as freight bypass)

Construction
- Structure type: Shelter
- Platform levels: Tertiary Station
- Parking: yes
- Accessible: Yes

Other information
- Station code: IATA: XPH; Via Rail: PHOP
- Website: Port Hope train station

History
- Opened: 1856, restored 1985

Services
| Preceding station | Via Rail | Following station |
|---|---|---|
| Oshawa toward Toronto | Toronto–Ottawa | Cobourg toward Ottawa |
Former services
| Preceding station | Canadian National Railway | Following station |
|---|---|---|
| Newcastle toward Sarnia | Grand Trunk Railway; Main Line | Cobourg toward Montreal |
| Port Hope Main Street toward Toronto | Toronto – Port Hope via Peterboro | Terminus |

Heritage Railway Station (Canada)
- Designated: 1992
- Reference no.: 4553
Location
- Location within Southern Ontario Location within Ontario Location within Canada

Port Hope railway station in Port Hope, Ontario, Canada, is one of the oldest Canadian passenger rail stations still in active use. Served by Via Rail trains running from Toronto to Kingston and Ottawa, it was also a stop for trains to and from Montreal until January 24, 2012. The station is unstaffed, but has a heated waiting room, pay telephone, washrooms, free outdoor parking, and wheelchair access.

== History ==
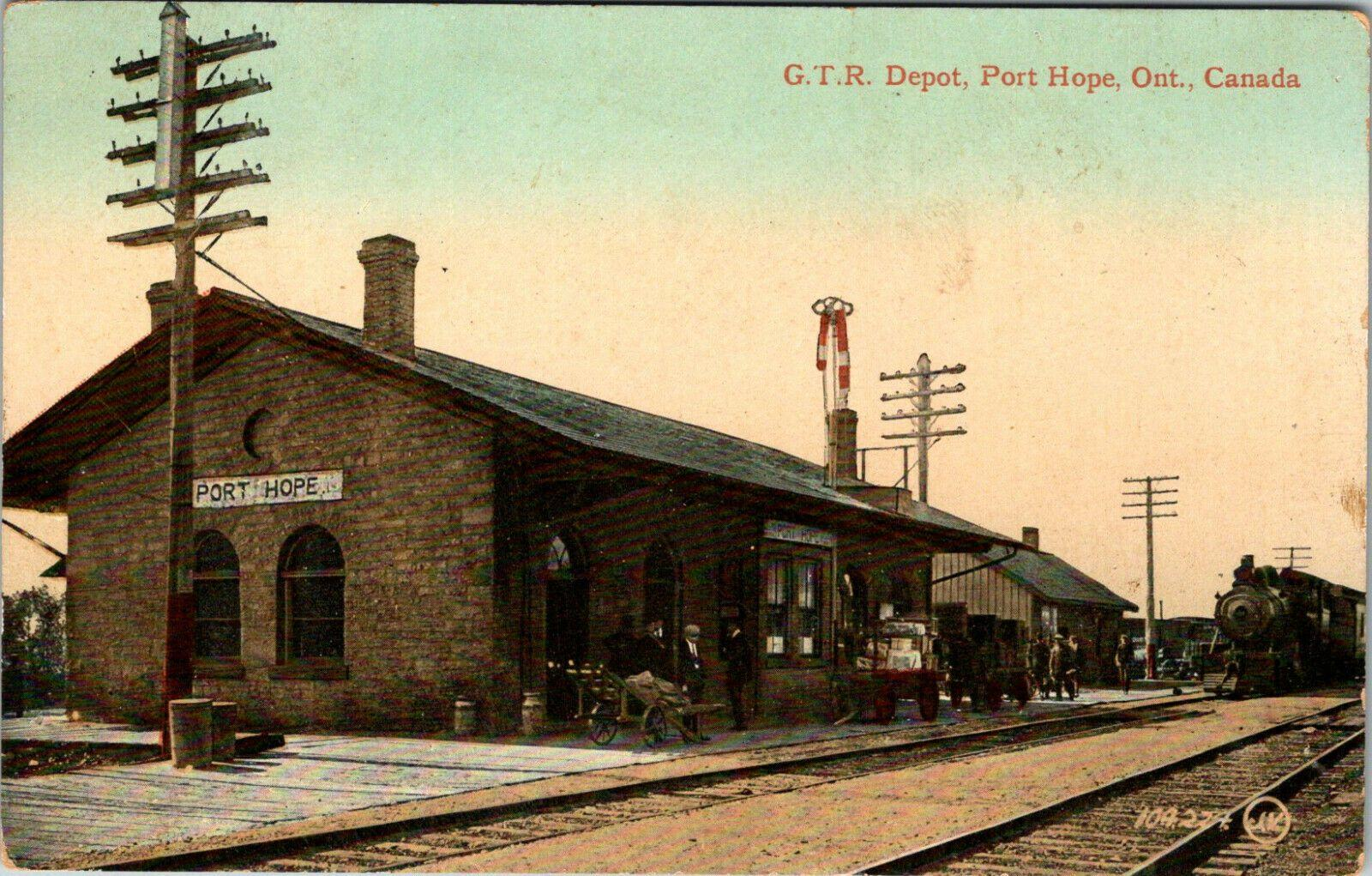
Postcard showing the station, circa 1913

The station, built from local limestone as part of the 1856 Grand Trunk Railway, opened on the October 27, 1856 inauguration of Montreal–Toronto mainline service. Architecturally, its Italianate design is typical of many of the 34 stations originally on the main line. Of the (at most) nine original stations still extant, just Port Hope, Napanee (1856) and Georgetown (1858) remain in active use.

A speculative boom fuelled construction and rail building in the region in the 1850s and 1860s. Port Hope and nearby Cobourg, both small towns, each vied to open a feeder rail line north to Peterborough to promote their respective lake ports. In 1906, both the Midland Railway of Canada and the Grand Trunk Railway had multiple buildings in Port Hope, including freight and car repair facilities, operating several spur lines to the harbour wharves. Much of this infrastructure was redundant as, by 1893, all of the rival companies had been acquired by Grand Trunk. The GTR was ultimately bankrupted by an ill-fated expansion westward and merged into the Canadian National Railway in 1923. Via Rail has operated Canada's federal passenger service since 1978.

A 1978 CN proposal to close or remove Port Hope station drew strong local opposition. Port Hope Town Council obtained a partnership with the Architectural Conservancy of Ontario, the Ontario Heritage Foundation, CN/Via and the province to use public funds and the money CN had earmarked for construction of a new shelter to instead retain and restore the original station to its 1881 appearance, returning it to passenger use. It was designated as a heritage railway station by the Historic Sites and Monuments Board of Parks Canada in 1992, protected under the Heritage Railway Station Protection Act.

In 2009, Via Rail constructed an additional 20 parking spaces at the station; primarily geared towards the regular commuters that use Via Rail service at the station to access the Greater Toronto area.

== Services ==
Port Hope is only served by local trains on Via Rail's Toronto-Ottawa route. Most Toronto-Ottawa trains and all Toronto-Montreal trains pass through the station without stopping.

As of October 2023, the station is served by two or three trains per day toward Ottawa and two trains per day toward Toronto.
