= Georgetown GO Station =

Railway station in Halton Hills, Ontario, Canada

Georgetown
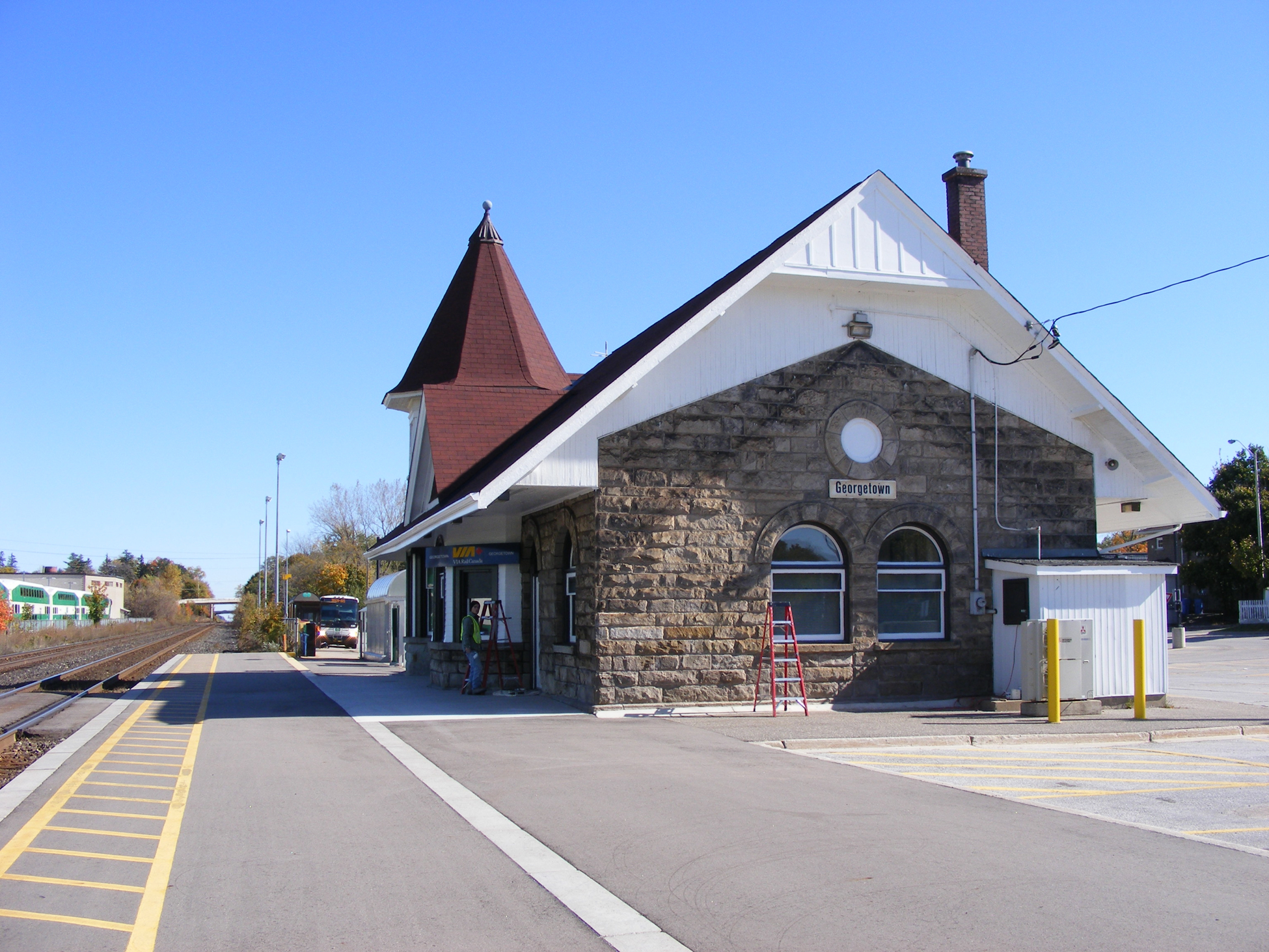

General information
- Location: 55 Queen Street; Georgetown, Ontario; Canada
- Coordinates: 43°39′19″N 79°55′08″W
- Owner: GTR 1856–1923; CNR 1923–1978; Via Rail 1978–present
- Platforms: 2 side platforms
- Tracks: 2
- Bus routes: 31 33

Construction
- Structure type: Shelter; Heritage station building
- Parking: 615 spaces
- Cycle facilities: Yes

Other information
- Station code: GO Transit: GE
- Fare zone: 35

History
- Opened: 1858; 168 years ago

Passengers
- 2018: 589 (daily average) ▼2.8% (GO Transit)

Services
Preceding station	Via Rail	Following station
Guelph toward Sarnia	Sarnia–Toronto	Brampton toward Toronto
Preceding station	GO Transit	Following station
Acton towards Stratford	Kitchener	Mount Pleasant towards Union
Former services
Preceding station	Amtrak	Following station
Guelph toward Chicago	International	Brampton toward Toronto
Preceding station	Canadian National Railway	Following station
Limehouse toward Sarnia	Sarnia – Toronto via Lucan Crossing	Norval toward Toronto
Stewarttown toward Hamilton	Hamilton – Allandale	Terra Cotta toward Allandale

Heritage Railway Station (Canada)
- Designated: 1994
- Reference no.: 4622
Location

Georgetown GO Station is a railway station in Georgetown, a community in the town of Halton Hills, Ontario, Canada. It is served by GO Transit's Kitchener line and Via Rail's Toronto-Sarnia trains. It is located west of Mountainview Road North at 55 Queen Street.

== History ==
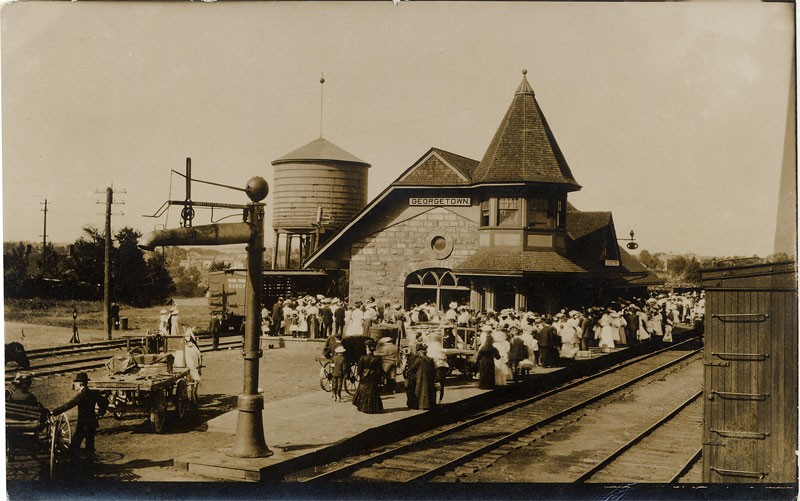
Georgetown GTR station in 1908

The station was constructed between 1855 and 1856 by the Grand Trunk Railway, designed by the GTR chief engineer Francis Thompson and built by Casimir Gzowski. It was enlarged in 1892 and its interior and exterior were remodeled in 1904. Among the 1892 and 1904 modifications were the corner tower and operator's bay window.

The station was acquired by Canadian National Railway when the GTR assets were transferred in 1923 and later became a Via Rail station. GO Transit service began on April 29, 1974, but to platforms built onto a staging yard immediately north of the station and the mainline tracks.

The station once had a water tower for steam trains and had platforms on both sides of the station building, with the south side now paved over for a large commuter parking lot.

The station was the terminus of the then-named Georgetown line for most of its GO Transit history, from 1974 to 1990 and 1993 to 2011. Between 1990 and 1993 and since 2011, some GO Trains have served stations further west; as of 2015 the majority of trains on the line continue to originate and terminate here.

The International Limited was operated jointly by Via Rail and Amtrak between Chicago and Toronto. The service operated from 1982–2004.

== Station facilities ==
The two mainline tracks are used jointly by Canadian National, Via Rail, Goderich-Exeter and GO Transit. On the north side of the station a yard provides four layover tracks and an island platform used for GO Train service. Via trains operate from a side platform on the south side of the station, adjacent to the station building.

The station has two parking lots. The main parking lot and station building are located on the south side of the tracks adjacent to a bus loading/unloading zone.

Ticket sales are available during peak hours with an attendant, as well as during evenings for the last few days of every month.

The station building is open during the posted GO train hours and for a half-hour before each Via train arrival.

== Services ==
=== Train ===
- GO Transit Kitchener line - Kitchener - Toronto: 10 trains in each direction between Georgetown and Toronto, of which 8 eastbound and 7 westbound trains operate the full route from Kitchener to Toronto, and the remainder operate only between Toronto and Georgetown or Guelph.
- Via Rail Corridor Service - Sarnia - London - Kitchener - Toronto: 2 daily trains in each direction, of which one operates the full route between Sarnia and Toronto, and the other operates only between London and Toronto.

=== Bus ===
- GO Bus Route 31 - Guelph - Georgetown - Brampton - Toronto
- GO Bus Route 33 - Guelph - Georgetown - Brampton - Yorkdale - York Mills
- Halton Hills's Activan - for registered clients with a booking

== See also ==
- List of designated heritage railway stations of Canada
