= Durand Union Station =

Train station in Durand, Michigan, USA

Durand, MI
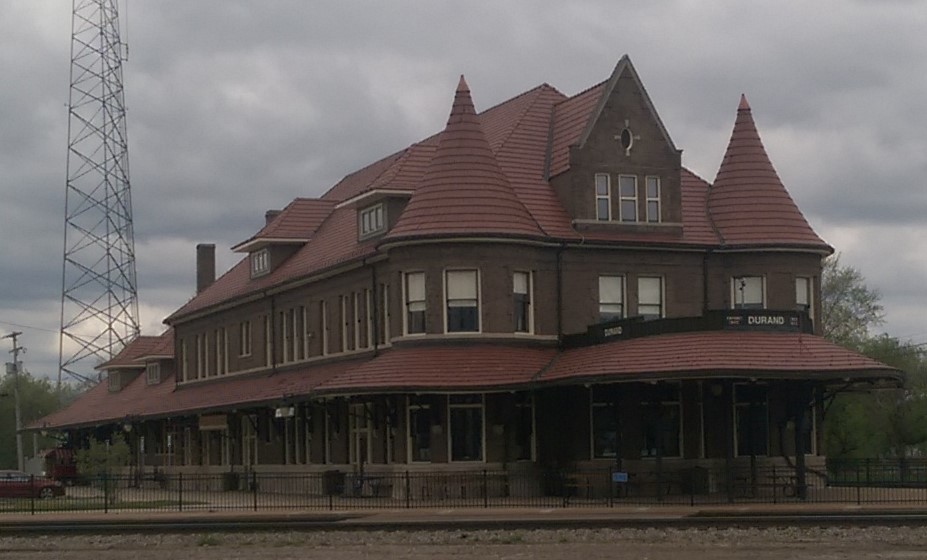

General information
- Location: 200 Railroad Street; Durand, Michigan; United States
- Owner: City of Durand (partially leased by Durand Union Station, Inc.)
- Line: CN Flint Subdivision
- Platforms: 1 side platform
- Tracks: 2

Construction
- Parking: Yes; free

Other information
- Station code: Amtrak: DRD

History
- Opened: 1903

Passengers
- FY 2025: 11,579 (Amtrak)

Services
Preceding station	Amtrak	Following station
East Lansing toward Chicago	Blue Water	Flint toward Port Huron
Former services
Preceding station	Amtrak	Following station
East Lansing toward Chicago	International	Flint toward Toronto
Preceding station	Grand Trunk Western Railroad	Following station
Bancroft toward Chicago	Main Line	Duffield toward Port Huron
Vernon toward Grand Haven	Detroit and Milwaukee Division	Gaines toward Detroit
Lennon toward Oa-at-ka Beach	Cincinnati, Saginaw and Mackinaw Division	Terminus
- Grand Trunk Railway Station
- U.S. National Register of Historic Places
- Michigan State Historic Site
- Interactive map of Grand Trunk Railway Station
- Coordinates: 42°54′33″N 83°58′57″W
- Architect: Grand Trunk Railway Co. of Canada, and Spier and Rohns
- NRHP reference No.: 71000419

Significant dates
- Added to NRHP: May 6, 1971
- Designated MSHS: November 6, 1970
Location

Durand Union Station is a historic train station in Durand, Michigan. The station, which now serves Amtrak Blue Water trains, was originally a busy Grand Trunk Western Railroad and Ann Arbor Railroad hub, as well as a local office for Grand Trunk Western, from its construction in 1903 until 1974. It is currently owned by the city of Durand and partially leased by Durand Union Station, Inc. a nonprofit organization dedicated to the preservation, restoration, and maintenance of the building and its surrounding property.

The building also houses three small railroad history museums: the Michigan Railroad History Museum (which doubles as a gift shop), the Grand Trunk Western Railroad Museum, and the Ann Arbor Railroad History Museum. Also in the building is a model railroad club, the Durand Union Station Model Railroad Engineers and its large layout, and a ballroom for special events and parties.

The station sits at the junction of Canadian National Railway's busy mainline interchange of the Flint and Holly Subdivisions. Additionally, Great Lakes Central Railroad and Huron and Eastern Railway operate near the station, and a freight yard used by all three carriers is located just north of it. It is one of Michigan's most popular locations for railfans to visit, especially during the annual Durand Railroad Days Festival in May. The station was added to the National Register of Historic Places on June 6, 1971, and the Michigan Register of Historic Places in 1987.

In 2017 the station's lessees were attempting to raise $50,000 for building repairs.

== History ==
The station is an important part of railway history in the state. Built in 1903 by the Detroit firm of Spier and Rohns it had a high volume of rail traffic as the Grand Trunk Western and Ann Arbor railroads crossed at that location. It was almost destroyed by fire in 1905, but quickly rebuilt. At its peak, 42 passenger, 22 mail, and 78 freight trains passed through Durand on a daily basis. It serviced almost 3,000 passengers a day.

=== Final years of peak passenger service ===
In July, 1950, the station lost northwest–southeast service with the Ann Arbor Railroad's terminating passenger service, which went from Toledo to Frankfort and Elberta on Lake Michigan. (Elberta was a launch point for ferries north and west across Lake Michigan.)

Into the 1960s the Grand Trunk Western (operating in Canada under the Canadian National Railway) three trains a day operated as part of Chicago – Port Huron – London – Toronto trains: Inter-City Limited, International Limited (only making stops on the eastbound trip), La Salle and Maple Leaf. Until 1960 the Grand Trunk also into ran through trains from Detroit to Grand Rapids and Muskegon, where ferries could be boarded, for travelling across Lake Michigan, to Milwaukee. From Durand passengers could also board Detroit – Bay City mixed trains.

=== Decline ===
In 1971, the Grand Trunk Western terminated its last trains through Durand. These included the International Limited, its Chicago-Detroit Mohawk and an unnamed duplicate itinerary train with that route. In 1974, the GTW decided to close the station due to declining traffic. The historic building was going to be torn down, however, the city of Durand filed for an injunction to stop the demolition and eventually purchased the station in 1979 for $1.00.

Amtrak restored service through the station in 1974 and today Amtrak continues to provide daily intercity passenger rail service on the Blue Water route between Chicago and Port Huron, a remnant of the Grand Trunk service. Baggage cannot be checked at this location; however, up to two suitcases in addition to any "personal items" such as briefcases, purses, laptop bags, and infant equipment are allowed on board as carry-ons. From 1982 to 2004, it was instead served by the modern incarnation of the International Limited, operated jointly by Via Rail and Amtrak between Chicago and Toronto.

== See also ==
- History of railroads in Michigan
- Effingham station - another Amtrak station with similar layouts
