= Capital Area Multimodal Gateway =

Transit station in East Lansing, Michigan, US

East Lansing, MI
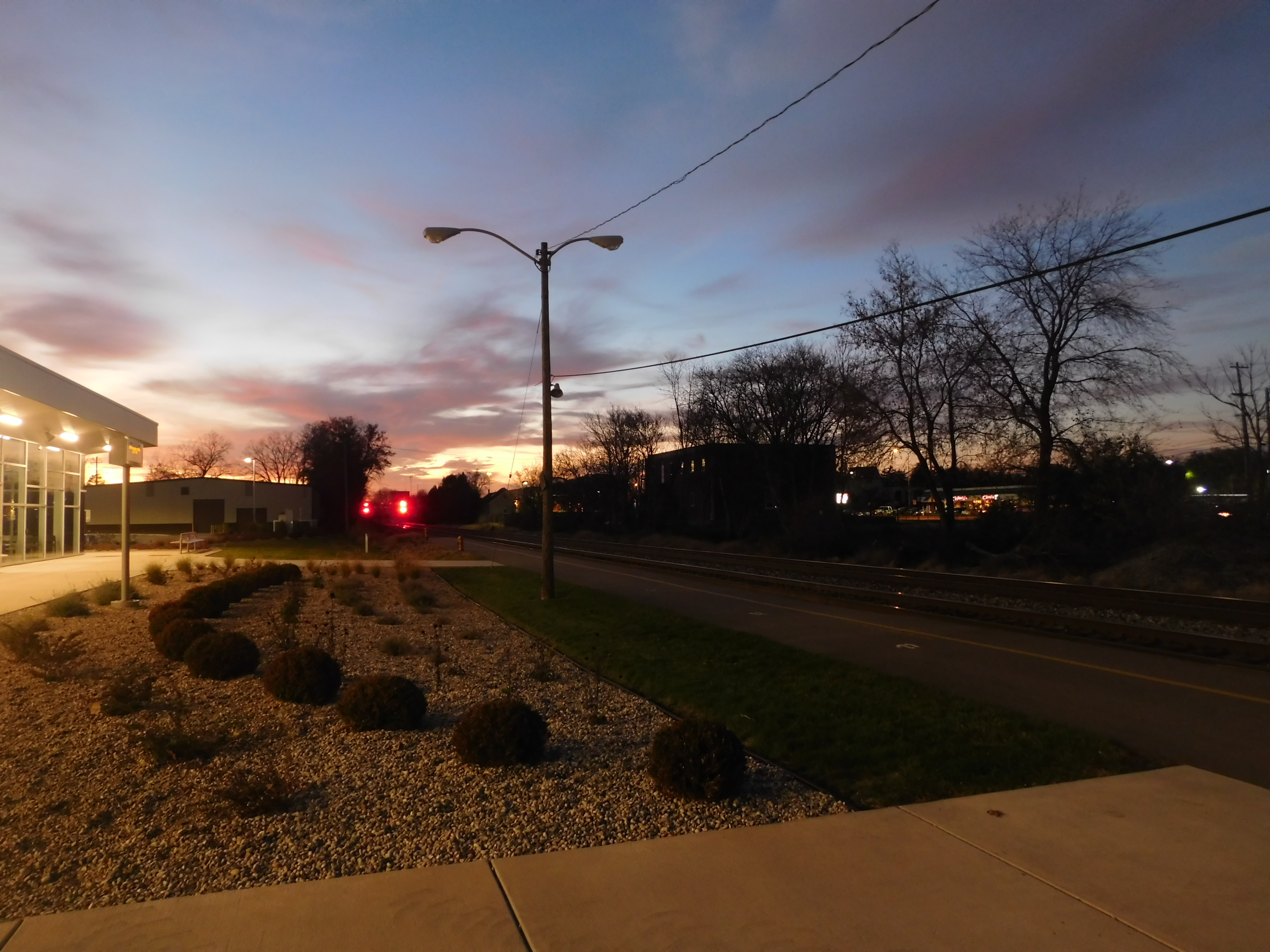
- East Lansing station in November 2016.

General information
- Location: 1240 South Harrison Road; East Lansing, Michigan; United States
- Coordinates: 42°43′09″N 84°29′42″W
- Owner: Michigan State University
- Line: CN Flint Subdivision
- Platforms: 1 side platform
- Tracks: 2
- Bus operators: Amtrak Thruway; Indian Trails
- Connections: Capital Area Transportation Authority

Construction
- Parking: Yes; paid
- Cycle facilities: Racks
- Accessible: Yes

Other information
- Station code: Amtrak: LNS

History
- Opened: 2016

Passengers
- FY 2025: 73,895 (Amtrak)

Services
Preceding station	Amtrak	Following station
Battle Creek toward Chicago	Blue Water	Durand toward Port Huron
Former services
Preceding station	Amtrak	Following station
Battle Creek toward Chicago	International	Durand toward Toronto
Location

Capital Area Multimodal Gateway, also known as East Lansing station, is an intermodal transit station in East Lansing, Michigan. Operated by the Capital Area Transportation Authority (CATA), it is served by Amtrak's Blue Water passenger train, local buses, and intercity buses. It opened in 2015 to replace a nearby Amtrak and bus station operating since 1974.

== Description ==
The 7,300-square-foot (680 m^{2}) station building includes a public waiting area, concessions, Amtrak and intercity bus ticket counters, and public restrooms. There are also three internal vestibules which can be accessed by users during the time the station is unstaffed and closed for the day. Outside are separate covered waiting areas for Amtrak and intercity bus riders, a bike storage area, a customer pick-up and drop-off area, and 150 long-term parking spaces.

== Services ==
Amtrak's Blue Water provides a single daily round-trip between Chicago, Illinois and Port Huron, Michigan. Amtrak Thruway provides a connection to long-distance trains in Toledo, Ohio. Indian Trails, in partnership with Greyhound, offers long-distance bus service to various destinations in Michigan. Megabus served the station from 2013 to 2016.

Local CATA bus routes 20, 35, 39 stop at the station, and the facility also offers taxicab and bike-sharing. The property also has space on its south end of the site along the CSX Plymouth Subdivision to construct an additional platform for future passenger rail services if needed.

== History ==
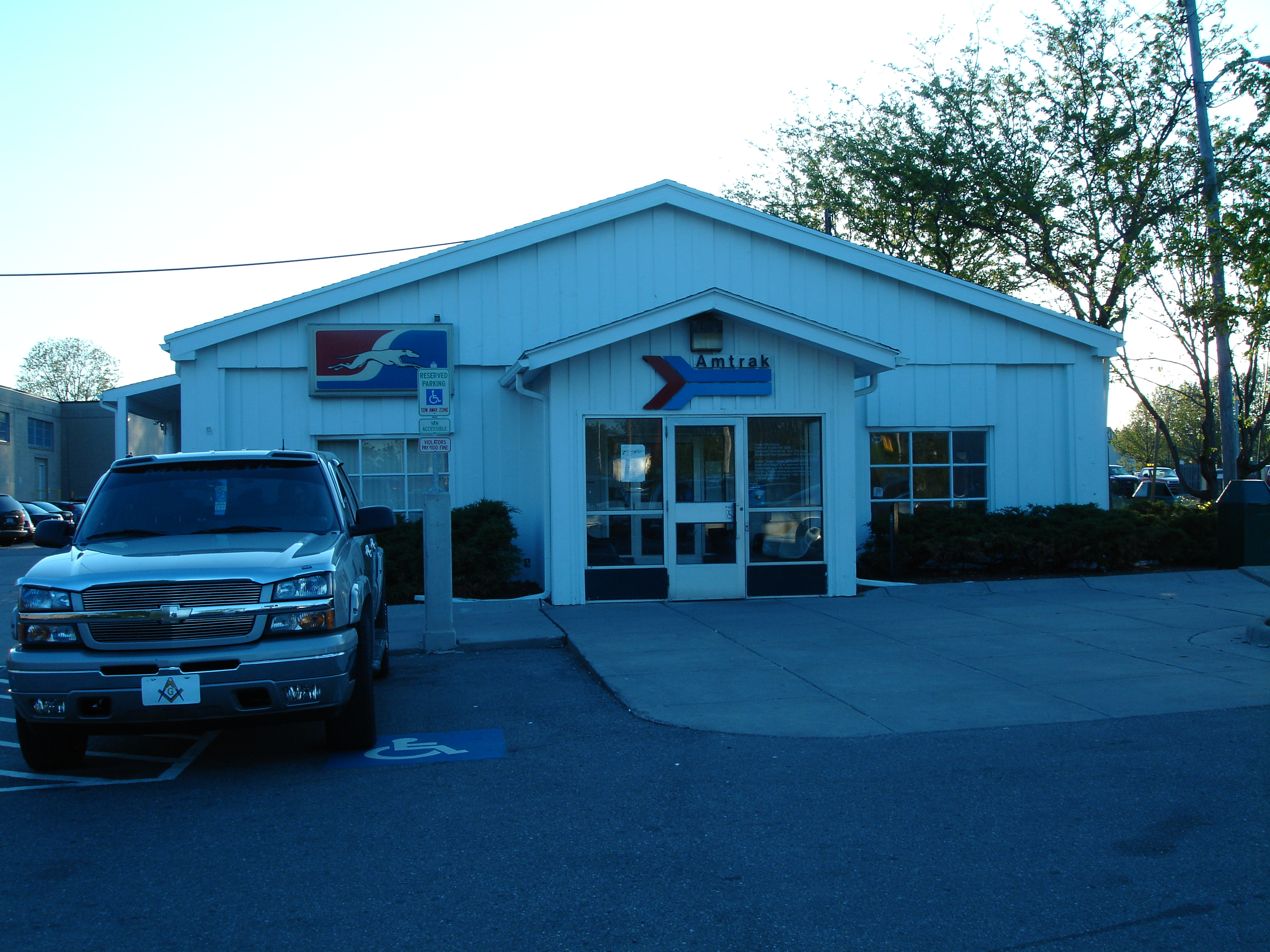
The old station, 2007

Historically, the major railroad depots in the Lansing metropolitan area were the Union Station and the Grand Trunk Western Station, both in Lansing. With the establishment of Amtrak in 1971, both stations lost their train service. Amtrak subsequently took over a building in East Lansing to serve as a station for its planned Blue Water train. This building had been built as a storage facility for Michigan State University in 1971. The Blue Water began servicing this facility on September 15, 1974. The service was renamed the Blue Water Limited on October 26, 1975, and became the International Limited on October 31, 1982, when the eastern terminus was extended to Toronto. The International Limited was operated jointly by Via Rail and Amtrak until it was discontinued in 2004 and replaced with the modern Blue Water line.

Plans for the new station complex, the Capital Area Multimodal Gateway, were announced in 2010, and originally included a new parking structure and improved bus facilities as well as bicycle parking. The project was intended to replace the older Amtrak station with updated facilities, and to consolidated rail and bus service into one intermodal transit station. The project was awarded a $6.3 million grant in July 2012 by the U.S. Department of Transportation's Federal Transit Administration, and by then the parking structure had been dropped from the plan. In addition to the construction costs, CATA paid a $3.2 million long-term lease for the site. The station property also included facilities for intercity bus service. Site work began in late July 2014, and included demolition of the old Michigan State University Surplus Store and Printing Services buildings on-site.

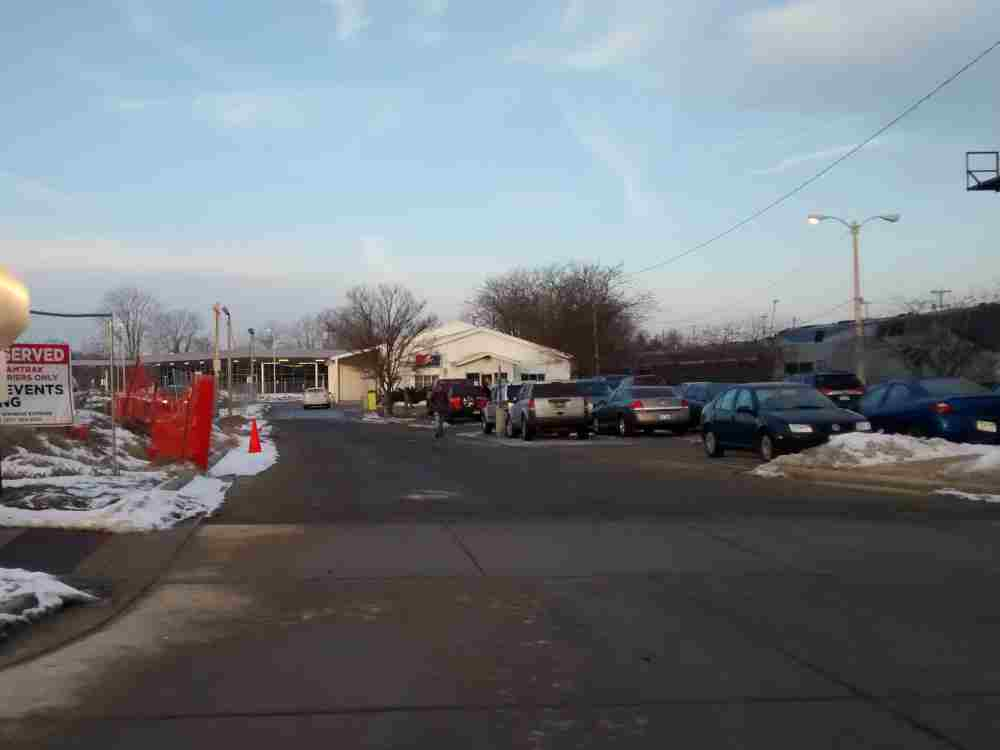
The last train to depart from the old East Lansing Amtrak station waits for passengers to board on January 25, 2016. The new station is in the background behind the old station.

The original station closed after the last train departed on January 25, 2016, and operations moved to the newly built station located a few yards to the west.

== Passenger statistics ==
Passenger Statistics for the East Lansing Amtrak Station (by calendar year)
Year	Total Passengers	% change
2000	27,661	-12.5%
2001	26,216	-5.2%
2002	23,502	-10.4%
2003	22,495	-4.3%
2004	33,404	+48.5%
2005	40,577	+21.5%
2006	45,212	+11.4%
2007	48,025	+6.2%
2008	51,161	+6.5%
2009	51,280	+0.2%
2010	62,241	+21.4%
2011	66,400	+6.7%
2012	64,975	-2.1%
2013	65,894	+1.4%
2014	64,827	-1.6%
2015	64,357	-0.7%
2016	66,321	+3.1%
2017	68,405	+3.1%

== Notable places nearby ==
- Michigan State University
- Lansing, Michigan
- Union Depot

== See also ==
- History of railroads in Michigan
