= National Liberation Party =

National Liberation Party may refer to:

- National Liberation, a political party in Ecuador
- National Liberation Party (Costa Rica)
- National Liberation Party (Gambia), led by Pap Cheyassin Secka
- National Liberation Party of Unity, political party in Indonesia

== See also ==
- National Liberation Front (disambiguation)
- National Liberation Movement (disambiguation)
