= FLN =

The FLN initials may refer to:

== Transportation ==
- FLN Frisia Luftverkehr, German airline
- Flint (Amtrak station), in Michigan
- Flint railway station, in Wales
- Hercílio Luz International Airport in Florianópolis, Brazil

== Other ==
- FLn, the faculty of language in the narrow sense, as hypothesised in Chomskyan Universal grammar
- Family Life Network, American radio network
- Fine Living Network, American television network
- FLN football team, defunct Algerian football team
- Filamin, class of proteins
- Flintshire (historic), historic county in Wales (Chapman code)
- Florianópolis Air Force Base, in Brazil
- Freelancer.com, a crowd-sourcing marketplace
- National Liberation Front (disambiguation) (French: Front de Libération Nationale; Spanish: Frente de Liberación Nacional)
