= Maple Leaf (GTW train) =

American passenger train, 1927–1971

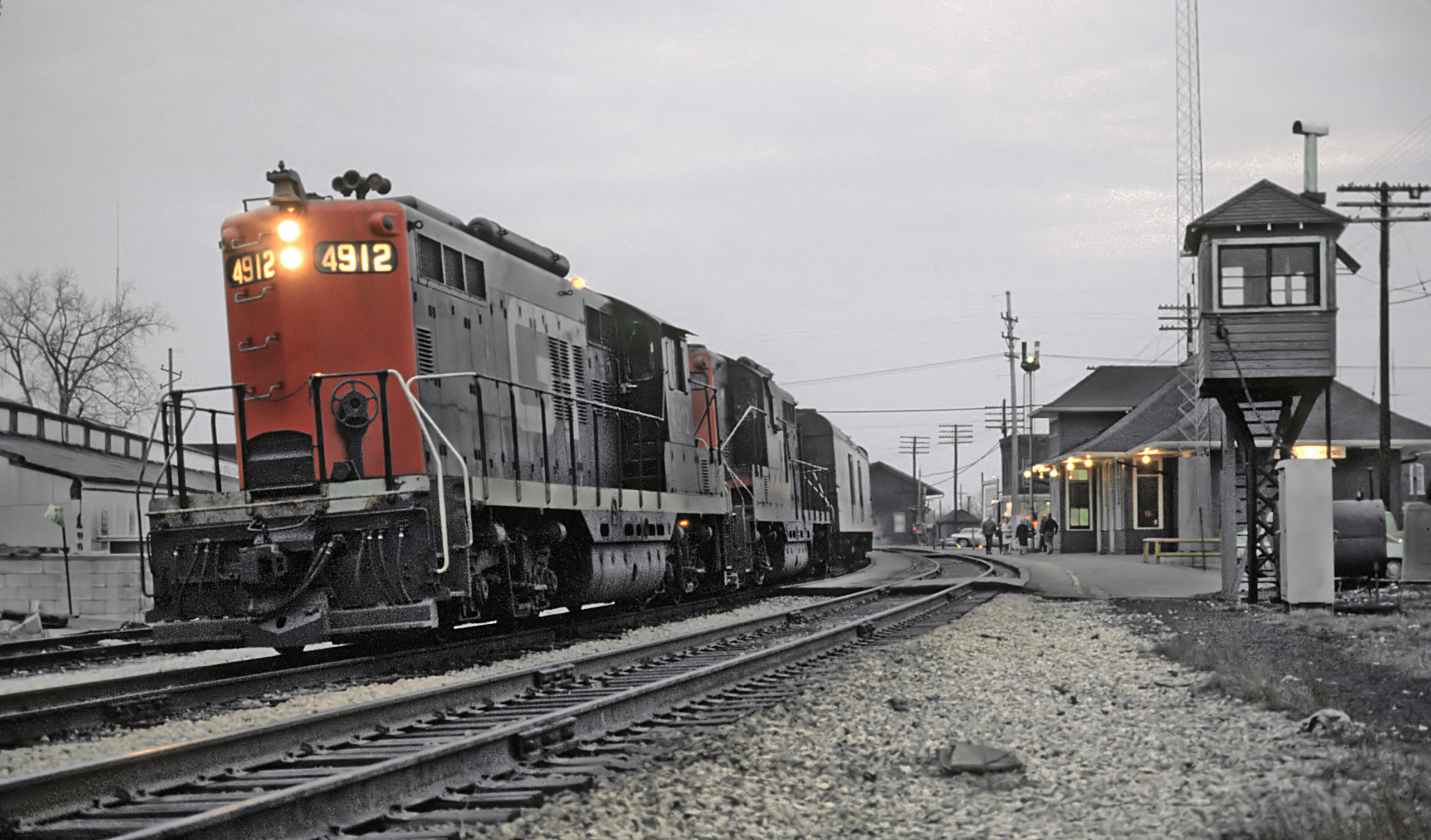
- GTW GP9 4912 with The Maple Leaf, Valparaiso, IN on February 21, 1971

Overview
- Service type: Inter-city rail, Daytime
- Status: Discontinued
- Locale: Midwestern United States/Southern Ontario
- First service: May 15, 1927
- Last service: April 30, 1971
- Former operators: Grand Trunk Western Railroad, Canadian National

Route
- Termini: Chicago, Illinois; Toronto, Ontario
- Stops: 25 (Toronto - Chicago); 24 (Chicago - Toronto)
- Average journey time: 11 hours 22 minutes (Toronto - Chicago); 12 hours 55 minutes (Chicago - Toronto)
- Service frequency: Daily
- Train numbers: 159 (Toronto - Chicago); 158 (Chicago - Toronto)

On-board services
- Class: Coach Class
- Seating arrangements: Club Car seats
- Catering facilities: Meal
- Observation facilities: Lounge car

Technical
- Track gauge: 1,435 mm (4 ft 8 1/2 in)
- Operating speed: 45.5 mph (Toronto - Chicago); 40.1 mph (Chicago - Toronto)

The Maple Leaf was a passenger train pool operated by the Canadian National and the Grand Trunk Western Railroad ("Grand Trunk") between Chicago, Illinois and Toronto, Ontario. It operated from 1927 to 1971. The train took its name from the maple leaf, the national symbol of Canada. The Maple Leaf was one of many trains discontinued when Amtrak began operations in 1971, and is unrelated to the Maple Leaf which Amtrak now operates between Toronto and New York City. The train operated on Canadian National railroad territory through Ontario, but west of Lake Huron it operated via Grand Trunk Railroad.

== History ==
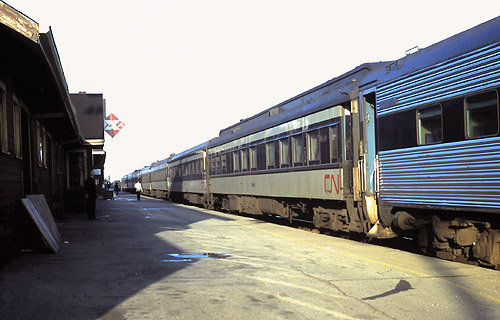
The Maple Leaf at Port Huron in 1970

The Grand Trunk introduced the Maple Leaf on May 15, 1927. The train operated on an overnight schedule between Chicago and Montreal, Quebec. In 1932 it began carrying a through sleeper for New York. In May 1937 the Grand Trunk renamed the westbound Maple Leaf the La Salle. The eastbound Maple Leaf was known as the New York Maple Leaf between 1938 and 1939. The name Toronto Maple Leaf was briefly applied to a Chicago–Port Huron, Michigan train in 1938. In 1938 the New York Maple Leaf was one of several Grand Trunk trains to receive Class U-4-b 4-8-4 steam locomotives built by the Lima Locomotive Works.

The Maple Leaf operated on a daytime schedule between Chicago and Toronto in the 1950s. It carried a Chicago–Montreal through sleeper, a Chicago–Detroit through coach, a Port Huron–Toronto cafe/parlor car, parlor cars, and coaches. A dining car operated between Chicago and Lansing, Michigan. The Montreal sleeper ended in 1958.

Beginning in 1961, the Maple Leaf went via the more populous cities of Kitchener and Guelph, whereas it had previously taken a route via Brantford and Hamilton for the trip between London and Toronto. By October 1963 the similar itinerary train, the Inter-City Limited had followed suit for its westbound trip.

In 1966 the Grand Trunk renamed the westbound Inter-City Limited the Maple Leaf, thus making the Maple Leaf a daytime round-trip between Chicago and Toronto. After the truncation of the International Limited to Port Huron on June 23, 1970, the Maple Leaf was the Grand Trunk train on the Chicago–Toronto route. Amtrak discontinued all remaining Grand Trunk trains when it began operations in 1971. Service over the Grand Trunk resumed on September 15, 1974, with the introduction of the Blue Water Limited.

== Major station stops ==
(** for cities served beginning in 1961)

- Chicago, Illinois: Dearborn Station
- South Bend, Indiana: Union Station
- Battle Creek, Michigan:
- Lansing, Michigan: GTW Depot
- Durand, Michigan: Union Station
- Port Huron, Michigan:
- London, Ontario: London Station
- Kitchener, Ontario: Kitchener station**
- Guelph, Ontario: Guelph Central Station**
- Toronto, Ontario: Union Station
