= Flint station (Michigan) =

Railway station in Michigan

Flint, MI
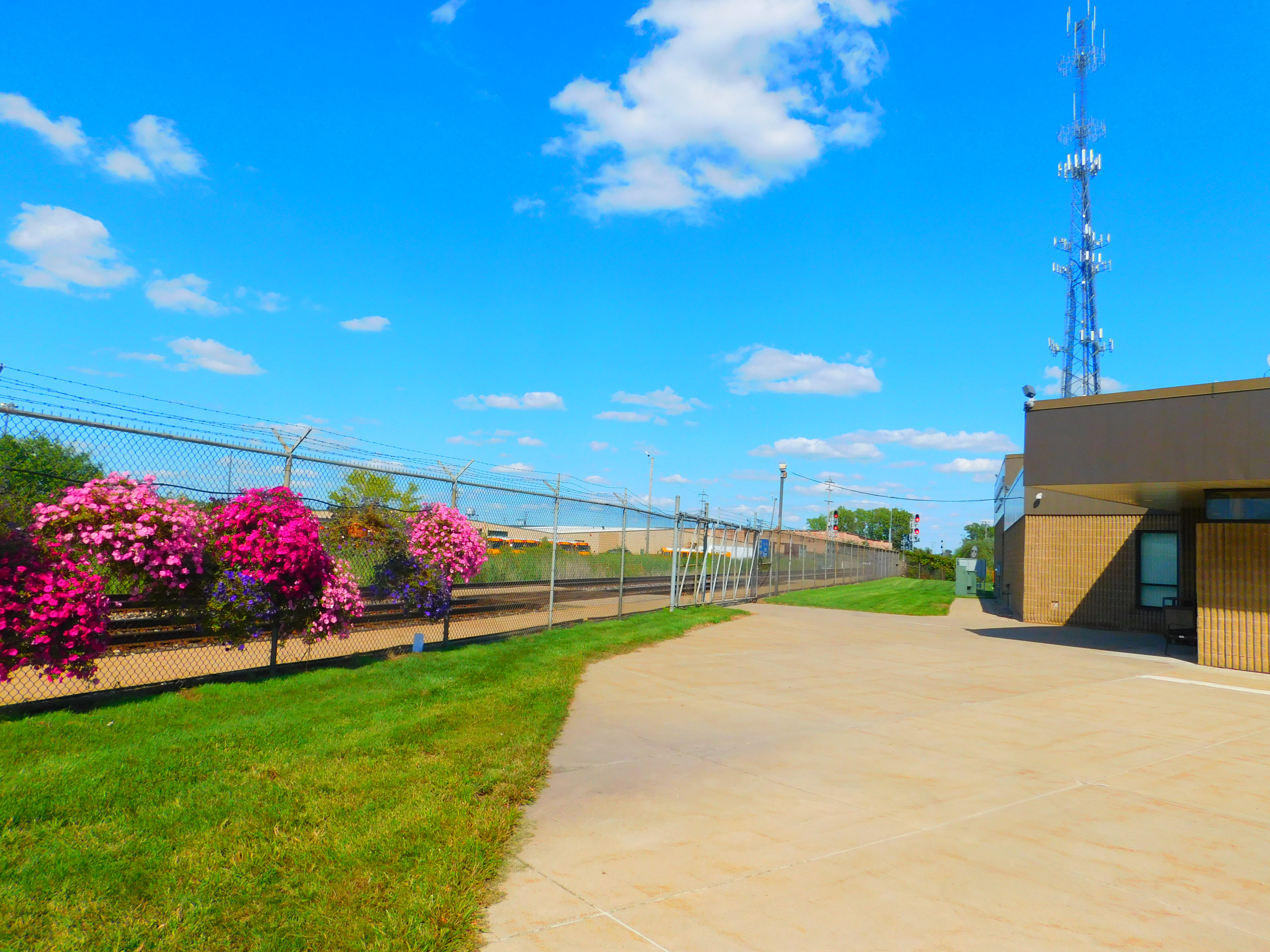
- Flint station platform in September 2016.

General information
- Location: 1407 South Dort Highway; Flint, Michigan; United States
- Coordinates: 43°00′56″N 83°39′05″W
- Owner: Flint Mass Transportation Authority
- Line: CN Flint Subdivision
- Platforms: 1 side platform
- Tracks: 2
- Bus stands: 5
- Bus operators: Amtrak Thruway; Indian Trails; Flint MTA

Construction
- Parking: Yes; free
- Accessible: Yes

Other information
- Station code: Amtrak: FLN

History
- Opened: 1989

Passengers
- FY 2025: 27,858 (Amtrak)

Services
Preceding station	Amtrak	Following station
Durand toward Chicago	Blue Water	Lapeer toward Port Huron
Former services
Preceding station	Amtrak	Following station
Durand toward Chicago	International	Lapeer toward Toronto
Preceding station	Grand Trunk Western Railroad	Following station
Torrey toward Chicago	Main Line	Belsay toward Port Huron
Location

Flint station is an inter-modal transportation center in Flint, Michigan. It is served by Amtrak's Blue Water route, and doubles as the intercity bus station for Amtrak Thruway and Indian Trails, as well as the local city bus service, the Flint Mass Transportation Authority, who owns the station. The station was built as part of the Amtrak Standard Stations Program.

== History ==
This is at least the fourth station along the Grand Trunk Western Railroad (GTW) line through Flint. The railroad line that now hosts the Blue Water arrived from Port Huron in 1871 and originally a wooden structure served as the passenger station. A permanent stone and brick station replaced it in 1905, but was moved to Muskegon in 1927. The third GTW depot, located at 120 East 14th Street near Downtown Flint, was used by Amtrak until 1989 and demolished thereafter. The current station on M-54 (Dort Highway) provides easy access to I-69.

From 1982–2004, the station was served by the International Limited, which was operated jointly by Via Rail and Amtrak and ran between Chicago and Toronto.

== See also ==
- History of railroads in Michigan
