= Ejército de Liberación Nacional (disambiguation) =

The Ejército de Liberación Nacional is an armed group involved in the continuing Colombian armed conflict, active since 1964.

Ejército de Liberación Nacional may also refer to:

- Ñancahuazú Guerrilla, a guerilla group active in the Cordillera Province, Bolivia from 1966 to 1967
- National Liberation Army (Peru), a guerilla group active in 1965

== See also ==
- National Liberation Army (disambiguation)
