= Blue Water (train) =

Amtrak service between Chicago, IL and Port Huron, MI

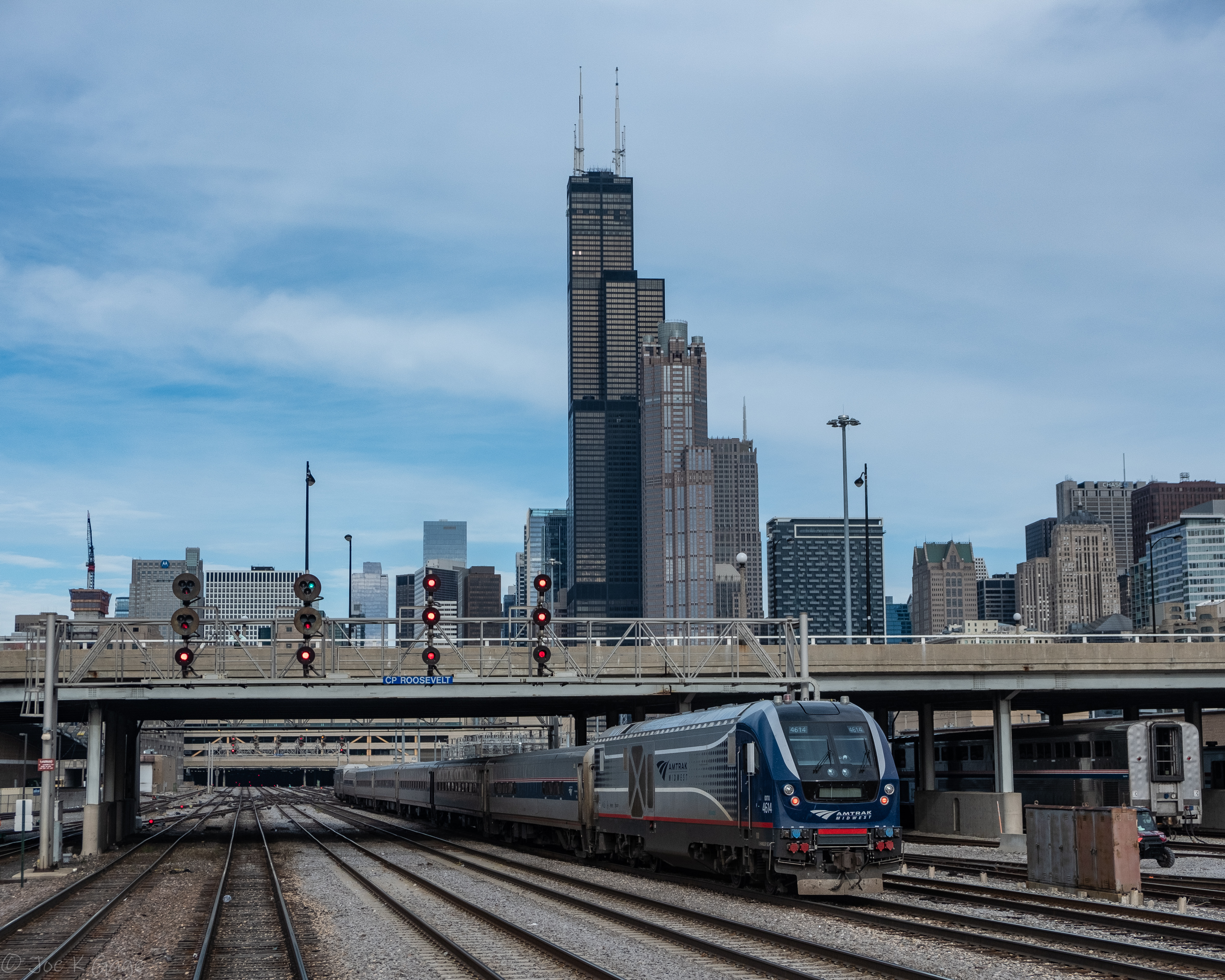
- The westbound, double-ended Blue Water approaching Chicago in 2020

Overview
- Service type: Inter-city rail, higher-speed rail
- Predecessor: International
- First service: April 25, 2004
- Current operator: Amtrak
- Annual ridership: 177,739 (FY 25) ▲1.6% (Note: Amtrak's Fiscal Year (FY) runs from October 1 of the prior year to September 30 of the named year.)

Route
- Termini: Chicago, Illinois; Port Huron, Michigan
- Stops: 11
- Distance travelled: 319 miles (513 km)
- Average journey time: 6 hours, 25 minutes (Port Huron to Chicago); 6 hours, 31 minutes(Chicago to Port Huron)
- Service frequency: Daily
- Train numbers: 364 (eastbound); 365 (westbound)

Technical
- Track gauge: 4 ft 8 1/2 in (1,435 mm) standard gauge
- Operating speed: 49 mph (79 km/h) (avg.); 110 mph (180 km/h) (top)
- Track owners: CN, Amtrak, MDOT, NS

The Blue Water (previously the Blue Water Limited) is a higher-speed passenger train service operated by Amtrak as part of its Michigan Services. The 319-mile (513 km) route runs from Chicago, Illinois, to Port Huron in Michigan's Blue Water Area, for which the train is named. Major stops are in Kalamazoo, Battle Creek, East Lansing, and Flint.

Amtrak began running the Blue Water in 1974 over the Grand Trunk Western Railroad. In 1982 the train was extended from Port Huron to Toronto, Canada, and renamed the International Limited. Service was cut back to the original route in 2004 with the Blue Water name restored.

== History ==
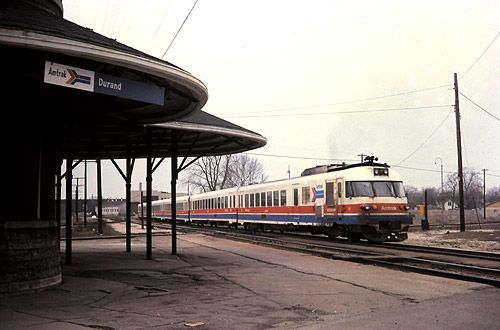
The Blue Water Limited with a Turboliner trainset at Durand in 1979

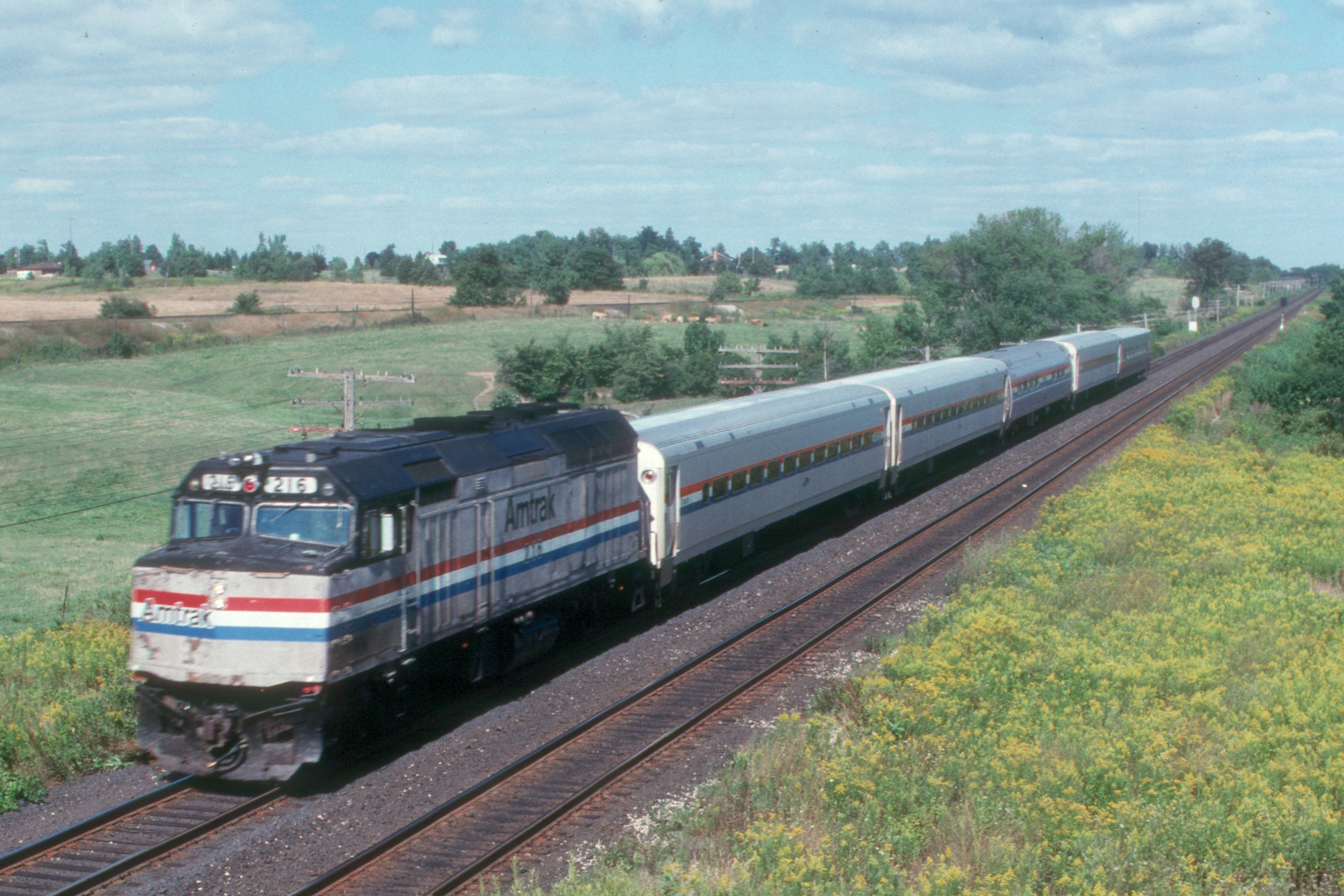
The International in 1989

The Lansing area, home of the Michigan state capitol and Michigan State University, was left out of Amtrak's original system. Beginning in 1973, Amtrak and the state discussed restoring service over the Grand Trunk Western Railway within the state, although the new route would join Amtrak's other Michigan trains on the Penn Central west of Battle Creek, Michigan, eschewing the Grand Trunk's traditional route to Chicago. New stations were built in Port Huron and East Lansing, and the state spent $1 million on track rehabilitation (equivalent to $6.53 million in 2025 adjusted for inflation). Service began September 13, 1974, between Chicago and Port Huron, with the intention of eventually restoring the Port Huron–Toronto leg.

Amtrak renamed the train the Blue Water Limited on October 26, 1975, and re-equipped it with French-built Turboliner trainsets on May 20, 1976. The new Turboliners were capable of, but never reached, 125 mph (201 km/h) and ran with fixed five-car consists with an overall capacity of 292 passengers. The Turboliners were withdrawn on October 25, 1981, replaced by conventional locomotives pulling Amfleet coaches.

The long-discussed extension to Toronto finally occurred on October 31, 1982. The extended service received the name International Limited, the name of an old Canadian National/Grand Trunk Chicago–Port Huron–Montreal train (1900–1907, 1919–1971). Amtrak and Via Rail, the independent Canadian Crown corporation rail company, jointly operated the International Limited (later just International) until April 25, 2004, when cross-border service was discontinued. Massive border delays post-September 11 led to falling ridership; Amtrak and Michigan agreed to truncate service at Port Huron and bring back the old Blue Water. On the Canadian side service ends at Sarnia as part of the Via Rail's Corridor route.

With a more favorable intrastate schedule and fewer delays, the Blue Water's ridership showed immediate improvements, carrying 94,378 passengers in fiscal year 2004 (compared to 80,890 in FY 2003). Blue Water ridership in FY 2011 totaled 187,065, an increase of 18.0 percent from FY 2010's total of 157,709, and the highest total ever recorded by the train. During FY 2011, the train had a total revenue of $5.8 million, a 22.3 percent increase from FY 2010's total of $4.7 million.

The Detroit–Chicago corridor has been designated by the Federal Railroad Administration as a high-speed rail corridor. A 97-mile (156 km) stretch along the route of Blue Water from Porter, Indiana to Kalamazoo, Michigan is the longest segment of track owned by Amtrak outside of the Northeast Corridor. Amtrak began speed increases along this stretch in January 2002. Ultimately, speed increased to 110 mph (180 km/h). On-time performance increased from about 45% in 2019 to about 70% in 2025.

== Route details ==
The Blue Water operates over Norfolk Southern Railway, Amtrak, and Grand Trunk Western Railroad trackage:

- NS Chicago Line, Chicago to Porter, Indiana
- Amtrak Chicago–Detroit Line, Porter, Indiana, to Kalamazoo, Michigan
- MDOT Michigan Line, Kalamazoo, Michigan, to Battle Creek, Michigan
- CN/GTW Flint Subdivision, Battle Creek, Michigan, to Port Huron, Michigan

Geographic route map

=== Station stops ===
State	Town/City	Station	Connections
Illinois	Chicago	Chicago	Amtrak (long-distance): California Zephyr, Cardinal, City of New Orleans, Empire Builder, Floridian, Lake Shore Limited, Southwest Chief, Texas Eagle; Amtrak (intercity): Borealis, Hiawatha, Illini and Saluki, Illinois Zephyr and Carl Sandburg, Lincoln Service, Pere Marquette, Wolverine; Metra: BNSF, Heritage Corridor, Milwaukee District North, Milwaukee District West, North Central Service, SouthWest Service; Chicago "L": Blue (at Clinton), Brown Orange Pink Purple (at Quincy); CTA Bus, Pace Bus; Megabus
Michigan	New Buffalo	New Buffalo	Amtrak: Wolverine; Berrien Bus
Michigan	Niles	Niles	Amtrak: Wolverine; Niles Dial-A-Ride (DART)
Michigan	Dowagiac	Dowagiac	Amtrak: Wolverine; Dowagiac Dial-A-Ride (DART)
Michigan	Kalamazoo	Kalamazoo	Amtrak: Wolverine; Metro Transit; Intercity bus: Greyhound, Indian Trails
Michigan	Battle Creek	Battle Creek	Amtrak: Wolverine, Amtrak Thruway; Battle Creek Transit; Greyhound
Michigan	East Lansing	East Lansing	Amtrak: Amtrak Thruway; Capital Area Transportation Authority; Intercity bus: Greyhound, Indian Trails
Michigan	Durand	Durand	Shiawassee Area Transportation Agency
Michigan	Flint	Flint	Amtrak: Amtrak Thruway; MTA Bus; Intercity bus: Greyhound, Indian Trails
Michigan	Lapeer	Lapeer	Greater Lapeer Transportation Authority (GLTA)
Michigan	Port Huron	Port Huron	Blue Water Area Transit

== Consist ==
As of 2025, a typical Amtrak Blue Water consists of:

- 2 Siemens SC-44 Charger locomotives
- Five or six Venture coaches
- One or two Venture cafe/business cars
