= LPE =

LPE may refer to:

- Lambda Pi Eta, a collegiate honor society
- the ICAO code for LAN Perú, the flag carrier airline in Peru, now LATAM Airlines Perú
- Lapeer (Amtrak station), a train station
- LimeWire Pirate Edition, file sharing software
- Lingenfelter Performance Engineering, a car modifier
- Liquid phase epitaxy, a semiconductor manufacturing process
- Liquid phase exfoliation, a method of processing chemical solutions
- Lone pair electrons, an atomic valence structure
- Local privilege escalation, a type of software exploit
- London Press Exchange, an advertising agency, merged with the Leo Burnett agency in 1969
- Louisiana Purchase Exposition, the 1904 World's Fair in St. Louis, Missouri, to celebrate the centennial of the 1803 Louisiana Purchase
- Lysophosphatidylethanolamine, a type of organic chemical
- Longitude of the periapsis, a dimension of orbit
- Lepki language, of Western New Guinea
