= Australia Asia Worker Links =

AAWL
- Australia Asia Worker Links
- Founded: 1979
- Headquarters: Melbourne, Victoria
- Location: Australia
- Website: Archived August 6, 2025, at the Wayback Machine

Australia Asia Worker Links (AAWL) is an Australian non-government organisation active since 1979, established to forge international labour movement links in the Asia-Pacific region. Its office is in the Victorian Trades Hall Council building in Melbourne, Australia.

AAWL produces print and web-based publications aimed at union members and union activists. The fortnightly news service Mini News is sent to subscribers by email. The AAWL newsletter Asian Workers Organising is distributed in print form to members and union affiliates and is available from the AAWL website. AAWL has a weekly radio program called Asia Pacific Currents on Melbourne Radio 3CR. The program provides news updates and interviews on labour news in the region. The program is nationally and internationally syndicated and podcasts are available.

According to AAWL, materials developed by AAWL have been widely used by labour movement activists in the Asia Pacific region include the workshop documents promoting organising for health & safety through the use of body mapping and the proposed Global Labour Movement Charter.

AAWL has conducted solidarity exchanges and study tours with many countries including Bangladesh, China, East Timor, Fiji, Hong Kong, India, Indonesia, Japan, Malaysia, Nepal, Pakistan, Papua New Guinea, Philippines, Solomon Islands, South Korea, Sri Lanka, Thailand, Vietnam.

AAWL advocates for fairer treatment of workers throughout the Asia Pacific region and globally. AAWL activities to support workers' rights include who have been jailed for their union organising activities. Activists supported by AAWL have included Dita Sari and Muchtar Pakpahan from Indonesia, Tian Chua from Malaysia, Colombian unionist Liliany Obando, Iranian unionist Mansour Osanloo, Korean unionist Han Sang Kyun and Indian doctor Binayak Sen.
