= Lapeer station =

Railway station in Michigan

Lapeer, MI
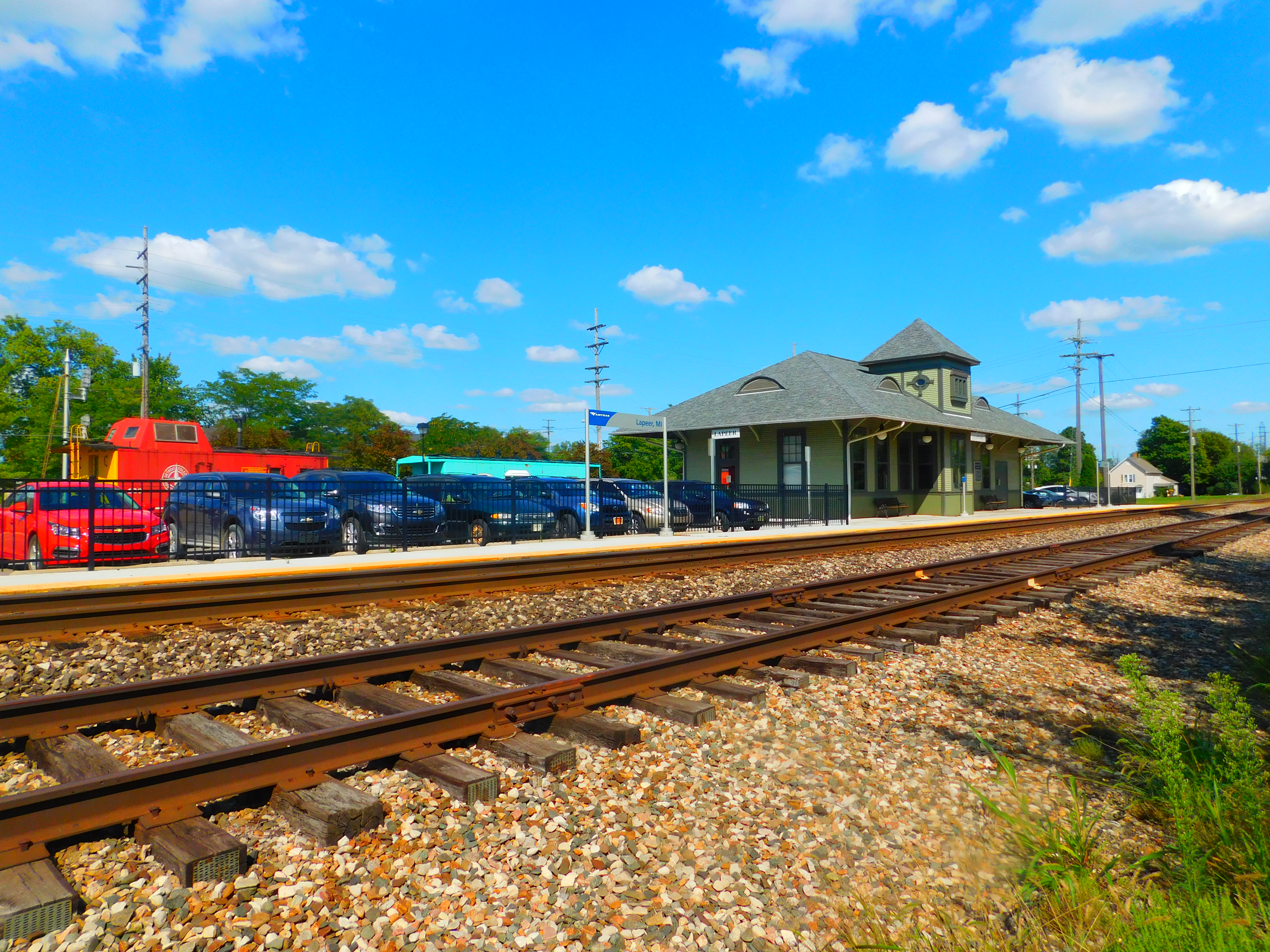
- Lapeer station in September 2016

General information
- Location: 73 Howard Street; Lapeer, Michigan; United States
- Coordinates: 43°02′58″N 83°18′22″W
- Line: CN Flint Subdivision
- Platforms: 1 side platform
- Tracks: 2

Construction
- Parking: Yes

Other information
- Station code: Amtrak: LPE

History
- Opened: 1900
- Rebuilt: 1991, 2004

Passengers
- FY 2025: 8,261 (Amtrak)

Services
Preceding station	Amtrak	Following station
Flint toward Chicago	Blue Water	Port Huron Terminus
Former services
Preceding station	Amtrak	Following station
Flint toward Chicago	International	Port Huron toward Toronto
Preceding station	Grand Trunk Western Railroad	Following station
Elba toward Chicago	Main Line	Atlica toward Port Huron
Location

Lapeer station is an Amtrak station in Lapeer, Michigan currently served by the Blue Water. The station was originally built in the early 1900s by the Grand Trunk Western Railroad, and renovated by Amtrak and the Michigan Department of Transportation in 1991 and completely restored in 2004. Another station in Lapeer formerly served the Michigan Central Railroad, but is now the office for an insurance company. The Amtrak station sits at a former junction of the GTW and MCRR lines, the latter of which is mostly removed, with the remaining piece now used by Lapeer Industrial Railroad.

From 1982–2004, the station was served by the International Limited, which was operated jointly by Via Rail and Amtrak and ran between Chicago and Toronto.

== See also ==
- History of railroads in Michigan
