= Flint station =

Flint station may refer to:

- Flint station (Michigan), Flint, Michigan, United States
- Flint railway station, Flint, Wales, United Kingdom
