= Dita Indah Sari =

Indonesian trade unionist

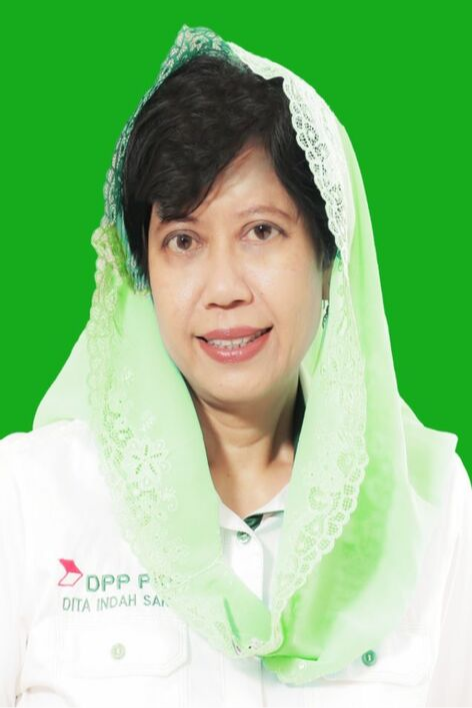
- Born: 30 December 1972 (age 53); Medan, North Sumatra, Indonesia
- Occupations: Trade unionist, social activist

Dita Indah Sari (born 30 December 1972) is an Indonesian trade union and socialist activist. As a human rights campaigner during the Suharto regime, she was sentenced to five years' imprisonment in 1996 on the charge of sedition. During her imprisonment, she was named a prisoner of conscience by Amnesty International.

After her release in 1999 she was elected chairperson by the Congress of the National Front for Indonesian Workers Struggle (FNPBI). She was awarded the 2001 Ramon Magsaysay Award for Emergent Leadership. Politically she is the leader of the PRD, a socialist party within the broader Papernas alliance. In 2025 she was made commissioner of state owned, PT InJourney Airports.
