= National Liberation Movement =

A national liberation movement is an organization engaged in a war of national liberation.

National Liberation Movement may refer to:

- Movement of National Liberation, a leftist party founded by former Mexican President Lázaro Cárdenas
- National Liberation Movement (Albania), a communist World War II group
- National Liberation Movement (France), a World War II group
- National Liberation Movement (Ghana) a pre-independence group
- National Liberation Movement (Guatemala), an anti-communist political party, close the Guatemalan military
- National Liberation Movement (Panama), Panamanian political party
- National Liberation Movement (Russia), Russian political movement
- National Liberation Movement (St Vincent), Vincentian political party
- National Liberation Movement (Upper Volta), Banned political party in Burkina Faso
- Basque National Liberation Movement
- Venetian National Liberation Movement
- The Tupamaros, a Uruguayan left-wing militant group
- The Yugoslav Partisans during World War II

== See also ==
- National Liberation Front (disambiguation)
- National Liberation Party (disambiguation)
