= Port Huron station =

Rail station in Port Huron, Michigan

Port Huron, MI
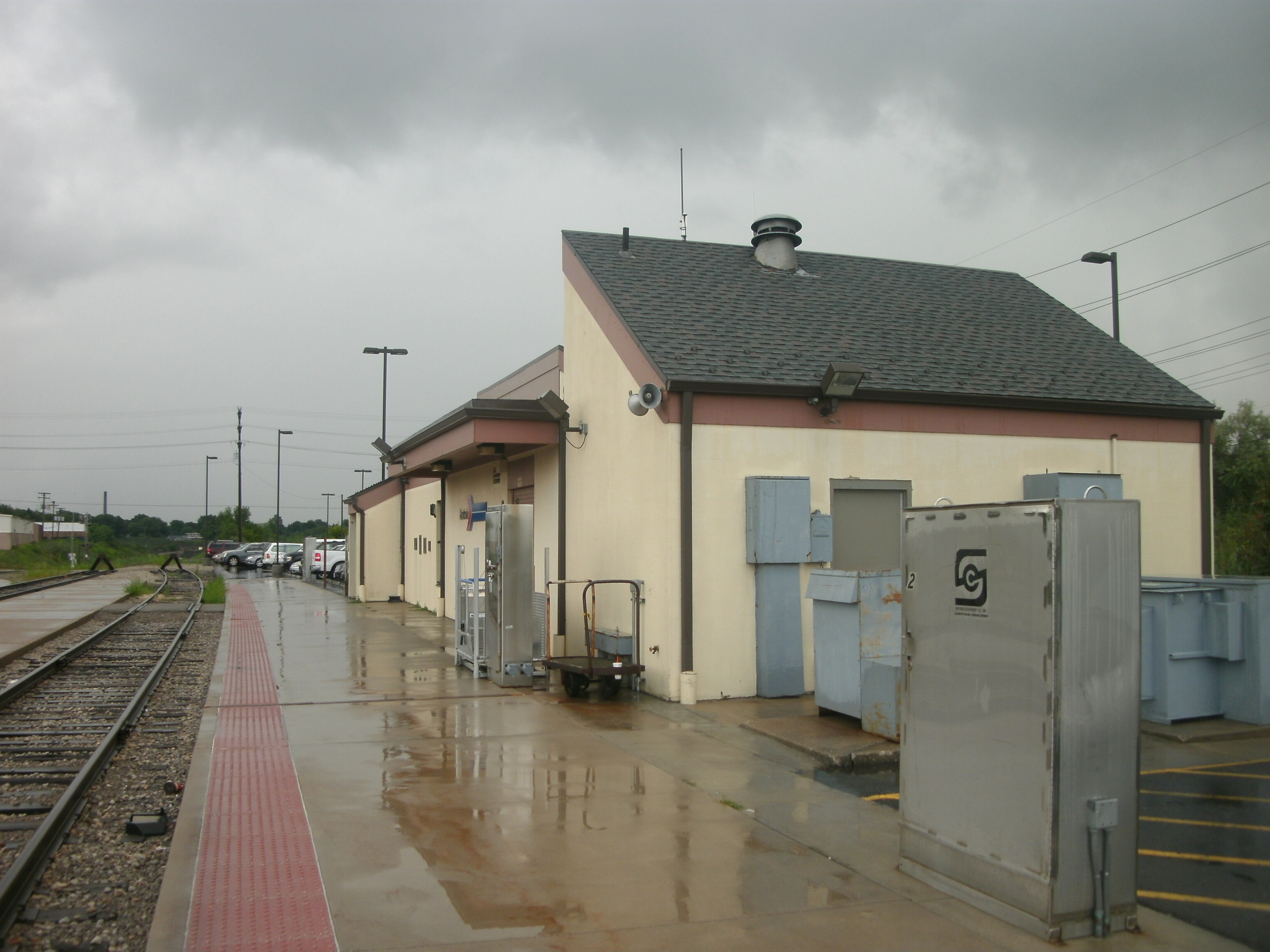
- Port Huron station in August 2012.

General information
- Location: 2223 16th Street; Port Huron, Michigan; United States
- Coordinates: 42°57′38″N 82°26′38″W
- Owner: Amtrak
- Line: CN Flint Subdivision
- Platforms: 1 side and 1 island platform
- Tracks: 2
- Connections: BWAT: 3, 5

Construction
- Parking: Yes
- Accessible: Yes

Other information
- Station code: Amtrak: PTH

History
- Opened: 1979

Passengers
- FY 2025: 13,555 (Amtrak)

Services
Preceding station	Amtrak	Following station
Lapeer toward Chicago	Blue Water	Terminus
Former services
Preceding station	Amtrak	Following station
Lapeer toward Chicago	International	Sarnia toward Toronto
Location

Port Huron station is an Amtrak station in Port Huron, Michigan, and the eastern terminus of the Blue Water. The current station opened in 1979. It sits six blocks west of the St. Clair Tunnel, but the passenger tracks now terminate here and only freight tracks bypass the station and continue to Canada. Port Huron is the division point between the Flint Subdivision to Battle Creek, Michigan, and the Strathroy Subdivision to London, Ontario.

The station was formerly served by the International Limited, which was operated jointly by Via Rail and Amtrak between Chicago and Toronto. The service, which had started in 1982, was discontinued in 2004. The Port Huron station had contained a United States Immigration Office while it served the International Limited.

== See also ==
- History of railroads in Michigan
