= Mass Transportation Authority (Flint) =

Public transit operator serving Flint, Michigan

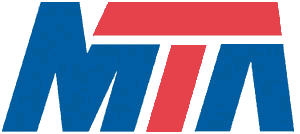

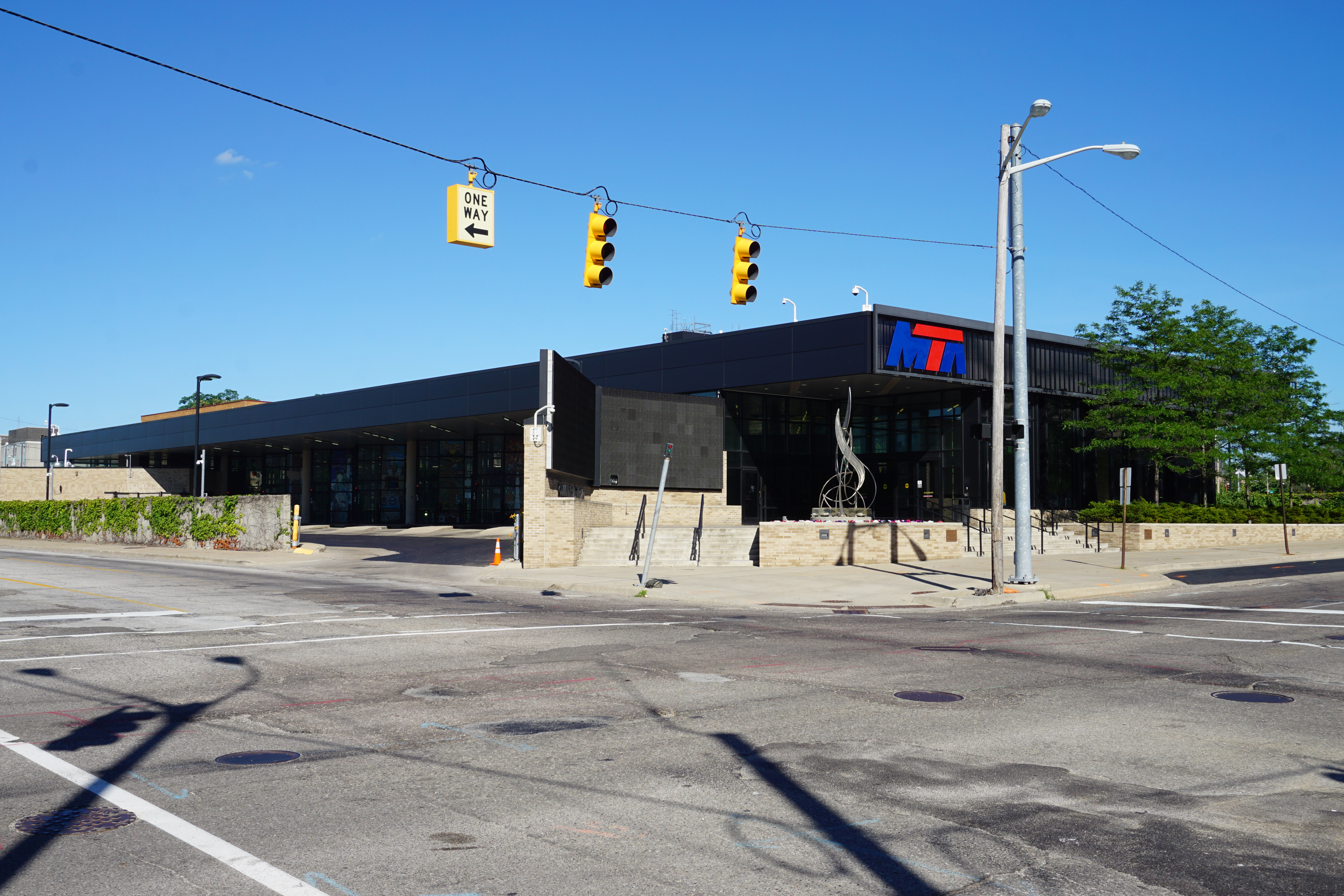
- MTA Transit Center in Downtown Flint
- Founded: 1972
- Headquarters: 1401 S. Dort Hwy. Flint, Michigan
- Locale: Flint, Michigan
- Service area: Genesee County, Michigan
- Service type: Bus service Paratransit
- Routes: 14
- Hubs: Downtown Transportation Center; 615 Harrison St. Flint, MI
- Stations: Flint station
- Daily ridership: 16,000 (Q2 2017)
- Fuel type: Diesel; Hydrogen fuel cell Propane; Compressed natural gas
- Chief executive: Ed Benning
- Website: http://mtaflint.org

The Mass Transportation Authority (MTA) is the public transit operator serving Flint, Michigan and surrounding Genesee County. It also owns and operates the inter-modal Flint station, which also serves Amtrak and Indian Trails.

== History ==
Service began in 1972, with the fleet consisting of 26 buses serving the city of Flint with 14 routes and hourly service.

=== Upgrades and expansions ===
Since 2009, the MTA has made several upgrades and expansions to its fleet and facilities.

The Flint MTA received a $7.985 million grant from the Federal Transit Administration that was funded by the American Recovery and Reinvestment Act of 2009 for new Project 25 digital radio dispatch equipment and mobile data terminals, new intelligent transportation system software and equipment, preventive maintenance, and the purchase and installation of new signage and security equipment.

Starting in October 2012, the MTA began refurbishing 36 of its buses, extending their lives by 6–8 years. On the same day, they announced their board of directors approved a $4.2 million deal to purchase 60 propane powered mini-buses that replaced the diesel-engine vans used by Your Ride.

The MTA purchased an additional 35 propane-powered mini-buses for their Your Ride service, nearly doubling their previous fleet, starting in the spring of 2013. The report also said the MTA Your Ride service purchased another 62 mini-buses in fall 2014, for a grand total of 160 vehicles.

In September 2016, the MTA received a $15 million grant ($12.8 million from the Federal Transit Administration and $2.2 million from the Michigan Department of Transportation) that were used to buy 32 compressed natural gas buses. They replaced some buses that were 20 years old and had over 600,000 miles on them. Some of the money was used to train mechanics and drivers in conjunction with a workforce training development program at Baker College of Flint.

The MTA made upgrades to its Davison service center on M-15 (N. State Rd.) in the summer of 2017.

The MTA purchased the former Baker College Center for Transportation Technology complex at Dort Highway and I-69 for $1 million in the fall of 2018. It will be used to house its Ride to Wellness vehicles. Other buildings on the grounds will be used for bus driver training, a school-to-work program for mechanics training, and vehicle storage and maintenance.

In November 2019, the MTA received a $4.3 million grant from the U.S. Department of Transportation to purchase new buses and refurbish their older buses.

In August 2022, MTA received a $4.3 million grant to add more hydrogen fuel cell buses and improve the fueling station in Grand Blanc.

== Services ==
=== Local fixed routes ===
Fourteen standard, all-day routes are provided within the city of Flint and its inner suburbs, as well as nine peak hour services (which feature different numbers for each variation of the route). Most routes begin at the MTA Service Center in downtown Flint.

Unless otherwise noted, all local routes run every 30 minutes on weekdays and hourly on weekends. Each route (except 3) takes roughly one hour to complete a round trip.

| # | Route Name | Termini | | Notes | | | | |
|---|---|---|---|---|---|---|---|---|
| # | Route Name | Termini | | Notes | 1 | North Saginaw | Downtown | N Saginaw St at Mount Morris Town Center Plaza |
| 2 | M.L. King Avenue | Beecher Plaza | | | | | Downtown | |
| 3 | Miller-Linden | ALDI, W Pierson Rd | | | | | Downtown | |
| 4 | Civic Park | Hallwood Plaza | | | | | Downtown | |
| 5 | Dupont | Hallwood Plaza | | | | | Downtown | |
| 6 | Lewis-Selby | Stanley Rd + Rosewood Dr | hourly service on weekdays | | | | Downtown | |
| 7 | Franklin | Carpenter Rd + Bray Rd | | | | | Downtown | |
| 8 | South Saginaw | Ascension Genesys Hospital Grand Mall | weekday runs alternate termini from 8am-6pm; weekend service runs only to Genesys | | | | Downtown | |
| 9 | Lapeer Road | Meijer, Center Rd | | | | | Downtown | |
| 10 | Richfield Road | Richfield Rd + Covert Rd | services Flint Amtrak station on special request only | | | | Downtown | |
| 11 | Fenton Road | South Flint Plaza | services Bishop International Airport | | | | Downtown | |
| 12 | Beecher-Corunna | Mill Rd + Beecher Rd | | | | | Downtown | |
| 13 | Crosstown North | Carpenter Rd + Energy Dr | ALDI, W Pierson Rd | hourly service on weekdays | | | | |
| 15 | Dort-Averill | Downtown | Walmart, Belsay Rd | hourly service on weekdays; no weekend service | | | | |

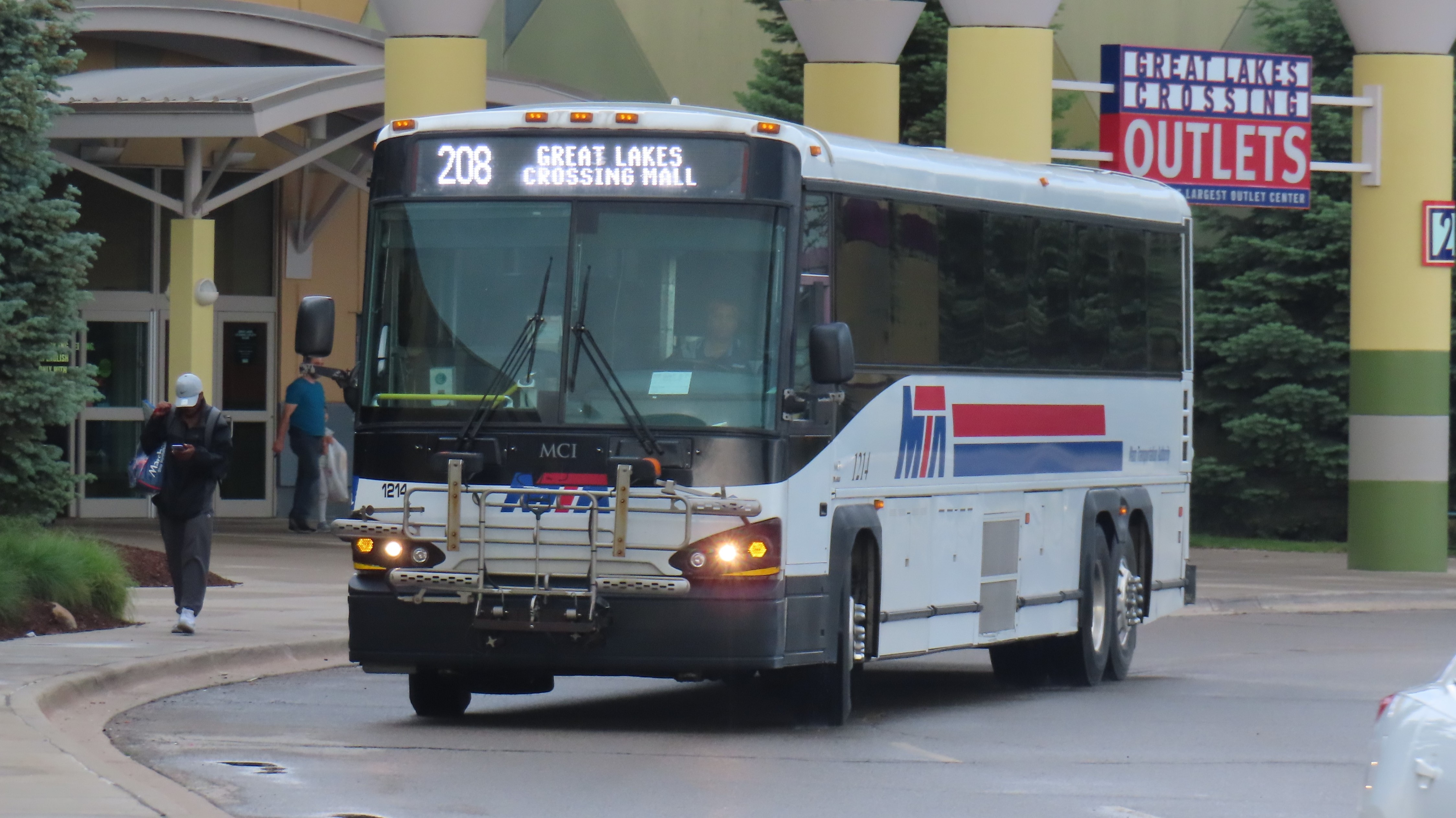
MTA Regional coach at Great Lakes Crossing Outlets in Auburn Hills

=== Regional routes ===
The MTA operates an hourly intercity route between downtown Flint and Great Lakes Crossing Outlets in Auburn Hills, which links the system to Metro Detroit and its SMART network. The system also includes intercity bus routes from Flint to Brighton and Howell.

==== Proposed ====
Since January 2014, the MTA has been attempting to secure government funding to provide intercity service between Bay City and Detroit.

=== Dial-a-ride ===
The MTA also operates Your Ride, a mini-bus service for special needs customers.

In 2015, the MTA partnered with Genesys Health System's Program of All-Inclusive Care for the Elderly (PACE) to provide transportation services for eligible citizens.

Your Ride also has special services called Ride to Groceries, Ride to Wellness, and Ride to Worship.

The Federal Transit Administration awarded the MTA a $310,040 grant to support the Ride to Wellness Initiative in September 2016. The Flint Jewish Federation donated $40,000 to the MTA to support the Ride to Wellness Initiative in March 2017. It received another grant for $734,752 for the program from the United States Department of Transportation in May 2019.

The Michigan Department of Transportation announced the MTA was awarded a $603,500 Michigan Mobility grant for the Vets for Wellness in October 2018.

The MTA Flint Trolley is back until October 2019. The trolley provides rides to the Flint Farmers’ Market from the downtown Flint area every 15 minutes from 8 a.m. to 5 p.m. on Tuesday, Thursday and Saturday. Residents interested in riding the trolley can be picked up at the following sites: University of Michigan-Flint “S” Lot, Northbank Center, Churchhills, Flint Farmers’ Market, Third Street and Wallenberg, Saginaw and Second streets, University of Michigan-Flint Pavilion and Soggy Bottom Bar.

== Northrup-Abrams Transportation Center ==
The Northrup-Abrams Transportation Center, located at 615 Harrison Street, is the primary transfer hub for the MTA. The facility provides an indoor waiting area for passengers in the heart of downtown Flint. It was rededicated to honor two former MTA boardmembers in 2021.

== Fleet ==
The total MTA fleet includes 283 in service vehicles with 3 hydrogen fuel cell vehicles,143 propane vehicles, and 5 hybrid diesel or gasoline/electric. Fixed routes use a mix of Gillig Low Floor and New Flyer Xcelsior buses(Being phased out), while regional routes are run with MCI D4500CT units.

== See also ==
- List of bus transit systems in the United States
- Flint station
