= Capital Area Transportation Authority =

Public transit operator in Michigan, US

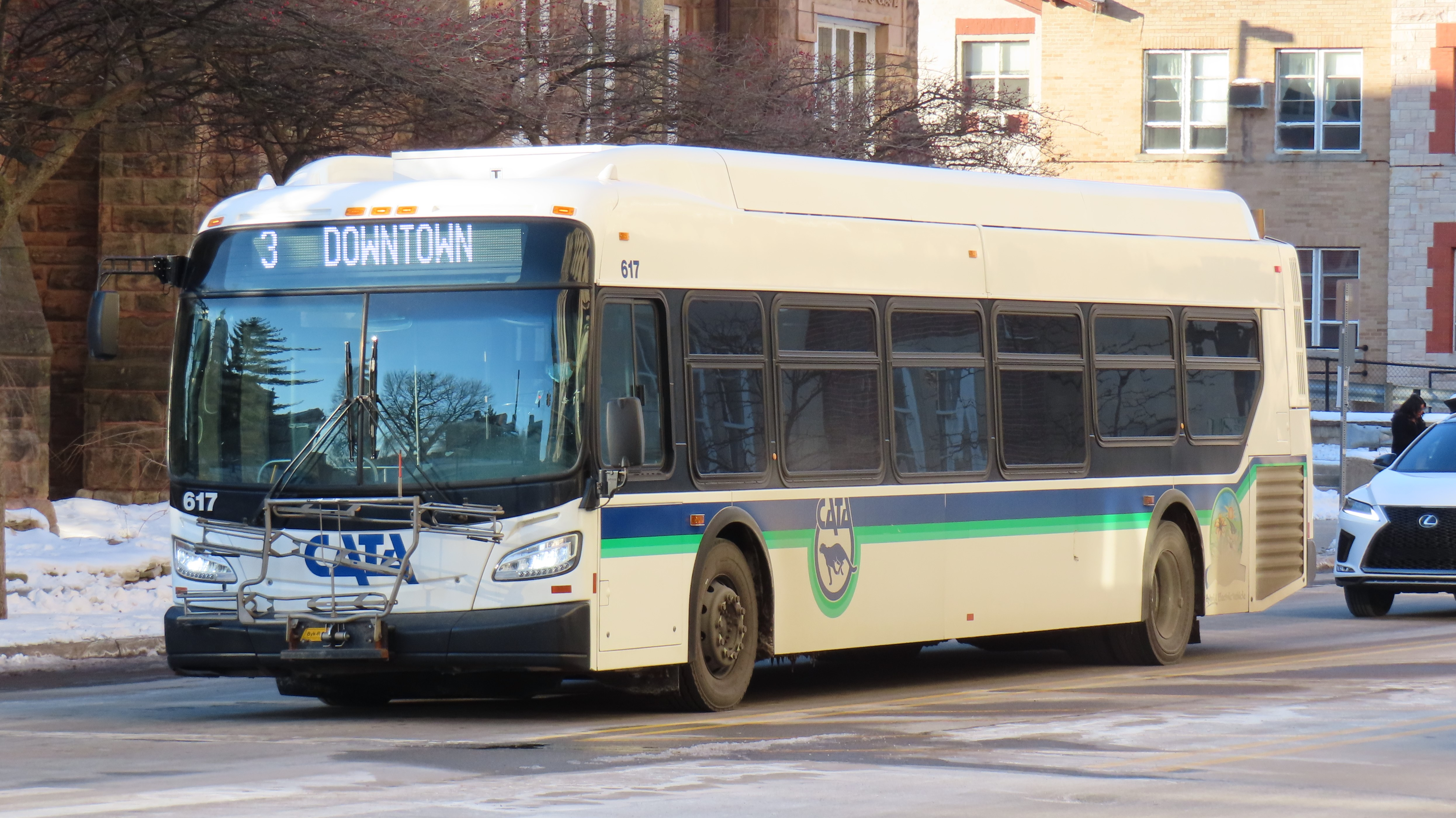
- CATA bus in Downtown Lansing
- Founded: 1972
- Headquarters: 4615 Tranter Street
- Locale: Lansing, Michigan
- Service type: bus service, express bus service, paratransit
- Routes: 32
- Stops: 1,350
- Hubs: CATA Transportation Center (CTC); MSU-CATA Transportation Center (MSU-CTC)
- Fleet: 122 buses 52 small buses 55 low floor vans
- Daily ridership: 24,200 (weekdays, Q2 2026)
- Annual ridership: 9,634,900 (2025)
- Fuel type: Diesel; Diesel-electric hybrid
- Chief executive: Bradley T. Funkhouser, AICP
- Website: cata.org

The Capital Area Transportation Authority (CATA) is the public transit operator serving the Lansing, Michigan area, including service on the campus of Michigan State University. In 2025, the system had a ridership of 9,634,900.

== History ==
CATA began service in 1972. Its predecessor, Lansing Metro Lines, was privately owned and operated under a franchise from the city of Lansing. Poor ridership and increasing costs prompted a city buyout of Metro Lines in 1970, creating uncertainty about the future of bus service in the Lansing area. CATA was organized as a regional authority in 1971. By the end of its first year of service in 1972, the newly formed CATA had provided over 700,000 rides.

CATA was the first transit system in the United States to operate electric buses, with the assistance of a grant from the Model Cities Program. Six electric buses entered service in May 1973, operating a loop through Downtown Lansing and the State Capitol at no charge. The electric buses were built by the Battronic Truck Company of Boyertown, Pennsylvania. The $136,000 (equivalent to $986,000 in 2025) purchase price of the buses was largely funded by the federal government. CATA's electric buses were plagued by mechanical problems, and ridership declined after CATA began charging fares on the formerly free service. The electric buses were withdrawn in September 1974, and were sold to an industrial parts supplier in Flint at a substantial discount.

In 1999, Michigan State University discontinued its bus services, and CATA took over operations of bus service on campus. Fares were initially charged for these routes, before a 2019 pilot program led to a permanent removal of fares.

CATA is a two-time winner of the APTA Outstanding Public Transportation System Award, in 1991 and 2007. This award recognizes CATA's excellence in customer service, safety, and management.

In 2006, CATA became the first transit agency in Michigan to operate diesel-electric hybrid buses. The system continued to exclusively buy hybrid buses through 2016, before returning to conventional diesel in 2019 as the first Michigan operator of the Nova Bus LFS.

In August 2014, CATA introduced the CATAnow system to provide real-time bus departure information. Further developments in CATA's real-time bus tracking systems include a partnership with Transit App beginning in 2017.

=== Michigan/Grand River Avenue Transportation Study ===
CATA partnered with metropolitan municipalities beginning in the summer of 2009 to study and evaluate transit improvements to Route 1, which runs from downtown Lansing to the Meridian Mall. Improvements being evaluated include enhancing the existing bus system, adding bike lanes, improving intersections, or upgrading the existing route from a bus line to a bus rapid transit line, light rail, or a modern streetcar line. The CATA Board of Directors formally adopted bus rapid transit as the locally preferred alternative for the corridor on February 16, 2011. This authorized the transit to submit an application to be part of the Federal Transit Administration Small Starts program, which would provide substantial funding for the capital costs of construction this line. The proposal was moved to the FTA's project development phase in April 2013, which includes getting funding for an environmental review and design and engineering activities. Citing a potential lack of federal funding for the project from the Trump administration, the authority's board voted in April 2017 to suspend the project until federal funding could be committed to the project.

== Operations ==
CATA operates scheduled fixed-route bus and paratransit services across a 559-square-mile (1,450 km^{2}) area throughout Ingham County and portions of Eaton and Clinton counties.

CATA has approximately 340 employees, of whom nearly 224 are bus operators represented by Amalgamated Transit Union Local 1039. In 2016, 46% of CATA's operating revenue came from local sources, another 30% from state sources, and 24% came from fares and additional sources. In fiscal 2019, CATA logged 11,049,317 rides – an increase of 6.4 percent over the previous fiscal year.

CATA also operates the Capital Area Multimodal Gateway in East Lansing, the Lansing area's sole Amtrak station.

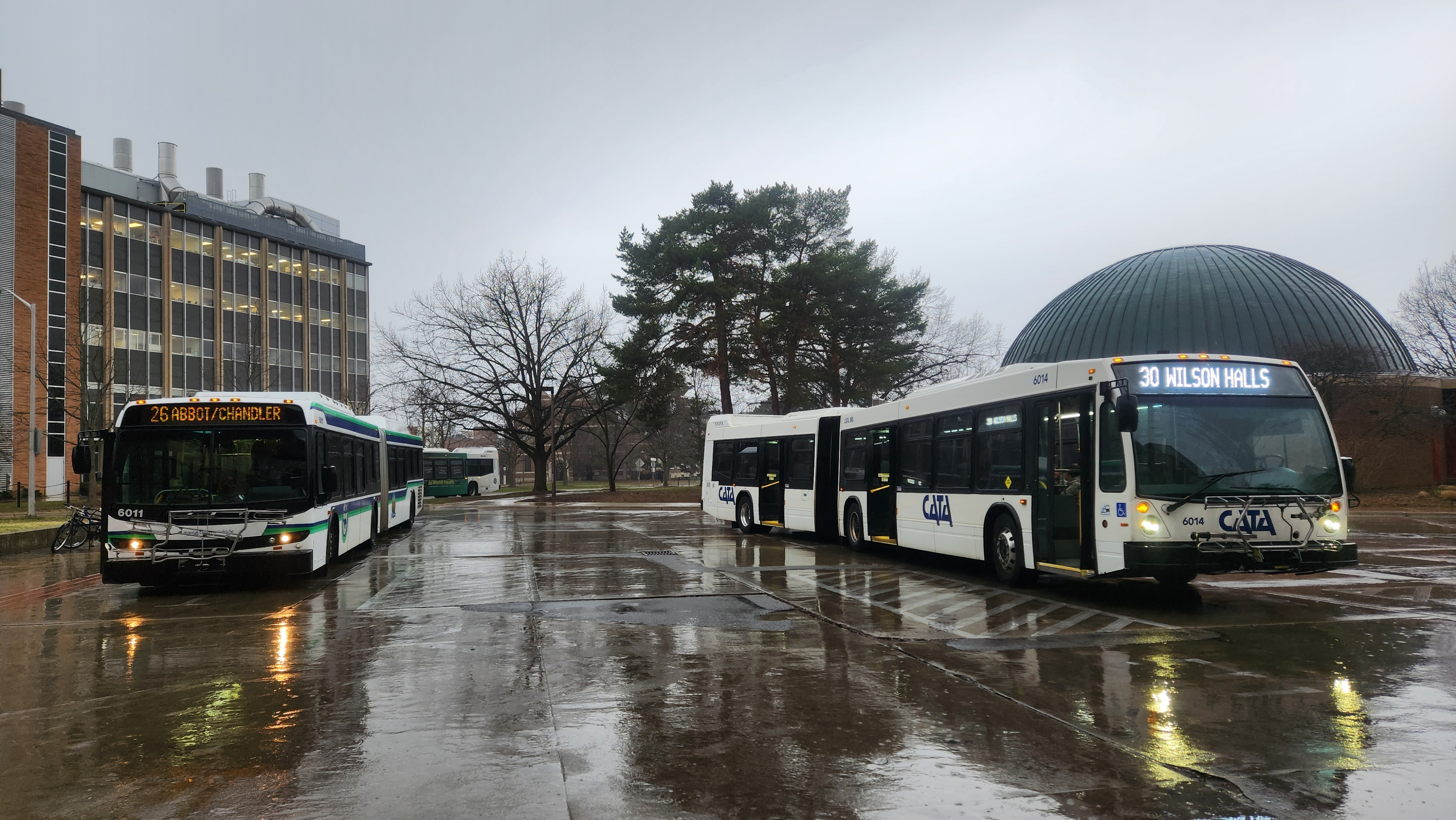
Two articulated buses at the MSU-CATA Transportation Center

=== Fixed-route bus service ===
CATA operates scheduled fixed-route bus services on 32 routes in Lansing, East Lansing, and neighboring communities. The system's main hub is the CATA Transportation Center (CTC) in downtown Lansing, with a satellite hub, the MSU-CATA Transportation Center (MSU-CTC), at Michigan State University.

These services are operated using a fleet of roughly 100 transit buses, including rigid and articulated buses of the New Flyer Low Floor, New Flyer Xcelsior, and Nova Bus LFS models.

==== List of current routes ====
As of March 2026:

- Route 1 is the network's main crosstown corridor, connecting Downtown Lansing, East Lansing, and Okemos
- Routes 2–5 and 7–16 begin in Downtown Lansing, and primarily serve Lansing neighborhoods in a hub-and-spoke pattern
- Routes 20–26 primarily serve East Lansing and the eastern suburbs of Okemos and Haslett
- Routes 30–39 are fare-free "Spartan Service" routes operating on the campus of Michigan State University, which only run during MSU's fall and spring semesters, excluding breaks, except for route 32, which runs year-round
- Routes 46 and 48 are limited-stop commuter routes between Lansing and outer Ingham County, which make one trip daily in each direction during peak hours on weekdays

| # | Route Name | Termini | | Frequency (min) | | | Notes |
| # | Route Name | Termini | | Mon-Fri | Sat | Sun | Notes |
|---|---|---|---|---|---|---|---|
| 1 | Downtown Lansing – Meridian Mall | CTC | Meridian Mall | 15-20 | 10-20 | 15-20 | additional Fri-Sat night service during MSU breaks |
| 2 | South Washington – Pleasant Grove | CTC | Sheffield Blvd & Bayview Dr | 30 | 30 | 30 | |
| 3 | Willow – Lansing Mall | CTC | Lansing Mall | 20-30 | 30 | 30 | |
| 5 | South Cedar – Edgewood | CTC | Edgewood Villas | 20-30 | 30 | 30 | |
| 6 | Cedar – Jolly Connection | Jolly Cedar Plaza | CATA Headquarters | 20-30 | - | - | |
| 7 | Aurelius – Miller | CTC | Dunckel Rd & Beau Jardin Dr | 45 | 80 | - | |
| 8 | Pennsylvania – Holt | CTC | Aurelius Rd & Davlind Dr (Holt) | 30-45 | 30 | 30 | |
| 9 | South MLK – Miller | CTC | Meijer, S Pennsylvania Ave. | 30 | 30 | 30 | |
| 10 | North Lansing – Turner | CTC | Thomas & Hall | 25-50 | 45 | 45 | |
| 11 | Waverly – Colonial Village | CTC | Deerfield & Holmes | 60 | - | - | |
| 12 | West Michigan – Waverly – LCC West | CTC | LCC West Campus | 30 | 45 | 45 | truncated to St. Joseph + Waverly on weekends & during LCC breaks |
| 13 | Groesbeck Area | CTC | Meijer, Lake Lansing Rd. | 60 | - | - | |
| 14 | North Grand River – Old Town – Airport | CTC | Capital Region Int'l Airport | 25-45 | 45 | 45 | |
| 15 | Kalamazoo – Frandor | CTC | Meijer, Lake Lansing Rd. | 60 | - | - | |
| 16 | Old Town – W. Lake Lansing – Eastwood | CTC | Meijer, Lake Lansing Rd. | 30 | 30 | 30 | |
| 18 | Capital City Crosstown | Mt. Hope Rd & Boston Blvd | Multimodal Gateway | 45-60 | - | - | |
| 20 | South Harrison – Jolly-Dunckel | Shaw Ln & Farm Ln, MSU | Beau Jardin & Dunckel | 35 | 60 | 60 | |
| 22 | MSU – Haslett – Meridian Mall (to Meridian Mall) Okemos – MSU (from Meridian Mall) | Shaw Ln & Farm Ln, MSU | Meridian Mall | 35 | 60 | - | |
| 23 | MSU – Okemos – Meridian Mall (to Meridian Mall) Haslett – MSU (from Meridian Mall) | Shaw Ln & Farm Ln, MSU | Meridian Mall | 35 | 60 | - | |
| 24 | East Lansing – Lake Lansing Road | MSU-CTC | Meijer, Lake Lansing Rd. | 30 | 60 | 60 | |
| 25 | North Harrison | MSU-CTC | Meijer, Lake Lansing Rd. | 60 | 60 | 60 | |
| 26 | Abbot – Chandler | MSU-CTC | Chandler Crossings | 45 | 40 | 40 | runs later and more frequently during MSU fall and spring semesters |
| 30 | South & East Neighborhoods | Holden & Wilson Halls, MSU | East Campus Boarding Center, MSU | | - | - | operates only during MSU fall and spring semesters |
| 31 | Brody Complex & East Neighborhoods | Brody Neighborhood, MSU | East Campus Boarding Center, MSU | | - | - | operates only during MSU fall and spring semesters |
| 32 | Commuter Lot 89 – Snyder Hall – Clinical Center | MSU-CTC | Commuter Lot 89, MSU | | - | - | runs twice as frequently during MSU fall and spring semesters |
| 33 | MSU Union – North & South Neighborhoods | Holden & Wilson Halls, MSU | MSU Union | | - | - | operates only during MSU fall and spring semesters |
| 34 | Brody – University Village | MSU-CTC | Brody Neighborhood, MSU | - | | | operates only during MSU fall and spring semesters |
| 35 | South Neighborhood – Spartan Village | MSU-CTC | Spartan Village, MSU | - | | | operates only during MSU fall and spring semesters |
| 36 | East Neighborhood | MSU-CTC | East Campus Boarding Center, MSU | - | | | operates only during MSU fall and spring semesters |
| 39 | University Village | Shaw Ln & Farm Ln, MSU | Spartan Village, MSU | | - | - | operates only during MSU fall and spring semesters |
| 46 | Mason Limited | CTC | Cedar St & Kerns Rd (Mason) | 2 trips daily | - | - | weekday peak direction only |
| 48 | Williamston–Webberville Limited | CTC | M-52 & I-96 (Webberville) | 2 trips daily | - | - | weekday peak direction only |

In addition to the main fixed-route network, CATA operates two "Connector" deviated fixed routes, which connect the main CATA service area to Mason, Williamston, and Webberville.

==== Fares ====
Fixed-route bus fares as of March 2026:

- Regular: $1.25
- Discounted (for seniors, Medicare cardholders, disabled riders, and local students): 60¢
- Children under 42" tall & U.S. military veterans: free

Single-ride fares include a transfer ticket upon request, valid for up to two additional rides within two hours, in the same direction or on a different route. Transfer tickets are not valid for return trips on the same route.

Fares can be paid onboard with cash, credit or debit cards, or using the Transit or CATA Mobile Pay mobile apps. Change cards (branded as CATACash) are issued through the farebox as change during cash transactions. Single-ride and 10-ride prepaid tickets, and 31-day unlimited ride passes, are sold at CATA's administrative offices, the CTC, and select retail stores.

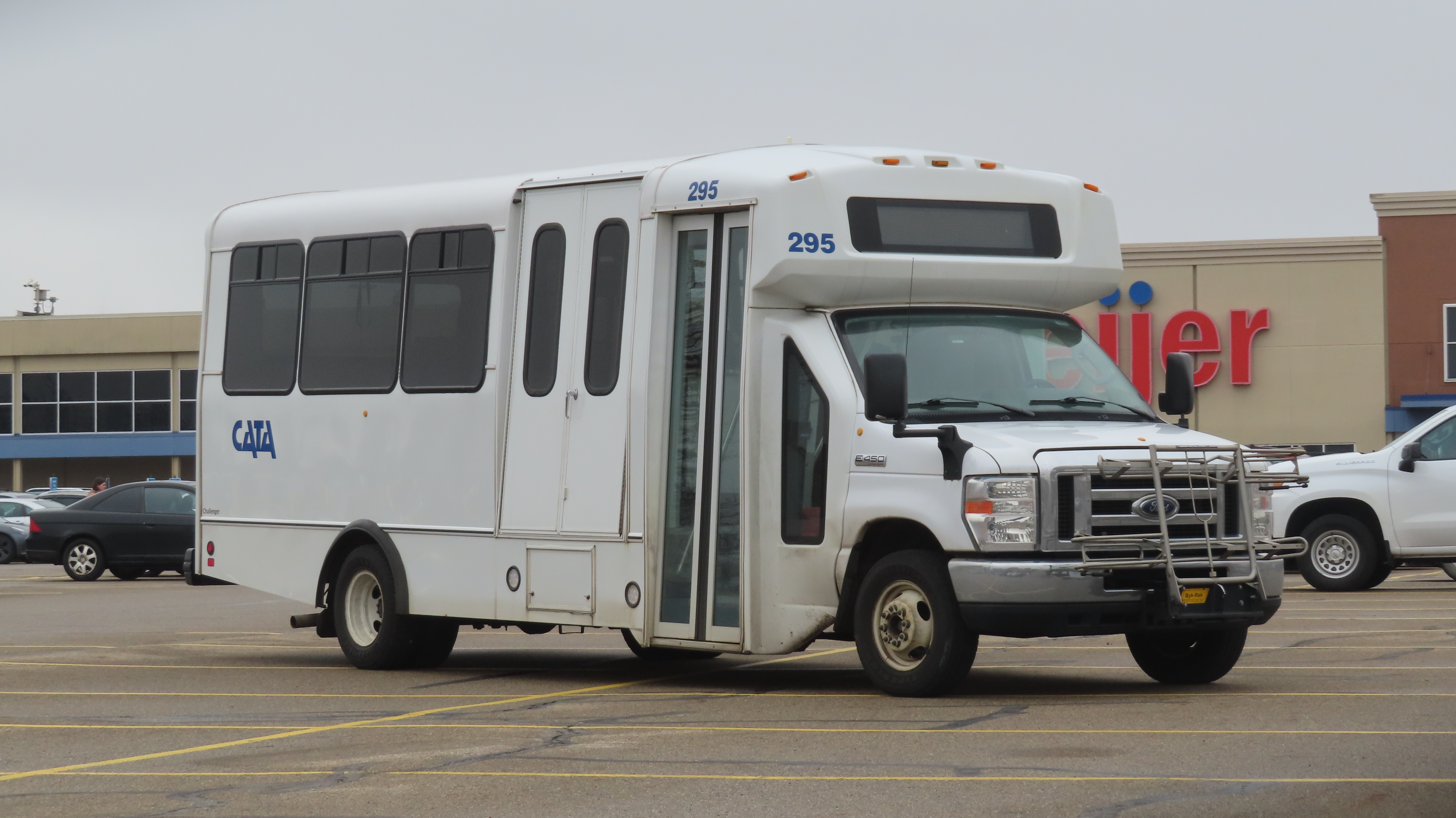
CATA minibus, used on Connector and demand-response services

=== Demand-response services ===
CATA offers multiple distinct demand-responsive transit services:

- Spec-Tran, a complementary paratransit service available in communities which have CATA fixed-route bus service
- Redi-Ride, an advance-reservation curb-to-curb service available in Mason, Delhi Township, and Meridian Township
- Rural Service, an advance-reservation service available in most outer areas of Ingham County
- MSU Night Owl, an on-demand service available at Michigan State University after fixed-route operating hours
- MSU Lot Link, an on-demand service serving outer parking lots of Michigan State University on weekends
- CATA Rydz, an app-based microtransit service operated by Via Transportation, serving portions of Lansing and Delta Township, Michigan State University, and Capital Region International Airport

These services are operated using a fleet of minibuses, vans, and minivans. Some of these services are operated by Transdev under contract.

== Governance ==
CATA is governed by a board of directors:

- Four members representing the City of Lansing:
  - Nathan Triplett (chair)
  - Derek Melot
  - Dusty Fancher (Vice Chair)
  - Jennie Gies
- Two members representing the City of East Lansing:
  - Shanna Draheim
  - Jack Schmitt
- Two members representing Meridian Township:
  - Phil Deschaine
  - Phyllis Vaughn
- One member representing Lansing Township:
  - Maggie Sanders
- One member representing Delhi Township:
  - Douglas Lecato
- One member representing Ingham County:
  - Mark Grebner
- One member representing Michigan State University:
  - John Prush
- Ex-Officio:
  - Terrance Augustine, Eaton County
