= National Liberation Army =

National Liberation Army is the name of:

- National Liberation Army (Algeria) (Armée de Libération Nationale), a liberation movement in the Algerian War of Independence
- National Movement for the Liberation of Azawad, refers to its fighters as the National Liberation Army
- National Liberation Army (Bolivia) (Ñancahuazú Guerrilla), a Marxist–Leninist movement during the 1960s and 1970s
- National Liberation Army (Colombia) (ELN - Ejército de Liberación Nacional), an active movement associated with the Colombian Civil War
- National Liberation Army of Iran, the former paramilitary branch of the People's Mojahedin Organization of Iran
- Irish National Liberation Army, an Irish Republican group active during The Troubles
- Kosovo Liberation Army, also known as the National Liberation Army of Kosovo
- National Liberation Army (Libya), the armed forces of Libyan rebels during the Libyan civil war
- National Liberation Army (Macedonia), a militant group in the 2001 insurgency in the Republic of Macedonia
- National Liberation Army and Partisan Detachments of Macedonia, a partisan detachment during World War II in Yugoslav Macedonia
- National Liberation Army (Peru)
- Liberation Tigers of Tamil Eelam, Sri Lanka
- West Papua National Liberation Army, a separatist army in Western New Guinea, Indonesia
- National Liberation Army (Yugoslavia), Yugoslav World War II resistance movement, the Partisans
- Zimbabwe African National Liberation Army, military wing of the Zimbabwe African National Union during the Rhodesian Bush War

== See also ==
- National Liberation Front (disambiguation)
