= Lansing station =

Lansing
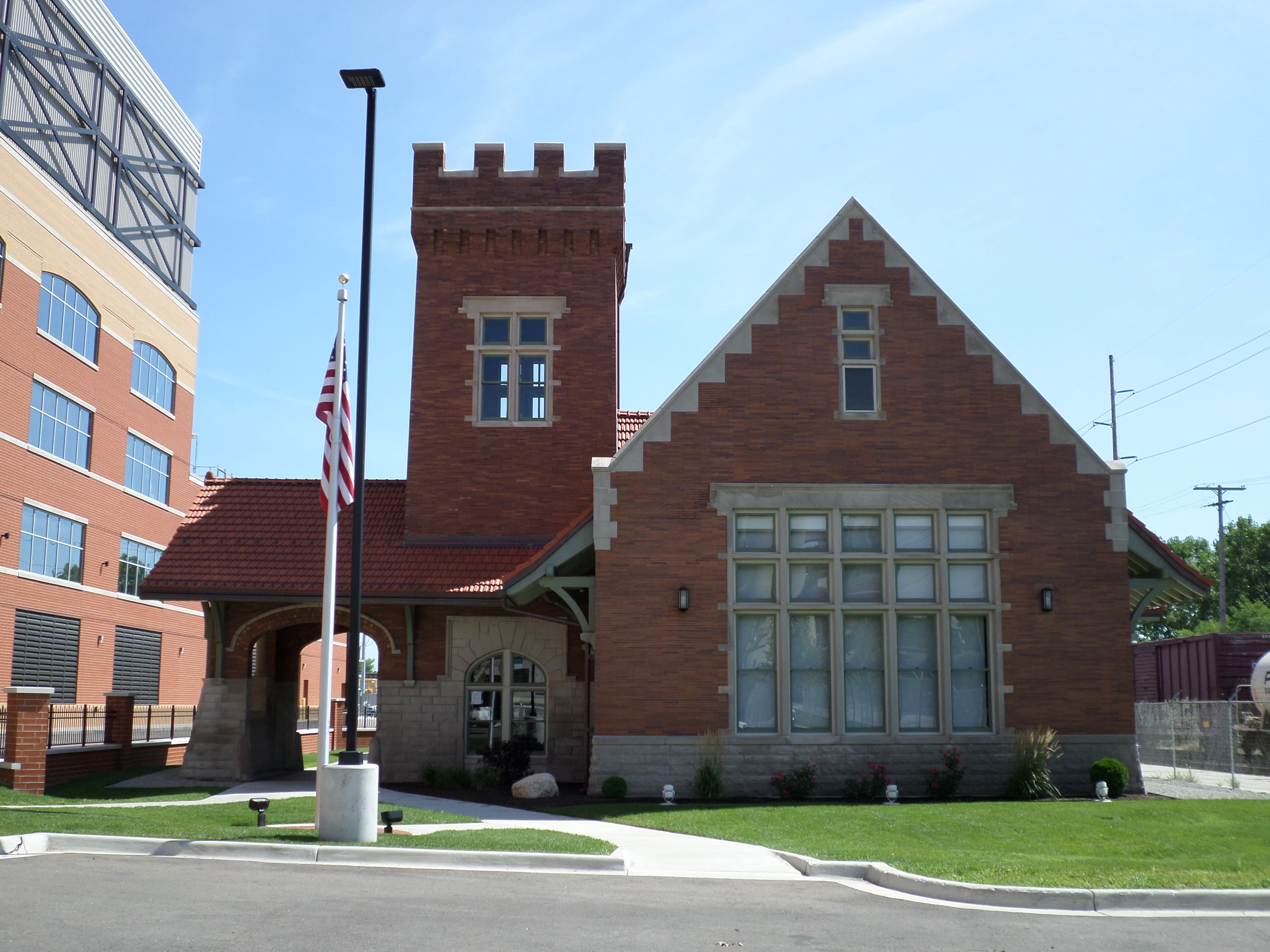
- View of station in 2014

General information
- Location: Lansing, Michigan; United States.
- System: Grand Trunk Railroad

Construction
- Structure type: one floor

Other information
- Status: restored

History
- Opened: 1902
- Closed: 1971
- Former names: Grand Trunk Railroad

Former services
Preceding station	Grand Trunk Western Railroad	Following station
Potterville toward Chicago	Main Line	Trowbridge toward Port Huron
- Grand Trunk Western Rail Station/Lansing Depot
- U.S. National Register of Historic Places
- Michigan State Historic Site
- Location within Michigan Location within the United States
- Location: 1203 S. Washington Ave. Lansing, Michigan
- Coordinates: 42°43′10″N 84°33′5″W
- Built: 1902
- Architect: Spier & Rohns
- Architectural style: Jacobethan
- NRHP reference No.: 80004605

Significant dates
- Added to NRHP: July 3, 1980
- Designated MSHS: April 11, 1977
Location

Lansing station was a historic Canadian National Railway station in Lansing, Michigan. The station was listed as a Michigan State Historic Site in 1978, and it was added to the National Register of Historic Places in 1980.

== History ==
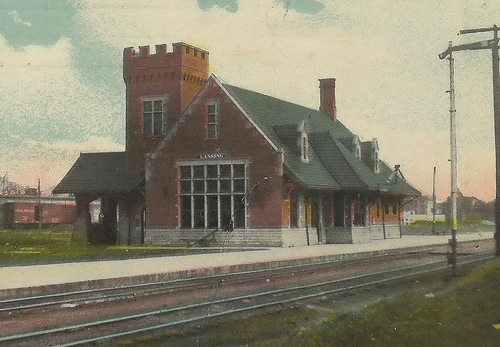
View of Station in 1910

The first rail line through Lansing was established in 1856 when the Detroit and Milwaukee Railroad constructed a line through the city. This was followed in 1872 by the Michigan Central Railroad and in 1879 by the Chicago and Grand Trunk Railway. By the early 1900s there were six separate rail lines through the city. After the Chicago and Grand Trunk Railway reorganized in 1900, they built a series of new depots along their line. When REO Motor Car Company announced the construction of a new plant along the Grand Trunk line, the railroad decided to construct their new depot near the new REO plant.

Grand Trunk commissioned the firm of Spier & Rohns to design the new depot. Construction on the new depot began in 1902 and was completed late that year. It served as a main depot for all passengers until 1971, when the railroad closed the station. In 1972, it was renovated as a restaurant. The building's exterior remains unchanged. Gerald R. Ford, who was from Michigan and the 38th president of the United States, dined here during a campaign tour on May 15, 1976.

The building was abandoned in the early 2000s. In 2010, the Lansing Board of Water & Light began construction of a powerplant adjacent to the depot, and included a full restoration of the station in the project.

== Description ==
The Lansing Grand Trunk Western station is a single story, rectangular Jacobethan style red-brick building on a gray ashlar foundation. It measures 33 feet wide and 107 feet long. The main entrance is housed in a two-story, ten-foot square brick tower which is topped by a crenelated parapet. The roof is covered with red Ludowici tile, and has overhanging eaves. The window hoods, sills, facings, and gable copings are of Bedford limestone. At one end of the building is a waiting platform, covered with a gable roof supported by wooden posts.
