= National Liberation Front =

National Liberation Front may refer to:

== As a full name ==
- National Liberation Front (Algeria) (FLN), Group that fought for Algerian independence
- National Liberation Front of Angola (FNLA), Group that fought for Angolan independence
- National Liberation Front – Bahrain (NLF), Marxist Leninist Party in Bahrain
- National Liberation Front (Burundi) (FROLINA), Hutu Political Party
- National Liberation Front of Corsica (FLNC), Corsican Nationalist Militant Group
- National Liberation Front (Greece) (EAM), Greek Resistance Movement against Axis occupation
- National Liberation Front (Jammu Kashmir) (NLF)
- National Liberation Front (Macedonia) (NOF), Militant group participating in the Greek Civil War
- National Liberation Front (Peru) (FLN), Peruvian political party
- National Liberation Front (South Africa) (NLF), co-founded by Neville Alexander
- National Liberation Front of Tripura (NLFT) (India)
- National Liberation Front of Venezuela (NLFV) (Venezuela)
- National Liberation Front (Sri Lanka) (NLF)
- National Liberation Front for South Vietnam (NLFSV), also called "Viet Cong".
- National Liberation Front (South Yemen) (NLF)

== As part of a name ==
- Farabundo Martí National Liberation Front (FMLN) (El Salvador)
- Gorkha National Liberation Front (GNLF) (India)
- Kanak and Socialist National Liberation Front (FLNKS) (New Caledonia)
- Karbi Longri N.C. Hills Liberation Front (KLNLF) (India)
- Khmer People's National Liberation Front (KPNLF)
- Kurdistan Workers' Party, or National Liberation Front of Kurdistan (ENRK) -- military wing of PKK
- Liberation Front of the Slovene Nation (Slovenia)
- Moro National Liberation Front (MNLF) (Philippines)
- National Liberation Movement (Albania), or Albanian National Liberation Front (NLF)
- Ogaden National Liberation Front (ONLF) (Ethiopia)
- Sandinista National Liberation Front (FSLN) (Nicaragua)
- Uganda National Liberation Front (UNLF)
- Unitary National Liberation Front, or People's Liberation Front (Yugoslavia)
- United National Liberation Front (UNLF) (India)
- National Front for Liberation (Syria)

== See also ==
- National Liberation Army (disambiguation)
- National Liberation Movement (disambiguation)
- Wars of national liberation
