= National Liberation Party of Unity =

Political party in Indonesia

The National Liberation Party of Unity (Indonesian: Partai Persatuan Pembebasan Nasional, also known as PAPERNAS) is an Indonesian left-leaning party founded in 2006 by the merger of several smaller parties. It holds a social-democratic ideology.
