= International (Amtrak train) =

American named passenger train (1982–2004)

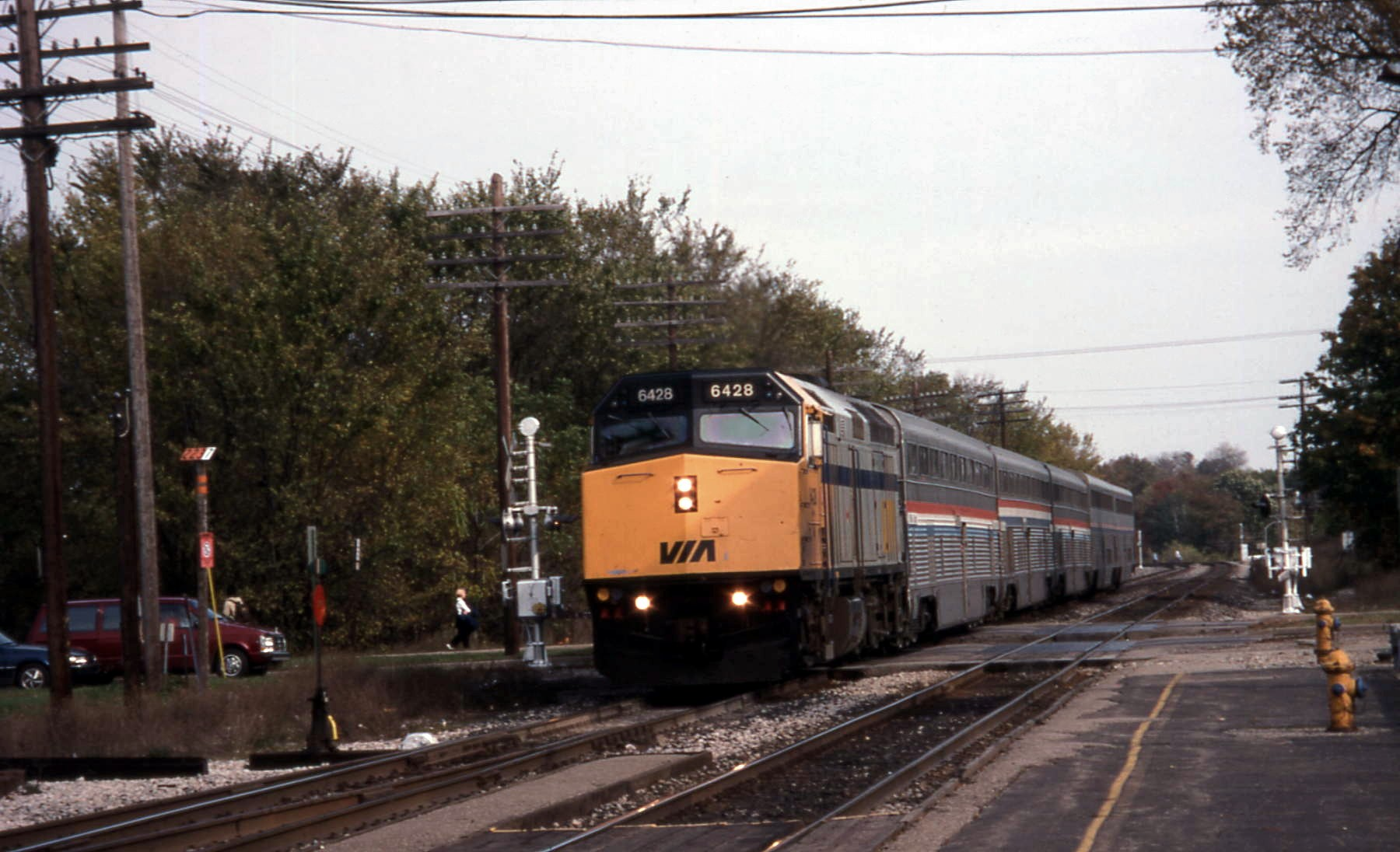
- A Via Rail EMD F40PH leads the International with Amtrak Hi-Level and Superliner coaches into East Lansing in 1996

Overview
- Service type: Intercity rail
- Status: Discontinued
- Locale: Midwestern United States/Southern Ontario
- Predecessor: Blue Water Limited
- First service: October 31, 1982
- Last service: April 23, 2004
- Successor: Blue Water
- Former operator: Amtrak/Via Rail

Route
- Termini: Chicago, Illinois; Toronto, Ontario
- Stops: 19
- Distance travelled: 502 mi (808 km)
- Average journey time: 10 hours 47 minutes
- Service frequency: Daily
- Train numbers: 364, 365, 367 (Amtrak); 88, 85, 685 (Via)

On-board services
- Class: Reserved coach
- Catering facilities: On-board cafe

Technical
- Rolling stock: Superliner coaches
- Track gauge: 4 ft 8 1/2 in (1,435 mm)

The International (formerly International Limited) was a named passenger train operated between Chicago and Toronto. It was originally an overnight train operated by the Grand Trunk Railway of Canada and its successors the Canadian National Railway and Grand Trunk Western Railroad, running as far as Montreal. The train was cut back to Port Huron, Michigan, in 1970 and discontinued in 1971.

In 1982, Amtrak and Via Rail revived the route by extending Amtrak's Blue Water Limited from Port Huron to Toronto. It was renamed as the International the next year. The service was initially successful but encountered numerous funding crises in the late 1990s and early 2000s. Substantial delays crossing the international border after the September 11th attacks, combined with freight congestion and the 2003 SARS outbreak, drastically reduced ridership. In 2004, the train was replaced with the Blue Water, which offered a better interstate schedule and higher reliability.

== History ==
=== CN/GTW operation ===
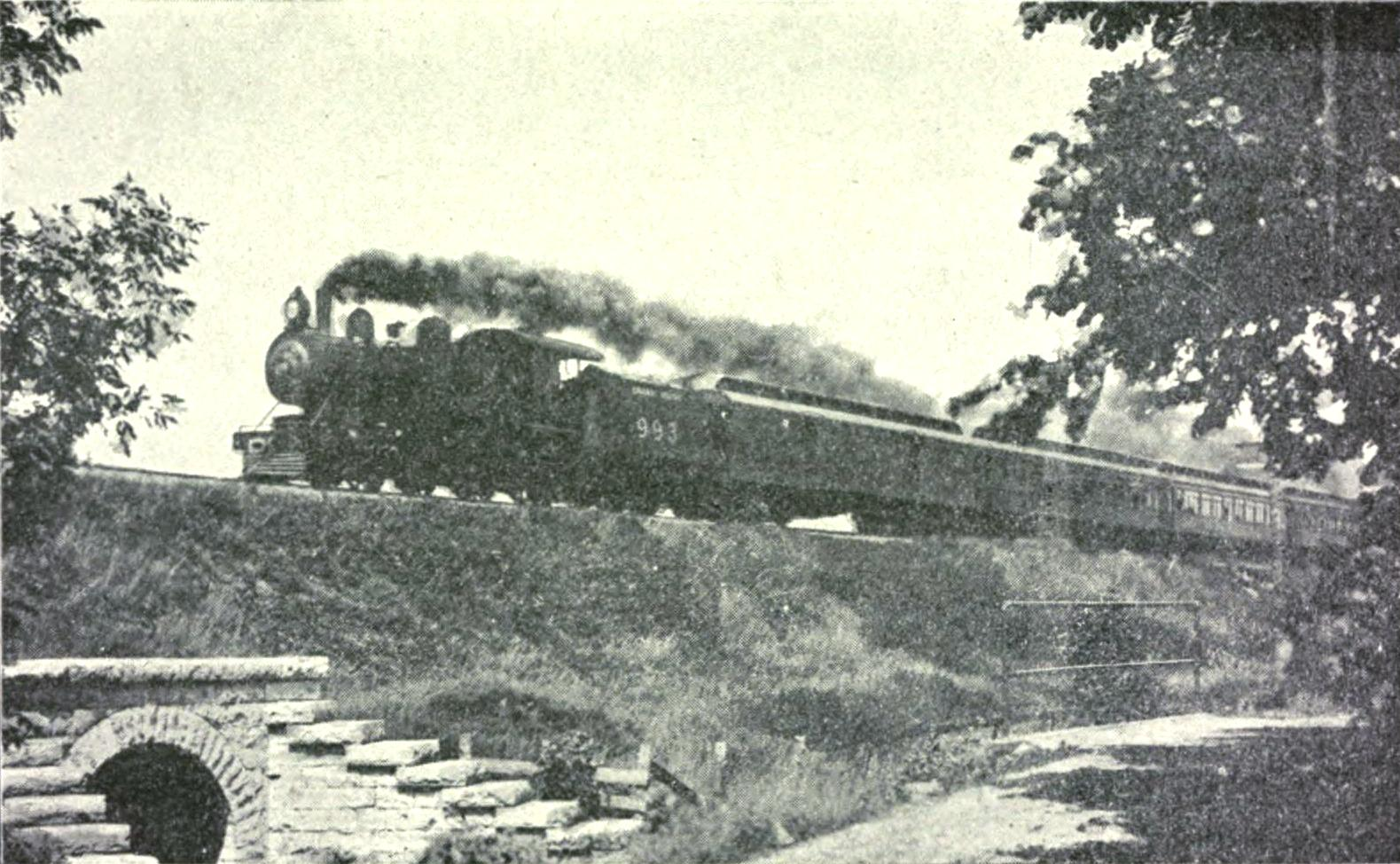
The eastbound International Limited operating on the Grand Trunk Railway around 1909

The Grand Trunk Railway opened its St. Clair Tunnel between Sarnia, Ontario and Port Huron, Michigan in 1891, completing the first direct all-rail route from Chicago to Toronto and Montreal. The Canadian National Railway (CN) and Grand Trunk Western Railroad (GTW) introduced the International Limited on May 25, 1900. The train operated between Chicago's Dearborn Station and Montreal's Bonaventure Station via Port Huron, with the overnight section between Chicago and Toronto. The 844-mile (1,358 km) trip was originally scheduled for 22 hours and 52 minutes – an average speed of 36.9 miles per hour (59.4 km/h). The "premier train of the Grand Trunk Railway System", it was assigned numbers 1/2.

The Grand Trunk dropped all train names in 1907. In 1912, the Chicago–Montreal service was changed to numbers 14/15 to allow the Montreal–Prince Rupert Continental Limited to receive numbers 1/2. The International Limited name was restored in March 1919—the first GTW train to have a name since 1907. It remained the premier GTW train and received new equipment in 1929. After 1931, westbound train No. 15 was as much as 4.5 hours faster than its eastbound counterpart, which made local stops between Toronto and Montreal.

The CN and the Canadian Pacific Railway (CP) began pooling equipment for their competing Montreal–Toronto services in 1933. The eastern half of the International Limited was jointly operated between the CN and CP; it included a CP through car, and train No. 15 departed from the CP Windsor Station. The train was split into Montreal–Toronto and Chicago–Toronto services – both carrying the same numbers – during pre-war service changes in 1939. Montreal Central Station replaced Bonaventure Station as the CN terminus in 1943.

In the 1940s, a typical International Limited had three sleeping cars, a buffet lounge, a dining car, and three or more coach cars. By the 1960s, the lounge only operated west of Port Huron, and the dining car only to the east. The International Limited was always the fastest Chicago–Montreal service; the westbound train made connections in Chicago to southern, western, and southwestern trains.

Until 1964, the International Limited was one of three daily Chicago–Toronto trips on the GTW, along with the Inter-City Limited and La Salle/Maple Leaf. GTW and parent company CN used aggressive marketing, inexpensive fares, and on-board perks like free meals to attract riders. East Lansing station opened as an experimental stop for Michigan State University and proved successful. However, the Grand Trunk was still losing "staggering amounts of money" running the service. The eastbound Inter-City Limited was cut to Port Huron in November 1964, and cut entirely on October 29, 1967, along with the La Salle when the Chicago-Detroit Mohawk was added. In 1965, the pooling arrangement was terminated; in the ensuing rearrangements, only the Chicago–Toronto section (renumbered 155/156) retained the International Limited name.

The International Limited was cut back to Port Huron on June 12, 1970, leaving the Maple Leaf (the westbound a 1966-renamed Inter-City Limited) as the railroad's only Toronto train. The CN added local trains between Toronto and London, Ontario approximating the former schedule. The Interstate Commerce Commission approved GTW plans in September 1970 to terminate the no-longer-international International, but a judicial order and the pending takeover of intercity rail service in the United States by Amtrak kept the service operating. Amtrak did not retain any of the six GTW trains (the International Limited, Maple Leaf, and Mohawk). They made their last runs on April 30, 1971; the International Limited was the last intercity train to depart from Dearborn Station.

=== Amtrak/Via operation ===
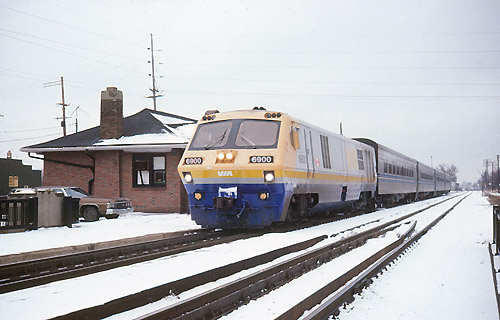
The International Limited at Flint in 1982

In 1974, Amtrak restored service over the GTW to Port Huron with the Blue Water (renamed the Blue Water Limited in 1975). After Via Rail took over Canadian intercity passenger services in 1978, Amtrak saw a chance to improve the Blue Water Limited's financial performance by extending it to Toronto. Talks between the agencies began in late 1981. Negotiations soon reached a stalemate; Michigan desired a later Sunday schedule so that weekend travelers to Toronto could return late in the evening, but Via did not. Michigan was also worried about losing day trips to Chicago; supported primarily by ridership west of East Lansing, the Blue Water Limited was Amtrak's most-used state-supported route with only one daily round trip.

The New York-Toronto Maple Leaf, introduced in April 1981, had proved an immediate success, and Amtrak and Via soon reached an agreement to extend the Blue Water Limited to Toronto as well. Via accepted the later Sunday train and agreed to share equipment for the route. Michigan funded a Flint-Battle Creek bus, which connected with the westbound Wolverine and eastbound Twilight Limited, to preserve Flint-Chicago day trips. The International Limited began operations on October 31, 1982, replacing the Blue Water Limited. In contrast to its predecessor, it used ex-Penn Central trackage west of Battle Creek, Michigan—in common with Amtrak's other Michigan trains—and ran on a daylight schedule. On June 13, 1983, Amtrak renamed the train the International, which it carried until its discontinuance.

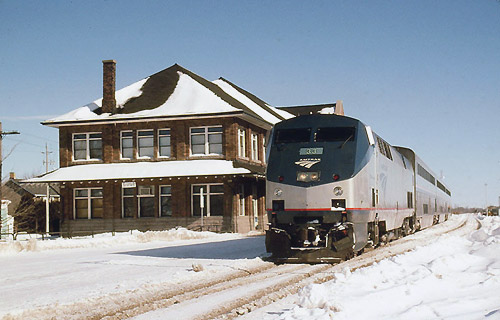
The International began serving Stratford (pictured in 2004) in 1990

On January 15, 1990, Via moved the International off its original CN route to a more northerly route between London and Toronto. The new route enabled it to service Kitchener, Ontario, but added an hour to its running time. There were also several never-enacted proposals to reroute the train within Michigan. A 1984 state plan would have run the International through Grand Rapids; instead, the independent Pere Marquette was started using funds saved by the startup of the International Limited and the discontinuance of the Michigan Executive. In 1995, during a funding crunch, Amtrak proposed routing the International through Durand, Pontiac, and Detroit, thus dropping Flint and Port Huron. In 2000, Amtrak proposed moving the train entirely to the Chicago–Detroit line later that year. Detroit station would have been skipped entirely; Amtrak would no longer have used state funds for the International, though they may have been used for a replacement Port Huron train instead. Neither proposal was ultimately enacted.

=== Decline and discontinuance ===
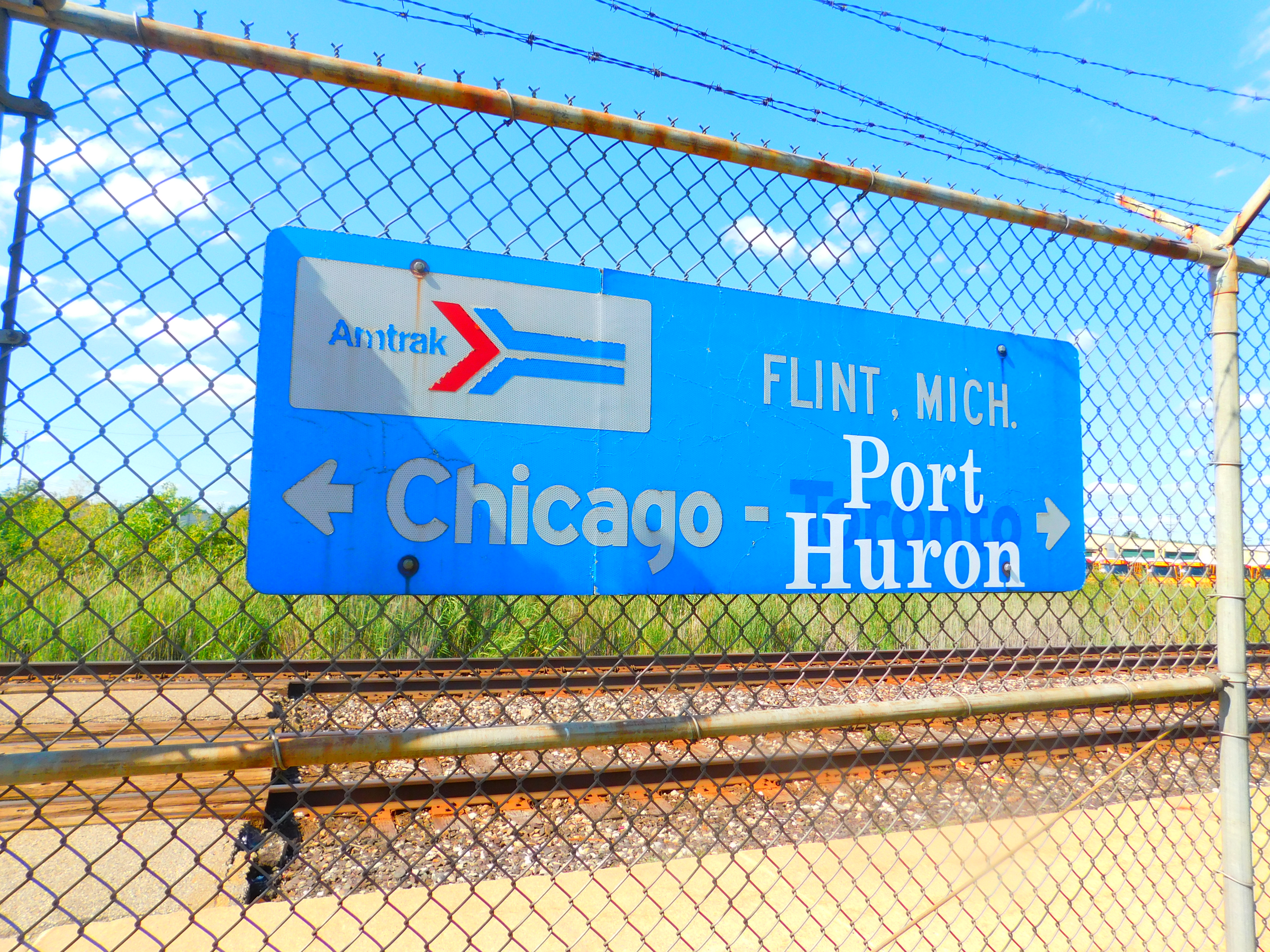
Signage at the Flint station denoting the current Blue Water destination and International Limited destination

Beginning in the late 1990s, Amtrak services in Michigan suffered a series of funding crises. The Pere Marquette was reduced to four times a week in April 1995; that September, a state commission voted to reduce the International to quad-weekly to restore daily operation on the Pere Marquette. The commission elected to keep the daily International in January 1996; in 1997, the state and Amtrak agreed to an 18-month contract lasting through March 31, 1999. Despite an extension, Amtrak proposed to end the train on October 2, 2000. After negotiations proceeded well, the state approved $6.7 million on January 17, 2001, to continue funding for the International. With ridership falling, state officials were reluctant to pursue a long-term funding solution, instead opting for small extensions often by diverting other rail funds.

Until 2001, the International had a customs stop of about one hour, with U.S. officials conducting screenings on the train at Port Huron. After the September 11 attacks, security personnel were redeployed to the Blue Water Bridge, and U.S. Customs refused to continue on-board screenings. (On-board screenings continued on Amtrak's two of the three other border-crossing routes; Amtrak Cascades uses preclearance instead.) Westbound passengers had to be bussed with their luggage from Sarnia to Port Huron, costing Amtrak $27,000 a month. The security issues caused massive delays, even after on-board screening resumed on February 19, 2002, amid complaints from the state and both railroads. By this time, just 8 to 15 passengers crossed the border on a typical day.

Delays caused by the border crossing and freight congestion continued to erode ridership, as did the 2003 SARS outbreak in Toronto. Ridership plunged from 125,126 in 1997 to just 88,045 in 2002. Amtrak suggested to Michigan that the International be truncated to Port Huron, which would allow for a more reliable trip on the former Blue Water Limited schedule, restore connections in Chicago, and allow day trips to Chicago. With state agreement, the final International ran eastbound on April 22, 2004, and westbound the next day (along with a Port Huron eastbound on the International schedule). On April 24, 2004, the Port Huron-Chicago Blue Water began operation. Via retained a single daily Toronto-Sarnia round trip that was merged into its Corridor service, but a planned Port Huron-Sarnia bus was never implemented.

== Equipment ==
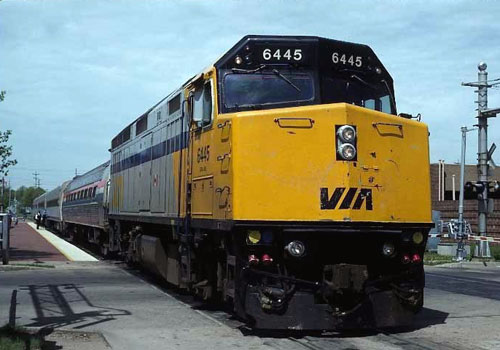
The International with a Via locomotive and Amtrak coaches in 1994

In its early years, the train usually consisted of two or three coaches and a food-service / custom-class car combination. Amtrak and Via alternated equipment: Amtrak used diesel locomotives and Amfleet coaches, while Via used LRCs and Tempo coaches. Equipment assignments and allocations frequently changed; after the Via equipment was sidelined due to winter conditions in 1985, only Amtrak cars were used. On August 10, 1988, Via began using nine LRC passenger cars with the tilt mechanism removed (making them compatible with Amtrak cafe cars) pulled by F40PH locomotives.

In November 1995, all trains began using four or five Amtrak Superliner and Hi-Level cars, pulled by Via F40PH locomotives. The F40PHs were not compatible with the newly installed Incremental Train Control System, so they were replaced with Amtrak P32-8WH locomotives late in 1999. The Horizon Fleet was substituted beginning in 2000 to allow the Superliners to add capacity to western trains, and Genesis locomotives were used in the final years.
