= Flint Subdivision =

Railway line in Michigan

Overview
- Owner: Canadian National Railway
- Locale: Michigan
- Termini: Battle Creek, Michigan; Port Huron, Michigan

Service
- Services: Blue Water

Technical
- Line length: 158.7 mi (255.4 km)
- Number of tracks: 1
- Track gauge: 1,435 mm (4 ft 8 1/2 in) standard gauge

The Flint Subdivision is a railway line in the state of Michigan. It is owned by the Canadian National Railway and runs from a junction with the Michigan Line and CN's South Bend Subdivision in Battle Creek, Michigan, to Port Huron, Michigan. At Port Huron, on the shores on Lake Huron, it connects with the Strathroy Subdivision which runs through the St. Clair Tunnel into Ontario. Historically, the line was part of the Grand Trunk Western Railroad mainline between Chicago and Toronto.

Today the line mostly handles freight. Amtrak's Blue Water uses the line between Battle Creek and Port Huron. Freight yards on or near the line are located in Port Huron, Flint, Durand, Lansing, and Battle Creek.
