= The Big Move rapid transit projects =

2008 collection of rapid transit projects in the Greater Toronto Area

The Big Move is a regional transportation plan (RTP) published in 2008 and consisting of 62 rapid transit projects to be implemented across the Greater Toronto and Hamilton Area (GTHA). These rapid transit projects are intended to form a seamlessly integrated regional rapid transit network, which is the first priority action in the regional transportation plan. These projects form two long-term templates with 15 and 25 year horizons. These templates outline broad projects; specific details about technology, alignment, stations and service levels for each project are subsequently determined though a cost–benefit analysis or an environmental assessment process.

== List of projects ==
Horizon	Type	Project		Termini	
15 years	Express rail	1	Lakeshore West and East	Hamilton / West Harbour	Oshawa
15 years	Express rail	2	Kitchener	Brampton	Union
15 years	Regional rail	3	Niagara extension	West Harbour	Confederation
15 years	Regional rail	4	Milton	Meadowvale (Note: Changed from the original plan on 14 February 2013, when the Metrolinx board of directors endorsed an update to the Big Move.)	Union
15 years	Regional rail	5	Georgetown	Mount Pleasant	Union
15 years	Regional rail	6	Union Pearson Express	Pearson Airport	Union
15 years	Regional rail	8	Crosstown	Dundas West / Bloor	Summerhill
15 years	Regional rail	9	Barrie	East Gwillimbury	Union
15 years	Regional rail	10	Richmond Hill	Richmond Hill	Union
15 years	Regional rail	11	Richmond Hill	Bloomington	Richmond Hill
15 years	Regional rail	12	Stouffville	Mount Joy	Union
15 years	Regional rail	14	Seaton	Seaton	Union / Summerhill
15 years	Regional rail	15	Lakeshore East	Oshawa	Bowmanville
15 years	Subway	16	Spadina extension	Sheppard West	Vaughan
15 years	Subway	17	Yonge extension	Finch	Richmond Hill Centre
15 years	Subway	48	Relief Line	Pape	Dundas West
15 years	Other rapid transit (LRT/BRT/AGT)	18	A-Line	Hamilton	Hamilton Airport
15 years	Other rapid transit (LRT/BRT/AGT)	19	B-Line	McMaster University	Eastgate Square
15 years	Other rapid transit (LRT/BRT/AGT)	20	Burlington Connector	Downtown Burlington	Burlington
15 years	Other rapid transit (LRT/BRT/AGT)	21	Dundas Street BRT	Brant Street	Kipling
15 years	Other rapid transit (LRT/BRT/AGT)	22	Trafalgar	Highway 407	Oakville
15 years	Other rapid transit (LRT/BRT/AGT)	23	403 Transitway	Oakville	Renforth
15 years	Other rapid transit (LRT/BRT/AGT)	24	Highway 10	Mayfield West	Brampton
15 years	Other rapid transit (LRT/BRT/AGT)	25	Main Street	Downtown Brampton	Highway 407
15 years	Other rapid transit (LRT/BRT/AGT)	26	Hurontario LRT	Highway 407	Port Credit
15 years	Other rapid transit (LRT/BRT/AGT)	27	Waterfront West LRT	Port Credit	Union
15 years	Other rapid transit (LRT/BRT/AGT)	28	Züm Queen	Downtown Brampton	Peel–York boundary
15 years	Other rapid transit (LRT/BRT/AGT)	29	Viva Highway 7	Peel–York boundary	Locust Hill
15 years	Other rapid transit (LRT/BRT/AGT)	30	Finch West LRT	Pearson Airport	Finch
15 years	Other rapid transit (LRT/BRT/AGT)	31	Eglinton Crosstown LRT	Pearson Airport	Kennedy
15 years	Other rapid transit (LRT/BRT/AGT)	32	Highway 427 South	Pearson Airport	Kipling
15 years	Other rapid transit (LRT/BRT/AGT)	33	Jane	Vaughan	Jane
15 years	Other rapid transit (LRT/BRT/AGT)	34	Don Mills	Highway 7	Donlands
15 years	Other rapid transit (LRT/BRT/AGT)	35	Viva Yonge	Richmond Hill Centre	Newmarket
15 years	Other rapid transit (LRT/BRT/AGT)	36	Sheppard East LRT	Don Mills	Meadowvale Road
15 years	Other rapid transit (LRT/BRT/AGT)	37	Scarborough RT	Kennedy	Malvern
15 years	Other rapid transit (LRT/BRT/AGT)	38	Highway 2	Scarborough Centre	Downtown Oshawa
15 years	Other rapid transit (LRT/BRT/AGT)	39	Brock Road	Pickering Town Centre	Highway 407
15 years	Other rapid transit (LRT/BRT/AGT)	40	Oshawa Connector	Oshawa Central	Downtown Oshawa
15 years	Other rapid transit (LRT/BRT/AGT)	41	Stage 2 ION	Fairway station	Downtown Cambridge
15 years	BRT in mixed traffic	42	Highway 407	Burlington	Brooklin
15 years	New corridor	43	Highway 410 extension	Bovaird Drive	Hurontario Street
15 years	New corridor	44	Highway 427 extension	Highway 7	Major Mackenzie Drive
15 years	New corridor	45	Highway 404 extension	East Gwillimbury	Keswick
15 years	New corridor	46	Highway 407 East	Highway 7	Highway 35 / 115
25 years	Express rail	47	Mississauga	Cooksville	Union
25 years	Express rail	4	Richmond Hill	Langstaff Gateway	Union
25 years	Regional rail	5	Milton	Meadowvale	Milton
25 years	Regional rail	7	Georgetown	Georgetown	Mount Pleasant
25 years	Regional rail	9	Bolton	Bolton	Union
25 years	Regional rail	13	Barrie	Bradford	East Gwillimbury
25 years	Regional rail	49	Havelock	Locust Hill	Union
25 years	Other rapid transit (LRT/BRT/AGT)	50	T-Line	Centre Mall	Linc / Mohawk Road
25 years	Other rapid transit (LRT/BRT/AGT)	51	Brant	Burlington	Dundas Street
25 years	Other rapid transit (LRT/BRT/AGT)	52	Trafalgar/Main	Milton	Highway 407
25 years	Other rapid transit (LRT/BRT/AGT)	53	Züm Steeles	Lisgar	Highway 427
25 years	Other rapid transit (LRT/BRT/AGT)	54	Highway 427 North	Pearson Airport	Queen Street
25 years	Other rapid transit (LRT/BRT/AGT)	55	407 Transitway	Highway 427	Unionville
25 years	Other rapid transit (LRT/BRT/AGT)	56	Steeles	Milliken	York University
25 years	Other rapid transit (LRT/BRT/AGT)	57	Viva North	Davis Drive	East Gwillimbury
25 years	Other rapid transit (LRT/BRT/AGT)	58	McCowan	Markham Centre	Scarborough Centre
25 years	Other rapid transit (LRT/BRT/AGT)	59	Scarborough Malvern	Kennedy	Malvern
25 years	Other rapid transit (LRT/BRT/AGT)	60	Steeles/Taunton	Milliken	Downtown Oshawa
25 years	Other rapid transit (LRT/BRT/AGT)	61	Simcoe	Downtown Oshawa	Highway 407
25 years	New corridor	62	Niagara–GTA	Hamilton	Niagara
25 years	New corridor	63	GTA–West	Guelph	Bolton

== Implementation ==
=== GO Transit Regional Express Rail ===
Regional Express Rail is a project to improve GO Transit train service by adding all-day, two-way service to the Barrie line and the inner portions of the Kitchener line and the Stouffville line, and by increasing frequency of train service on various lines to as often as every 15 minutes on five of the corridors. This would be achieved with the full electrification of the Lakeshore East line and the Barrie line and the electrification of the inner portions of the Lakeshore West line, the Kitchener line, the Barrie line and the Stouffville line.

=== Toronto ===
==== LRT projects ====
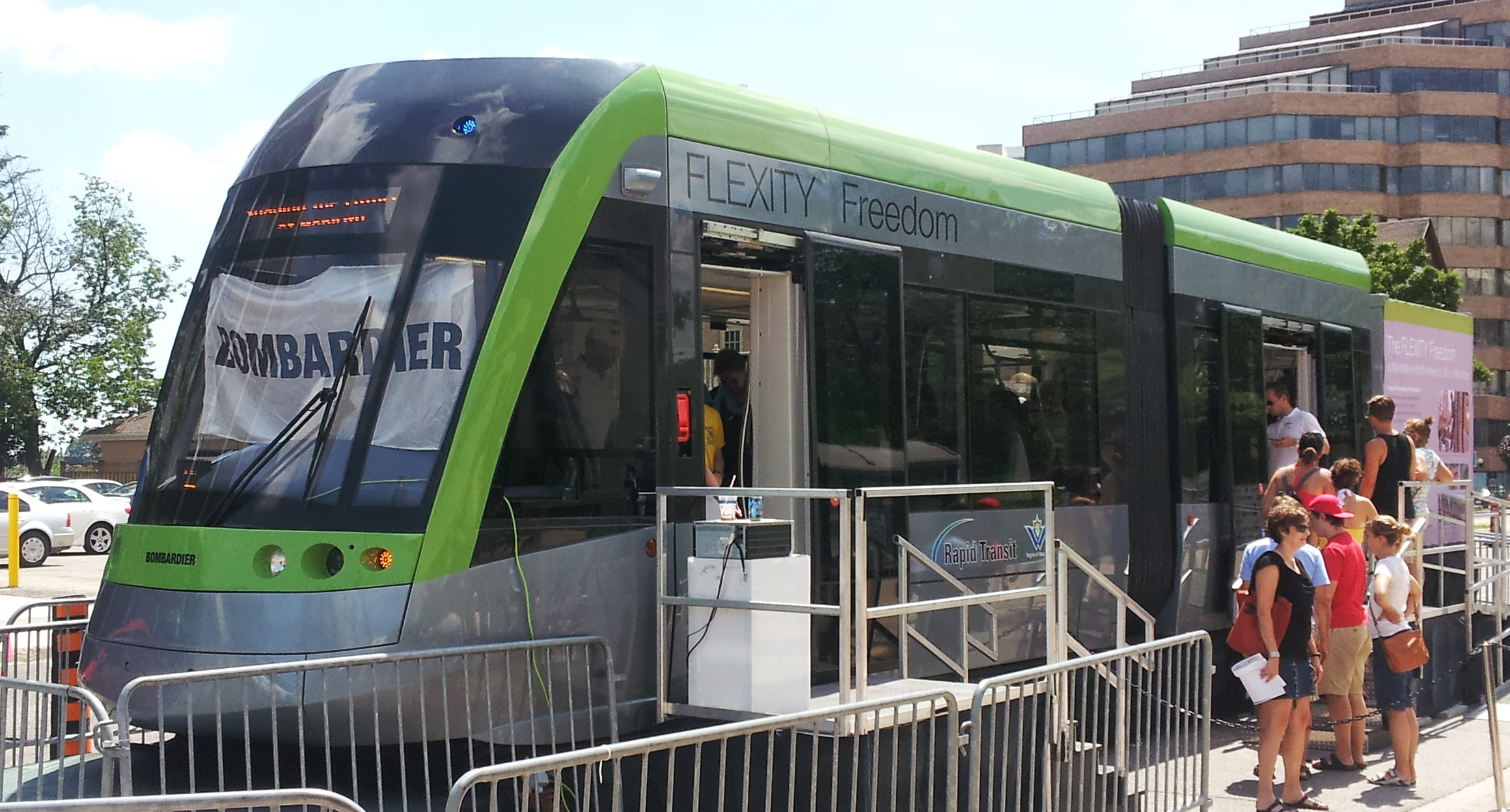
A mock-up of the Bombardier Flexity Freedom that was planned to be used on LRT lines across the GTHA

On 28 September 2012, Metrolinx signed a master agreement with the Toronto Transit Commission (TTC) to implement four new light rail transit lines in Toronto:

- Sheppard East LRT
- Finch West LRT
- Line 5 Eglinton
- Replacement of Line 3 Scarborough.

These projects were also identified in Transit City, a rapid transit plan announced by former Toronto mayor David Miller and TTC chair Adam Giambrone on 16 March 2007. After $4 billion in provincial funding for Transit City from the Ontario government was deferred, the projects were rolled into a "5 in 10" plan, referring to goal of completing the four LRT lines and a BRT line in ten years. The plan also included the purchase of 182 light rail vehicles from Bombardier Transportation.

In December 2010, Rob Ford, who succeeded David Miller as mayor, announced his intention to cancel key parts of Transit City, saying "we will not build any more rail tracks down the middle of our streets." However, he was open to the Eglinton Crosstown LRT, given that it is primarily underground. Ford acknowledged that he will need council's support to put an end to Transit City. In early 2012, Toronto City Council voted in favour of motions to resume work on the Sheppard, Eglinton and Finch LRT lines, and on replacing the Scarborough RT, defeating Rob Ford's campaign for subways.

The subway debate has continued in regards to the replacement of Line 3 Scarborough. Toronto City Council voted in June 2013 for a proposal to build the Scarborough subway extension. In light of this, Metrolinx threatened to stop work on Scarborough rapid transit, or even walk away from the project. Meanwhile, the Minister of Transportation Glen Murray was open to a modified project, as long as any costs that were additional to what the province originally committed. In September 2013, the Government of Ontario announced it would build a subway, but it would terminate at Scarborough Centre station, and consist of "a minimum" of two stops. The City of Toronto has moved forward with planning an extension of Line 2 Bloor–Danforth in Scarborough.

==== Subway projects ====
On 29 November 2012, Metrolinx CEO Bruce McCuaig announced two subway projects for Toronto region that would be pursued in the upcoming 15 years:

- Relief Line
- Yonge North subway extension

A TTC study was completed in 2012 to address existing capacity constraints on the existing Yonge subway and GO Transit lines. The study projected even with planned improvements on both networks, significant capacity issues would remain by 2031, recommending that a Downtown Relief Line be completed prior to the Yonge subway extension. The Big Move initially ranked the downtown relief line as lower priority, for completion within a 25-year time frame, and Metrolinx Chair Rob MacIsaac stated in 2008 that the line is unlikely to be brought forward from its projected 2020 start date. By March 2012, TTC CEO Andy Byford stressed there was great need for additional subway capacity with the increasing rate of population growth in Toronto, and capacity issues along Line 1 Yonge–University, stating "The downtown relief line has got to be looked at and has got to be talked about right now." Metrolinx accordingly stated that capacity issues may allow the DRL to be given higher priority in The Big Move, which was made official with the Phase 2 announcement.

=== Peel Region ===
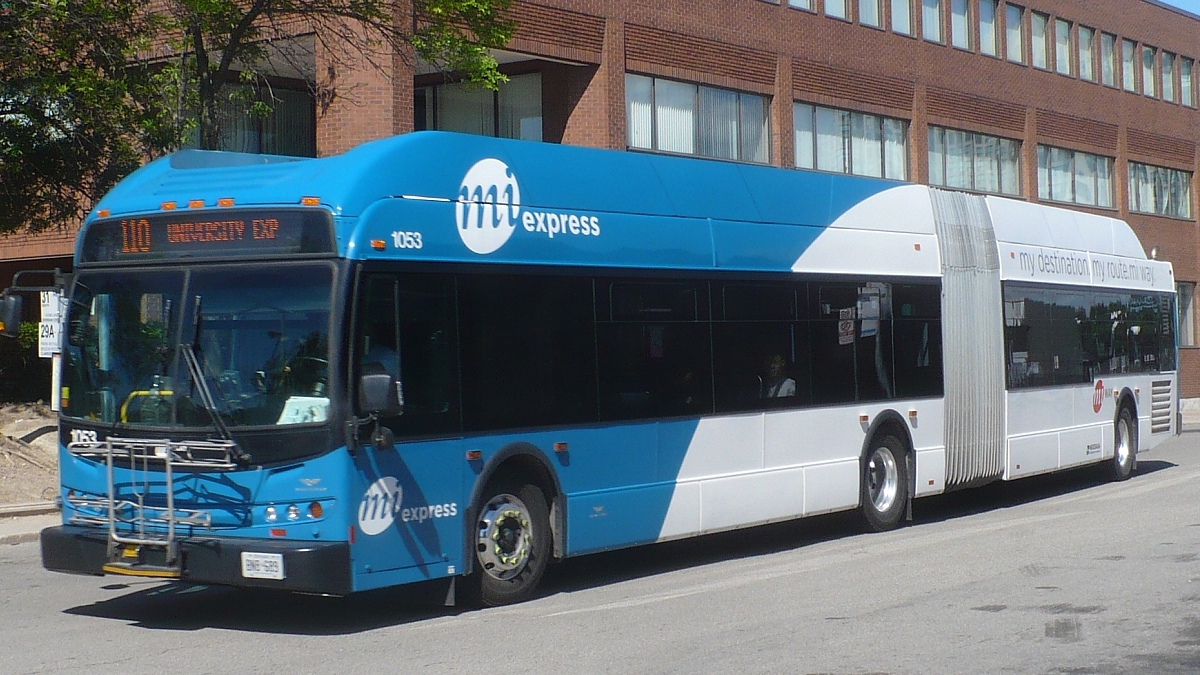
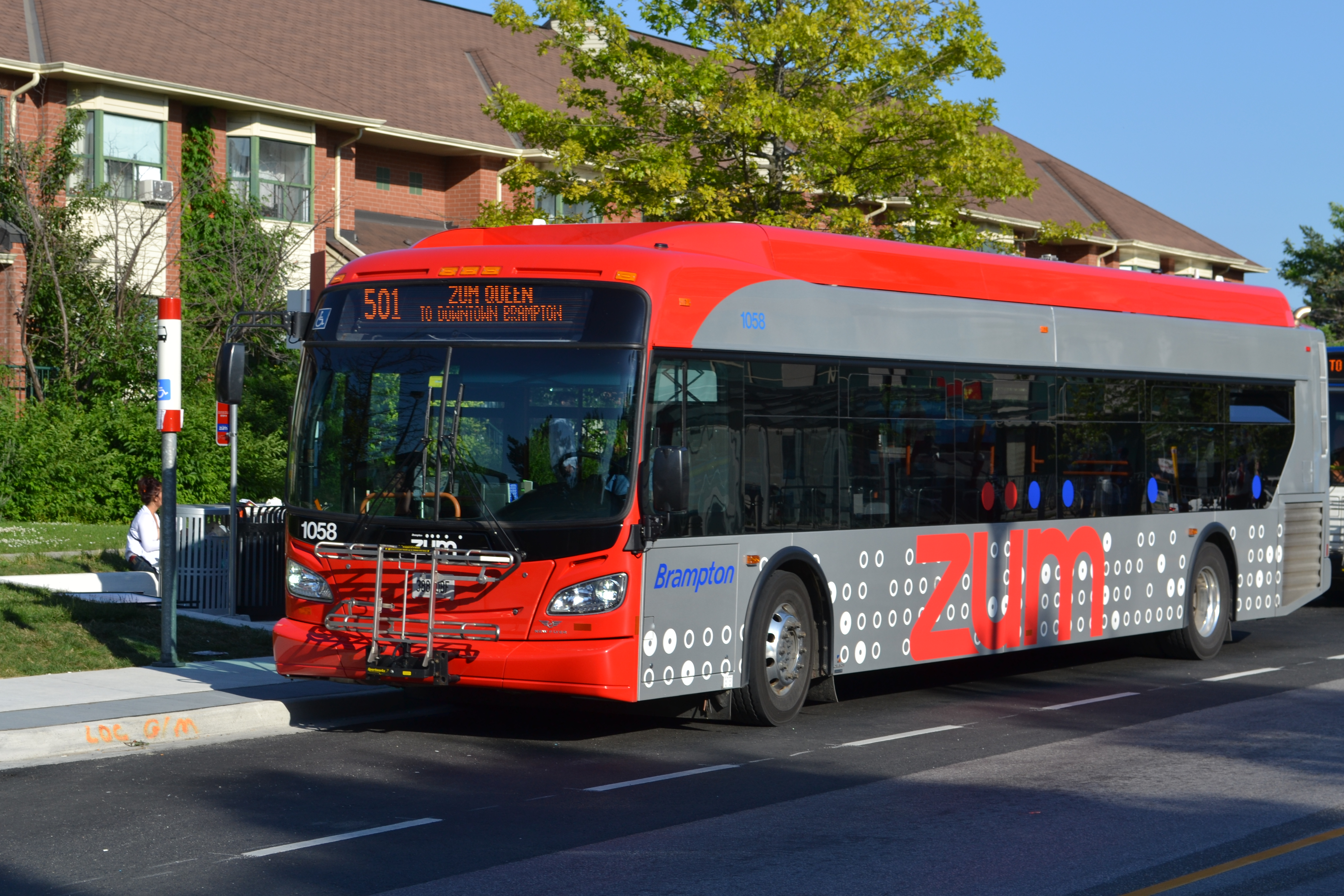
MiWay and Züm are the bus rapid transit providers for Mississauga and Brampton, respectively.

The Hurontario LRT in Mississauga and Brampton will represent a replacement of existing express bus services offered by MiWay and Züm. The line will run from Steeles Avenue in the north to Port Credit in the south. This will allow connections to GO Transit's Milton and Lakeshore West lines, and bus terminals at Brampton Gateway, Mississauga City Centre, Square One, and Mississauga Hospital. The LRT was planned to extend further north along Main Street to Brampton GO Station, but Brampton City Council voted against this portion of the route. Construction is expected to commence in 2018, and the line is projected to enter service in 2022.

The Mississauga Transitway is another rapidway being built along Highway 403, Eastgate Parkway and Eglinton Avenue is being built in a partnership between the City of Mississauga and GO Transit. The transit corridor will run east–west across Mississauga, with all-station stop and extensive express bus service for thousands of riders per day. Construction began on the 18-kilometre (11 mi) segment between Winston Churchill Boulevard and Renforth Drive in August 2010. The first stretch opened between Hurontario Street and Dixie Road on 17 November 2014, with the rest of the project targeted for opening in 2016.

=== Hamilton ===
The Hamilton LRT was identified as one of the top 15 priority projects in The Big Move, and along with the A-Line, was identified for completion within 15 years. These routes are also part of the larger HSR Next rapid transit proposal. The timelines for these projects have slipped significantly due to the initial cancellation of funding in 2019.

The Hamilton LRT will run between McMaster University and Eastgate Square. As of July 2025, a request for proposals has been published for early works, including utility relocation. No timeline has been provided for the A-Line route since the 2019 cancellation, and full environmental assessments have not been completed.

=== York Region ===
Metrolinx has also pursued constructing dedicated bus rapid transit (BRT) lanes, also known as "rapidways", for the Viva service in York region. Rapidways are one element of a $1.4 billion investment into York region's transit. The BRT service will include connections with GO Transit, regional transit and future extensions of the TTC subway system. Over 34 kilometres of rapidways are planned, with the goal of buses arriving every 2 to 5 minutes. Construction began in December 2009, and all elements are expected to be completed by 2020.
