= Don Mills LRT =

Proposed light rail line in Toronto, Canada

Overview
- Status: Cancelled
- Locale: Toronto, Ontario
- Termini: Pape station; Highway 7

Service
- Type: Light rail
- System: Toronto subway
- Operator: Toronto Transit Commission

Technical
- Line length: 17.6 kilometres (10.9 mi)
- Track gauge: 1,435 mm (4 ft 8 1/2 in)

The Don Mills LRT was a proposed light rail line in Toronto, Ontario, Canada. It was part of the Transit City proposal announced March 16, 2007, to be operated by the Toronto Transit Commission (TTC). It was expected to cost approximately $675 million, with construction to begin in 2012, and an expected opening in 2016. It would have been the fifth of the seven Transit City lines to be complete after the Sheppard East, Finch West, Waterfront West, and Eglinton lines. Ridership was estimated to be 21.2 million trips in 2021.

Mayor Rob Ford cancelled the line after taking office in December 2010. While LRT lines on Sheppard East, Finch West, and Eglinton were revived through a new agreement between the City of Toronto and Metrolinx, the Don Mills LRT was not included. The 925 Don Mills Express bus follows a similar routing to the proposed LRT.

The Don Mills LRT is still included in Metrolinx's regional transportation plan The Big Move under the 15-year horizon. Metrolinx has also completed a detailed benefits case analysis for the Relief Line, exploring the potential of constructing a subway instead of the Don Mills LRT to Don Mills station.

== Route layout ==
According to initial Toronto Transit Commission planning, the Don Mills LRT line would run for 17.6 kilometres (10.9 mi) between Steeles Avenue and Line 2 Bloor–Danforth. The LRT would operate via Don Mills Road from the north, and then turn east along Overlea Boulevard through the community of Thorncliffe Park. South of Thorncliffe Park, the TTC was examining three different alignments for the LRT to connect to the Line 2 subway, prior to cancellation of the project:

- Pape Avenue, via the Leaside Bridge, to Pape station;
- Broadview Avenue, via the Leaside Bridge, to Broadview station;
- Bayview Avenue, via Millwood Road and Southdale Drive, to Castle Frank station.

The Big Move proposes that the Don Mills LRT run along Pape Avenue to Pape station. It also proposes that the LRT stretch north past Steeles Avenue, along Leslie Street to Highway 7 in York Region.

=== Proposed stops/stations ===
The TTC did not indicate specific stops at the time of planning. The Big Move indicates that the line would intersect mobility hubs at Eglinton, Don Mills, Steeles, and Highway 407, and facilitate transfers to the Eglinton Crosstown line, Line 4 Sheppard, the Sheppard East LRT, an LRT or BRT line on Steeles, the 407 Transitway, and the Highway 7 Rapidway.

=== Relief Line ===
The Don Mills LRT was proposed to connect to the Relief Line (formerly Downtown Relief Line) at Pape station on Line 2 Bloor–Danforth, which was proposed to help reduce current and projected congestion in downtown Toronto. Metrolinx, the City of Toronto, York Region and the TTC partnered on the Yonge Relief Network Study (YRNS) in 2015, which examined options for providing relief on the Yonge line. This included three different versions of the Relief Line, and a surface LRT similar to the Don Mills LRT. The YRNS found that a subway between downtown and Sheppard Avenue would provide the most effective relief on the Yonge line. Pursuing this option would truncate the LRT south of Sheppard, and replace it with a subway.

The Relief Line proposal would eventually be replaced by the similar Ontario Line, which will instead extend further north to end at Don Valley station on Line 5 Eglinton. This would most likely truncate the Don Mills LRT proposal to end at that station instead.
