= HSR Next =

Proposed rapid transit system in Ontario, Canada

Overview
- Locale: Hamilton, Ontario, Canada
- Transit type: Light rail / bus rapid transit
- Number of lines: 6
- Website: (Re)envision the HSR

Operation
- Operators: Hamilton Street Railway (buses), TBD (LRT)

Technical
- Track gauge: 1,435 mm (4 ft 8 1/2 in) standard gauge

HSR Next is a plan for a frequent rapid transit system operated by the Hamilton Street Railway in the city of Hamilton, Ontario, Canada. The plans include an overhaul of the existing bus network, converting it from a hub-and-spoke network to a point-to-point network. Also included are six rapid routes, with one light rail transit (LRT) line, and five bus rapid transit (BRT) lines, alongside changes to local routes and additional on-demand transit zones. The system was approved by Hamilton City Council on September 15, 2025, and is planned for implementation beginning in 2027, with some changes such as transit hub construction planned through 2026.

== History ==
=== ICTS proposal (1981) ===
In 1981, during Bill Davis's Progressive Conservative administration, the Province of Ontario offered to finance the construction of a light metro in Hamilton from Lloyd D. Jackson Square to the Lime Ridge Mall. The line would have employed the ICTS platform used in the Scarborough RT in Toronto and the Expo Line in Vancouver. The plan, however, faced significant local opposition, and Hamilton-Wentworth Council rejected the proposal. The plan called for an elevated track – one of the elements that triggered opposition, with residents suggesting commuters would be invading their privacy by looking down on their backyards and in their second-floor windows.

=== BLAST network and Rapid Ready (2007–2019) ===
The BLAST network was a former iteration of Hamilton's transit network planning. It was initially proposed as part of the city's 2007 transportation master plan, with three lines which would become the BLAST A-, B-, and T-Lines. Other corridors, including the BLAST S-Line, were also identified for future expansion.

These corridors were later incorporated by Metrolinx as part of its regional transportation plan, The Big Move, approved in September 2008. The L-Line would not be conceived until an October 2008 report from city staff, at which point the network was given the BLAST name.

In February 2013, the City of Hamilton would release a transportation plan entitled Rapid Ready. Initially intended as a five year plan prior to the B-Line LRT delays, this report set out three main objectives to ensure effective usage of the LRT:

- improvement and reconfiguration of the transit network
- supportive community planning, including land use and density
- multi-modal integration

The B-Line LRT and A-Line were among The Big Move's prioritized transit expansion projects and were funded by the Government of Ontario in May 2015. Originally, the A-Line was planned to be a 2-kilometre (1.2 mi) light rail transit (LRT) spur from King Street to West Harbour GO Station, and potentially extending to Hamilton Harbour; however, this was reassessed and cut due to budget concerns and reported community desire for greater route coverage. The A-Line was henceforth planned as a bus rapid transit service from the waterfront to Hamilton Airport. Upon Metrolinx's 2041 Regional Transportation Plan being published in March 2018, the waterfront portion was dropped. The agency would recommend dedicated BRT from West Harbour GO to Rymal Road, and priority bus service from Rymal Road to the airport.

=== LRT defunding and revival, (Re)envision the HSR (2019–2025) ===
In January 2019, the City of Hamilton launched a project entitled (Re)envision the HSR to solicit feedback from the community on an improved system network. This was justified by the Rapid Ready plan's objectives of multi-modality and an LRT-supportive bus network.

Through 2019, Hamilton and Metrolinx were preparing to build the B-Line LRT. Land acquisition and building demolition for a 14-kilometre (8.7 mi) line from McMaster University to Eastgate Square had started.

On December 16, 2019, the Government of Ontario announced it was cancelling its funding for the LRT due to cost overruns. The provincial Ministry of Infrastructure noted that provincial funds originally planned for the Hamilton LRT project would be redistributed to other transportation infrastructure projects, with consultation with a newly formed Hamilton Transportation Task Force and Hamilton's city council.

On April 9, 2020, the Hamilton Transportation Task Force released the report, suggested that the city need a "higher order transit project", and it could be either LRT on B-Line or BRT on both A-Line and B-Line.

On February 9, 2021, the province reversed its decision and reinstated the project as the Hamilton LRT. City documents continue to refer to the LRT as the B-Line, however Metrolinx has discontinued use of this name. The current Route 10 B-Line Express, which runs along the same corridor, retains the moniker.

In July 2021, the city received $370 million from the provincial and federal governments to be used for the transportation network, alongside a $134 million contribution from the city. This included provisions for:

- a bus garage in the lower city and an accompanying rail bridge
- 85 new buses
- A-Line improvements, including signal priority, 5 queue jump lanes, 19 improved bus stops, and 17 kilometers of sidewalk
- 92 additional compressed natural gas buses
- dispatch and geolocation technology for real-time bus tracking
- active transportation improvements including bicycle infrastructure and a pedestrial bridge

By 2023, planning work on the (Re)envision the HSR project began to show fruits. According to a city report from April 2023, the BLAST network was insufficient due to incomplete links between high-use transit areas, poor connections, and poor access to rapid transit across Hamilton communities. The city claims the redesigned network will place approximately 309,000 residents will be within 800 metres (2,600 ft) of rapid transit, a 23% increase over the original BLAST network concept.

The project was an evolution of the BLAST network with the following changes:

- A new line, the E-Line, taking the place of the S-Line along Centennial Road
- A new line, the B-Line East, running between Eastgate Square and Winona Crossing
- Realignment of the S-Line along the Red Hill Valley Parkway to Parkdale LRT Station
- Extension of the L-Line to West Harbour GO Station, and to the Centre on Barton via Mohawk Road
- Realignment and extension of the T-Line, running between Heritage Greene and Downtown Dundas via Mohawk Road, Wilson Street and Main Street

The BLAST network branding would no longer be used in public-facing material but would continue to be used for internal planning leading up to HSR Next's announcement.

On November 6, 2024, Metrolinx released a request for qualifications for civil works and utilities along the LRT route, using an alliance delivery model. In May 2025, Metrolinx announced that four consortia had been shortlisted for the civil works and utilities package.

=== HSR Next (from 2025) ===
On June 24, 2025, Metrolinx hosted a virtual open house for the Hamilton LRT. During the presentation, Nicholas Chaloux, HSR manager of transit strategic planning, unveiled the resulting network of the (Re)envision the HSR initiative, branded as HSR Next. The plan intends to shift away from the existing hub-and-spoke network to a point-to-point network, improving efficiency and cutting trip times. The myRide on-demand service is also planned to be expanded to parts of Dundas, Ancaster, Glanbrook, Stoney Creek, more areas of Waterdown, and in the southeast portion of Hamilton Mountain from Heritage Greene Shopping Centre to Elfrida Gateway.

As part of the new point-to-point network, West Harbour GO Station is intended to become a new primary lower city terminal. The proposed alignment map shows no routes passing through the current Frank A. Cooke Transit Terminal, and the final report assumes that the terminal will be decommissioned, to be replaced with a transit hub along James Street. Travel from the Hamilton LRT to local GO Transit stations, as well as between transit hubs, will require no more than one transfer. Due to the scope of the plan, route changes are to be phased in gradually. The rapid bus lines retain the B-L-A-S-T-E letters in their naming, but route maps now feature the route numbering instead.

On September 15, 2025, Hamilton City Council unanimously approved the HSR Next proposal.

During the city's 2026 budget deliberations, HSR Next service changes were delayed to 2027. Some works such as transit hubs and new buses will continue to be rolled out through 2026.

== Proposed rapid transit lines ==
Timelines are subject to change.

Line	Type	Corridor / main route	Termini		Opening target	Frequency target (peak)	Additional notes
Hamilton LRT	LRT	Main Street, King Street, Queenston Road	McMaster University	Eastgate Square	TBA	Every 6 minutes	Often referred to by the city as the B-Line LRT. Owned by Metrolinx. Hamilton city council has recommended the line be operated privately (i.e. not by the HSR) for the first 10 years. Currently served by 10 B-Line Express.
B-Line East	BRT or priority bus	Queenston Road, Barton Street, Fifty Road	Eastgate Square	Winona Crossing	By end of Year 4	Every 20 minutes	Runs express service between Eastgate Square and Stoney Creek Gateway, local service to Winona Crossing. Displayed as a rapid line on city maps, but listed as non-express Route 74 on final report. Currently served by 55 Stoney Creek Central.
A-Line	BRT and priority bus	James Street, Upper James Street	Pier 8 Waterfront	Hamilton International Airport	Currently implemented as express/local bus	Every 10 minutes	Currently known as 20 A-Line Express, operating local service between Pier 8 and Mohawk College, as well as between Mountain Transit Centre and the airport. Express service between Mohawk College and Mountain Transit Centre. Improvements are planned between West Harbour GO Station and the airport. Planned to exclusively operate 60 foot articulated buses by end of Year 1.
S-Line	Priority bus	Queenston Road, Red Hill Valley Parkway, Upper Red Hill Valley Parkway, Rymal Road, Garner Road	Parkdale LRT Station	Ancaster Gateway	Partial service by end of Year 2, full service by end of Year 4	Every 10 minutes	Express service between Parkdale LRT Station and Redeemer University, local service to Ancaster Gateway. Planned to exclusively operate 60 foot articulated buses by end of Year 5. Currently served by 11 Parkdale and 44 Rymal.
E-Line	Priority bus	Centennial Parkway, Upper Centennial Parkway, Rymal Road, Upper Red Hill Valley Parkway	Confederation GO Station	Heritage Greene	Partial service by end of Year 2, full service by end of Year 5	Every 10 minutes	Express service between Confederation GO and Elfrida Gateway, and between Rymal / Upper RHVP and Heritage Greene. Local service along Rymal Road. Planned to exclusively operate 60 foot articulated buses by end of Year 6. Currently served by 44 Rymal.
T-Line	Priority bus	Cootes Drive, Main Street West, Golf Links Road, Mohawk Road, Limeridge Road	Downtown Dundas	Heritage Greene	By end of Year 7	Every 10 minutes	Express service between McMaster University and Wilson Street East/Rousseaux Road, as well as between Meadowlands and Heritage Greene. Local service between McMaster University and Downtown Dundas, as well as between Wilson Street East/Rousseaux Road and Meadowlands. Currently served by 5(A) Delaware, 41 Mohawk, 42 Mohawk East, and 21 Upper Kenilworth.
L-Line	Priority bus	Highway 6, York Boulevard, James Street, Upper James Street, Mohawk Road East, Upper Ottawa Street, Ottawa Street	The Centre on Barton	Waterdown Gateway	Partial short-turn service between Cityview Park (Burlington) and Lime Ridge Mall by end of Year 3, full service by end of Year 5	Every 20 minutes	Express service. Currently served within Hamilton by 41 Mohawk, and partially served to Waterdown by 9 Rock Gardens and 18 Waterdown.
L-Line	Priority bus	James Street, Upper James Street, Mohawk Road East, Upper Ottawa Street, Ottawa Street	The Centre on Barton	West Harbour GO Station	Partial short-turn service between Cityview Park (Burlington) and Lime Ridge Mall by end of Year 3, full service by end of Year 5	Every 10 minutes	Express service. Currently served by 41 Mohawk and 20 A-Line Express.

Prior to the 2019 defunding, the A-Line and B-Line projects were originally targeted to be completed in 2024.

A contract for civil and utility works for the Hamilton LRT was awarded to Hamilton Transit Alliance on April 30, 2026. Following the issuance of the contract, Metrolinx and the consortium will work on detailed design for approximately 18 months prior to starting construction. No updated target date for opening has been released.
