= Hamilton LRT =

Planned light rail line in Hamilton, Ontario, Canada

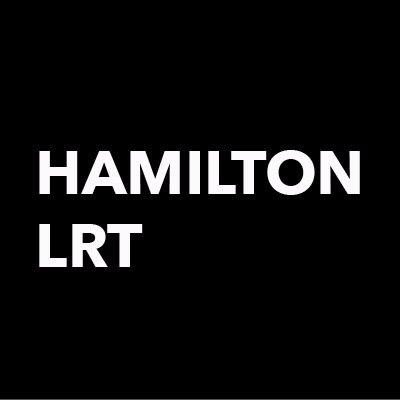

Overview
- Status: Planned
- Owner: Metrolinx
- Locale: Hamilton, Ontario
- Termini: McMaster University; Eastgate Square
- Stations: 17
- Website: Official website

Service
- Type: Light rail
- System: HSR Next

History
- Planned opening: TBD

Technical
- Line length: 14 kilometres (8.7 mi)
- Character: At-grade
- Track gauge: 1,435 mm (4 ft 8 1/2 in) standard gauge

The Hamilton LRT (sometimes known as the B-Line LRT) is a planned light rail line in Hamilton, Ontario, Canada, to operate along Main Street, King Street, and Queenston Road. It is one of six rapid transit lines which form Hamilton's planned HSR Next network. The 14 km (8.7 mi), 17-stop route is planned to extend from McMaster University to Eastgate Square via downtown Hamilton.

The LRT was originally funded by the province of Ontario in 2015 and in 2018 Infrastructure Ontario issued a request for proposals to design and construct the project. However, in December 2019 the province cancelled procurement citing rising costs. In May 2021, the project received funding from the provincial and federal governments allowing to project to advance to procurement and construction. Enabling works including utility relations began in 2024 and a request for proposals for the main civil works was issued in May 2025.

== Route layout ==
The western terminus is to be built on Main Street in front of McMaster University. The line will continue east until Dundurn Street, where it will turn north to access King Street. After turning back east on King Street, the line continues through downtown Hamilton. At the King–Main intersection, the line will continue on Main Street until Queenston Circle and then Queenston Road until Eastgate Square.

=== Stops ===
Stop	Platform type	Notes
McMaster	Side (Note: Platforms located north of the road)	Connection to McMaster University Bus Terminal
Longwood	Island	
Dundurn	Island (Note: Platforms located west of the road)	Located east of a spur line leading to OMSF
Queen	Island (Note: Platforms located south of the road)	
James	Island (Note: Platforms located south of the road)	Connection to MacNab Transit Terminal and Hamilton GO Centre
Mary	Island (Note: Platforms located north of the road)	
Wellington	Island	
Wentworth	Island	
Sherman	Island	
Scott Park	Side (Note: Platforms located north of the road)	
Gage Park	Side (Note: Platforms located north of the road)	
Ottawa	Island	
Kenilworth	Island	
Queenston	Island	
Parkdale	Island	
Nash	Split	
Eastgate	Side (Note: Platforms located north of the road)	Connection to Eastgate Transit Terminal

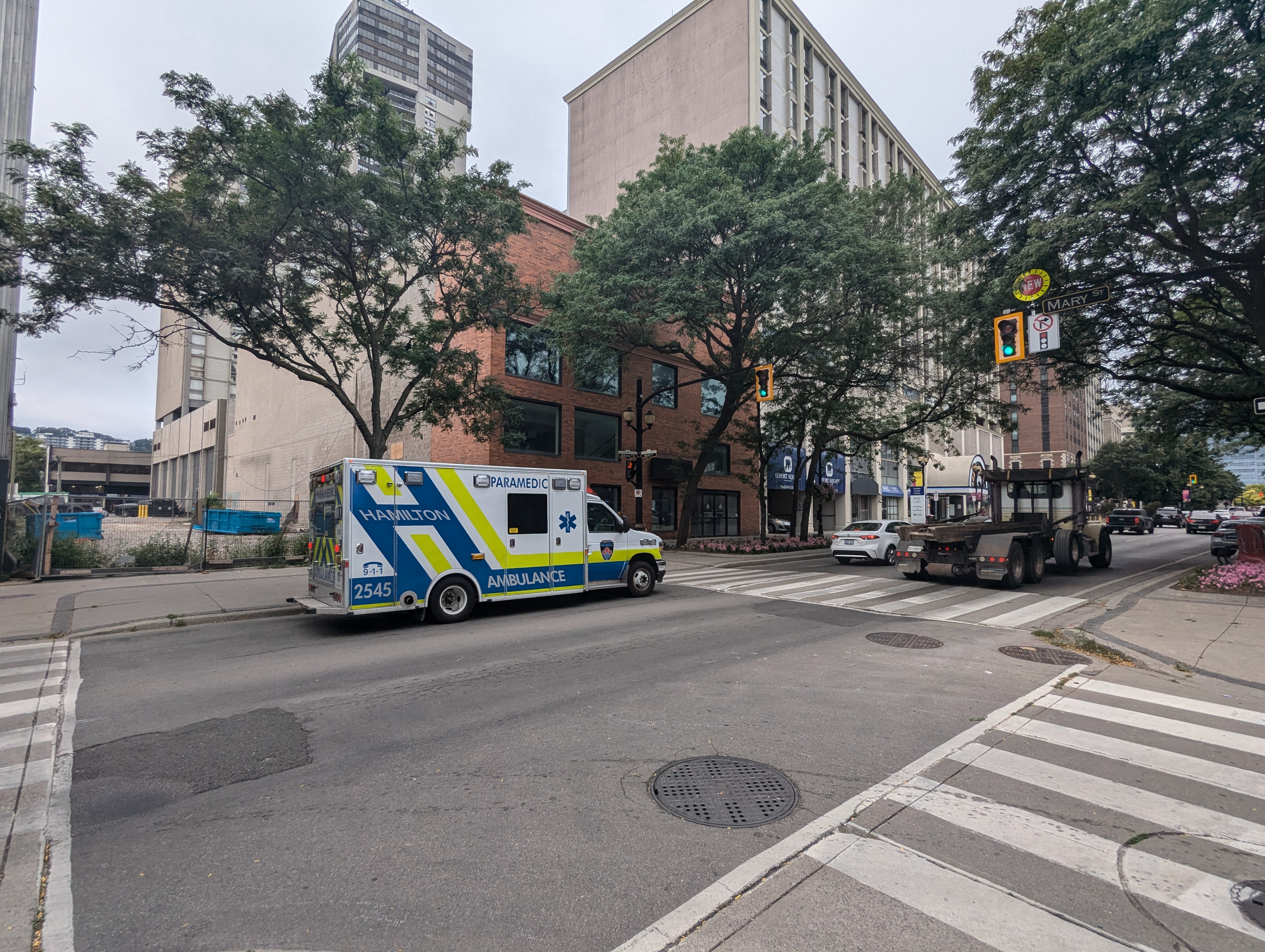
The intersection of King Street East and Mary Street in downtown Hamilton, looking southwest. This is a future LRT stop location.

Notes
All stops are located along the street's median except where noted below.

== History ==
=== Planning and funding (2011–2017) ===
A benefits case analysis was conducted, showing a net benefit for implementing LRT, and that it would be adequate dealing with long-term travel demand growth. An environmental project report was completed in October 2011.

On May 26, 2015, the Government of Ontario announced a shorter route between McMaster University and Queenston Circle, but also including a segment of the A-Line to provide a direct connection to West Harbour GO Station, as well as a pedestrian corridor to the Hamilton GO Centre. The capital costs for the project would be $1 billion, funded entirely by the province. For the B-Line LRT, procurement was expected to begin in 2017 and line construction in 2019. The transit line was scheduled to open to the public in 2024.

On February 2, 2017, the province scrapped the A-Line spur altogether, announcing it would opt for bus rapid transit along the entire A-Line corridor from Hamilton's waterfront to the airport. On March 28, 2017, Hamilton City Council chose to delay the crucial Environmental Assessment vote to April 19, 2017, citing they needed more time to read it for themselves. On April 19, 2017, City Council voted again to delay the Environmental Assessment, this time to April 26, 2017, claiming the plan at that stage (which was to build Phase 1 from McMaster University to Queenston traffic circle) was indefensible and unfit as it did not go from a destination location to a destination location.

On April 26, 2017, the province announced with the money saved from removing the spur line from King and James to the West Harbour GO Station, they would work with the city to get the 3 km (1.9 mi) Eastgate Square extension included in the capital funding. Later that evening City Council voted to submit the original Environmental Assessment from October 2011 which covers the original route from McMaster University to Eastgate Square. The motion to submit the original Environmental Assessment was by Terry Whitehead, who was one of the project's harshest critics. The motion passed 10–5, with Councillor Robert Pasuta absent.

On August 4, 2017, the Ontario Ministry of the Environment and Climate Change approved the Environmental Project Report (EPR) Addendum for Hamilton's Light Rail Transit (LRT) plan.

=== Initial procurement and cancellation (2017–2019) ===
In 2018, before its election defeat, the previous Liberal government knew that the project cost had increased from $1 billion (established in 2014) to $2.85 billion, according to the Progressive Conservative government that succeeded it. However, Metrolinx continued to show the cost as $1 billion until late 2019. On August 30, 2018, property acquisitions and other spending related to the project were put on hold by the newly elected provincial government. About 50 percent of the properties still needed to be purchased before completing the light rail line.

Light rail was a key issue in the 2018 Hamilton municipal election. Mayoral challenger Vito Sgro campaigned primarily on a platform of cancelling the B-Line project while incumbent mayor Fred Eisenberger was pro-LRT. On October 22, 2018, Eisenberger was re-elected to a second consecutive term (and third overall) receiving 54% of votes and claimed that the results indicated a "strong mandate on LRT to move forward."

On March 29, 2019, Ontario Transit Minister Jeff Yurek announced that project-related spending could resume after an eight-month freeze. He indicated that Metrolinx could now continue to purchase land along the route needed for LRT construction. Four days later, Metrolinx announced the purchase of a 14.5-acre property which will be the site of an operations, maintenance and storage facility (OMSF) for the light rail vehicles.

Infrastructure Ontario (IO) and Metrolinx planned to deliver the Hamilton LRT project according to IO's Alternative Financing and Procurement (AFP) model which basically is a public–private partnership arrangement. On February 2, 2017, Metrolinx and Infrastructure Ontario issued the request for qualifications to shortlist proponents to respond to a request for proposals. On April 16, 2018, teams shortlisted by IO and Metrolinx allowed to bid on designing, building, financing, operating, and maintaining the LRT were:

- CityLine Transit Group, a consortium including ACS, Aecon, Dragados, Parsons and Serco.
- Ei8ht Transit, a consortium including EllisDon, Fluor, Bombardier, WSP and Hatch
- Mobilinx, a consortium including Astaldi, John Laing, Hitachi-Ansaldo STS, Transdev and Amico.

The procurement of a dedicated fleet of light rail vehicles and the construction of a maintenance and storage facility were included in the deal. The deadline to submit bids was originally scheduled for April 2019 but was later extended by six months.

==== Project cancellation ====
On December 16, 2019, Doug Ford's government told the City of Hamilton that the project would be terminated "effective immediately", because the estimated cost of the project had risen to an "astonishing $5.5 billion". The Mayor of Hamilton, Fred Eisenberger, called the cancellation "a betrayal by the province to the City of Hamilton." The capital expenditures had increased from $1 billion excluding financing as of 2014 to $2.85 billion including financing at the time of project cancellation. The province also added the 30-year estimated cost of $1 billion for operations and maintenance to the capital and financing costs. The City of Hamilton would have been expected to pay the LRT's operating and maintenance costs. The province had already spent $184 million on the project including the acquisition of 60 properties. Consortiums who were competing to construct the LRT would be entitled to compensation as a result of the cancellation. Transportation Minister Caroline Mulroney said the province had cancelled the Hamilton LRT, but not the Hurontario LRT with similar costs, because the Hurontario project was further along and bidders on the Hamilton LRT had raised concerns about costs.

As a consolation, the provincial government offered the city $1 billion (the original estimated cost of the LRT line) to spend on other transit improvements. To this end, the provincial government set up a task force to decide on the best use for the money. In March 2020, the task force reported their preference for the funds to be spent on higher-order transit (such as light rail or bus rapid transit) along the Hamilton LRT route.

=== Project revival (2020–present) ===
In November 2020, there was talk of the project being revived. During an announcement in Hamilton, Ontario, Premier Doug Ford said he had been working closely with Hamilton mayor Fred Eisenberger on the file but said they would need funding support from the federal government to move forward with it. The following day, then federal Minister of Infrastructure and Communities Catherine McKenna said she supported the project, and that it was up to the province to formally endorse the LRT project and submit a business case for the federal government to review. Laborers' International Union of North America's Joseph Mancinelli cited the project as an ideal stimulant of economic recovery during the COVID-19 pandemic in Ontario.

On February 9, 2021, the province confirmed its commitment to the project and added the Hamilton LRT to its slate of priority transit projects in the GTHA. The proposed route would be a shorter 9 kilometres (5.6 mi) kilometre line between McMaster University and Gage Avenue and would require an additional $1.5 billion in funding from the federal government.

On May 11, 2021, then Prime Minister Justin Trudeau announced $1.7 billion in federal funding for the Hamilton project. The capital costs would be split equally between the federal and provincial governments for the full 14-kilometre route. On June 2, 2021, Metrolinx and the Ontario Ministry of Transportation met with Hamilton city council to discuss operating costs (which would be funded by the city) and to agree to negotiate a memorandum of understanding (MOU). After a two-week delay, council voted 9–6 in favour of negotiating the MOU and proceeding with the LRT project. From this point, Metrolinx would change the name of the project from B-Line LRT to Hamilton LRT; however, the city continues to refer to the corridor as B-Line.

In October 2023, Metrolinx appointed AECOM to serve as the technical advisor for its Hamilton LRT.

By November 2023, Metrolinx introduced a design change affecting access to the planned Operations, Maintenance and Storage (OMSF) facility on Chatham Street as well as a change in alignment of the mainline. The mainline would cross Highway 403 via a rebuilt and widened Main Street bridge instead of via a rail-only flyover bridge. This change followed a decision by the City of Hamilton to convert Main Street from one-way to two-way traffic and is intended to save cost. Access to the OMSF will be via Frid Street instead of via the busier Longwood Road. The mainline would shift from Main Street west to King Street via Dundurn Street, adding two 90 degree turns to the route. The Dundurn stop would be relocated along Dundurn Street to be closer to Hamilton's Innovation District instead of along King Street.

In May 2024, city council voted to endorse a private operator to work with the future design–build consortium to build the LRT and to privately operate the system for 10 years, at which point the LRT can then be transitioned to Hamilton Street Railway for public operations. However, as project owner and sponsor, the decision ultimately lies with Metrolinx on what governance model to pursue.

==== Procurement ====
On June 2, 2023, Metrolinx and city staff presented a project update to the City of Hamilton's LRT sub-committee, in which Metrolinx recommended a different delivery model and contract-packaging strategy from what was previously contemplated under the former procurement process. Instead of procuring project partners to deliver all aspects of the project by adopting a public–private partnership (P3) contracting model, Metrolinx recommended splitting up the Hamilton LRT project into 3 packages and using different contract delivery methods following feedback from the market to decrease project risk, strengthen stakeholder management and improve the alignment between civil and systems scope. The 3 packages recommended were:

1. Advance enabling works: Early strategic relocation of select private and public utilities (mainly off corridor)
2. Package 1 – civil works and utilities (Alliance): Assets that are primarily third-party are designed, constructed, commissioned and handed over to asset owners. The proponent would also conduct works related to private and public utilities (relocation and renewal of longitudinal utilities), civil structures (e.g. bridges, grade separations), roadworks and the urban realm (e.g. streetscape, pedestrian and cycling facilities, and Hamilton Street Railway integration).
3. Package 2 – stops, rail and systems (delivery model TBD): Works related to LRT guideway, rail, and systems, as well as the operations, maintenance and storage facility (OMSF) and integration of light-rail vehicles (LRVs) for revenue service. Metrolinx was in discussions with the city about the potential to include operations and maintenance as part of this contract. If included, this package may be delivered as a P3 design–build–finance–operate–maintain (DBFOM).

On November 6, 2024, Metrolinx released a request for qualifications for civil works and utilities, using an Alliance delivery model. In May 2025, Metrolinx announced that four consortia had been shortlisted for civil works and utilities package.

- Hamilton Synergy Alliance, consortium led by AtkinsRéalis
- Steel City Alliance, consortium led by Dufferin Construction Co
- Kenaidan Murphy Joint Venture, consortium led by Murphy Infrastructure
- Hamilton Transit Alliance, consortium led by Aecon Infrastructure Management

On April 30, 2026, the Ontario government awarded the civil and utilities package contract to Hamilton Transit Alliance.

== Operations ==
- The Hamilton LRT route is currently served by the 10 B-Line Express HSR bus.
- The trip is expected to take 32 minutes from end-to-end running at a frequency of every 6 minutes during peak hours.
- The 14 km (8.7 mi) route will include 17 stops placed approximately 600–800 metres apart.
- An operations, maintenance and storage facility (OMSF) is planned along Chatham Street to be accessed south from Main Street via Frid Street. The OMSF will have a shed for vehicle cleaning and maintenance, an office building and an employee parking lot.
