= A-Line (Hamilton) =

Bus express line in Hamilton, Ontario

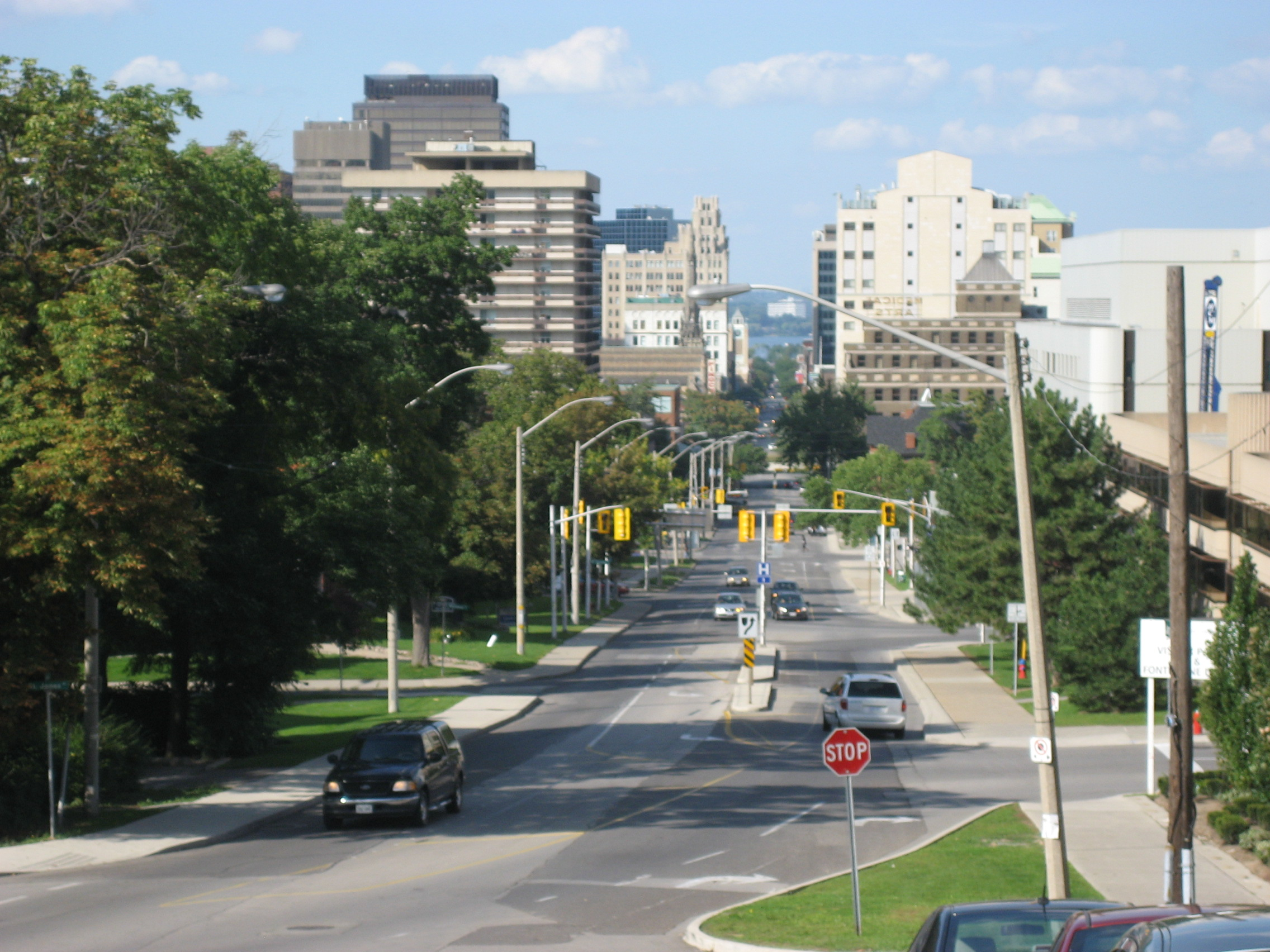
- James Street South, looking north

Overview
- System: HSR Next
- Status: Proposed

Route
- Route type: Rapid transit
- Locale: Hamilton, Ontario
- Start: Waterfront
- Via: West Harbour GO, Hamilton GO, Mohawk College
- End: Hamilton International Airport
- Length: 16 km (10 mi)
- Stops: 21 (tentative)

The A-Line is a proposed rapid transit line running along James Street in downtown and Upper James Street on the escarpment in Hamilton, Ontario. It is one of six rapid transit lines which form Hamilton's planned HSR Next network. It was previously identified by Metrolinx in its regional transportation plan The Big Move as a project to be completed by 2023. The route is currently served by Hamilton Street Railway's Route 20 A-Line Express bus.

== History ==
During planning, both bus rapid transit (BRT) and light rail transit (LRT) were considered for the corridor. On May 26, 2015, the Government of Ontario announced the B-Line LRT would be constructed between McMaster University and Queenston Circle, as well as a short LRT segment of the A-Line to provide a direct connection to West Harbour GO Station from King Street.

On February 2, 2017, the province removed the 2 kilometres (1.2 mi) A-Line LRT spur from the B-Line construction scope. In its stead, the province proposed advancing the planning and environmental assessment of a 16 kilometres (9.9 mi) BRT along the entire A-Line corridor, from Hamilton's waterfront to Hamilton Airport.

On March 8, 2018, Metrolinx released the 2041 Regional Transportation Plan (2041 RTP) for the Greater Toronto and Hamilton Area (GTHA), superseding the previous RTP completed ten years earlier (The Big Move). The 2041 RTP recommends removing the waterfront portion of the corridor and constructing a BRT from West Harbour GO to Rymal Road and a priority bus from Rymal Road to Hamilton Airport.

On July 19, 2021, the federal, provincial, and municipal governments announced funding for upgrades to the A-Line corridor. The proposed works include construction of five queue jump lines and 17 km (11 mi) of sidewalks, implementation of transit signal priority measures at select intersections, and improvements to approximately 19 transit stops along the corridor.
