= 407 Transitway =

Planned Bus Rapid Transit system in Ontario, Canada

Overview
- Locale: Greater Toronto Area, Ontario, Canada
- Transit type: Bus rapid transit

The 407 Transitway was a bus rapid transit system (BRT) planned along Ontario Highway 407, spanning the Greater Toronto Area between Brant Street in Burlington, and Enfield Road in Durham Region.

Planning for the 407 Transitway has occurred for five segments:

- Brant Street to Hurontario Street
- Hurontario Street to Highway 400
- Highway 400 to Kennedy Road
- Kennedy Road to Brock Road
- Brock Road to Enfield Road

In the Metrolinx's 2041 Regional Transportation Plan from March 2018, the 407 Transitway is excluded, and appears only under the section, "Projects beyond 2041 (not mapped)", with only the Hurontario Rd. - Brock Rd. segment listed.

== See also ==
- Highway 427 BRT
