= Steeles Avenue bus rapid transit =

Steeles Bus Rapid Transit

Overview
- Status: Proposed
- Locale: Toronto, Ontario
- Termini: Pioneer Village station; Morningside Avenue

Service
- System: Toronto Transit Commission
- Operator(s): Toronto Transit Commission

Technical
- Line length: 22 kilometres (14 mi)

A rapid transit corridor is proposed along Steeles Avenue in Toronto, Ontario, Canada, which would be operated by the Toronto Transit Commission. It has not been determined if this corridor would be a bus rapid transit or a light rail transit line. It is identified by Metrolinx in its regional transportation plan The Big Move as a project to be completed in its 25-year plan. In February 2016, City of Toronto and TTC planners recommended implementing the Steeles BRT/LRT within a 15-year horizon. At a meeting on February 20, 2020, the Metrolinx board of directors endorsed a prioritization framework for a proposed Frequent Rapid Transit Network that included a proposed BRT from Pioneer Village station to McCowan Road. The proposed 20.8 km line along Steeles Avenue had a forecasted ridership of 11,700 in 2031. The project scored 'high' with a preliminary benefit-cost ratio of over 0.90.

The TTC released their 2020–2024 5-year Service Plan and 10-year Outlook, which discussed the implementation of exclusive bus lanes, stop consolidation, all-door boarding and other transit priority measures to speed up bus service on Steeles Avenue West between Pioneer Village station and the future Steeles station that will be constructed as part of the Yonge North Subway Extension. Currently, the implementation timeframe is to be determined following feedback on the RapidTO Eglinton East Bus Lanes and public consultation with the surrounding community. On March 20, 2024, City of Toronto staff presented a report to City Council on corridor evaluation results for the prioritization of planned higher-order transit projects, which yielded the following results for a BRT on Steeles Avenue: (1) Pioneer Village station to Bathurst Street (highest priority); (2) Bathurst Street to Bayview Avenue (second highest); (3) Bayview Avenue to Milliken GO Station (third highest); and (4) Milliken GO Station to Morningside Avenue (fourth highest).
