= 427 Transitway =

Overview
- Other name: Highway 427 North / South BRT
- Status: Proposed
- Locale: Toronto/Mississauga, Ontario
- Termini: Kipling station Pearson Airport; Renforth station Highway 7

Technical
- Line length: 17 kilometres (11 mi)

A bus rapid transit (BRT) corridor is proposed on Highway 427 as part of Metrolinx's regional transportation plan for the Greater Toronto and Hamilton Area, The Big Move. This BRT line would be established in two separate segments. The southern segment would begin at the Toronto Transit Commission's Kipling Station on Line 2 and proceed north along Highway 427 to Renforth station, the eastern terminus of the Mississauga Transitway. This southern segment would help augment the existing 900 Airport Express bus service. The northern segment would start at Toronto Pearson International Airport, and proceed non-stop to bus rapidways on Highway 7 in York Region and Queen Street in Brampton.

The extension of Highway 427 to Major Mackenzie Drive includes a dedicated three station right-of-way on the west side with terminus and loop located north of Major Mackenzie.
