= Dundas Street bus rapid transit =

Proposed Canadian bus rapid transit line

Dundas BRT

Overview
- Owner: Metrolinx (Government of Ontario)
- Locale: Toronto, Mississauga, Oakville, Burlington, Hamilton
- Transit type: Bus rapid transit
- Number of stations: 9 confirmed stations, 8 possible stations being looked into in Peel Region
- Website: https://www.metrolinx.com/en/projects-and-programs/dundas-brt

Operation
- Operation will start: Expected to begin construction in 2026
- Operators: Expected: GO Transit, TTC, MiWay, Oakville Transit, Burlington Transit, Hamilton Street Railway
- Character: At-grade, on street median between the west-bound lanes and east-bound lanes of Dundas Street

Technical
- System length: 48 km (30 mi)

The Dundas Street bus rapid transit is a proposed bus rapid transit (BRT) corridor proposed by Metrolinx for the western part of the Greater Toronto and Hamilton Area in Southern Ontario, Canada. It is part of the regional transportation plan The Big Move. Metrolinx currently refers to the project as Dundas BRT without the word "Street". The City of Mississauga used the brand Dundas Connects during the development phase.

The Dundas BRT is planned to run along Dundas Street from the Kipling Bus Terminal, which connects to Line 2 Bloor–Danforth in Etobicoke, Toronto, to Highway 6 in the neighbourhood of Waterdown in Hamilton. The line will pass through the cities of Mississauga, Oakville, and Burlington. The BRT would also make connections with GO Transit's Milton line and the future Hurontario LRT. The busway will be 48 kilometres (30 miles) long with about 20 kilometres (12 miles) to be located in bus lanes or a dedicated right-of-way The estimated capital cost is $600 million.

== Mississauga ==
As of 2021, Metrolinx proposed eight BRT stops along Dundas Street between Wharton Way and Confederation Parkway, while in 2018, Mississauga had planned eighteen, within its city limits.

Metrolinx has identified two pinch points along the BRT within Mississauga at Cooksville and Erindale Valley. The BRT right-of-way in Cookville between Jaguar Valley Drive and Confederation Parkway is constrained by buildings (including some heritage properties) located close to the street. Metrolinx prefers constructing six lanes on Dundas Street through Cooksville with the two centre lanes reserved for buses.

The Erindale Valley has a pinch point due to the need to protect the environment around the Credit River Valley and Erindale Park. There are also several heritage sites between The Credit Woodlands and Mississauga Road.

On March 5, 2022, Prime Minister Justin Trudeau, along with Mississauga Mayor Bonnie Crombie and Ontario's Associate Minister of Transportation Stan Cho, announced a CA$675,000,000 joint investment for transit projects in Mississauga that includes funding for the Dundas BRT.

== Burlington ==
A 2008 Metrolinx report proposed that the Dundas BRT have its western terminus at Brant Street in Burlington, where it would connect to a proposed Brant Street bus rapid transit proceeding south to Burlington GO Station. However, as of 2021, the current webpage for the Dundas BRT makes no mention of a Brant Street BRT, and the proposed western terminal of the Dundas BRT is Highway 6 in Hamilton.

== See also ==
- Durham–Scarborough bus rapid transit
