= Brant Street bus rapid transit =

Brant Rapid transit

Overview
- Locale: Burlington, Ontario, Canada
- Transit type: TBD

In 2008, Metrolinx proposed a rapid transit corridor on Brant Street in Burlington, Ontario as part of their regional transportation plan called The Big Move. Rapid transit on Brant Street was to provide connections to GO Transit's Lakeshore West line, and the proposed Dundas Street BRT. The project was to be implemented in two separate segments:

- Brant rapid transit - Dundas Street to Burlington GO Station
- Burlington Connector - Burlington GO Station to Downtown Burlington

However, as of 2021, the current webpage for the Dundas Street BRT makes no mention of a Brant Street BRT.
