= Request for qualifications =

A request for qualifications (RFQ) is a step sometimes used in the formal process of procuring a product or service, for example by a government agency. It is typically used as a screening step to establish a pool of vendors (businesses or individuals to provide a product or service) that are then qualified, and thus eligible to submit responses to a request for proposals (RFP). In this two-step process, the response to the RFQ will describe the company or individual's general qualifications to perform a service or supply a product but generally will not include specific details or price proposals.

== Benefits of including an RFQ step ==
For the procurer, an RFQ provides a pre-screening step, so at the request for proposal phase there are fewer proposals to evaluate. The Request for Qualifications thus becomes a means by which the purchasing agency can add vendors to their select sellers list, i.e. list of vendors eligible to bid.

For the respondent, they do not spend the time and effort to write a full proposal only to find out they were not qualified as a firm.

In some jurisdictions, the RFQ is a required step for some types of procurement. In the United States, the Federal Highway Administration denotes a request for qualifications as a "phase one solicitation" for design–build projects.
