= Eastgate Square =

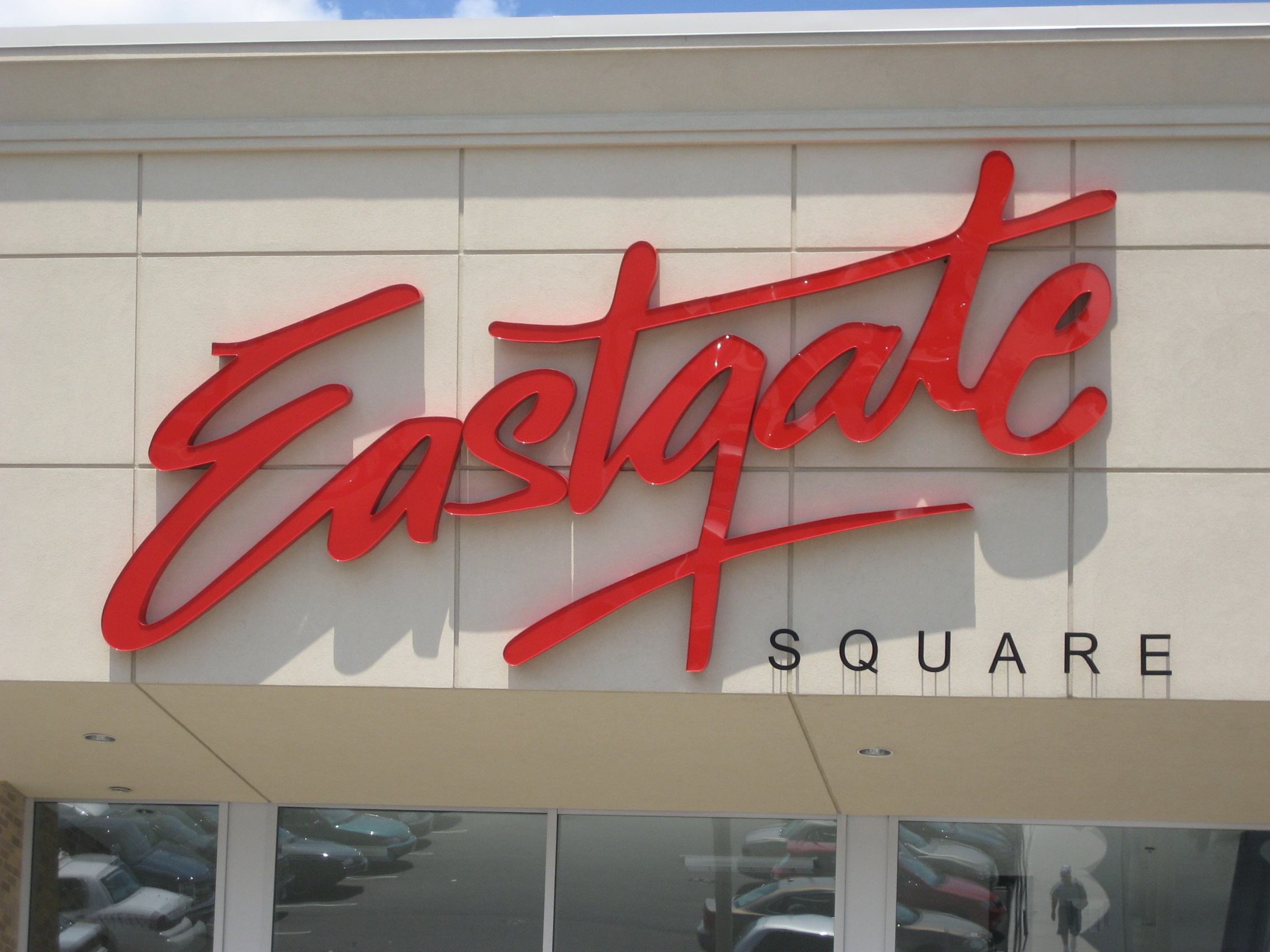
- Location: Hamilton, Ontario, Canada
- Coordinates: 43.231°N 79.765°W
- Address: 75 Centennial Parkway North
- Opened: 1973
- Owner: Harrison Equity Partners
- Num. of stores: 100+
- Num. of anchor tenants: 5 Fortinos (88,354 sq ft); HomeSense (24,374 sq ft); Shoppers Drug Mart (15,383 sqft); Winners (24,655 sq ft); Sports Check (21,062 sq ft)
- Floors: 1
- Website: eastgatesquare.ca

Eastgate Square is an indoor shopping mall in Stoney Creek, Hamilton, Ontario, Canada. The mall is bounded by Queenston Road (South), Centennial Parkway (East), Delawana Drive (North) and Kenora Avenue (West).

The Mall is managed by Cushman and Wakefield (Canada) LP. and offers over 100 stores and services including Fortinos, HomeSense and Shoppers Drug Mart.

== History ==
Eastgate Square opened in 1973 with Woolco, Eaton's, and Robinson's as its anchors.

One of the mall's busiest anchor stores, Walmart (formerly Woolco), had announced it was relocating to a site roughly 2 kilometres away to 510 Centennial Parkway North at corner of the QEW/South Service Road junction. The new Walmart Supercentre location opened on January 27, 2012.

The area vacated by Walmart has been renovated to create a new retail wing, with stores including Winners, Dollarama, and Sport Chek. The new wing opened on August 20, 2013.

== Eastgate Transit Terminal ==
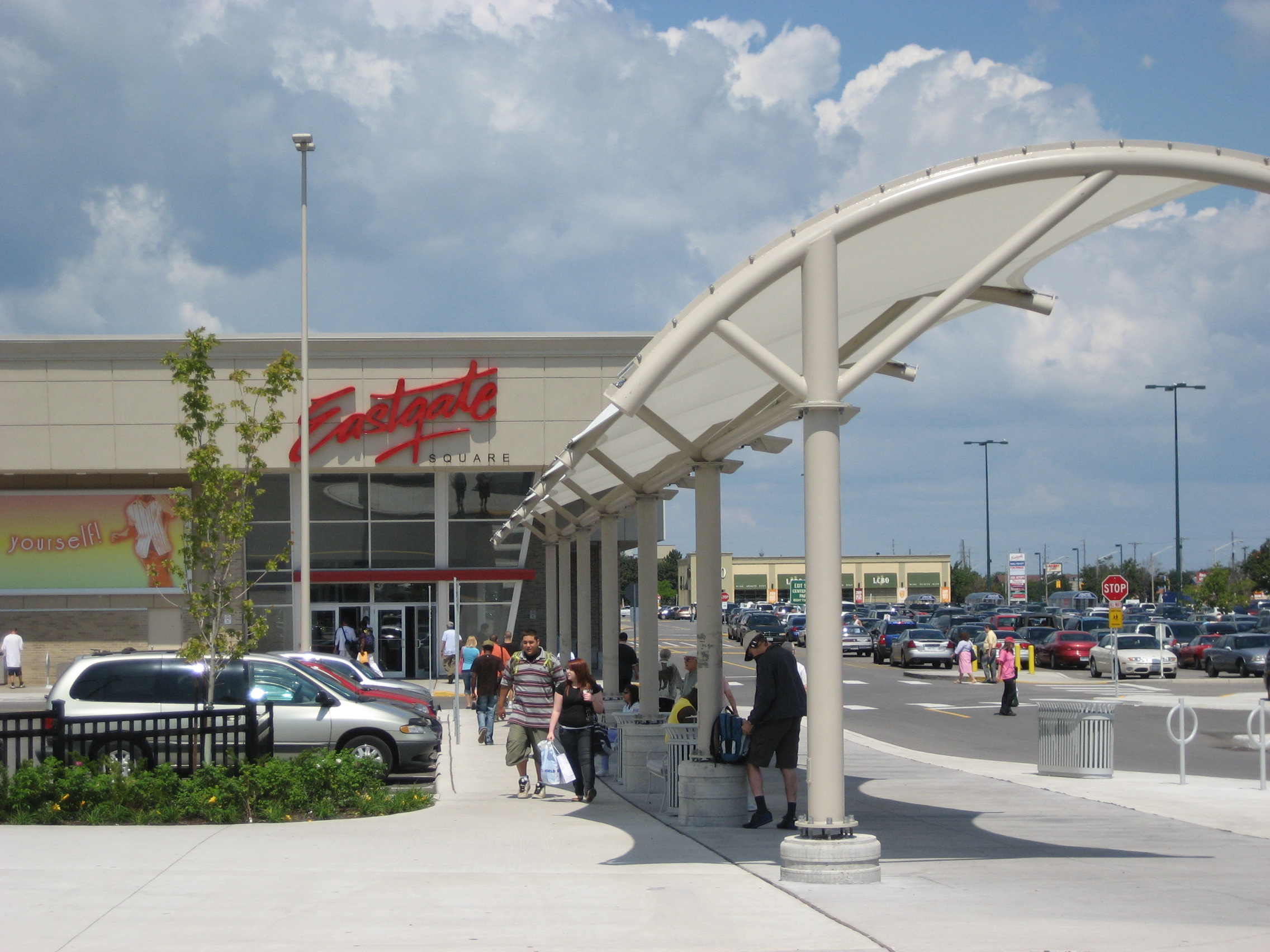
Covered walkway to the HSR Transit Terminal

The Hamilton Street Railway bus terminal is located near the southeast corner of the mall, on the north side of Queenston Road just west of Centennial Parkway. There is a covered walkway connecting the terminal with the mall. The terminal is notable in that it connects most of the community of Stoney Creek via route 55 with the rest of the HSR transit system. Originally located north of its current location and with its northernmost lane directly adjacent to the mall, it was redesigned and rebuilt in a new location slightly to the south, closer to Queenston Road, in the late 2000s.

- Coordinates: 43°13′43″N 79°45′57″W
- Hamilton Street Railway bus routes served: 1, 10, 44, 55/55A, 56 and 58
