= Metrolinx =

Public transportation agency in Ontario, Canada

Agency overview
- Formed: June 22, 2006; 20 years ago (as the Greater Toronto Transportation Authority)
- Type: Crown agency
- Jurisdiction: Government of Ontario
- Headquarters: Union Station 97 Front Street West Toronto, Ontario, Canada
- Minister responsible: Prabmeet Sarkaria, Minister of Transportation
- Agency executives: Nick Simone, chair; Michael Lindsay, president and CEO
- Child agencies: GO Transit; Union Pearson Express; Presto
- Key document: Metrolinx Act, 2006 (SO 2006, c. 16)
- Website: www.metrolinx.com

Metrolinx is a Crown agency of the Ontario government that manages and integrates public transportation in the Greater Toronto and Hamilton Area (GTHA) and surrounding municipalities. It was created as the Greater Toronto Transportation Authority on June 22, 2006, and adopted its present name as a brand name in 2007 and eventually as the legal name in 2009. It is headquartered at Union Station in Toronto, Ontario, Canada.

Metrolinx serves as the central procurement agency on behalf of Ontario municipalities for local transit vehicles, equipment and services. It is also responsible for operating the GO Transit system, the Presto card used across the GTHA and by OC Transpo in Ottawa and the Union Pearson Express airport rail link to Toronto Pearson International Airport.

Metrolinx is also responsible for the construction of transit expansion projects worth over $30 billion in Toronto – including the Line 5 light rail extension into Mississauga in Peel Region, the Ontario Line, the Line 1 subway extension into Richmond Hill in York Region, and the Line 2 subway extension – following a 2020 agreement with the City of Toronto.

== History ==
Former Metrolinx logo

The Greater Toronto Transportation Authority was created by legislation and introduced in the Legislative Assembly of Ontario on April 24, 2006. The bill was passed and received royal assent on June 22, 2006. In April 2007, a transition team seconded from the Ontario Public Service began work at the GTTA's headquarters at 20 Bay Street in Toronto.

On December 4, 2007, the GTTA adopted the name Metrolinx for public use. At the same time, it launched a new web site, and released the first of its series of green papers on transportation issues, part of the process of creating the Regional Transportation Plan. From June 2008, Metrolinx began using a new logo in printed and electronic communications.

== Timeline ==
- 2008:
  - December 17: Metrolinx announces that, together with twelve municipalities, it has made a collective bus purchase for 160 buses.
- 2009:
  - March 30: the Ontario government introduces legislation to merge GO Transit and Metrolinx into a single entity, with "Metrolinx" as its legal name. The legislation receives royal assent on May 14, 2009, taking immediate effect. This results in the replacement of the previous board structure with a new one comprising 15 private-sector members appointed by the province. The legislation makes other changes to Metrolinx's powers and abilities. GO's trackage used to be owned entirely by Canada's two major commercial railways: the large majority by the Canadian National Railway (CNR) and the remainder by Canadian Pacific Railway (CPR). Before Metrolinx's creation, GO Transit had only acquired partial ownership of the Lakeshore East, Barrie, Stouffville and Milton lines. However, since its inception, Metrolinx has expanded its ownership of the rail corridors on which GO Transit operates by acquiring nonessential rail lines from both CN and CP.
  - April 8: Metrolinx announces that it has acquired the Weston Subdivision, part of the Kitchener line, then known as the Georgetown line, for $160 million from CN.
  - June 27: GO Transit introduces summer weekend GO train service between Toronto and Niagara Falls.
  - December 15: Metrolinx announces that it has acquired the lower portion of the Newmarket subdivision for $68 million from CN, giving it full ownership of the Barrie line.
- 2010:
  - March 31: Metrolinx announces that it has acquired a key piece of track from CN for $168 million. This purchase is for a portion of the Oakville subdivision from Union station to 30th Street in Etobicoke just west of GO's Willowbrook Rail Maintenance Facility.
  - July 30: Metrolinx announces its plan to build, own and operate the air rail link between Union Station and Toronto Pearson International Airport.
- 2011:
  - January 24: Metrolinx and the Regional Municipality of York are awarded contracts for early construction on work on the York Viva Bus Rapid Transit way.
  - March 30: Metrolinx announces that it has acquired the portion of the Kingston line on which that GO trains operate from CN for $299 million, giving it full ownership of the Lakeshore East line.
  - June 16: Together with 12 municipalities, Metrolinx purchases 287 new transit buses.
  - August 24: Metrolinx division GO Transit announces that the Presto card is available across its entire GTHA network.
  - December 19: GO Transit expands its weekday GO train service to include stations in Kitchener-Waterloo and Guelph. Construction begins on the Union Pearson Express train line.
- 2012:
  - January 29: Metrolinx division GO Transit opens the new Allandale Waterfront GO Station in Barrie.
  - March 27: Metrolinx acquires key portions of multiple subdivisions from CN for $310.5 million. This purchase includes the southern portions of the Bala subdivision up to CN's main east–west freight line the York subdivision, part of the Richmond Hill line and a large portion of the Oakville subdivision from 30th Street in Etobicoke to a point just west of Fourth line in Oakville.
  - May 10: GO Transit announces summer weekend and GO train service between Toronto and Barrie.
  - November 15: GO Transit launches the GO Train Service Guarantee, a fare credit policy for train delays.
  - November 29: Metrolinx announces the Next Wave of Big Move projects.
- 2013:
  - January 5: GO Transit begins serving the new Acton GO Station.
  - March 22:, Metrolinx completes an additional purchase of the Oakville subdivision from CN for $52.5 million. This purchase is for the portion from Fourth Line in Oakville to a point just east of where CN's freight main line joins the Oakville Subdivision in Burlington.
  - April 13: Presto's smart farecard is available across the entire OC Transpo network in Ottawa.
  - May 27, 2013, Metrolinx announces its investment strategy, a series of recommendations for sustaining transit growth in the region.
  - June: Metrolinx has ownership of 68% of the corridors on which it operates, up from 6% in 1998. It has complete ownership of the Barrie, Stouffville and Lakeshore East lines and majority ownership of the Lakeshore West line (to a point just west of Burlington GO station) and Richmond Hill line (to Doncaster Junction, a point in between Old Cummer and Langstaff GO stations). Metrolinx owns comparatively small portions of the Kitchener and Milton lines, a situation that is unlikely to change as the lines are heavily used by freight traffic.
  - June 5: Metrolinx crews begin tunnelling the western underground portion of the Line 5 Eglinton light rail transit line.
  - June 28: GO Transit introduces its biggest expansion in 46 years with 30-minute service on the Lakeshore lines.
  - November 29: Metrolinx opens the Strachan Avenue underpass, allowing GO trains to operate below the road without disrupting road traffic. Metrolinx and the City of Mississauga announce the start of construction for the west segment of the Mississauga Transitway, scheduled for completion in 2016.
- 2014:
  - February 28: Metrolinx reveals plans to increase train service to Hamilton and build the new West Harbour GO Station.
  - March 31: Metrolinx division Presto announces that one million transit riders are using the electronic fare card across the GTHA and Ottawa.
  - July 17: Metrolinx has purchased stations at Georgetown, Brampton and Oshawa.
  - July 31: Construction is completed on the Union Pearson Express train line.
  - September 24: Metrolinx purchases the segment of the Kitchener line between Kitchener and Georgetown.
  - September 30: Metrolinx enters into a partnership with Ivanhoé Cambridge to redevelop a new GO Bus Terminal to serve as a major transit, commercial and community hub.
- 2015
  - February 2: 36 GO stations and terminals begin offering free WiFi, providing coverage to approximately 80 per cent of customers.
  - February 12: Metrolinx announces a major expansion of Stouffville GO Line, adding additional tracks and improving the corridor to increase train.
  - March 10: Metrolinx announces a major expansion of Barrie GO line, adding additional tracks and improving the corridor to increase train capacity.
  - April 24: The new York GO Concourse opens, a major part of the ongoing revitalization of Union Station, adding 50 percent more capacity than the Bay Concourse.
  - June 6: The new Union Pearson Express is launched, linking Toronto's Pearson International Airport with Union Station via a 25-minute two-stop express train.
  - July 9: The new West Harbour GO Station is opened in Hamilton in time for the Toronto 2015 Pan Am Games.
- 2018:
  - January: Metrolinx claims that their computer systems were hacked by North Korea but does not provide any further details.
  - March 14: The Whitby Rail Maintenance Facility is substantially completed.
- 2025:
  - November: Metrolinx hands over operations of Line 6 Finch West, which opens in December 2025 after construction began in 2016, to the TTC.
  - December: Metrolinx hands over operations of Line 5 Eglinton, which opens in February 2026 after construction began in 2011, to the TTC.

== Responsibilities ==
The Metrolinx Act, 2006, formerly known as the Greater Toronto Transportation Authority Act, 2006, describes two of Metrolinx's primary responsibilities as being:

- to provide leadership in the co-ordination, planning, financing and development of an integrated, multi-modal transportation network that conforms with transportation policies of growth plans prepared and approved under the Places to Grow Act, 2005 applicable in the regional transportation area and complies with other provincial transportation policies and plans applicable in the regional transportation area, and
- to act as the central procurement agency for the procurement of local transit system vehicles, equipment, technologies and facilities and related supplies and services on behalf of Ontario municipalities.

=== The Big Move regional transportation plan ===
The Big Move: Transforming Transportation in the Greater Toronto and Hamilton Area was one of Metrolinx's first deliverables. It is a Regional Transportation Plan (RTP) including a rolling five-year capital plan and Investment Strategy for the GTHA. The plan builds on 52 GO train, subway, light rail and bus rapid transit projects proposed by the Government of Ontario in its MoveOntario 2020 plan announced on June 15, 2007, and includes new projects to support them.

A draft version of the Big Move was provided to Metrolinx on September 26, 2008, and a final version was approved on November 27, 2008.

==== Progress ====
Planning and construction is underway for some projects supporting the Regional Transportation Plan.

The three levels of government have provided $16 billion toward the first wave of projects, which are already underway. The next wave of projects were still in the planning phase at the time of the Big Move's release, and still subject to funding. Some of these projects have since attained approved funding, while others have not.

=== Funding investment strategy ===
The Metrolinx Investment Strategy, released in May 2013, proposes a series of 24 recommendations as part of a four-part plan to integrate transportation, growth and land use planning in the GTHA, maximize the value of public infrastructure investment, optimize system and network efficiencies, and dedicate new revenue sources for transit and transportation. These recommendations included revenue tools and policy recommendations.

Metrolinx also advised that funds raised by all the new taxes would be put in a dedicated transportation trust fund, one that would be administered by a board separate from Metrolinx.

The Investment Strategy was given to the government for consideration in 2013.

=== Wayfinding standardization ===
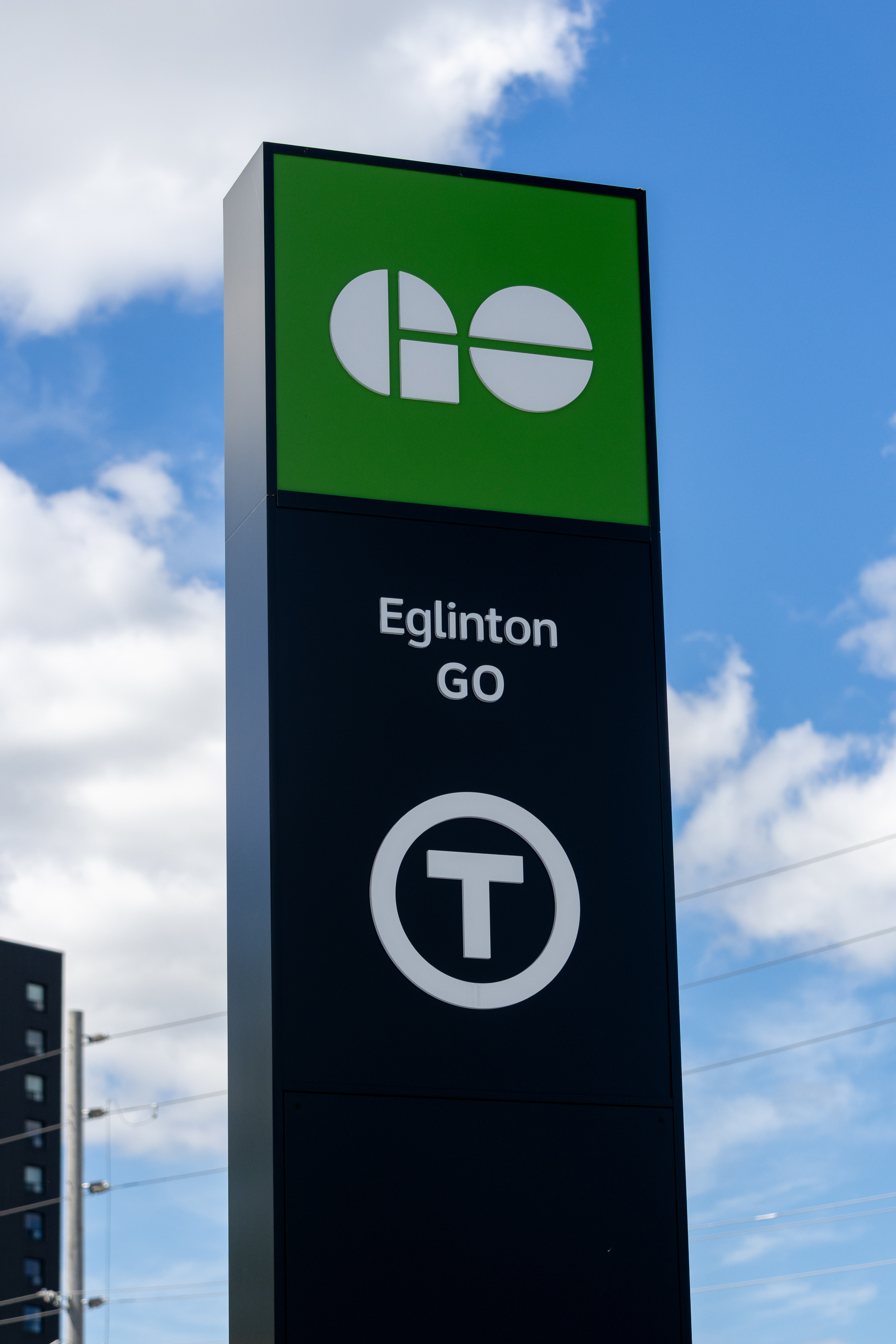
Signs using the Regional Transit Wayfinding System. The network identifier (letter "T" enclosed in a circle) is seen across various transit agencies.

Metrolinx has overseen the creation of a wayfinding design standard for transit in the Greater Toronto and Hamilton Area (GTHA) known as the Regional Transit Wayfinding System. The standard is intended to signify that all public transit modes in the region are part of a unified network while improving navigation and accessibility. Its design guidelines apply to signage at all new transit facilities in the region and updates to existing facilities (with some exceptions in the city of Toronto). Included in the standard is the network identifier, a common symbol to represent the network that is present at station entrances and outdoor signage.

The initiative involves all transit agencies in the GTHA: Brampton Transit, Burlington Transit, Durham Region Transit, GO Transit, Hamilton Street Railway, Milton Transit, MiWay, Oakville Transit, Toronto Transit Commission and York Region Transit.

=== Current projects ===
As of May 2024, Metrolinx is managing the following public transit projects:

Type	Transit service	Project	Start	End	Description
Commuter rail
GO Expansion: two-way frequent electrified GO train service along portions of certain corridors	Barrie line	Aurora GO Station	August 21, 2023		Second track to allow two-way train service to Aurora GO; Construction of second platform
GO Expansion: two-way frequent electrified GO train service along portions of certain corridors	Barrie line	Junction Triangle GO Station	February 2024	November 2027	SmartTrack station
GO Expansion: two-way frequent electrified GO train service along portions of certain corridors	Barrie line	Bradford GO Station			
GO Expansion: two-way frequent electrified GO train service along portions of certain corridors	Barrie line	King City GO Station			Surface parking expansion and renovations; New railway platform; Pedestrian bridge
GO Expansion: two-way frequent electrified GO train service along portions of certain corridors	Barrie line	Maple GO Station			Renovated and upgraded railway platforms; Pedestrian tunnels under platforms; Expanded bus loop with tunnel connection
GO Expansion: two-way frequent electrified GO train service along portions of certain corridors	Barrie line	Rutherford GO Station	August 1, 2019	July 11, 2022	Upgraded bus loop
GO Expansion: two-way frequent electrified GO train service along portions of certain corridors	Barrie line	Corridor Improvements			Davenport Diamond Grade Separation; Second set of tracks up to Aurora GO station; Electrification
GO Expansion: two-way frequent electrified GO train service along portions of certain corridors	Kitchener line	Bramalea GO Station	2020	May 15, 2023	New station building; New parking lot
GO Expansion: two-way frequent electrified GO train service along portions of certain corridors	Kitchener line	King–Liberty GO Station	January 2024	March 2028	SmartTrack station
GO Expansion: two-way frequent electrified GO train service along portions of certain corridors	Kitchener line	Weston GO Station	2019		New railway platform; New track through station limits
GO Expansion: two-way frequent electrified GO train service along portions of certain corridors	Kitchener line	Corridor Improvements			Railway tunnels under Ontario Highway 401 and Ontario Highway 409; Additional railway track; Electrification
GO Expansion: two-way frequent electrified GO train service along portions of certain corridors	Kitchener line	Kitchener Extension	May 2022		Second platform at Guelph Central GO Station; New storage and passing tracks
GO Expansion: two-way frequent electrified GO train service along portions of certain corridors	Kitchener line	Bloor GO Station			Underground pedestrian tunnel connecting Bloor GO/UP station with Dundas West
GO Expansion: two-way frequent electrified GO train service along portions of certain corridors	Lakeshore East line	Bowmanville Extension			Extension of Lakeshore East line from Oshawa GO Station to Bowmanville
GO Expansion: two-way frequent electrified GO train service along portions of certain corridors	Lakeshore East line	East Harbour Transit Hub	November 2022	August 2028	SmartTrack station
GO Expansion: two-way frequent electrified GO train service along portions of certain corridors	Lakeshore East line	Eglinton GO Station	September 24, 2022	Late 2024	Four new elevators to bring station into compliance with Accessibility for Ontarians with Disabilities Act, 2005
GO Expansion: two-way frequent electrified GO train service along portions of certain corridors	Lakeshore East line	Corridor Improvements			Grade separation; Maintenance and storage facilities (Whitby Rail Maintenance Facility, completed 2018); Train layover facilities - Don Valley and Midland layover; Additional track; Electrification
GO Expansion: two-way frequent electrified GO train service along portions of certain corridors	Lakeshore West line	Confederation GO Station	October 11, 2022	2025	New train station in Hamilton
GO Expansion: two-way frequent electrified GO train service along portions of certain corridors	Lakeshore West line	Long Branch GO Station	December 2023		New entrance building and new tunnels for platform access
GO Expansion: two-way frequent electrified GO train service along portions of certain corridors	Lakeshore West line	Mimico GO Station	2022		Accessible routes to all platforms
GO Expansion: two-way frequent electrified GO train service along portions of certain corridors	Lakeshore West line	Niagara Extension			Proposed GO station in Beamsville, Ontario
GO Expansion: two-way frequent electrified GO train service along portions of certain corridors	Lakeshore West line	Corridor Improvements			Burloak Drive Grade Separation; Drury Lane Pedestrian Bridge; Electrification
GO Expansion: two-way frequent electrified GO train service along portions of certain corridors	Milton line	Cooksville GO Station	November 2, 2017	September 3, 2020	New station building
GO Expansion: two-way frequent electrified GO train service along portions of certain corridors	Milton line	Kipling Bus Terminal	April 13, 2018	May 20, 2021	New bus terminal for GO Transit and MiWay
GO Expansion: two-way frequent electrified GO train service along portions of certain corridors	Richmond Hill line	Bloomington GO Station	Sprint 2017	June 28, 2021	New train station
GO Expansion: two-way frequent electrified GO train service along portions of certain corridors	Stouffville line	Agincourt GO Station	May 7, 2018	September 21, 2023	New station building; Second platform; Second track
GO Expansion: two-way frequent electrified GO train service along portions of certain corridors	Stouffville line	Finch–Kennedy GO Station	October 2023	August 2027	SmartTrack station
GO Expansion: two-way frequent electrified GO train service along portions of certain corridors	Stouffville line	Milliken GO Station	2019	September 2023	New second track
GO Expansion: two-way frequent electrified GO train service along portions of certain corridors	Stouffville line	Old Elm GO Station		October 27, 2023	Rebuilt train station; Bus loop
GO Expansion: two-way frequent electrified GO train service along portions of certain corridors	Stouffville line	Unionville GO Station		May 31, 2022	286 new parking spots; New island platform; Second track and turnaround track
GO Expansion: two-way frequent electrified GO train service along portions of certain corridors	Stouffville line	Corridor Improvements			Grade separation; Steeles Avenue East underpass; Second track between Kennedy GO and Unionville GO; Electrification
GO Expansion: two-way frequent electrified GO train service along portions of certain corridors	Union Pearson Express	Stockyards station	January 2024	December 2028	SmartTrack station
GO Expansion: two-way frequent electrified GO train service along portions of certain corridors	Union Station	Union Station Enhancement Project	January 27, 2022	Fall 2025	New passenger concourse to connect York, Bay and Via Rail concourses; New platforms; Two new tracks; Storm water management system
GO Expansion: two-way frequent electrified GO train service along portions of certain corridors	Union Station	Wilson Yard expansion			Don and Wilson Yards being combined into a single active rail yard
GO Expansion: two-way frequent electrified GO train service along portions of certain corridors	Union Station	Signalling system upgrade			
GO Expansion: two-way frequent electrified GO train service along portions of certain corridors	Union Station	Track enhancements			
Rapid transit
Bus rapid transit	Dundas Street bus rapid transit	Expected: GO Transit, TTC, MiWay, Oakville Transit, Burlington Transit, Hamilton Street Railway			48 km (30 mi) bus rapid transit (BRT) corridor between Kipling Bus Terminal and Ontario Highway 6 in Hamilton
Bus rapid transit	Durham–Scarborough bus rapid transit	Expected: TTC, Durham Region Transit and GO Transit			36 km (22 mi) BRT corridor through Oshawa, Whitby, Ajax, Pickering and Scarborough
Bus rapid transit	Queen Street – Highway 7 Bus Transit				
Light rail	Line 5 Eglinton		2011	December 2025	19 km (12 mi), 25-stop light rail along Eglinton Avenue between Mount Dennis station and Kennedy station
Light rail	Line 6 Finch West		2016	November 2025	10.3 km (6.4 mi), 18-stop light rail along Finch Avenue West from Finch West station to Humber College station
Light rail	Hamilton LRT				
Light rail	Hazel McCallion LRT		2020	Not announced	18 km (11 mi), 19-stop light rail along Hurontario Street between Brampton Gateway Terminal and Port Credit GO Station
Subway	Line 5 Eglinton westward extension		July 2021		9.2 km (5.7 mi) extension of Line 5 Eglinton from Mount Dennis station to Renforth station
Subway	Ontario Line		March 27, 2022	2031	15.6 km (9.7 mi), 15-stop subway between Exhibition GO Station and Science Centre station
Subway	Scarborough subway extension		November 30, 2022		7.2 km (4.5 mi), 3-stop extension of Line 2 from Kennedy to Sheppard Avenue
Subway	Yonge North subway extension				8 km (5.0 mi), 5-stop extension of Line 1 from Finch station to future High Tech station

== Operating divisions ==
=== GO Transit ===
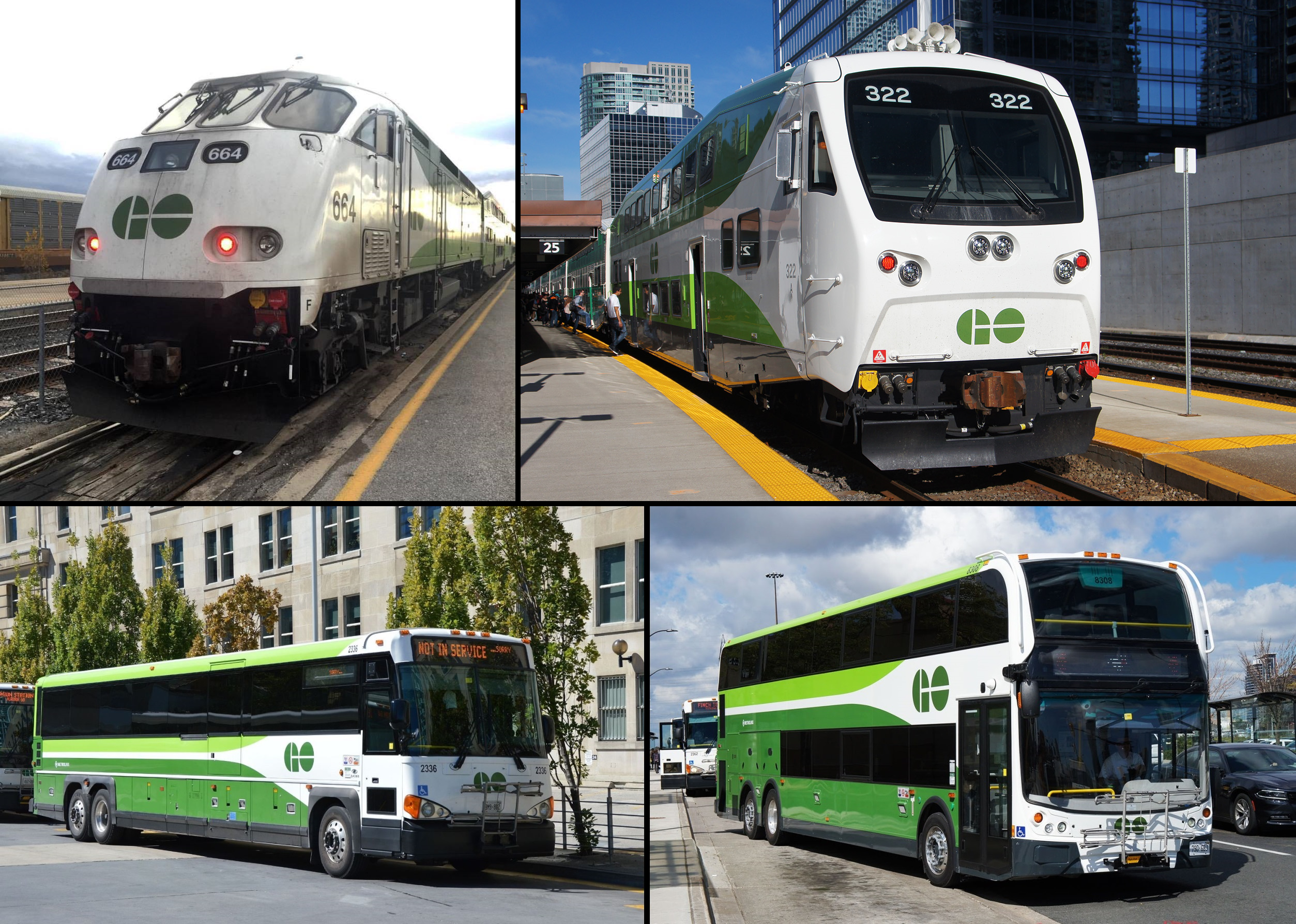
GO Transit offers train and bus service across the GTHA.

GO Transit is the inter-regional public transit system serving the Greater Toronto and Hamilton Area and the Greater Golden Horseshoe. GO carries over 65 million passengers a year using an extensive network of train and bus services; rail service is provided by diesel locomotives pulling trains of unpowered double-deck passenger cars, while most bus service is provided by inter-city coaches.

Canada's first such public system, GO Transit began regular passenger service on May 23, 1967, under the auspices of the Ontario Ministry of Transportation. Over time it has been constituted in a variety of public-sector configurations, but it became an operating division of Metrolinx in 2009.

New and improved GO service is a top transit priority listed in the regional transportation plan. Since 2009, GO Transit has introduced seasonal train service to Barrie and Niagara Falls, extended service to Kitchener and Lake Simcoe, opened four new stations at Acton, Guelph Central, Allandale Waterfront, and Hamilton West Harbour. Since June 2013, GO Trains along the Lakeshore rail lines run every 30 minutes, making the biggest expansion in GO Transit history.

=== Union Pearson Express ===
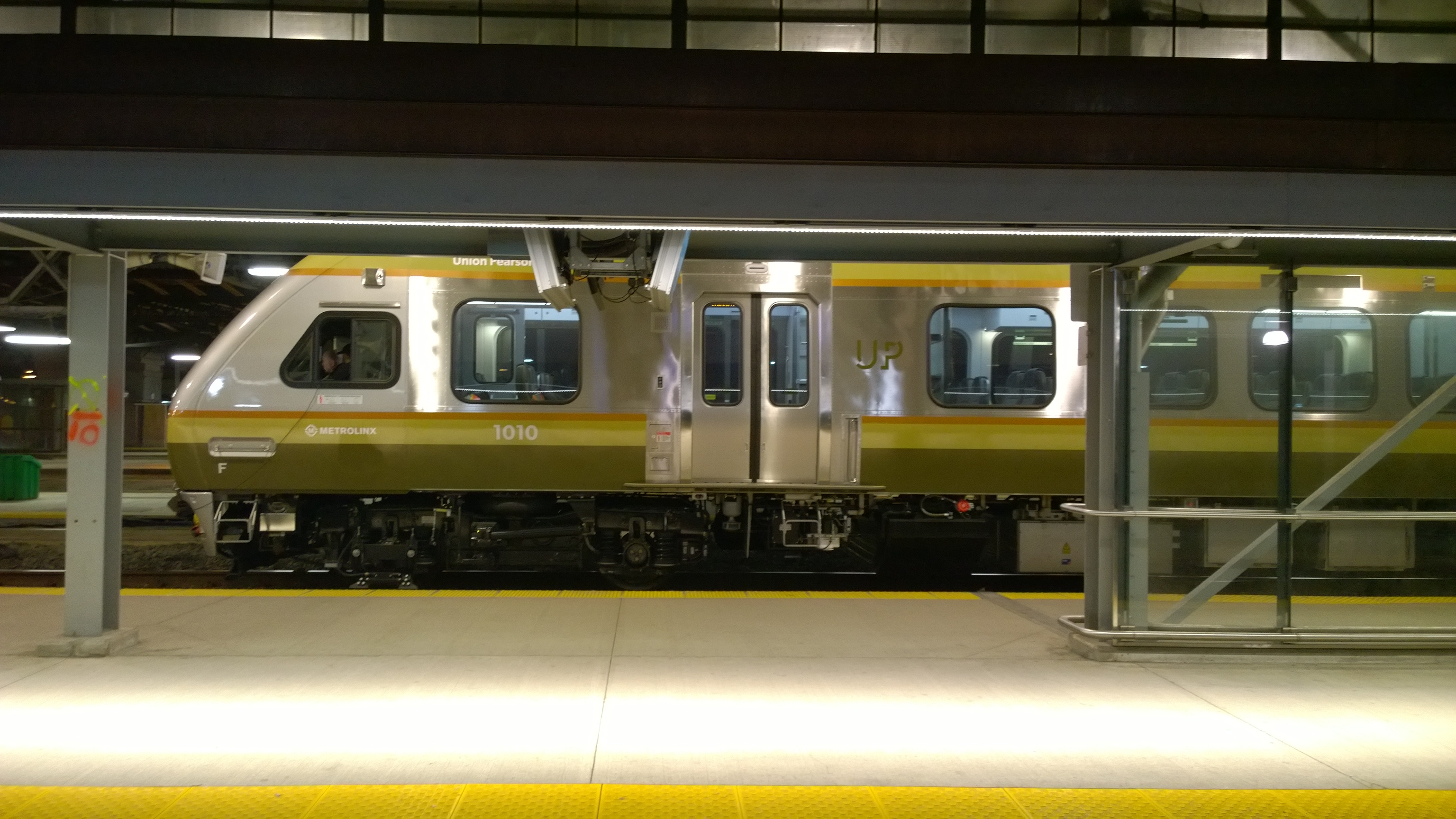
A Metrolinx Union Pearson Express train at Toronto Union Station

The Union Pearson Express (UP Express) airport rail link service began operation on June 6, 2015, linking Union Station in downtown Toronto with Pearson International Airport in the city of Mississauga, roughly 23.3 km (14.5 mi) away. The trains run every fifteen minutes, seven days a week, and are predicted to eliminate 1.5 million car trips annually. The duration of this trip is approximately 25 minutes.

The line uses a Metrolinx-owned railway rail corridor now used by GO Transit, as part of the Georgetown South Project to allow for additional train traffic. The UP Express shares the same path as trains on the Kitchener line, before splitting off onto a separate subdivision just west of the Etobicoke North Station. It stops at the existing Bloor and Weston GO Stations.

=== Presto ===
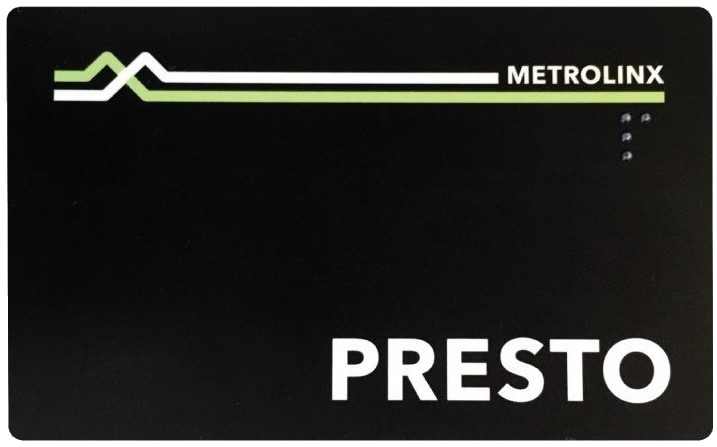
The Presto card allows seamless fare payment between different public transit agencies.

The Presto card, originally known as the GTA Farecard, is a smartcard-based fare payment system for public transit systems in Ontario, including those in the Greater Toronto and Hamilton Area and Ottawa. The Presto system is designed to support the use of one common farecard for fare payment on various public transit systems, through electronic readers that calculate the correct fare and deduct it from a preloaded balance.

Presto will also centralize its operational logistics, such as farecard procurement, reporting services, and a customer call centre. The system was trialled from June 25, 2007, to September 30, 2008. Full implementation began in November 2009. It will be rolled out across the province in stages. Presto now serves over a million customers in the GTHA and Ottawa.

By January 2017, Presto had been fully implemented on the following 11 transit systems:

- Brampton Transit
- Burlington Transit
- Durham Region Transit
- GO Transit
- Hamilton Street Railway
- MiWay
- Oakville Transit
- OC Transpo
- Toronto Transit Commission
- UP Express
- York Region Transit

=== Other programs ===
Smart Commute is a program that, with the support of local municipalities, endeavours to fight climate change by reducing traffic congestion and increasing transit efficiency. Employers and employees in the GTHA can explore and have assistance with different commuting options, such as carpooling, transit, cycling, walking, remote work, and flextime. The program is delivered through local transportation management associations.

Originally conducted under the Ontario Ministry of Transportation in 2006, the Transit Procurement Initiative involves Metrolinx assisting municipal transit operators with the procurement of vehicles, equipment, technologies, facilities and related supplies. The goal of the program is to reduce per unit cost, increase unit quality, and provide an open and transparent procurement process for municipal transit operators. To date, the program has supported 21 municipalities and transit agencies, has purchased over 400 buses, and has saved an estimated $5 million.

Metrolinx also seeks partnerships with individuals and the community, and offers financial support for proposed projects that support transit.

Smart Commute includes various programs for commuters, including carpool ride-matching, walking and cycling, and teleworking programs.

In July 2015, a $4.9 million plan was announced to double the size of Bike Share Toronto by 2016. The bicycles and docking stations will be owned by Metrolinx, while the system will continue to be operated by the Toronto Parking Authority.

In 2021, Metrolinx dropped its hydrail program.

== Governance ==
Metrolinx used to be governed by a board consisting of various appointees from the Ontario government and the regions within the GTHA. After the passage of the Greater Toronto and Hamilton Area Transit Implementation Act, 2009 merging Metrolinx and GO Transit, the Metrolinx board structure was changed, with politicians specifically prohibited from serving.

As of 2026, the Metrolinx president and CEO is Michael Lindsay.

Metrolinx's board of directors is composed of not more than 15 persons (including the CEO) appointed by the Ontario lieutenant governor on the recommendation of Ontario's Minister of Transportation. As of October 2025, the chair was Nick Simone.

List of Metrolinx presidents and CEOs
President and CEO	From	Until	Note
Robert MacIsaac	2006	2009	Chair
Robert Prichard	2009	September 2010	
Bruce McCuaig	September 2010	April 2017	
John Jensen	April 2017	September 2017	Interim CEO
Phil Verster	October 2017	December 2024	
Michael Lindsay	December 2024	July 1, 2025	Interim CEO
Michael Lindsay	July 1, 2025	(incumbent)	

Since 2020, several letters and emails obtained through freedom of information requests have raised concerns about the degree of close control which Ontario premier Doug Ford's Progressive Conservative government has exercised over the agency. According to the Toronto Star, the province is "increasingly treating the powerful organization as an arm of government while presenting its decisions as independent". An internal email from former Metrolinx CEO Phil Verster obtained in 2023 suggests that Metrolinx needed direct approval from the Ford government before publicly discussing issues surrounding Line 5 Eglinton, a project which negatively impacted public perception of the agency.

== Criticism ==
Metrolinx has been criticized for not having enough executive power in planning transit outside of municipal politics, despite being established to take political delay out of transportation planning. After Rob Ford was elected Mayor of Toronto in December 2010, he declared Transit City, the provincially funded transit expansion plan of light rail lines, dead. These lines were a large component of Metrolinx's 2008 Big Move. Metrolinx was again criticized when, in January 2012, its CEO declared that it would bend to what Toronto City Council wanted regarding how the Eglinton Crosstown LRT line should be built. The issue centred on whether the more suburban stretches of the line, from Laird Drive to Kennedy Station, should have been built at street level instead of a more costly underground alignment. Metrolinx was criticized after a Toronto Star investigation found that the agency has approved two transit stations, Kirby and Lawrence East, for the GO Regional Express Rail expansion due to political pressure from the Ministry of Transportation. Kirby is in the Vaughan riding of the then-transportation minister Steven Del Duca, and Lawrence East in Scarborough was part of Toronto mayor John Tory's SmartTrack plan, a signature campaign promise. Neither station was recommended to be built in the near term by an external consultant, AECOM, hired by Metrolinx. However, they were both shortlisted for construction starts. Ontario's auditor general found that Metrolinx incurred about $436 million "in sunk and additional" – unrecoverable – costs between 2009 and 2018 due to numerous changes to transit plans.

In Ottawa, where Metrolinx is only involved in fare collection, Jim Watson, the former mayor of Ottawa, has criticized Metrolinx for wanting to increase the fee it collects from 2% to 10%, and characterized it as a monopoly.

== See also ==
- Metrolinx mobility hubs
- Public transport in Canada
