= The Big Move =

2008 regional transportation plan for the Greater Toronto Area

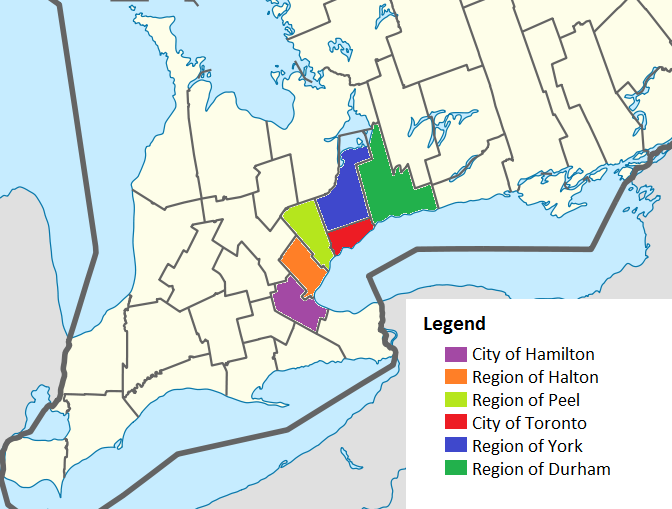
- The GTHA consists of (left to right; west to east): the City of Hamilton, Halton region, Peel region, City of Toronto and York region, Durham region.
- Created: 26 September 2008
- Ratified: 28 November 2008
- Author: Metrolinx
- Purpose: Regional transportation plan

The Big Move is a regional transportation plan (RTP) published in 2008 by Metrolinx for the Greater Toronto and Hamilton Area (GTHA) in Ontario, Canada. It made specific recommendations for transit projects, resulting from seven "green papers" and two "white papers" released for public discussion. A draft RTP was released alongside draft investment strategy in September 2008. After a series of stakeholder consultations and public meetings, the final RTP was approved and published by Metrolinx on 28 November 2008.

From its publication, it was Metrolinx's mandate to implement the RTP, which included new and improved GO Transit service, local rapid transit, stations, and fare payment systems.

== History ==
There was widespread consensus by community and business leaders in the GTHA that incremental change of the region's transportation system was insufficient, and that it needed a dramatic transformation to meet the needs of the 21st century. The regional transportation system needed to be effective, integrated, multi-modal, and funded in a sustainable way. In response to these concerns, the Government of Ontario created the Greater Toronto Transportation Authority in 2006, which became known as Metrolinx in December 2007. Metrolinx was given the mandate to develop and implement an integrated multi-modal transportation plan for the GTHA, and "The Big Move" plan was one of Metrolinx's first deliverables. It builds on the $11.5 billion MoveOntario 2020 commitment from the Government of Ontario announced on 15 June 2007, and includes new projects to support that initiative.

An initial stage of the RTP process was to release a series of "green papers", documents covering key issues for the RTP. These green papers were developed and consulted upon in late 2007 and early 2008, with the purpose of presenting information on transportation trends, challenges and opportunities for the GTHA:

- Paper 1: Towards Sustainable transportation
- Paper 2: Mobility Hubs
- Paper 3: Active Transportation
- Paper 4: Transportation Demand Management
- Paper 5: Moving Goods and Services
- Paper 6: Roads and Highways
- Paper 7: Transit

The next stage was the release of two white papers in May 2008. Paper 1 – Visions, Goals, and Objectives, presented the basis for the final RTP, with specific goals and objectives that could be used for its development and evaluation. A broader proposed vision for the entire system was also presented. Paper 2 – Preliminary Directions and Concepts, looked at various policies, programs and tools that could be used in the RTP. There were also various transportation system concepts that were modelled and evaluated based on resulting transit ridership, urban congestion, and the emission of greenhouse gas and other air pollutants.

A draft version of the Regional Transportation Plan was provided to Metrolinx on 26 September 2008. A final version was approved on 28 November 2008.

== Purpose ==
Forecast impact of the Big Move
	2008	2031	
	2008	Without RTP	With RTP
Population	6 million	8.6 million	
Automobile driving distance*	26 km	25 km	19 km
Rapid transit system length	500 km	525 km	1,725 km
Total transit trips annually	546,000,000	798,000,000	1,270,000,000
Daily trips during morning rush hour	467,000	682,000	1,100,000
% rush hour trips taken using transit	16.5%	16.4%	26.3%
% rush hour trips taken walking or cycling	9.0%	9.0%	12.5%
% population within 2 km of transit	42%	47%	81%
Commuting time*	82 min	109 min	77 min
Transportation greenhouse gas emissions*	2.4 t	2.2 t	1.7 t
Transportation energy consumption*	26.4 GJ	24.9 GJ	19.1 GJ
*Average per person

The GTHA is Canada's largest and fastest growing urban region, with a population forecast to grow by 2.6 million people by 2031. The region is becoming increasingly dependent and designed for automobiles, and traffic congestion is already costing commuters and the economy billions of dollars every year. Nine individual local transit agencies and one regional transit agency exist, and are poorly integrated when one out of four trips crosses a regional boundary, making transit unattractive. Investment in transit has been relatively stagnant, causing roads, highways and transit vehicles to be crowded and pushed to the limit. In the face of climate change, increasing energy costs, increasing urbanization, and an aging population, the RTP exists to alleviate these problems.

=== Impact ===
The Big Move conducted modelling to forecast what the impact of its implementation would be in the year 2031. The proposed regional rapid transit and highway network was expected to achieve significant benefits, even with the additional population. These benefits included reduced commuting times, increased active transportation and reduced environmental impacts.

== Priority actions ==
=== Expanding rapid transit ===
The region's transportation infrastructure has been characterized as neglected from under-investment. The core of the RTP is building a seamlessly integrated regional rapid transit network consisting of 62 different rapid transit projects. These projects form two long-term templates with 15 and 25-year horizons. These templates outline broad projects; specific details about technology, alignment, stations and service levels for each project are subsequently determined though a cost–benefit analysis, or an environmental assessment process.

=== Connectivity to Pearson Airport ===
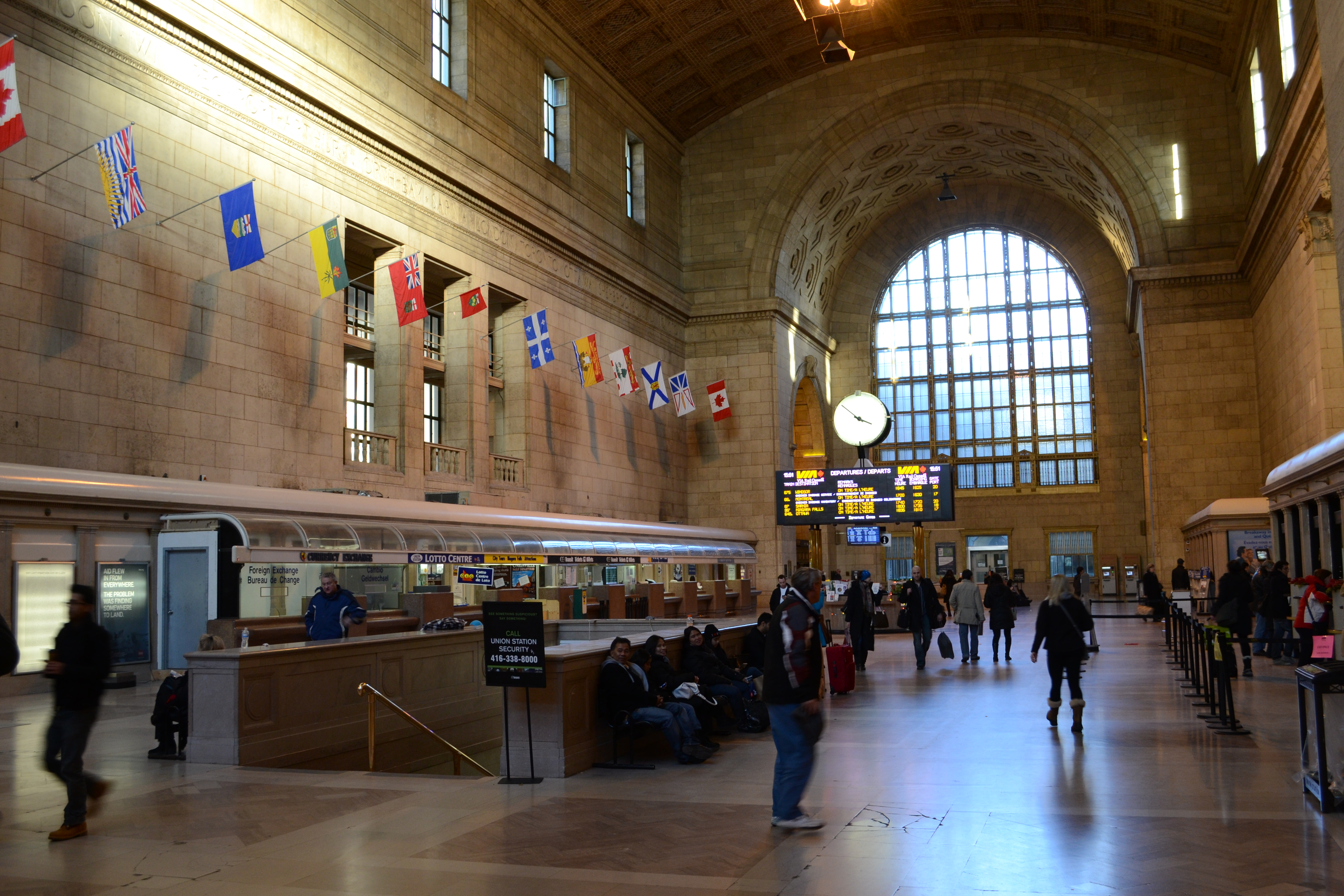
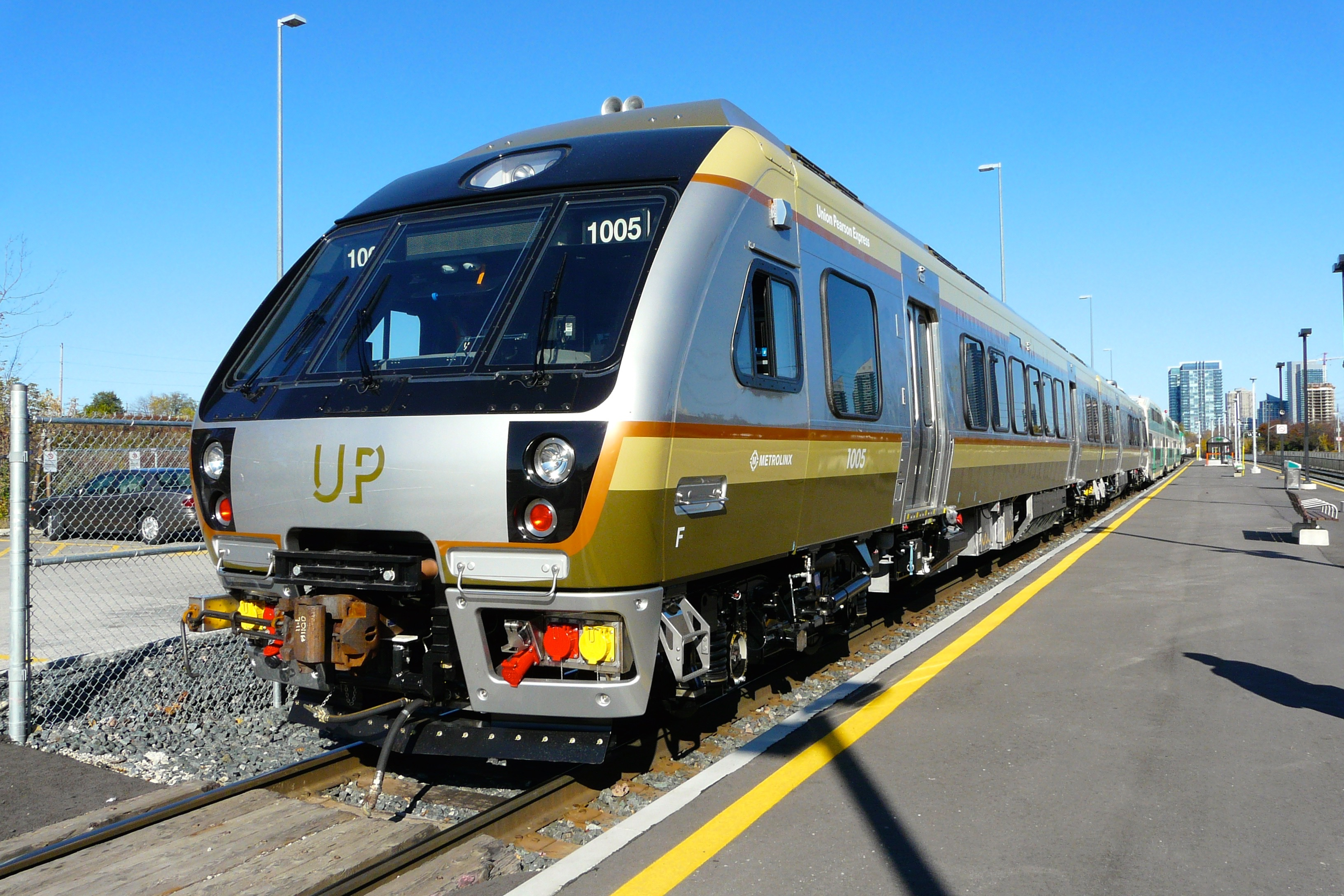
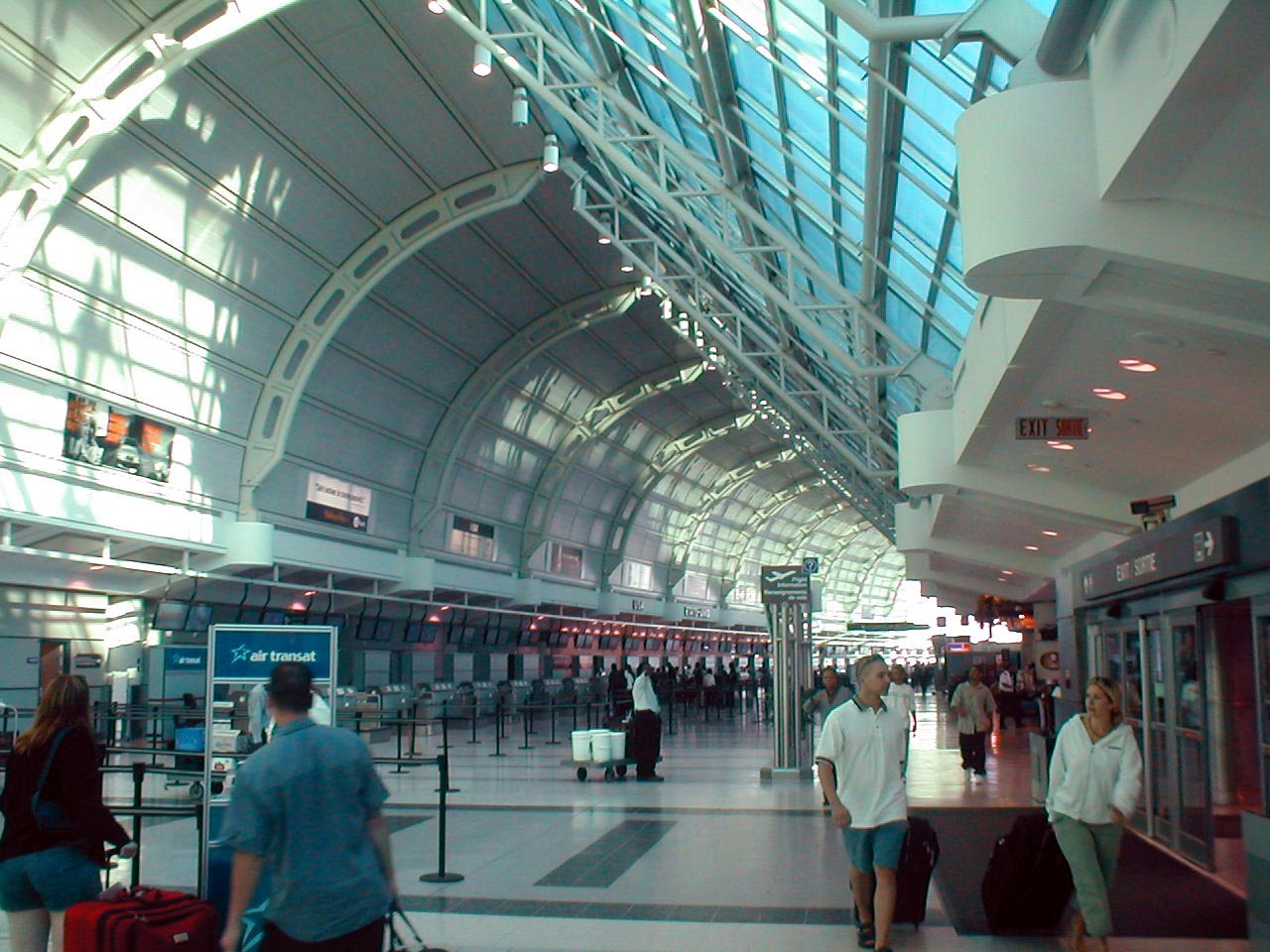
Toronto's Union Station and Pearson Airport, the two busiest transportation hubs in Canada, are linked together by the Union Pearson Express.

Having high-order transit connectivity to Toronto Pearson International Airport is the second priority action in the Big Move. The RTP identifies the following transit corridors, some of which are now in planning or construction:

- Eglington Crosstown LRT
- Finch West LRT
- Mississauga Transitway
- Brampton Queen Street / Highway 427
- Highway 427 from Kipling Station

With Pearson Airport and Union Station in downtown Toronto being seen as the two most important mobility hubs in the GTHA, the RTP specifically identified an airport rail link as being necessary between them. Discussions and studies regarding a transit link to the airport had been ongoing since the 1980s. Transport Canada began formal calls for proposals in 2001, and a contract was awarded in 2003. The public–private partnership was called off in 2010 after failed negotiations, and Metrolinx was handed responsibility for the project. The Union Pearson Express was completed and began operations on 6 June 2015, offering a 25-minute journey that departs every 15 minutes.

=== Expanding Union Station ===
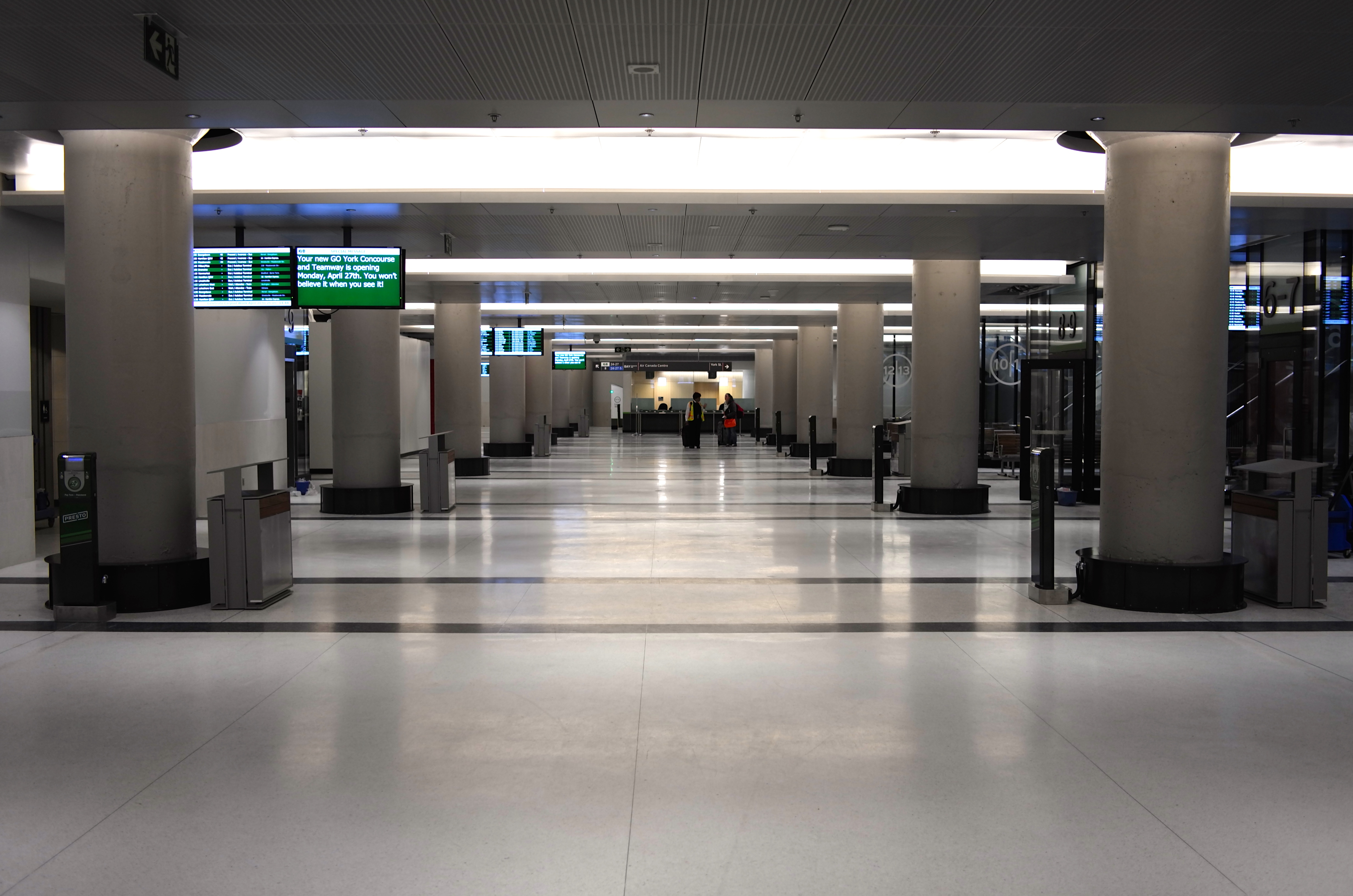
The York Concourse, completed in April 2015, became the main concourse for GO Transit operations as the older Bay Concourse was renovated.

Union Station is Canada's busiest passenger facility and "the heart of the GTHA's transportation system", handling 240,000 people daily, or 65 million annually. However, it was forecast in 2011 that passenger traffic was expected to quadruple in the following 25 years as a result of improvements that are called for in the Big Move plan, and Union Station would be at or over capacity without dramatic modifications. Furthermore, being a National Historic Site that was built and opened in 1927, the station had been showing its age: peeling paint, cracked and damaged floors, leaky roofs, and crowded and inefficient passenger concourse spaces that were designed in the 1970s.

The current work being undertaken includes excavation work to dramatically expand the existing GO and Via Rail concourses and create a floor dedicated to retail space, establishing new connections to the PATH network, increasing the number of entrances, implementing energy efficiency measures and restoring heritage elements. Future work could include a new train tunnel for the GO Transit Lakeshore lines, with a new station being built slightly east of Union.

=== Integrated transit fares ===
There are 10 public transit agencies in the GTHA with individual fare systems. This forced some commuters to have multiple fare payment types. The Ontario Ministry of Transportation began trials for Presto, a regional fare card, in 2007. Presto was later made an operating division of Metrolinx. Presto is available on GO Transit, the Union Pearson Express, and eight municipal transit agencies in the GTHA (Brampton, Burlington, Durham Region, Hamilton, Mississauga, Oakville, TTC and York Region). Fares are often cheaper than standard cash fare, and most municipal transit agencies will reduce their fare to between $0.50 and $0.75 for transferring to GO Transit.

There are 10 unique fare structures across the GTHA. Metrolinx is also working towards establishing one single fare policy across the region, with the objectives to create one fare structure that is simple and easy to understand, and reflective of the distance travelled and the quality of service. Metrolinx is evaluating fare structures that include a flat fare, or differentiations by mode distance or zones.

=== Mobility hubs ===
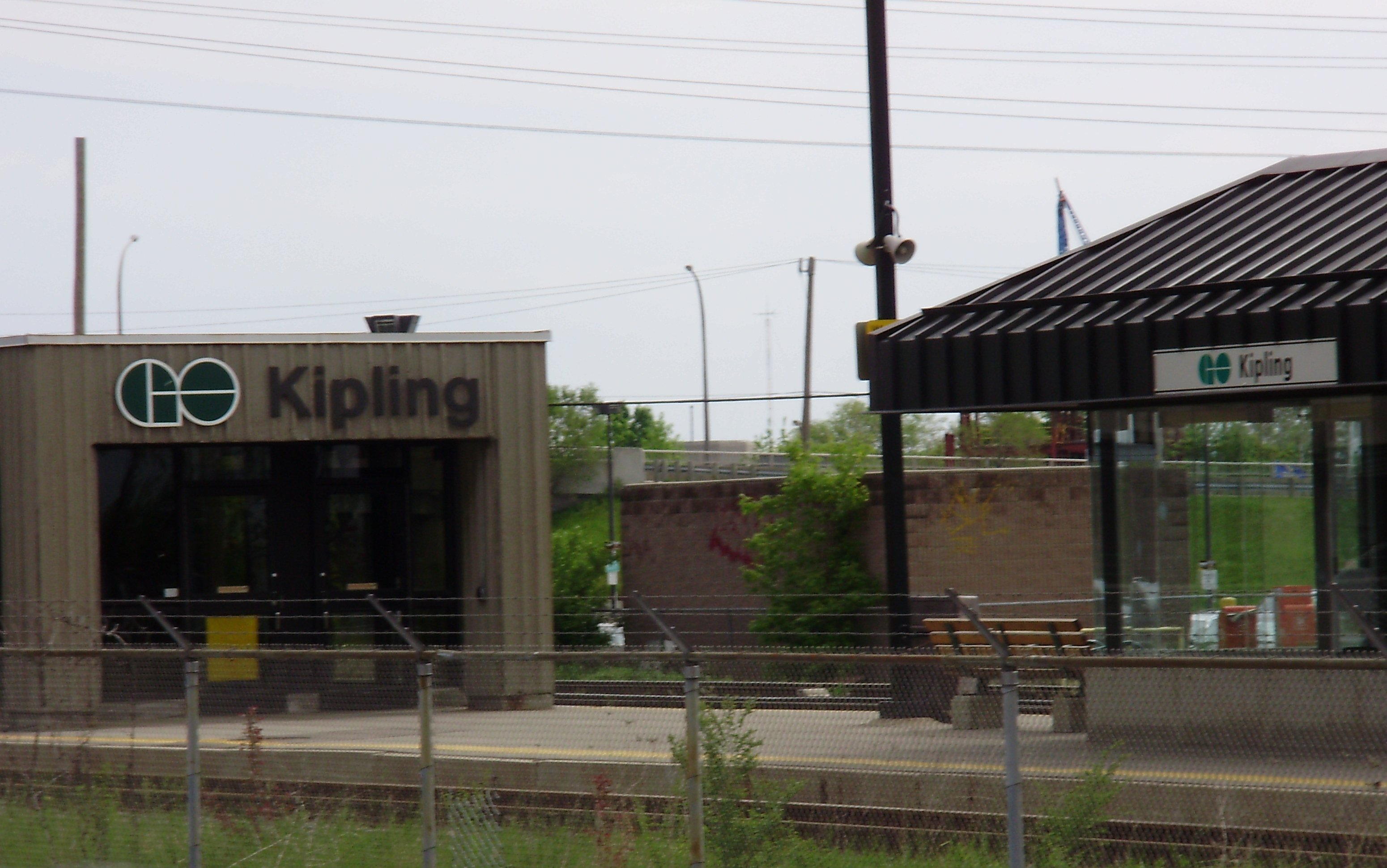
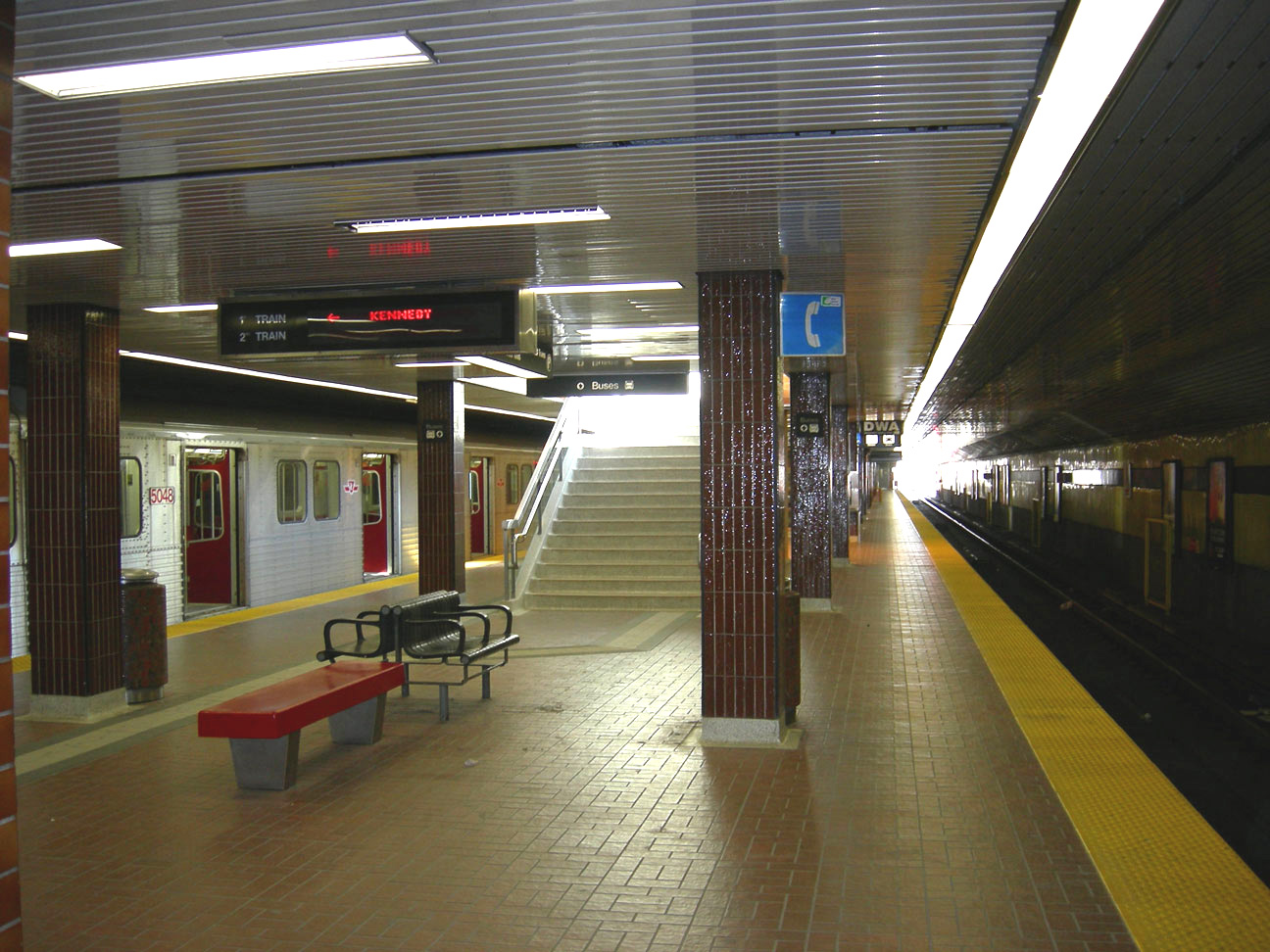
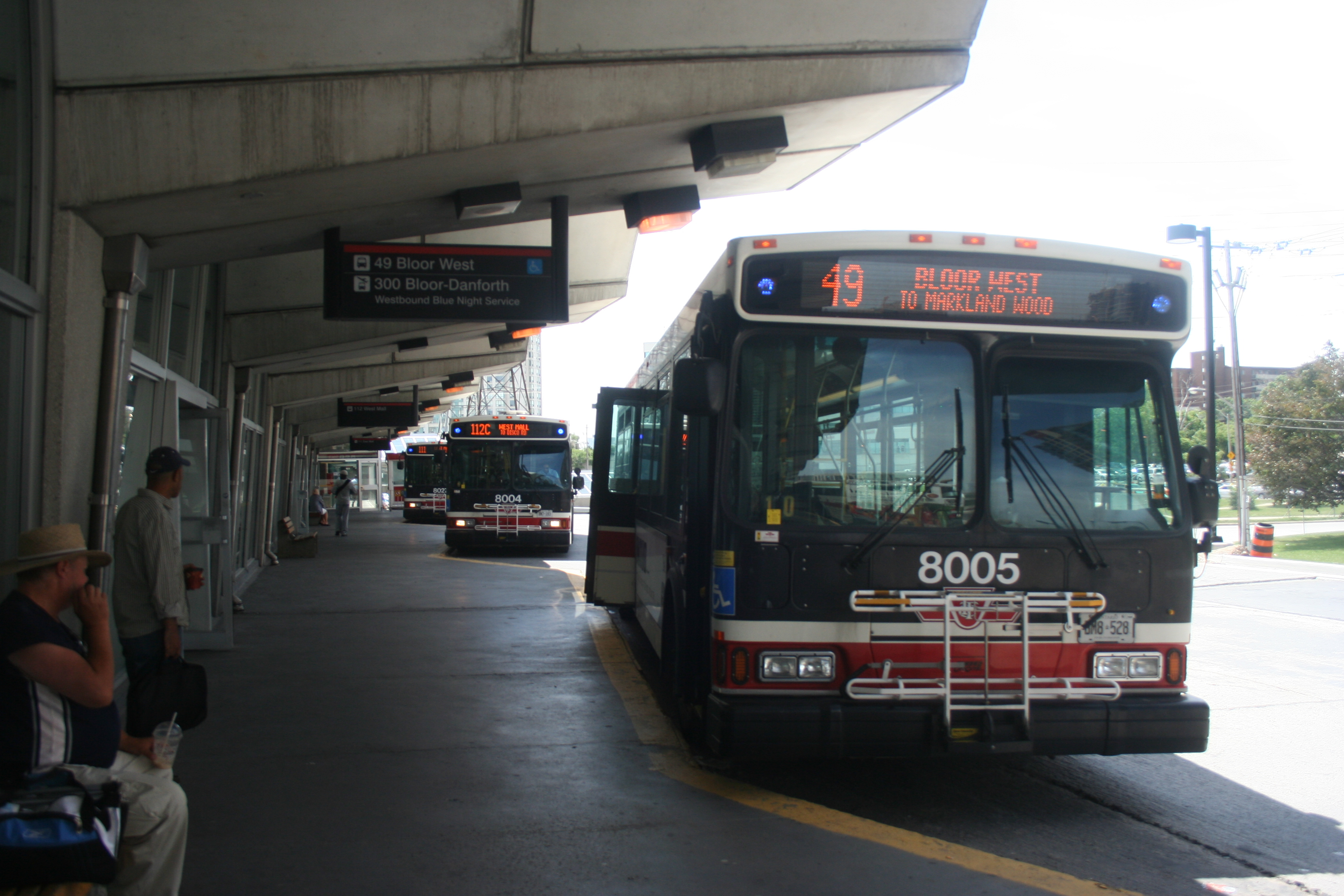
Kipling GO/TTC Station is an example of a mobility hub, where multiple transit modes and routes come together.

A transportation mobility hub is a major transit station and the immediate surrounding area, where different forms of transportation come together, serving as the origin, destination or transfer point for a significant amount of trips. The Big Move calls for "a system of connected mobility hubs” that allow seamless access to and transfers within the regional transit system. The mobility hubs also support higher density development.

Metrolinx has profiled 51 mobility hubs in the GTHA, collecting data within an 800-metre radius of each of them. In some hubs, Metrolinx undertakes detailed studies. For some hubs, these studies provide a broad plan for how the mobility hub should look and work over the long term, by informing more detailed planning, supporting future growth, and ensuring land use and transportation plans are well integrated. In other hubs, these studies address specific station issues in the short and medium term.

=== Investment strategy ===
The Big Move was to be accompanied by an investment strategy, to ensure that capital costs for the GTHA's regional transportation system were funded in a sustainable way. This would require the generation of $50 billion for all of the identified projects, which equated to $2 billion annually for 25 years. While the RTP outlined the preliminary requirements, an Investment Strategy would be crafted in more detail in separate cover. Metrolinx was given until June 2013 to draft such a strategy.

On 27 May 2013, Metrolinx released its Investment Strategy, which would use the following tools to generate $2 billion annually for RTP projects:

- A 1% increase in the Harmonized Sales Tax ($1.3 billion)
- A 5¢ increase in the gas tax ($330 million)
- An average charge of 25¢ on all off-street non-residential parking spaces ($350 million)
- A 15% dedication of all development charges ($100 million)

On 18 September 2013, the Government of Ontario under Premier Kathleen Wynne announced a panel to review the Investment Strategy, to "listen to different concerns and views and to assess them." The panel recommended two variant options of Metrolinx's Investment Strategy recommendations, which relied less on a Harmonized Sales Tax increase, and more on a gas tax increase. In March 2014, Wynne rejected the proposal to raise taxes to fund the RTP outright, in the lead-up to the 2014 Ontario general election.

A formal Investment Strategy has not been implemented to date, and the Ontario government has opted to raise funds for transportation project through its green bond program and the partial sale of Hydro One.
