= Grimsby GO Station =

Future commuter rail station in Ontario

Grimsby
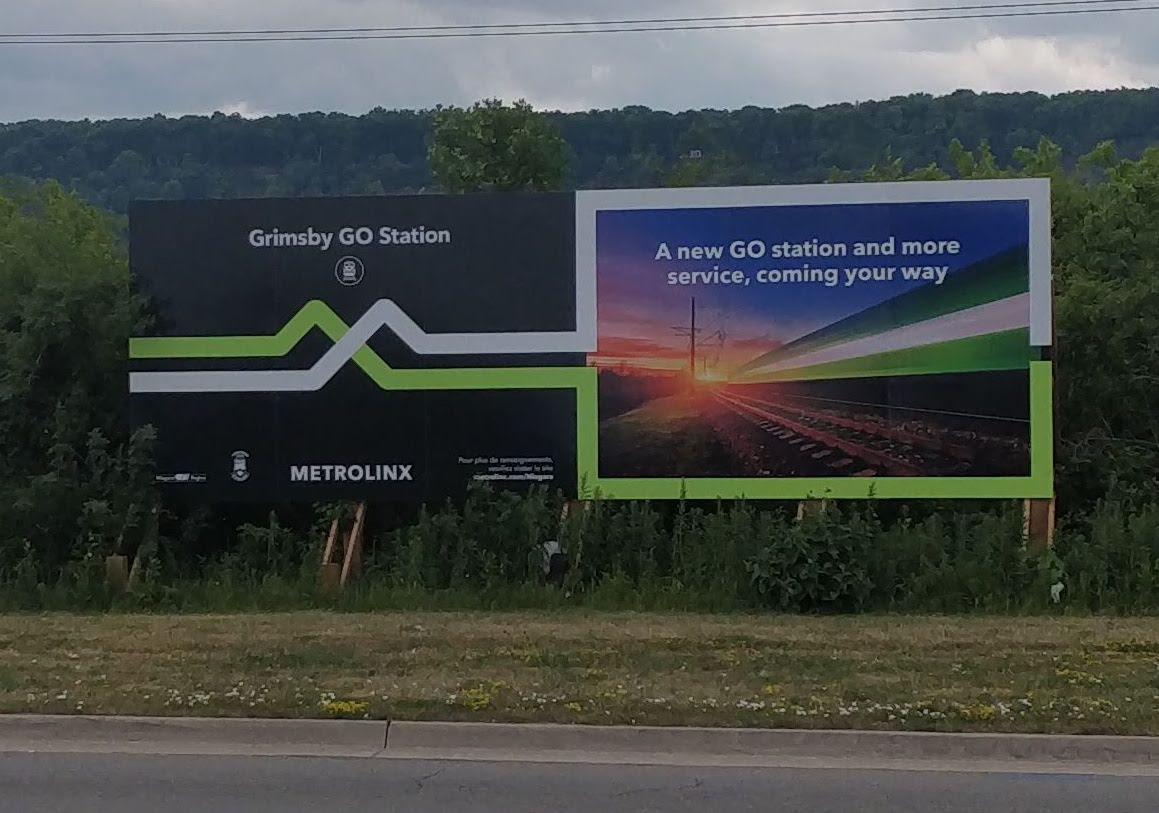

General information
- Location: Casablanca Boulevard, Grimsby, Ontario; Canada
- Coordinates: 43°12′15″N 79°35′48″W
- Owner: Metrolinx
- Platforms: 1
- Tracks: 2
- Bus stands: 5

Construction
- Parking: 220 spaces
- Accessible: Yes

Other information
- Status: Under construction
- Fare zone: 81

History
- Opening: 2027

Services
Preceding station	GO Transit	Following station
Confederation towards Union	Lakeshore West Opening 2027	St. Catharines towards Niagara Falls
Location

Grimsby GO Station is an under construction commuter rail station on the GO Transit train and bus network in Ontario, Canada. Located in the town of Grimsby in the Regional Municipality of Niagara, it will be a stop on the Lakeshore West line, east of Confederation GO Station in Hamilton. It was initially expected to open in 2021 and would have been the first station to open in the planned Niagara extension, which will also include stops at St. Catharines and Niagara Falls stations.

Three potential sites for the station along the Grimsby Subdivision Canadian National Railway track were considered. The three sites were at Bartlett Avenue in the east, at Victoria Avenue in the town centre adjacent to the Grimsby station used by Via Rail, and at Casablanca Boulevard in the west.

In November 2018, Metrolinx sent a letter to the government of the Regional Municipality of Niagara stating that it was halting the delivery process for this station and other stations in the Niagara extension, as the Government of Ontario was instead seeking private financing of their construction.

Ahead of the 2025 Ontario general election, all major political parties promised to build the GO station if elected. Construction on the station broke ground in July 2026 with completion planned for 2027. The station will initially be served by five trains per day. The station will be built using a new standardized design which the Ontario government claims will accelerate construction and reduce costs. In October 2026, the province announced that the major construction contract had been awarded to Kenaidan Murphy Joint Venture, with completion expected in the second half of 2027.

== Site research ==
As part of an environmental assessment for the broader rail expansion project to Niagara Region, three potential sites in Grimsby were evaluated for the cultural heritage impact of construction of a train station building and associated facilities such as parking and platforms. This included reviewing the book 1876 illustrated Historical Atlas of the Counties of Lincoln and Welland, Ontario, for features in Lincoln County and Welland County, historic counties in the province now part of Niagara Region; none of the three sites were found to have features of historic value requiring preservation by document review.

Field reviews were undertaken in January and March 2010 to identify and photograph cultural heritage resources within or near each potential station site. These identified six cultural heritage resources that may incur an impact from a railway station, all adjacent to the Victoria Avenue site.

The April 2011 Niagara Rail Service Expansion Environmental Study Report recommended the Casablanca Avenue site as the preferred option for a train station in Grimsby. Among the reasons cited were that adjacent lands are primarily commercial, there are no cultural or natural heritage features to protect, no watercourses are impacted, and GO Transit already operates a GO Bus service at the site.

=== Bartlett Avenue site ===
The Bartlett Avenue site (LA8) is part of Lots 1 and 2 of Concession 1 of the historic Lincoln County. The vacant site is on the east side of Bartlett Avenue and south of the Queen Elizabeth Way, at mile 25.67 of the Grimsby Subdivision. The site is within the provincial Greenbelt of the Golden Horseshoe, officially designated as "Tender Fruit and Grape Lands" provincially and a "Specialty Crop Area" municipally.

=== Victoria Avenue site ===
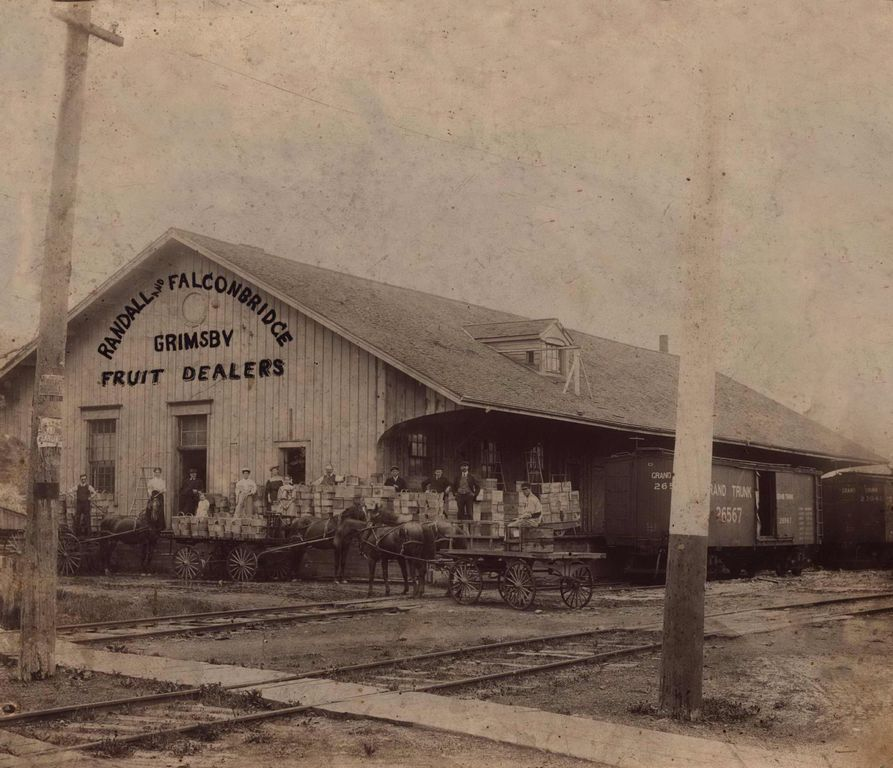
The original Great Western Railway station in Grimsby, built in 1853 and seen here when used by Randall and Falconbridge Fruit Dealers circa 1908. The station is protected by the Ontario Heritage Act.

The Victoria Avenue site (LA9) is adjacent to the site of the Grimsby railway station built in the 1990s, on the site of the second and third stations in Grimsby that were destroyed by fire. It is part of Lots 9 and 10 of Concession 1 in the historic Lincoln County. The site is on the south side of the Canadian National Railway tracks, extending west of Ontario Street and east of Maple Avenue. It is surrounded by developed areas consisting of residential structures from the late 19th century and early 20th century, as well as commercial and industrial buildings. Of the six cultural heritage resources identified adjacent to the site, the only one protected by the Ontario Heritage Act is the former Great Western Railway station built in 1853.

Land at this site is municipally designated for commercial development. The site is at mile 27.4 of the Grimsby Subdivision.

=== Casablanca Boulevard site ===
The Casablanca Boulevard site (LA10) is part of Lots 19 and 20 at Concession 1 Lincoln of the historic Lincoln County. The site required an additional field review for cultural heritage resources in September 2010 after the site under consideration was expanded. It is a vacant 5.4 hectare parcel of land that straddles the Canadian National Railway tracks west of Casablanca Boulevard, and is at mile 29.37 of the Grimsby Subdivision.

North of the railway tracks, the lands are designated for commercial development. The land to the south is within the Greenbelt, and is officially designated as "Tender Fruit and Grape Lands" provincially and a "Specialty Crop Area" municipally. The site may also have unidentified or unexplored archaeological resources.

The level crossing at Casablanca Boulevard may require grade separation in the future. In 2011, the site required a capital investment of $10 million for development, excluding track improvements and grade separation, and future expansion was projected to cost $12.6 million.

== Design ==
=== 2011 plan ===
The Niagara Rail Service Expansion Environmental Study Report specified the developed site would include a station building on the north side of the Canadian National Railway tracks, a parking lot with 470 spaces, a kiss and ride and taxi drop-off area, and bus bays. These were to be linked by a pedestrian tunnel to a platform on the south side of the tracks. The site was able to accommodate an additional 970 parking spaces on the south side of the tracks and a platform on the north side of the tracks for future development.

=== Standardized design ===
Grimsby is the first GO Transit station to be built using a standardized station design adopted by the Ontario government, which said the approach would lower construction costs and shorten delivery times. The province described the design as a repeatable model for future GO stations, intended to deliver value in both capital and operating costs. Early work in 2026 included the removal of trees and vegetation from the site. Following the award of the major construction contract in October 2026, work proceeded with site grading, to be followed by excavation and construction of the platform foundations.

The station is planned to have a single platform with a heated shelter and canopy, a five-bay bus loop serving GO buses and regional transit, 220 parking spaces, bicycle parking, and dedicated passenger pick-up and drop-off areas. The province estimated the station will shorten the trip to the nearest GO station by up to 30 minutes for local residents, and that it will allow for increased service on the Lakeshore West line.

== Services ==
There is currently no local transit service in Grimsby for connector services, though the Town of Grimsby Official Plan (2009) states the town intends to "explore opportunities for the provision of public transit". GO Transit operates a park and ride stop at Casablanca Boulevard on hourly service between Burlington GO Station and Niagara Falls.
