= Park Lawn GO Station =

Future railway station in Toronto, Ontario

Park Lawn

General information
- Location: 2150 Lake Shore Boulevard West, Toronto, Ontario
- Coordinates: 43°37′31″N 79°29′7″W
- Owner: Metrolinx
- Platforms: 2 side platforms
- Tracks: 2 + 2 central bypass tracks
- Connections: TTC buses: 66B; at Park Lawn Road

Construction
- Structure type: Elevated
- Parking: No
- Cycle facilities: Covered rack, indoor storage
- Accessible: Yes

Other information
- Status: Planned

Services
Preceding station	GO Transit	Following station
Mimico towards Confederation	Lakeshore West Planned expansion	Exhibition towards Union
Location

Park Lawn GO Station is a planned GO Transit train station in Toronto, Ontario, Canada. It will be situated in Etobicoke, above Park Lawn Road in the Humber Bay Shores area, serving the Mimico neighbourhood. The station will be integrated into the site of the former Mr. Christie's Bakery, which will be redeveloped into a transit-oriented, mixed-use master-planned community. The station's opening will be required upon the opening of the first phase of the redevelopment project, located at 2150 Lake Shore. A dedicated streetcar loop and the Waterfront West LRT are both planned to be constructed at the redevelopment project.

The station is included in Metrolinx's Lakeshore West line GO Expansion plan. The station is designed to Tier 1 of the Toronto Green Standard (TGS) and targeted for LEED Silver certification.

== History ==
In February 2018, Metrolinx released a report evaluating proposed infill stations as part of the GO Regional Express Rail (GO RER) project. The agency moved forward with plans to study the station, along with 12 other planned GO Transit train stations, in response to a request from Toronto City Council to consider a station there. Metrolinx had previously rejected the station in an initial business case (IBC) released in July 2016 due to its proximity (1.3 kilometres (0.81 mi)) to Mimico GO Station, high $189.4 million capital cost relative to gained net ridership, operational scheduling conflicts, and a lack of space to construct platforms long enough for 12-car trains. Following Metrolinx's 2016 rejection, Toronto City Council voted in November 2017 to request that the agency further consider the feasibility of the station. To address the operational scheduling conflicts raised in the 2016 IBC, Metrolinx planned to alternate Lakeshore West line trains between stopping at Mimico or Park Lawn and to allow longer trains to partially open while stopping at Park Lawn.

In June 2020, Metrolinx released an updated initial business case (UIBC), in which the agency approved the station, concluding that it was feasible and would bring numerous benefits, including serving between 4,800 and 5,900 daily riders by 2041. The proposed split-service model with Mimico GO Station was abandoned, with Metrolinx planning to have express trains skip the station. Additionally, the platforms were lengthened to support 12-car trains. To fund the station, the agency adopted a Transit Oriented Communities (TOC) framework, where First Capital and Pemberton Group, the real estate developers behind the redevelopment project, would directly pay for and construct the station, in exchange for increased density rights.

By October 2025, progress on the station had stalled due to the redevelopment project having been put on hold. As of August 2026, progress has not resumed.
