= Clarkson railway station =

Clarkson railway station may refer to:

- Clarkson railway station, Perth, Western Australia
- Clarkson GO Station, Mississauga, Ontario, Canada
