= Burlington GO Station =

Railway station in Burlington, Ontario, Canada

Burlington
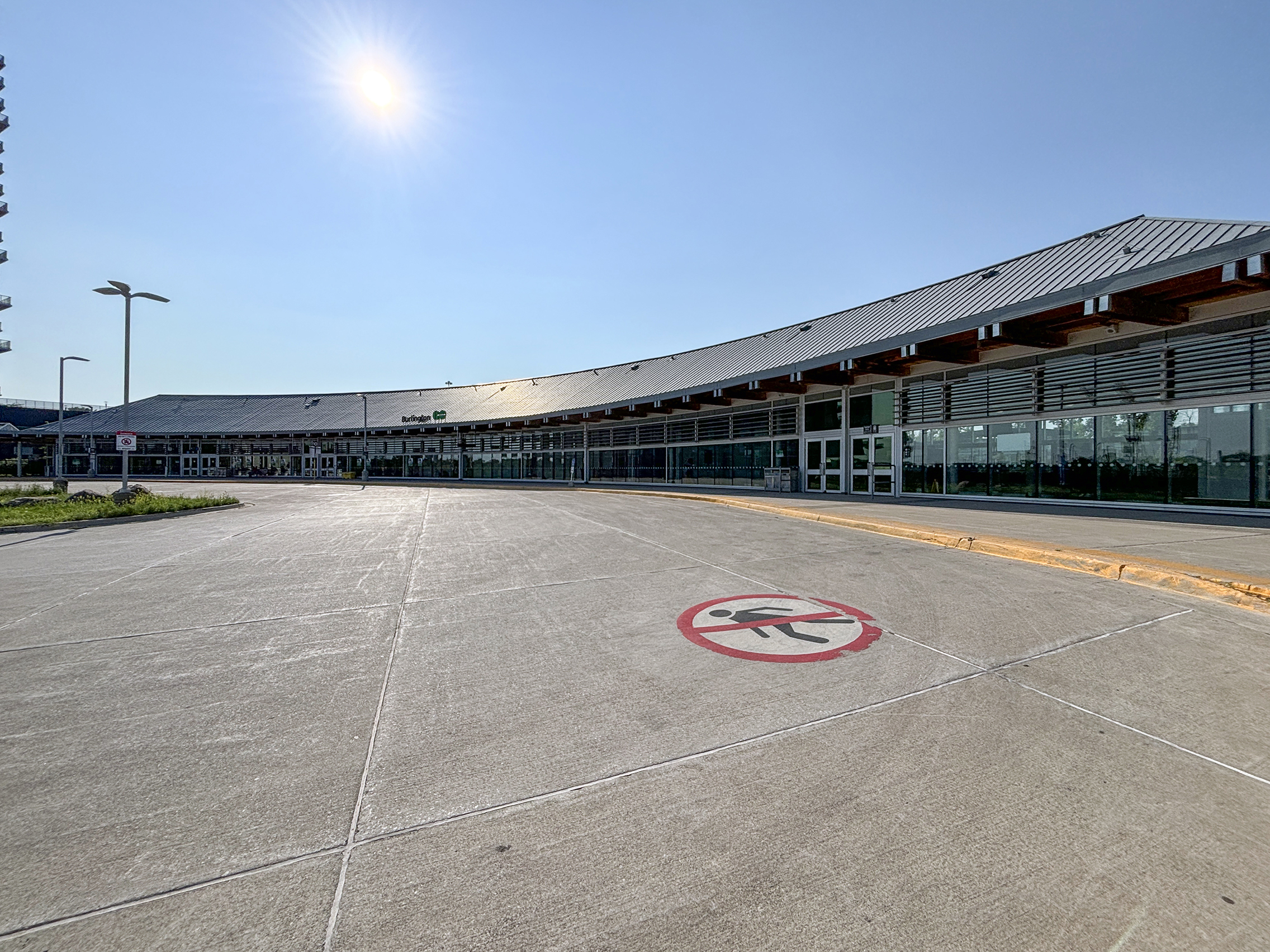
- Station exterior in 2024

General information
- Location: 2101 Fairview Street; Burlington, Ontario; Canada
- Coordinates: 43°20′27″N 79°48′34″W
- Owner: Metrolinx
- Platforms: 2 island platforms
- Tracks: 4
- Bus routes: GO Transit: 12 17B 18; Burlington Transit: 1, 2, 6, 10, 12, 50, 51, 52, 80, 81, 87, 101
- Bus operators: Burlington Transit; GO Transit

Construction
- Structure type: Station building
- Parking: 2,273 spaces
- Cycle facilities: Rack
- Accessible: Yes

Other information
- Station code: GO Transit: BU
- Fare zone: 16

History
- Opened: 1854 (GWR)
- Rebuilt: 1980 (relocation); 2012–2017 (new station building)
- Electrified: September 2035; 8 years' time (planned)

Services
Preceding station	GO Transit	Following station
Aldershot towards Confederation	Lakeshore West	Appleby towards Union
Aldershot towards Hamilton or Niagara Falls	Lakeshore West (peak express)	Appleby towards Union
Aldershot towards Niagara Falls	Lakeshore West (off-peak express)	Oakville towards Union
Former services
Preceding station	Via Rail	Following station
Hamilton toward New York	Maple Leaf 1989–1993	Oakville toward Toronto
Former services at Burlington West
Preceding station	Via Rail	Following station
Hamilton toward New York	Maple Leaf 1981–1989	Oakville toward Toronto
Preceding station	Amtrak	Following station
Dundas toward Chicago	International 1982–1990	Oakville toward Toronto
Preceding station	Canadian National Railway	Following station
Aldershot toward Suspension Bridge	Niagara Falls – Toronto; Local stops	Bronte toward Toronto
Aldershot toward Hamilton	Hamilton – Allandale	Tansley toward Allandale
Location

Burlington GO Station is a railway station and bus station in the city of Burlington, Ontario, serving GO Transit's Lakeshore West line. It has been the main terminal for Burlington Transit since 2025 and houses its customer service desk. The station is located at 2101 Fairview Street near Brant Street.

== Overview ==
Burlington station interior in 2024

It is a stop on the Lakeshore West line GO train service, and was, for a time, the western terminus of the rail services. Most peak-hour and off-peak trains now terminate service at Aldershot or West Harbour, and a few trains link Hamilton GO further to the west.

There are extensive parking facilities on both the north and south sides of the station. A large multi-level parking structure opened in 2008, significantly expanding the parking capacity of the station. Burlington Transit serves the bus terminal at the south side of the station, connected by wheelchair accessible tunnels under the tracks.

== History ==
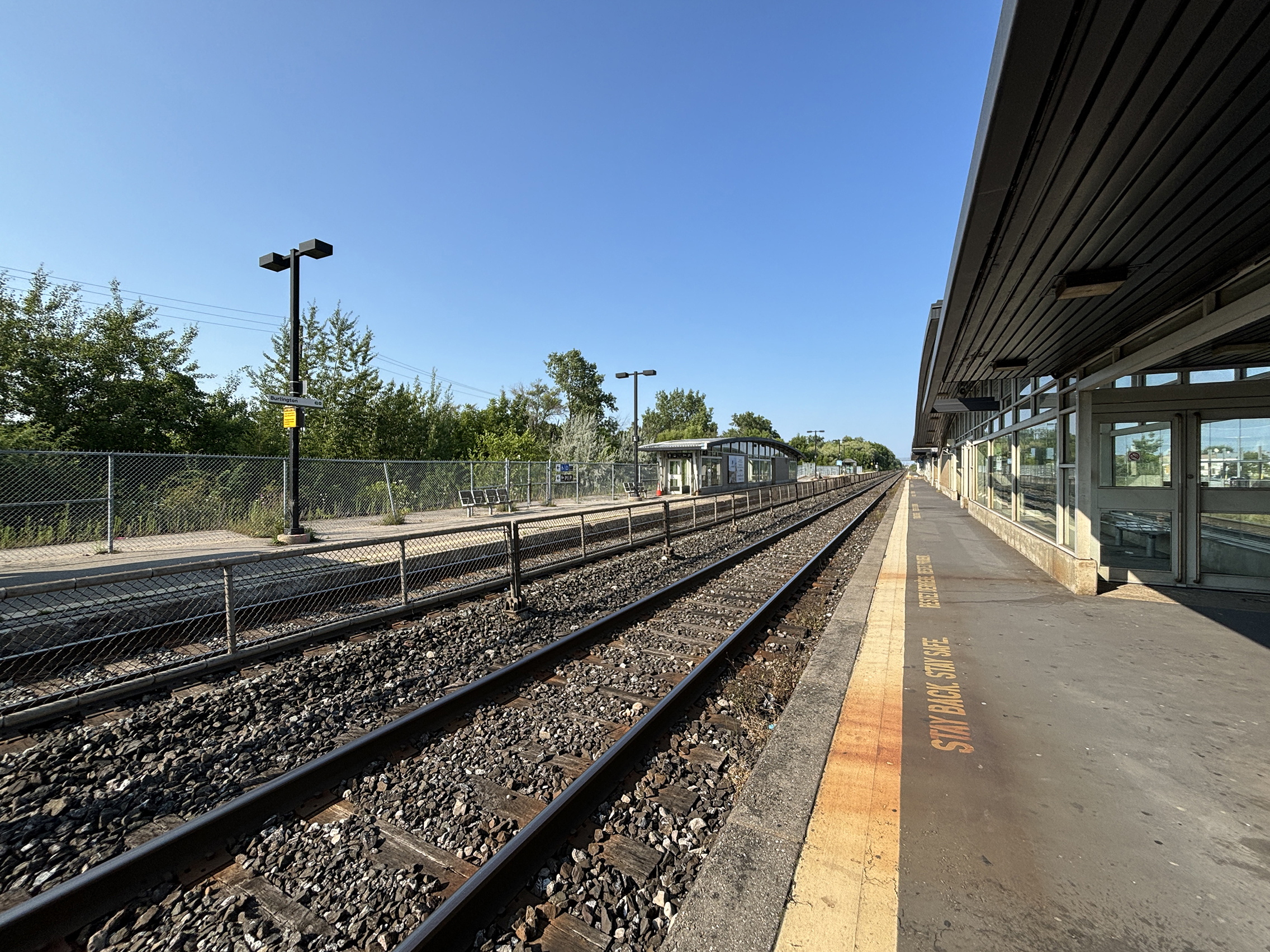
Burlington platform in 2024

The original Great Western Railway station was built in 1855, just west of Brant Street, about half a mile west of the current GO Station. With the building of the Hamilton & Northwestern Railway in 1877, this location became a connection known as Burlington Junction.

The Grand Trunk Railway purchased the Great Western Railway in 1882 and the Hamilton & Northwestern Railway/Northern Railway in 1888, and in turn was absorbed into the Canadian National Railway in 1923

That first station building burnt down in 1904 and was rebuilt in 1906.

GO Transit rush hour service was launched in 1967 and a new station location opened in 1980 at Fairview Street, with the old station renamed Burlington West. In 1977, Via Rail acquired Burlington West station from Canadian National but it ceased operation in 1988, when Via Rail moved its passenger office to the GO station. Subsequently, the Burlington West Station building was moved from its original site to be preserved as a museum named Freeman Station..

All-day GO Transit service commenced in 1992.

Construction of a new 20,300 square feet (1,890 m^{2}) station building began in September 2012, and was completed in Fall 2017.

== Bus service ==
Burlington Transit routes:

- 1 Plains (board at Fairview Street-outside of station)
- 2 Brant
- 6 Headon
- 10 New–Maple
- 12 Upper Middle
- 50 Burlington South (Late Night Service only)
- 51 Burlington Northeast (Late Night Service only)
- 52 Burlington Northwest (Late Night Service only)
- 80 Harvester
- 81 North Service (peak service only)
- 87 North Service–Aldershot (peak service only)
- 101 Plains Express (peak service only)

GO Transit bus routes:

- 12 Niagara Falls
- 17B Waterloo/Hamilton
- 18 Lakeshore West

== Future ==
According to Metrolinx documentation, the station is planned to be the western end of the future electrified portion of the Lakeshore West line.

== Freeman Station ==
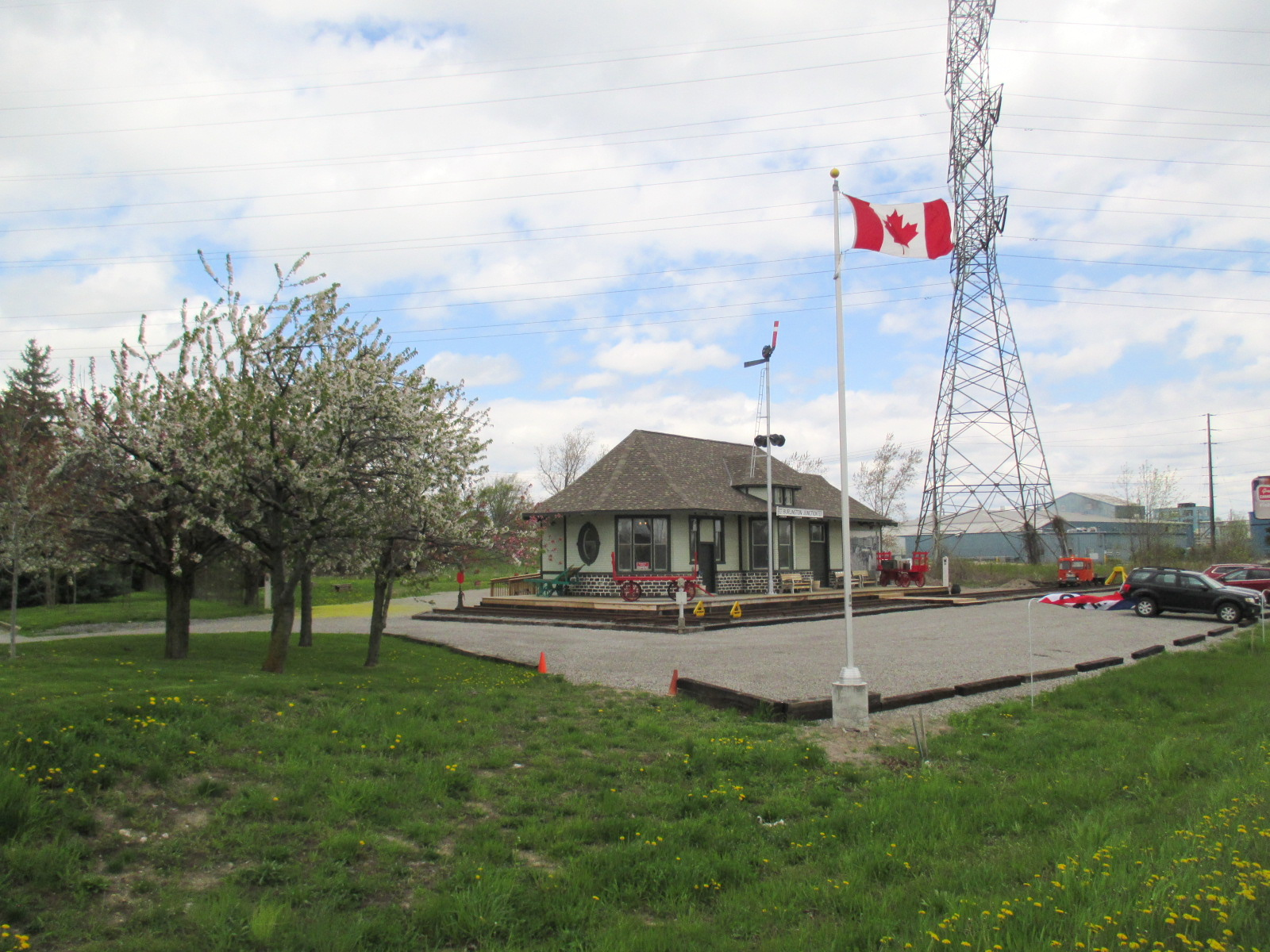
Freeman Station as a museum (2019)

Freeman Station is a preserved railway station built in 1906 and a museum. It was the second railway station built in Burlington. The first Burlington station was built in 1854 at what was then Freeman Village, which inspired the name for the museum station. The 1906 station ceased operation as a railway facility in 1988. In 2005, Canadian National Railway wanted the station site for track expansion; thus, it donated the station building to the city of Burlington. After a temporary move, the building was relocated to its current site in 2013, which was 1.3 kilometres (0.81 mi) from its original site. A volunteer group called Friends of Freeman Station started its restoration in 2013, and opened it for visitors in July 2017. It temporarily closed in May 2023, as the city of Burlington required some upgrades to the station in order to issue an occupancy permit. In May 2025, the city decided to take over maintenance of the station museum, when Friends of Freeman Station said they could no longer operate it. The city made the station part of Museums of Burlington, which also operates Ireland House and Joseph Brant Museum.

The station was a combination passenger and baggage depot. Characteristic of Grand Trunk Railway stations, it has a high truncated-hipped roof which flares out over very deep sheltering eaves, timber rafter-tail brackets decorating the outer part of these eaves, a tall centre chimney with decorative brick detail, a dormer window on the tracks side with a five-sided flared roof, five-panel doors with high transoms and the many large one-over-one double-hung windows. The station has a granite base and upper frame walls; the roof is supported by a hammer-beam truss system.

Besides the building, the museum also features a model train diorama, artifacts, a caboose, and a boxcar.
