= Clarkson GO Station =

Railway station in Mississauga, Ontario, Canada

Clarkson
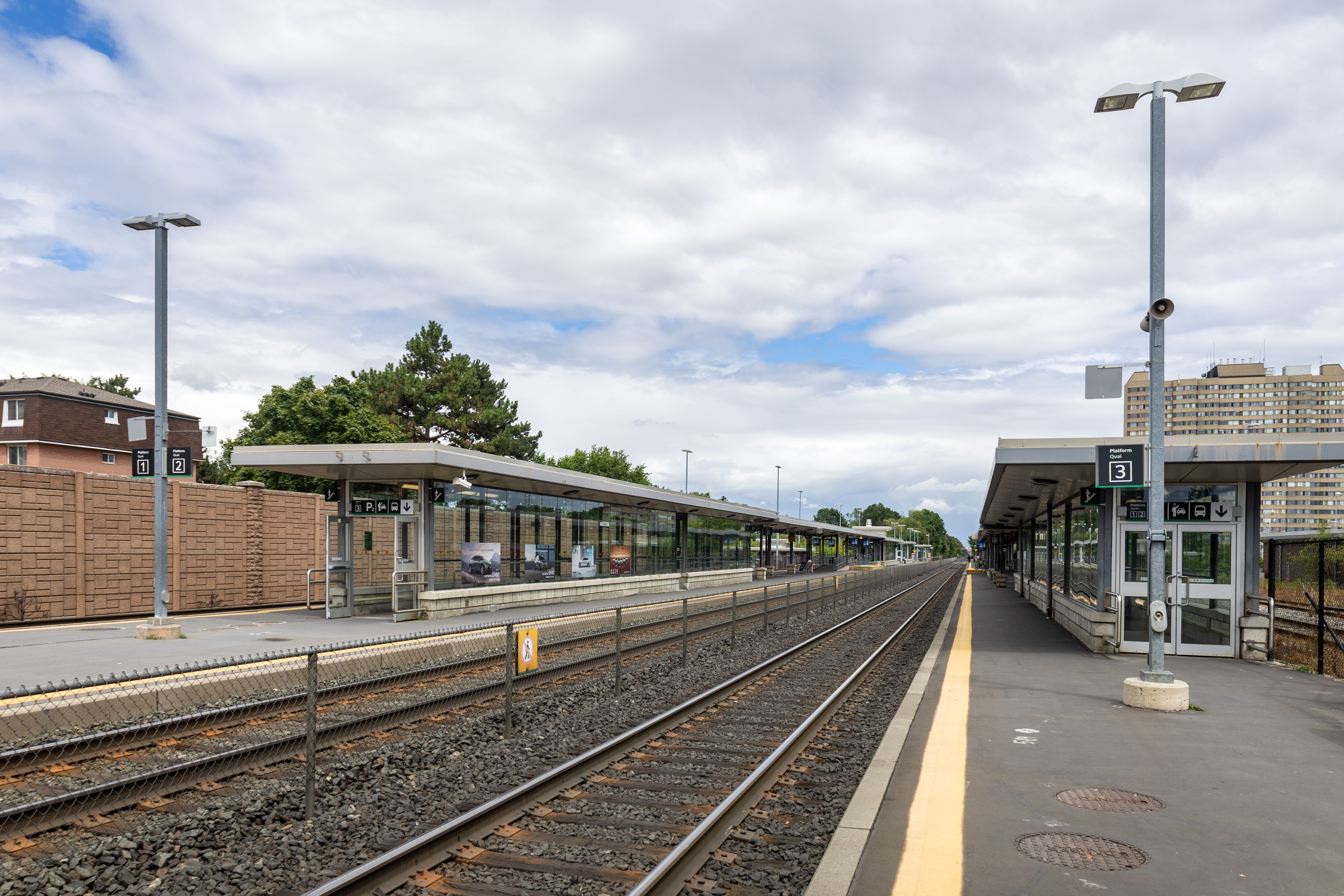

General information
- Location: 1110 Southdown Road; Mississauga, Ontario; Canada
- Coordinates: 43°30′44″N 79°38′05″W
- Owner: Metrolinx
- Platforms: 1 side platform, 1 island platform
- Tracks: 3
- Bus routes: 18
- Connections: MiWay; Oakville Transit

Construction
- Structure type: Station building
- Parking: 2,539 spaces
- Cycle facilities: Yes
- Accessible: Yes

Other information
- Station code: GO Transit: CL
- Fare zone: 12

History
- Electrified: September 2035; 8 years' time (planned)

Services
Preceding station	GO Transit	Following station
Oakville towards Confederation	Lakeshore West	Port Credit towards Union
Oakville towards Hamilton or Niagara Falls	Lakeshore West (peak express)	Union Terminus
Former services
Preceding station	Canadian National Railway	Following station
Oakville toward Suspension Bridge	Niagara Falls – Toronto; Local stops	Lorne Park toward Toronto
Location

Clarkson GO Station is a GO Transit railway and bus station in Mississauga, Ontario, Canada. It is a stop on the Lakeshore West line, serving the Clarkson neighbourhood. It is also serviced by MiWay and Oakville Transit buses.

== History ==
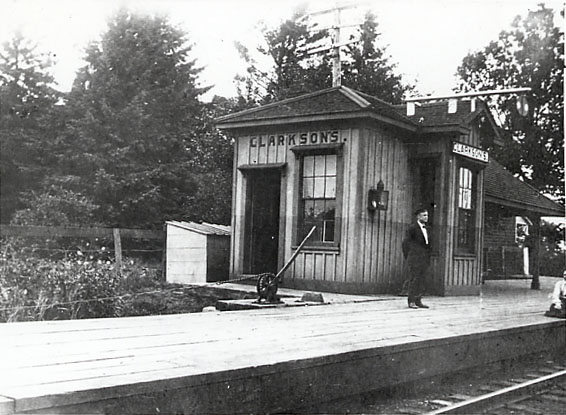

The original railway station was located about 800 meters to the east of the present day station, on the north side of the railway tracks, behind Warren Clarkson's store and Post Office on the west side of Clarkson Road (Today Clarkson Road North). It was built in 1853 by the Great Western Railway at the corner of the property which became known as Clarkson's Corner. The apostrophe in Clarkson's was removed from the sign in 1956, on the CNR station which burned down in 1962, although Corner had long since disappeared from usage.

The station brought commerce to local fruit and vegetable farmers, with corn, apples and especially strawberries being the main produce in Clarkson. In 1915, a sign was erected at the station declaring "Through this station passes more strawberries than any other station in Ontario."

To augment the existing 1,500-space parking structure, an additional garage with 1,200 spaces was built between June 2012 and April 2014.In 2018, Fortinos signed a deal with Metrolinx to have a PC Express kiosk at this station for online orders.

== Local bus service ==
The station is served by MiWay and Oakville Transit routes:

MiWay

Route		Destination	Availability
13	Glen Erin	North to Meadowvale Town Centre	All week
14	Lorne Park	East to Port Credit GO Station	Mon–Fri (off-peak)
14A	Lorne Park	East to Port Credit GO Station	Mon–Fri (rush hour)
23	Lakeshore	East to Long Branch GO Station via Port Credit GO Station	All week
29	Park Royal	North to South Common Centre	All week
45	Winston Churchill	North to Meadowvale Town Centre	All week
45A	Winston Churchill	North to Meadowvale Town Centre	Mon–Fri (rush hour)
110	University Express	North to City Centre via University of Toronto Mississauga	All week

Oakville Transit

Route		Destination	Availability
4	Speers-Cornwall	West to Bronte GO Station via Oakville station	All week
11	Linbrook	West to Oakville station	Mon–Fri
12	Winston Park	North to Laird & Ridgeway	Mon–Fri
