= Port Credit GO Station =

Railway station in Mississauga, Ontario, Canada

Port Credit
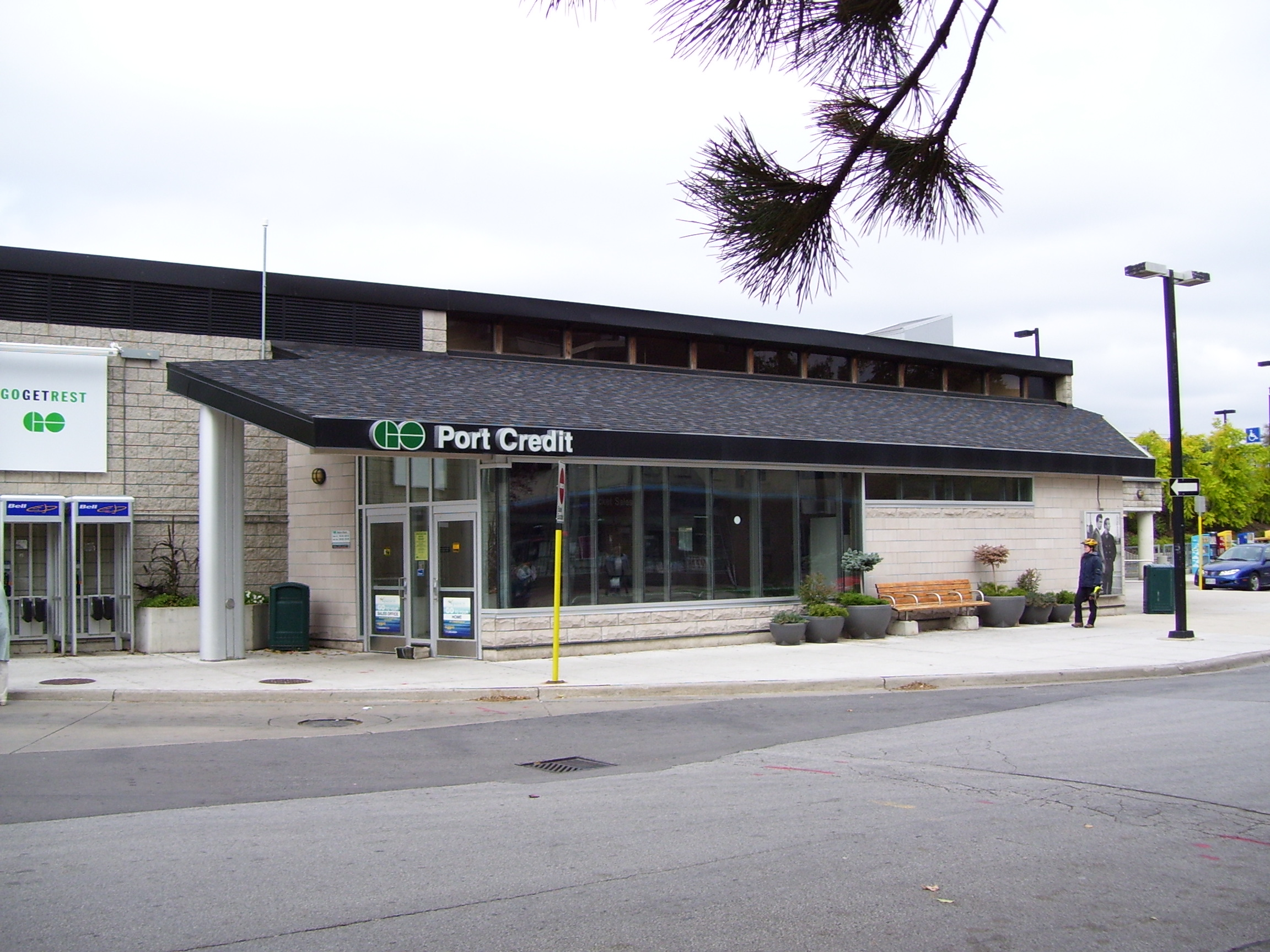
- Port Credit station building in 2007

General information
- Location: 30 Queen Street East; Mississauga, Ontario; Canada
- Coordinates: 43°33′22″N 79°35′13″W
- Owner: Metrolinx
- Platforms: 1 side platform, 1 island platform
- Tracks: 3
- Bus routes: 18
- Connections: MiWay

Construction
- Structure type: Station building
- Parking: 946 spaces
- Cycle facilities: Yes
- Accessible: Yes

Other information
- Station code: GO Transit: PO
- Fare zone: 10

History
- Opened: 1967; 59 years ago (GO Transit); TBD (Hurontario LRT)
- Electrified: September 2035; 8 years' time (Lakeshore West; planned)

Services
| Preceding station | GO Transit | Following station |
|---|---|---|
| Clarkson towards Confederation | Lakeshore West | Long Branch towards Union |
| Oakville towards Niagara Falls | Lakeshore West (off-peak express) | Exhibition towards Union |

Future services
| Preceding station | Metrolinx | Following station |
|---|---|---|
| Mineola toward Brampton Gateway | Hurontario LRT | Terminus |
Former services
| Preceding station | Canadian National Railway | Following station |
|---|---|---|
| Lorne Park toward Suspension Bridge | Niagara Falls – Toronto; Local stops | Lakeview toward Toronto |
Location

Port Credit GO Station is a GO Transit train and bus station in Mississauga, Ontario, Canada. Located in the Port Credit neighbourhood, it is a stop on the Lakeshore West line train service.

Port Credit GO has been identified by Metrolinx as a transportation mobility hub, where different forms of transportation come together. These hubs serve as the origin, destination, or transfer point for a significant number of trips, and provide transportation for a concentrated point of employment, housing, and recreation. The under-construction Hurontario LRT will serve the station.

== History ==
Station platforms in 2026

The Great Western Railway opened the first railway station in Port Credit in 1855 at Stavebank Road, just west of the current GO Transit facility. That station burned to the ground and was replaced by Canadian National closer to the location of the current station, which opened in 1967 when GO Train service began on the Lakeshore West line. The Great Western Railway was purchased in 1882 by the Grand Trunk Railway, which was absorbed into the Canadian National Railway in 1920.

== MiWay bus service ==
The station is served by MiWay (Mississauga Transit) routes:

| Route | | Destination | Availability |
|---|---|---|---|
| 2 | Hurontario | North to City Centre Transit Terminal | All week |
| 8 | Cawthra | North to City Centre Transit Terminal | Mon–Sat |
| 14 | Lorne Park | West to Clarkson GO Station | Mon–Fri (off-peak) |
| 14A | Lorne Park | West to Winston Churchill via Clarkson Credit GO Station | Mon–Fri (rush hour) |
| 23 | Lakeshore | East to Long Branch GO Station; West to Clarkson GO Station | All week |

== Gallery ==
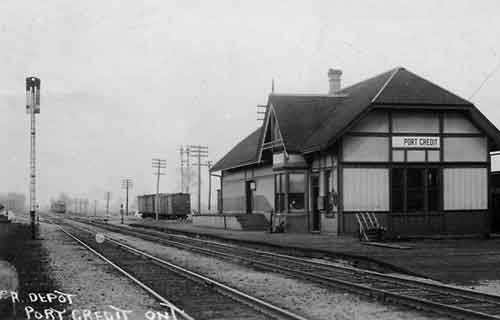
The GTR station in 1912

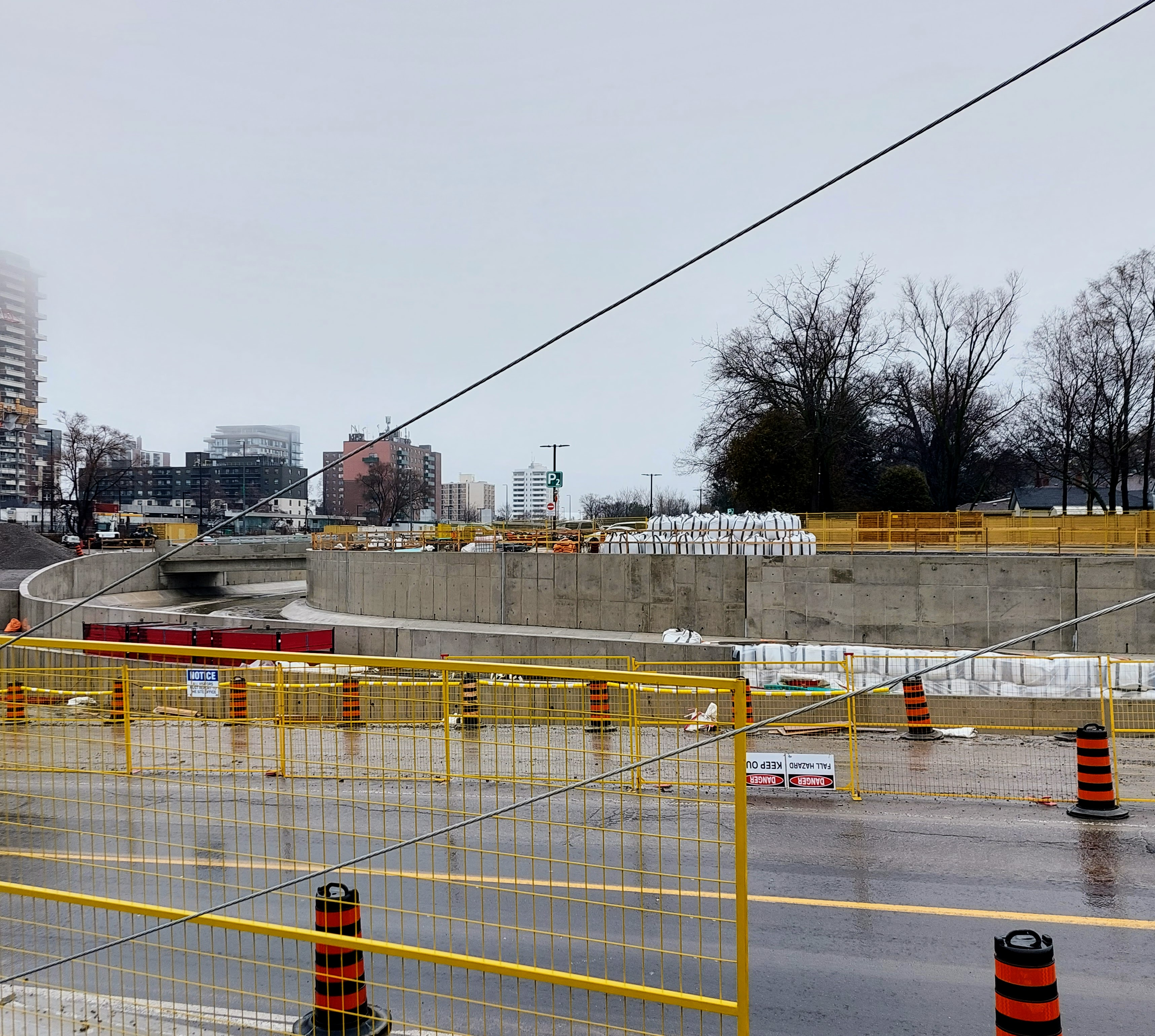
Hurontario LRT under construction
