= Oakville Transit =

Public transit system in Oakville, Ontario

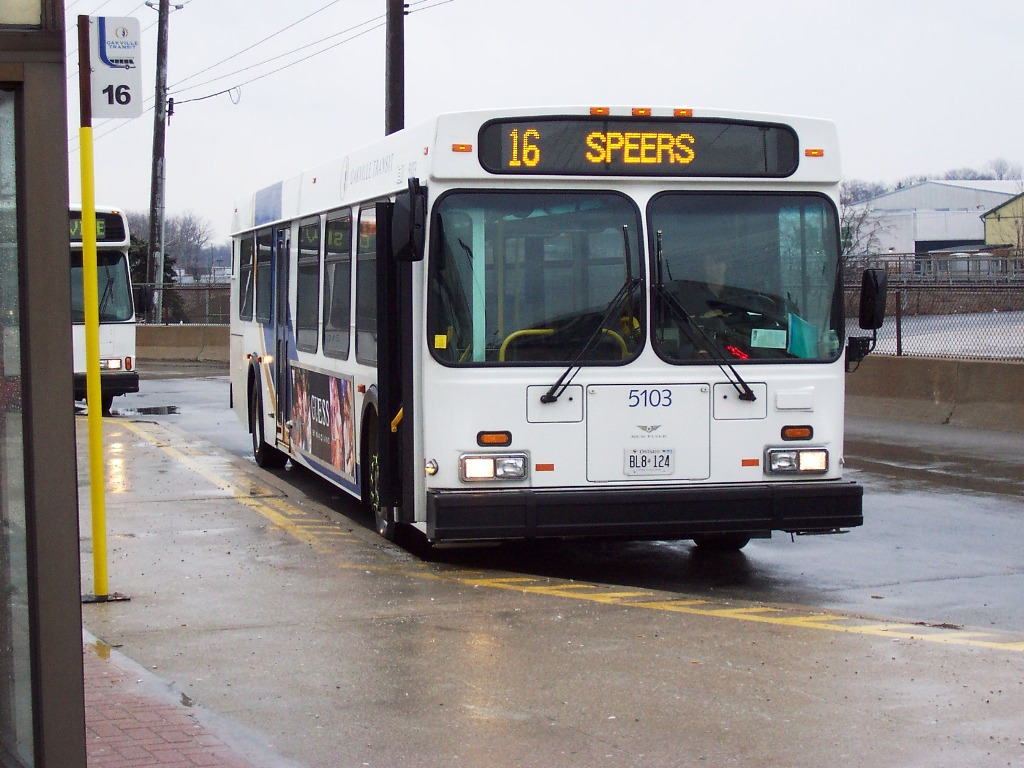
- Bus 5103 driving the former Route 16 at Oakville GO Station
- Founded: 1972
- Headquarters: 430 Wyecroft Road
- Locale: Oakville, Ontario
- Service area: Burlington, Oakville, Mississauga
- Service type: Bus service, Paratransit
- Routes: 21 Regular 1 Express 8 School
- Stops: 1,111
- Fleet: 101 buses, 24 small capacity transit vehicles
- Annual ridership: 2,167,452 (2022)
- Operator: Town of Oakville
- Website: oakvilletransit.ca

Oakville Transit is the public transit agency in Oakville, Ontario, Canada since 1972. It is a department of the town and a member of the Canadian Urban Transit Association. It offers the typical conventional bus service, a para-transit service called care-A-van, and two on-demand shared ride services in North and Southeast Oakville, and the neighbourhoods of Falgarwood and Palermo West/Bronte Creek; Home to Hub and the Ride On-Demand Pilot program. The care-A-van and Ride On-Demand services take riders directly to a specific address while the Home to Hub service takes riders to designated transit hubs near their location.

Logo for Oakville Transit, 1973

The original logo for Oakville Transit, no longer in use, was by designer Stuart Ash.

== Services ==
Oakville Transit operates mainly fixed-route bus services, but has slowly grown its on-demand service offerings since 2022.

The Oakville GO Station, located at 214 Cross Avenue, is the main bus terminus. Oakville Transit connects with Burlington Transit in Burlington to the west, MiWay in Mississauga to the east, GO Transit rail services to the south, and GO Transit bus services to the south and east. Bus routes service Oakville, Bronte, Appleby, and Clarkson GO stations, along with Via Rail and Amtrak services that operate out of Oakville GO Station. Bus services also service Highway 407 carpool parking lots at Trafalgar Road and Walkers Line in Burlington. East–west routes terminate service at their destination while loop routes maintain their service until returning to their starting terminal.

=== School Specials ===
Oakville Transit operates several routes known as 'School Specials'. School specials operate weekdays only based on the start and finish times of local schools.

The school specials routes serve White Oaks Secondary School, Holy Trinity Catholic Secondary School, Abbey Park High School, St. Ignatius of Loyola Catholic Secondary School, T. A. Blakelock High School, Oakville Trafalgar High School, and Garth Webb Secondary School.

Routes do not run on holidays, March Break or during the summer.

==== Senior Specials Routes ====
Before March 2020, Oakville Transit operated Senior Specials routes that travelled between local nursing homes and commercial centres throughout Oakville.

== Fleet ==
Oakville Transit has a fleet of 101 low-floor, fully accessible conventional buses and 24 home to hub/care-A-van (para transit) buses. All conventional busses are wheelchair-accessible with capacity for up to two wheelchair passengers per bus. All buses are equipped with Wi-Fi access and real-time bus tracking. By 2028, 50% of the Oakville Transit bus fleet will be converted to electric vehicles to help the Town of Oakville's meet its goal of net-zero emissions by 2050. As of November 2025, Oakville Transit has 15 conventional electric buses, and 15 smaller electric buses for their on-demand service.

== Fares ==
As of July 2025, cash fare is $4.00 for everyone ages 13 and older without a Presto card. Passengers using GO Transit can transfer on and off Oakville Transit free of charge so long as the passenger can show the driver their single, multi-ride GO ride ticket or by tapping a Presto card or contactless credit or debit card. Children ages 0–12 can ride all Oakville Transit bus services free of charge when travelling with an accompanying adult. Children travelling alone are required to tap their "child" Presto card when boarding the Oakville bus, but no fare will be deducted. Students/youths (13–19 years of age), and seniors (65 years of age and older) can ride fare-free when using their student, youth or senior Presto card. Customers in these categories travelling without a Presto card are still required to pay a full cash fare. Customers can also pay their Oakville Transit bus fares through the Presto e-tickets mobile application via smartphone or by using a contactless credit/debit card (Visa, Mastercard, American Express and Interac) and their associated mobile wallets by tapping these items on a Presto fare reader. The equivalent of the current Oakville Transit cash fare will be deducted.

Oakville Transit transfers are time-based, valid on any route in any direction of use for 2 hours from the time of initial boarding, including transfers to or from other neighbouring transit services in the Greater Toronto and Hamilton area (GTHA) such as Brampton Transit, Burlington Transit, Hamilton Street Railway (HSR) and MiWay. Customers paying by exact cash, deposit exact cash into the fare box and request a paper transfer, while customers paying by Presto card or by contactless credit or debit card tap onto the Presto machine and an electronic transfer is written on the card, which also includes free transfers to the Toronto Transit Commission (TTC), provided there is time remaining on the electronic transfer.

== Facilities ==
=== Terminals & Junctions ===
==== Oakville ====
- Oakville GO Station - via routes 1, 4, 10, 11, 13, 14/14A, 15, 18, 19, 20, 26, 28, 120, and 190
  - Connects with GO Transit Lakeshore West line
  - Connects with GO Transit bus routes 18 (and its branches), 21, 22, 56/56B/56C/56L/56R.
  - Connects with Via Rail Québec City–Windsor Corridor services, and Amtrak Maple Leaf service to the United States.
- Bronte GO Station - via routes 3, 4, 6, 10, 13, 18, 28, and 34
  - Connects with GO Transit Lakeshore West line
  - Connects with GO Transit bus routes 18A/18C/18F/18J
- South Oakville Centre (formerly known as Hopedale Mall) - via routes 3, 14/14A, 15, and 83
- Uptown Core, located near the intersection of Trafalgar & Dundas Street - via routes 1, 5, 19, 20, and 37
- Sheridan College (Trafalgar Road Campus) - via routes 1, and 6
  - Connects with GO Transit bus routes 22 & 56/56B/56C.

==== Mississauga ====
All Mississauga bus terminal stops connect to Mississauga's MiWay bus service.

- Clarkson GO Station - via routes 4, 11, and 12
  - Connects with GO Transit Lakeshore West line
  - Connects with MiWay routes 13, 14/14A, 23, 29, 45/45A, and 110
- Laird & Ridgeway - via route 5, 6, 12, and 120
  - Connects with MiWay routes 1 and 36
- Laird & Winston Churchill - via routes 5 & 6
  - Connects with MiWay routes 1 and 45

==== Burlington ====
All Burlington bus terminal stops connect to Burlington Transit bus services.

- Appleby GO Station - via routes 14/14A
  - Connects with GO Transit Lakeshore West line
  - Connects with GO Transit bus routes 18/18A/18C/18F/18J
  - Connects with Burlington Transit routes 1, 4, 10, 11, 25, 80, and 81
- Dundas & 407 GO Carpool Lot - via routes 5
  - Connects with GO Transit bus routes 12, 40, 41, and 47
  - Connects with Burlington Transit routes 2, 3, 6, 11, and 25

== Routes and connections ==
=== Regular fixed routes ===
Route		Direction & Terminus					Availability	Via	Notes
1	Trafalgar	IB	Trafalgar & 407 GO Carpool Lot	↺	OB	Oakville GO Station	All-week & Holidays	Sheridan College Trafalgar Campus and Uptown Core Terminal.	
3	Third Line	IB	Oakville Trafalgar Memorial Hospital	↺	OB	South Oakville Centre	All-week & Holidays	Bronte GO Station, Queenline Centre, The Abbey Plaza, Fox Creek Plaza, Sunvalley Square, and Bronte Village.	One-way loop when coming south from Third Line, goes west on Rebecca, south on Bronte, east on Lakeshore, and back north on Third Line.
4	Speers-Cornwall	WB	Bronte GO Station	↔	EB	Clarkson GO Station	All-week & Holidays	Bronte Plaza, Oakville Commons, Trafalgar Village, Oakville GO Station, Shops of Oakville South and Maple Grove Village.	EB travels to Mississauga.
5	Dundas	WB	Dundas/407 GO Carpool	↔	EB	Laird Road & Winston Churchill Boulevard	All-week & Holidays	Oakville Trafalgar Memorial Hospital, Sunvalley Square, Fox Creek Plaza, Rio Centre, Uptown Core Terminal and Sheridan College.	WB travels to Burlington.
6	Upper Middle	WB	Bronte GO Station	↔	EB	Laird Road & Winston Churchill	All-week & Holidays	The Abbey Plaza, Sheridan College, Upper Oakville Shopping Centre and Oakville Entertainment Centrum	EB travels to Mississauga.
10	West Industrial	IB	Oakville GO Station	↺	OB	Bronte GO Station	Mon–Fri (Peak service only)	Bronte Plaza, Oakville Commons and Trafalgar Village	CW loop west of Fourth Line during morning service; CCW loop during afternoon service.
11	Linbrook	WB	Oakville GO Station	↔	EB	Clarkson GO Station	Mon–Fri	Oakville Trafalgar High School and Clarkson Crossing	EB travels to Mississauga. CW loop east of Ford Dr. travelling EB; CCW loop travelling WB.
12	Winston Park	IB	Laird & Ridgeway	↺	OB	Clarkson GO Station	Mon–Fri	Oakville Entertainment Centrum	Travels to Mississauga. CW loop IB & OB west of Winston Churchill.
13	Westoak Trails	WB	Bronte GO Station	↔	EB	Oakville GO Station	All-week & Holidays	Halton Government Centre and Oakville Place Mall	
14	Lakeshore West	WB	Appleby GO Station	↔	EB	Oakville GO Station	All-week & Holidays	Downtown Oakville and South Oakville Centre	Travels to Burlington. 14 uses Great Lakes Boulevard while 14A does not.
14A	Lakeshore West	WB	Appleby GO Station	↔	EB	Oakville GO Station	All-week & Holidays	Downtown Oakville and South Oakville Centre	Travels to Burlington. 14 uses Great Lakes Boulevard while 14A does not.
15	Bridge	WB	South Oakville Centre	↔	EB	Oakville GO Station	All-week & Holidays	Trafalgar Village	
18	Glen Abbey South	WB	Bronte GO Station & Route 28	↔	EB	Oakville GO Station	All-week & Holidays	Queenline Centre, Dorval Crossing, Oakville Commons and Trafalgar Village	
19	River Oaks	NB	Oakville GO Station	↔	SB	Uptown Core Terminal	All-week & Holidays	Oakville Place Mall and White Oaks Secondary School	
20	Northridge	NB	Oakville GO Station	↔	SB	Uptown Core Terminal	All-week & Holidays	Upper Oakville Shopping Centre	CW loop west of Eighth Line.
26	Falgarwood	IB	Lancaster & Grosvenor	↺	OB	Oakville GO Station	Mon–Fri (Peak service only)	Oakville Place Mall	CW loop IB & OB near Lancaster & Grosvenor
28	Glen Abbey North	WB	Bronte GO Station & Route 18	↔	EB	Oakville GO Station	All-week & Holidays	Dorval Crossing, Oakville Commons and Trafalgar Village	
34	Pine Glen	IB	Pine Glen & Proudfoot and Colonel & Dundas	↺	OB	Bronte GO Station	Mon–Fri (Peak service only)	Halton Government Centre	Temporarily merged with Route 33 as of April 6, 2020. Large CW loop north of Upper Middle Road West.
37	Glenorchy	WB	Neyagawa Blvd + Sixteen Mile Dr	↔	EB	Wheat Boom Dr + Athabasca Common	All-week & Holidays	Uptown Core Terminal	Each end of the route loops. West end at Neyagawa Blvd and east end at Threshing Mill Blvd and Wheat Boom Dr.
120	East Industrial	IB	Laird & Ridgeway	↺	OB	Oakville GO Station	Mon–Fri (Peak service only)	Oakville Entertainment Centrum	Travels to Mississauga
121	Southeast Industrial	IB	Oakville GO Station	↺	OB	Industry & South Service	Mon–Fri (Peak service only)		On-demand service.
190	River Oaks Express	NB	Oakville GO Station	↔	SB	Glenaston & Trafalgar	Mon–Fri (Peak service only)		No stops between White Oaks Blvd. and Oakville GO station on Trafalgar Road. Operates 6 times per day, and 3 per time of day.

=== School Specials ===
Route		Route Type		Time of Day	Depart Time	Terminals			Arrival Time	Notes
19/71	White Oaks S.S.	19	River Oaks	Morning	7:30 am	Glenashton & Taunton	→	Oakville GO Station	7:48 am (White Oaks), 7:56 am (Oakville GO)	Exit at McCraney & Montclair for White Oaks S.S. Operates as a special Route 19 service.
19/71	White Oaks S.S.	19	River Oaks	Afternoon	2:45 pm	McCraney & Montclair	→	Uptown Core Terminal	3:10 pm	Operates as a special Route 19 service.
19/71	White Oaks S.S.	Standard School Special		Afternoon	2:48 pm	McCraney & Montclair	→	Uptown Core Terminal	3:23 pm	
19/71	White Oaks S.S.	Standard School Special		Afternoon	2:50 pm	Sixth Line & Culham	→	Westoak Trails & Bronte	3:07 pm	
80	Holy Trinity S.S.	Standard School Special		Morning	7:39 am	Eight Line & Falgarwood	→	Holy Trinity S.S.	8:05 am	Connects with Route 19 at stops #2887, #2899, & #2900
80	Holy Trinity S.S.	Standard School Special		Afternoon	2:40 pm	Holy Trinity S.S.	→	Eight Line & Falgarwood	3:04 pm	Connects with Route 19 at stops #2887, #2899, & #2900
81/82	Abbey Park H.S. Loyola S.S. North Loyola S.S. North (82)	81A	Abbey Park/Loyola (North)	Morning	7:30 am	Upper Middle & Reeves	→	Loyola S.S.	8:05 am	
81/82	Abbey Park H.S. Loyola S.S. North Loyola S.S. North (82)	81B	Abbey Park/Loyola (North)	Morning	7:35 am	Dorval & North Service	→	Loyola S.S.	8:05 am	
81/82	Abbey Park H.S. Loyola S.S. North Loyola S.S. North (82)	81N	Abbey Park/Loyola (North)	Afternoon	2:47 pm	Loyola S.S.	→	Bronte & Richview	3:25 pm	Nearly identical to Route 82. Makes an additional stop at Abbey Park H.S.
81/82	Abbey Park H.S. Loyola S.S. North Loyola S.S. North (82)	82	Loyola (North)	Afternoon	2:35 pm	Loyola S.S.	→	Bronte & Richview	3:05 pm	Nearly identical to Route 81N. Skips Abbey Park H.S stop.
81	Abbey Park H. S. Loyola S. S. South	Standard School Special		Afternoon	2:47 pm	Loyola S.S.	→	Dorval & North Service	3:08 pm	
83	T. A. Blakelock H.S.	Blakelock (West)		Afternoon	2:50 pm	Rebecca & Lees Lane	→	Oakville GO Station	3:10 pm	Via South Oakville Centre.
83	T. A. Blakelock H.S.	Blakelock (East)		Afternoon	2:50 pm	T. A. Blakelock H. S.	→	Bridge Road & Third Line	3:10 pm	Via Church & Dunn.
84	Oakville Trafalgar H.S.	Oakville Trafalgar H.S.		Morning	7:45 am	Oakville Trafalgar H.S.	→	Wynten Way & Kingsway (Clearview)	8:00 am	
84	Oakville Trafalgar H.S.	Oakville Trafalgar H.S.		Afternoon	3:05 pm	Oakville Trafalgar H.S.	→	Wynten Way & Kingsway (Clearview)	3:20 pm	
84	Oakville Trafalgar H.S.	11	Linbrook	Morning	7:52 am	Oakville GO Station	→	Oakville Trafalgar H.S.	8:04 am	Departs in the afternoon from Devon & Wedgewood. Operates as a special Route 11 service.
84	Oakville Trafalgar H.S.	11	Linbrook	Afternoon	3:05 pm	Devon & Wedgewood	→	Oakville GO Station	3:19 pm	Departs in the afternoon from Devon & Wedgewood. Operates as a special Route 11 service.
86	Garth Webb S.S.	Standard School Special		Morning	7:50 am	Garth Webb S.S.	→	Fourth & Glen Valley	8:15 am	
86	Garth Webb S.S.	A		Afternoon	3:00 pm	Garth Webb S.S.	→	Fourth & Glen Valley	3:30 pm	Routes A and B diverge after Pine Glen & Postmaster.
86	Garth Webb S.S.	B		Afternoon	3:00 pm	Garth Webb S.S.	→	Westoak Trails & Glen Valley	3:30 pm	Routes A and B diverge after Pine Glen & Postmaster.

=== Late Night Service routes ===
Late-night routes are on-demand and drop-off only. Departs from Oakville GO Station.

Route		Pick-up Terminal	Extent of Coverage	Availability	Route Coverage
54	East Oakville	Oakville GO Station	Winston Churchill Boulevard & Dundas Street East	Mon–Fri 11:40 pm to 6:00 am	Follows: Route 4 (East of the Oakville GO Station); Route 5A along Sixteen Mile Drive; Routes 11, 12, 19, 20, 24 and 26.
55	West Oakville	Oakville GO Station	Burloak Drive and Colonel William Parkway	Mon–Fri 11:40 pm to 6:00 am	Follows: Route 3; Route 4 (West of the Oakville GO Station); Routes 5/5A and 6 (West of Neyagawa Boulevard); Routes 14/14A (West of Kerr Street); Routes 13, 15, 18, 28, 33 and 34.

=== Former routes ===
Route		Discontinued	Direction & Terminus					Availability	Via	Notes
2	Lakeshore	September 4, 2016	WB	Bronte GO Station	↔	EB	Dundas & Hampshire	All-week & Holidays	Downtown Oakville	
3A	Third Line		IB	Oakville Trafalgar Memorial Hospital	↺	OB	South Oakville Centre	All-week & Holidays	Bronte GO Station, Queenline Centre, The Abbey Plaza, Fox Creek Plaza, Sunvalley Square, and Bronte Village.	
5A	Dundas	September 1, 2024	WB	Walkers Line (Dundas & 407 GO Carpool Lot)	↔	EB		All-week & Holidays	Oakville Trafalgar Memorial Hospital, Sunvalley Square, Fox Creek Plaza, Rio Centre, Uptown Core Terminal and Sheridan College.	5A was an alternate routing of the 5 route that briefly traveled along Sixteen Mile Drive and Wheat Boom Drive in North Oakville.
16	Speers	September 6, 2009	IB	Rebecca & Bronte	↺	OB	Oakville GO Station	Mon–Sat	Halton Regional Centre and South Oakville Centre	
17	Kerr	March 2, 2019	IB	Church & Dunn	↺	OB	Oakville GO Station	All-week & Holidays	Downtown Oakville and Trafalgar Village	Known as Kerr/Eastlake prior to September 6, 2009.
21	Clearview	September 4, 2016	IB	Maple Grove Village	↺	OB	Clarkson GO Station	Mon–Fri	Clarkson Community Centre	Traveled to Mississauga. Intended to connect with Route 11 as its outer terminal was Maple Grove village prior to the cancellation of Route 21.
22	Upper Glen Abbey	September 4, 2016	IB	Pine Glen & Proudfoot	↺	OB	Bronte GO Station	Mon–Fri	Via Halton Government Centre	
24	South Common	June 29, 2025	WB	Oakville GO Station	↔	EB	South Common Centre	All-week & Holidays	Sheridan College, Uptown Core Terminal and Shops on Dundas	Traveled to Mississauga. CW loop at Uptown Core travelling EB; CCW travelling WB.
25	Aspen Forest	September 4, 2016	IB	Clarkson GO Station	↺	OB	Maple Grove Village	Mon–Fri	Lakeside Park	Traveled to Mississauga. Weekday peak service route.
27	White Oaks	September 6, 2009	IB	Oxford & Upper Middle	↺	OB	Oakville GO Station	Mon–Sat	Via Oakville Place Mall	
29	Uptown Core	September 6, 2009	IB	Walmart Oakville and Dundas & Postridge	↺	OB	Oakville GO Station	Mon–Sat		
30	Crosstown	September 6, 2009	IB	Uptown Core	↺	OB	South Oakville Centre	Mon–Sat	Queenline Centre	This route did not operate on Sundays.
31	Bridge - Great Lakes	May 6, 2012	WB	Rebecca & Burloak and Lakeshore & Great Lakes	↔	EB	Bronte GO Station	Mon–Fri		Via Bronte Village.
32	Burloak - Great Lakes	September 4, 2016	WB	RioCan Centre Burloak	↔	EB	Bronte GO Station	All-week & Holidays	South Oakville Centre	Route extended to Bronte GO from South Oakville Centre on July 3, 2011. Known as Burloak North
33	Palermo	April 6, 2020	IB	Colonel & Dundas	↺	OB	Bronte GO Station	All-week & Holidays	Halton Government Centre	Temporarily suspended. Merged with Route 34 as of April 6, 2020. CW loop IB & OB west of Bronte Road.
102	Winston Park	September 4, 2016	NB	Clarkson GO Station	↔	SB	Bristol Circle & Dover Gate	Mon–Fri	Clarkson Crossing and Oakville Entertainment Centrum	Traveled to Mississauga. Weekday peak service route.
110	West Industrial North	May 6, 2012	WB	Bronte GO Station	↔	EB	Oakville GO Station			Express version of Route 10.
180	Glen Abbey Express	September 6, 2009	N/A	Monastery & Dorval	→	EB	Oakville GO Station	Mon–Fri7:20 am only	Dorval Crossing	Only 3 stops along route. S-shaped route travelling west to Third Line then east to Oakville GO.
200	Northridge	September 6, 2009	IB	Walmart Oakville and Dundas & Postridge	↺	OB	Oakville GO Station	Mon–Fri	Oakville Place Mall	
240	Sheridan College Express	August 30, 2014	WB	Sheridan College	↔	EB	South Common Centre	Unknown		Traveled to Mississauga. Operated three trips per day. Buses were not operated by Oakville transit. Began service September 1, 2013.

==== Senior Specials Routes ====
Senior Special routes were discontinued indefinitely due to the COVID-19 pandemic.

Route		Discontinued	Start Terminal(s)	Destination(s)	Notes
90	John R. Rhodes Residences Special	March 23, 2020 Indefinitely suspended due to the COVID-19 pandemic); Removed from the Oakville Transit website in 2023	John R Rhodes Seniors Residence	Walmart Oakville & South Oakville Centre	Bus service would first travel to Walmart Oakville via Downtown Oakville, Oakville Commons, Trafalgar Village, and Oakville Place Mall. Following this trip, bus service would then make a round-trip directly to South Oakville Centre. Route 90 would alternate between these routes. Operated on Fridays only from 9:30 am to 4:30 pm.
91	Oakville Senior Citizens Residence Special	March 23, 2020 Indefinitely suspended due to the COVID-19 Pandemic); Removed from the Oakville Transit website in 2023	Oakville Senior Citizens Residence (OSCR)	Oakville Place Mall	Via Bronte Village Mall, South Oakville Centre, and Fortinos Oakville Lakeshore. Operated on Thursdays only from 9:30 am to 3:00 pm. Route 91 was the only senior specials service that operated similarly to a standard public bus route.
92	Knox Heritage Place Special	March 3, 2019	Knox Heritage Seniors Place	Walmart Oakville & Trafalgar Village	Service alternated between two routes. One travelled directly to Walmart Oakville round-trip, while the 2nd route travelled to Trafalgar Village via Oakville Place Mall. Operated on Fridays only from 9:30 am to 2:40 pm.
N/A	Metro Charter	March 23, 2020 Indefinitely suspended due to the COVID-19 Pandemic); Removed from the Oakville Transit website in 2023	Queen's Avenue Apartment, 350 Lynnwood Drive, 1230 & 1359 White Oaks Boulevard, Knox Heritage	Metro (Upper Oakville Shopping Centre)	Bus service was sponsored by Metro at Upper Oakville Shopping Centre. Operated on Thursdays only from 10:30 am to 1:00 pm with two round trips per location.
N/A	Oakville Place Charter	March 23, 2020 Indefinitely suspended due to the COVID-19 Pandemic); Removed from the Oakville Transit website in 2023	6 Senior's Residences across the Bronte and Kerr Street area, Knox Heritage Place, Queen's Avenue Apartment, and 1230 & 1359 White Oaks Boulevard	Oakville Place	Operated once per day on the first Tuesday of every month.

== See also ==
- List of public transit authorities in Canada
