= Lakeshore West line =

Commuter rail service in Ontario, Canada

Lakeshore West
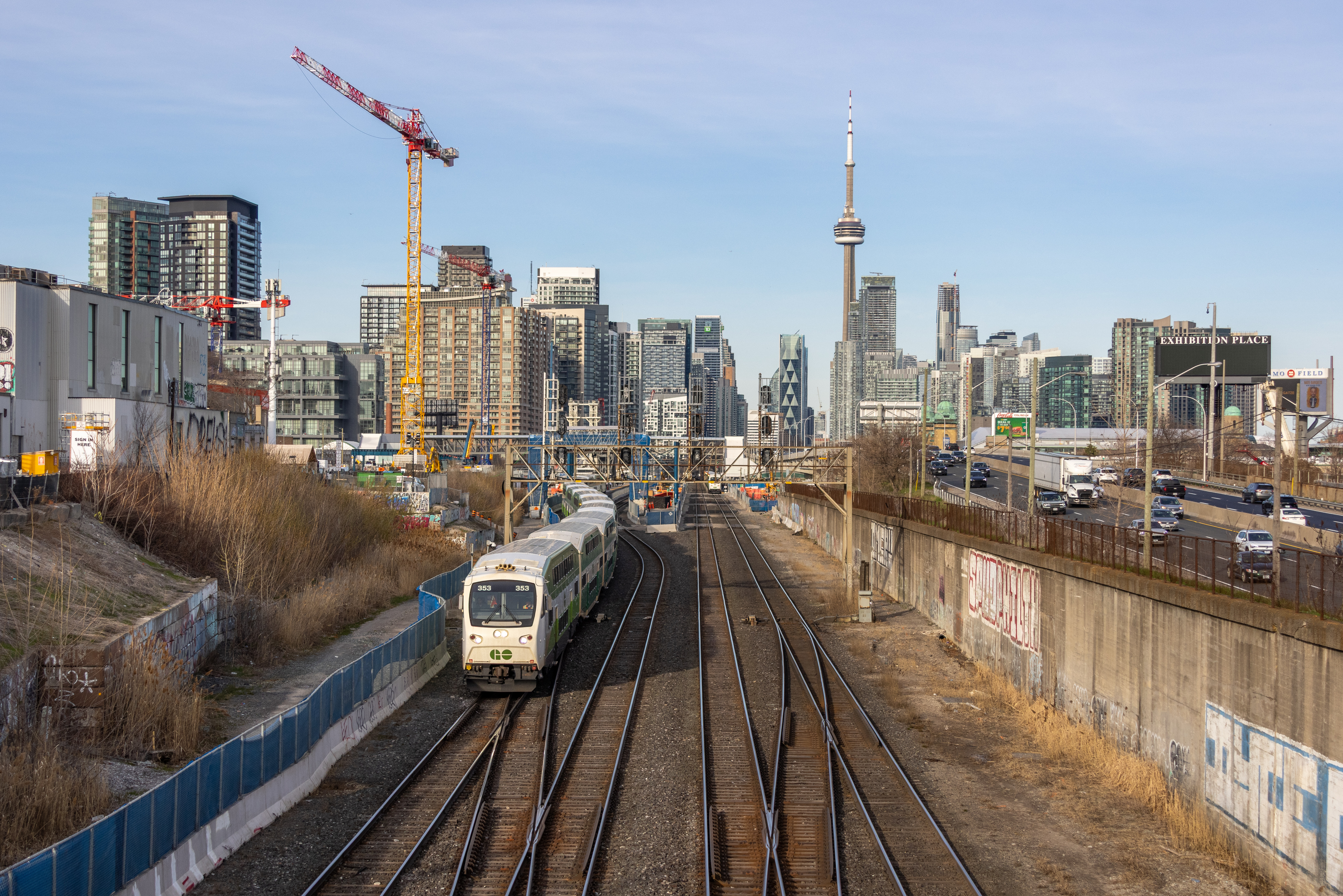
- The Lakeshore West rail corridor west of Exhibition GO Station in 2026

Overview
- Service type: Commuter rail
- System: GO Transit rail services
- Locale: Greater Toronto and Hamilton Area; Niagara Region
- First service: May 23, 1967; 59 years ago
- Current operator: Alstom
- Daily ridership: 33,500 (2019)

Route
- Termini: East: Union; West: Hamilton and Niagara Falls
- Stops: 16 (1 under construction)
- Distance travelled: 132 km (82 mi)

Technical
- Track gauge: 1,435 mm (4 ft 8 1/2 in) standard gauge
- Operating speed: 153 km/h (95 mph) (speed limit); 150 km/h (93 mph) (locomotive max)
- Average length: 10–12 coaches
- Track owners: Metrolinx; Canadian National Railway; Canadian Pacific Kansas City

The Lakeshore West line is one of the seven passenger rail lines of the GO Transit system in the Greater Toronto Area, Ontario, Canada. It extends west from Union Station in Toronto to Hamilton, along the shore of Lake Ontario. Some train trips extend past Hamilton to St. Catharines and Niagara Falls. It is the busiest railway line in the GO system.

== History ==
The Lakeshore West line is the oldest of GO's services, opening as part of the then-unified Lakeshore line on GO Transit's first day of operations on May 23, 1967. The first train, numbered 946 left at 5:50 am from Oakville bound for Toronto, ten minutes before service began out of Pickering. During the three-year experiment, all day GO Train service ran hourly from Oakville to Pickering with limited rush hour train service to Hamilton. The experiment proved to be extremely popular; GO Transit carried a million riders during its first four months, and averaged 15,000 per day soon after.

Service began running west from Union, stopping at Mimico, Long Branch, Port Credit, Lorne Park, Clarkson, and Oakville. Rush-hour trains ran to Bronte, Burlington and Hamilton, at the former CN railway station at James Street.

GO trains started serving the Canadian National Exhibition in August 1967 from an older platform just west of the Dufferin Street bridge over the Lakeshore West line and the Queen Elizabeth Way. For the 1968 Exhibition season, temporary booths were set up to handle passengers, which topped 24,000 on the season's busiest day. This prompted the need for a proper station with additional capacity, and by the 1968 Royal Agricultural Winter Fair, the current Exhibition GO Station was built and put in service.

Lorne Park Station closed within the first year of the line's operation after seeing little usage.

Appleby GO Station opened on September 19, 1988, followed by Aldershot GO Station on May 25, 1992. The opening of Aldershot coincided with the extension of all day and weekend service from Oakville to Burlington, however, this was reversed due to budget cuts on July 3, 1993.

On April 29, 1996, James Street station was replaced by the Hamilton GO Centre. All day service to Burlington was restored on May 1, 2000, and extended to Aldershot on September 7, 2007. On June 29, 2013, all day service was increased to operate trains every 30 minutes.

A third track was added between Sixteen Mile creek and the Port Credit station. Combined with additional work undertaken since the early 1990s, this gives the Lakeshore West line at least three tracks from Union Station through to Bayview Junction.

In 2009 as a pilot project, GO began operating express trains to Via Rail stations in St. Catharines and Niagara Falls on weekends and holidays during Niagara Region's busy summer tourist season. The service was provided again during the 2010 season, and was officially made permanently recurring starting in 2011. In 2019, the weekend express service began operating year-round, and on May 23, 2023, year-round weekday service to Niagara Falls was enhanced, with two additional round trips per day to Niagara Falls.

West Harbour GO Station opened in July 2015, serving as a second Hamilton terminus for rush-hour train service. In August 2021, all-day service was extended to this station.

On January 7, 2019, one weekday round-trip was extended beyond West Harbour station to Niagara Falls.

On April 28, 2024 as part of a larger increase in GO Train service, Metrolinx introduced 15-minute weekend service from Oakville GO and Union Station.

== Service ==
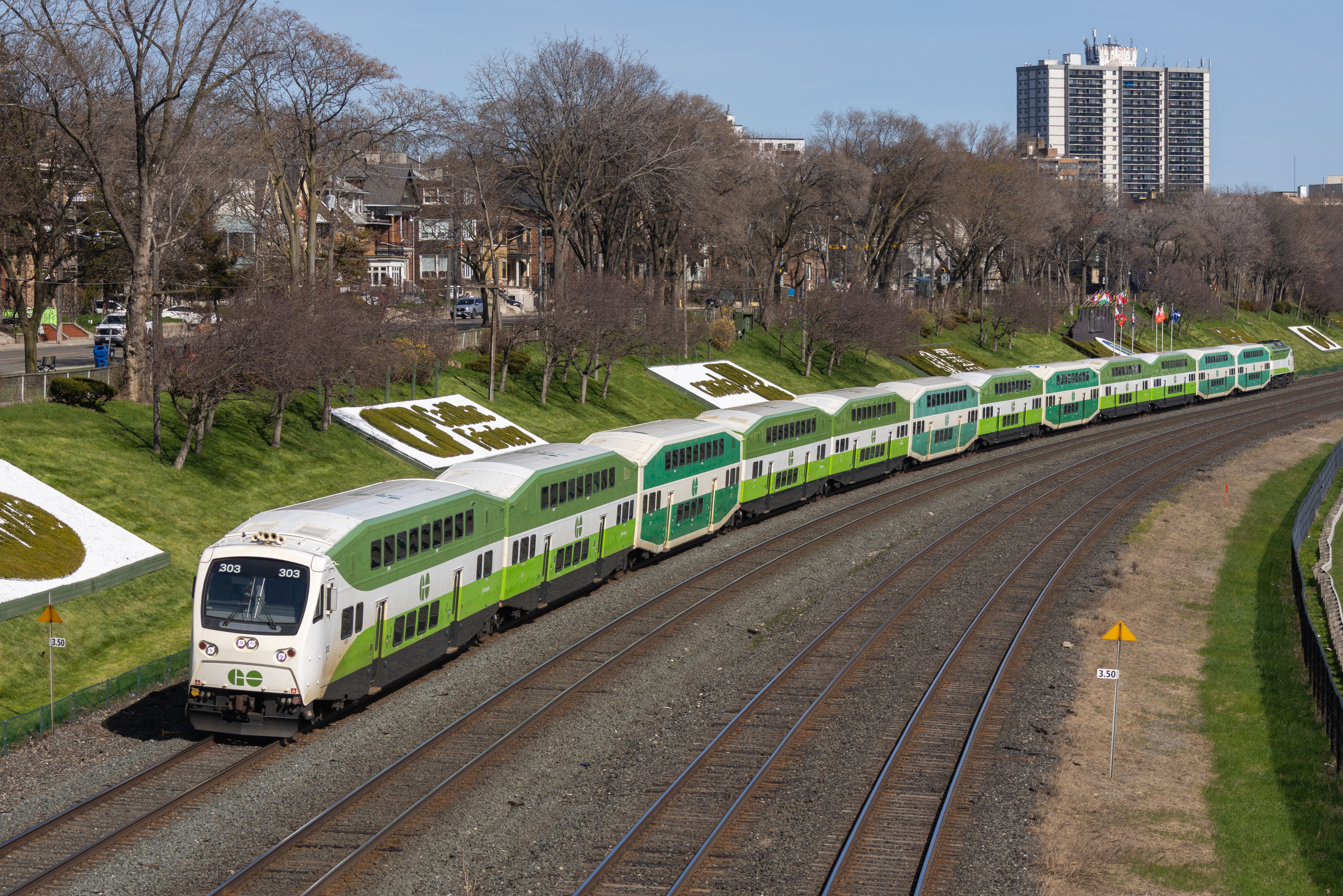
A Lakeshore West westbound train past Exhibition at the Roncesvalles pedestrian bridge

On weekdays, local service operates every 30 minutes east of Aldershot and every 60 minutes at West Harbour. In addition, eleven daily express trains operate during peak and off-peak periods, of which four operate between Toronto and Hamilton GO Centre, two to Confederation, two to Aldershot, and three to Niagara Falls.

On weekends, local service operates every 30 minutes between Union and Aldershot, and every 60 minutes between Aldershot and West Harbour. Three express trains per day operate between Toronto and Niagara Falls.

All off-peak local trains, as well as some peak trains, are through-routed with the Lakeshore East line to Oshawa, making it possible to travel Oshawa and Hamilton or Niagara Falls without having to change trains in Toronto.

== Future ==
As part of the 2008 Metrolinx regional transportation plan entitled The Big Move, the agency identified an express all-day service between Hamilton and Oshawa (via Toronto Union) as one of its top 15 priorities. This project, formally dubbed GO Expansion is expected to reduce some trip times by 20%.

GO Expansion will involve electrifying the Lakeshore West line up to Burlington GO Station, and introduce electrified rail services that will operate up to every 3.5 minutes during peak hour, as well as expanding off-peak service beyond Aldershot GO Station into Hamilton and beyond to Niagara Falls. GO Expansion also involves upgrading multiple stations to include enhanced passenger accommodations, as well as raising the platforms at all GO Stations on the line to be the same height as the coaches, removing the need to step up into the coach and making all sections of the trains accessible.

In early 2019, Niagara Falls, New York officials expressed interest in having GO Transit expand rail service over the border to the Niagara Falls station in New York. Metrolinx stated that there are specific restrictions when a train leaves Ontario, or any province in Canada, that require a different set of inspection criteria and standards in order to legally enter the United States which would make a stop at the station difficult.

In June 2020, Metrolinx released a business case for a proposed station near Humber Bay, named Park Lawn GO Station. The station will be integrated with a residential development being constructed at the same time.

=== Niagara Region ===
Metrolinx is currently planning to expand rail service between Hamilton and Niagara Falls. The project includes three new stations, two upgraded stations, and more than 25 kilometres of new track. Originally planned for completion in 2023, Metrolinx halted the delivery process for the stations in the Niagara extension in November 2018 when the newly-elected 42nd Parliament of Ontario rescinded its funding for their construction. In order to be constructed, the stations would instead be dependent on private financing.

In 2015, Confederation GO Station (in East Hamilton, near Stoney Creek) was announced with a completion date of 2019. Construction on the rail station began in 2022 and opened in 2025.

In June 2016, Ontario Minister of Transportation Steven Del Duca announced that regular service would be extended to Grimsby, with the Grimsby GO Station expected to open in 2021. In 2023, enhanced service was then-expected to begin to the St. Catharines and Niagara Falls Via Rail stations which will be upgraded to support increased GO service. Ahead of the 2025 Ontario general election, all major political parties promised to build the Grimsby GO station if elected. Construction on the station broke ground in July 2026 with completion now planned for 2027.

In March 2022, Metrolinx released an initial business case for a proposed Beamsville GO Station within the Town of Lincoln. It would be located on the west side of Ontario Street in Beamsville along the rail line. Metrolinx expects the proposed station would increase GO Transit ridership by 48,000 trips annually by 2041 including 7,000 to 8,000 tourists annually. The proposed station could possibly include customer parking, a pick-up and drop-off area, bicycle parking, and an area for local and regional public transit buses.

== Ownership ==
In order to facilitate service expansions, GO Transit's parent agency Metrolinx has gradually acquired portions of the Lakeshore West corridor from the freight railway companies Canadian National Railway (CN) and Canadian Pacific Kansas City (CPKC). Most of the Lakeshore West line operates along the Oakville subdivision, which was entirely owned by CN prior to 1998.

On March 31, 2010, GO acquired its first segment of the Oakville subdivision, between Union Station and 30th Street in Etobicoke (just west of GO's Willowbrook Rail Maintenance Facility). On March 27, 2012, GO purchased a second segment immediately to the west, extending its ownership to a point just west of Fourth Line in Oakville. On March 22, 2013, Metrolinx purchased a third segment extending its ownership westward to a point just west of Burlington station, where the CN Halton Subdivision joins the line.

In addition to the Union Station Rail Corridor, these three segments represent Metrolinx's current ownership of the line. CN continues to own the tracks between Burlington and the Desjardins Canal, as well as the Grimsby subdivision that carries trains into Niagara Region. CPKC owns the tracks between the Desjardins Canal and Hamilton GO Centre.

== Station list ==
Most off-peak local trains, as well as some peak trains, continue as part of the Lakeshore East line after stopping at Union Station, with no train change required.

Service legend
Local	Operates at all times
Peak express	Operates on weekday peak periods in the peak direction. Most westbound trains stop at Exhibition.
Off-peak express	Operates outside of peak periods
↓ ↑	Non-stop at this station in this specific direction

Station	Municipality	Services			Connections	Notes
Station	Municipality	Local	Peak express	Off-peak express	Connections	Notes
Union	Toronto	●	●	●	Canadian/Corridor/Maple Leaf TTC	Through service to the Lakeshore East line
Exhibition	Toronto	●	↑	●	TTC	Future connection to Ontario Line
Mimico	Toronto	●	|	|	TTC	
Long Branch	Toronto	●	|	|	TTC; MiWay	
Port Credit	Mississauga	●	|	●	MiWay	Future connection to Hurontario LRT
Clarkson	Mississauga	●	●	|	MiWay; Oakville Transit	
Oakville	Oakville	●	●	●	Corridor/Maple Leaf Oakville Transit	Rail service every 15 minutes runs east of this station
Bronte	Oakville	●	●	|	Oakville Transit	
Appleby	Burlington	●	●	|	Burlington Transit; Oakville Transit	
Burlington	Burlington	●	●	●	Burlington Transit	
Aldershot	Burlington	●	●	●	Corridor/Maple Leaf Burlington Transit; Hamilton Street Railway	Rail service every 30 minutes runs east of this station
Hamilton	Hamilton		●		Hamilton Street Railway	Terminus of Hamilton branch Bus service only during off-peak, future pedestrian connection to Hamilton LRT
West Harbour	Hamilton	●	●	●	Hamilton Street Railway	Rail service every 60 minutes runs east of this station
Confederation	Hamilton	●	●	●	Hamilton Street Railway	
Grimsby (opens 2027)	Grimsby		|	|	GO Transit GO Transit bus services	Under construction
St. Catharines	St. Catharines		●	●	Maple Leaf; St. Catharines Transit	Limited rail service of three trains per day to these stations
Niagara Falls	Niagara Falls		●	●	Maple Leaf Niagara Falls Transit; WEGO Niagara Falls Visitor Transportation	Limited rail service of three trains per day to these stations

Stopping patterns of Lakeshore West line as of May 2025.

== Bus routes ==
The 11, 12, 15, 16 and 18 bus routes are part of GO Transit's Lakeshore West corridor, serving the Greater Toronto and Hamilton Area and Niagara Region. All except for Route 16 are classified as rail-support, with some acting as rail replacement before and after train service hours, and others running throughout the day to extend service to areas not reached by rail. Route 16 (Hamilton/Toronto Express) is part of GO Transit's core bus network.

Most buses in the Lakeshore West corridor run primarily along the Queen Elizabeth Way (QEW), as well as the Gardiner Expressway in Toronto, extending from the Union Station Bus Terminal through the western Golden Horseshoe.

=== Stops ===
Route		Major stops	Notes
Lakeshore West	11	Aldershot GO; Hamilton GO; West Harbour GO; Confederation GO; Grimsby Carpool; Beamsville Carpool; St. Catharines GO; Brock University	Limited weekday service
Niagara Falls/Toronto	12	Burlington Carpool; Burlington GO; Confederation GO; Grimsby Carpool; Beamsville Carpool; St. Catharines Fairview Mall; Niagara College; Niagara Falls P&R; Niagara Falls Bus Terminal	
Niagara Falls/Toronto	12A	Burlington Carpool; Burlington GO; Confederation GO; Grimsby Carpool	Weekday Toronto-bound
Niagara Falls/Toronto	12B	Burlington GO; Niagara Falls P&R; Niagara Falls Bus Terminal	Express service
Niagara Falls/Toronto	12D	Burlington GO; St. Catharines Fairview Mall; Niagara College; Niagara Falls P&R; Niagara Falls Bus Terminal	Express service
Brantford/Burlington	15	Aldershot GO; McMaster University; McMaster Innovation Park; Brantford Bus Terminal	
Brantford/Burlington	15A	Aldershot GO; McMaster University	Seasonal Friday eastbound
Brantford/Burlington	15B	Aldershot GO; McMaster University; McMaster Innovation Park; Brantford Bus Terminal; Six Nations of the Grand River Reserve; Mississaugas of the Credit First Nation	
Hamilton/Toronto Express	16	Union; Hamilton GO	
Lakeshore West	18	Aldershot GO; Hamilton GO	
Lakeshore West	18A	Union; Oakville GO; Bronte GO; Appleby GO; Burlington GO; Aldershot GO; Hamilton GO; West Harbour GO	Limited weekend express
Lakeshore West	18B	Union; Port Credit GO; Clarkson GO; Oakville GO; Burlington GO; Aldershot GO; Hamilton GO	Eastbound limited express (weekend only)
Lakeshore West	18C	Union; Port Credit GO; Clarkson GO; Oakville GO; Bronte GO; Appleby GO; Burlington GO; Aldershot GO; Hamilton GO	Sunday–Friday service
Lakeshore West	18E	Union; Port Credit GO; Clarkson GO; Oakville GO; Bronte GO; Appleby GO; Burlington GO; Aldershot GO; West Harbour GO	Eastbound service (Sunday-Thursday only)
Lakeshore West	18F	Union; Oakville GO; Bronte GO; Appleby GO; Burlington GO; Aldershot GO; Hamilton GO	Westbound express (Monday-Saturday only)
Lakeshore West	18G	Union; Oakville GO; Burlington GO; Aldershot GO; Hamilton GO	Weekday limited eastbound express
Lakeshore West	18H	Union; Port Credit GO; Clarkson GO; Oakville GO	
Lakeshore West	18J	Union; Port Credit GO; Clarkson GO; Oakville GO; Bronte GO; Appleby GO; Burlington GO; Aldershot GO; Hamilton GO; West Harbour GO	Saturday-Thursday service
