= LIUNA Station =

Convention center in Hamilton, Ontario, Canada

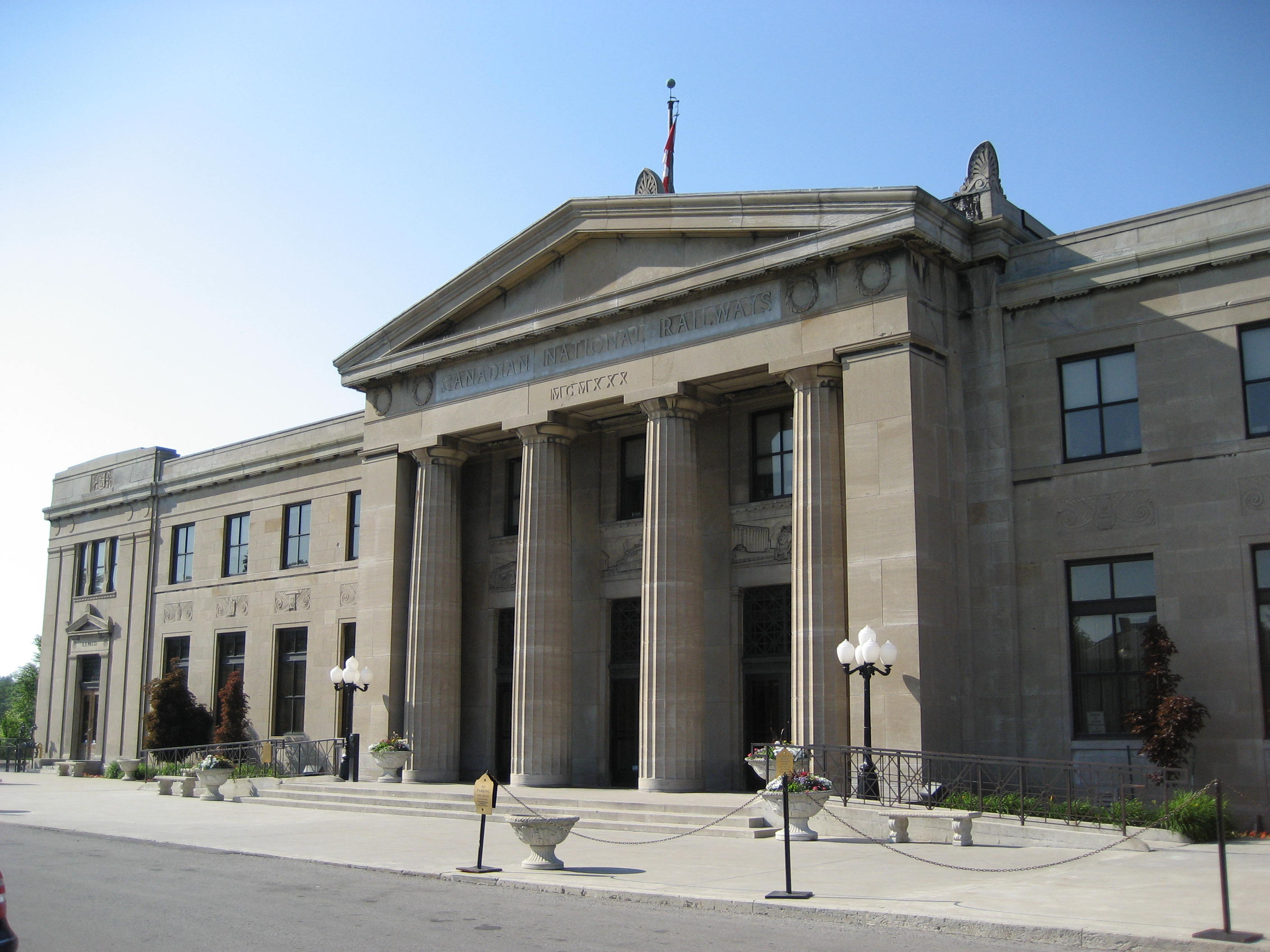
- Former CNR station building

General information
- Location: 360 James Street North; Hamilton, Ontario; Canada
- Coordinates: 43.2658°N 79.8646°W
- Owner: LIUNA

History
- Opened: 1931
- Closed: 1993

Former services
Preceding station	Via Rail	Following station
Burlington 1989–1993 toward Toronto	Maple Leaf	Grimsby toward New York
Burlington West 1981–1989 toward Toronto	Maple Leaf	Grimsby toward New York
Preceding station	Canadian National Railway	Following station
Dundas toward Sarnia	Grand Trunk Railway; Main Line	Oakville toward Montreal
Stoney Creek toward Suspension Bridge	Niagara Falls – Toronto; Local stops	Aldershot toward Toronto
Terminus	Hamilton – Allandale	Aldershot toward Allandale
Dundas toward Owen Sound	Owen Sound – Hamilton	Terminus
Rymal toward St. Thomas	St. Thomas – Hamilton	Terminus
Preceding station	GO Transit	Following station
Aldershot towards Toronto	Lakeshore West 1967–1996	Terminus
Location

LIUNA Station is a banquet and convention centre in central Hamilton, Ontario. The building opened in 1931 as Hamilton C.N.R. Station and served as a passenger and freight railway station.

== History ==
LIUNA Station, former CN Railway James Street Station, on the east side of James Street North at Murray Street, was built between 1929 and 1931 by the Canadian National Railway to a design by architect John Schofield.

The property is one of the National Historic Sites of Canada and was designated under the federal Heritage Railway Stations Protection Act and under Part IV of the Ontario Heritage Act by City of Hamilton By-law 95-115. Portions of the building were protected by the Ontario Heritage Trust in 1999.

In 1967, GO Transit took over CN's commuter service between Toronto and Hamilton, and in 1978 all other CN passenger service was transferred to Via Rail.

In 1992, Via Rail withdrew service from James Street Station as well as Burlington and Dundas, consolidating all service in the Hamilton-Burlington area at the new Aldershot GO Station in Burlington.

GO Transit closed the James Street station in 1993 and moved any remaining service to the Hamilton GO Centre, only one and a half kilometres directly south on James Street.

The Laborers' International Union of North America (LIUNA) bought and renovated the station, and in 2000, the station was reopened as LIUNA Station, an events centre with catering facilities for weddings, dances, and other special events. It is no longer federally protected.

== See also ==
- The adjoining West Harbour GO Station opened in 2015.
