= Dundas station (Grand Trunk Railway) =

Former railway station in Dundas, Ontario, Canada

Dundas
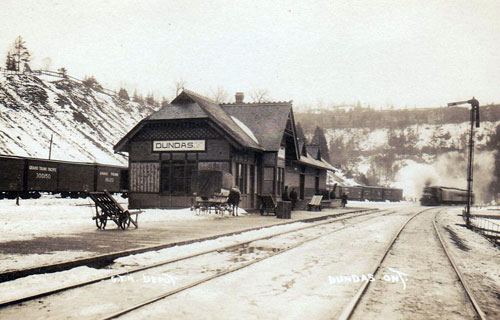

General information
- Location: Dundas, Ontario; Canada
- Coordinates: 43°16′22″N 79°58′28″W
- Tracks: 2
- Connections: Canada Coach Lines

Other information
- Status: Building demolished

History
- Opened: 1864
- Closed: 1990

Former services
Preceding station	Amtrak	Following station
Brantford toward Chicago	International 1982–1990	Burlington West toward Toronto
Preceding station	Canadian National Railway	Following station
Copetown toward Sarnia	Grand Trunk Railway; Main Line	Hamilton toward Montreal
Copetown toward Owen Sound	Owen Sound – Hamilton	Hamilton Terminus
Location

Dundas station was a passenger station in Dundas, Ontario, Canada. It was located halfway up the Niagara Escarpment west of downtown Dundas, near where Hamilton Regional Road 8 (formerly Ontario Highway 8) crosses under the railway tracks.

== History ==
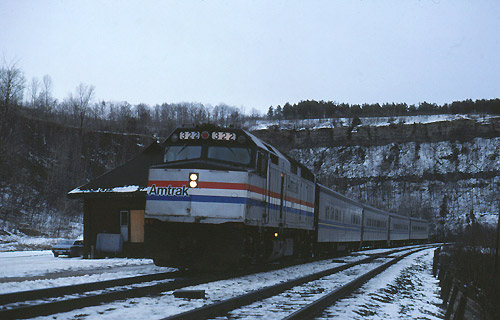
The International Limited at Dundas in 1983

The Great Western Railway (GWR) put their line through Dundas in 1853, but it wasn't until 1864 that the first station was built. They amalgamated with the Grand Trunk Railway (GTR) in 1882, who constructed a new station building in 1904 and double tracked the line. The GTR was absorbed by the Canadian National Railway (CNR) in 1923. Via Rail continued to provide passenger train service to the station from 1977 until the mid 1980s. A fire seriously damaged the station in 1984 and it was decided to move the historic structure to a more suitable site. The building collapsed while it was being dismantled and it could not be saved. The VIA/Amtrak International continued to stop until it was rerouted in 1990. A restricted fire access route from Highway 8 is the only reminder of a railway station in the area.
