= Bayview Junction =

Coordinates: 43°17′14″N 79°53′29″W

Bayview Junction

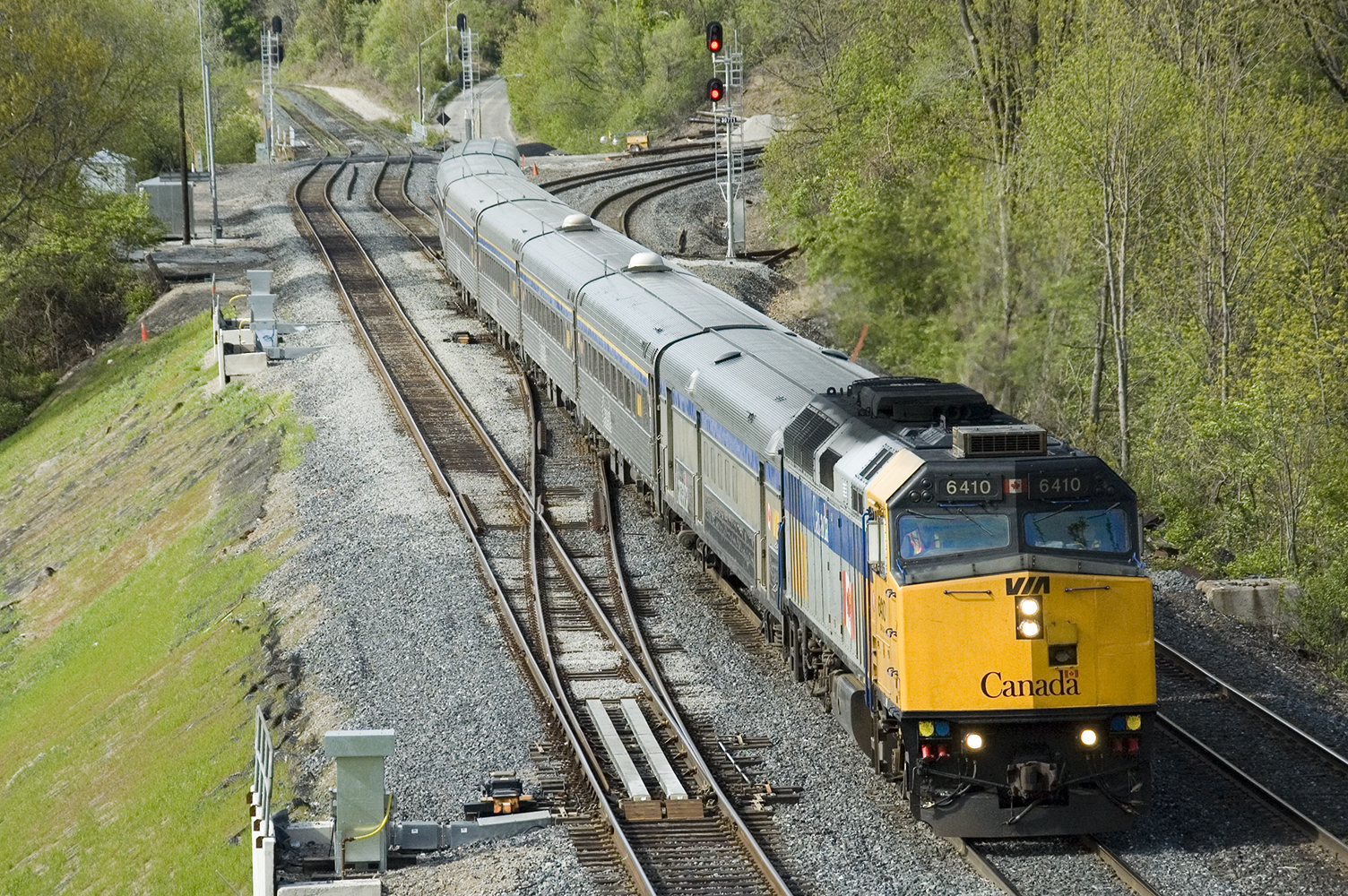
A Via Rail Corridor train clears the junction in 2007.

Bayview Junction is a major railway junction in southern Ontario, Canada. It is located at the intersection of three of the nation's busiest rail lines and is a popular location for railfans and trainspotters.

Located at the western end of Lake Ontario, this wye junction draws its name from the view of Burlington Bay (Hamilton Harbour) to the east. Bayview Junction is located in the city of Hamilton, immediately adjacent to its boundary with the city of Burlington. The railway lines bisect the property of the Royal Botanical Gardens, providing a picturesque setting.

== Rail lines ==
Bayview was determined by geography, with railway lines running along the level ground parallel to the northern shore of Lake Ontario increasingly constrained by the Niagara Escarpment as they approach the western end of the lake.

There are four major railway lines that intersect at Bayview; three operated by the Canadian National Railway (CN) and one by the Canadian Pacific Kansas City (CPKC):

== CN/Metrolinx Oakville Subdivision ==
The three-track Oakville Subdivision runs from Bayview east to Union Station in downtown Toronto, passing through the town of Oakville. It runs parallel to the lakeshore.

== CN Dundas Subdivision ==
The double-track Dundas Subdivision runs from Bayview west to London, passing through the town of Dundas, immediately west of Bayview, as it climbs up the Niagara Escarpment.

== CN Grimsby Subdivision ==
The mostly single-track Grimsby Subdivision runs from Bayview south to Niagara Falls, passing through Hamilton.

== CPKC Hamilton Subdivision ==
In addition to the CN lines intersecting at Bayview, the Canadian Pacific Kansas City (CPKC) has a line which crosses over the CN lines on a grade-separated overpass. The CPKC Hamilton Subdivision, going from Hamilton to Guelph Junction, runs parallel to the CN Grimsby Subdivision immediately east of Bayview at Hamilton Junction. There also exists a crossover here between the CPKC Hamilton Subdivision and the CN/Metrolinx Oakville Sub for Lakeshore West GO Trains servicing Hamilton GO Centre.

== Train operations ==
The CN Dundas Subdivision and CN Oakville Subdivision constitute CN's main line running from Chicago, Illinois, to Toronto. The CN Grimsby Subdivision provides CN with access to United States railways in Buffalo, New York, thus making it a busy junction for freight traffic.

The rapid population growth in the Greater Toronto Area resulted in the establishment of GO Transit Lakeshore West line commuter rail service on the Grimsby and Oakville Subdivisions in 1967. Additionally, Via Rail Canada provides intercity passenger rail services on all three CN lines.

The CPKC Hamilton Subdivision links the industrial city of Hamilton and U.S. railway interchange traffic further south in Buffalo with the railway's mainline from Detroit, Michigan to Toronto at Guelph Junction. This line carries freight traffic and rush hour GO trains to and from Hamilton and is not as heavily used as the CN lines.

Daily traffic density can vary. Upwards of 45 freight trains and 30–40 passenger trains per day can pass through Bayview Junction on both the CN and CPKC tracks.

== Railfanning ==
Several locations in and around the Royal Botanical Gardens provide viewing of the railway lines.

- A pedestrian bridge crosses the CN Oakville Subdivision immediately east of the junction. It is located in the Laking Gardens section of the Royal Botanical Gardens.
- A location near a parking lot adjacent to the gardens allows one to view CPKC Hamilton West, providing a view of the CPKC Hamilton Subdivision.
- A location partway down the pedestrian staircase on the Hamilton side of the York St. high level bridge permits viewing of GO Transit commuter trains and CPKC yard trains crossing the Desjardins Canal, as well as a daily Amtrak train to New York City, as well as Norfolk Southern, Southern Ontario Railway, and CN trains.
- A walkway in the Royal Botanical Gardens Rock Garden provides a view of the double-track Dundas Subdivision.
