= Bronte GO Station =

Railway station in Oakville, Ontario, Canada

Bronte
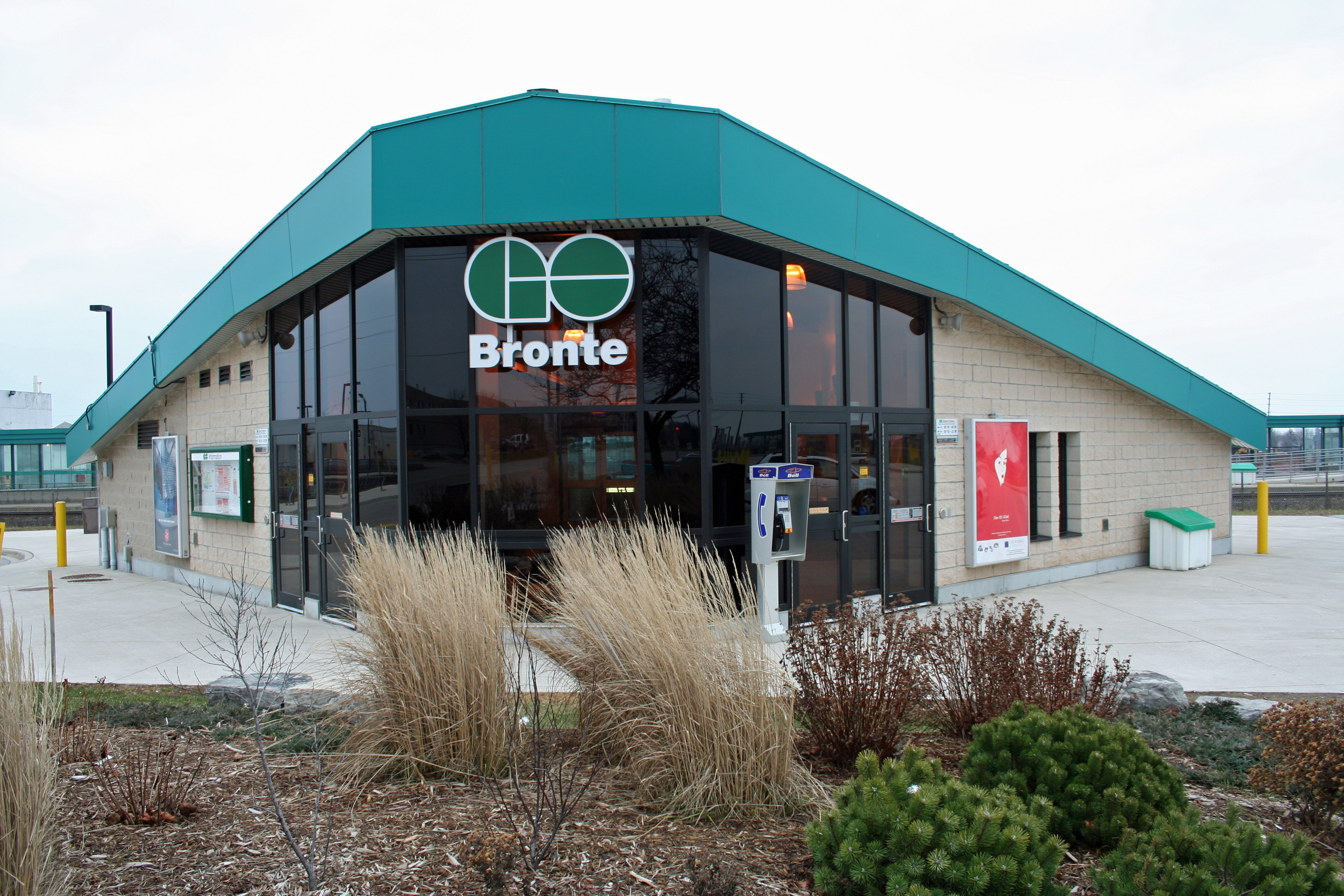
- Station entrance in 2008

General information
- Location: 2104 Wyecroft Road; Oakville, Ontario; Canada
- Coordinates: 43°25′02″N 79°43′20″W
- Owner: Metrolinx
- Platforms: 1 side and 1 island platform
- Tracks: 3
- Bus routes: 18
- Bus stands: 8
- Connections: Oakville Transit

Construction
- Structure type: Station building
- Parking: 2,424 spaces
- Cycle facilities: Racks and shelters
- Accessible: yes

Other information
- Station code: GO Transit: BO
- Fare zone: 14

History
- Opened: November 1967; 59 years ago
- Electrified: September 2035; 8 years' time (planned)
- Former names: Oakville West (1967–1995)

Services
Preceding station	GO Transit	Following station
Appleby towards Confederation	Lakeshore West	Oakville towards Union
Appleby towards Hamilton or Niagara Falls	Lakeshore West (peak express)	Oakville towards Union
Former services at CN station
Preceding station	Canadian National Railway	Following station
Burlington toward Suspension Bridge	Niagara Falls – Toronto; Local stops	Oakville toward Toronto
Location

Bronte GO Station is a train station in the GO Transit network located in Oakville, Ontario, Canada. It is a stop on the Lakeshore West line and there is an adjacent bus loop for connecting local Oakville Transit bus routes.

In September 2008 the station parking lot was expanded with a new entrance on Wyecroft Road. In January 2011, approximately 175 spaces were made available in the south lot which can be entered from Speers Road. When the project is completed the south lot will provide 300 parking spaces, with stairs and ramps to the platforms.

A Bronte Station Master Plan was completed in 2013, with key recommendations to be coordinated with ongoing improvements. This included considering extending the east tunnel to the south side of the tracks to a relocated bus loop or improve existing west tunnel connections to the existing loop and add more bus bays. Improvements already started, and was completed by Spring 2016, which included repaving the south parking lot and the addition of 200 new spaces as well as upgrades to platform canopies and shelters.

== History ==
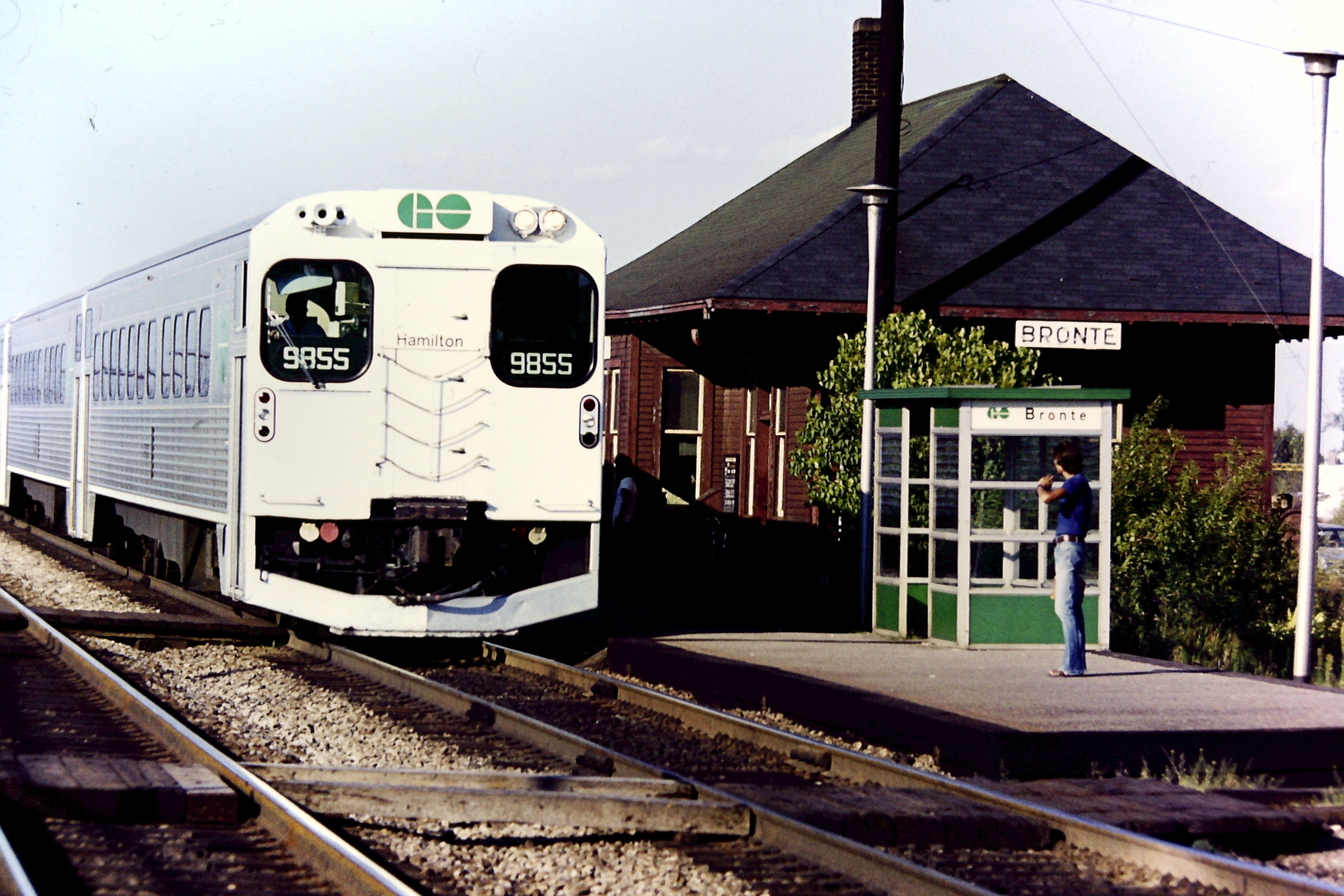
Historic GTR building was the original site of the GO Station

The first Bronte railway station was built around 1900 by the Grand Trunk Railway, on the south side of the tracks just east of Bronte Road, about 1.5 kilometres west of the current site.

GO Transit began operating the Lakeshore line on May 23, 1967, providing only rush hour service beyond Oakville. When the GO Station was relocated, in November 1967, it had been given the name Oakville West to distinguish it from the original station. Subsequently, the historic name was restored for the community of Bronte where the station is located, in the west end of Oakville.

== Connecting bus routes ==
Oakville Transit

- 3/3A Third Line
- 4 Speers-Cornwall
- 6 Upper Middle
- 10 West Industrial (Peak Service only)
- 13 Westoak Trails
- 18 Glen Abbey South
- 28 Glen Abbey North
- 33 Palermo (Peak Service only)
- 34 Pine Glen (Peak Service only)
