= St. Catharines station =

Railway station in Ontario, Canada

St. Catharines
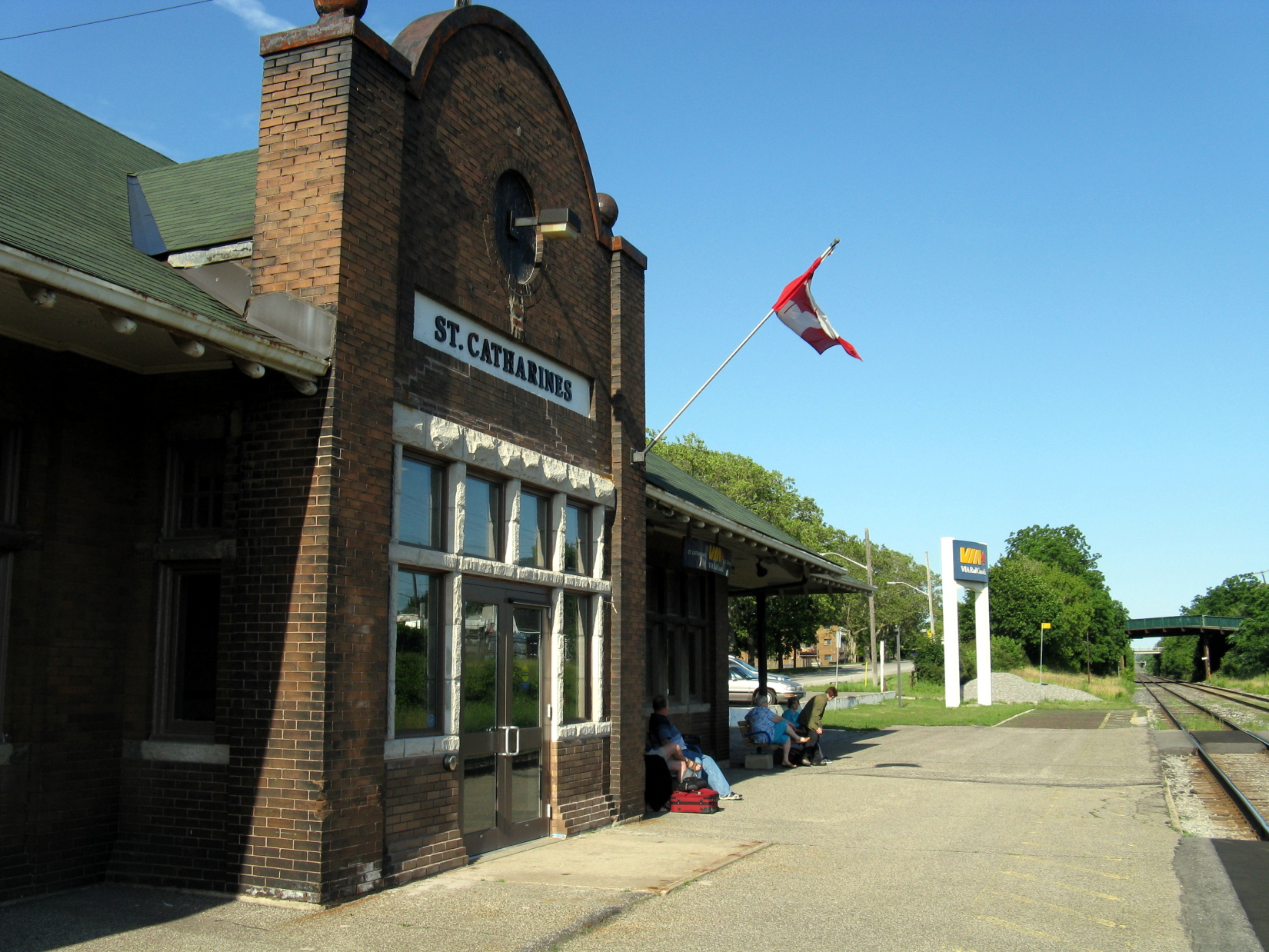

General information
- Location: 5 Great Western Street; St. Catharines, Ontario; Canada
- Coordinates: 43°08′52″N 79°15′23″W
- Platforms: 1 side platform
- Tracks: 2
- Connections: Niagara Region Transit

Construction
- Structure type: Unstaffed station
- Parking: Yes
- Cycle facilities: Covered bicycle rack
- Accessible: Yes

Other information
- Station code: GO Transit: SCTH; Via Rail: SCAT; Amtrak: SCA
- Fare zone: 83 (GO Transit)

History
- Opened: 1917
- Rebuilt: 1988, 1994

Passengers
- Apr–Jul 2019: 15 per day ▼7.3% (GO Transit)

Services
Preceding station	Via Rail	Following station
Grimsby toward Toronto	Maple Leaf	Niagara Falls, Ontario toward New York
Preceding station	GO Transit	Following station
Confederation towards Union	Lakeshore West (peak express)	Niagara Falls Terminus
Confederation towards Union	Lakeshore West (off-peak express)	Niagara Falls Terminus
Former services
Preceding station	Canadian National Railway	Following station
Jordan toward Toronto	Niagara Falls – Toronto; Local stops	Merritton toward Suspension Bridge

Heritage Railway Station (Canada)
- Official name: VIA Rail Station
- Designated: 1994
- Reference no.: 4625
Location

St. Catharines station is a railway station in St. Catharines, Ontario, Canada. It is served by the Maple Leaf train between Toronto and New York City and is a stop on the Lakeshore West line of GO Transit. The station is a designated Heritage Railway Station.

== History ==
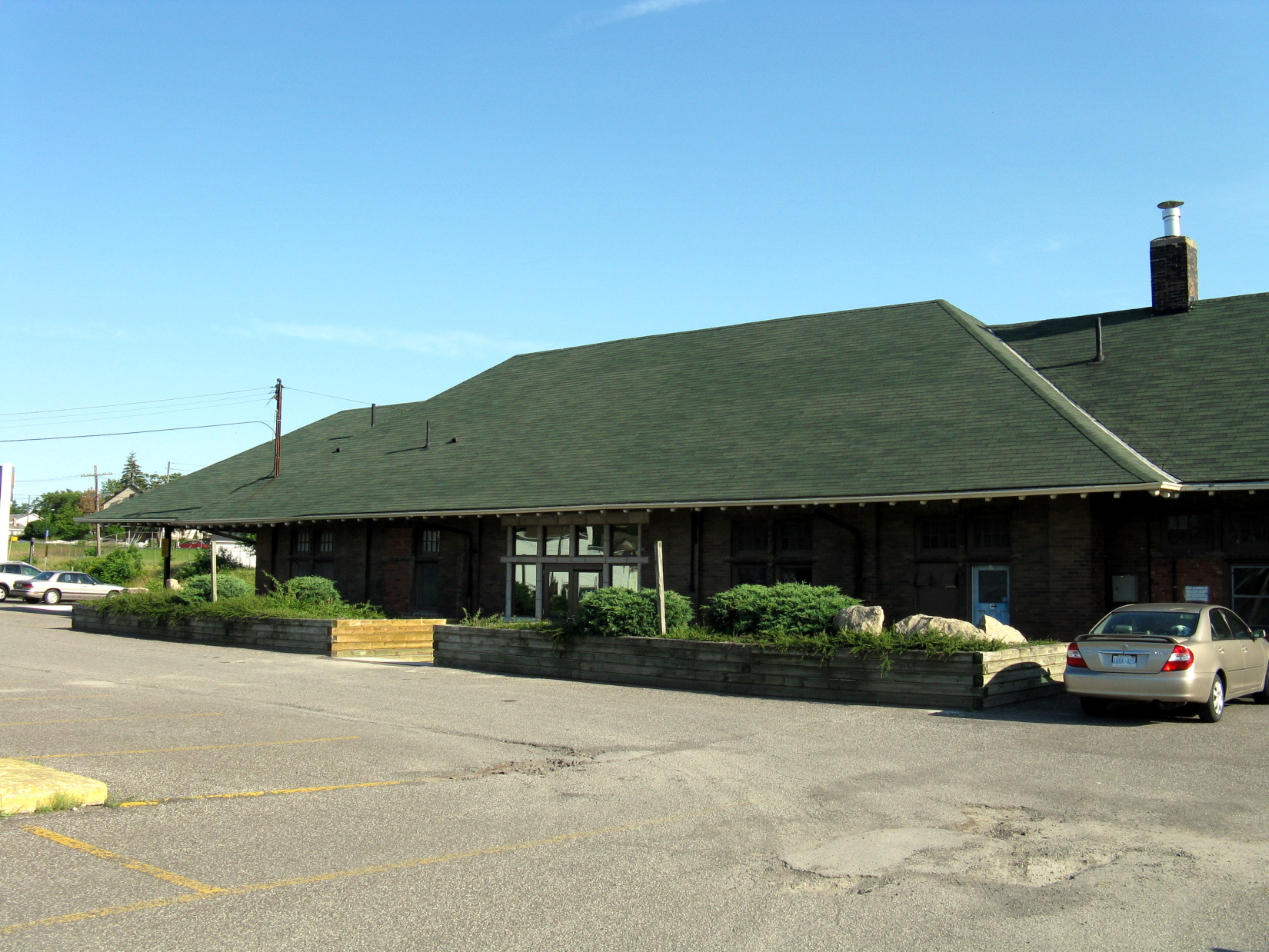
St Catharines Via Rail station

The single level pavilion-style station was built and opened in 1917 by the Grand Trunk Railway and acquired by CN Rail in 1923 who used it for passenger service. Via Rail gained ownership in 1986 It is the third station to be built on the site, first in 1853 by Great Western Railway and then 1898 by Grand Trunk. It was renovated in 1988 and 1994, but neither changed the appearance of the structure.

The station was formerly staffed by Via Rail, but the ticket agent was replaced by an automated kiosk in October 2012. A similar station was also built in Berlin, New Hampshire around the same time in 1917.

== Service ==
As of May 2024, GO Transit operates three daily round trips on the Lakeshore West regional rail service between Toronto and Niagara Falls.

On weekdays, GO Transit bus route 11 connects St. Catharines station to Hamilton West Harbour, Hamilton Centre and Aldershot stations, as well as Brock University.

Via Rail and Amtrak jointly operate a single daily round trip on the Maple Leaf train service between Toronto and New York City.
