= West Harbour GO Station =

Railway station in Hamilton, Ontario, Canada

West Harbour
- Station entrance in 2019

General information
- Location: 353 James Street North; Hamilton, Ontario; Canada
- Coordinates: 43°16′00″N 79°51′58″W
- Owner: Metrolinx
- Platforms: 2 side platforms
- Tracks: 2
- Bus routes: 11 18
- Connections: Hamilton Street Railway: 4, 20 A-Line Express

Construction
- Parking: 300 spaces
- Cycle facilities: Yes
- Accessible: Yes

Other information
- Station code: GO Transit: WR

History
- Opened: July 9, 2015

Services
| Preceding station | GO Transit | Following station |
|---|---|---|
| Aldershot towards Union | Lakeshore West | Confederation Terminus |
| Aldershot towards Union | Lakeshore West (peak express) | Confederation towards Niagara Falls |
| Aldershot towards Union | Lakeshore West (off-peak express) | Confederation towards Niagara Falls |
Location

West Harbour GO Station is a regional rail station in the North End neighbourhood of Hamilton, Ontario, Canada. The station has been served by GO Transit's Lakeshore West line since July 9, 2015. There is hourly service between West Harbour and Toronto's Union Station, seven days a week. Via Rail service may eventually be provided.

== History ==
=== CN James Street Station ===
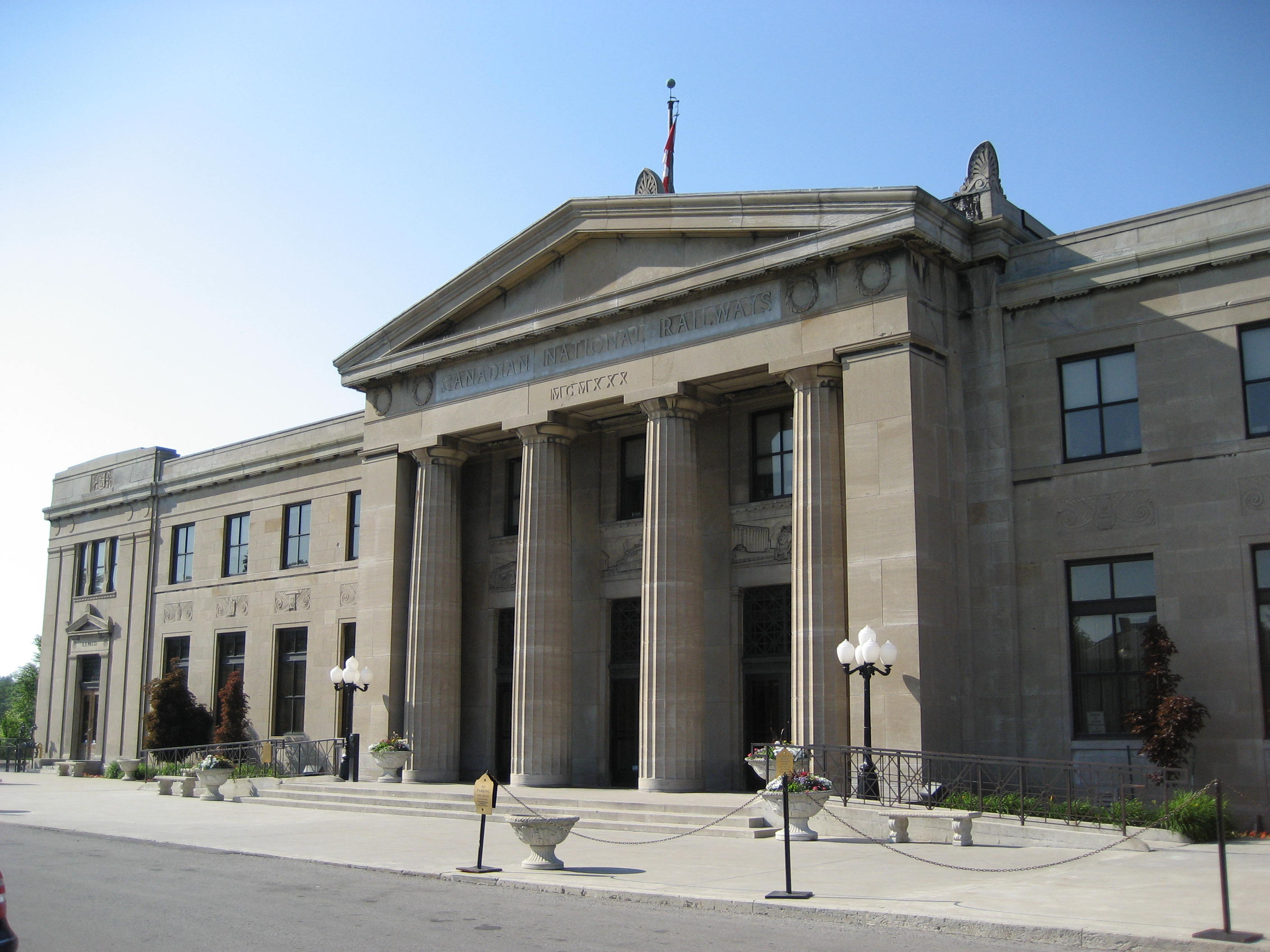
Former CNR station building

The neighbouring Hamilton Canadian National Railway Station, on the east side of James Street North at Murray Street, was built between 1929 and 1931.

The property is a National Historic Site and has been designated under the Federal Heritage Railway Stations Protection Act and under Part IV of the Ontario Heritage Act by City of Hamilton By-law 95-115. Portions of the building were protected by the Ontario Heritage Trust in 1999.

In 1967, GO Transit took over CN's commuter service between Toronto and Hamilton, and in 1978 all other CN passenger service was transferred to Via Rail.

In 1992 Via Rail closed its Burlington (formerly the GTR/CNR Freeman/Burlington Junction Station, built around 1910 and located near Brant Street), Hamilton and Dundas stations and consolidated service at the new Aldershot GO Station.

GO Transit closed the James Street station in 1993 and moved remaining service to the Hamilton GO Centre, one and a half kilometres directly south on James Street.

The Laborers' International Union of North America (LIUNA) bought and renovated the station, and in 2000 the station was reopened as LIUNA Station, an events centre with catering facilities for weddings, dances, and other special events.

=== GO Transit station ===
Plans for a new station on the CN line through Hamilton were announced on May 31, 2013, by Ontario's Minister of Transportation. Construction was estimated to cost $3 million and phase one was completed in time for the 2015 Pan American Games. Construction of phase two was proposed to begin in August 2015 after the games are over. Metrolinx announced on February 28, 2014, that Kenaidan Contracting Ltd. of Mississauga had been awarded a $44-million contract to build the station.

The station opened on July 9, 2015, and was initially served by two round trips per weekday, as well as special services related to the 2015 Pan-Am Games. In 2019, regular service was doubled to four round trips per day, of which one trip operated through to and from Niagara Falls.

Rail tracks west of Burlington GO Station are owned by CN Rail. This has added a greater degree of uncertainty to passenger rail expansion as all service changes need approval by CN who operate freight rail along the same corridor. Infrastructure upgrades completed in 2020 at the Hamilton Junction have relieved a bottleneck and allowed the introduction of all-day hourly passenger rail service to the station. On August 7, 2021, West Harbour station became the western terminus for all-day local services on the Lakeshore West line, when one train per hour was extended westward to West Harbour.

West Harbour GO Station's platforms were built on stub-ended tracks which were only connected in the Toronto-bound direction. Trains traveling between Hamilton and Niagara Falls had to reverse either in or out of the station, a manoeuvre that added 20 minutes to the schedule. In 2024, the stub tracks were extended to reconnect with the mainline east of the station in order to eliminate that manoeuvre. By April 2025, the new connection was in service to facilitate service to Niagara Falls station and to the future Confederation GO Station. Since May 17, 2025, all trains to or from Niagara Falls now stop at West Harbour GO Station.

== Service ==
Lakeshore West trains operate hourly from West Harbour to Oshawa GO Station via Union Station. Three trips per day also extend beyond Hamilton to St. Catharines and Niagara Falls. On weekdays during peak periods, three express trains service West Harbour, travelling non-stop between Clarkson and Union Station.

GO bus route 18K connects with select train arrivals, with service to Brock University via St. Catharines station. The station is also served by Hamilton Street Railway (HSR) bus routes 4 Bayfront and 20 A-Line Express on James Street North.

== Future ==
As part of the Province's GO Expansion program, the Lakeshore West corridor will be electrified between Union Station and Burlington allowing the operation of electric trains at frequencies of 15 minutes or better all day. Electrification beyond Burlington toward Hamilton is not planned and was excluded from the GO Expansion environmental assessment completed in 2017. Instead, diesel trains will continue to serve West Harbour at a peak period frequency of 30 minutes and the current 60 minute frequency off peak and weekends between Confederation GO Station and Union Station.

== See also ==
- Hamilton GO Centre
