= Confederation GO Station =

Commuter rail station in Hamilton, Ontario

Confederation
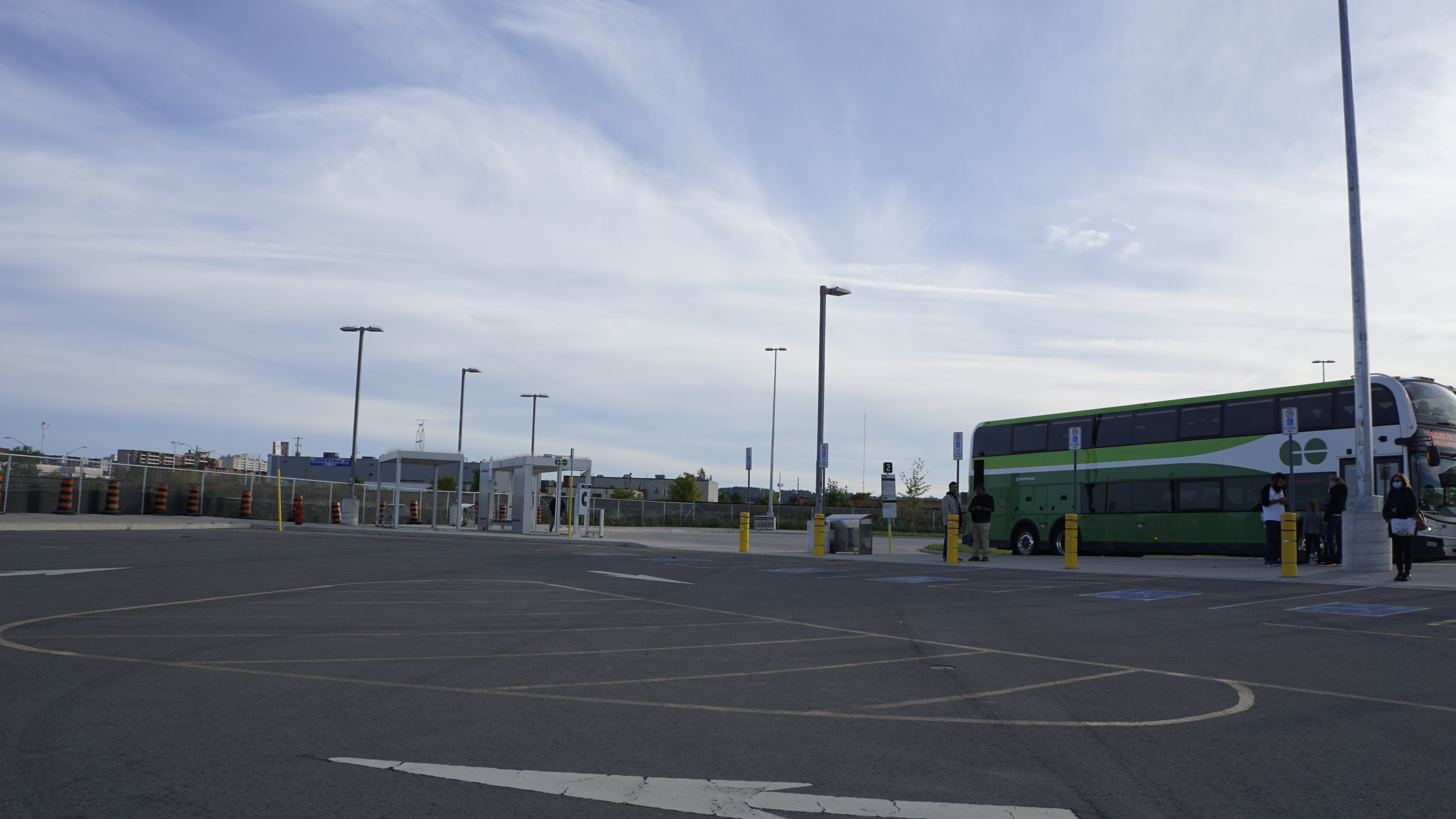

General information
- Location: 397 Centennial Parkway, Hamilton, Ontario
- Coordinates: 43°14′30″N 79°45′33″W
- Owner: Metrolinx
- Platforms: Island platform
- Tracks: 1 + 1 bypass
- Bus routes: 11 12
- Connections: Hamilton Street Railway

Construction
- Parking: 148
- Accessible: Yes

Other information
- Station code: GO Transit: CF
- Fare zone: 80

History
- Opened: October 27, 2025

Services
Preceding station	GO Transit	Following station
West Harbour towards Union	Lakeshore West	Terminus
West Harbour towards Union	Lakeshore West (peak express)	St. Catharines towards Niagara Falls
West Harbour towards Union	Lakeshore West (off-peak express)	St. Catharines towards Niagara Falls
Location

Confederation GO Station is a train station in East Hamilton, Ontario, Canada. The station is named for Confederation Beach Park, nearby on Lake Ontario.

The station was built as part of the expansion of GO Transit's Lakeshore West line service to Niagara Falls. Construction on the site began in 2017, however opening of the rail station was delayed several times. Bus service began at the station in November 2, 2019, and train service began on October 27, 2025.

== History ==
Beginning in 2014, CN Rail managed the replacement of the Centennial Parkway rail bridge, in partnership with the City of Hamilton and GO Transit. The 84-year-old concrete rail bridge (built 1901 and upgraded 1939) was demolished and a new one erected. This enhancement widened the road and added provisions for an extra track and platform for expected GO Transit service. The bridge work was completed in late 2016.

In February 2015, $150 million was the estimated cost to extend GO Train service the 10 kilometres beyond West Harbour GO Station to East Hamilton, near Stoney Creek. Development of the station site would cost $35 million, and the associated upgrades to the rail infrastructure $115 million. On May 26, 2015, the Government of Ontario announced that the station project was fully funded. Construction began in late 2017 and was originally expected to conclude in 2019.

GO Bus route 12 began serving the station's bus loop on November 2, 2019, when about 60 parking spaces were also made available. GO Transit bus 11 began using the station as well in 2021, along with local Hamilton Street Railway buses.

In April 2020, a public tender was issued for the rail-related work. The build contract was awarded in early 2022. Construction of the rail station resumed in October 2022 with an estimated completion date of 2025. The addition of a third track between West Harbour and Confederation GO which had been proposed since 2015 was dropped from the plan.

On September 29, 2025, the provincial government announced trains would begin serving the station on October 27, 2025, with the parking lot expanded to 148 spots. Initially the station was served by 13 Lakeshore West line trains on weekdays and 15 trains on weekends.

== Station ==
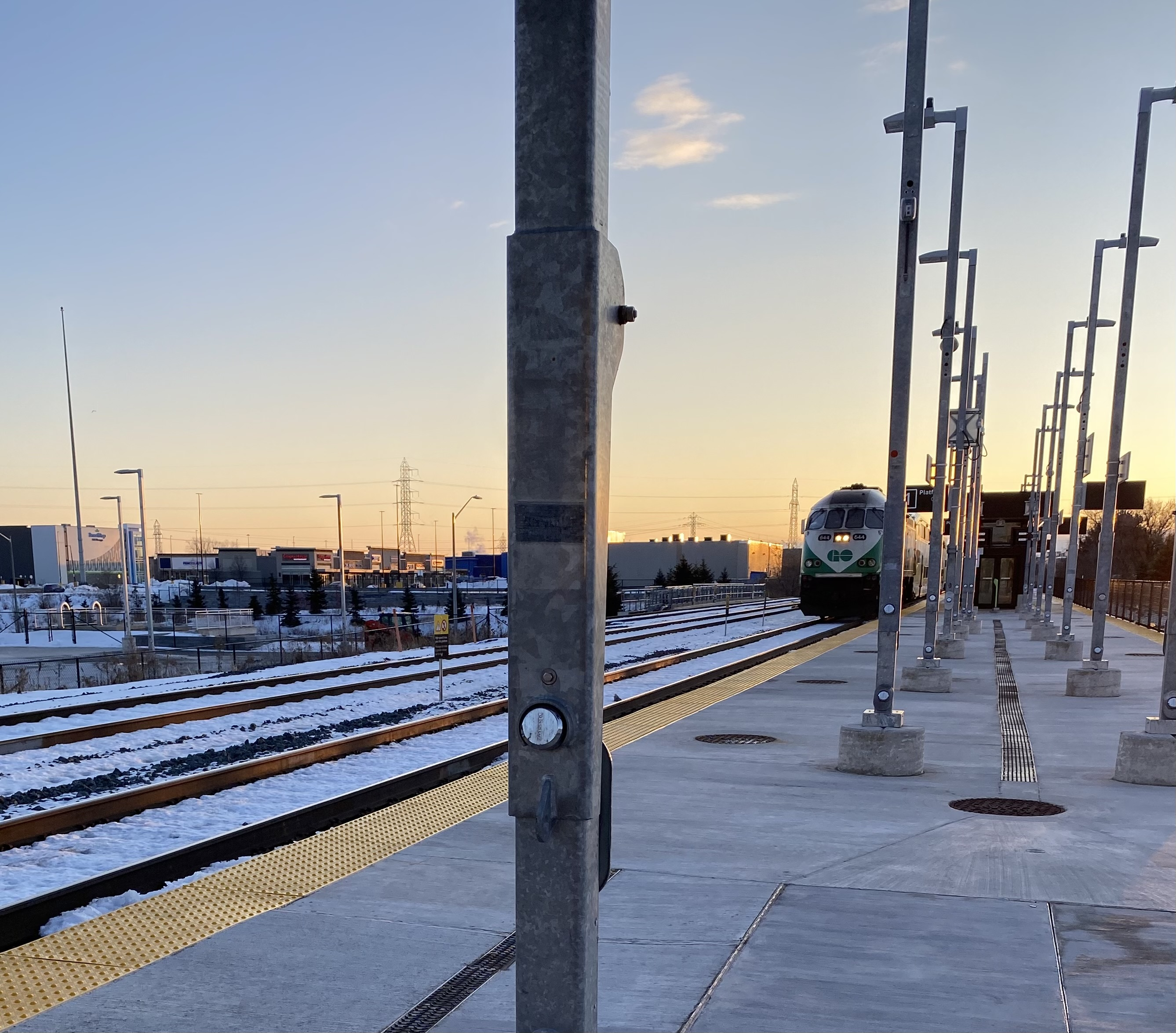
Eastbound GO train on the Lakeshore West line arriving at Platform 1.

The railway station has an island platform, although only the north side has a track. The platform has heated shelters and is accessible via a pedestrian tunnel. The station building includes a waiting area. The station area has bicycle racks, a 15-vehicle drop-off/pick-up area, 210 parking spaces and stair access to Centennial Parkway.

== Nearby landmarks ==
- Eastgate Square
- Confederation Plaza
- Confederation Beach Park
- Wild Waterworks
