= SmartTrack =

Proposal to enhance passenger rail in Toronto, Ontario

Overview
- Status: Proposed
- Owner: Metrolinx
- Locale: Toronto, Ontario

Service
- Type: Commuter rail / rapid transit

SmartTrack is a municipal proposal to enhance GO Transit rail service within Toronto, Ontario, Canada. It takes advantage of the province's existing GO Expansion plans. SmartTrack has evolved since it was originally proposed by Toronto mayor John Tory as the centrepiece of his 2014 mayoral election campaign.

Originally, SmartTrack was to be a new rapid transit service with 22 stations (of which 14 would be new) along the inner portions of the Kitchener, Lakeshore East and Stouffville GO commuter train corridors. In 2021, the project evolved into the SmartTrack Stations Program – a proposal to construct five new GO stations along the existing Kitchener, Lakeshore East, Stouffville and Barrie services. As of October 2025, two of the five stations are under construction.

== Proposals ==
=== Original (2014) ===
SmartTrack was first proposed during John Tory's 2014 campaign for mayor. It had been changed with proposals made by city staff after Tory assumed office.

The SmartTrack line as originally proposed would be 53 kilometres (33 mi) long and run along Eglinton Avenue from Matheson/Airport Corporate Centre in Mississauga to Mount Dennis before turning downtown to Union Station. It would then run northeast through Scarborough to Unionville in Markham. In total, 22 stations and interchanges with the Union Pearson Express, Line 1 Yonge–University, Line 2 Bloor–Danforth, Line 5 Eglinton, and GO Transit were proposed. Tory estimated ridership would be 200,000 passengers a day, would cost $8 billion and be in service by 2021. No costing or ridership studies had been undertaken by Metrolinx, the TTC or the City of Toronto.

On December 5 the executive committee voted unanimously to commence feasibility studies regarding the project with Toronto City Council to vote on it in January. On February 10, 2015, the Toronto City Council voted to spend $1.65 million more to study SmartTrack.

SmartTrack is the latest in a series of proposed solutions to provide relief for the overcrowded Yonge–University line, particularly at the Bloor–Yonge station transfer point with the Bloor–Danforth line. As proposed, it would service the shoulder areas of downtown such as Liberty Village, CityPlace, and the proposed East Don Lands development. It would also connect Toronto to major employment centres in Mississauga and Markham. It would run above ground north along Eglinton using the Richview Expressway right of way and along the Kitchener line, Lakeshore East line, and Stouffville line. By building above ground and using existing infrastructure Tory stated that SmartTrack would be built far faster than the Downtown Relief Line (since replaced by the Ontario Line), in 7 years opposed to 17.

SmartTrack would complement the Government of Ontario's plan to electrify the entire GO Transit network over the next 10 years to provide regional express rail (RER) to the Greater Toronto and Hamilton Area. Using electric multiple units SmartTrack would provide all day service throughout Toronto approximately every 15 minutes. Tory claims that at Kennedy station a rider would get to Union Station in less than 30 minutes using SmartTrack’s service instead of 40 minutes along TTC's Line 2 and Line 1 subways.

SmartTrack is also the latest proposal to bring rapid transit along Eglinton West to Pearson International Airport after the Eglinton West Subway was cancelled. By connecting to the Eglinton line at Mount Dennis there would be rapid transportation along Eglinton from Pearson International Airport to Kennedy Road.

Tory estimated the cost of SmartTrack to be $8 billion, although no detailed studies were undertaken. As proposed by Tory, Toronto's share would be paid for by using tax increment financing. It was expected that the provincial and federal government would each contribute a third of the cost. Mississauga and Markham would also pay their 1/3 share for their portions of the SmartTrack Line, although they made no commitments.

SmartTrack would likely lead to an overhaul of TTC bus routes. Residents of Etobicoke and Scarborough would take an express bus to their closest SmartTrack station instead of the distant terminuses of Line 1 and 2. By diverting these passengers SmartTrack would also benefit North York commuters on the current overcapacity feeder bus routes to the Line 1 subway.

=== Scope reduction (2016–2021) ===
By January 2016, City and Metrolinx staff developed a draft proposal to integrate SmartTrack with expanded GO Transit rail service that would make SmartTrack smaller, cheaper and possibly more frequent. The proposal would add $2 billion to $3.5 billion to existing GO expansion plans.

Under the staff proposal, SmartTrack would be shortened to run from Mount Dennis in the west to Kennedy station in the east and have only four or five new stations. Staff would replace SmartTrack's western branch along Eglinton Avenue West to Pearson Airport by an expansion of the Eglinton Crosstown LRT. There would be 6–17 LRT stops instead of three SmartTrack stops. SmartTrack's eastern branch from Kennedy Station to Markham would be deferred indefinitely.

SmartTrack was to run trains every 15 minutes. However, ridership modelling showed that such a frequency would not attract a sufficient number of passengers. Thus, staff are looking at frequencies of at least every 10 minutes, and as high as every five minutes during peak periods in some areas – almost as frequent as a subway.

A city staff report presented to Toronto's executive council in March 2016 says that in order to accommodate a “separate and parallel” SmartTrack service, as Tory had promised, would require two additional tracks along the entire length of the existing GO corridor necessitating the demolition of many houses and residential highrise buildings. Also, two new platforms would be required at Union Station. This would not be possible to implement within seven years and for $8 billion. Instead of the 22 new stops promised by Tory, staff are proposing only four to eight additional stops. As of March 2016, the issues of fare, frequency of trains and total cost are unresolved.

By June 2016, City planning staff were recommending seven new stations for SmartTrack service in addition to combined SmartTrack/GO RER service at Union Station, one future GO station (Mount Dennis) plus six existing GO stations. The six new SmartTrack stations would be St. Clair–Old Weston, King–Liberty (Liberty Village at King Street), East Harbour (Unilever site), Gerrard–Carlaw, Lawrence–Kennedy, and Finch–Kennedy. A proposed SmartTrack station near Ellesmere SRT station was cancelled. Another proposed station at Spadina–Front between Liberty Village and Union Station was considered but was rejected as it would not fit with the track density at that location. Staff had estimated that SmartTrack would put 24,100 residents and 19,000 jobs within 500 metres of a station, and would carry 27,600 riders daily in addition to GO Regional Express Rail, and would divert 3,900 riders from the Yonge subway south of Bloor Street during the morning rush hours.

Metrolinx estimated that the six new SmartTrack stations would cost $1.25 billion, of which the City would pay $835 million, with the federal government paying the balance. Approvals for the financing were still to be secured as of November 3, 2016. Separately, the province was to spend $3.7 billion on GO Regional Express Rail which is a prerequisite for SmartTrack. Completion is expected by 2026.

In September 2018, the Ontario Ministry of the Environment approved the environmental assessment for the six new SmartTrack stations.

By January 2021, the number of new SmartTrack stations had been further reduced from six to four. The proposed Gerrard–Carlaw and Lawrence–Kennedy stations were dropped due to their proximity to new proposed subway lines, respectively the Ontario Line and the Scarborough subway extension. The four new stations remaining under consideration were St. Clair–Old Weston, King–Liberty (Liberty Village at King Street), East Harbour, and Finch–Kennedy.

=== Five-station proposal (2021–2024) ===
On August 17, 2021, the province and the City of Toronto signed an agreement in principle to build five "SmartTrack" stations under the new SmartTrack Stations Program. One station, Bloor–Lansdowne, is classified as a SmartTrack station even though it is located on the Barrie line and not on the originally conceived SmartTrack corridor. The new stations will be jointly funded by the City of Toronto, the Province of Ontario and the federal government. At the time, all five stations were expected to open by 2026.

The SmartTrack stations are in addition to four other proposed new GO stations (Park Lawn, Spadina–Front, Woodbine and Caledonia) that are not part of SmartTrack. Another original SmartTrack station, Mount Dennis, opened on November 16, 2025.

As of March 2023, the costs to deliver the five SmartTrack stations was confirmed by city staff to have increased to $1.697 billion, an increase of $234 million from the original $1.463-billion budget, due to supply chain pressures and increases in contractor bids from initial cost estimates. City staff requested the city council seek the province’s financial commitment to cover the cost increases. City staff also provided a program update which advised that the entirety of the SmartTrack program will enter revenue service by March 2029.

On June 14, 2023, the deputy mayor advised the council that negotiations led to the province providing a funding subsidy such that the revised program budget was now $1.689 billion, with $878 million from the City of Toronto, $585 million from the Government of Canada, and $226 million from the Province of Ontario. The difference in program budgets between March and June 2023 is due to a reduction in the project contingency amount. The city's financial contribution is being provided through the city's building fund, tax increment financing and development charges. The province's financial commitment was conditional upon a number of terms, some of which stated that the original program budget must be fully utilized before tapping into the province's funding and that the city and province will manage the revised program budget by implementing cost mitigation measures as required (e.g. value engineering, reductions in scope, along with station-specific and program contingencies) to keep the SmartTrack Program on time and on budget. The respective in-service dates for the five stations are as follows:

Station	GO line	Construction start date	Targeted in-service start date
St. Clair–Old Weston	Kitchener	January 2024	March 2029
Bloor–Lansdowne	Barrie	February 2024	November 2027
King–Liberty	Kitchener	January 2024	March 2028
East Harbour	Lakeshore East; Stouffville	March 2023	August 2028
Finch–Kennedy	Stouffville	October 2023	August 2027

=== Three-station proposal (since 2024) ===
In December 2024, city staff presented an update to city council regarding Metrolinx's communication of cost pressures and, as such, an inability to deliver the five-station proposal within the allotted program budget ($1.689 billion). In the letter from the Ontario minister of transportation to the mayor of Toronto, cost pressures included escalating prices for materials and labour. The province offered limited additional funding support, contingent on increased funding from federal and municipal partners. City staff did not recommend increasing the program budget but instead recommended prioritizing three stations: East Harbour, Bloor–Lansdowne (later renamed Junction Triangle), and St. Clair–Old Weston (later renamed Stockyards).

East Harbour provides significant transit connectivity between Lakeshore East GO, Stouffville GO, Ontario Line, and future streetcar service; Junction Triangle would suffer financial penalties for contract cancellation; and Stockyards (now planned as a Union Pearson Express station) ties into the City's St. Clair Transportation Master Plan. With respect to Finch–Kennedy and King–Liberty, city staff recommend the province fund these two stations as they provide more benefits to provincial initiatives, given Metrolinx will ultimately own, operate and maintain the SmartTrack Stations Program. Following this update, the revised respective in-service dates for the five stations are below. The program completion date would now be delayed from March 2029 to December 2031.

Station	GO line	Construction start date	Targeted in-service start date	Note
Stockyards	Union Pearson Express	2026	2031	Recommended
Junction Triangle	Barrie	2025	2027	Recommended
King–Liberty	Kitchener	TBD	TBD	Deferred
East Harbour	Lakeshore East; Stouffville	2025	2028	Recommended
Finch–Kennedy	Stouffville	TBD	TBD	Deferred

== Anticipated economic benefits ==
There has been an ongoing discussion as to economic benefits of Toronto's different rapid transit choices. According to Tess Kalinowski, writing in the Toronto Star, a study co-authored by Andre Sorensen, a University of Toronto professor of Human Geography, SmartTrack's route would average 12 hectares per kilometre available for redevelopment. This was slightly more than the 11.1 hectares per kilometre available if the TTC's heavy rail system were extended from Kennedy station to Sheppard Avenue.

== Outstanding issues and criticism ==
As of October 2017, proposed layouts for each new SmartTrack station were available for public review. However, the following issues remained outstanding:

- The projected ridership is not yet known.
- The passenger fare for SmartTrack has yet to be determined and may depend on the outcome of a Metrolinx study on regional fare integration.
- The train frequency is not yet finalized. The hoped-for frequency is 6–10 minutes in rush hours and 15 minutes in the off-hours.
- It is uncertain whether there would be direct trains between the east and west ends of the SmartTrack route, or a change of train at Union Station. A change of trains might reduce ridership.

A controversial part of Tory’s SmartTrack proposal during the election campaign was the Eglinton spur, from Mount Dennis to the Airport Corporate Centre in Mississauga. During the election campaign, Tory promised it would not require tunnelling, then acknowledged under pressure that it might. (Tory and his campaign staff had planned to use the former Richview Expressway corridor to run commuter trains westwards from Mount Dennis. However, that land was no longer available having been sold off for private development. Also the Tory team underestimated the technical difficulties of the large turning circle that heavy rail vehicles would require at Mount Dennis. This forced the need for much more expensive tunnel and elevated sections.) City Manager Pennachetti said the city would study the “technical feasibility, community impacts, and cost implications of a heavy rail line” on the Eglinton spur, including the “feasibility of any required tunnels and bridges.” According to a joint report from city planners and the University of Toronto Transportation Research Institute released in January 2016, heavy rail would draw about 87,000 daily boardings at a cost up to $7.7 billion while LRT would draw more than 105,000 daily transit boardings at a cost of about $1.3 billion. On January 19, 2016, Mayor John Tory conceded that heavy rail was not the best option for the branch from Mount Dennis to the airport.

The eastern sections of SmartTrack will run on the tracks of the Stouffville GO line, and would therefore be within two kilometres of the proposed extension of the Line 2 Bloor–Danforth subway into Scarborough. There was concern that SmartTrack trains would cannibalize the subway's ridership. A report, titled Choices for Scarborough, Transit, Walking and Intensification in Toronto’s Inner Suburbs written by University of Toronto professors Andre Sorensen and Paul Hess, states that the worst-case scenario would be to build the Scarborough subway extension on the city’s approved route along McCowan Road within two kilometres of SmartTrack. By October 2015, TTC CEO Andy Byford also expressed concern that two lines may cannibalize each other’s riders. On January 20, 2016, City Staff issued a proposal to eliminate two of the three stops on the planned Scarborough subway extension and to terminate Line 2 Bloor–Danforth at Scarborough Town Centre with no intermediate stops from Kennedy station. Critics claim this revised plan would prevent the subway from cannibalizing ridership from SmartTrack's branch to Markham.

Critics described Tory's pledge to pay the city’s portion of SmartTrack costs solely through tax increment financing as overly risky prompting the city and provincial officials to study the financial risks. In October 2015, a city staff report said TIFs “may be an appropriate revenue tool,” but there is a risk new development won’t happen as expected, and that directly attributing any new development to the transit line may be a challenge. Globe & Mail columnist Marcus Gee cited an example of TIF risk for transit projects: as of 2012, TIF has not been successful in New York City to help pay for a $2.4-billion extension of the 7 subway line, as TIF revenue from new development had fallen more than $100 million short of the $283 million expected. In October 2016, a City report said that TIF would be insufficient to fund the City's portion of SmartTrack implementation costs. The report said that to "fund the early shortfalls", a 2.1% property tax increase would also be required until 2026.

During the 2014 mayoral election, John Tory's election team predicted SmartTrack would carry 200,000 passengers per day with trains operating at a 15-minute frequency with a TTC fare being charged. According to University of Toronto academics, if the service runs every five minutes and uses TTC fares, SmartTrack could carry up to 300,000 people per day. However at a frequency of every 15 minutes (as proposed by John Tory), ridership would fall to about 75,000 people per day with a TTC fare, or half that with a GO fare.

In October 2015, the mayor's office issued a statement believing a staff report confirms "that SmartTrack will provide real relief on the Yonge subway line with 75 existing TTC bus and streetcar routes connecting into the SmartTrack line.” However, transit blogger Steve Munro countered that the study does not confirm that SmartTrack would relieve crowding on the Yonge-University line as ridership projections were still unavailable to form such a conclusion.

In an October 6, 2015, letter to Toronto's city manager, Metrolinx CEO Bruce McCuaig wrote "Metrolinx and the province believe that the (city report) should reflect the scenario where SmartTrack is an incremental increase in RER (regional express rail) service, rather than an independent and parallel service that co-exists with RER." The letter also says SmartTrack cannot operate as a "surface subway" as federal rail regulations would prohibit TTC-style subway trains from operating on GO's mainline-rail tracks. The letter also warns that SmartTrack could entail "considerable" expense over and above the GO plans for RER, "depending on the service concept and design."

During the 2014 election, John Tory said that SmartTrack could be completed within 7 years. An October 2016 city report suggests that SmartTrack would not be completed until 2024 or 2026, depending on various interpretations.

By late 2017, approval of the new Lawrence East SmartTrack station was in doubt pending a cost/benefit review by the provincial auditor general. There was a concern of political pressure in the decision for this station. There was also the issue of whether the right of way is wide enough to permit construction of the SmartTrack station without shutting down Line 3 Scarborough which also has a station at that location. In January 2021, the Lawrence–Kennedy station was dropped because its proximity to the proposed Scarborough subway extension.

Given that the number of proposed new SmartTrack stations had been reduced from 22 to 4 by January 2021, city councillor Gord Perks suggested that SmartTrack be abandoned and that the $1.46 billion the City had budgeted for SmartTrack be allocated to improving TTC services.

== SmartTrack stations ==
The following table lists SmartTrack stations, both currently proposed and cancelled, along the Kitchener, Lakeshore East and Stouffville GO Transit rail corridors. It excludes Bloor–Lansdowne station on the Barrie corridor as it was not originally conceived as a SmartTrack station.

Stop	Details	Transit connections	Comments
Matheson/Airport Corporate Centre		MiWay 7 Airport, 43 Matheson–Argentia and 107 Malton Express bus routes	This section was cancelled and is to be replaced by a westerly extension of Line 5 Eglinton
Kipling		TTC 45 Kipling and 32 Eglinton West bus routes	This section was cancelled and is to be replaced by a westerly extension of Line 5 Eglinton
Scarlett or Jane		TTC 35 Jane, 73 Royal York, 32 Eglinton West bus routes	This section was cancelled and is to be replaced by a westerly extension of Line 5 Eglinton
Mount Dennis		Kitchener line; Union Pearson Express; Line 5 Eglinton	GO Train and UP Express opened in November 16, 2025; Line 5 Eglinton opened in February 8, 2026
St. Clair West (Stockyards)	Approx. 4 kilometres (2.5 mi) west of St. Clair West subway station, between Keele St. / Weston Rd. and Old Weston Rd.	512 St. Clair streetcar route	Redesigned to be a UP Express station instead of a SmartTrack station.
Dundas West (Bloor GO Station)		Kitchener line; Union Pearson Express; Line 2 Bloor–Danforth; 504 King and 505 Dundas streetcar routes	
Liberty Village (King–Liberty GO Station)	Liberty Village at King Street	504 King streetcar route	New proposed SmartTrack station
Spadina (Spadina–Front GO Station)		510 Spadina streetcar route	Not recommended by city staff
Union (Union Station)		Line 1 Yonge–University; GO Transit; Via Rail; Union Pearson Express; 509 Harbourfront and 510 Spadina streetcar routes	
Unilever Site (East Harbour Transit Hub)	Unilever site south of Eastern Avenue sold by Unilever Canada to First Gulf Corporation	Connection to proposed Ontario Line	Proposed station for GO Transit trains and Ontario Line
Queen		501 Queen streetcar route	Not recommended by city staff
Gerrard (Gerrard–Carlaw GO Station)	At Gerrard Street and Carlaw Avenue	506 Carlton streetcar route	Proposed SmartTrack station cancelled due to proximity to Ontario Line
Main Street (Danforth GO Station)		Line 2 Bloor–Danforth; Lakeshore East line; 506 Carlton	
Scarborough (Scarborough GO Station)		Lakeshore East line	
Kennedy		Line 2 Bloor–Danforth; Line 5 Eglinton; Stouffville line	
Lawrence East (Lawrence–Kennedy GO Station)	Beside Lawrence East station	TTC 54 Lawrence East bus route	Proposed SmartTrack station cancelled due to proximity to the Line 2 Scarborough extension
Ellesmere	Beside Ellesmere station	TTC 95 York Mills bus route	Proposed SmartTrack station cancelled
Agincourt (Agincourt GO Station)	Northside of Sheppard Avenue East west of Agincourt Drive	Stouffville line	
Finch (Finch–Kennedy GO Station)	Between Midland Avenue and Milliken Boulevard	TTC 39 Finch East bus	New proposed SmartTrack station
Milliken (Milliken GO Station)	Side of Steeles Avenue East with access via Redlea Avenue	Stouffville line	
14th Avenue	West of Kennedy Road	York Region Transit 2 Milliken bus route	Not recommended by city staff
Unionville (Unionville GO Station)	At YMCA Boulevard west of Kennedy Road (Downtown Markham)	Stouffville line	To be an RER station but not a SmartTrack station
