= Gerrard–Carlaw GO Station =

Formerly proposed railway station in Toronto

Gerrard–Carlaw

General information
- Location: Gerrard Street and Carlaw Avenue; Toronto, Ontario
- Coordinates: 43°40′4.8″N 79°20′31.2″W
- Owner: Metrolinx
- Platforms: Side platforms
- Tracks: 2

Construction
- Parking: No
- Accessible: Yes

Other information
- Status: Cancelled

Services
Preceding station	GO Transit	Following station
East Harbour towards Union	Lakeshore East Planned expansion	Danforth towards Oshawa
East Harbour towards Union	Stouffville Planned expansion	Kennedy towards Old Elm
Location

Gerrard–Carlaw GO Station (also known as Gerrard GO Station) was a planned GO Transit train station to be built by Metrolinx over Gerrard Street and Carlaw Avenue in Toronto. It was initially proposed as part of SmartTrack but was removed from the plan in January 2021.

== History ==
The station was originally proposed in 2014 as part of Mayor John Tory's SmartTrack plan.

On September 22, 2015, Metrolinx proposed it as the location of a new GO station alongside the other proposed SmartTrack stations.

On June 21, 2016, the city of Toronto and the province of Ontario jointly announced that they were both moving forward with plans to construct Gerrard–Carlaw GO Station, along with five other proposed SmartTrack stations. It was then confirmed to be part of the Regional Express Rail (RER) expansion program on June 28, 2016. The station would also be included in Metrolinx's Stouffville line GO expansion project, which broke ground in the same year, then slated for completion in 2025. On February 27, 2018, Metrolinx CEO Phil Verster announced that the station, along with 11 others, were being recommended for a full business case for the RER expansion program by the end of the year. A preliminary business case had determined that the 12 stations would generate a combined total of $6.71 billion in benefits over 60 years. However, by January 2021, the station was officially dropped from the SmartTrack program, in the wake of the announcement of the Ontario Line on April 10, 2019. The Ontario Line's Gerrard station is now under construction at the location of Gerrard–Carlaw GO Station, rendering it redundant.
