= Regional Express =

Regional Express may refer to:

- Regional-Express, a train class in Austria, Germany & Luxembourg
- Rex Airlines, formerly Regional Express Airlines, an airline in Australia
- GO Transit Regional Express Rail, an ongoing transit improvement project in Greater Toronto
- Transport express régional, a train category and brand name in France
