= Mulock GO Station =

Proposed train station in Newmarket, Ontario

Mulock

General information
- Location: Mulock Drive; Newmarket, Ontario
- Coordinates: 44°2′22″N 79°27′29″W (expected)
- Owner: Metrolinx
- Platforms: Side platforms
- Tracks: 2
- Connections: York Region Transit

Construction
- Parking: 550
- Accessible: Yes

Services
Preceding station	GO Transit	Following station
Newmarket towards Allandale Waterfront	Barrie Planned expansion	Aurora towards Union
Location

Mulock GO Station is a planned GO Transit train station to be built by Metrolinx in Newmarket, Ontario as a part of the approved GO Expansion program. It will be built on Mulock Drive, between Yonge Street and Bayview Avenue. The station is to have approximately 550 parking spaces. A kiss and ride and a bus loop will also be provided at the station. Metrolinx expects the daily ridership at the station to be 3,891 in 2031.

The station was originally proposed in 2015, as part of a larger list of potential future station sites. On June 24, 2016, Minister of Transportation Steven Del Duca announced that three new stations on the Barrie line corridor would be added as part of the RER plan: Kirby station in Vaughan, Mulock station in Newmarket, and Innisfil station in Innisfil. Metrolinx later approved the plan for the new stations on June 28, 2016.

The Town of Newmarket also plans to create the Mulock Station Area Secondary Plan, a plan to provide development to the area around the future station. The Secondary Plan will provide places of residence, places of work, convenient connections to transportation, social services, and parks and outdoor areas in an approximate 79 hectares (200 acres) of area around the station site, with an estimated cost of C$240,000.
