= Bloor station =

Bloor station may refer to

- Bloor GO Station, a GO Transit railway station
- Bloor–Yonge station, a Toronto Transit Commission subway station
