= King–Liberty =

King–Liberty may mean:

- King–Liberty GO Station
- Liberty Village, a neighborhood of Toronto, Ontario, Canada
