= Dundas West station =

Toronto subway station

Dundas West
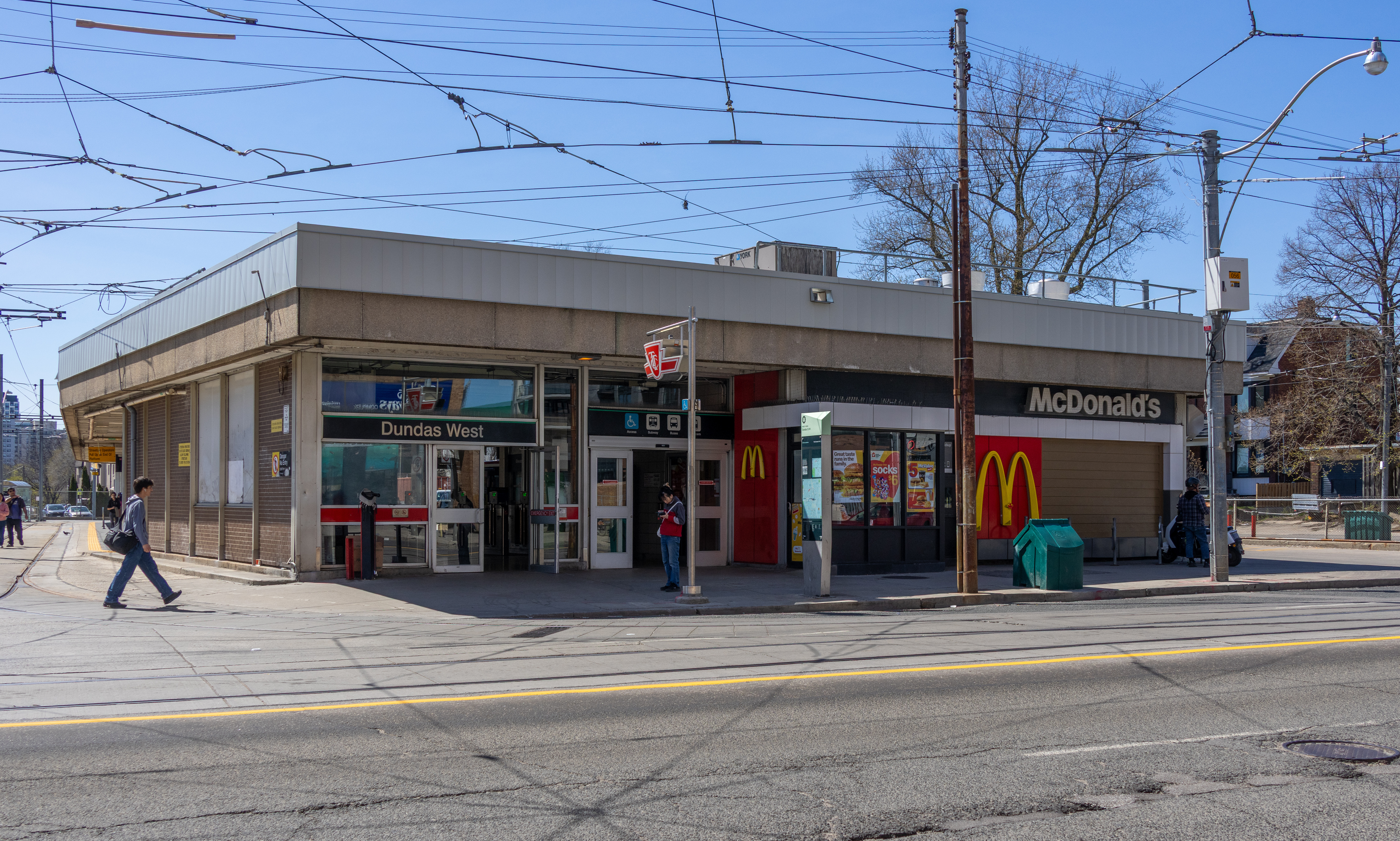

General information
- Location: 2365 Dundas Street West; Toronto, Ontario; Canada
- Coordinates: 43°39′25″N 79°27′11″W
- Platforms: Side platforms
- Tracks: 2
- Connections: TTC buses and Streetcars: 40 Junction–Dundas West; 168 Symington; 402 Parkdale Community Bus; 504A King; 505 Dundas; 300 Bloor-Danforth; 304 King; 305 Dundas; 340 Junction; Bloor GO

Construction
- Structure type: Underground
- Accessible: Yes

Other information
- Website: Official station page

History
- Opened: 26 February 1966; 60 years ago
- Rebuilt: 2002; 24 years ago (streetcar infrastructure)

Passengers
- 2023–2024: 23,861
- Rank: 25 of 70

Services
Preceding station	Toronto Transit Commission	Following station
Keele towards Kipling	Line 2 Bloor–Danforth	Lansdowne towards Kennedy
Terminus	504A King	Roncesvalles Avenue towards Distillery Loop
Terminus	505 Dundas	Roncesvalles Avenue towards Broadview
Location

Dundas West is a subway station on Line 2 Bloor–Danforth of the Toronto subway in Toronto, Ontario, Canada. It is located just north of Bloor Street West at the corner of Dundas Street and Edna Avenue. The station is about 200 metres west of Bloor GO Station on the GO Transit Kitchener line and the Union Pearson Express.

The station, which is the northwestern terminus of the 504A King and 505 Dundas streetcar routes, has two streetcar platforms and five bus bays to allow riders to transfer between connecting routes. Wi-Fi service is available at this station. A McDonald's restaurant serves the station, with access from both the fare-paid and non-fare-paid areas of the station's upper level, and there is a Gateway Newstand on the mezzanine level.

== Overview ==
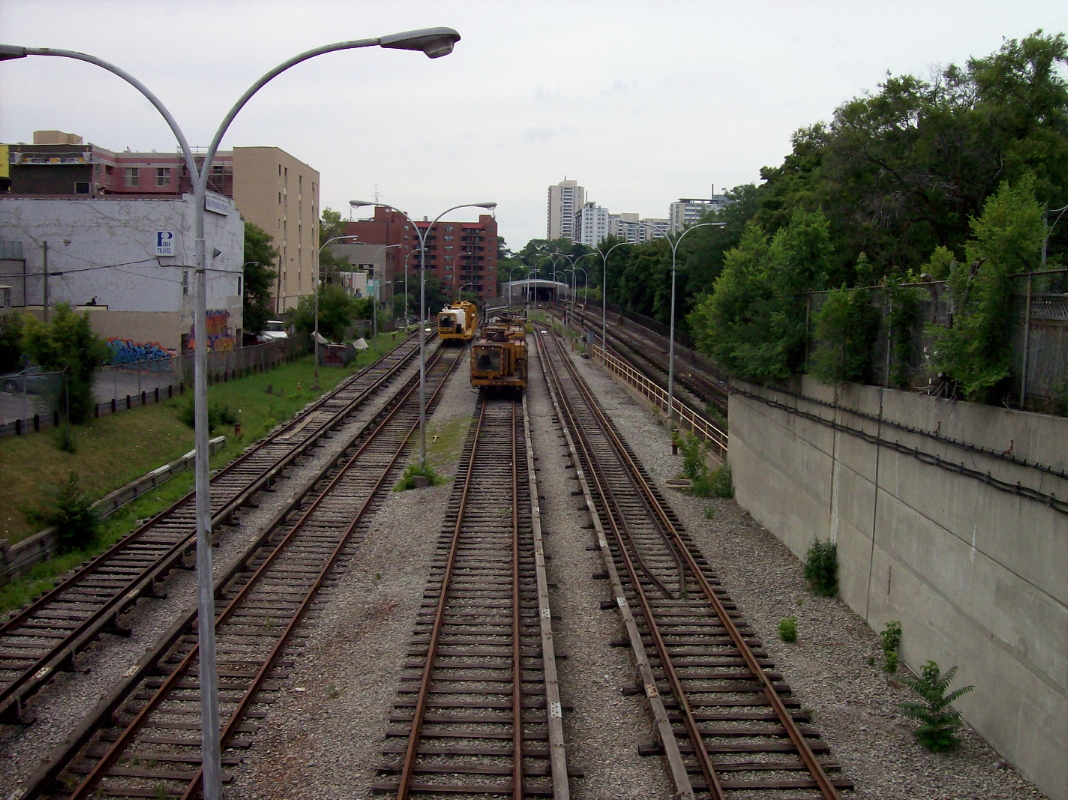
Looking westwards over Vincent Yard towards the elevated Keele station

To the east of the station, the subway runs in a twin-bored tunnel until just before the next station (Lansdowne). This allowed the tracks to pass underneath nearby railway lines without disturbing them during construction. To the west, the tracks follow a short "cut and cover" tunnel before emerging outside at the Dorval Portal. Trains run in the open air until they enter Keele Station.

The four tunnels comprising the Vincent Subway Yard are underground and south of the subway platforms. This station also houses the Subway Track Maintenance Office, which is located on the Mezzanine level.

Nearby landmarks include the Crossways residential and retail complex, Bishop Marrocco/Thomas Merton Catholic Secondary School, The Lithuanian House banquet hall, Roncesvalles and the Junction neighbourhoods.

== History ==
Dundas West station opened in 1966 as a part of the initial segment of the Bloor–Danforth line between Keele and Woodbine. Trolley buses on route 40 Junction served the station from 1968 to 1991.

In 2002, as part of a scheduled reconstruction of the streetcar tracks on Dundas Street, a second streetcar track and platform were added to improve reliability on both the 504 King and 505 Dundas streetcar routes. Until the completion of the second track, a streetcar waiting in the station on either route could hold up vehicles on the other. At the same time, elevators were added, making the station wheelchair-accessible.

Following controversy over the eponym of Dundas Street – British politician Henry Dundas, 1st Viscount Melville, who delayed the abolition of the transatlantic slave trade – Toronto City Council voted in 2021 to rename Dundas Street and other civic assets named after Dundas, such as Dundas West station. A new name was to be chosen in April 2022. In December 2023, citing costs, Toronto ultimately decided to keep Dundas' name for the street but to rename Yonge–Dundas Square (now Sankofa Square) and the two subway stations named after him, Dundas and Dundas West. Dundas station was renamed TMU station in December 2025, although as of January 2026, Dundas West has retained its name.

In April 2022, the streetcar loop was closed for two months to replace track and to extend the 505 streetcar platform to accommodate two Flexity Outlook streetcars.

== Surface connections ==
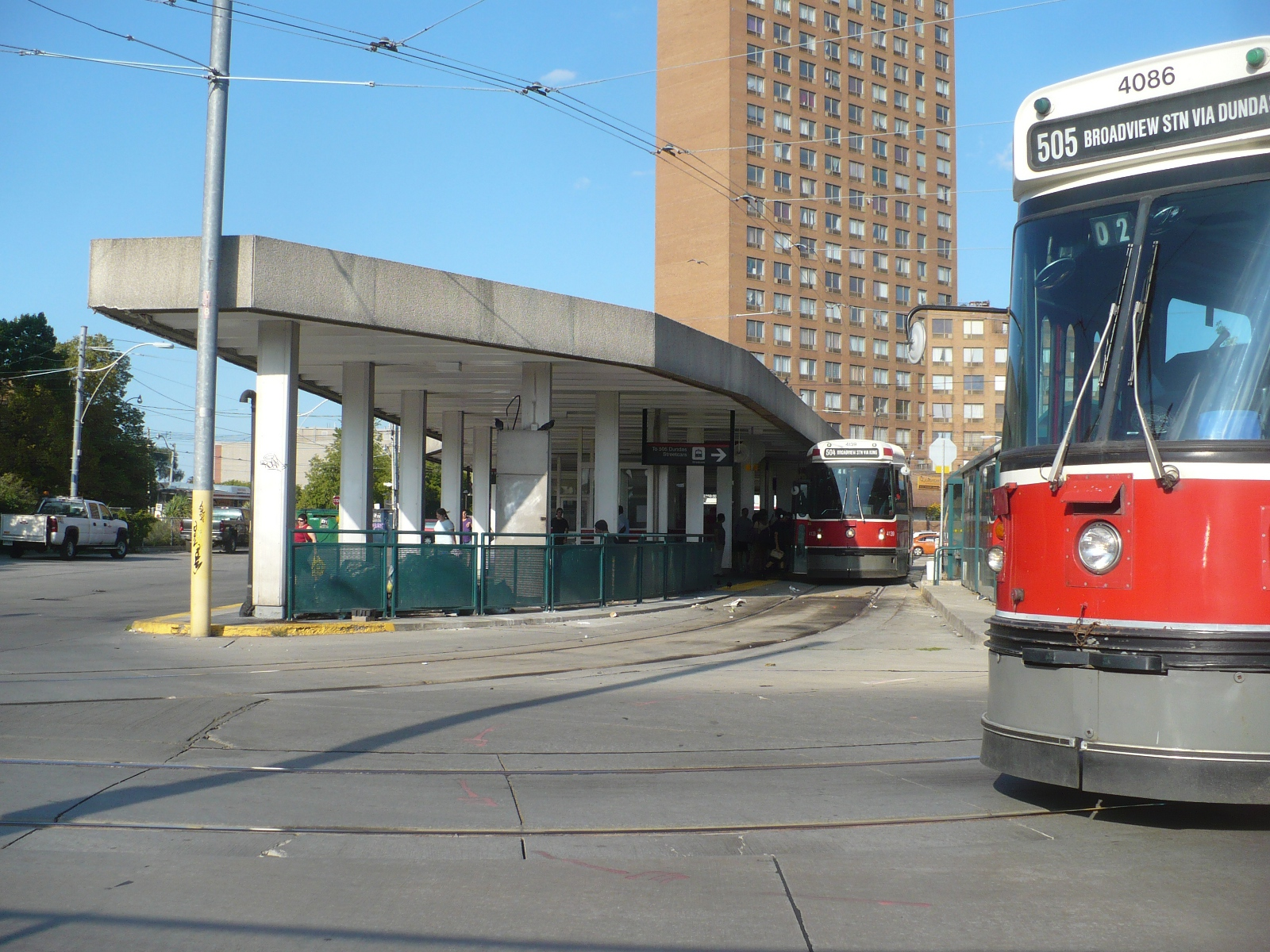
Streetcar and bus platforms

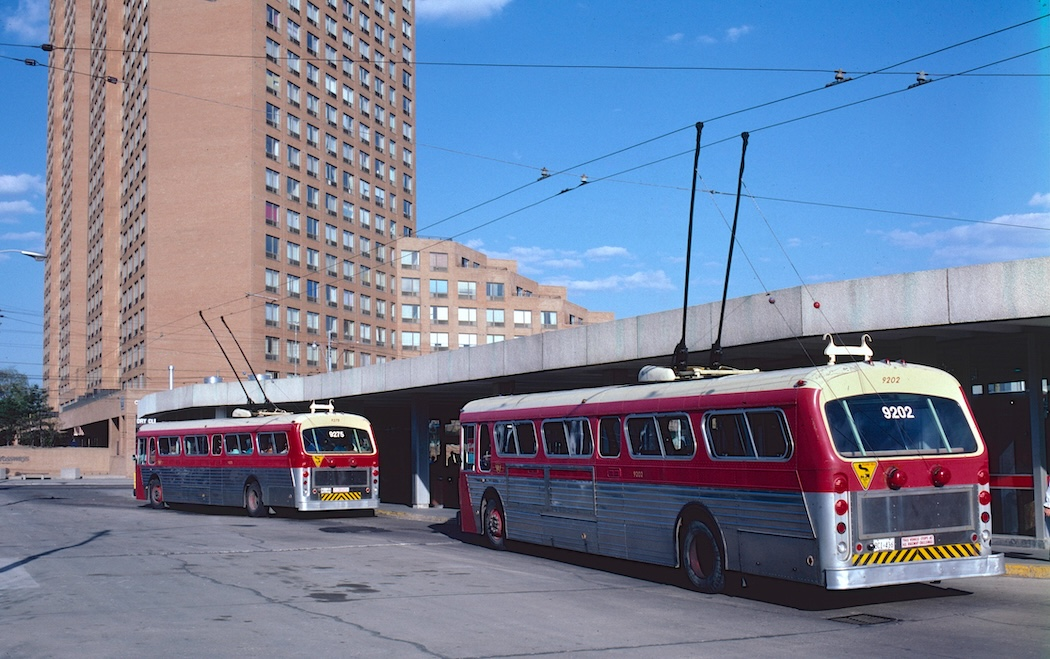
Two route 40 trolley buses of the former TTC trolley bus system at the Dundas West station in 1987

TTC routes serving the station include:

Route	Name	Additional information
40A	Junction–Dundas West	Westbound to Kipling station
40B	Junction–Dundas West	Westbound to Jane Street
168	Symington	Northbound to Mount Dennis station
304	King	Blue Night Network; eastbound to Broadview station
305	Dundas	Blue Night Network; eastbound to Broadview station
340	Junction	Eastbound to Gunns Loop
402	Parkdale	Community bus
504A	King	Streetcar; eastbound to Distillery Loop
505	Dundas	Streetcar; eastbound to Broadview station

== Connection to Bloor GO station ==
Metrolinx contracted to build a connection between Dundas West station and the nearby Bloor GO Station via a new pedestrian tunnel at the east end of the subway platforms. Customers transferring from the TTC to GO/UPX need to walk 500 metres (1,600 ft) east along city streets from the only station entrance at the west end of the subway platforms. The new tunnel will shorten that distance to 200 metres (660 ft). The work includes:

- a new concourse in the lower level of the Crossways’ building
- elevator access to the TTC platform level
- two elevators and a stairwell to connect GO's Bloor tunnel to a new TTC concourse
- an electrical backup system in case of power outages

Metrolinx began proceedings to expropriate necessary properties for a pedestrian tunnel in September 2017. It intended to start construction in 2018, but this was delayed when the ownership of the Crossways changed hands. Metrolinx expected property within the Crossways' parking garage necessary for tunnel construction to be transferred to Metrolinx in 2019. By August 2023, the contract to construct the pedestrian connection between the two stations was awarded to Kenaidan Contracting. Construction began in May 2024. The project was delayed while Metrolinx and TTC officials negotiated with the owners of the Crossways, and as of 2025, no official opening date for the tunnel had been announced.

In 2011, Metrolinx predicted there would be 2,000 transfers between the two stations by 2031. As of 2023, there were approximately 600 daily transfers.
