= GO Expansion =

Railway expansion project in Ontario, Canada

Overview
- Owner: Metrolinx
- Locale: Greater Golden Horseshoe, Ontario

Service
- Type: Regional rail
- System: GO Transit
- Services: Lakeshore East line, Lakeshore West line, Kitchener line, Barrie line, Stouffville line, Union Pearson Express
- Operator: GO Transit
- Ridership: 178 million annually (projected by 2031)

History
- Planned opening: TBA

Technical
- Line length: 262 km (163 mi)
- Track gauge: 1,435 mm (4 ft 8 1/2 in)
- Electrification: 25 kV 60 Hz AC from overhead catenary
- Operating speed: Up to 140 km/h (87 mph)
- Signalling: ETCS level 2

GO Expansion, previously known as GO Regional Express Rail (RER), is an ongoing project to improve GO Transit train service by adding all day two-way service to the inner portions of the Barrie line, Kitchener line and the Stouffville line, and by increasing frequency of train service on various lines to every 15 minutes or better on five of the corridors. This would be achieved with the electrification of the Lakeshore East line and Lakeshore West line, and include the deployment of new electric multiple-unit trainsets, with the legacy fleet for both lines being moved to their neighbouring counterparts. The project would require 150 kilometres (93 mi) of new track, including new bridges and tunnels. GO Expansion is one of the Big Move rapid transit projects.

In 2018, the project was expected to be completed in 2032 at a cost of $32 billion. As of 2025, an internal Metrolinx report revised the completion date to about 10 years later.

== History ==
=== Background ===
GO Transit has historically offered two-way, all-day service along its Lakeshore East and Lakeshore West lines, while only providing peak rush hour service on its other lines. As part of the 2011 Ontario general election, Ontario premier Dalton McGuinty also made a campaign pledge to provide two-way, all-day train service on all corridors.

=== Regional Express Rail ===
The Big Move outlined the building of express and regional rail service improvements across the existing GO Transit network. Other improvements included extensions to Hamilton and Bowmanville, as well as new GO Transit corridors to Bolton, Seaton and Locust Hill. As part of the Phase 2 announcement, Metrolinx stated that the Kitchener and Lakeshore lines would be electrified, as well as the Union Pearson Express.

Metrolinx exhibits
- Map of orginally proposed GO Rail Electrification

This vision of two-way, full-day train service on all corridors eventually included electrification of the system and was renamed Regional Express Rail. With Regional Express Rail, Metrolinx expects to nearly triple ridership to 175 million riders per year by about 2031 from 65.7 million in 2015. GO Regional Express Rail's goals would be achieved with the electrification of core sections of the GO Transit train system while also expanding the use of diesel service in others, as follows:

- The Lakeshore West line between Aldershot and Union Station
- The Lakeshore East line between Oshawa and Union Station
- The Kitchener line between Bramalea and Union Station, including the Union Pearson Express service
- The Barrie line between Allandale Waterfront (Barrie) and Union Station
- The Stouffville line between Old Elm and Union Station

The electrified network will ultimately extend to 262 route-kilometres (163 mi), with six traction substations and 11 traction distribution facilities (switching or parallelling stations).

On March 31, 2017, the federal government announced it would contribute $1.9 billion of the estimated $13.5 billion cost of GO Expansion. The Kitchener line was to receive at least $750 million of the federal funding for infrastructure upgrades, including 40 kilometres (25 mi) of new track. The Barrie line, Lakeshore East line, and Lakeshore West line were to share the balance of the federal funding for upgrades and 88 kilometres (55 mi) of new track.

=== GO Expansion ===
In 2019, the Regional Express Rail (RER) program was officially rebranded as the GO Rail Expansion program. On February 23, 2022, Metrolinx announced that the preferred bidder for the contract was ONxpress Transportation Partners, a consortium that includes Aecon, FCC Construcción, Alstom, and Deutsche Bahn, among others. Under its $1.6-billion contract, ONxpress was to complete Phase 1 of the GO Expansion project, which included designing key infrastructure such as signalling systems and upgrades to Hydro One power infrastructure. Phase 1 also included determining the full scope of the project. The consortium was also to start construction for grade separations at rail and road crossings.

The contract was finalized on April 19, 2022; Alstom announced it would be implementing the European Rail Traffic Management System for the signalling on the upgraded network, the first use of that standard in North America. According to Metrolinx, ETCS would allow more trains to be on the line simultaneously, citing the words of University of Birmingham visiting lecturer Tyson Moore, who stated that systems with ETCS were "allowing trains to get closer together while still respecting basic safety margins". The signalling system on the GO network was to implement ETCS level 2.

The new signaling combined with electrification, Metrolinx estimated that with GO Expansion would have the ability to run up to three times more trains than the 3,500 trains per week it ran in 2019. The busiest routes could operate between 8 and 18 trains per hour. Combined service on the quadruple track Lakeshore West line could possibly be as frequent as every three-and-a-half minutes during peak periods. Trains could be arriving at major GO hubs such as Exhibition, Bloor and East Harbour at a frequency of every 3 minutes each direction and every 5-minutes each direction at major stations such as Burlington and Pickering. Evening and weekend service could be as frequent as every 6 to 15 minutes. Jonathan English, the director of transportation policy for the Toronto Region Board of Trade noted that the GO Expansion plan will allow GO Lines to "function a lot more like subways than commuter trains". Electric trains can accelerate and decelerate faster at stations, trip times could be reduced on average by 10 minutes with a maximum reduction of up to 20 to 30 minutes.

Construction for the electrification of lines was to begin in 2023, with partial implementation in 2025 and 2026 and full completion in 2032. The project entailed the electrification of over 600 kilometres (370 mi) of track, including 200 kilometres (120 mi) of new track. In January 2024, Metrolinx announced that, starting January 1, 2025, ONxpress would take over the operation and maintenance of the GO Transit train system in addition to the responsibility of introducing the improvements required for GO Expansion. ONxpress has a division named ONxpress Operations, which consists of Deutsche Bahn International Operations and Aecon Concessions.

=== Termination of ONExpress ===
On May 17, 2025, Metrolinx announced the termination of the agreement with ONxpress Operations. In addition, funding to the expansion program was reduced in 2025. Concerns grew that, between the termination of the ONxpress agreement and cuts in funding, the project was being "de-scoped", with less ambitious targets being set in terms of reductions in speed, and track and station upgrades, and with only the Lakeshore East and West lines and UP Express being electified. Ontario MPP Andrea Hazell requested that the auditor general look into Metrolinx's decision to cancel the contract with ONxpress Operations. Despite this, vice president of fleet and engineering Rob Sherrin denied that GO Expansion had stalled in July 2025.

In March 2026, the Ontario NDP obtained a March 2025 internal Metrolinx document via a freedom of information request. The document stated that the implementation of all-day, two-way GO train service would arrive 10 years later than the original estimated 2032 date. Users of the Kitchener and Barrie lines would have slower service due to stops at future new GO stations. The report indicated there would be electrification along the Lakeshore West and Lakeshore East lines but not along most of the Stouffville, Kitchener and Barrie lines as originally proposed in the Regional Express Rail plan. Only partial electrification of the Lakeshore lines could be implemented by about 2035.

== Electrification ==
With the cancellation of the ONxpress contract in 2025, the electrification project was severely scaled back to only cover the Lakeshore Line between Oshawa and Burlington, with completion planned for 2038. Crucially, the decrease in travel time is no longer part of the plan.

== Proposed frequencies ==
=== Two-way all-day service ===
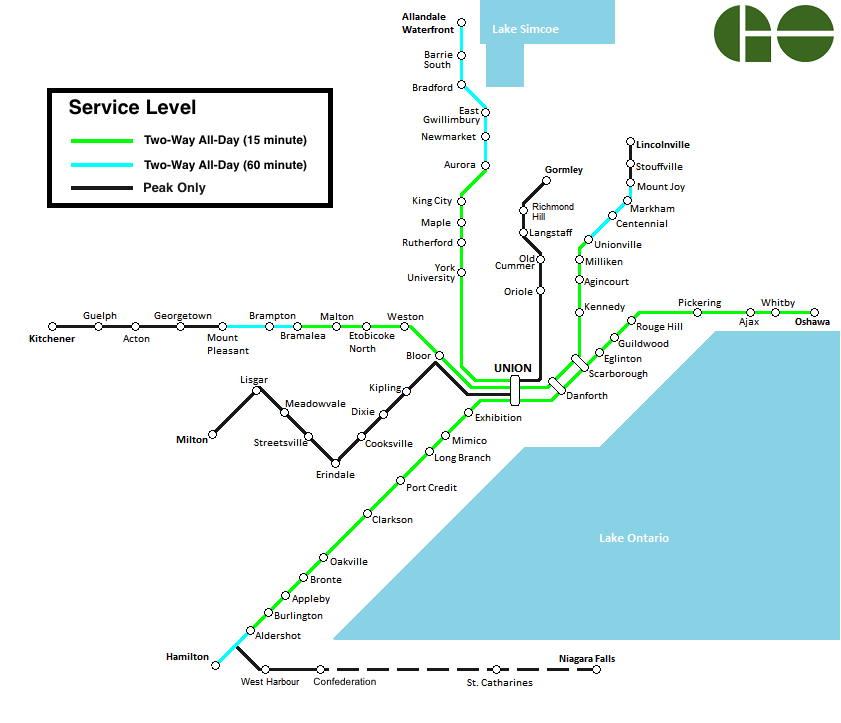
Map of proposed GO Transit Regional Express Rail services

GO Expansion will see many sections of GO train lines receiving two-way all-day service. Sections proposed to get two-way all-day 15-minute or better are:

- Lakeshore West line between Burlington and Union Station
- Lakeshore East line between Oshawa and Union Station
- Kitchener line between Bramalea and Union Station
- Barrie line between Bradford and Union Station
- Stouffville line between Unionville and Union Station

Sections proposed to get two-way all-day 30-minute service are:

- Kitchener line between Mount Pleasant and Union Station (every 15 minutes in peak period)

Sections proposed to get two-way all-day 60-minute service are:

- Lakeshore West line between West Harbour and Union Station (already in effect since August 7, 2021)
- Lakeshore West line between Hamilton GO Centre and Union Station
- Kitchener line between Kitchener and Union Station (every 30 minutes in peak period)
- Barrie line between Allandale Waterfront (Barrie) and Union Station
- Stouffville line between Mount Joy (Markham) and Union Station

=== Peak direction service ===
GO Expansion will also see more frequent weekday, peak-direction service on the following routes:

- Every 15 minutes on the Lakeshore West line between Hamilton GO Centre and Union Station
- Every 15 minutes on the Milton line
- Every 30 minutes on the Barrie line between Allandale Waterfront (Barrie) and Union Station
- Every 15 minutes on the Richmond Hill line
- Every 20 minutes on the Stouffville line between Old Elm and Union Station

=== Express service ===
Stations between Oakville and Hamilton on the Lakeshore West line, between Bramalea and Kitchener on the Kitchener line, and between Pickering and Oshawa on the Lakeshore East line are proposed to receive express service to and from Union Station.

== Signalling ==
As part of GO Expansion, Metrolinx will deploy ERTMS level 1 in order to provide more frequent service, marking the first implementation of ERTMS in North America.

== New stations ==
Metrolinx plans to build several new stations as part of GO Expansion, including Breslau, Innisfil, Kirby, Mulock, and Spadina–Front.

=== SmartTrack ===
SmartTrack started out as a proposed regional express rail surface service to run mostly within the City of Toronto. It was proposed by John Tory during his successful mayoral campaign in 2014. The SmartTrack proposal depends on electrification of the Stouffville and Kitchener corridors where SmartTrack service would run.

As a part of the agreement reached between Metrolinx and the City of Toronto, five stations were to be built within the City of Toronto and were expected to open by 2026; these are Stockyards, Junction Triangle, King–Liberty (Liberty Village), East Harbour, and Finch–Kennedy.

== See also ==
- Caltrain Modernization Program
- Réseau Express Régional
- Moscow Central Diameters
- Toronto subway
- South Wales Metro
- S-train
