= Mount Joy, Markham =

Mount Joy
- Neighbourhood
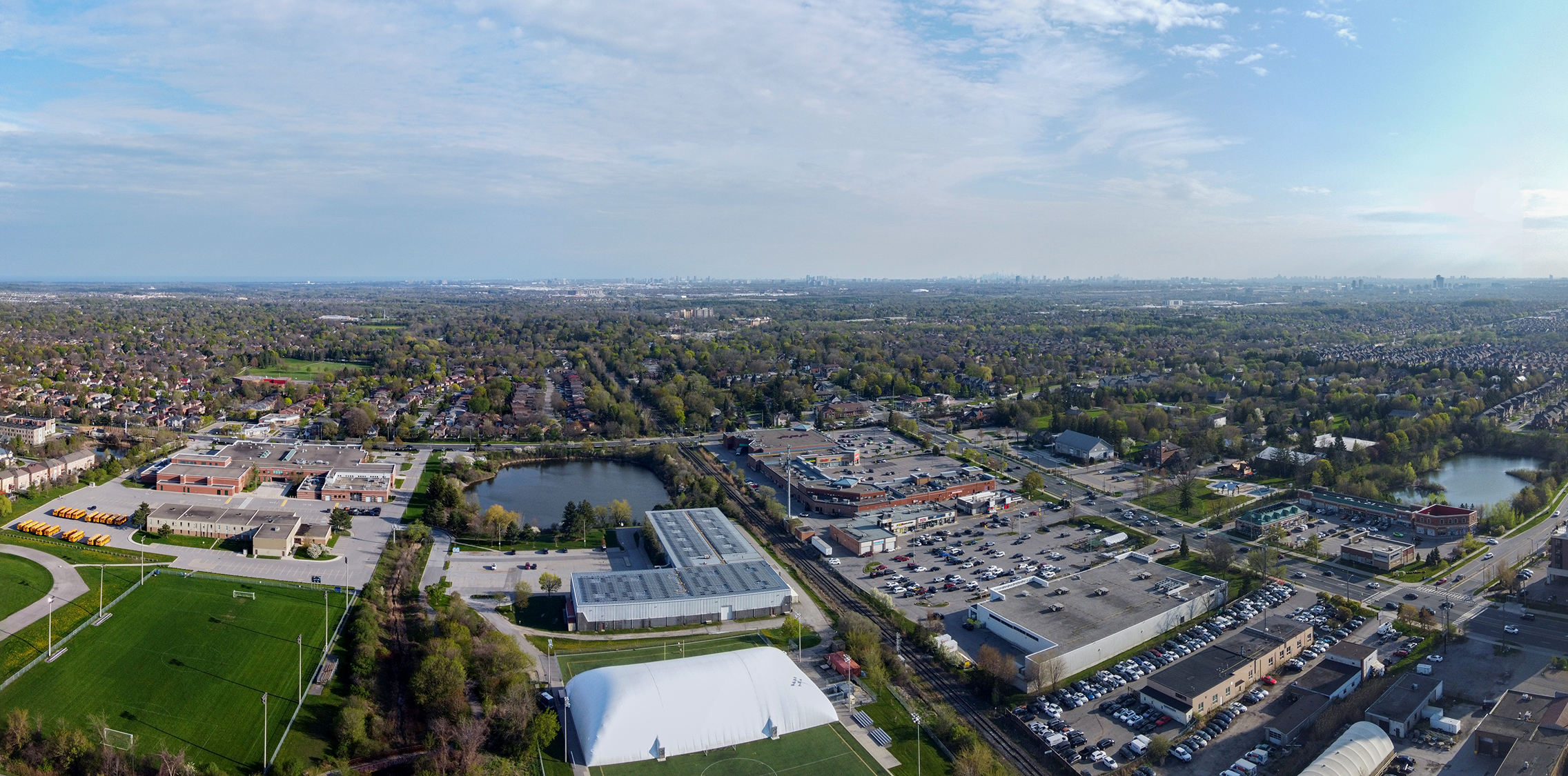
- Aerial view of Mount Joy
- Interactive map of Mount Joy
- Coordinates: 43°53′17″N 79°15′47″W
- Country: Canada
- Province: Ontario
- Regional municipality: York
- City: Markham
- Area codes: 905 and 289
- NTS Map: 030M14
- GNBC Code: FCFAS

Mount Joy is a community located in the north part of Markham, Ontario, Canada near Highway 48 and 16th Avenue and part of the former Township of Markham.

Mount Joy became a police village in 1907, but absorbed into Markham Village in 1915. A non-farm settlement developed on Main Street North and Peter Street from Beech Street to 16th Avenue. Like Quantztown, the former farm land in the area has given way to new homes. Only a handful of homes on Peter Street, former George Rodd General Store / Mount Joy Post Office and the old Mount Joy Public School (built 1907 and closed 1969) are left of the former police village. The area north of 16th Avenue to Bur Oak Avenue emerged in the 1980s and not part of the original police village.

== Parks and recreation ==
- Mount Joy Park

== Mount Joy Community Centre ==
Mount Joy Community Centre and Arena
- Interactive map of Mount Joy Community Centre and Arena
- Location: 6140 Sixteenth Avenue, Markham, Ontario
- Owner: City of Markham
- Operator: City of Markham
- Capacity: Ice hockey 300

Construction
- Opened: 1988

Mount Joy Community Centre opened in 1988 consists of an indoor ice arena and a larger outdoor soccer pitch/football field.

== Transportation ==
GO Transit's Stouffville Line has a station stop, Mount Joy, on the borders of this community. The station is also served by GO bus routes 70 and 71. 71 runs between Union Station and Uxbridge, while 70 runs between Unionville and Uxbridge.

York Region Transit routes 16 and 18 pass through this area. The area is also served by YRT's 407 Express routes 300, 301, 303, and 304, all of which terminate at Mount Joy GO Station.

== Culture ==
- Markham Museum

There are many Halal Restaurants who bring a variety of South Asian, Central Asian and Middle Eastern cuisines. Some Italian Food Shops like Pizza and Pasta are easily found in the area.

=== Religion ===
- Islamic Centre of Markham / Masjid Darul Iman
- Cham Shan Buddhist Temple has a satellite location south of the Mount Joy GO Station
