= King–Liberty GO Station =

Planned commuter train station in Toronto

King–Liberty

General information
- Location: North of King Street West between Joe Shuster Way and Sudbury Street; Toronto, Ontario
- Coordinates: 43°38′27″N 79°25′26″W
- Owner: Metrolinx
- Platforms: 2 island platforms
- Tracks: 4
- Connections: TTC buses 501 Queen 504 King

Construction
- Accessible: Yes

History
- Opening: Beyond 2030

Services
Preceding station	GO Transit	Following station
Bloor towards Stratford	Kitchener Planned expansion	Union Terminus
Preceding station	Metrolinx	Following station
Union Pearson Express does not stop here
Location

Metrolinx exhibit
- Artist rendition of Sudbury St entrance
- Artist rendition of station platform area

King–Liberty GO Station (also referred to as Liberty Village GO Station) is a planned regional train station in Toronto, Ontario, Canada. It will be an infill station on the Kitchener line of GO Transit located between Union Station and Bloor GO Station. The station is one of five GO stations to be built as part of the SmartTrack Stations Program to adapt regional commuter service for urban public transit. The construction contract was awarded in 2022; construction is planned to begin in 2024 and completed in 2028. In December 2024, Toronto city council deferred the construction of two stations including King–Liberty due to lack of funding. The station could now open in 2030 if additional funding from the province of Ontario is provided.

== Description ==
The station will be located between Joe Shuster Way and Sudbury Street, north of King Street West. The station building will have two glass towers suspending a glass-enclosed bridge over the tracks with stairs and elevators descending to the two island platforms. One tower will face Joe Shuster Way and the other Sudbury Street. From the Sudbury Street tower, there will be a long enclosed ramp descending from bridge level to street level between Sudbury Street and the railway right-of-way towards Queen Street. The station service building will be located at the foot of the ramp. On the north side of King Street and at the west portal of the King Street West Subway Bridge, there will be another tower with a pedestrian bridge crossing over to the island platforms at their southern end. From the base of this tower there will also be a pedestrian bridge crossing King Street parallel to the railway bridge. This will give the station four entry points. The entrance towers will have elevators, and the platforms will have canopies. There will be bicycle parking at each entrance. Bicycles will be allowed on the ramp along Sudbury Street to allow cyclists to cross over the tracks to Joe Shuster Way.

There are seven tracks passing through the future station area. The new station platforms will serve the four tracks of the Kitchener line. Ultimately, there could be eight tracks through the area.

== Construction ==
During planning, Metrolinx had to take three heritage structures into account:

- The building at 55 Sudbury Street (opposite Dovercourt Road) will be protected from construction activity.
- The building at 99 Sudbury Street (opposite Lisgar Street) will be demolished to make way for station construction. Before demolition, Metrolinx will photo-document the structure for commemorative purposes. Bricks from the building will be salvaged for possible reuse.
- A small portion of the King Street West Subway Bridge will be impacted by construction.

== TTC connections ==
TTC routes that may serve the new station are:

- 29 Dufferin
- 63 Ossington
- 501 Queen
- 504 King
- 508 Lake Shore
