= Mount Dennis station =

Intermodal transit terminal in Toronto, Canada

Mount Dennis
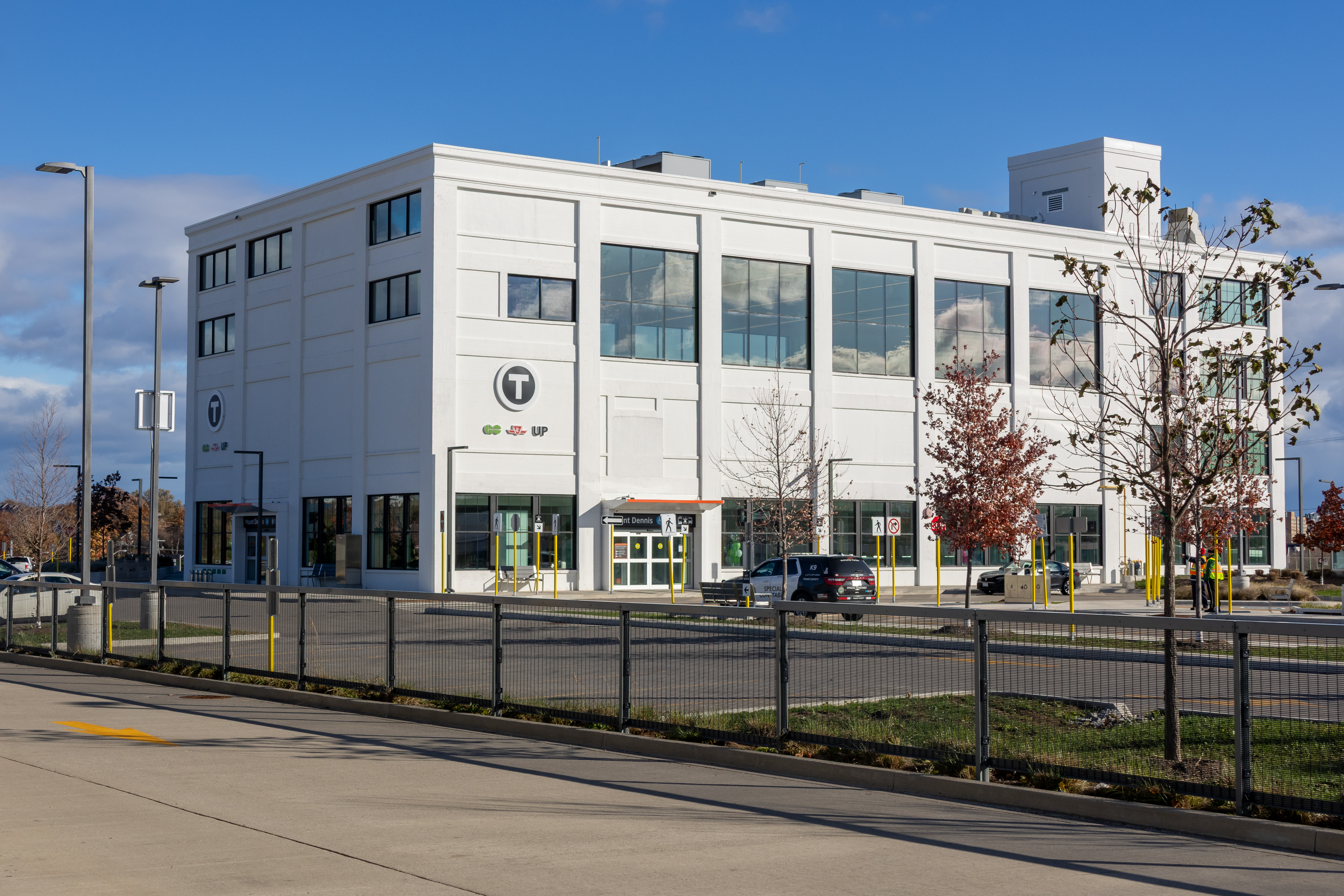
- Former Kodak Building 9 transformed as a part of the station

General information
- Location: 3500 Eglinton Avenue West; Toronto, Ontario; Canada
- Coordinates: 43°41′15″N 79°29′14″W
- Owner: Metrolinx
- Tracks: 2 (TTC); 4 (GO Transit / UP)
- Connections: TTC buses: 27 Jane South; 32 Eglinton West; 34 Eglinton; 35 Jane; 71 Runnymede; 73B Royal York; 89 Weston; 161 Rogers Rd; 164 Castlefield; 168 Symington; 171 Mount Dennis; 334 Eglinton; 989 Weston Express

Construction
- Structure type: At-grade
- Accessible: Yes
- Architect: Arcadis

Other information
- Station code: GO Transit: MD
- Fare zone: 4 (GO Transit)

History
- Opened: November 16, 2025; 12 months ago (TTC buses, GO, & UP); February 8, 2026; 9 months ago (Line 5)

Services
| Preceding station | Toronto Transit Commission | Following station |
|---|---|---|
| Terminus | Line 5 Eglinton | Keelesdale towards Kennedy |
| Preceding station | GO Transit | Following station |
| Weston towards Stratford | Kitchener | Bloor towards Union |
| Preceding station | Metrolinx | Following station |
| Weston toward Pearson Airport | Union Pearson Express | Bloor toward Union |
Future services
| Preceding station | Toronto Transit Commission | Following station |
|---|---|---|
| Jane towards Renforth | Line 5 west extension (opens 2031) | Keelesdale towards Kennedy |
| Preceding station | Metrolinx | Following station |
| Weston toward Pearson Airport | Union Pearson Express | Stockyards (opens 2031) toward Union |
Track layout
Key
Location

Mount Dennis station is an intermodal transit terminal in Toronto, Ontario, Canada. It is the western terminus for Line 5 Eglinton of the Toronto subway system, as well as a stop on GO Transit's Kitchener line, and the Union Pearson Express. Located on Eglinton Avenue between the intersections of Weston Road and Black Creek Drive, it is a designated Metrolinx mobility hub and opened on November 16, 2025, for GO Transit, Toronto Transit Commission bus, and UP Express services, and February 8, 2026, for Line 5 service.

The station is named after the Mount Dennis neighbourhood where it is located and its signage bears the subtitle Weston Road on the Line 5 platform. It is situated on the lands formerly known as Kodak Heights, which was a camera manufacturing facility operated by the Eastman Kodak Company from 1918 until 2006. The station uses Kodak Building 9, which is a recreational heritage building and local landmark used as a station entrance.

== History ==
Mount Dennis was originally conceived as York Centre station – named after the City of York, a municipality within the former Metropolitan Toronto before it was amalgamated into the present Toronto – which was planned to be the western terminus of an earlier proposed Eglinton West subway line. This was one of the three proposed subway lines in the Network 2011 plan created in 1985 by the Toronto Transit Commission (TTC). Construction started in 1994 but was subsequently halted when the project was shelved in 1995 following the election of a Progressive Conservative government led by Mike Harris. That station was planned to be located at Black Creek Drive on the south side of Eglinton Avenue, as opposed to the farther-west north side location of Mount Dennis, and would also have been an intermodal station serving the Kitchener line.

A draft prepared on April 10, 2013, established four designs for the station. In all the designs, the underground Line 5 Eglinton platform was 150 metres (490 ft) long, enough for a four-car trainset. Two designs placed the bus platform on the north side of Eglinton, accessed through a 230-metre (750 ft) pedestrian tunnel. In two designs other than the final product, the bus platforms were on the south side of Eglinton, accessed through a 260-metre (850 ft) pedestrian tunnel.

By early 2016, the finalized design placed the bus loop on the north side of the station, accessed by a relocated Photography Drive bridge that crosses Eglinton further to the east than the old bridge. This roadway would pass east of the renovated Kodak building, which would form the station's third entrance. In February 2016, the original Photography Drive bridge over Eglinton Avenue was demolished to make way for construction on the Mount Dennis station site. In August of that year, the former Kodak building was temporarily moved 60 metres (200 ft) to facilitate construction. On November 13, 2017, the building was moved back to sit on a newly built foundation. The community wanted this landmark preserved; thus, it became an integral part of the new station.

By mid-2019, track had been laid from the Line 5 station eastwards beyond the junction with the Eglinton Maintenance and Storage Facility and escalators and wall tiles were being installed; graffiti had been removed from the Kodak building and restoration work to its interior was in progress. By the fourth quarter of 2020, light rail vehicles were making test runs between Mount Dennis and Keelesdale stations.

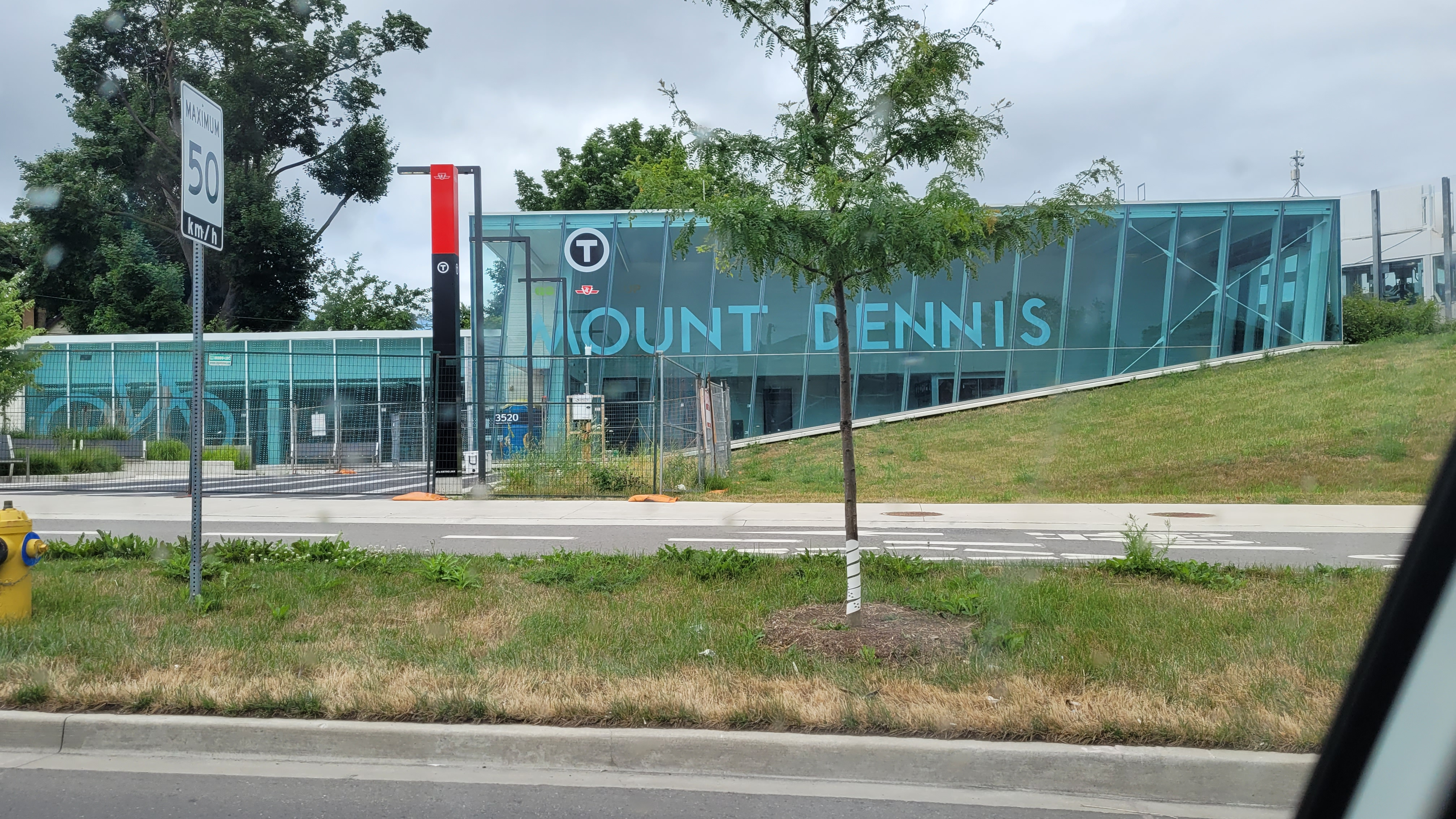
Main entrance to Mount Dennis station prior to opening in 2024

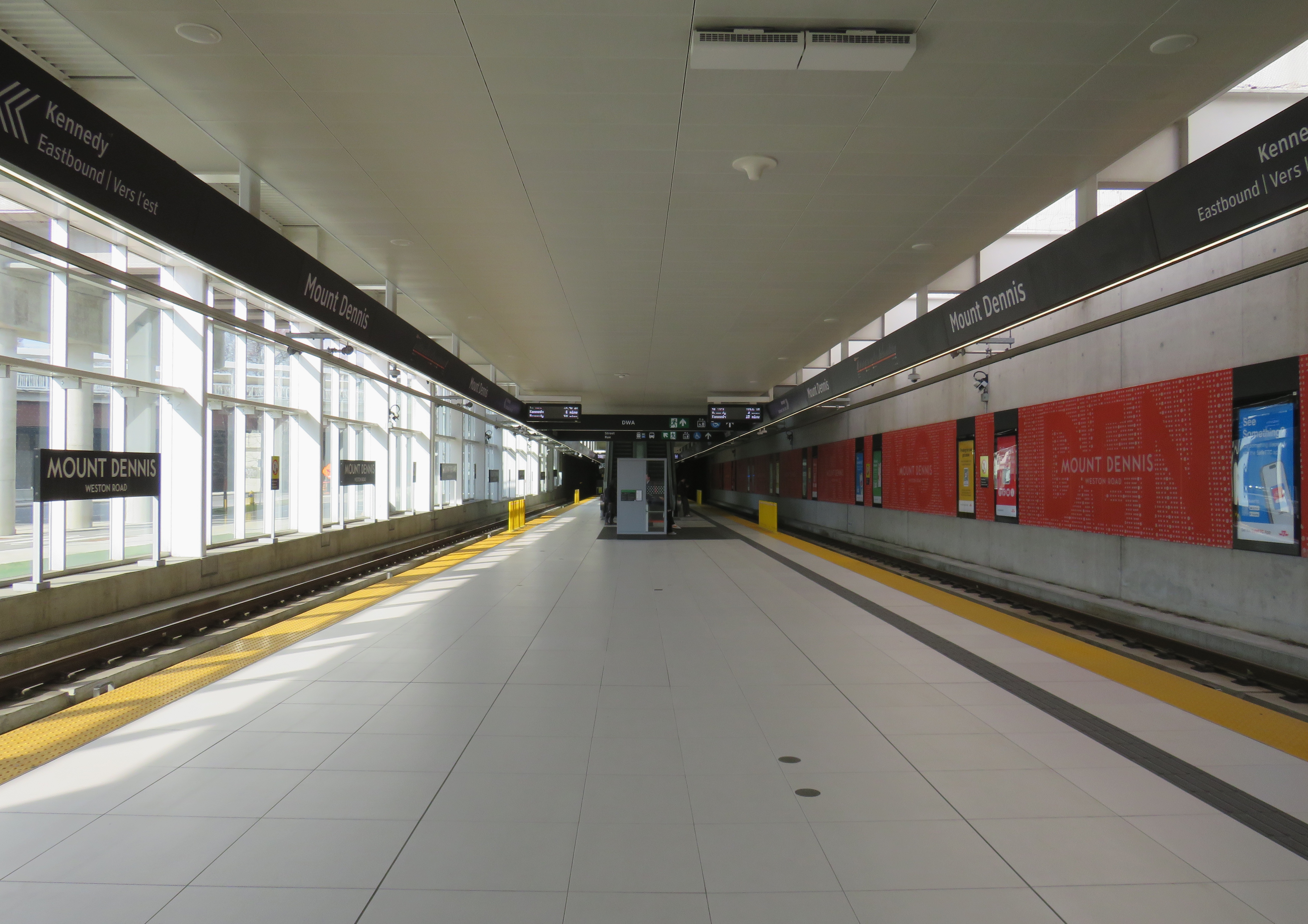
Line 5 platform

On October 23, 2025, the province announced that the GO and UP Express platforms of the station would be opening on November 16, 2025, no matter the status of Line 5. Line 5 service to the station began with its opening on February 8, 2026.

== Description ==
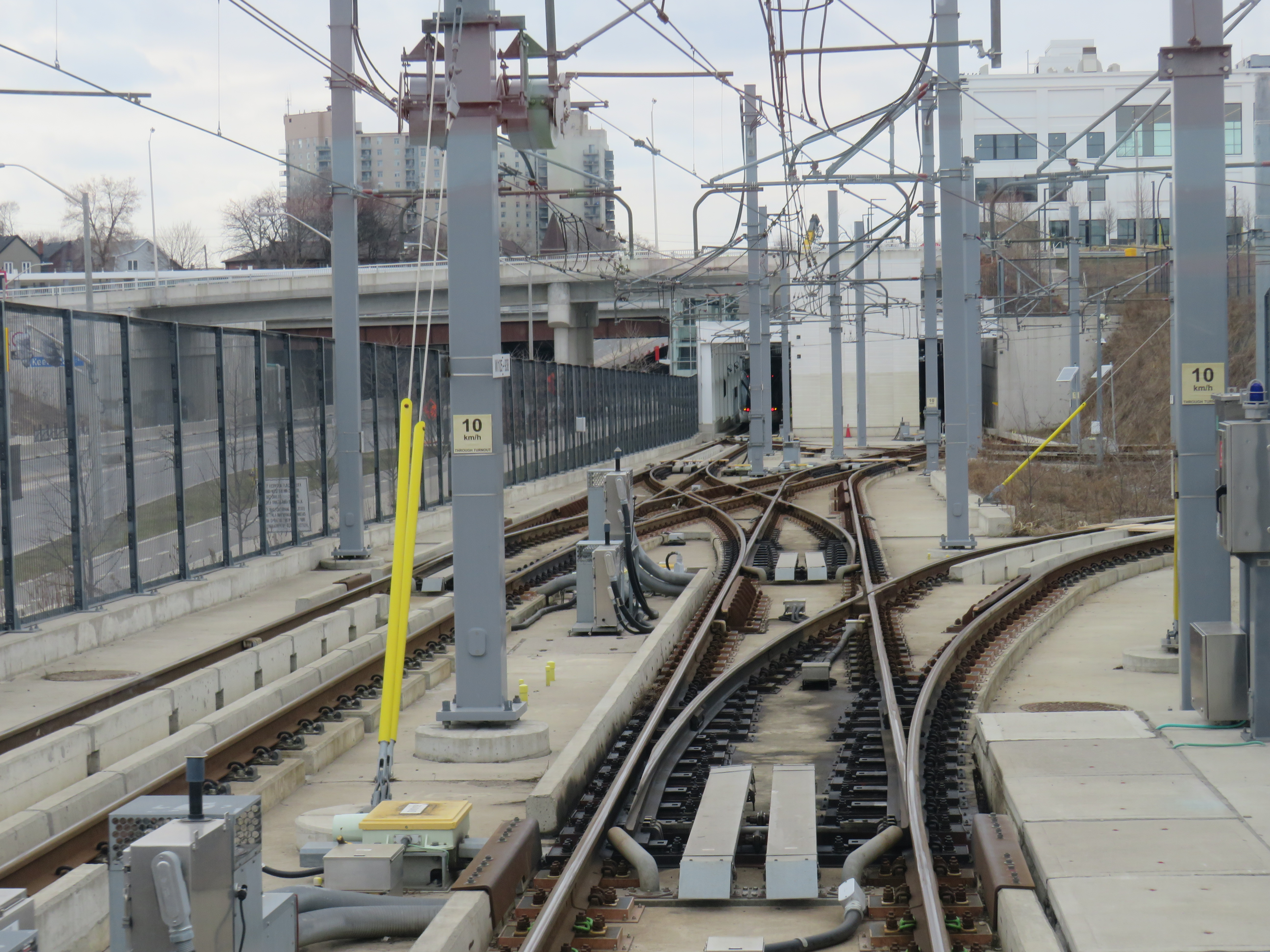
Mount Dennis station crossover (background) with the east lead-in track to the Eglinton Maintenance and Storage Facility (foreground)

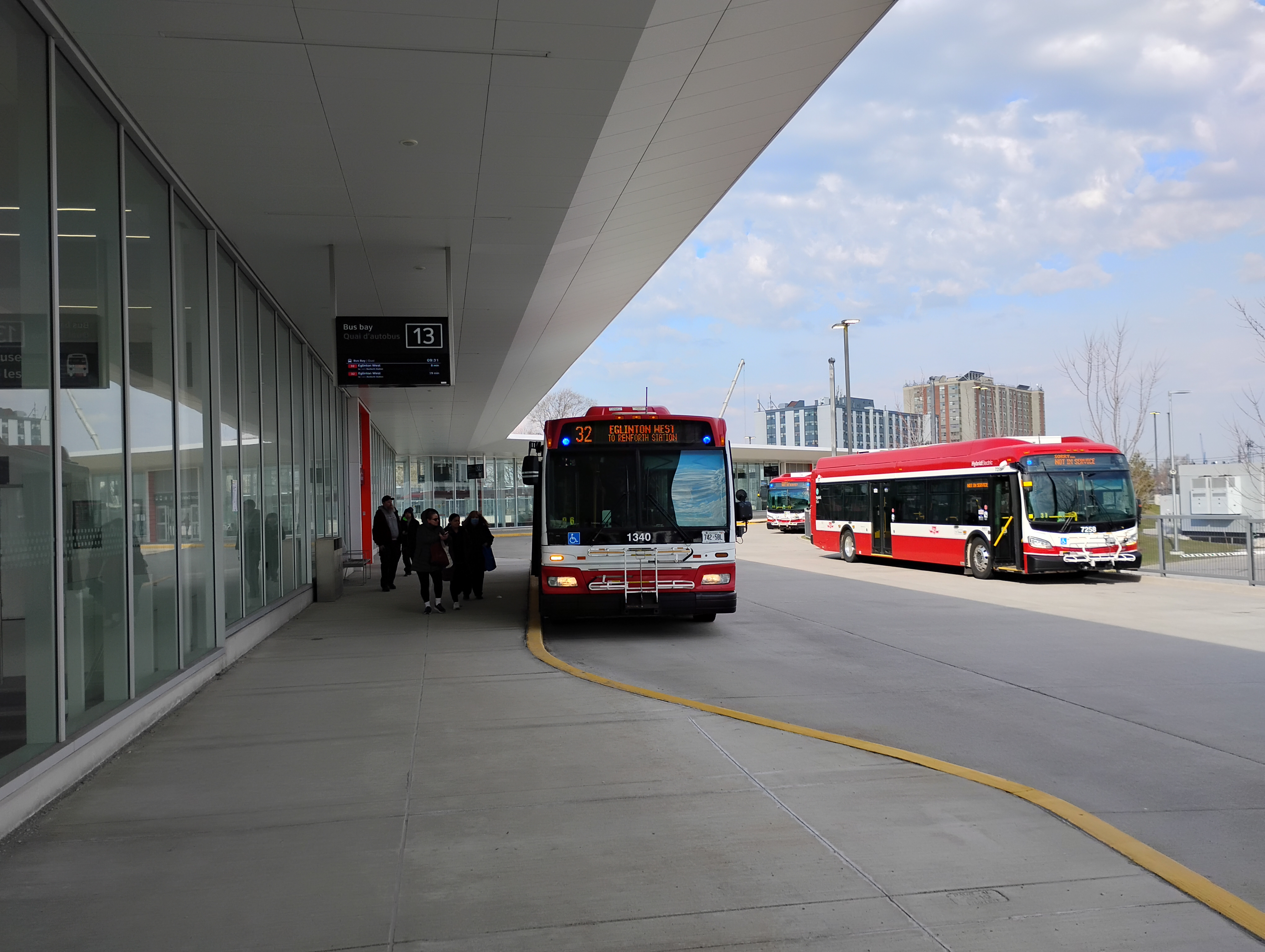
TTC bus terminal

In addition to being a landmark and of heritage interest, the former Kodak building is a focal point for riders using the mobility hub, as many of the mobility hub's features are linked to this building. It has a waiting area and public washrooms, and retail spaces on the bus bay and main concourse level. The upper floors of the building will be used for rented offices, to provide a space for community use, and will include an auditorium.

The station has three entrances:

- The main entrance and a station plaza are located between Weston Road and the GO Transit Kitchener rail corridor. There is an underground passage from the main entrance to the former Kodak building.
- The secondary entrance is located at street level on the north side of Eglinton Avenue West on the east side of the rail corridor bridges.
- The third entrance and another station plaza are at the former Kodak building.

The hub encompasses the following services:

- GO Transit and UP Express station has platforms along the Kitchener rail corridor and is accessible from the underground connection between the main entrance and the waiting room in the former Kodak building.
- The off-street TTC bus terminal has 15 bays and is connected to the former Kodak building. The bus terminal will have its own space for retail.
- The passenger pick-up and drop-off area is available to riders of any of the hub's transit services. There are also four taxi stands nearby.
- Bicycle storage will include 40 outdoor and 80 indoor spaces. Indoor storage will be provided at the main entrance.

=== Architecture and artwork ===
The station was designed by Arcadis, following an architectural concept designed by architects gh3* from Toronto and Daoust Lestage Lizotte Stecker from Montreal. As with other stations on Line 5, architectural features include natural light from large windows, including a window wall on the south side of the platform level, and skylights, steel structures painted white, and orange accents (the colour of the line).

As part of a program to install artworks at major interchange stations along Line 5 Eglinton, Mount Dennis station features two artworks:

- Up to This Moment, by Hadley + Maxwell, a video display of an image documenting changes to the Kodak Heights site. The image displayed changes daily. The artwork is located on the east wall of the upper concourse; it is visible from Eglinton Avenue through the south-side glass wall of the station.
- An untitled wall mural by Sara Cwynar that features a collage of photographic images, digitally printed on layered glass panels. The artwork is located along a pedestrian corridor within the station.

=== Track infrastructure ===
As Mount Dennis is a terminal station for Line 5, there is a diamond crossover to the east for reversing trains and tail tracks for overnight train storage to the west. Flanking the crossover is the lead-in trackage to the Eglinton Maintenance and Storage Facility to the north, which includes an additional trailing-point crossover to the east to access the eastbound mainline. The line then crosses Black Creek Drive and the eponymous Black Creek on an elevated guideway before descending into the western portal of the line's underground tunnels towards Keelesdale station.

== Surface connections ==
The following bus routes serve Mount Dennis station:

| Bay number | Route | Name | Additional information |
|---|---|---|---|
| 1 | Spare | | |
| 2 | 27 | Jane South | Southbound to Jane station |
| 3 | 89 | Weston | Southbound to Keele station |
| 4 | 989 | Weston Express | Southbound to Keele station (Rush hour service) |
| 5 | 168 | Symington | Southbound to Dundas West station |
| 6 | 71 | Runnymede | Southbound to Runnymede station |
| 6 | 171A | Mount Dennis | Southbound to Jane Street and Alliance Avenue |
| 7 | 73B | Royal York | Southbound to Royal York station via Emmett Avenue and La Rose Avenue |
| 8 | 34 | Eglinton | Eastbound to Kennedy station |
| 8 | 164 | Castlefield | Eastbound to Cedarvale station via Keelesdale station |
| 9 | 71 | Runnymede | Northbound to Industry Street |
| 9 | 171A | Mount Dennis | Northbound to Industry Street |
| 10 | 161 | Rogers Road | Eastbound to Ossington station |
| 11 | 89 | Weston | Northbound to Albion Road |
| 12 | 989 | Weston Express | Northbound to Steeles Avenue West (Rush hour service) |
| 13 | 32 | Eglinton West | Westbound to Renforth station |
| 14 | Spare | | |
| 15 | 35A | Jane | Northbound to Pioneer Village station |
| 15 | 35B | Jane | Northbound to Pioneer Village station via Hullmar Drive |
| 15 | Wheel-Trans | | |
| N/A | 334A | Eglinton | Blue Night service; eastbound to Kennedy station and westbound to Renforth Drive and Pearson Airport (On-street connection) |
| N/A | 334B | Eglinton | Blue Night service; eastbound to Finch Avenue East and Neilson Road via Morningside Avenue |
