= East Harbour Transit Hub =

Under construction railway station in Toronto, Canada

East Harbour

General information
- Location: Eastern Avenue, Toronto, Ontario
- Coordinates: 43.6551°N 79.3476°W
- Owner: Metrolinx
- Platforms: 3 island platforms
- Tracks: 4 (GO Transit); 2 (Ontario Line)

Construction
- Accessible: Yes

History
- Opening: 2028; 2 years' time (GO Transit)
- Electrified: December 2036; 10 years' time (Lakeshore East; planned)

Future services
Preceding station	GO Transit	Following station
Union Terminus	Lakeshore East (planned expansion)	Danforth towards Bowmanville
Union Terminus	Stouffville	Kennedy towards Old Elm
Preceding station	Toronto Transit Commission	Following station
Distillery District towards Exhibition	Ontario Line (opens 2030s)	Leslieville towards Don Valley
Location

The East Harbour Transit Hub is a combined commuter and rapid transit station under construction in Toronto, Ontario, Canada. For GO Transit, it will be an infill station serving both the Lakeshore East and Stouffville lines. It will also be a station on the future Ontario Line, a subway line under construction as part of the Toronto subway. There will also be provision for a future streetcar line serving the hub.

== Description ==
The East Harbour Transit Hub is being built along the existing railway embankment between Eastern Avenue and the Don Valley Parkway. The station will have six parallel tracks, two tracks for the Ontario Line on the northwest side of the railway embankment plus four tracks for GO trains on its southeast side. There will be three island platforms, each serving a pair of tracks: one platform for Ontario Line trains, one for westbound GO trains and another for eastbound GO trains. The GO platforms will serve both local and express trains. The station will serve GO trains running on the Lakeshore East and Stouffville lines. All platforms will have elevator access. The station concourse will have customer amenities and an accessible drop-off area. There will be secure and outdoor bike parking. The station will have six pedestrian entrances, three on each side of the station, to connect to the concourse.

After completion of the station, Broadview Avenue would be extended south from Eastern Avenue, passing under the station, to continue to Commissioners Street. There would be provision for a future streetcar service along the Broadview Avenue extension into the Port Lands. To the west of the station, there would be a multi-use path and trail bridge over the Don River to Corktown Common.

== History ==
The idea for a station at East Harbour originated from SmartTrack, a 2014 proposal by then-mayoral candidate John Tory to adapt GO Transit rail lines for urban transit. There were originally to be 13 new SmartTrack stations; however, by 2021, that number had fallen to five but still included East Harbour. The station would be near the site of a former Unilever soap factory.

By March 2018, the City of Toronto had a master plan to redevelop the East Harbour district and make it a transit-oriented development. The development would lie within a former industrial area bounded approximately by the Don River, Eastern Avenue, Booth Avenue and Lake Shore Boulevard. Development would include new streets, office buildings and public spaces. The city had hoped to make East Harbour a major employment centre, creating 50,000 local jobs.

In April 2019, the province announced that it would construct the Ontario Line. Thus, East Harbour would become an integrated transit hub serving both subway and GO Transit trains. The province wanted the East Harbour Transit Hub to be a "Union Station to the east".

By April 2021, the province proposed more residential development in the area. As of 2022, the plan called for a mixed-use community with 4,300 residential units.

In July 2023, work started to replace the railway bridge over Eastern Avenue with a wider bridge in order to handle the six tracks to pass through the station. On June 17, 2025, construction officially started for the station, to be built by a joint venture of AtkinsRéalis and Bird Construction with Hatch Ltd. as design partner, using an alliance contracting model.
