= Stockyards station =

Planned railway station in Toronto

Stockyards

General information
- Location: Union Street, north of St. Clair Avenue West; Toronto, Ontario
- Coordinates: 43°40′26″N 79°28′00″W
- Owner: Metrolinx
- Platforms: 2 side platforms 1 island platform
- Tracks: 4
- Connections: TTC buses 512 St. Clair

Construction
- Accessible: Yes

History
- Opening: 2031

Services
Preceding station	Metrolinx	Following station
Mount Dennis toward Pearson Airport	Union Pearson Express	Bloor toward Union
Preceding station	GO Transit	Following station
Kitchener does not stop here
Location

Stockyards is a planned railway station in Toronto, Ontario, Canada. It will be an infill station on the Union Pearson Express located between Mount Dennis station and Bloor GO Station. The station is one of five stations to be built as part of SmartTrack's station program to adapt regional commuter service for urban public transit. The construction contract was awarded in 2022.

Originally named "St. Clair West" in the original May 2014 SmartTrack proposal, and later "St. Clair–Old Weston" in June 2016, the station was renamed "Stockyards" by Metrolinx in August 2026. The station is named after The Stockyards, the northeastern quadrant of The Junction neighbourhood where it will be located. It was originally planned to be served by the Kitchener line of GO Transit. However, in late 2025, Metrolinx proposed that the station be served by the Union Pearson Express instead of the Kitchener line in order to guarantee 15-minute or better service frequencies along the latter. Construction of the station is scheduled to begin in 2026 with completion in 2031.

== Description ==
The station will be located on the west side of Union Street, north of St. Clair Avenue West between Weston Road and Old Weston Road. The station's main building will be located at the east side of the railway right-of-way at the south end with a second station building at the north end. A TTC bus loop will be located between the two buildings, and will have a Wheel-Trans bay. All three will be accessed from Union Street. A tunnel, accessible by stairs and elevators, will run under the tracks from each of the two station buildings to access the island platform and two side platforms. One side platform is between two tracks; the other is on the west side of the right-of-way. There will two pedestrian paths at each end of the side platform along the west side of the right-of-way; the north-end path leads from Weston Road and Gunns Road while the south end path leads from Weston Road and St. Clair Avenue.

There are multiple railway tracks passing through the station site. The eastern-most track is used by CP Rail and has no platform. The station design allows for an additional CP Rail track to be added on the east side of the right-of-way.

== Construction ==
Along with the station construction, there are three related road changes. These would be:

- St. Clair Avenue between Weston Road and Old Weston Road will be widened from four to six lanes. The present bridge will be demolished, and a wider replacement bridge will be built before constructing the station. The new bridge underpass will not be sufficiently wide to accommodate a streetcar stop with platforms given the two extra lanes. Land for street widening will be taken from the south side of the street because of townhouses on the northwest side of the bridge and Haydon House on the northeast side. Streetcar tracks will need to be shifted.
- Davenport Road will be extended north-west from Old Weston Road, to cross St. Clair Avenue on an overpass parallel to the railway overpass, turning north to connect with Union Street. Ramps and stairs would be provided for pedestrians from both sides of St. Clair Avenue to access Davenport Road and the station.
- Gunns Road will be extended east crossing Weston Road, passing under the railway right-of-way to end at Union Street.

The station site will be built on underutilized industrial land. The road changes and the station construction will be part of a single construction contract to be awarded to one contractor.

During planning, Metrolinx had to take two heritage structures into account:

- Heydon House, on the northwest corner of St. Clair Avenue and Old Weston Road, will be preserved undisturbed. The building was built circa 1890 and was originally a hotel frequented by railway workers.
- The railway bridge over St. Clair Avenue will be demolished. Before demolition, Metrolinx will photo-document the structure for commemorative purposes. Some artifacts from the bridge may be preserved.

== TTC connections ==
TTC routes that may serve the new station are:

- 41 Keele and 941 Keele Express
- 89 Weston and 989 Weston Express
- 127 Davenport
- 168 Symington
- 512 St. Clair

The nearest streetcar stops to the station will be at Weston Road (via a pedestrian path along the north side of St. Clair Avenue) and Old Weston Road (via Townsley Street). The walking distances would be about 160 m (520 ft) and 270 m (890 ft) respectively. Some local bus routes will be rerouted through to the bus loop at the station.
