= Spadina–Front GO Station =

Planned commuter train station in Toronto

Spadina–Front

General information
- Location: Spadina Avenue & Front Street West, Toronto, Ontario
- Coordinates: 43°38′31″N 79°23′42″W
- Owner: Metrolinx
- Platforms: Island platform
- Connections: 510 Spadina streetcar

Construction
- Parking: No

Services
Preceding station	GO Transit	Following station
Junction Triangle towards Allandale Waterfront	Barrie (planned expansion)	Union Terminus
Kitchener does not stop here
Milton does not stop here
Location

Spadina–Front GO Station (also referred to as Spadina GO Station) is a planned GO Transit train station to be built by Metrolinx in Toronto, Ontario, Canada, as part of the approved GO Transit Regional Express Rail. It will be situated downtown, south of Front Street between Spadina Avenue and Bathurst Street near office and residential towers. The station will be adjacent to the future Rail Deck Park, an urban park proposed by the City of Toronto. The main station entrance is planned for the intersection of Spadina Avenue and Front Street West.

By September 2022, Metrolinx had selected developers Dream Unlimited Corp. and Kilmer Group to create a mixed-use development at 433 Front Street West. The 0.40-hectare (1-acre) site is currently occupied by the North Bathurst Yard, a GO Transit train layover yard. The new development will be above and connected to the planned GO station.
