= Finch–Kennedy GO Station =

Proposed railway station in Ontario, Canada

Finch–Kennedy

General information
- Location: Finch Avenue east of Kennedy Road; Scarborough, Ontario; Canada
- Coordinates: 43°48′09.3″N 79°17′30.0″W
- Owner: Metrolinx
- Platforms: Side platforms
- Tracks: 2
- Connections: TTC buses

Construction
- Accessible: Yes

Other information
- Status: Planned

History
- Opening: Beyond 2030

Services
Preceding station	GO Transit	Following station
Agincourt towards Union	Stouffville Planned expansion	Milliken towards Old Elm
Location

Metrolinx exhibits
- Artist rendition of Finch–Kennedy GO Station, aerial perspective
- Artist rendition of Finch–Kennedy GO Station at street level

Finch–Kennedy GO Station (also referred to as Finch East GO Station) is a planned commuter train station in Toronto, Ontario, Canada. It will be an infill station on the Stouffville line of GO Transit in Scarborough, between Milliken GO and Agincourt GO. The station is one of five GO stations to be built as part of the SmartTrack Stations Program to adapt regional commuter service for urban public transit. The construction contract was awarded in 2022; construction is to start in October 2023 for completion in August 2027. In December 2024, Toronto city council deferred the construction of two stations including Finch–Kennedy due to lack of funding. The station could now open in 2030 if additional funding from the province of Ontario is provided.

A grade separation will be built prior to the construction of the station. The station will be located between Midland Avenue and Milliken Boulevard, and the station's main building on the north side of Finch Avenue East, on the east side of the railway right-of-way. The station will have two side platforms with canopies and heated shelters. From a new signalized intersection at Baylawn Drive and Finch Avenue, a new access road will provide vehicular access to the main station building where an accessible pedestrian pickup/drop-off area and bicycle parking will be located. Finch Avenue will be widened to six lanes under the railway bridge. The two curb lanes will be for buses only, able to accommodate three articulated buses in each direction. Bus riders from either direction can access either station platform via four access points below the railway bridge, each access point having stairs and an elevator. In addition to the six lanes, there will be pedestrian sidewalks and bicycle lanes under the bridge. The station will have a service building on the west side of the tracks opposite the main station building.

The following TTC bus routes are expected to serve the new station:

- 39 Finch East
- 339 Finch East Night Bus
- 939 Finch Express
- 57 Midland
