= Kirby GO Station =

Future railway station in Vaughan, Ontario, Canada

Kirby

General information
- Location: Kirby Road west of Keele Street; Vaughan, Ontario
- Coordinates: 43°53′21″N 79°31′28″W
- Owner: Metrolinx
- Platforms: Side platforms
- Tracks: 2 + 1 bypass
- Connections: York Region Transit

Construction
- Parking: 1000
- Accessible: Yes

Services
Preceding station	GO Transit	Following station
King City towards Allandale Waterfront	Barrie Planned expansion	Maple towards Union
Location

Kirby GO Station is a planned GO Transit train station to be built by Metrolinx on Kirby Road in Vaughan, Ontario on the Barrie line as part of GO Expansion. Approximately 1000 parking spaces will be provided on the east side of the station. A bus loop and a kiss and ride area will also be provided.

Although a station in the area had previously been supported by local politicians, it wasn't until 2015 that Metrolinx proposed it, as part of a larger list of possible future station sites. The station was ultimately included on the list of stations to be built in GO Expansion. In March 2018, a Metrolinx report found that the station would save them C$437 million, with introduction of express service expected to reduce the impact on riders north of Kirby.

In December 2018, an Auditor General's report found that Metrolinx improperly approved the station under political pressure from then-Minister of Transportation Steven Del Duca and recommended that the MTO conduct an independent review of the station. The report found that the station would cause ridership loss of 57,000 people in 2031. Because of this, the timing of the station's construction and opening is uncertain and the station remains unfunded as of 2022.
