= Danforth GO Station =

Railway station in Toronto, Ontario, Canada

Danforth
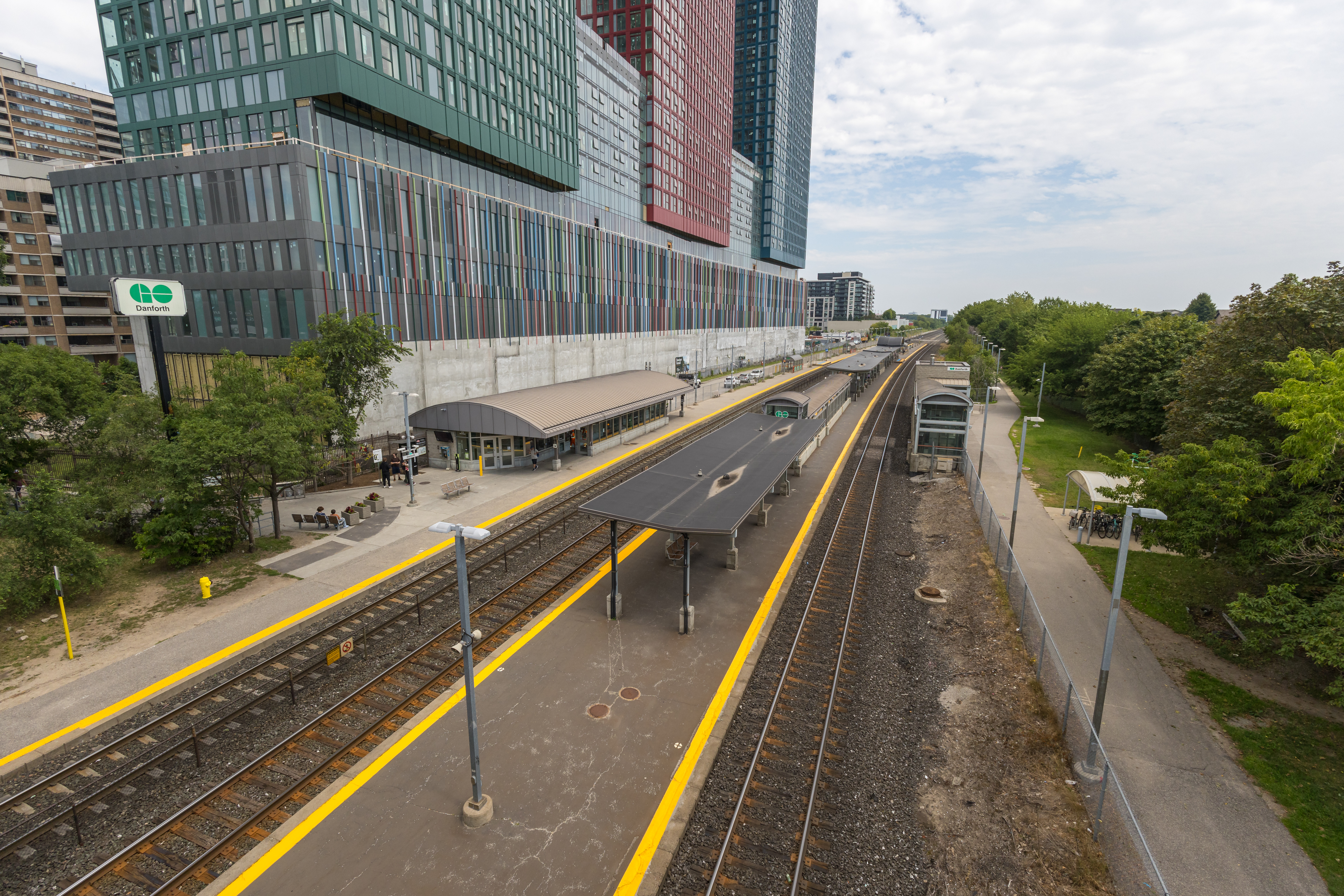
- Danforth GO Station in 2026

General information
- Location: 213 Main Street; Toronto, Ontario; Canada
- Coordinates: 43°41′12″N 79°17′57″W
- Owner: Metrolinx
- Platforms: 1 side platform, 1 island platform
- Tracks: 3
- Connections: at Main Street; 506; TTC buses

Construction
- Cycle facilities: Racks
- Accessible: Yes

Other information
- Station code: GO Transit: DA
- Fare zone: 06

History
- Opened: 1883; 143 years ago
- Rebuilt: 2001; 25 years ago
- Electrified: December 2036; 10 years' time (planned)

Passengers
- 2018: 291,000

Services
Preceding station	GO Transit	Following station
Union Terminus	Lakeshore East	Scarborough towards Oshawa
Stouffville does not stop here
Future services
Preceding station	GO Transit	Following station
East Harbour Opening 2028 towards Union	Lakeshore East (planned expansion)	Scarborough towards Bowmanville
Former services
Preceding station	Canadian National Railway	Following station
Toronto toward Sarnia	Grand Trunk Railway; Main Line	Scarboro toward Montreal
Riverdale Closed 1932 toward Sarnia	Grand Trunk Railway; Main Line	Scarboro toward Montreal
Toronto Terminus	Toronto – Belleville via Peterboro	Scarboro toward Belleville
Toronto Terminus	Toronto – Port Hope via Peterboro	Scarboro toward Port Hope
Location

Danforth GO Station is a railway station on GO Transit's Lakeshore East line in Toronto, Ontario, Canada. The station is situated in the east end of Old Toronto, south west of the intersection of Main Street and Danforth Avenue. The station is a short walk from Main Street station on Line 2 Bloor–Danforth of the Toronto subway.

== History ==
Because of a lack of available land to expand their existing downtown yard, the Grand Trunk Railway (GTR) decided to build a new freight yard on farmland south of Danforth Avenue where the line to Montreal crossed Dawes Road, which had to be closed and traffic diverted to a new street called Main. The yard had a capacity of 420 cars and could store 31 locomotives in a roundhouse with adjacent repair shops.

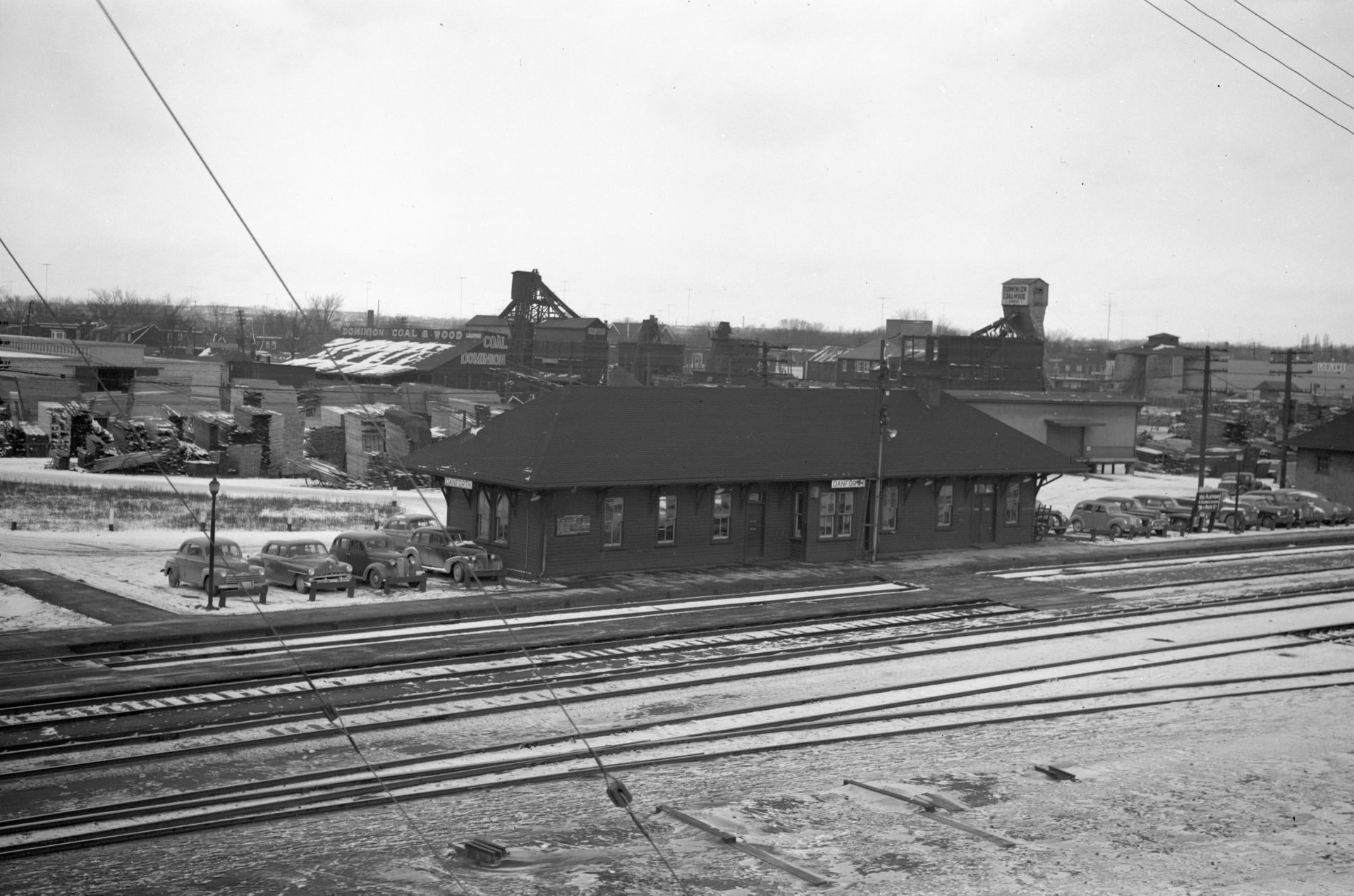
Danforth station in 1953

The York Railway Station was built on the north side of the tracks just east of Main Street around 1883. The GTR became part of Canadian National Railway in 1923, and by the 1940s the north yard was no longer used for freight and the roundhouse was demolished. The 11 freight storage tracks to the south of the station persisted until the late 1990s. Under Canadian National the station became Danforth Railway Station. The original GTR station building was demolished in 1974.

GO Transit built a ticket booth situated north of the tracks and roughly halfway between track level and the top of the Main Street Bridge. Wooden stairs provided access from both sides of the top of the Main Street Bridge, with a wooden walkway under the bridge providing access to the west side of the street. Transit stops at the top of the bridge connected Danforth Station with the TTC. Wooden stairs and walkway between the Main Street bridge and the railway signal masts connected the ticket booth to the eastbound platform. GO Transit removed the ticket booth shortly after improving accessibility to the station with a wheelchair accessible walkway and erecting a new station building with bathrooms, an indoor waiting area, elevators, and a pedestrian underpass between 2000 and 2001. The TTC removed the stops when GO Transit removed the stairways on either side of the bridge. The pedestrian underpass was further expanded to run underneath a third track installed between 2005 and 2008 to connect the station with residential areas that are to south of the station.

Main-Danforth has been identified by Metrolinx as a transportation mobility hub as it is located at the interchange of two or more current or planned regional rapid transit lines.

== Connecting transit ==
Although the 506 Carlton streetcar, 64 Main and 135 Gerrard bus routes pass on Main Street, there are no stops immediately beside the GO Station. Similarly Main Street subway station on Line 2 Bloor–Danforth is over 300 metres away, to the north of Danforth Avenue.
