= Bloor GO Station =

Railway station in Toronto, Ontario, Canada

Bloor
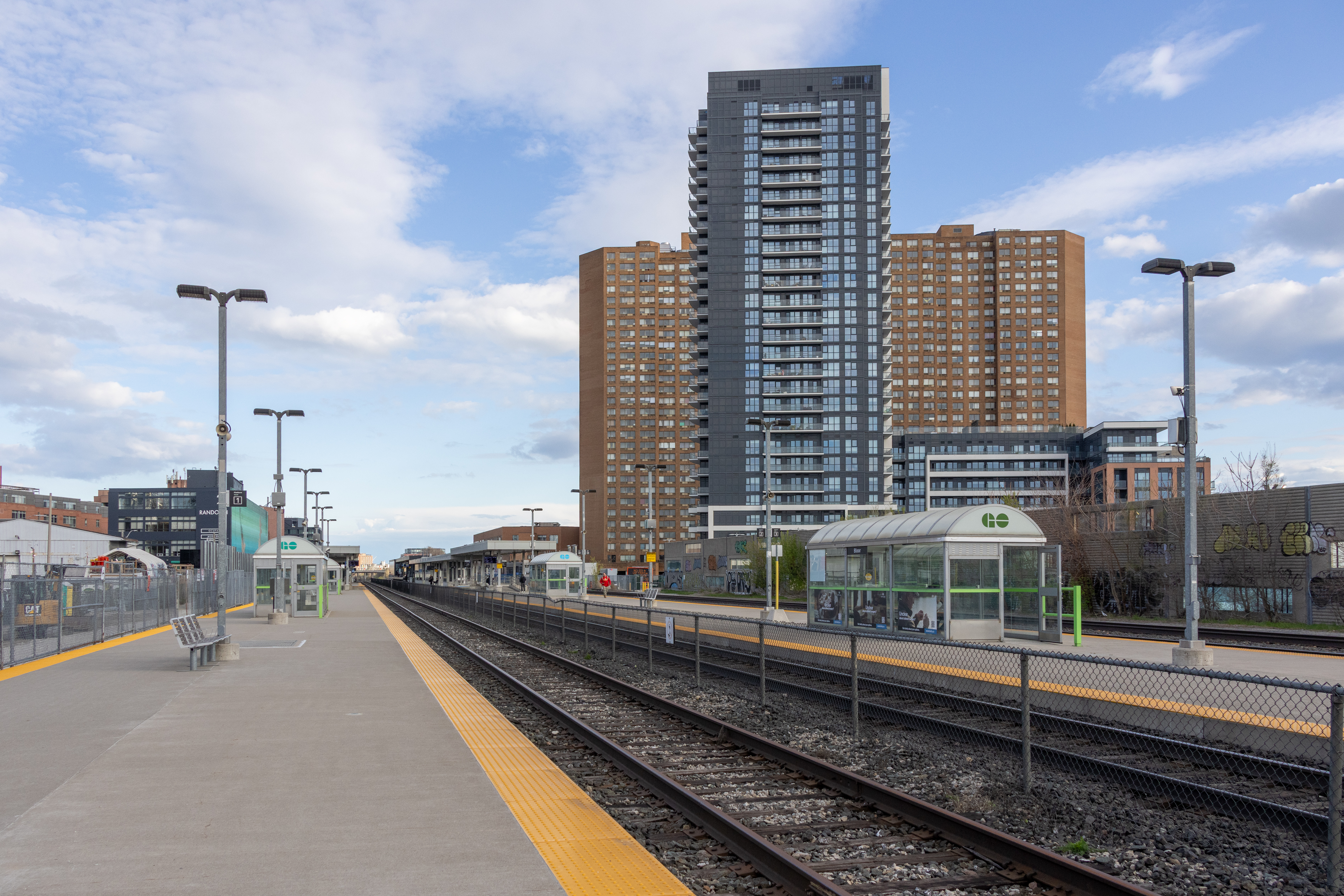

General information
- Location: 1456 Bloor Street West; Toronto, Ontario; Canada
- Coordinates: 43°39′28″N 79°27′03″W
- Owner: Metrolinx
- Platforms: 2 island platforms
- Tracks: 3 + 1 bypass
- Connections: at Dundas West

Construction
- Parking: None

Other information
- Station code: GO Transit: BL
- Fare zone: 02

History
- Opened: 1974; 52 years ago
- Rebuilt: 2015

Services
Preceding station	GO Transit	Following station
Mount Dennis towards Stratford	Kitchener	Union Terminus
Milton does not stop here
Preceding station	Metrolinx	Following station
Mount Dennis toward Pearson Airport	Union Pearson Express	Union Terminus
Future services
Preceding station	Metrolinx	Following station
Stockyards (opens 2031) toward Pearson Airport	Union Pearson Express	Union Terminus
Track layout
Location

Bloor GO Station is a railway station on GO Transit's Kitchener line and Union Pearson Express rail services, located in Toronto, Ontario, on Bloor Street east of Dundas Street West. It is near Dundas West station on the TTC's Line 2 Bloor–Danforth but is not directly connected to it.

== Overview ==
The station is located north of Bloor Street West between Lansdowne Avenue and Dundas Street West. Bloor Street dips down here to cross under all the tracks, and the station is reached by stairs from its north sidewalk.

Bloor station serves eastbound and westbound Kitchener line and UP Express trains on the Weston Subdivision, locally oriented northwest-southeast. Following the Georgetown South railway expansion in 2015, the Weston subdivision is designed to have four tracks with two island platforms, each with a high-level section for the UP Express and a low-level section for the Kitchener line. However, as of 2016, the line only has three tracks, making the easternmost platform effectively a side platform.

Parallel to these tracks, along their southwest side, is the Galt Subdivision which carries the Milton line. There is no platform for Milton line services, so those trains pass by the station without stopping. GO has considered adding the station to the Milton line, but it is not in current plans.

Until 1996 there was an additional parallel track on the northeast side of the station which belonged to the Canadian Pacific Railway and was used for access to local industries. Its former right-of-way is now used for the West Toronto Railpath, providing a pedestrian and cyclist connection to the neighbourhoods to the north, east, and south. Covered bicycle parking is located at the station's entrances from the path. Bloor is one of the few GO stations which does not have any parking for cars.

Prior to the introduction of Union Pearson Express, only 200 passengers used the station per day, a number which was expected to increase to 1,000 with the opening of the UP Express. Metrolinx is projecting 2,000 riders will use the station daily by 2031. UPX president Kathy Haley said 25 per cent of UPX riders are expected to use Bloor Station.

== Georgetown South Expansion ==
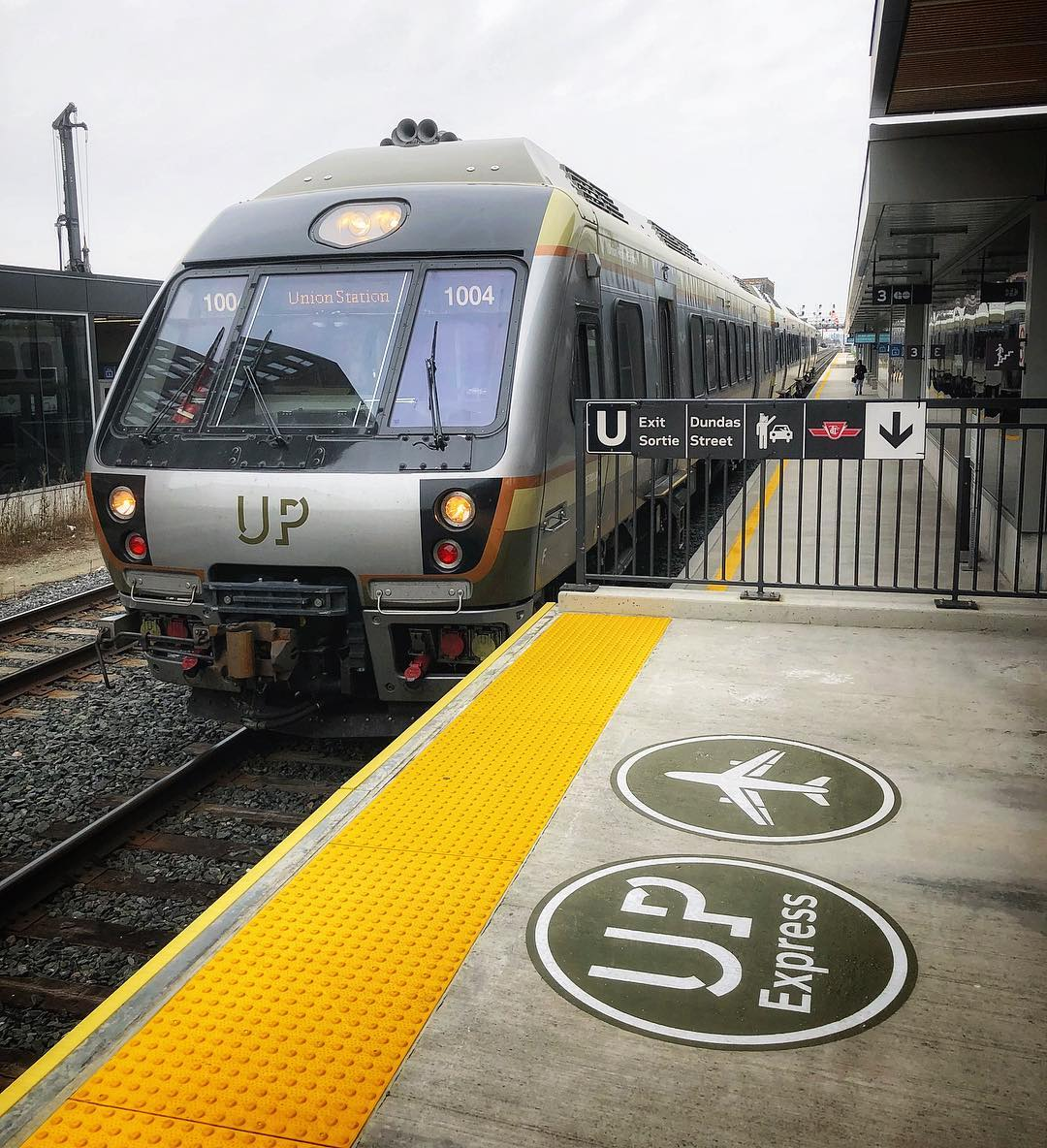
A Union Pearson Express train arriving at Bloor heading toward Union Station.

Bloor station was substantially rebuilt as a part of the Georgetown South railway expansion project to allow for Union Pearson Express service. Construction began in June 2013.

The formerly 2-track Weston Subdivision was expanded to 3 tracks, and the former side platforms became island platforms. High-level sections were added at the southeast end of each platform near Bloor street for use by the Union Pearson Express, and the low-level sections for the Kitchener line were correspondingly lengthened at the northwest end.

Other improvements to the station include an indoor concourse at street level with a staffed ticket booth, elevators, heated shelters, bicycle storage and signage.

In February 2016 a kiss-and-ride was opened at Dundas Street West and Edna Avenue, connecting to a new second entrance to the station.

== New entrances ==
Dundas West subway station has only a single entrance, on Dundas Street, so passengers connecting to Bloor station must walk eastward for some 200 metres (660 ft) along city streets. Since the subway platforms happen to extend eastward from the station entrance, a direct tunnel from the GO station to the east end of the subway station would be relatively short. In March 2011, when Metrolinx announced the station expansion plans associated with the Georgetown South Project, the second entrance to the station was to have a direct connection to the Dundas West subway platforms. In the fall of 2012, when construction began, work did not include an underground TTC connection, which was to be completed instead in 2017. However, in March 2016, Metrolinx officials said it would take five years to build a tunnel between the two stations because of the need to expropriate property.

Metrolinx began proceedings to expropriate necessary properties in September 2017. By August 2023, the contract to construct a pedestrian connection between the two stations had been awarded to Kenaidan Contracting Ltd. Construction began in May 2024. The project was delayed while Metrolinx and TTC officials negotiated with the owners of Crossways, and as of 2025, no official opening date for the tunnel has been announced.

Also, Metrolinx will construct a new entrance from Randolph Avenue that will have an entrance pavilion to access a pedestrian tunnel into the station. Construction started in July 2023. This new tunnel access opened on July 31, 2026.
