= Stouffville line =

Commuter rail service in Ontario, Canada

Stouffville
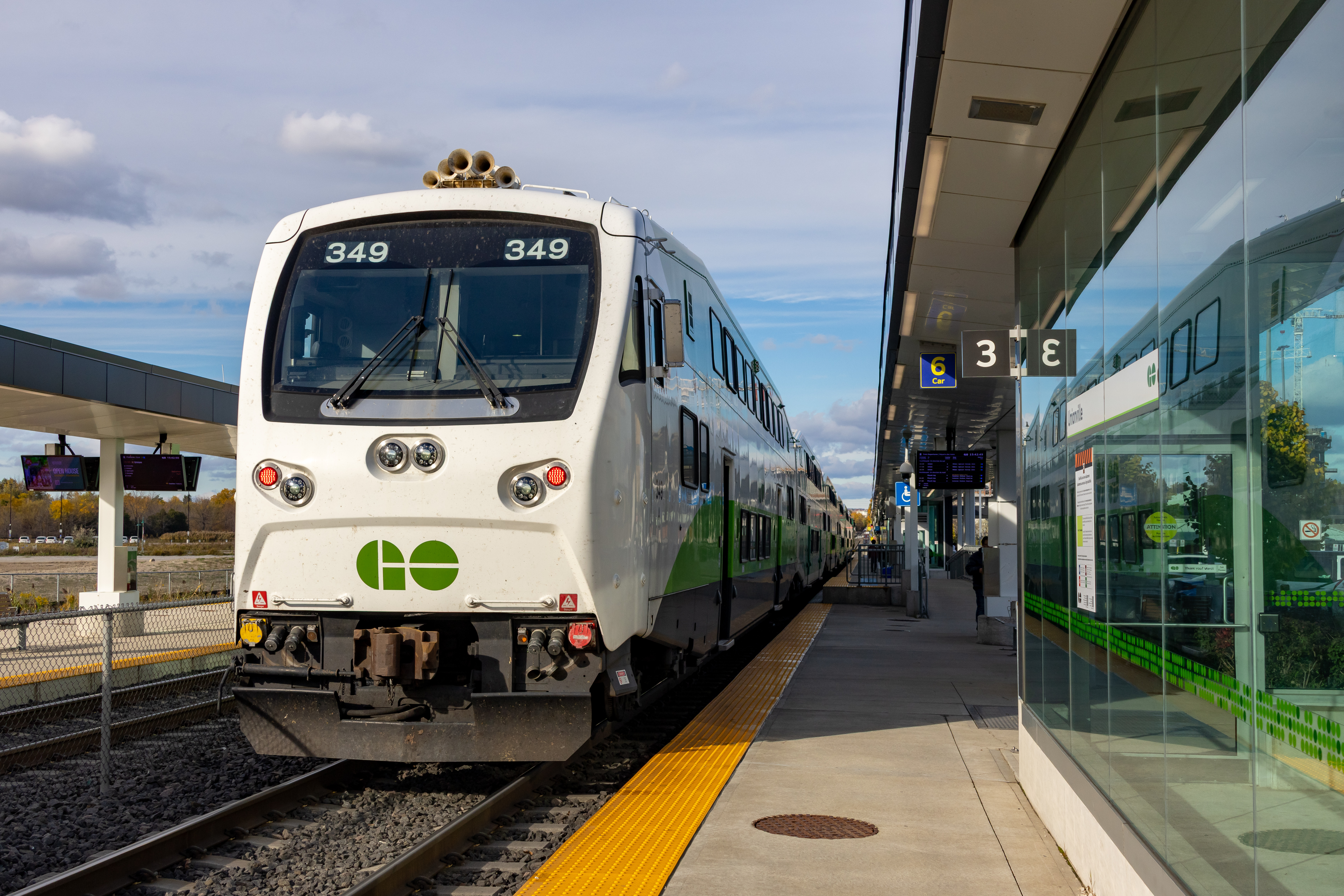
- A northbound GO train at Unionville GO Station

Overview
- Service type: Commuter rail
- System: GO Transit rail services
- Locale: Greater Toronto Area
- First service: September 7, 1982; 44 years ago
- Current operator: Alstom
- Daily ridership: 6,700 (2019)

Route
- Termini: Union; Old Elm
- Stops: 11
- Distance travelled: 49.6 km (30.8 mi)

Technical
- Rolling stock: MPI MP40PH-3C, MPI MP54AC, EMD F59PH; Bombardier BiLevel Coach
- Track gauge: 1,435 mm (4 ft 8 1/2 in) standard gauge
- Operating speed: 90 miles per hour (145 km/h) (max)
- Average length: 6–10 coaches
- Track owner: Metrolinx

Stouffville line
Overview
- Former operators: Toronto and Nipissing Railway 1868-1882, Midland Railway of Canada 1882-1884, Grand Trunk Railway 1884-1923 and Canadian National 1923-1982

The Stouffville line is one of the seven train lines of the GO Transit system in the Greater Toronto Area, Ontario, Canada. Its southern terminus is Union Station in Toronto, and its northern terminus is Old Elm (formerly "Lincolnville") in Whitchurch-Stouffville. There are connections from almost every station to Toronto Transit Commission or York Region Transit bus services.

During peak periods on weekdays, trains operate approximately twice per hour over the entire route, but in the peak direction only. Otherwise, trains operate hourly in both directions seven days a week between either Unionville or Mount Joy stations and Union, with a small number of trips covering the full line to Old Elm. GO bus routes 70 and 71 provide service in the directions, time periods, and segments not covered by train service. However, buses to and from Union Station bypass all other stations within the City of Toronto. Weekend service was operated entirely by bus until November 2, 2019, when weekend train service was introduced.

Between Union Station and Scarborough GO Station, the Stouffville line shares tracks with the Lakeshore East line. Stouffville line trains operate non-stop through the shared segment, bypassing Scarborough and Danforth stations.

== History ==
=== Early history ===
Originally laid by the Toronto and Nipissing Railway, the track came into operation in 1871. The T&N merged with the Midland Railway of Canada in 1882. Only two years later, the Grand Trunk Railway leased most of the lines in the area as part of a major expansion plan and then purchased them outright in 1893. The Grand Trunk would later merge with the Canadian National Railway (CN) in 1923. CN would provide passenger rail service on the line until the formation of Via Rail in 1977.

=== Service history ===
On September 7, 1982, VIA Rail service was discontinued and replacement service—then just a single weekday run—was started by GO Transit.

On June 29, 1998, GO Transit restored full service to the Lakeshore lines, and terminated Stouffville Line service to Danforth and Scarborough, which are shared with the Lakeshore East line.

On December 13, 2007, the government of Ontario announced funding to Metrolinx for network expansion, which included $20 million to build a second track to enable all-day two-way service between Union Station and Markham.

On September 2, 2008, the line was extended northwards from Stouffville to Old Elm. Lincolnville (now Old Elm) GO Station was built directly over GO Transit's Stouffville Yard, and so it consists of six tracks and platforms instead of the usual one or two.

On February 2, 2015, select trains began stopping at Danforth GO Station as part of a year-long pilot project to increase GO service within the City of Toronto. As of June 2017, many peak-period trains continue to stop at Danforth station, and one daily train also stops at Scarborough station. These extra stops were ended sometime before November 2021.

All-day weekday service was introduced on June 24, 2017. Trains began operating from as early as 5 a.m. to as late as 11:45 p.m. with hourly service in both directions between Unionville and Union Station during the midday and evening. Service in the counter-peak direction continued to be operated by buses.

On April 8, 2019, midday train trips were extended to Mount Joy station, and buses continued the rest of the trip from Mount Joy to Lincolnville.

On August 31, 2019, GO Transit began providing bidirectional late-evening service between Union Station and Mount Joy, hourly between 9:30 p.m. and 11:30 p.m. The final northbound trip continues past Mount Joy and arrives at Lincolnville at 12:29 a.m.

Starting on November 2, 2019, hourly two-way weekend train service between Mount Joy and Union Station began, with some morning and late night trips arriving in Lincolnville.

== Schedule ==
On weekdays, GO Transit train service on the Stouffville line consists of nine southbound train trips during the morning peak and eight northbound train trips during the afternoon/evening peak, running the entire length of the line. During regular weekday operation, the frequency of peak train service is every 30–60 minutes. During midday non-peak hours, five southbound and five northbound trips are provided between Union Station and Mount Joy. From early to late evening, three southbound and three northbound trips are provided between Union Station and Mount Joy, and during the late night, one northbound trip will depart Union Station and terminate at Old Elm. All non-peak train services are operated with a frequency level of every 60 minutes in either direction.

Bus service is provided approximately every 30 minutes in the direction opposite that of the train trips during peak hours.

Due to the COVID-19 pandemic, train service on the Stouffville line had been previously limited to three southbound trains from Old Elm to Union Station and three northbound trains from Union Station to Old Elm daily. Further reduction of train service began on June 20, 2020, with buses replacing all weekend train service.

On September 5, 2020, Metrolinx began the first step in service restoration on the Stouffville line, with all weekend train trips restored with slight schedule adjustments. On September 8, 2020, the first stage of the restoration of weekday train service commenced, which consists of five southbound trains from Old Elm to Union Station and five northbound trains from Union Station to Old Elm.

Effective January 23, 2021, as a response to diminishing customer demand caused by the ongoing coronavirus pandemic which had been increasing in severity across the province, Metrolinx removed one southbound train from Old Elm to Union Station, one northbound train from Union Station to Old Elm, and all late evening and weekend train service. All removed trains have been replaced by buses.

Metrolinx began the second step in Stouffville line service restoration on the Stouffville line on August 7, 2021. One southbound train from Old Elm to Union Station was added to the morning peak service, one northbound train from Union Station to Old Elm was removed from the evening peak service, and two late evening trains from Union Station to Old Elm was added. An additional southbound train operates out of Old Elm each morning but only provides service between Mount Joy and Union Station. Non-peak service, including weekend service, was reintroduced with the same service frequencies as prior to the COVID-19 pandemic.

On September 7, 2021, the third step of Stouffville train service restoration began. The new service levels for weekday train service match the pre-pandemic schedule more closely. Southbound morning peak service, consisting of eight train trips, is provided under a frequency level of every 30–60 minutes, starting from a 5:20 a.m. departure from Old Elm. Northbound evening peak service, consisting of five train trips, is provided under the same frequency level starting from a 3:14 p.m. departure from Union Station. All non-peak service will continue to operate between Mount Joy and Union Station, with two late-evening trips and one overnight train trip extended to Old Elm.

After the implementation of a mandatory staff vaccination policy led to staffing shortages, and in response to the highly contagious Omicron variant, service across the GO system was once again reduced starting on January 10, 2022. For Stouffville line service, this meant reverting to the schedules that took effect on August 7, 2021. Temporary service reductions were put in place on January 19, 2022, which removed most late-evening service to Mount Joy and Old Elm as well as all weekend train service. These temporary service reductions end on May 24, 2022, with the resumption of late-evening train service and the addition of one southbound train from Old Elm and one northbound train to Old Elm.

On May 28, 2022, weekend train service was reintroduced with the same service frequencies as prior to the COVID-19 pandemic.

On August 15, 2025, GO Transit introduced one new train trip between Union Station and Unionville in each direction during the afternoon rush hour in response to increased ridership as a result of the Canadian National Exhibition (CNE). These trips were later permanently added to the Stouffville line schedule. On October 27, 2025, one southbound trip from Unionville during the morning rush hour and a second northbound trip to Unionville were added.

== Route ==
The Stouffville line operates entirely over railways owned by Metrolinx. The line begins at Union Station and follows CN's Kingston Subdivision and the GO Lakeshore East line to Scarborough Junction, just east of Scarborough GO Station. It then branches north onto the Metrolinx Uxbridge Subdivision, originally the Toronto and Nipissing Railway.

=== Route description ===
From Union Station to Scarborough GO station, the Stouffville line's tracks are shared with the Kingston Subdivision and the Lakeshore East GO Transit corridor. The first station after Union Station, Danforth GO Station, is therefore shared with Lakeshore East trains. Stouffville line trains no longer serve Danforth and Scarborough stations. The Stouffville GO train switches to the Uxbridge Subdivision at Scarborough and begins curving towards the north until the Midland and Danforth Road intersection, at which point the line points straight north. The train then passes through residential neighborhoods up to Eglinton Avenue, and stops at Kennedy station, which is the terminus for the TTC's Line 2, the former Line 3, and Line 5.

As the train progresses through the route travelling adjacent to the Scarborough RT corridor in between Eglinton Avenue and Ellesmere Road, the train enters several industrial districts. Near the Kennedy station area are several industrial spurs serviced during the overnight hours by the Canadian National Railway, the former Uxbridge Sub owner. Continuing north, the train arrives at Agincourt GO station next, which is close to Sheppard Avenue.

North of Sheppard Avenue, the train passes through more residential and industrial areas. Just south of Steeles Avenue is the Milliken GO Station. Past Milliken, the train crosses Steeles Avenue and the site where the original Milliken station once stood, and enters the City of Markham, continuing north. Past Denison Street, the Stouffville train descends below 14th Avenue and the CN York Subdivision tracks before making its way back up, going beneath Highway 407 and stopping at Unionville GO Station.

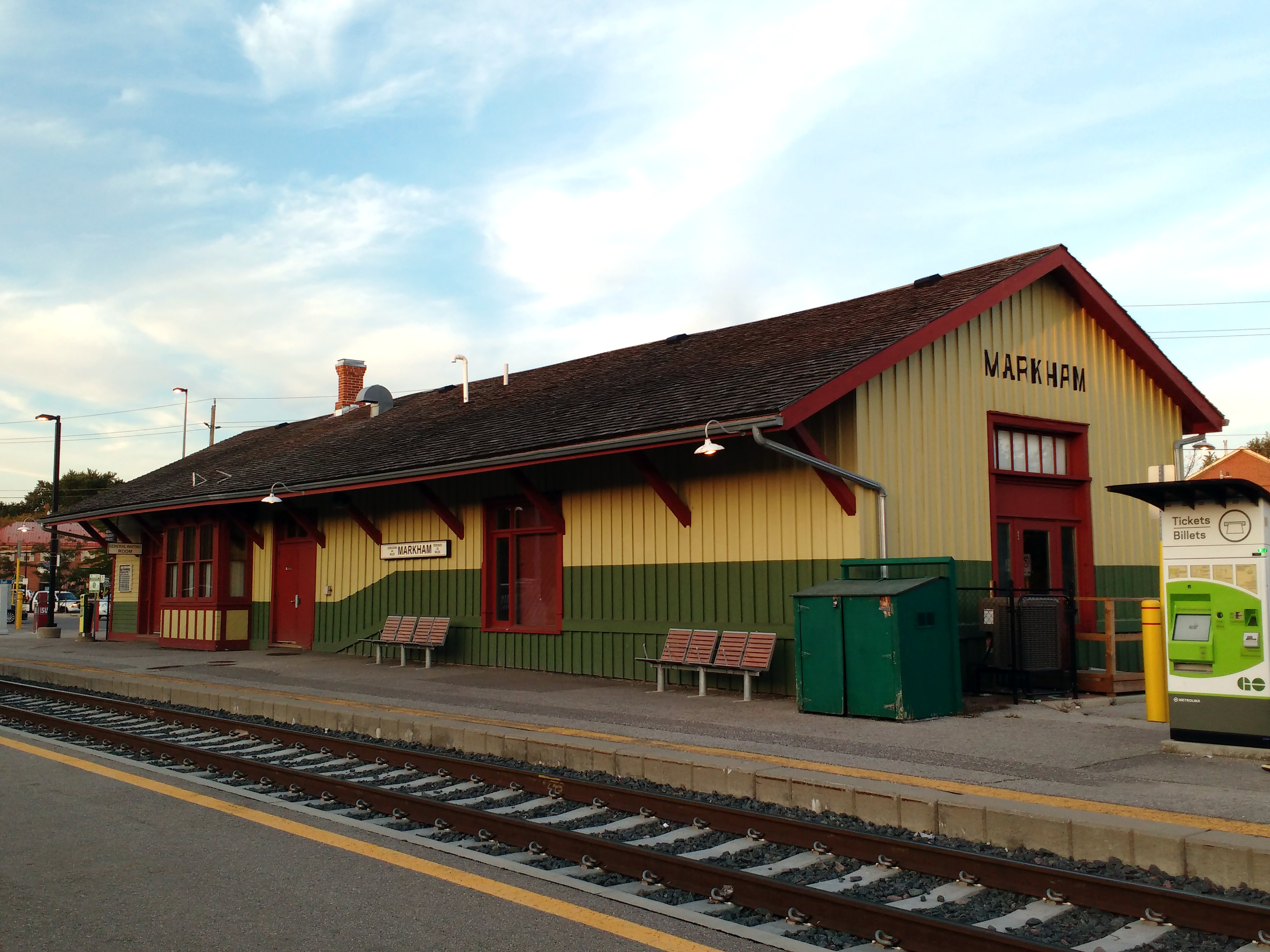
Markham GO Station building

North of Unionville GO station, the train begins curving in the east direction, passing through historic Unionville (which includes the former Unionville Station building and platform) and residential suburban neighborhoods built closer to the track before arriving at Centennial GO station. Further along the line to the east is Markham GO station, which is located in the historic Markham Village.

After Markham GO station, the line curves northward again, passing industrial areas before approaching Mount Joy GO station, now a major terminal station for all non-peak trains. As the train departs from Mount Joy GO station, the scenery becomes much more rural as the line continues north, crossing 19th Avenue, exiting Markham, and entering the Town of Whitchurch-Stouffville.

Suburban development is seen once again as the train enters the historic village of Stouffville, stopping at Stouffville GO Station. Stouffville was once a major junction that connected the Uxbridge Sub with the Lake Simcoe Junction Railway. Prior to 2020, passengers could see an abandoned track beside the main track where the trains were used to be stored. This track has since been removed.

The train continues until a little northeast, just exiting urban Stouffville, where it terminates at Old Elm GO Station, which is located just south of the line's GO Train overnight storage facility.

=== Route operation ===
The Stouffville line operates nine trains out of Old Elm every weekday and three trains every weekend in either direction. Additional services dispatched from Union run as far north as Mount Joy GO, and connecting bus services extend north to Uxbridge. Train service is provided in push pull configuration with the MPI MP40PH-3C locomotive at the north end of the train and the Bombardier BiLevel cab control car at the south. As is the case throughout the GO Transit rail system, trains are six, ten, or twelve cars long, with the fifth car from the locomotive being the door control location.

Service levels have generally been adjusted several times a year with significant cutbacks during the COVID-19 pandemic. For a much of the year in 2022 until September, off-peak service was suspended to allow for construction.

As of September 2023, on regular service days (excluding weekends and holidays), the first southbound train departs Old Elm at 5:14 a.m. The rest of the trains follow at a service frequency of 30–60 minutes with most frequent service taking place during rush hour. The last southbound train departs Old Elm at 9:17 a.m. The first northbound train departs Union Station at 9:12 a.m. These mid-day trains turn back at Mount Joy, providing two-way service at 1 hour intervals until evening rush hour for the majority of stations on the line. North bound trains have a service frequency of 30–60 minutes with most frequent service taking place during rush hour. The last northbound train does not depart Union Station until 7:12 p.m.

As of November 2, 2019, the Stouffville line operated on all weekends and holidays with three trains departing hourly from Old Elm starting from 7:14 a.m. and three trains departing hourly from Union Station starting from 10:15 a.m. All non-peak and most weekend/holiday service is provided by buses. Weekend service was cut in early 2023, but resumed with 11 daily trips in each direction in September 2023

=== Train whistle cessation agreement ===
As of December 23, 2021, the entire length of the GO Transit Stouffville line (except for one crossing at the Markham/Stouffville border, three crossings in the Town of Whitchurch-Stouffville, and one crossing in the City of Toronto) has train anti-whistling procedures implemented as the result of public outcry regarding the level of noise to which some residents were introduced as a result of the provision of increased rail service along the line. The Canadian Rail Operating Rules currently requires trains to begin blowing train whistle warning signals a quarter mile from every railroad crossing and continue to do so until the train enters the crossing as a warning to motorists and pedestrians that the train is fast approaching. The 24/7 whistle ban prohibits train engineers operating on the line from performing this warning signal.

Every city served by the line had to apply to Transport Canada individually in order to stop whistling. The railroad authority Metrolinx worked closely with these cities to implement whistle cessation as quickly as possible provided that all safety requirements are met. To impose a ban on train whistle usage at railroad crossings, several safety upgrades had to be installed at each crossing in order to receive approval from Transport Canada. These safety measures include flashing lights, bells, and gates, signs warning the public that trains will arrive without additional warning, and removal of trees to increase sighting distance.

Even when train whistling at level crossings is prohibited, there are other requirements in the Canadian Rail Operating Rules which require trains to whistle, such as when encountering a crew of track maintenance workers on or near the railroad right-of-way. As anti-whistling does not extend to these factors, residents living in close proximity to the line may still hear the whistle from time to time.

It should also be understood that the elimination of train whistling at public level crossings causes an increase in liability against the city where a train accident causing injury, permanent disability, or death occurs. As it is a well-established fact that whistle bans will increase both the frequency and severity of accidents, the city where such an accident occurs would have to assume liability to which it otherwise would not be exposed.

== Stations ==
Station	Community	Municipality	Distance (km)	Connections	Notes
Old Elm	Lincolnville	Whitchurch-Stouffville	49.6	GO Transit GO Transit bus services	The original station was constructed over GO's Stouffville Yard. The rebuilt station is located just south of this yard. Renamed from Lincolnville in 2021.
Stouffville	Stouffville	Whitchurch-Stouffville	46.8	YRT	
Mount Joy	Mount Joy/ Greensborough	Markham	38.7	TTC; YRT	
Markham	Markham Village	Markham	36.7	TTC; YRT	Cannot fit 10- and 12-car trains due to platform restrictions
Centennial	Raymerville – Markville East	Markham	35.0	TTC; YRT	
Unionville	Unionville/ Downtown Markham	Markham	30.6	GO Transit GO Transit bus services Viva Purple	
Milliken	Milliken	Toronto-Markham boundary	27.4	TTC; YRT	
Finch–Kennedy	Milliken	Toronto		TTC	Station proposed as part of SmartTrack
Agincourt	Agincourt	Toronto	22.9	TTC	
Kennedy	Ionview	Toronto	16.4	TTC	
Union	Downtown Toronto	Toronto	0.0	TTC	

== Expansion ==
In June 2013, GO Transit held a first "Public Information Centre" of an environmental assessment study for expanding rail service in the Stouffville Corridor. This represented the completion of the second of five stages of work to implement expanded service, and recommended adding double track segments and other improvements between Union Station and Unionville to support increased train service levels.

Double tracking of the line from Unionville GO station to Scarborough GO was scheduled to begin in 2015. This section is proposed to become part of SmartTrack, a proposal by Toronto mayor John Tory to improve commuter rail service within the City of Toronto.

On April 16, 2015, the Ontario government announced a Metrolinx initiative to increase rail service throughout the GO Transit network over the subsequent decade, known as Regional Express Rail (RER). Under the plan, diesel trains would operate on the Stouffville line every 20 minutes from Old Elm to Union Station during peak periods, and hourly or more frequently from Mount Joy to Union Station. In addition, electric trains would operate every 15 minutes between Unionville and Union Station.

In June 2015, new stations were approved in Toronto at Finch Avenue East and Lawrence Avenue East, to be built alongside the RER electrification.

In February 2020, Metrolinx hosted a series of Public Information Centres detailing planned expansion and future service levels. On the line, peak direction service from Old Elm will be increased to every 20 minutes, with hourly reverse direction service to Mount Joy. There would also be 7 1/2-minute bi-directional service from Union Station to Unionville. During off-peak times, trains will run in both directions every 10 minutes to Unionville and every 30 minutes to Mount Joy.

There are long-term plans to extend service beyond Old Elm to Uxbridge, over tracks already owned by GO Transit. Until such an expansion, Uxbridge is served by a GO bus stop at Uxbridge station, and the only rail service north of Old Elm used to be the York–Durham Heritage Railway, which permanently closed in 2024 due to bankruptcy.

=== Grade separation ===
A key component to GO service expansion on the Stouffville line is grade separation. Grade separation is the building of underpasses or overpasses to separate road traffic from rail traffic by eliminating level crossings. Grade separation is one of the infrastructure improvements required to be completed in preparation for the GO Transit Expansion Program. There are several benefits of grade separation, the main one being that vehicles no longer have to stop for trains. By eliminating traffic conflicts, vehicular traffic flow through busy streets is improved once trains become much more frequent. A less important but still noteworthy benefit is that grade separation is the only solution that effectively removes the need for train whistling without compromising public safety.

As of July 26, 2023, the Steeles Avenue East grade separation has completed construction. In the near future, six more grade crossings will be grade separated: four in Toronto and two in Markham (right of way acquired for overpass with extension of Donald Cousens Parkway north of Major Mackenzie to terminate at Highway 48 deferred to 2026). There is also another crossing in Toronto that is included in this project that will be closed instead of grade separated since it runs through the middle of a residential neighborhood and underpass or overpass construction is infeasible.
