= Hamilton Street Railway =

Public transit agency in Hamilton, Ontario, Canada

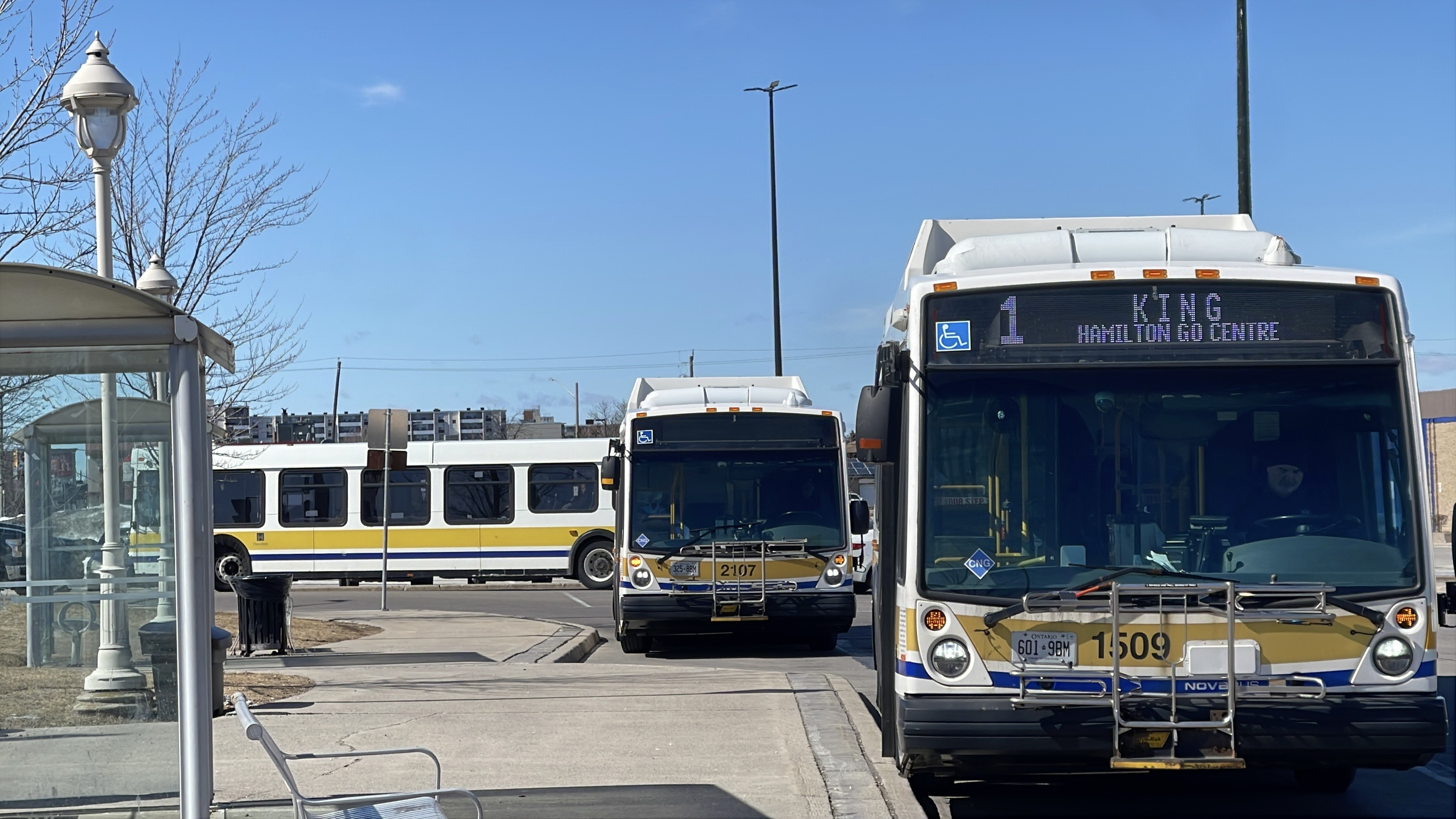
- Two NovaBus LFS CNG units #1509 & #2107 on Route 1 at the Eastgate Square Terminal.
- Founded: March 29, 1873
- Headquarters: Mountain Transit Centre; 2200 Upper James Street, Hamilton, Ontario
- Locale: Hamilton, Ontario, Canada
- Service area: Hamilton; Burlington
- Service type: Public transit Rapid transit (planned)
- Routes: 43; +2 (seasonal)
- Stops: 2,324
- Depots: 2
- Fleet: 267 buses (2021)
- Annual ridership: 15,216,234 (2022)
- Fuel type: ULSD, CNG, RNG
- Operator: City of Hamilton
- Website: www.hamilton.ca/home-neighbourhood/hsr

The Hamilton Street Railway (HSR) is the public transport agency for Hamilton, Ontario, Canada. The name is a legacy of the company's early period, when public transit in Hamilton was primarily served by streetcars. Although streetcars are no longer used in the city today, the HSR operates bus and paratransit services, with a ridership of 21 million passengers a year.

== History ==
External maps
- HSR 1930 routes
- HSR 1950 routes
- Trolley bus overhead 1959

=== Ownership ===
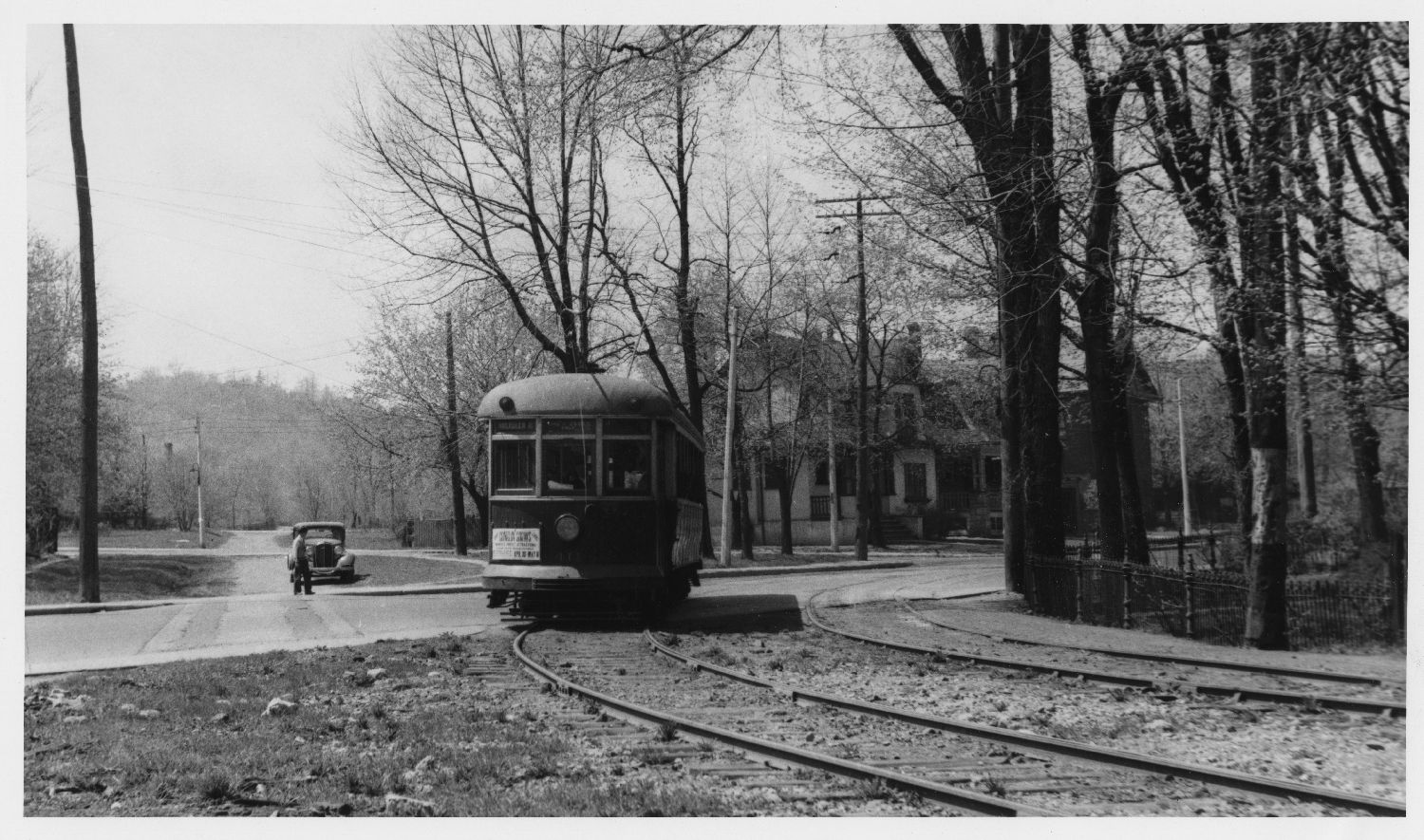
A streetcar of the Hamilton Street Railway at Queen Street and Aberdeen Avenue

On March 29, 1873, the HSR was established after Ontario passed An Act to incorporate "The Hamilton Street Railway Company." It was owned by Lyman Moore and operated as a private business under a city franchise. In 1899, HSR was bought out by the Hamilton Cataract, Power, Light and Traction Company, later known as Dominion Power and Transmission Company. In April 1930, HSR was acquired by Ontario Hydro. Provincial ownership ended in 1946 when HSR became a subsidiary of Canada Coach Lines. Through a corporate reorganization in 1954, CCL became a subsidiary of HSR. HSR and CCL were purchased by the city of Hamilton in 1960. CCL was sold to Trentway-Wagar in 1993. In 1977, the Hamilton-Wentworth Region assumed ownership of HSR. In 2001, regional amalgamation placed ownership back with the city of Hamilton.

=== Former streetcar system ===
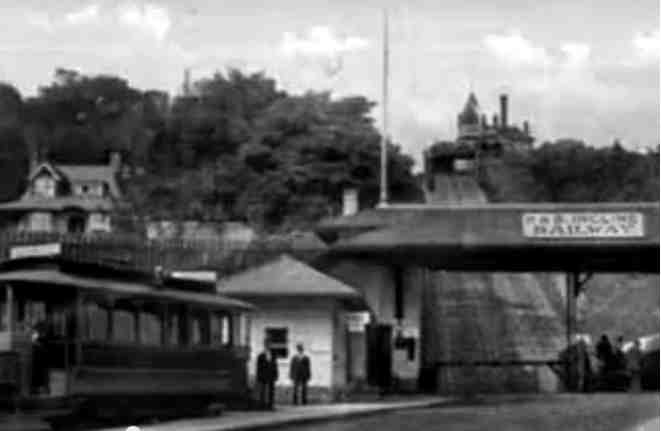
Streetcars of the Hamilton Street Railway could exchange passengers with a funicular up Hamilton Mountain.

The HSR operated horsecars from 1874 to 1892. In May 1874, the first horsecar ran south on James Street, then east on King Street to Wellington Street, a distance of 4.8 kilometres (3 mi). At the end of horsecar operation, there were 5 horsecar routes, 19 kilometres (12 mi) of track, 45 horsecars, 9 sleighs and 160 horses. Fifteen of the horsecars would be converted into electric streetcars. The horsecar system had three barns: North Barn at Stuart and Bay Streets, East Barn at Sanford Avenue and King Street (built 1890) and South Barn at Herkimer and Locke Streets (built 1891). These three locations would continue to be used after electrification. On June 29, 1892, the first electric streetcars went into operation.

In 1895, York Street was mostly double-tracked. In 1896, the first streetcar loop was constructed at Guise Street at the north end of James Street. In 1904, HSR provided rush-hour service north from Barton Street over the tracks of the Hamilton Radial Electric Railway (HRER) along Birch Avenue. In 1907, the 2.3-kilometre (1.4 mi), single-track, side-of-road Bartonville line was built east from Sherman Avenue along King Street East to Strongman Road. Barton Street was double-tracked in 1911. Tracks were extended east along Burlington Street from James Street (1910 and 1913), linking to the double-track HRER line at Birch Avenue. By 1916, tracks had been extended east on Barton Street, north and south on Kennilworth Avenue and west on Main Street; an enlarged Belt Line was created in October 1916 using the new double track and became the city's busiest streetcar line. By 1923, the tracks had been extended west along King Street to Cline Avenue in Westdale. After the Hamilton and Dundas Street Railway ceased operation in 1923, HSR took over a portion of its line along Aberdeen Avenue to Longwood Road.

In 1908, the South Barn was destroyed by fire after which the site continued to be used for streetcar storage. In 1910, the Sanford Barn was opened near north-west corner of King and Sanford Streets, across the street from the East Barn. In 1928, new shops were opened near the East Barn to maintain streetcars and interurban cars. In 1929, the North Barn closed.

The HSR had a mixed fleet of single-end and double-end streetcars. Single-end streetcars were used on the Belt Line where no loops were required. In 1927, turning loops were added at the outer ends of the Aberdeen and Westdale lines.

Bus service was introduced in 1926 along Cannon Street. The first contraction of the streetcar system was the closure of the single-track line to Bartonville, replaced by buses in 1929. The first major streetcar abandonment was along York Street on 1939.

By 1940, the HSR operated the following seven routes:

Route	Length	Description
Belt Line	12.59 kilometres (7.82 mi)	circular route via Barton, Kennilworth, Main, Sherwood, King, James
Burlington-James South	12.23 kilometres (7.60 mi)	
Westdale-James North	6.89 kilometres (4.28 mi)	
Aberdeen-King West	6.45 kilometres (4.01 mi)	
Wentworth	2.66 kilometres (1.65 mi)	
Crosstown	2.70 kilometres (1.68 mi)	via Birch, Wilson, Sanford
Incline	1.50 kilometres (0.93 mi)	James Street South to foot of Hamilton Mountain

After Canada Coach Lines purchased HSR in 1946, it announced the abandonment of streetcar service. Consequently, service was abandoned on Aberdeen Avenue in 1947, to Westdale in 1949 and on Burlington Street in 1950. The final abandonment was the Belt Line with April 5, 1951 being its last day of service, but with a ceremonial last run on the following day.

=== Former interurban lines ===
Hamilton had four interurban lines originating from downtown Hamilton. These lines were not part of the HSR but for many of their years of operation had the same parent company, Dominion Power and Transmission Company. In order to access downtown Hamilton, the interurbans shared some trackage with the HSR.

From 1907, interurban cars ran out of a Hamilton Terminal Station located between Main and King Streets East at Catherine Street. The passenger terminal with several tracks was east of Catherine Street and a two-track interurban freight station was on that street's west side. In 1924, buses of Dominion Power subsidiaries started using the terminal, but loaded on Main Street. After interurbans were abandoned in 1931, the passenger station was renovated for buses. The station closed in 1955, and was later demolished. Today, its site is occupied by Terminal Towers.

Hamilton-area interurban lines from 1873 to 1931
- 1873–1923: Hamilton and Dundas Street Railway
- 1891–1931: Hamilton, Grimsby and Beamsville Electric Railway
- 1893–1929: Hamilton Radial Electric Railway
- 1896–1931: Brantford and Hamilton Electric Railway

=== Former trolley bus system ===
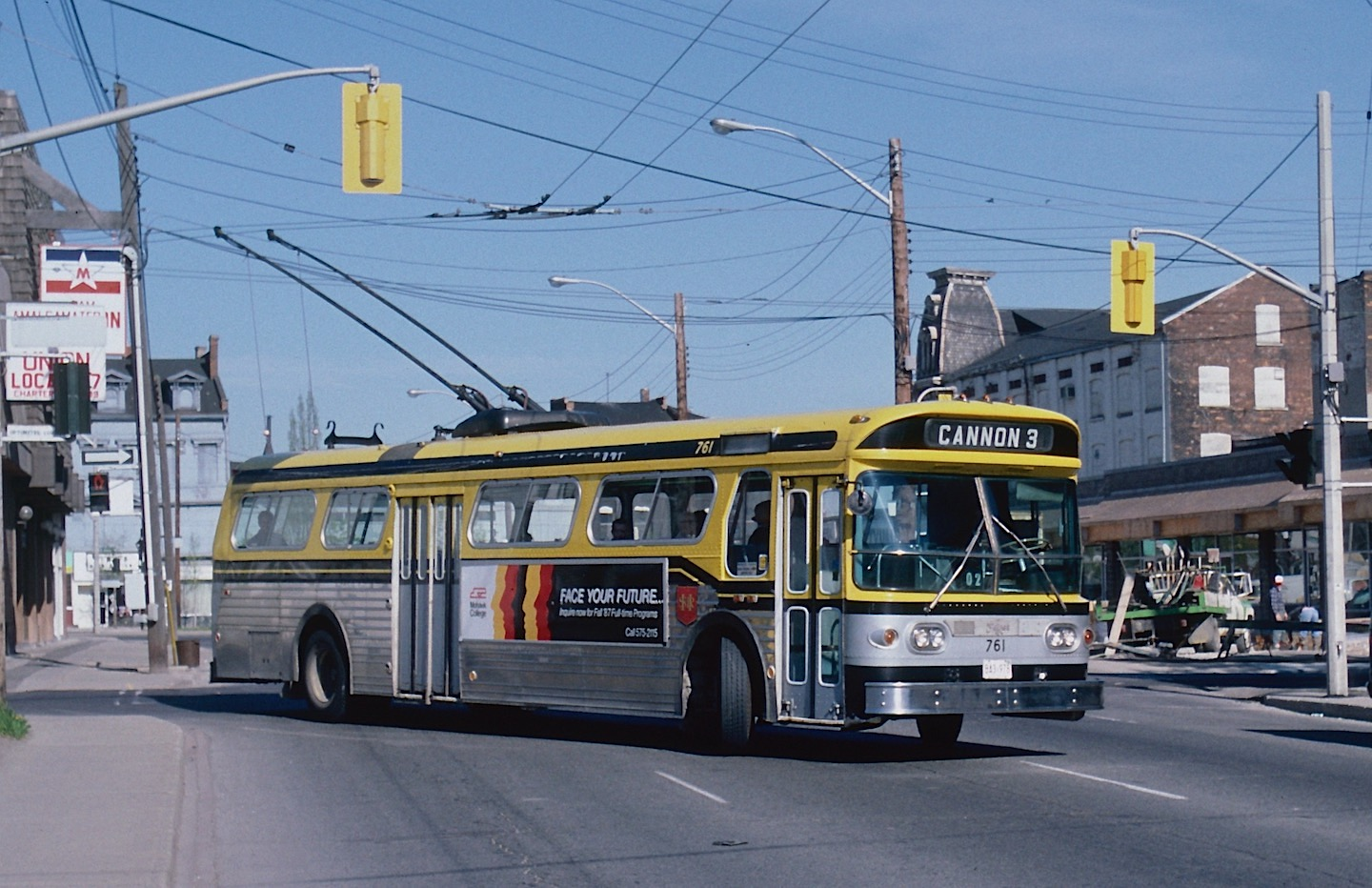
A Flyer E700 trolley bus on Wilson Street in 1987

Trolley buses were used by the HSR from 1950 to 1992. The trolley bus system opened on December 10, 1950, and the last day of trolley bus service was December 30, 1992.

On December 10, 1950, the first Hamilton trolley buses went into service on the 6.6-kilometre (4.1 mi) Cannon route, replacing a busy bus route. In October 1951, several months after the termination of streetcar service, a second trolley bus route went into service as the 13.8-kilometre (8.6 mi) King-Barton route. In 1956, the city introduced one-way streets in downtown Hamilton; as a result, the King-Barton route was split into the separate King and Barton routes. Trolley bus operation was eventually extended as far east as Stoney Creek, almost to Donn Avenue. Trolley buses operated out of the Sanford facility which used to handle streetcars. Originally designated only by names, as in streetcar days, the three routes were later given numbers, 1 for the King route, 2 for Barton, and 3 for the Cannon route. The fleet originally consisted of 50 Canadian Car–Brill vehicles, which by 1973 were replaced by 40 Flyer E700 trolley buses built in 1972–73. Sixteen Flyer E800A vehicles were added in 1978–79. All 56 Flyer trolley buses used some electrical components, such as motors, from retired Brill trolley buses, but that in the E800s came not from HSR Brills but from Brills of the Thunder Bay trolley bus system (closed in 1972), purchased by HSR for the parts.

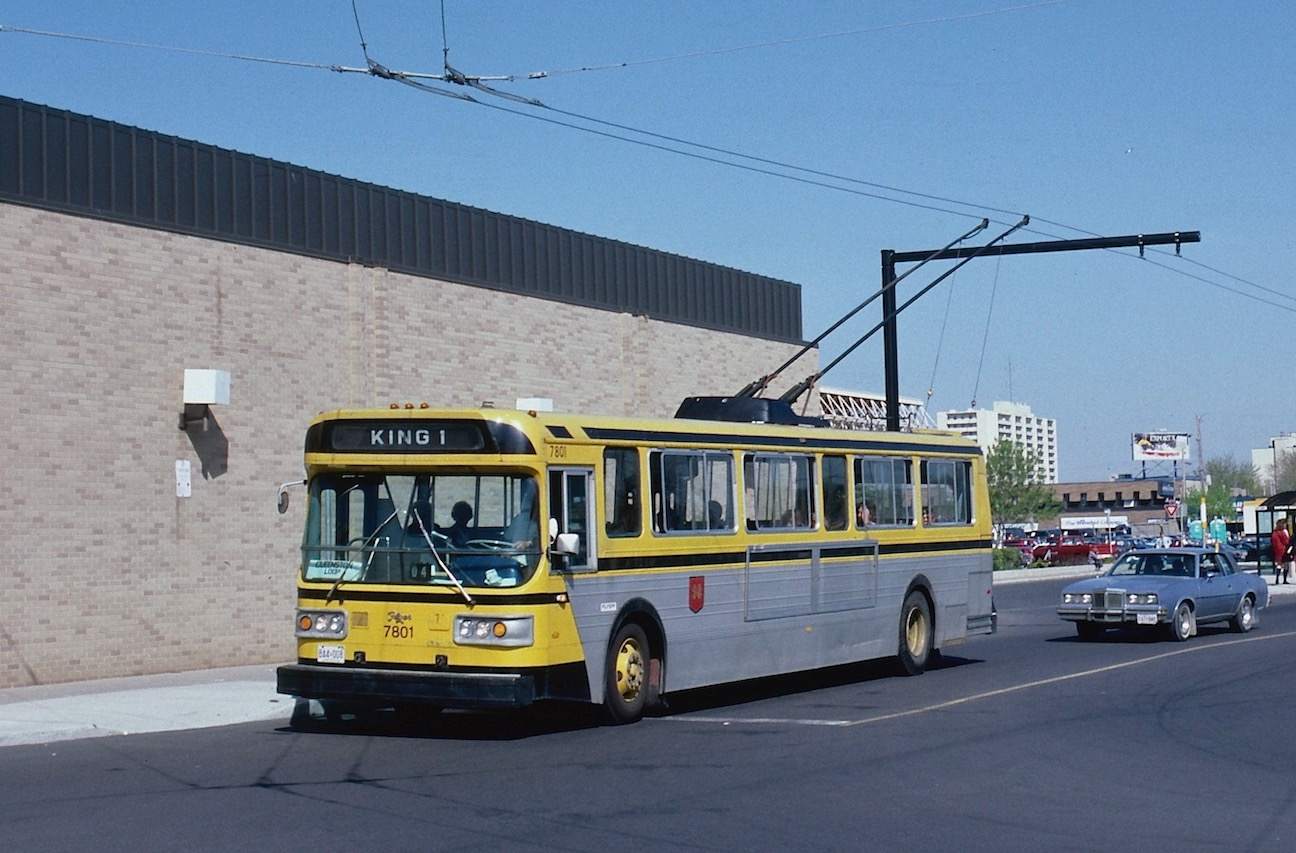
One of the E800 trolley buses using the overhead wires that opened at Eastgate Square mall in 1986

In the mid-1980s, the older Flyer trolley buses were nearing the end of their useful life, given that their electrical equipment had been recycled from 1950 trolley buses. HSR noted that new diesel buses were cheaper to buy than new trolley buses. However, in November 1986, the city council and Hamilton–Wentworth Regional Council both voted in favour of retaining trolley bus operation and endorsing buying new trolley buses, and small investments in new infrastructure were still being made, such as the construction of a new turnaround loop for trolley buses at Eastgate Square mall, which came into use in September 1986. However, temporary substitutions of diesel buses for trolley buses became increasingly common in the late 1980s. Diesel buses temporarily replaced trolley buses on routes 1–King and 3-Cannon in May 1989 because of road construction projects, with trolley buses returning to both routes in November 1989. However, both routes were again dieselized in early January 1990 for what would ultimately be the last time. Only route 2–Barton then remained in operation with trolley buses.

At the time the King and Cannon routes were dieselized, the city moved trolley bus operations to a new bus garage at 330 Wentworth Street North which did not have trolley wires. This was possible because all but one of HSR's 16 newer trolley buses (model E800A) had been retrofitted in 1989–90 with a small auxiliary diesel engine for off-wire movements. The last day for trolley bus operation on the Barton route was December 30, 1992, when only a single trolley bus (No. 7815) was in service. At the time, the regional council was still planning to purchase new trolleybuses for routes 1 and 2, and HSR issued a draft specification for new trolley buses in April 1993, and subsequently, considered purchasing or leasing 40 trolley buses from the Edmonton trolley bus system that had been on loan to the Toronto Transit Commission since 1989–90 and were in storage in Toronto after the 1993 closure of the trolley bus system there. However, after HSR concluded that the Edmonton vehicles would require costly modifications for Hamilton, the regional council voted on March 1, 1994 to make the system's closure permanent.

=== Barns/garages ===
Name	Operated	Location	Usage
North Barn	1875–1929	Stuart St & Bay St	Horsecars, later streetcars
East Barn	1890–1928	Sanford Ave & King St, SW corner	Horsecars, later streetcars
South Barn	1891–1908	Herkimer St & Locke St	Horsecars, later streetcars
Sanford Yard & Shops	1910–1990	King St & Sanford Ave, NW corner	Streetcars, later buses including trolley buses; shops added 1928
Mountain Transit Centre	1984–present	2200 Upper James St	Buses
Wentworth Street Transit Centre	1990–2000	330 Wentworth St N	Buses, including off-wire trolley buses
Birch Transit Centre	2026–present	281 Birch Avenue	Buses

In June 2026, Birch Transit Centre opened on the site of the former Wentworth Street Transit Centre. The garage holds 200 natural-gas buses and has 30 repair bays, a bus wash facility and offices. In January 2023, HSR posted bid documents; it hoped to open the new facility in 2024 to supplement the overcrowded Mountain Transit Centre. As of early 2025, this timeline had shifted to late 2026 completion.

== Services ==
=== Bus routes ===
Most bus routes in Hamilton operate all of the week, from early morning to late at a night, or past midnight. Headways mostly range from between 6 and 40 minutes, and most routes being 20 minutes or better on weekdays, usually between 12 and 20 minutes frequencies, depending on time of day.

On weekends, frequencies are reduced, and service on some routes are unavailable on holidays.

There are some special bus routes that only operate during certains times of year, enter Burlington, or otherwise operate in different ways from the majority of routes.

No.	Name	Inner Terminal	Outer Terminal	Notes
1	King	Eastgate Square	Hamilton GO Centre	Sunday service no longer extends to Fiesta Mall as of September 2023.
1A	King	Eastgate Square	West Hamilton Loop via McMaster University	Weekday service only. Services McMaster University.
2	Barton	Hamilton GO Centre	Bell Manor Loop	
3	Cannon	Hamilton GO Centre	Reid & Dunsmure	
4	Bayfront	Downtown (James at Main)	Mt. Albion Loop	Majority weekday services serve Ferrie Ave, except for certain night-trips.
5	Delaware (Stoney Creek/Dundas)	King at Highway 8 via Downtown Stoney Creek	Head Street via Downtown Dundas	East end extended to King at Highway 8 after retirement of route 58 Stoney Creek Local
5A	Delaware (Rosedale/Ancaster)	Greenhill at Cochrane via McMaster University	Meadowlands Terminal via McMaster University	Due to route numbering changes, route 5A is bidirectional as of September 2023. Route numbering 5C was discontinued.
5B	Delaware (Greenhill/Dundas)	Mt. Albion Loop via Greenhill	Pirie at Governers via Governers	Due to route numbering changes, route 5B is bidirectional as of September 2023. Route numbering 5E was discontinued.
6	Aberdeen	Downtown (James at King William)	Princess Point Loop	
7	Locke	Downtown (James at King William)	Hillcrest Loop	
8	York	Downtown (James at Main)	Strathcona Loop	
9	Rock Gardens	Downtown (James at Main)	Woodland and Holy Sepulchre Cemeteries	Service operates on Sundays and holidays from May through November. Travels to Burlington.
10	B-Line Express	Eastgate Square	University Plaza	Now has 7 day a week daytime & early evening express service as of September 2023. Most weekday trips interlined with 55/55A Stoney Creek Central.
11	Parkdale	Valley Park Loop	Burlington Bus Terminal	Only daily route that travels to Burlington. Does not serve Downtown. Weekday Trips service Canada Centre for Inland Waters
12	Wentworth	Wentworth and Burton	Victoria and King	Counterclockwise loop. Route only operates on weekdays during AM and PM peak hours.
16	Ancaster	Meadowlands Terminal	Garner at Wilson	Sunday Service introduced in 2024. Separate AM & PM Routing. Interlined with 43 Stone Church
18	Waterdown Mountaineer	Waterdown Walmart	Aldershot GO Station	Late-night and Sunday service introduced in 2024. End of line returned to Walmart in Fall 2026.
20	A-Line Express	Waterfront at Pier 8 via Mohawk College	Hamilton International Airport via Mohawk College	Serves Mohawk College, Mountain Transit Centre Park & Ride and Amazon Fulfillment Centre.
21	Upper Kenilworth	Frank A. Cooke Terminal	Heritage Greene Terminal	Services Mohawk College.
22	Upper Ottawa	Frank A. Cooke Terminal	Upper Ottawa & Rymal	Serves Red Hill Business Park.
23	Upper Gage	Frank A. Cooke Terminal	Upper Gage & Rymal	Interlined with 24 Upper Sherman
24	Upper Sherman	Frank A. Cooke Terminal	Upper Gage & Rymal	Interlined with 23 Upper Gage. Routing via St Jean de Brebeuf School cancelled 2014.
25	Upper Wentworth	Frank A. Cooke Terminal	Lime Ridge Mall	Interlined with 26 Upper Wellington
26	Upper Wellington	Frank A. Cooke Terminal	Lime Ridge Mall	Interlined with 25 Upper Wentworth
27	Upper James	Frank A. Cooke Terminal	Mountain Transit Centre via Amazon Fulfillment Centre	Serves Mountain Transit Centre Park & Ride and Amazon Fulfillment Centre. Interlined with 35 College on weekdays at Frank A. Cooke Terminal.
33	Sanatorium	Frank A. Cooke Terminal	Scenic and Lavender Loop	Routing through Chedoke Arena cancelled 2014. Serves Mohawk College.
34	Upper Paradise	Downtown (Main and MacNab)	Glancaster Loop	Some late night trips service both Upper Horning and Glancaster Loops.
34A	Upper Paradise	Downtown (Main and MacNab)	Upper Horning Loop	
35	College	Frank A. Cooke Terminal	St. Elizabeth Village	Alternating routing via Garth and via Upper James. Serves Mohawk College. Interlined with 27 Upper James on weekdays at Frank A. Cooke Terminal.
41	Mohawk	Meadowlands Terminal	Industrial & Depew	Alternating Routing via Ottawa & Kenilworth. Services Lime Ridge Mall. No longer services Chedoke Hospital as of September 2023
42	Mohawk East	Lime Ridge Mall	Mohawk 4 Ice Centre	Operates on Saturdays only. Formerly the Mohawk East Extra.
43	Stone Church	Meadowlands Terminal	Valley Park Loop via Saltfleet School	7-day a week service from 6AM–midnight began Aug. 31, 2014. Services Lime Ridge Mall. Interlined with 16 Ancaster.
44	Rymal	Confederation GO Station	Ancaster Business Park	Serves Eastgate Square and Heritage Greene Terminal.
51	University	Hamilton GO Centre	West Hamilton Loop via McMaster University	Serves McMaster University. Service from September to April.
52	Dundas Local	York and Watson's Loop	Pleasant at Orchard	Service operates every 40 minutes, 7 days a week, from at least 6 AM-midnight, including holidays, as of August 31st, 2025 .
55	Stoney Creek Central	Eastgate Square	Winona Crossing	Interlined with 10 B-Line Express on weekdays.
55A	Stoney Creek Central	Eastgate Square	Jones at Highway 8 via Barton and Glover	Interlined with 10 B-Line Express on weekdays. Services Mohawk College Stoney Creek Campus.
56	Centennial	Eastgate Square	Lakeland Loop	Daily service during summer, weekend and holiday service during spring and fall, and no service during winter. Services Confederation Walmart. Also serves Wild Waterworks during the summer.
99	Waterfront Shuttle	Downtown (King and MacNab)	Bayfront Park	Summer-only service 7 days a week. Free to ride.
X-IND	Stoney Creek Industrial Extra	Eastgate Square	Lewis and Barton	Weekday service only, operates 5 times per direction during the AM and PM rush hour

=== Trans-Cab ===
Introduced in 1998 as a two-year pilot project, Trans-Cab is a shared-ride taxi service between HSR and Blue Line Taxi, currently offered in portions of Glanbrook and Stoney Creek.

Service Area	Trans-Cab Point	Routes Serviced
Glanbrook	Garth at Rymal	35, 44
Glanbrook	Mountain Transit Centre	20, 27
Stoney Creek	Bell Manor Loop	2, 55A
Stoney Creek	Jones at Highway 8	55, 55A
Stoney Creek	Winona Crossing	55

=== HSR myRide ===
HSR myRide is a demand-responsive transit system offered to residents in eligible areas of Waterdown. Trips are booked using a smartphone app or over the phone, either for immediate pickup or up to 48 hours in advance. Service is available 7 days a week. Expansion is planned to areas of Dundas, Ancaster, Glanbrook, Stoney Creek, Winona, and a southeastern portion of Hamilton Mountain.

=== Accessible transportation ===
Accessible Transportation Services (ATS) is the section that administers a variety of accessible services on behalf of the City

- Accessible low-floor (ALF) buses provide level entry and exit to accommodate wheelchairs and walkers.
- Disabled and Aged Regional Transportation System (DARTS) is a non profit charitable organization that is the paratransit service provider.
- Taxi Scrip program provides discounted taxi coupons for ATS registered persons who are unable to access regular transit buses.

=== Mountain Climber ===
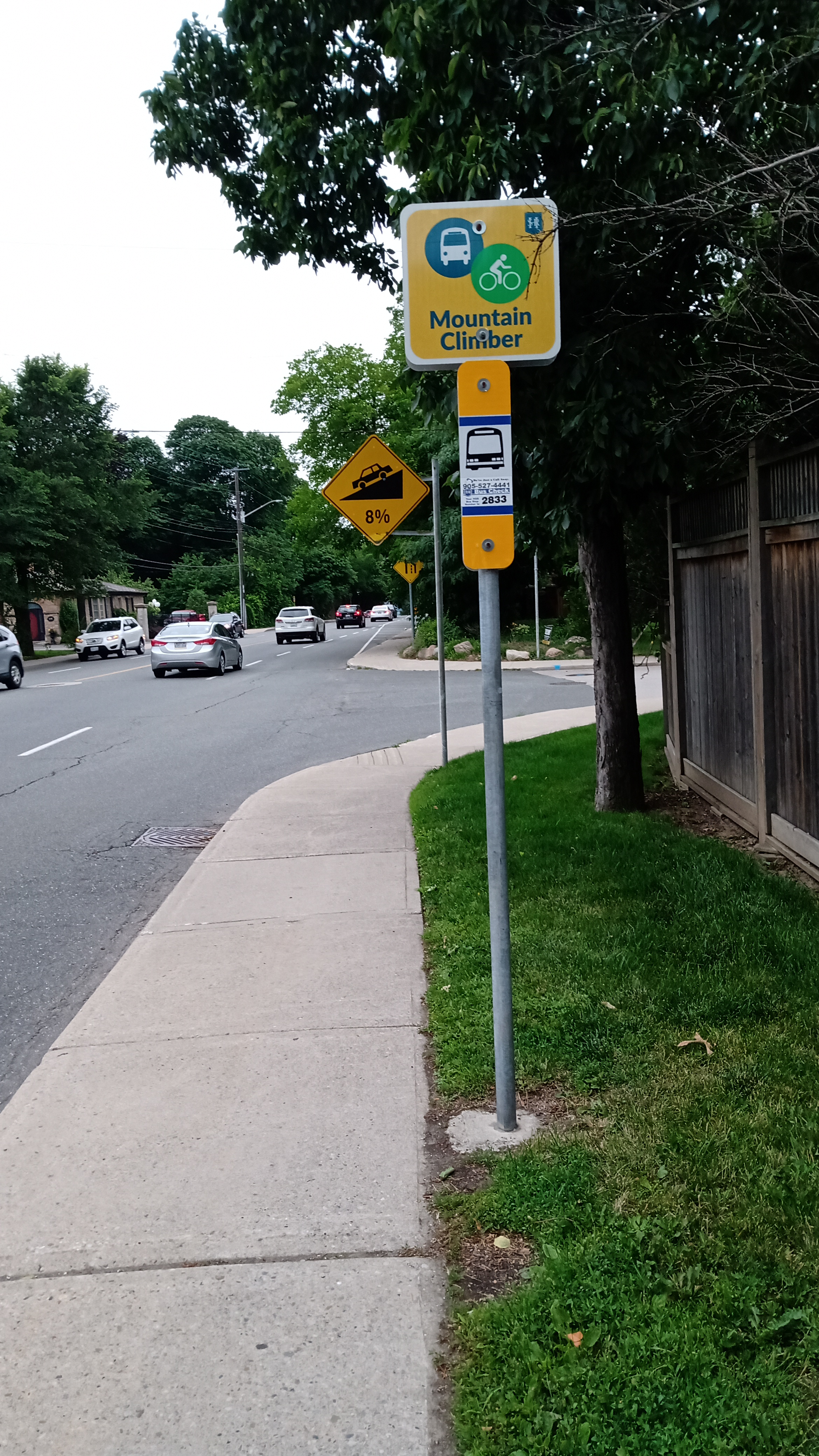
A mountain climber stop at the top of the mountain, on Garth Road.

In 2017, HSR launched a program called "Mountain Climber," that allows cyclists ride on the bus to get up and down Hamilton Mountain for free. This program was made permanent in 2018 and has since been expanded to include more stops.

Participating bus stops are located along major roads at the base and crest of the escarpment. People with bicycles load them onto the bus' front rack, and when boarding, tell the bus operator they are riding under Mountain Climber for free. The routes are very limited in length, and provide a safe way for cyclists to ascend or descend the mountain, in order to encourage active transportation.

== Rapid transit ==
Metrolinx, the provincial public transit agency, is planning a 14-kilometre (8.7 mi) light rail line along the Main/King/Queenston corridor from McMaster University to Eastgate Square. The line will have 17 stops. Previously known as the B-Line LRT, it is one of five BRT/LRT lines originating from the BLAST network proposal, now known as HSR Next. In April 2024, Hamilton City Council voted to recommend to Metrolinx private operation of the line for 10 years, after which HSR would operate the line. Five other rapid transit lines, BRT and/or priority bus routes, are also in active planning.

== Terminals and connections ==
HSR routes from downtown to the Mountain (21, 22, 23, 24, 25, 26, 27, 33, and 35) currently use the Frank A. Cooke Transit Terminal (former MacNab Transit Terminal), while several lower city routes (4, 6, 7, 8 and 9) have an on-street terminal layover at the intersection of Main and James Streets. Route 34 has a layover location at Main and MacNab.

On September 4, 2022, the City of Hamilton renamed the MacNab Transit Terminal to Frank A. Cooke Transit Terminal to honour an employee of the HSR that retired as a general manager and died at the age of 100. The terminal is located at 1 MacNab Street South and was opened in 2011. It serves 10 bus routes with 7,250 weekly arrivals and departures in 2022. The wheelchair accessible terminal has heated platforms, bus shelters, public washrooms and a green roof.

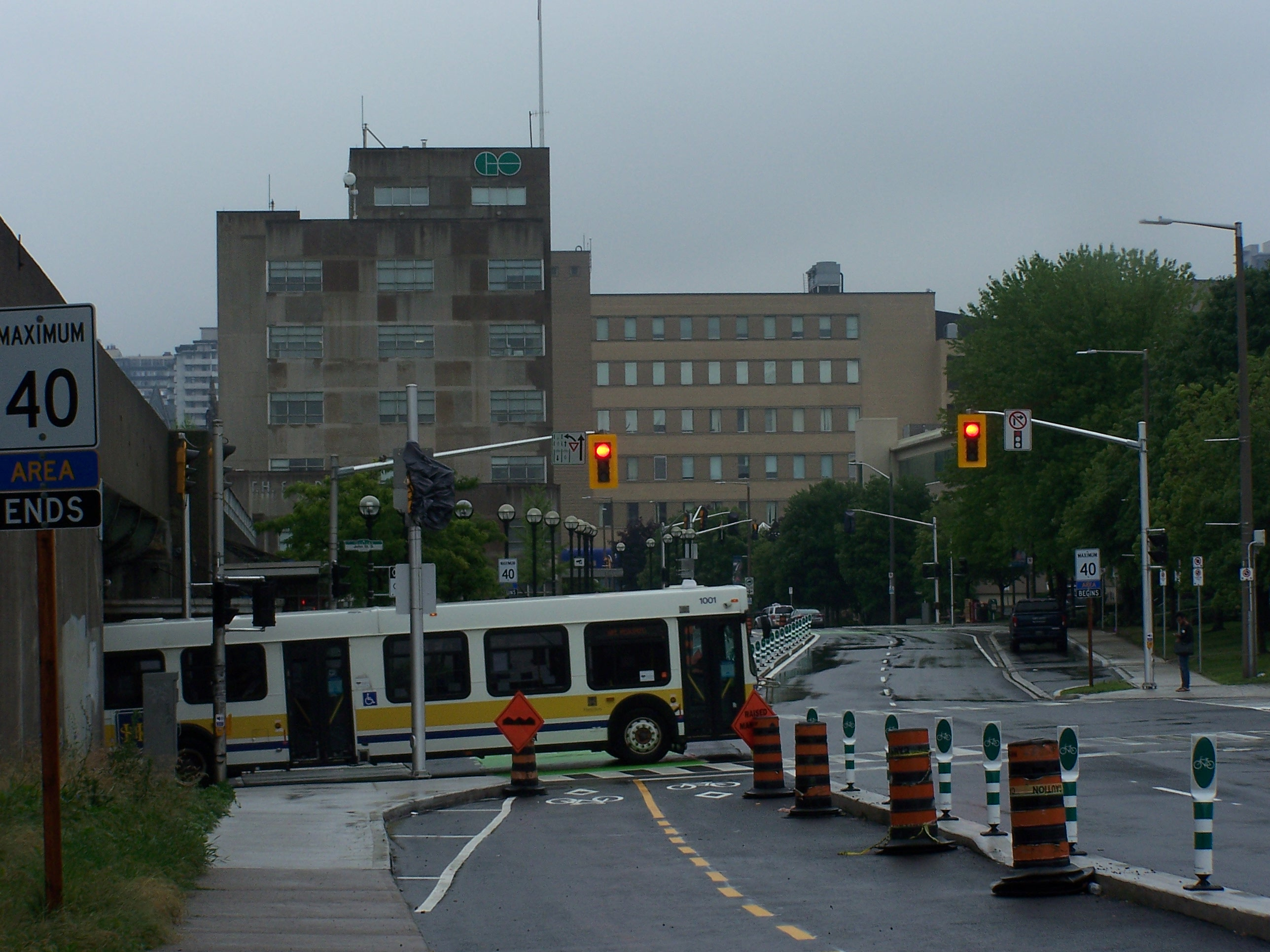
Bus exiting the GO centre via underpass

HSR connects with GO Transit at Hamilton GO Centre, which serves as the terminus for four HSR routes (1, 2, 3, and 51). The station, located at 36 Hunter Street East, a few blocks south of King and James, is the terminus of the Lakeshore West railway line and express Highway 407 and Queen Elizabeth Way GO Buses. It is also the former home of the main Greyhound Lines bus stop, prior to Greyhound Canada's Canada-wide closure in 2021. It is also the former Toronto, Hamilton and Buffalo Railway (TH&B) passenger station, and there is a small museum above the public concourse. Route 44 also connects with GO Transit at Confederation GO.

At the Mountain Transit Centre transfer point (served by routes 20 and 27) and a contract with Blue Line Taxi, the HSR also connects with other areas in the northwest portion of the former Glanbrook.

In addition, the HSR is connected with Burlington Transit, as one route (11 Parkdale) travels into Burlington via Burlington Beach, 18 Waterdown connects with BT at Aldershot GO Station, and BT Route 1 enters downtown Hamilton from Plains Road West. Also '9 Rock Gardens' travels into Burlington going into the Royal Botanical Gardens during the summer months.

=== Other terminals and loops ===
Location	Routes
Bell Manor Loop	2, 55A
Confederation Walmart	44, 56
Eastgate Transit Terminal	1/1A, 10, 44, 55/55A, 56
Frank A. Cooke Transit Terminal	21, 22, 23, 24, 25, 26, 27, 33, 35
Glancaster Loop	34, 44
Hamilton GO Centre	1, 2, 3, 51
Heritage Greene Terminal	21, 44
Hillcrest Loop	7
Lakeland Loop	56
Lime Ridge Transit Terminal	25, 26, 41, 42, 43
McMaster University	1A, 5A, 51 service campus 5, 5B and 10 service Main Street West; GO Transit bus service from GO Bus Station on campus
Meadowlands Terminal	5A. 16, 41, 43
Mohawk College Transit Terminal	20, 21, 33, 35
Princess Point Loop	6
Scenic & Lavender Loop	33
Strathcona Loop	8
University Plaza	10
Upper Horning Loop	34A
Watsons Lane Loop	52
West Hamilton Loop	1A, 51
Valley Park Loop	11, 43

== Fares ==
HSR fares can be paid with exact cash (no change given), Presto card or the mobile Presto e-tickets app. Starting in 2023, riders could tap their credit or debit card on the Presto reader to pay the cash fare amount.

A single-ride fare provides a 2 hour transfer window which allows customers to get on and off HSR buses as many times as they want on a single fare. It also allows free transfers to/from Burlington Transit and even Oakville Transit buses within the same 2 hour transfer window.

Children ages 0 to 5 years old can ride fare-free when travelling with an accompanying paying adult. Hamilton senior residents aged 80 and over can ride fare-free only when travelling with a valid Presto card, for those who do not have a Presto card, they are required to pay a regular fare.

Unlike the surrounding transit agencies such as Oakville Transit, Burlington Transit and GO Transit, which offer free transit trips for all children ages 0-12. On HSR buses, the free-fare programs for children ages 6-12 is only applicable to those using a child Presto card, those without a Presto card are charged the full fare.

Regular cash fare as of September 1, 2025 is $3.75 (payable with exact cash or contactless credit or debit card).

== Staff ==
HSR bus drivers and mechanics (800 employees as of 2019) are members of the Amalgamated Transit Union Local 107. The local does not represent those working on city's paratransit service, Disabled and Aged Regional Transportation System (DARTS), which is a separate, non-profit charitable organization that contracts with HSR.

=== 2023 strike ===
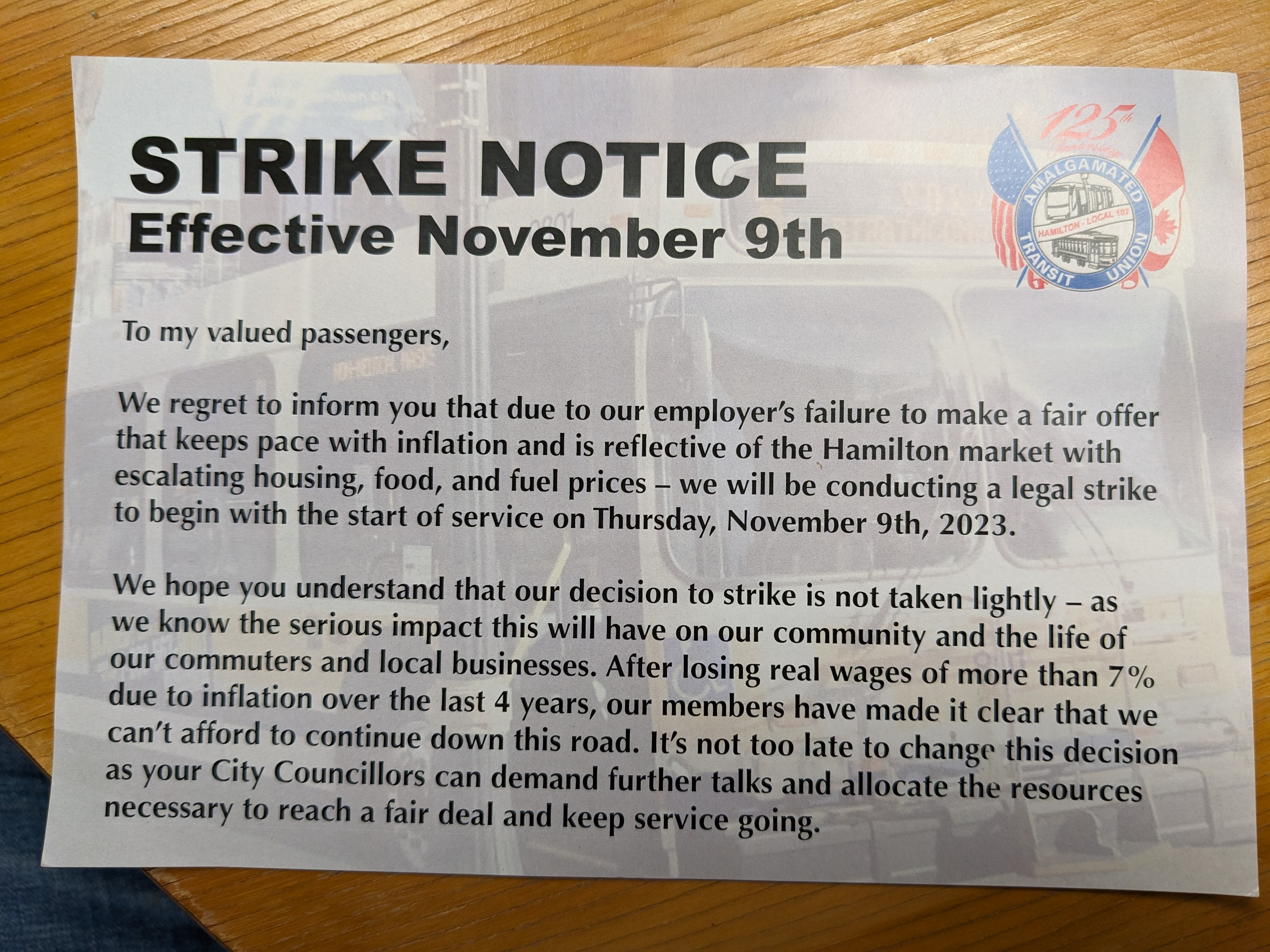
A copy of a strike notice given to HSR passengers in the days leading up to the strike

After regular collective bargaining talks broke down, ATU Local 107 workers went on strike at 12 am on November 9, 2023. The union cited wage increases that did not keep up with the rate of inflation in a handout given to passengers in the days proceeding the job action. The strike came as the city was preparing and hosting festivities for the 110th Grey Cup, for which HSR had been planning to run a shuttle service for fans. The transit union said that any shuttle service would be considered as using scab labour and would be targeted by picket lines. In the early hours of November 16, Mayor Andrea Horwath announced that a deal had been made and that there would be a return to regular service on November 17, 2023. The new 4-year contract was ratified by Local 107 members on November 23 with 81% voting in favour of the deal that in lieu of a changed wage offer, gave transit workers a one-time payment as well as benefit increases.

== Gallery ==
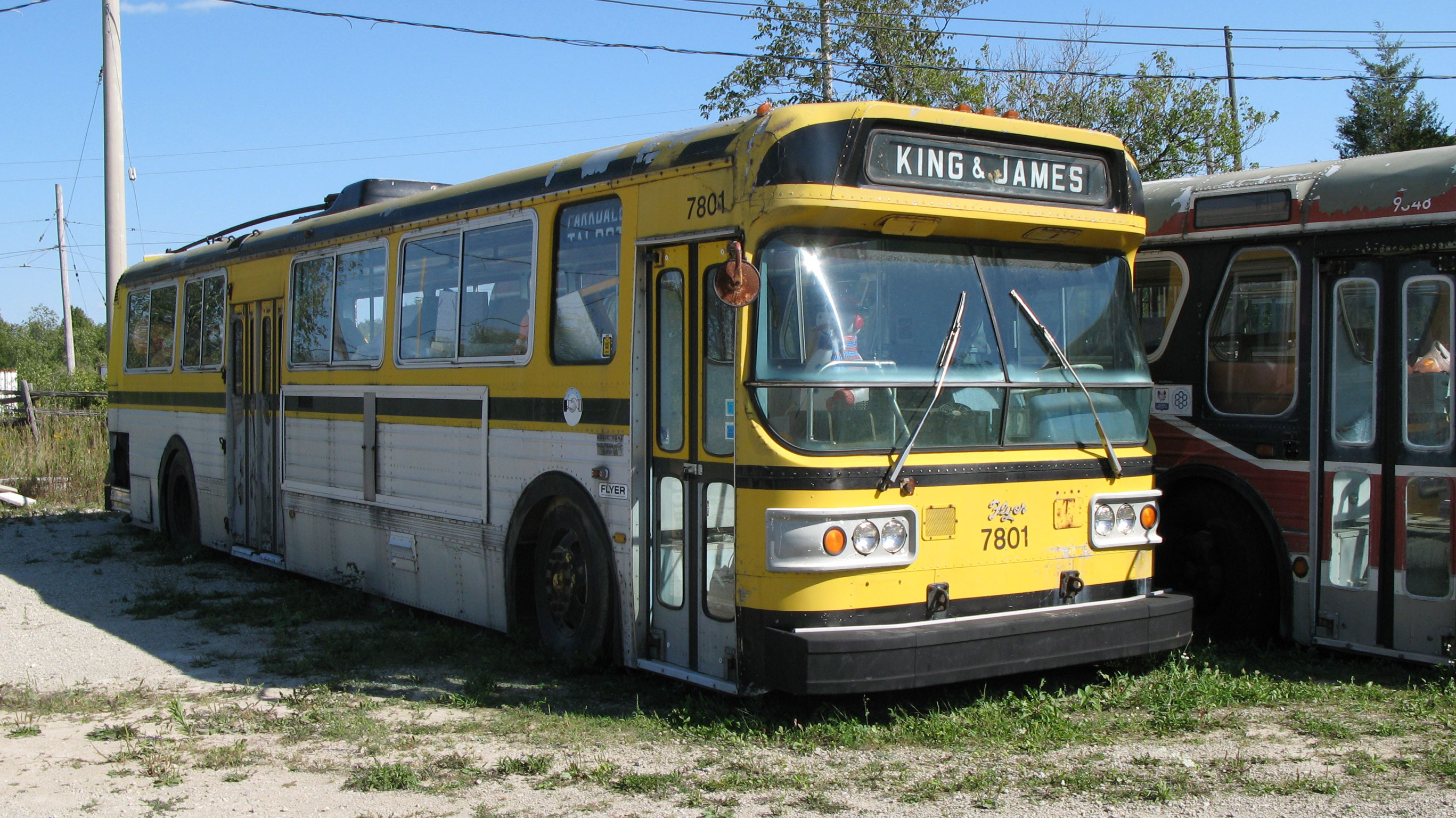
Two of the Hamilton Street Railway's former Flyer E800 trolley buses are preserved at the Halton County Radial Railway museum.

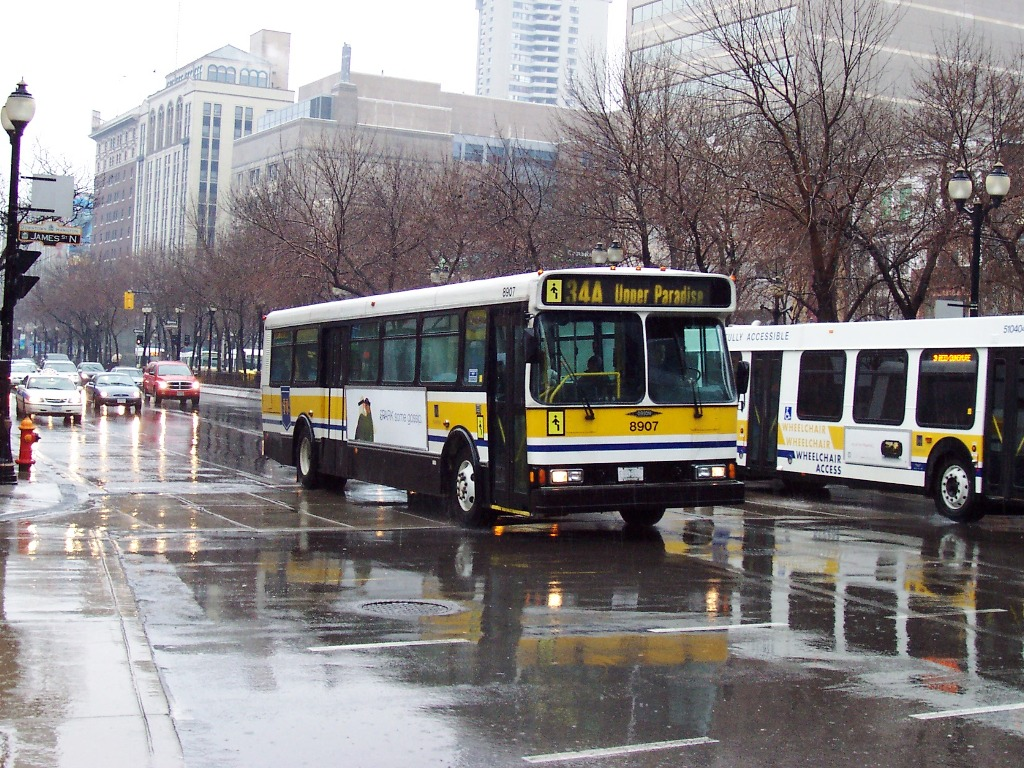
Hamilton Street Railway Orion V 8907 on the 34A route at the intersection of King and James Streets in downtown Hamilton.

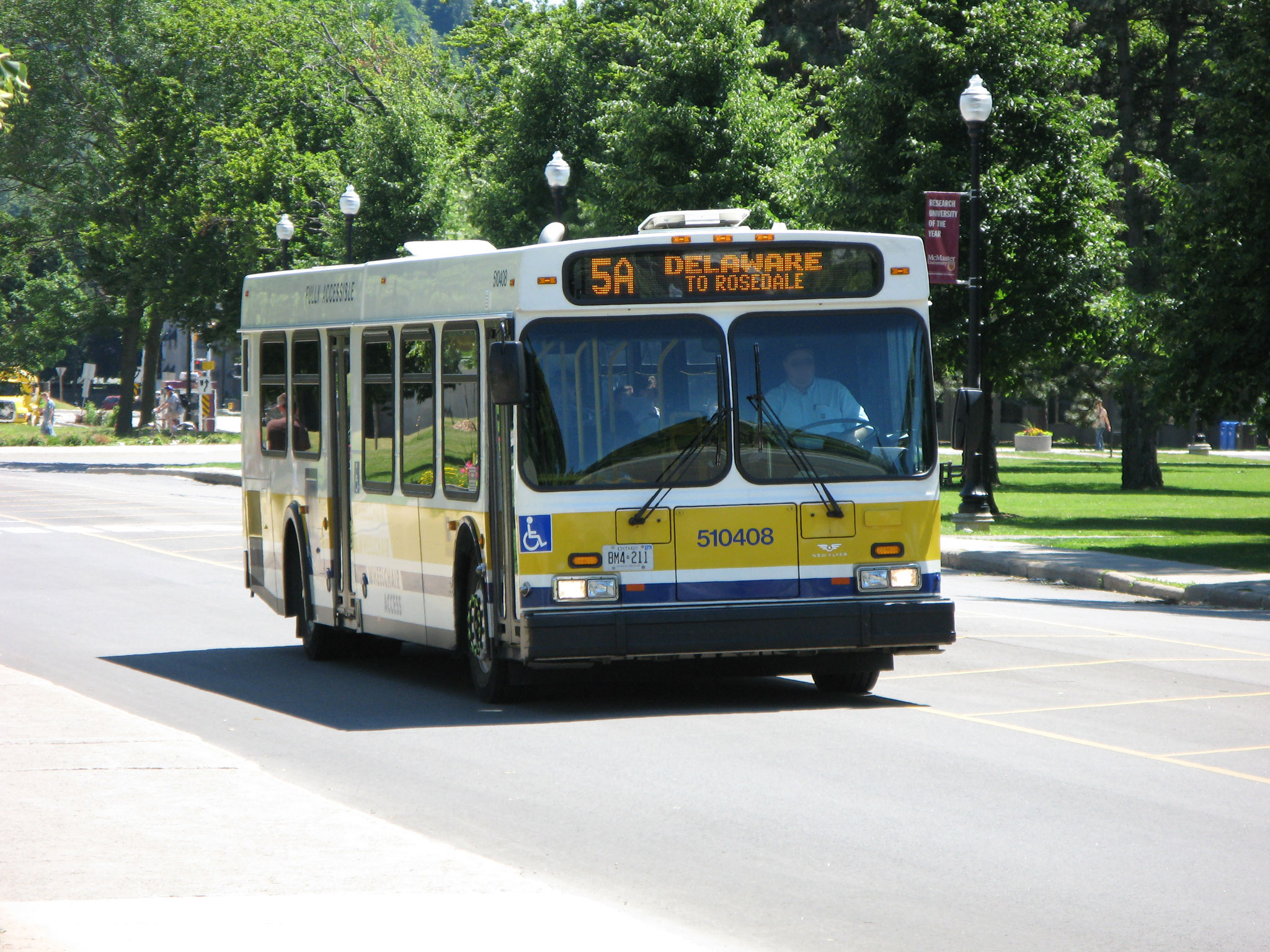
A New Flyer D40LF Operating on the route 5 Delaware, near McMaster University.

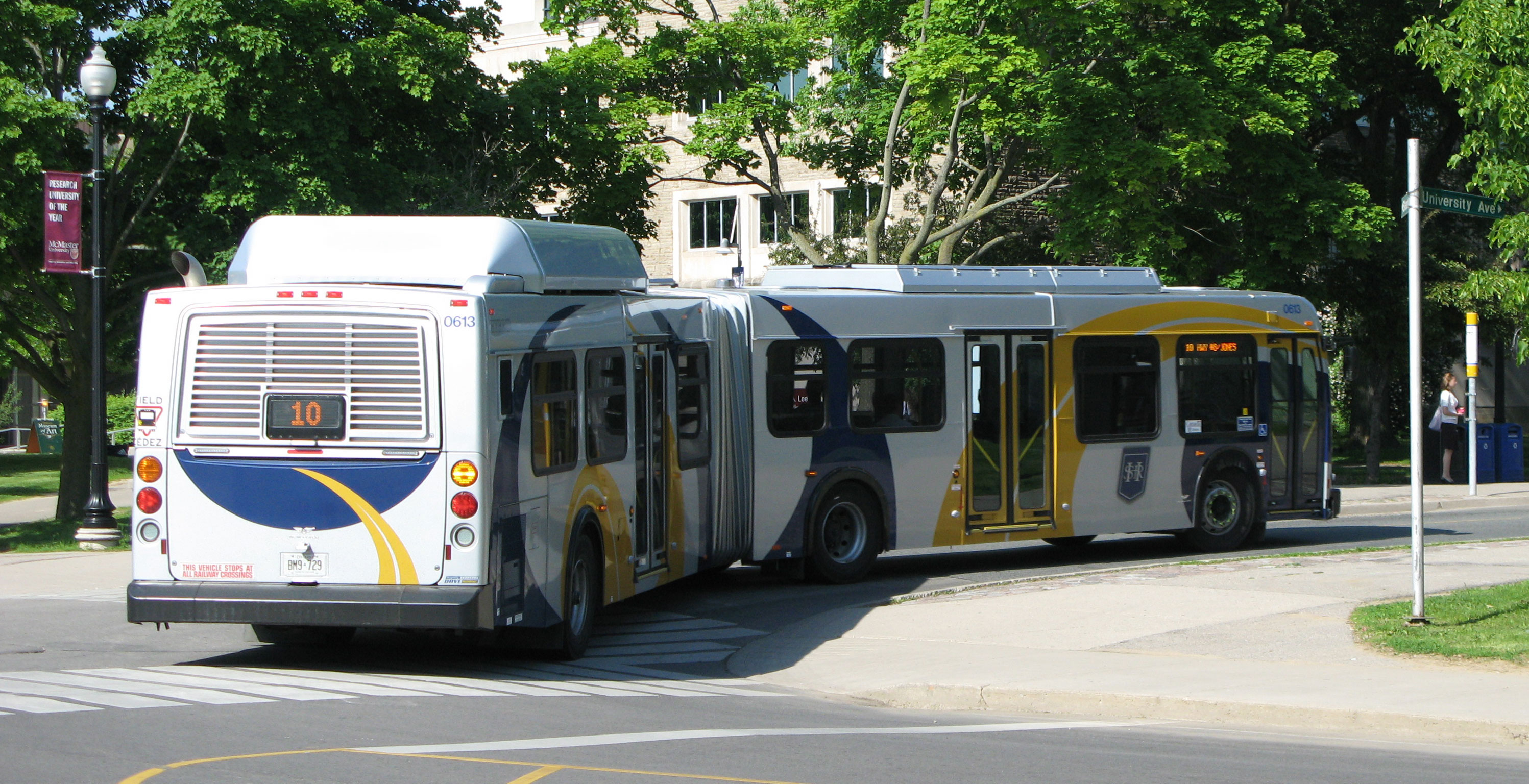
In 2007, the HSR introduced articulated New Flyer hybrid buses for the route 10 B-Line Express.

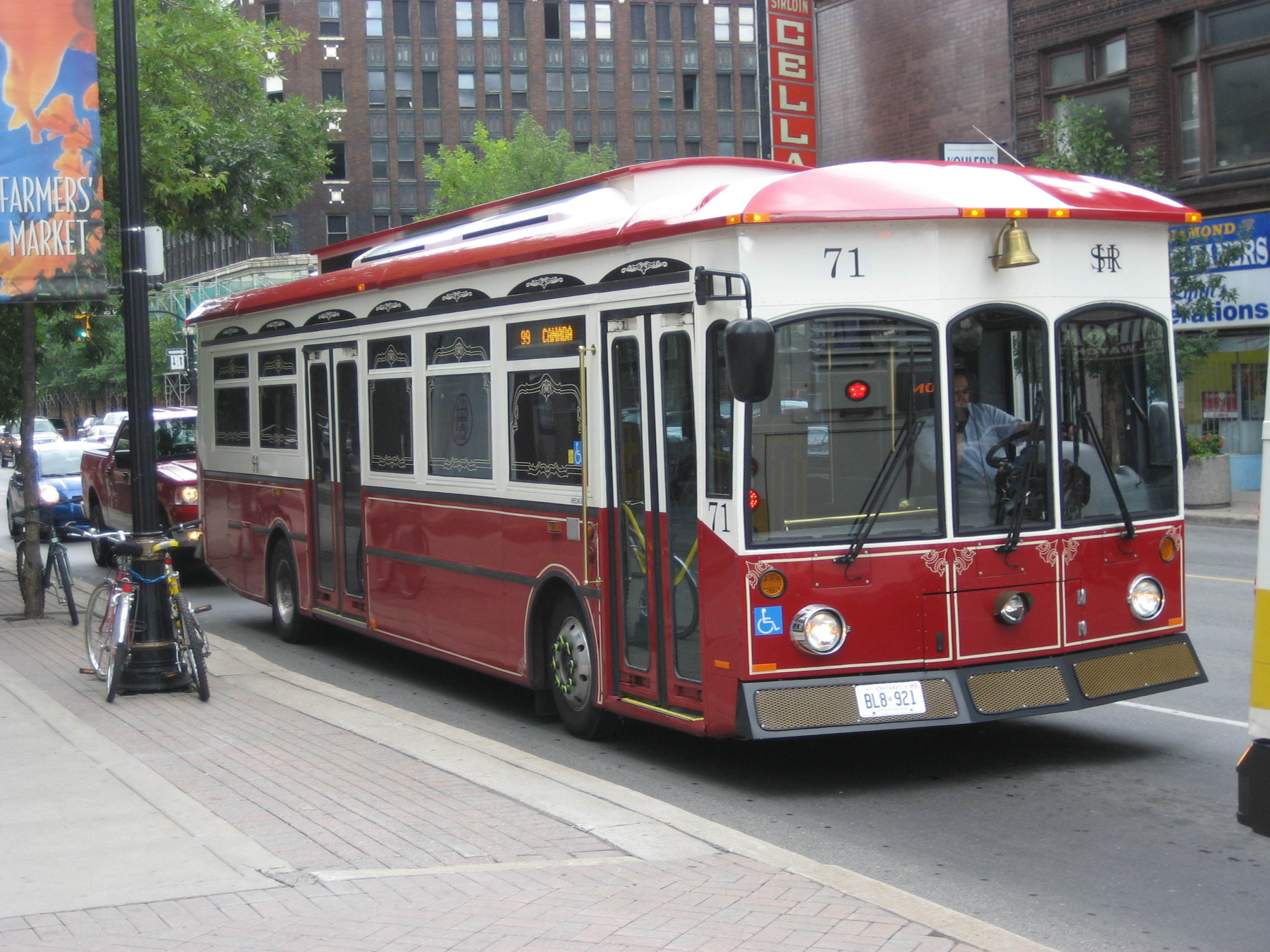
Route 99 – Waterfront Shuttle (2008).

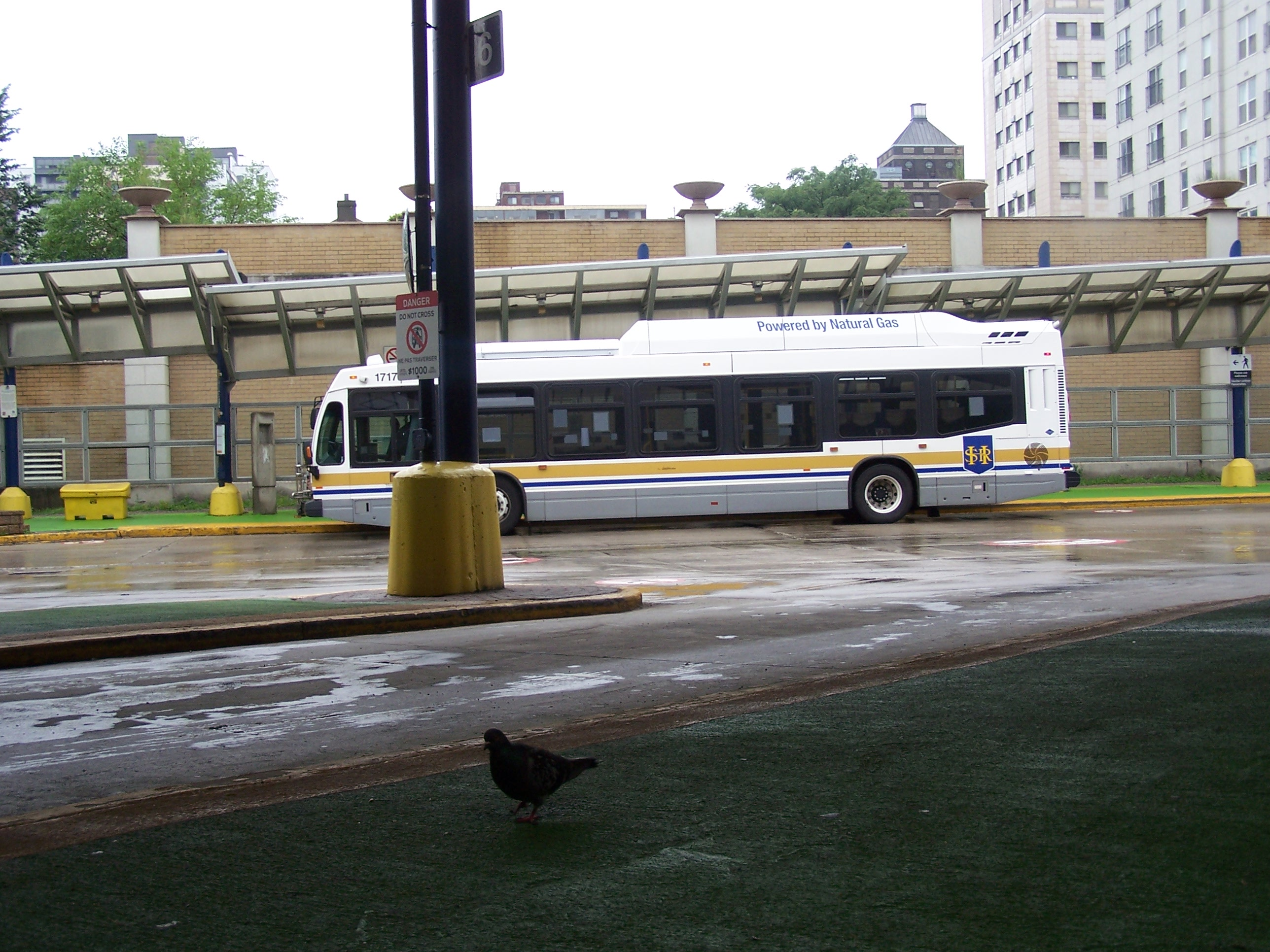
A Novabus LFS CNG parked near Hamilton GO Centre. These Novabusses make up a majority of the HSR fleet.

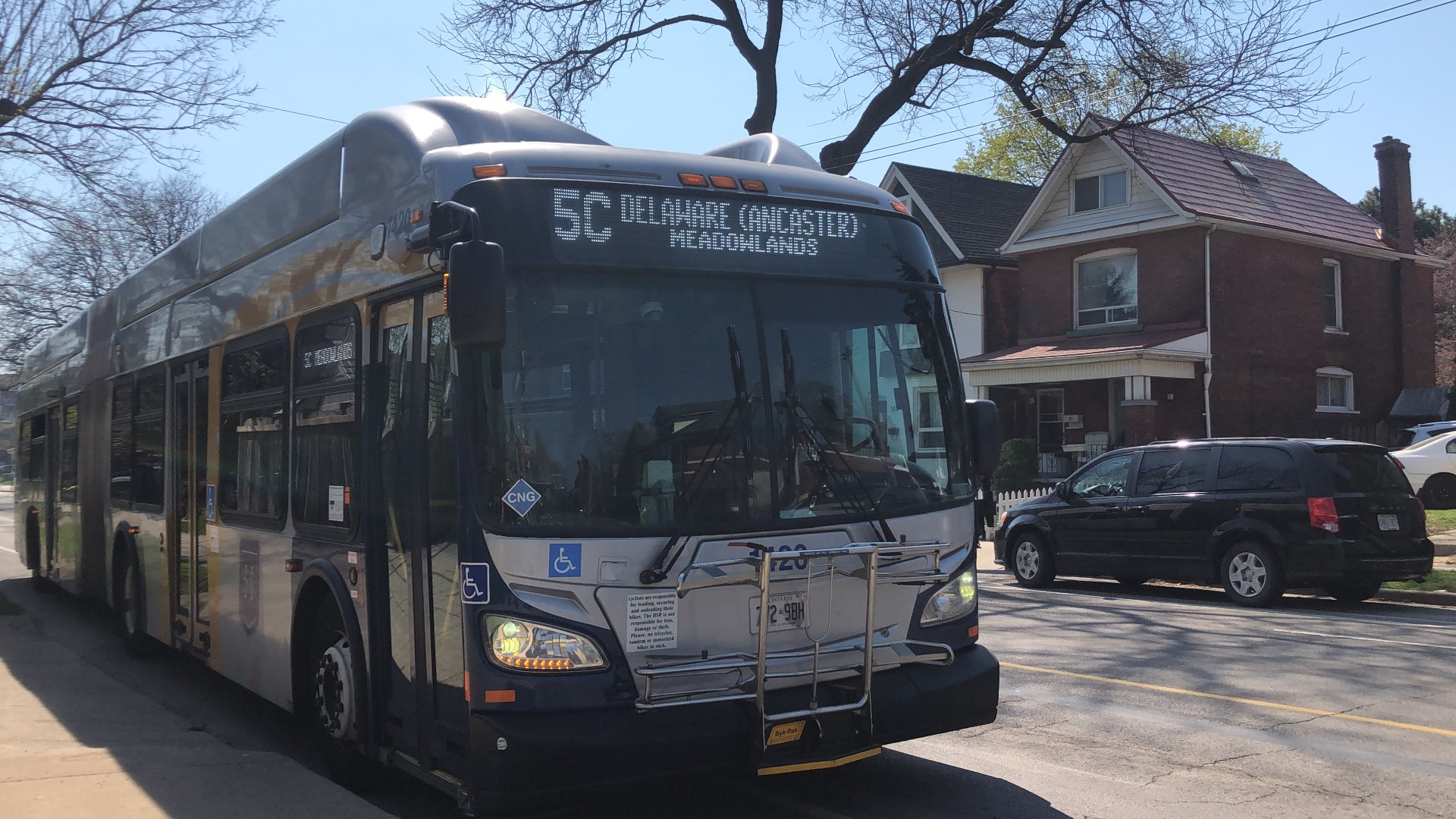
A New Flyer XN60 operating on route 5C Delaware towards Meadowlands, along Maplewood Avenue, on a sunny day.
