= Brantford station (Toronto, Hamilton and Buffalo Railway) =

Railway station in Brantford, Ontario, Canada

Brantford
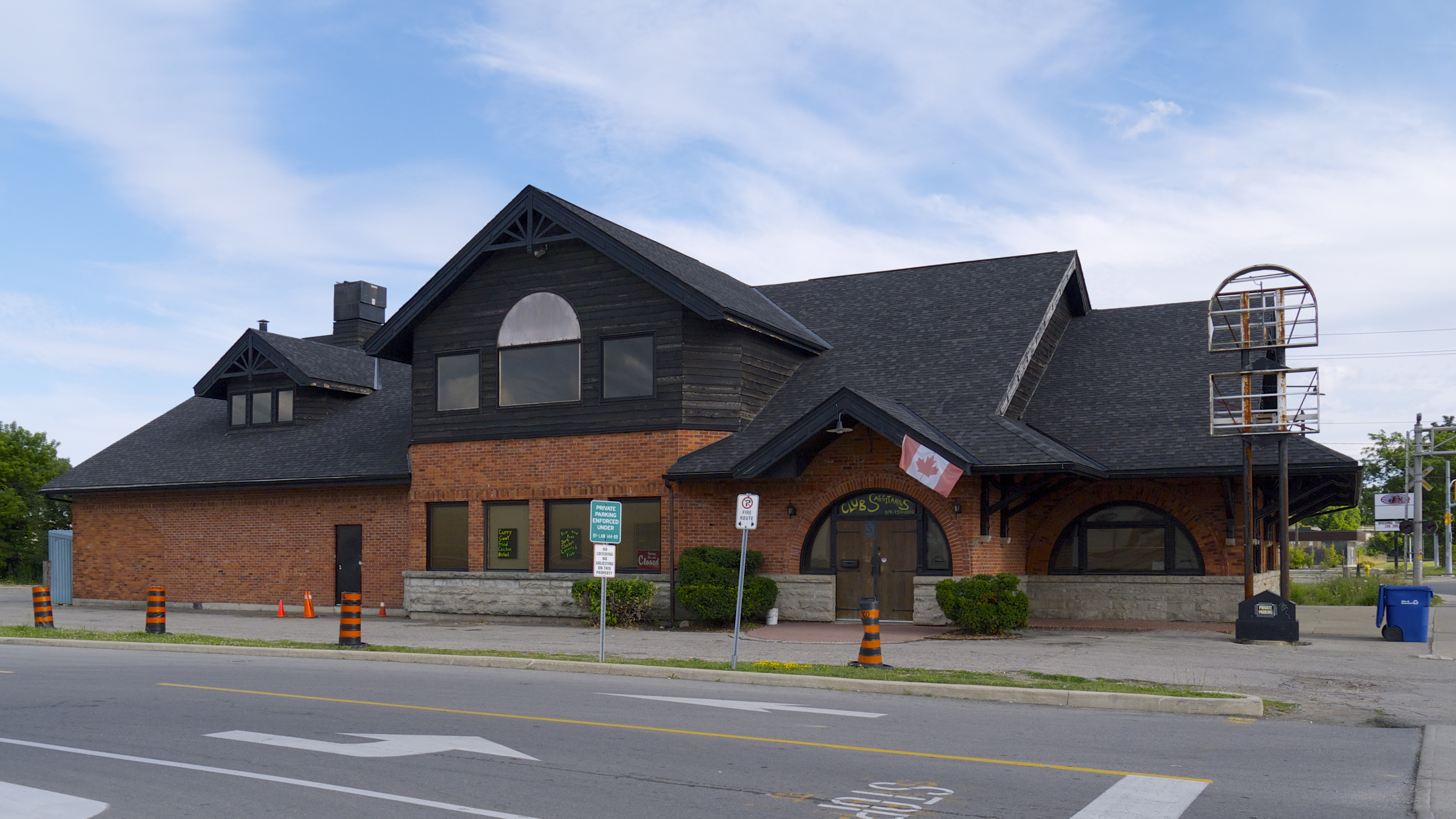
- The former station in 2013

General information
- Location: 60 Market St S, Brantford, Ontario; Canada
- Coordinates: 43.1347°N 80.2626°W
- Operator: Toronto, Hamilton and Buffalo Railway

History
- Opened: 1896

Former services
Preceding station	Toronto, Hamilton and Buffalo Railway	Following station
Mount Pleasant toward Waterford	Waterford– Hamilton	Jerseyville toward Hamilton
Location

The Brantford Station is a former Toronto, Hamilton & Buffalo Railway station, located in Brantford, Ontario. After closing as a railway station, it was sold in 1969 and operated as a steak house from 1970 until it closed in 2007.

== Historical Information ==
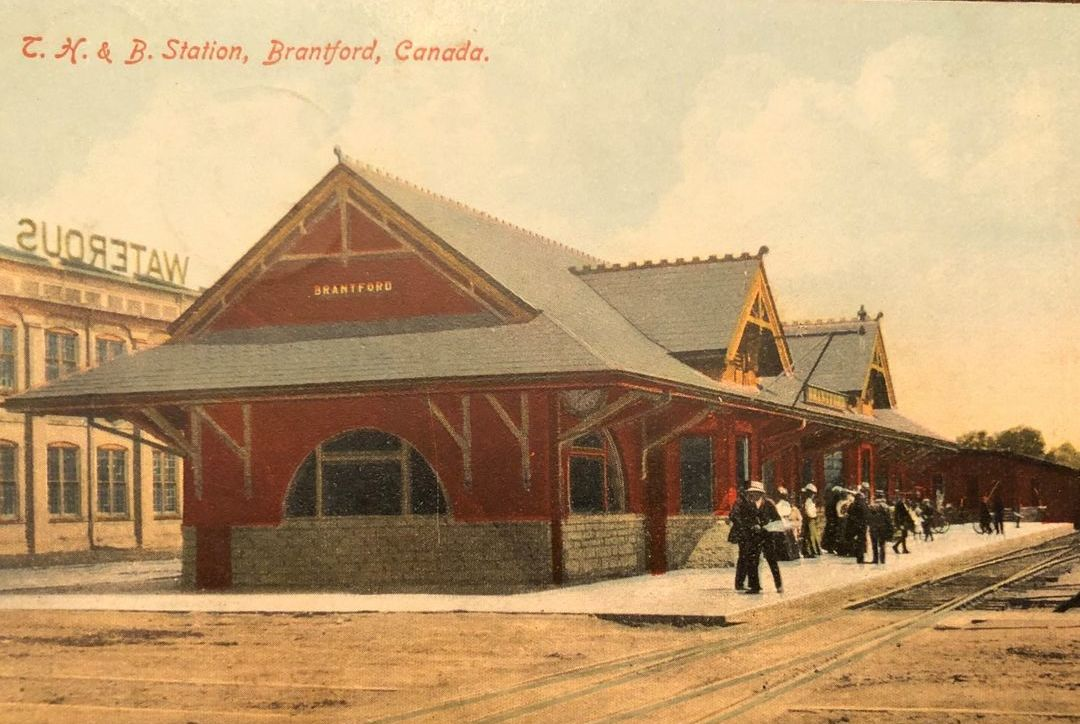
Postcard showing the station circa 1911. We can see the Watreous manufacturing plant to the left.

The current building was the third structure built by the railway at the site. A building permit was issued in 1899 to erect a frame shed on the east side of the site, north of Erie Avenue, for a value of $400. Another permit was issued in 1900 to erect a frame shed on the east side of Lot 19 for a value of $1,000. Finally, a permit for a new brick station was issued in 1906, for the east side of Lots 19-20, for a value of $6,500.

The 1 1/2-storey red-brick structure in built in the Queen Anne Revival style. Per the City of Brantford: "Features such as the round conical corner tower, bay windows; large round arches on the west facade are indicative of this style. The base course is a rock-faced coursed range of limestone. Some unusual features are the wooden timber brackets with a circle inside a capital "A" shape resting on a stone corbel. The brickwork of the lintel course (alternating recessed soldier course between two single stretcher courses) suggests a train track pattern. This feature is similar to what is seen on the west facade of the Brantford Armouries.” A notable feature of the building is a large stone sill of the left bay dormer that has "1896" engraved in it. A 1906 addition to the building generally replicated the features of the original structure.

The station sits on a 27,045 square foot lot, with around 90 feet of street frontage.

A number of local industries built manufacturing plants along the railway line including the Waterous Engine Works, the Cockshutt Plow Company, Goold, Shapley and Muir and Slingsby’s. This rail connection allowed for products manufactured in the city to be exported to the United States and other countries around the world.

The building was sold in 1969 and operated as the Iron Horse steakhouse until 2007, when the restaurant closed. The building has sat vacant since the restaurant closed. In 2019, the City looked at adding an historical designation to the structure; “The intended designation would only include the 1896 structure and the 1906 addition to the railway station and not later modifications, said Nathan Etherington, chair of the heritage committee. The designation would be a proactive step to minimize any further damage to the exterior of building, including some flaking of the limestone at the base of the structure and some mortar work.”
