= Lime Ridge Mall =

Shopping mall in Hamilton, Ontario

- Inside of Lime Ridge Mall in 2014
- Coordinates: 43.218°N 79.862°W
- Address: 999 Upper Wentworth Street; Hamilton, Ontario, Canada; L9A 4X5
- Opened: September 13, 1981
- Previous names: Lime Ridge Mall (1981–2015); CF Lime Ridge (2015–2025)
- Manager: Primaris Real Estate Investment Trust
- Owner: Genstar Development Company (1981–1983); Cadillac Fairview (1983–2025); Primaris Real Estate Investment Trust (2025–present)
- Num. of stores: 180
- Num. of anchor tenants: 2
- Floor area: 815,000 square feet (75,700 m^{2})
- Floors: 2
- Website: limeridgemall.ca

Lime Ridge Mall is a two-level indoor shopping mall in Hamilton, Ontario, Canada. Opened on September 13, 1981, it is the largest mall complex in the city, an 815,000-square-foot (75,700 m^{2}) super-regional shopping centre with 180 stores including department stores and big box stores.

== History ==
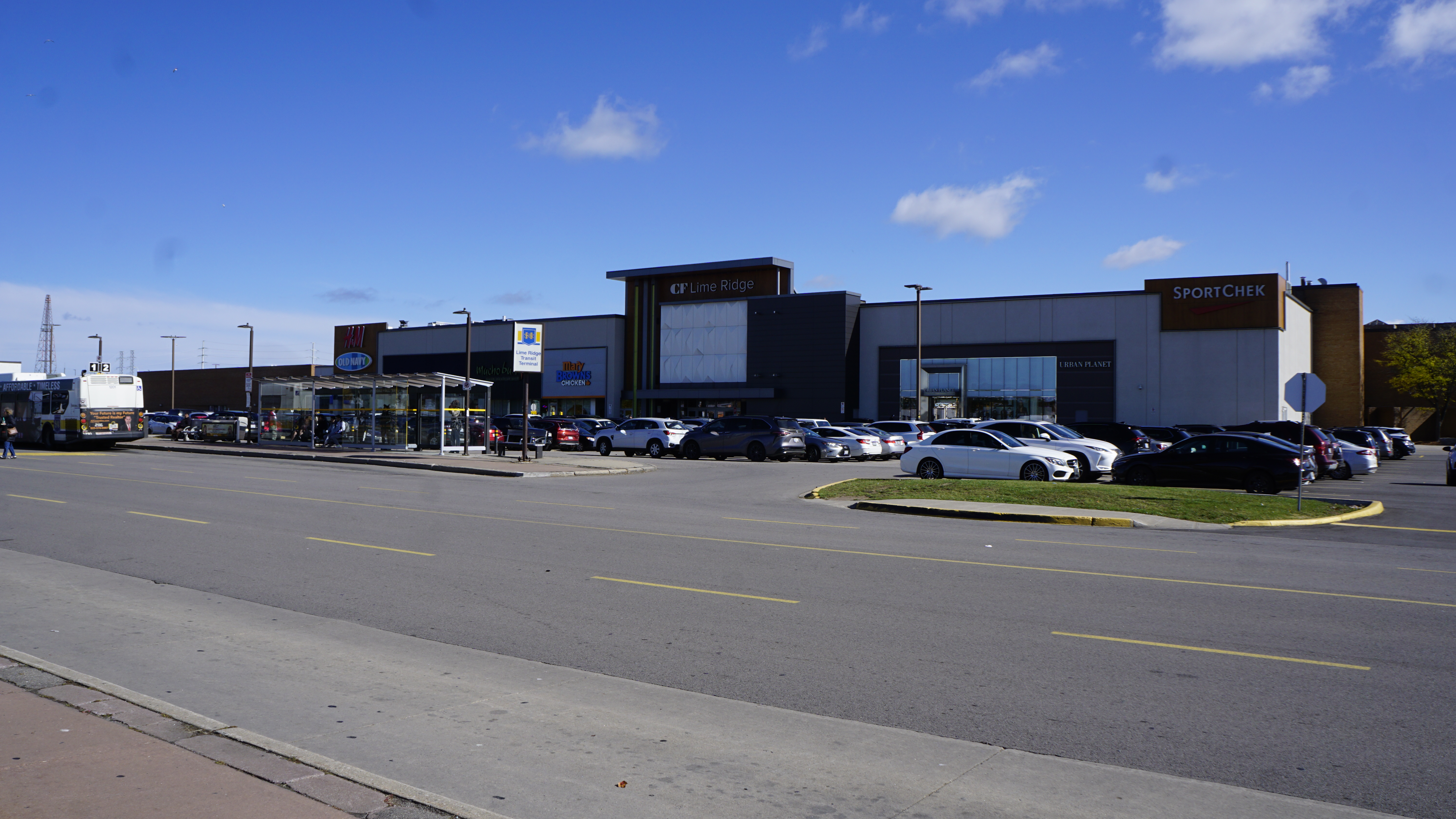
Lime Ridge Mall in October 2023.

Lime Ridge Mall was opened on September 13, 1981, and today has 180 stores and kiosks. Sears and the Hudson's Bay were Lime Ridge Mall's two anchor tenants. Sears Canada closed in 2017 and Hudson's Bay closed in 2025.

In 1981, the Government of Ontario offered to build an elevated rapid transit line from the Lloyd D. Jackson Square in downtown Hamilton, to the mall. Hamilton turned the proposal down.

The mall, which includes an office building, was managed by Cadillac Fairview and has four floors of office space. Bell Media radio stations in Hamilton are tenants of the building.

On June 17, 2025, Primaris Real Estate Investment Trust (REIT) acquired a 100 percent interest in the mall from an entity managed by Cadillac Fairview for $416 million.

In late 2025, it was announced that Walmart Canada would be opening a store in Lime Ridge Mall in 2027. The new store is expected to make Walmart a new anchor tenant, replacing Sears.

== Lime Ridge Terminal ==
Lime Ridge Terminal

General information
- Location: 999 Upper Wentworth Street; Hamilton, Ontario; L9A 4X5; Canada
- Coordinates: 43°13′05″N 79°51′48″W
- Bus routes: 6
- Bus stands: 5
- Bus operators: Hamilton Street Railway

Construction
- Structure type: Outdoor bus shelters
- Accessible: Yes
Location

The Hamilton Street Railway bus terminal is located on the west side of the mall at Upper Wentworth Street. A total of four routes and two shuttles loop or pass through this terminal.
