= Hamilton and Dundas Street Railway =

Overview
- Headquarters: Hamilton, Ontario
- Locale: Niagara Peninsula, Ontario
- Dates of operation: 1875–1923

Technical
- Track gauge: 4 ft 8 1/2 in (1,435 mm) standard gauge

The Hamilton and Dundas Street Railway was an interurban railway operator which ran between Hamilton and Dundas in Southern Ontario, Canada.

== Route ==
The Hamilton and Dundas Street Railway provided a rail link between its two namesake cities. Between late 1907 and 1923, the line was 11 kilometres (7 mi) long. In that period, the line ran starting in Dundas from King Street south on Bond Street to Hatt Street. Then it ran in street trackage along Hatt and Dundas Streets, leaving the streets to run along Dundas Creek for a short distance before turning south through Ainslie Woods to Aberdeen Avenue just west of Hamilton. The railway then entered Hamilton on a right-of-way paralleling Aberdeen Avenue, reaching its downtown terminal in street trackage via Queen, Herkimer, James and Main Streets to terminate at Hamilton Terminal Station at Catherine Street.

The H&D was forbidden by its franchise to operate carload freight in Hamilton, but did carry parcel freight and newspapers on its passenger or combine cars. The Toronto, Hamilton and Buffalo Railway operated freight trains over the H&D between West Hamilton and its freight station at Hatt and McMurray Streets in Dundas.

== History ==
The Hamilton and Dundas Street Railway was incorporated in 1875 to run a steam railway between the two cities. It used steam dummy locomotives, vehicles fully enclosed in a box-shaped body to resemble a streetcar, which pulled a train of passenger carriages. When service started, there were three dummy engines which could each pull up to six cars, but more typically one or two. The first test train ran on May 16, 1879, with revenue service starting on May 23, 1879. Initially, the line ran from Hatt and Foundry Streets in Dundas to the Grand Trunk Railway station at Ferguson Avenue in downtown Hamilton. At that time, the H&D entered downtown Hamilton from Aberdeen Avenue via Queen, Charlton, Macnab and Main Streets.

On June 17, 1897, the Toronto, Hamilton and Buffalo Railway started operating steam train freight service over the H&D according to an agreement between the two companies. A track connection between the TH&B and the H&D had been built in West Hamilton. There was a TH&B freight station at McMurray Street with sidings without overhead wire as the TH&B would service these spurs.

Work to electrify the line began in 1897 with electric service beginning on January 1, 1898. At about this time H&D service was cut back from Ferguson Avenue to Catherine Street in Hamilton.

Effective 17, 1899, the Dominion Power and Transmission Company, owner of the Hamilton Street Railway, took over the H&D. On December 1, 1899, the H&D was routed over HSR tracks to terminate at the Hamilton Radial terminal at Gore Street. After a new Hamilton Terminal Station was opened in November 1907 at King and Catherine Streets, the H&D was rerouted via James and Main streets to terminate there.

Sometime after 1900, the line was extended west along Hatt Street and north on Bond street to King street in Dundas.

On September 17, 1919, the HSR began 30-minute service to West Hamilton using the H&D line, but this was a separate-fare service. On June 18, 1922, service frequency over the entire H&D line was increased to every 30 minutes to fight bus competition.

Operating deficits for the line started to appear in 1916. Because of competing bus service, passenger volume dropped by half between 1920 and 1923. The last runs on the H&D were on September 5, 1923, the line being permanently replaced by buses on the following day. The HSR continued to operate service on Aberdeen Avenue until 1947. Unused H&D track along Aberdeen Avenue between West Hamilton and Longwood Road was removed in 1944. In 1927, the TH&B purchased the 5.6 kilometres (3.5 mi) of H&D track that it used for freight service in Dundas and made it a TH&B branch, which was abandoned in 1987.
