= Toronto, Hamilton and Buffalo Railway =

Former railway in Canada

Overview
- Headquarters: Hamilton, Ontario
- Reporting mark: THB
- Locale: Niagara Peninsula, Ontario
- Dates of operation: 1892–1987
- Successor: Canadian Pacific Railway

Technical
- Track gauge: 4 ft 8 1/2 in (1,435 mm) standard gauge

The Toronto, Hamilton and Buffalo Railway (reporting mark THB) was a railway based in Hamilton that ran in Southern Ontario from 1892 to 1987. It never reached the other two cities in its name, though it had branch lines extending to Dunnville and Port Maitland.

== History ==
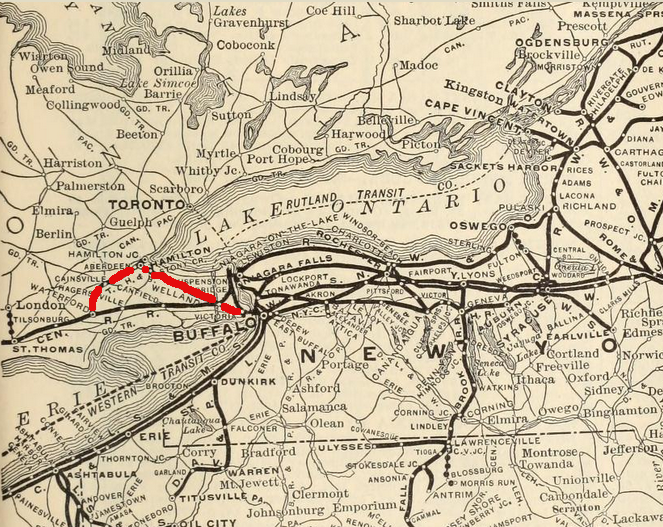
TH&B system map, circa 1908. TH&B tracks marked in red.

The railway was originally chartered in 1884 by the Ontario Legislative Assembly to run from Toronto to the International Railway Bridge, connecting with local lines to Buffalo. The original charter forbade the company any attempt to merge with, lease from, sell to, or pool with any other railway. Given the business conditions at the time, that turned out to be an impossible condition. The original corporation was unable to complete the line before the original charter expired and so the government revived the act by requiring the line to be completed by 1894 with a new group of promoters.

The line began operations in 1892, when it took over the incomplete line of the Brantford, Waterloo & Lake Erie Railway between Brantford and Waterford. The line reached Hamilton in October, 1894 and Welland on December 30, 1895.

In 1895, the Canadian Pacific Railway and the New York Central Railroad bought the TH&B.

In 1911, the TH&B was the first railway in North America to install the Absolute Permissive Block Signalling for single operation track allowing safe and efficient travel avoiding head-on and rear end collisions by holding one train back on the siding.

TH&B locomotive No. 22 with crew, circa 1900-1910.

The TH&B was jointly owned by the CPR and the NYC for several decades. The NYC and its subsidiaries (Michigan Central Railroad and Canada Southern Railway) owned 73%, and the CPR owned the other 27%. It never built into Toronto or Buffalo but used its parent companies' trackage to reach both cities. Passenger service on the TH&B was discontinued on April 26, 1981 when Amtrak's Maple Leaf began service. In 1977, CP Rail acquired the NYC's portion (then part of Conrail), giving the CPR 90% ownership. The CPR merged the TH&B into its system in 1987. The TH&B line between Hamilton and Welland is still in use, but its former line west of Hamilton to Waterford via Brantford has been abandoned apast Aberdeen Avenue in Hamilton. The portion between Hamilton and Brantford was abandoned in the 1980s after trackage next to the Grand River had been washed out. Some former TH&B industrial trackage still remains in the city of Brantford, but it is now operated by Canadian National Railway.

Increased operating costs and tighter profit margins in that decade meant the future of the railroad was much in doubt. The TH&B Railway was merged into the Canadian Pacific Railway on January 1, 1987.

A portion of the former TH&B Dunnville Subdivision (now CP's Dunnville Spur), running south from Smithville, was abandoned on May 7, 2001 because of the deteriorating condition of several wooden trestles along the line. Trains now use the former NYC CASO Subdivision from Welland west to the former junction with the TH&B at E & O (Erie & Ontario) Tower, where a new connecting track was constructed to access the remainder of the line to Port Maitland via Dunnville.

== Paint scheme ==
The railroad's yellow and black paint scheme started being applied to boxcars in early 1952, and was later applied to cabooses in 1954. These colours were chosen in honour of the local Hamilton Tiger-Cats football team.

== Railway stations ==
The TH&B's first Hamilton station was constructed between June and December of 1885 on the corner of James and Hunter Streets on the north side of the TH&B's main line running at grade along Hunter Street, just east of the Hunter Street Tunnel. With up to 26 daily trains blocking growing automobile traffic along Hunter Street, the TH&B eventually elevated the tracks above the surrounding land and thus needed to replace the original Hamilton station.

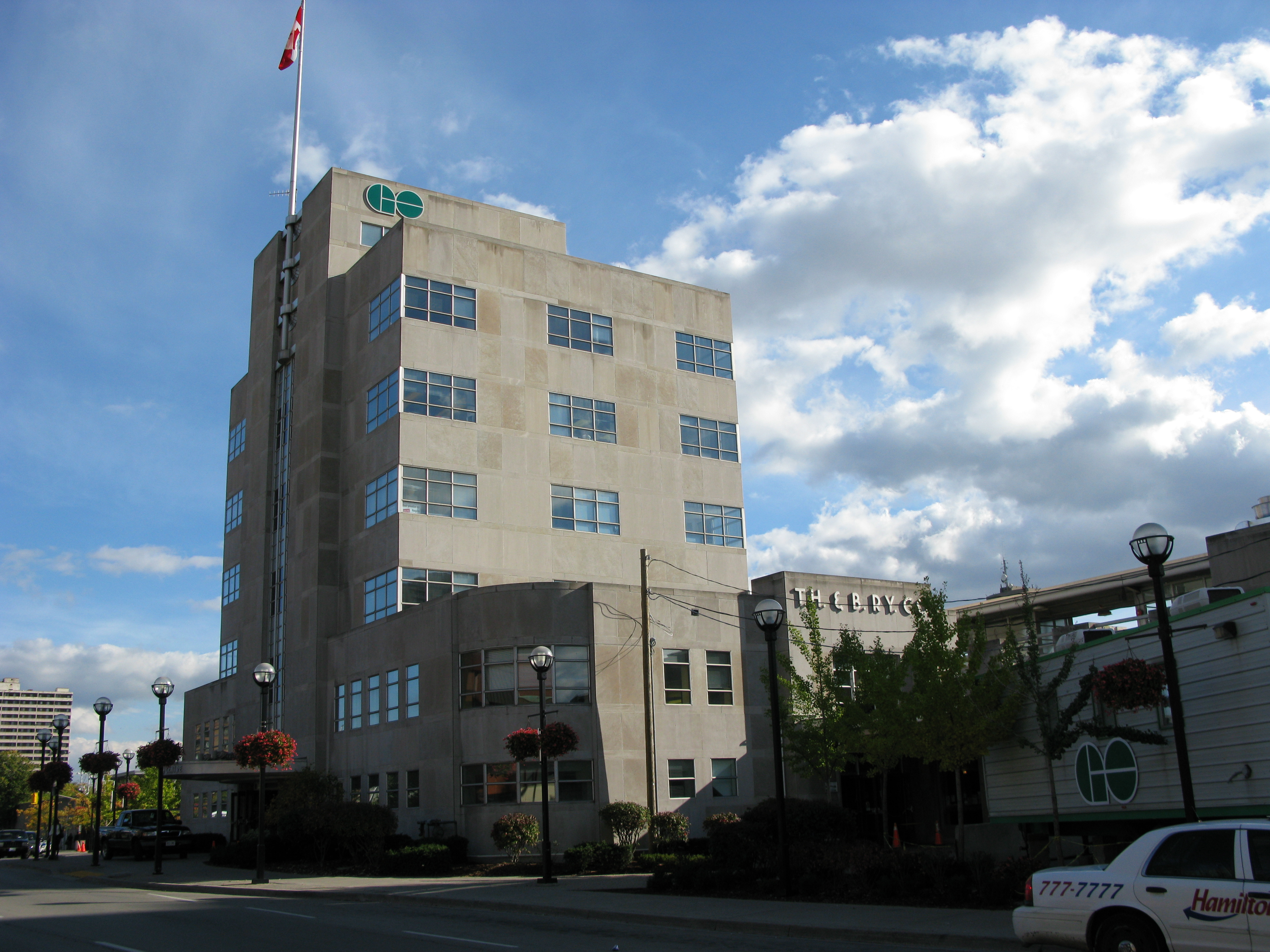
Former TH&B Hamilton station, now Hamilton GO Centre

The TH&B's second train station in Hamilton, built in 1932-1933, was the first building in Canada to adhere to the International Style. The station was refurbished in 1996 and is now used by GO Transit for both bus and train service as the Hamilton GO Centre.

The TH&B's Brantford station at 60 Market Street South, was converted to use as a restaurant in 1970 but is currently vacant and boarded up. In 2019, despite objections by the building's owner, a property developer, City Council approved a historical designation for the oldest portions of the former railway station.

The TH&B's Smithville station was originally built in 1895. However, the station was struck by lightning and burned down. A new station was constructed around 1903. The structure was restored in 1996 and is now the headquarters of the West Lincoln Historical Society. It is open seasonally as a tourist information centre.

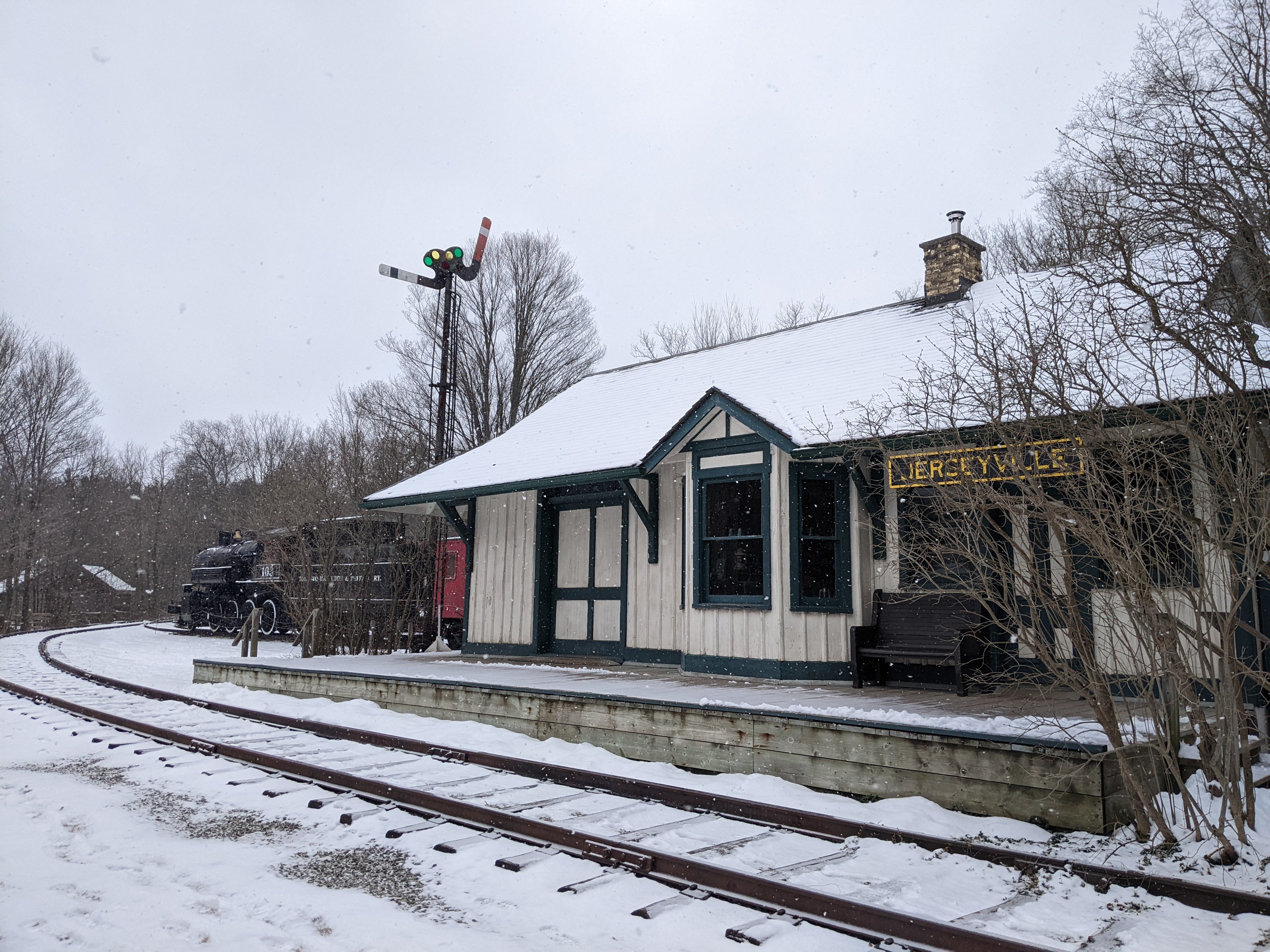
TH&B Jerseyville station and TH&B steam locomotive #103 in their new permanent location at Westfield Heritage Village

The TH&B's Jerseyville station is now at the Westfield Heritage Village, near Rockton, Ontario, alongside preserved TH&B steam locomotive #103, which was moved to this site in 1977 after being on display in Gage Park since 1956.

TH&B Stoney Creek Ststion and Viewmount Station were moved and merged into a single residential home at 106 Middleton Road in Hamilton.

== Perce Hankinson ==
Perce Hankinson, who began his railway career in 1917 with the Michigan Central Railroad (MCR), realized a lifelong dream when made Vice-President and General Manager of the TH&B on June 7, 1965. He retired five years later after 53 years of working for the railroad, only to return to the TH&B the next year and then spend another 16 years on the Board of Directors. Hankinson retired from the board June 2, 1987, at the age of 85, after 68 years of railway service. In 2001, Perce Hankinson was inducted into the North America Railway Hall of Fame in the category of "Local: Railway Workers & Builders."

== Diesel locomotives ==
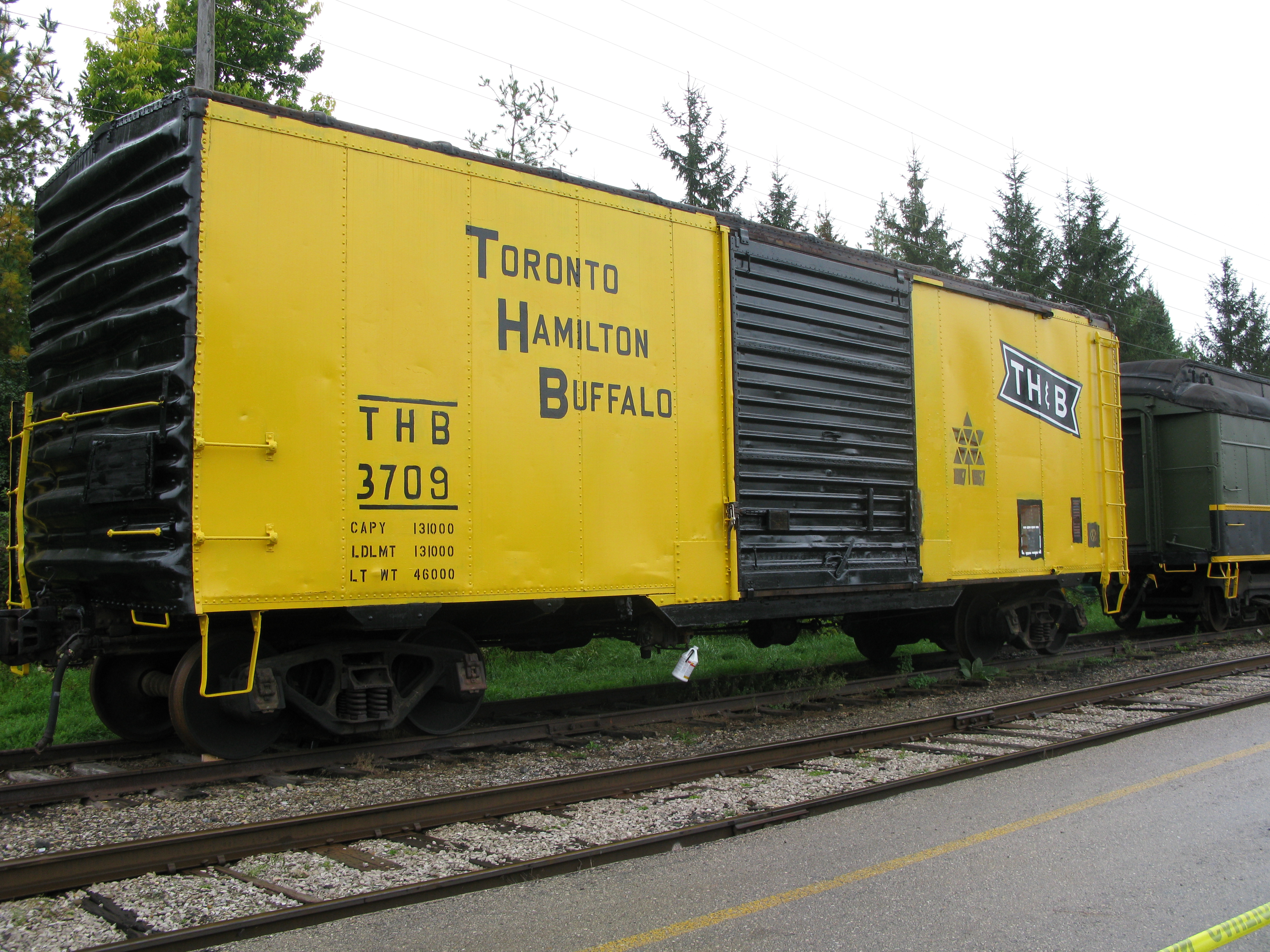
TH&B car undergoing restoration in St. Jacobs, Ontario

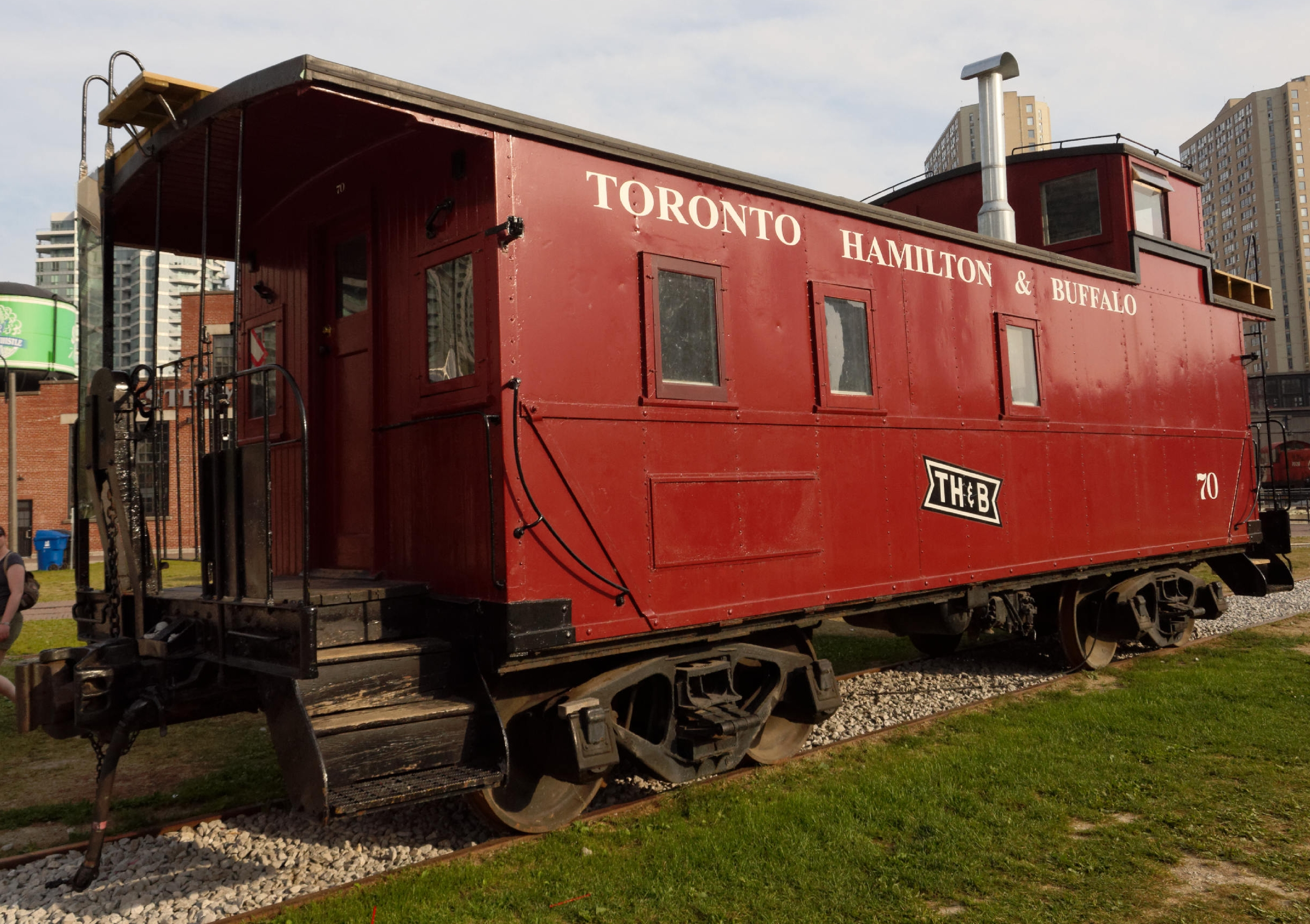
Caboose on display at Roundhouse Park in Toronto

The TH&B was one of the first railways in Canada that fully dieselized. Starting in January 1948, the railway purchased four NW2 diesel switchers from General Motors Electro-Motive Division. The locomotives were numbered 51-54. In the fall of 1950, the TH&B received an order of four GP7 road switchers built by GMD in London. The GP7s were the first Canadian-built "Geeps" and were numbered 71-74. In December 1950, the TH&B took a second group from GMD for four SW9 switchers. With its switcher fleet complete, the TH&B looked to add to its freight Geeps. In the summer of 1953, the final three GP7s were purchased from GMD and numbered 75-77. Still needing to commit motive power to the locomotive pool for through Toronto-Buffalo passenger service, the TH&B purchased three GP9s locomotives, which were delivered in early 1954 and numbered 401-403. That completed the railway's diesel fleet, and the TH&B did not purchase any new motive power for the remainder of its operating years.

However, some existing steam trains remained in service until the late 1950s. Engine 102 was frequently used in Work Train Service until its retirement in September 1959 and #42 was held for standby yard service until it was retired in December 1958. Engine 42, restored in 1998, is now on display in Lindsay Memorial Park, in Lindsay, Ontario. Unfortunately, its wooden caboose was destroyed by arson in 2008.

== TH&B Navigation Company ==
The TH&B Navigation Company operated a car float from Port Maitland, Ontario, to Ashtabula, Ohio.

http://www.thbrailway.ca/general/thbnavigation.htm

== Cultural references ==
In his song "Under a Stormy Sky" (from the 1989 album Acadie), the Quebec-born singer, songwriter, and producer Daniel Lanois pays homage to the presence of TH&B locomotives during his youth:

"I hear the T.H.& B. the diesel turning, calling you and me to the city of steel, smokestack - spinning wheel come with me Bebette, oui under the stormy sky"

== Preserved locomotives ==
Image	No.	Type	Manufacturer	Serial No.	Date	Notes
	40/42	0-6-0	Montreal Locomotive Works	51510	September; 1912	Lindsay, Ontario
	103	2-8-0	Montreal Locomotive Works	48837	September; 1910	Westfield Heritage Village

== See also ==
- Hamilton and Dundas Street Railway, which granted running rights to the TH&B into Dundas, Ontario
- Hamilton–Brantford–Cambridge Trails
- List of Ontario railways
- History of rail transport in Canada
- Rail transport in Ontario
- List of defunct Canadian railways
