= Transportation in Ann Arbor, Michigan =

Transportation in Ann Arbor, Michigan is served by several highways, Amtrak and intercity bus lines, and the Ann Arbor Municipal Airport. Local public transportation is provided by Ann Arbor Area Transportation Authority (AAATA).

== Streets and roads ==
The streets in downtown Ann Arbor conform to a grid pattern, though this pattern is less common in the surrounding areas. Major roads branch out from the downtown district like spokes on a wheel to the highways surrounding the city. The city is belted by three freeways: I-94, which runs along the southern and western portion of the city; U.S. Highway 23 (US 23), which primarily runs along the eastern edge of Ann Arbor; and M-14, which runs along the northern edge of the city. Other nearby highways include US 12 (Michigan Ave.), M-17 (Washtenaw Ave.), and M-153 (Ford Rd.).

Several of the major surface arteries lead to the I-94/M-14 interchange in the west, US 23 in the east, and the city's southern areas. Over 80,000 people commute into Ann Arbor each day from surrounding areas.

== Public transportation ==
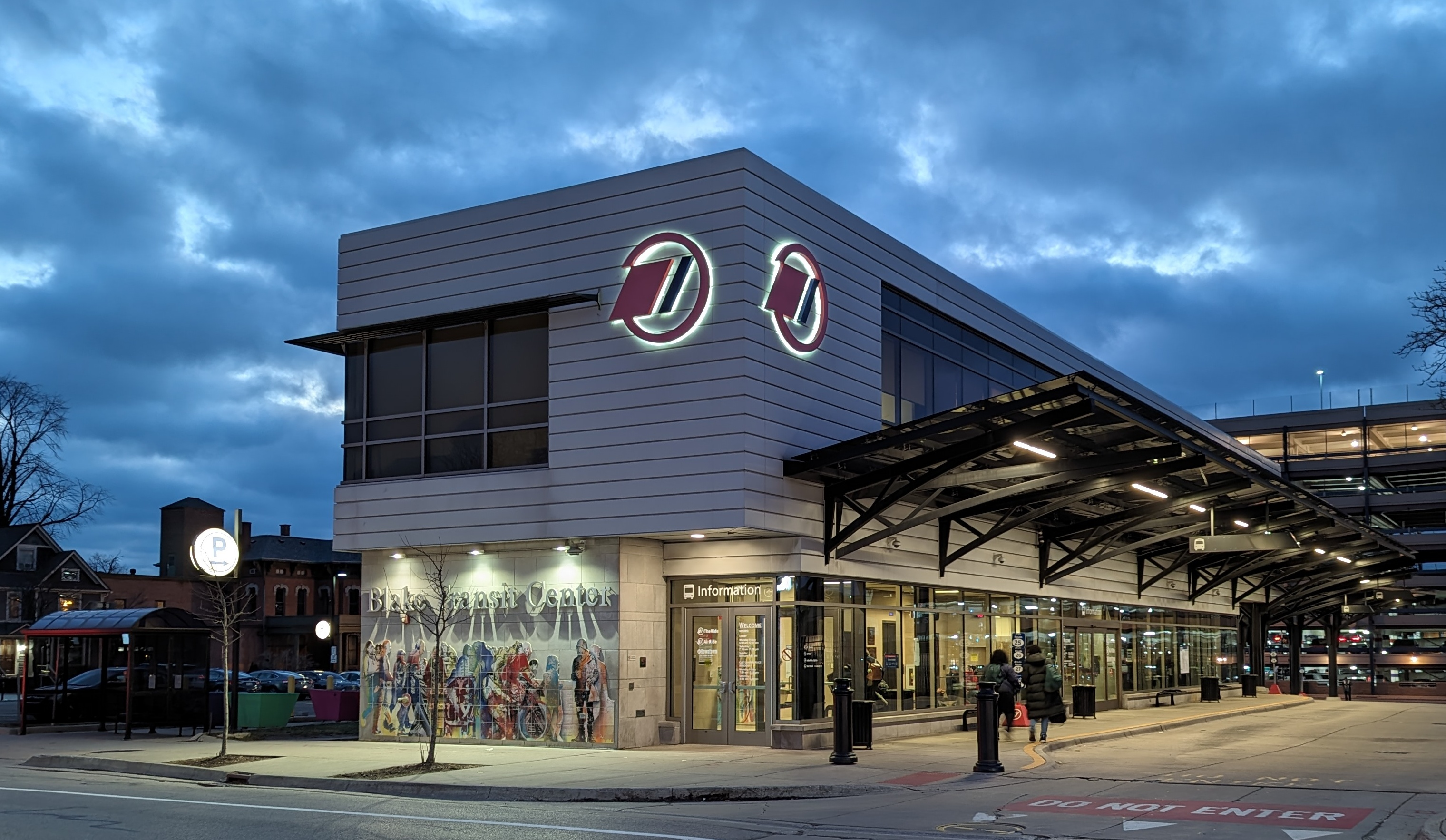
The Blake Transit Center in 2023

The Ann Arbor Area Transportation Authority (AAATA), which brands itself as "TheRide", operates public bus services throughout the city and nearby Ypsilanti. The AAATA operates the Blake Transit Center on Fourth Ave. in downtown Ann Arbor, and the Ypsilanti Transit Center.

University of Michigan Transit operates bus services within and between the University of Michigan campuses, which also serve the Ann Arbor facilities of Michigan Medicine. Since April 2012, the AirRide express bus service connects the Blake Transit Center to Detroit Metro Airport a dozen times a day.

== Intercity buses ==
Greyhound Lines provides intercity bus service. The Michigan Flyer, a service operated by Indian Trails, cooperates with AAATA for their AirRide and additionally offers bus service to East Lansing. Megabus has direct service to Chicago, Illinois, while a bus service is provided by Amtrak Thruway for rail passengers making connections to services in East Lansing and Toledo, Ohio.

== Walking and cycling ==
Ann Arbor is considered one of the US's most walkable cities, with one sixth of Ann Arborites walking to work according to the 2020 census. Ann Arbor has a gold designation by the Walk Friendly Communities program. Since 2011, the city's property taxes have included a provision for sidewalk maintenance and expansions, expanding the sidewalk network, filling sidewalk gaps, and repairing existing sidewalks. The city has created a sidewalk gap dashboard, which showed 143 miles of sidewalk gaps in May 2022. The outlying parts of the city and the township districts between Ann Arbor and Ypsilanti still contain markedly unwalkable areas.

In 2019, 36% of trips in Ann Arbor were taken by walking, biking or transit. In 2020, the city introduced a Healthy Streets program to encourage non-motorized transportation. Between 2019 and 2022 Ann Arbor's Downtown Development Authority built four two-way protected bikeways downtown. Early studies have shown a significant increase in bicycle use downtown since the construction of these bikeways. In 2023, the city reported over 900 bicycle parking spaces downtown, though this is still a small portion compared to the over 8,000 car parking spots for cars.

The Washtenaw County Border-to-Border Trail connects Ann Arbor to Ypsilanti, mostly along the Huron River, for pedestrians, bicycles and other non-motorized transportation. In 2017, Spin scooters started providing a scooter share program in Ann Arbor, expanding this to include dockless e-bikes in 2023.

== Railroads ==
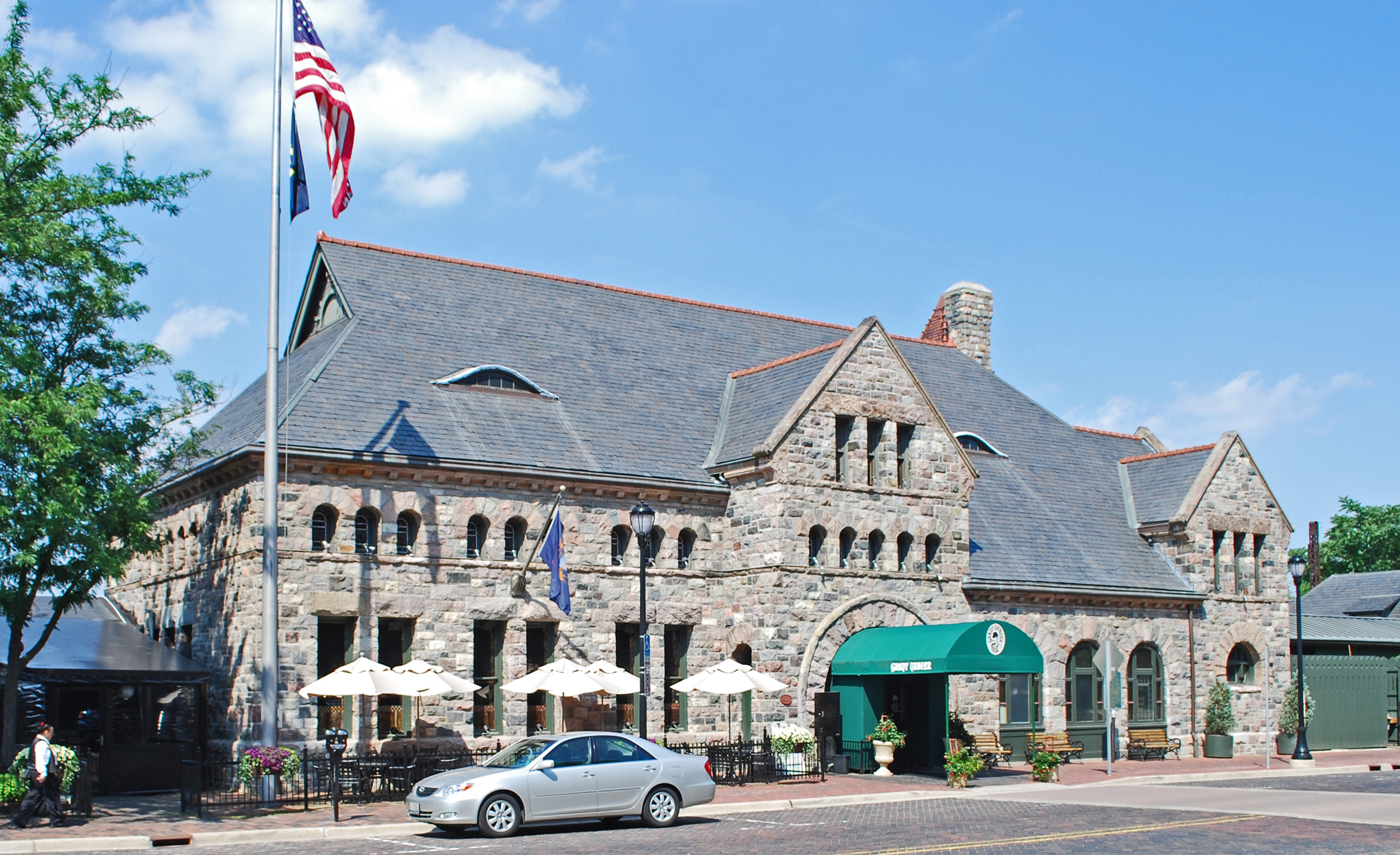
Michigan Central Depot, Ann Arbor

The city was a major rail hub, notably for freight traffic between Toledo and ports north of Chicago, Illinois, from 1878 to 1982; however, the Ann Arbor Railroad also provided passenger service from 1878 to 1950, going northwest to Frankfort and Elberta on Lake Michigan and southeast to Toledo. (In Elberta connections to ferries across the Lake could be made.) The city was served by the Michigan Central Railroad starting in 1837. The Ann Arbor and Ypsilanti Street Railway, Michigan's first interurban, served the city from 1891 to 1929.

Amtrak, which provides service to the city at the Ann Arbor Train Station, operates the Wolverine train between Chicago and Pontiac, via Detroit. The present-day train station neighbors the city's old Michigan Central Depot, which was renovated as a restaurant in 1970.
