= Arborland Center =

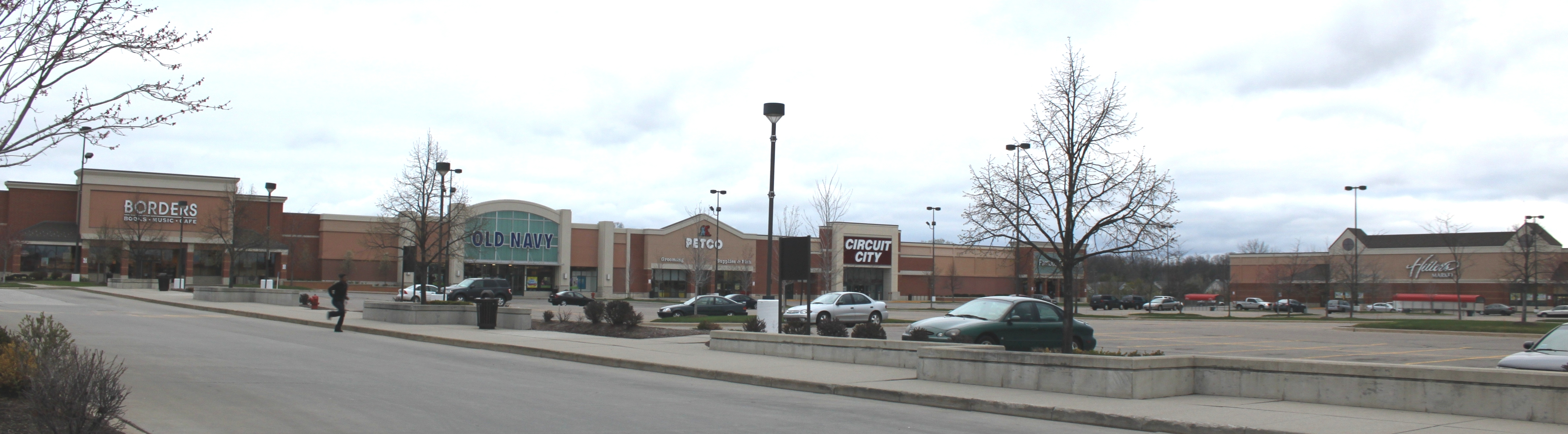
- Location: Ann Arbor, Michigan, United States
- Coordinates: 42°15′21.8″N 83°41′15.2″W
- Opened: 1961, redeveloped 1998
- Closed: 1998 (original mall only)
- Developer: Taubman Centers (original mall); Simon Property Group (1980s mall)
- Owner: Brixmor Property Group
- Num. of stores: 26
- Num. of anchor tenants: 7
- Floor area: 406,736 sq ft (37,787.0 m^{2})
- Floors: 1
- Public transit: AAATA 4, 66, 67, 104

Arborland Center is a shopping center located in Ann Arbor, Michigan, United States. Opened in 1961 as an unenclosed shopping mall, the center was redeveloped as a power center in 1998. Current anchor stores include Marshalls, Petco, Kroger, Ulta, Old Navy, Gardner-White Furniture (that used to be a Toys "R" Us), and Bed Bath & Beyond.

== History ==
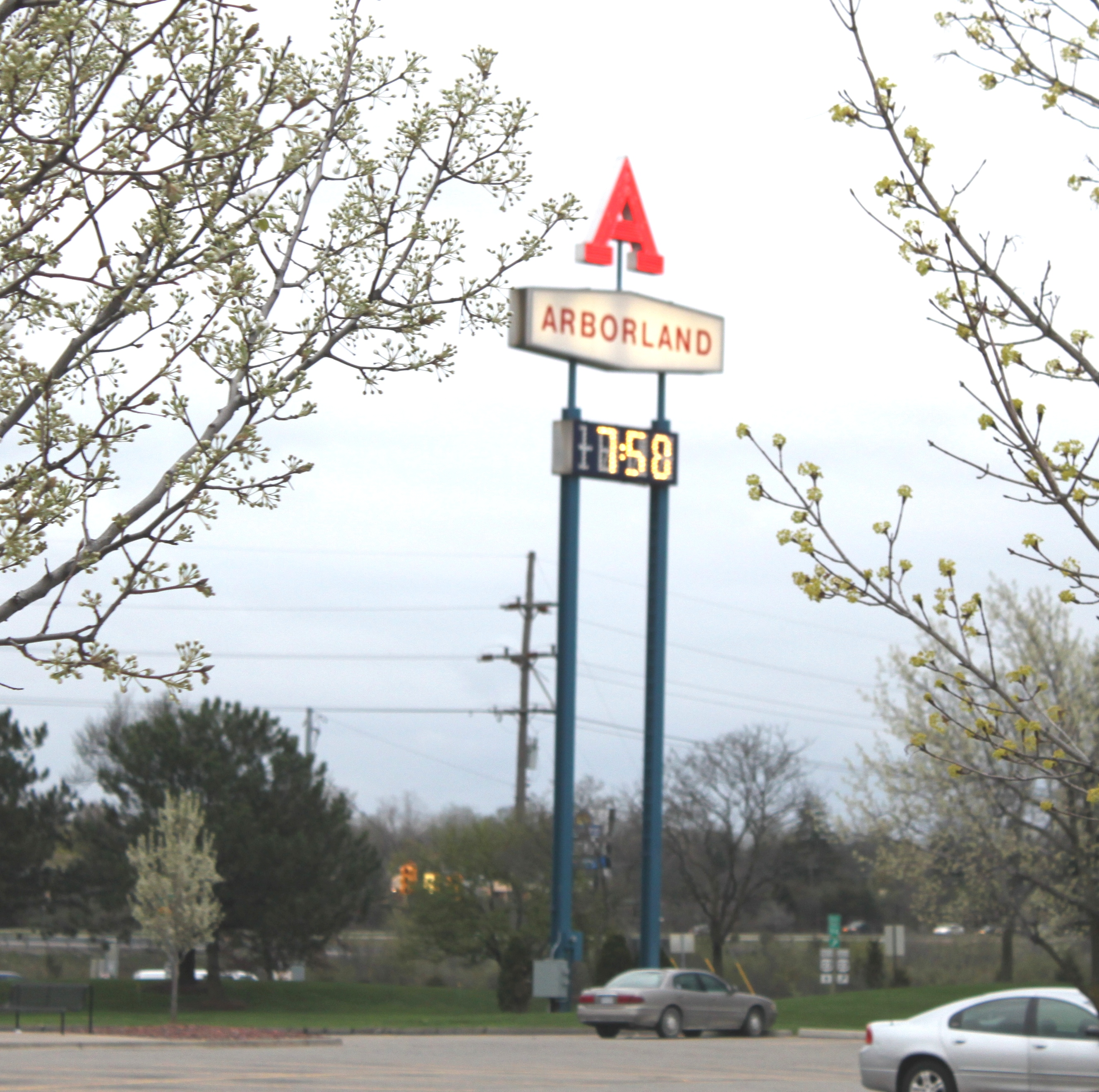
Arborland sign on Washtenaw Ave.

Arborland was Ann Arbor's first suburban mall, opened in the early 1960s. The original Arborland featured JCPenney, Kresge, Kroger, and Montgomery Ward among its anchor stores. In 1973, the larger Briarwood Mall opened, and JCPenney moved to a newer store there. Competition from Briarwood caused Arborland to lose tenants throughout the end of the 1970s. E.N. Maisel & Associates purchased the mall in 1980 and enclosed its formerly open-air concourses, while replacing the vacated JCPenney store with Crowley's. Despite these additions, the mall continued to lose tenants, including Montgomery Ward, Sibley's Shoes, and Pearle Vision in early 1983.

Melvin Simon & Associates (now Simon Property Group) began renovations on converting the mall to discount and outlet stores in 1983, which necessitated closing of the Crowley's store as it was incompatible with the discount format. At the time of Simon's purchase, the center had only 13 tenants. Simon attracted over 45 new stores, including new anchor stores Burlington Coat Factory, Service Merchandise, F&M, Toys "R" Us, and Marshalls, along with a food court.

In the late 1990s Freed and Associates purchased it on the cheap and razed most of the structure, transforming it into a big box cluster. Toys "R" Us was rebuilt during the "de-malling" of the center, while Marshalls and the former F&M building (now occupied by OfficeMax) were retained. Freed's purchase price was around $6 million; within a decade, in 2005, Freed was said to be seeking a buyer for over $100 million. Freed did shortly find a buyer for the 409,000 sq ft (38,000 m^{2}) center. The facility was purchased by AmCap, through a joint venture with Los Angeles-based Hart Realty Advisers for a reported $102 million.

The Borders in Arborland closed in April 2011. A year later, its space was split between Five Below and Ulta. Nordstrom Rack was confirmed in 2013 for a space vacated by Circuit City in 2009.
