= Blake Transit Center =

Bus station in Ann Arbor, Michigan, USA

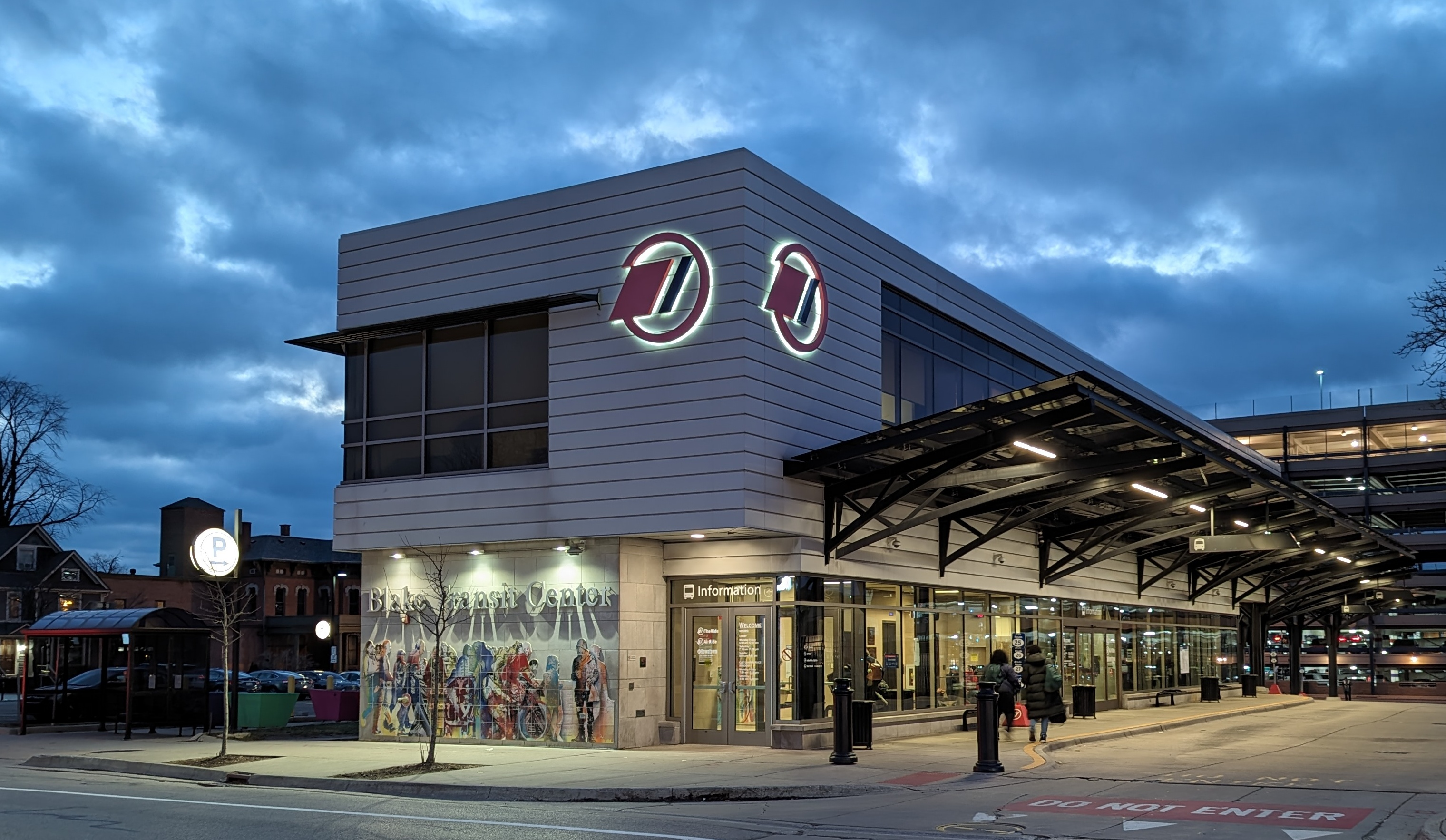

General information
- Location: 328 S 5th Avenue; Ann Arbor, Michigan; United States
- Coordinates: 42.2784°N 83.7465°W
- Owner: Ann Arbor Area Transportation Authority
- Bus routes: 3, 4, 5, 6, 22, 23, 24, 25, 26, 27, 28, 29, 30, 31, 32, 33, 34, 104
- Bus stands: 11
- Bus operators: TheRide
- Connections: D2A2; Michigan Flyer; Indian Trails

Construction
- Structure type: At-grade
- Accessible: Yes

Other information
- Status: Temporarily Closed

History
- Opened: 1987 (original); July 7, 2014 (current)
- Rebuilt: 2012-2014
Location

The Blake Transit Center (BTC) is a major public transit station in downtown Ann Arbor, Michigan. It is the main hub for TheRide, serving as the terminus and transfer point for 17 Ann Arbor-based routes in the system's hub-and-spoke bus network. It also serves as a transfer point for multiple intercity bus services.

The current building is the second Blake Transit Center, built in the early 2010s to replace a smaller building on the west side of the block that could no longer manage the increased utilization.

The Blake Transit Center is currently closed due to construction on 4th Avenue.

== Service ==
The Blake is the largest of the AAATA's three transit centers, serving as a destination for 17 routes. It serves as the main hub for Ann Arbor's hub-and-spoke bus transportation model. Four of these routes (3, 4, 5 and 6) connect the Blake to the smaller Ypsilanti Transit Center by various routes.

=== Regional service ===
In addition to serving local routes, the BTC is also the Ann Arbor terminus of the D2A2, an hourly express bus service to Grand Circus Park in downtown Detroit. It also serves as the Ann Arbor stop on the Michigan Flyer, an intercity service connecting to East Lansing, Brighton, and Detroit Metropolitan Airport.

Finally, the Blake is one stop for the Indian Trails line 1488, which connects to Detroit, Jackson, Lansing, Clare, Gaylord, and St. Ignace.

== History ==
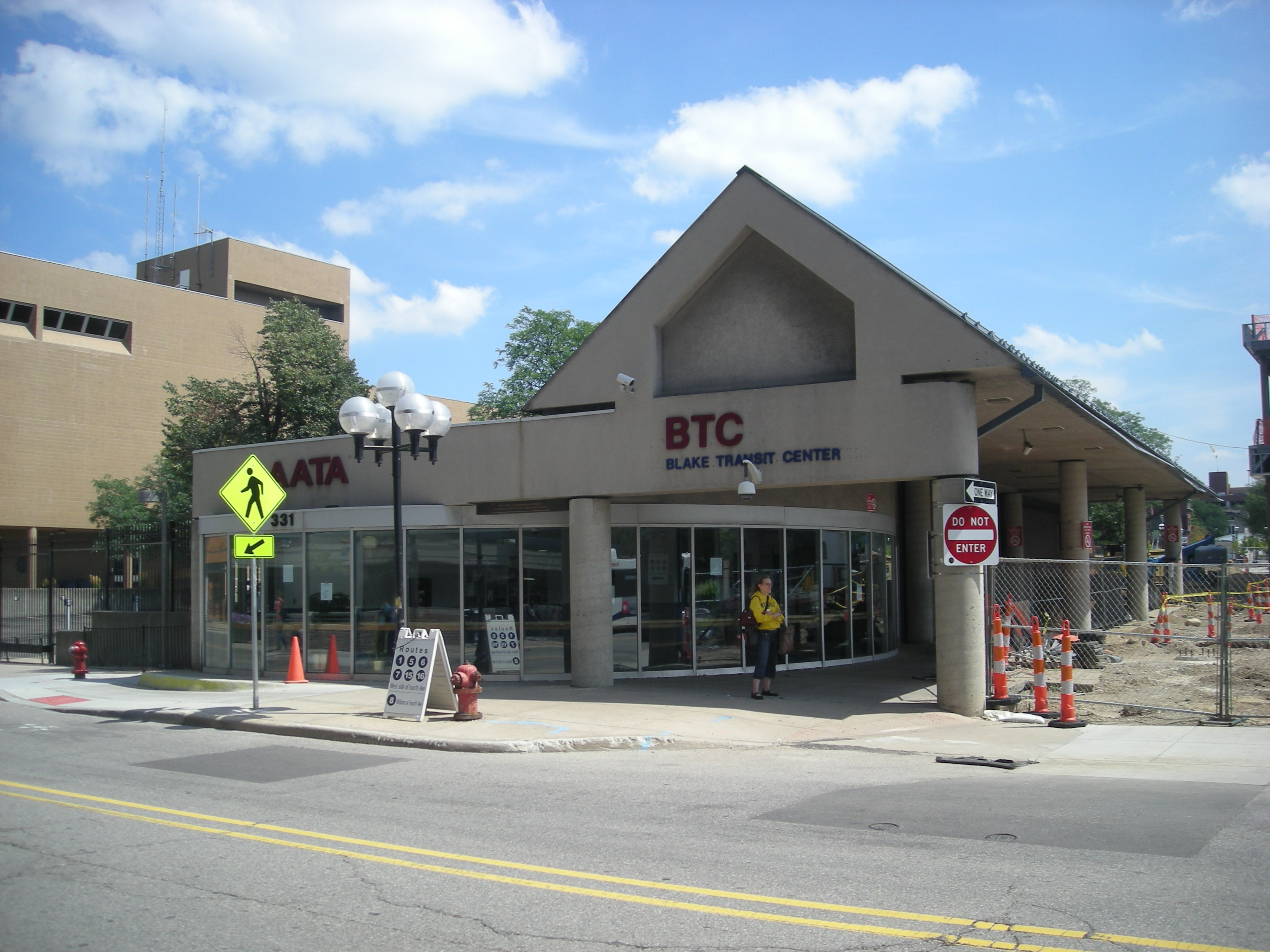
Original Blake Transit Center in 2013

The original single-floor transit center was built in 1987 for the purpose of moving bus stops off Fourth Avenue and preventing transferring riders from having to cross the street; the cost of the project was just over $1 million.

=== Naming ===
In 1989, the transit center was renamed the Blake Transit Center following the unexpected death of Richard Dumas Blake. In his time working at the AATA, Blake worked as a bus driver, the Coordinator of School Services, the Safety Director, and the Systems Manager for Marketing. Blake was well known in the community for his outreach programs including Charlie Bus, a program to teach elementary school children to ride the bus.

=== New building ===
The current version broke ground on November 19, 2012. This new building includes more modern facilities and more space, including restrooms, offices and a staff break room. The building was constructed in part due to the increase in ridership since the original building was constructed, and in part due to the increase in bus traffic, with the old building handling 40 buses per hour at its peak.

Construction of the 12,019 square foot facility cost $8.1 million. The grand opening on July 7, 2014 was attended by U.S. Representative John Dingell and Ann Arbor mayor John Hieftje, amongst other notable federal and state officials and local civic leaders.

=== Planned expansion ===
Immediately to the south of the Blake at 350 S Fifth Ave is a surface parking lot commonly called "The Y Lot" due to its history as the former site of a YMCA building that provided affordable housing in downtown Ann Arbor. Due in part to the increase in buses at the Blake, resulting in many buses stopping along Fourth Ave, the city has incorporated plans for four additional bus bays to extend the availability of off-street bus stops. The lot was sold to the Ann Arbor Housing Development Corporation in September 2023, and a Request for Proposals is open until 8 February 2024.

=== Temporary Closure ===
The BTC was temporarily closed on May 3rd, 2026 due to a construction project on 4th Avenue, that resulted in most of 4th Avenue being closed, thus also closing off access to the BTC's bus bays. Bus service has been relocated to the intersection of 5th and Washington until the BTC reopens, expected to be in Late 2026.
