= Regional Transit Authority of Southeast Michigan =

Public transit serving Detroit and Ann Arbor

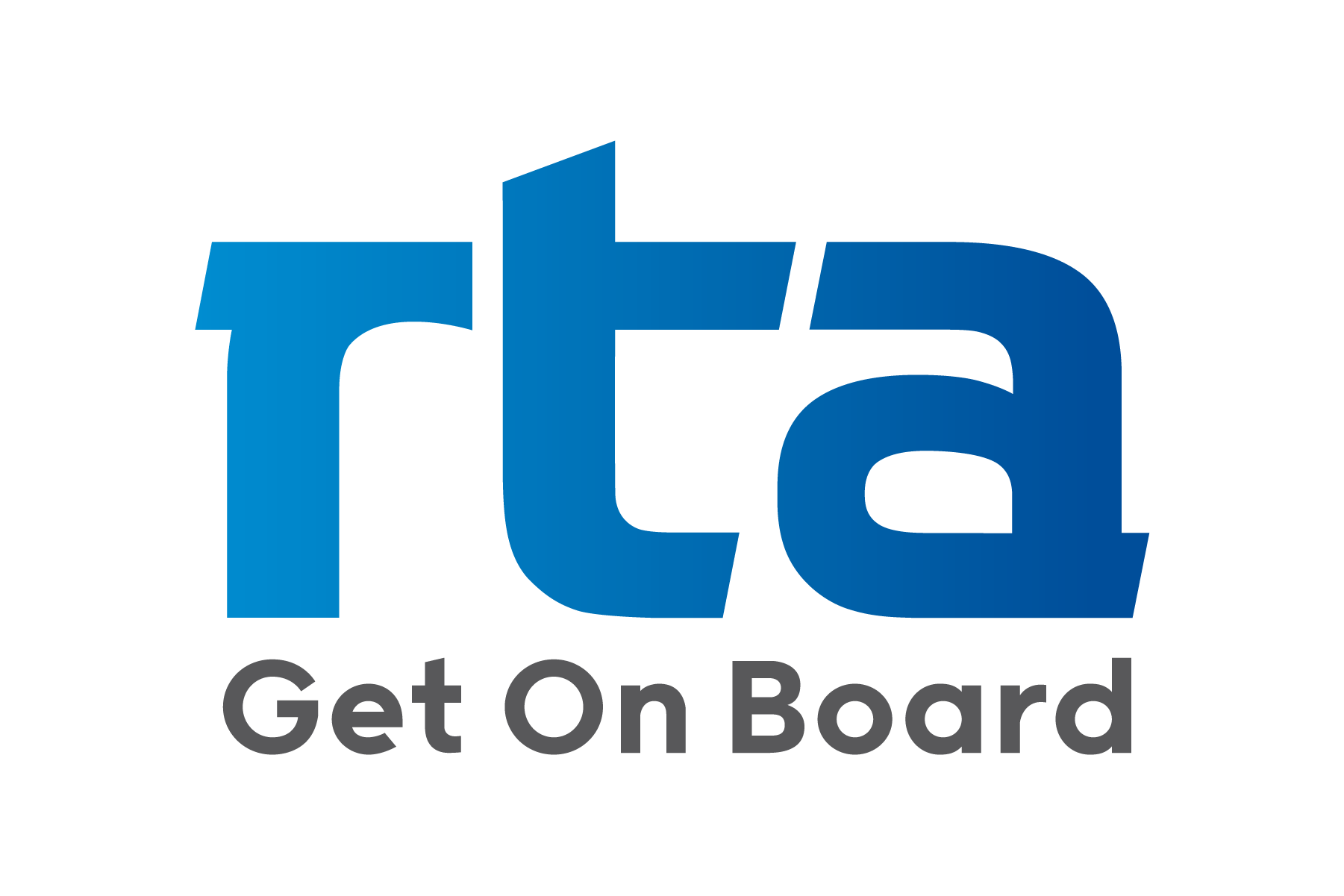

Overview
- Locale: Metro Detroit and Ann Arbor
- Transit type: Express bus Streetcar
- Chief executive: Ben Stupka, Executive Director
- Headquarters: 1001 Woodward Avenue, Suite 1400; Detroit, Michigan, U.S.
- Website: rtamichigan.org

Operation
- Began operation: 2013
- Operators: DDOT; SMART; TheRide; Detroit People Mover

The Regional Transit Authority of Southeast Michigan (RTA) is a public transit agency serving Metro Detroit and the Ann Arbor area in the U.S. state of Michigan. It operates the QLINE streetcar in Detroit, and coordinates and oversees the public transit services operated by DDOT, SMART, TheRide, and the Detroit People Mover. Its operating area covers the counties of Macomb, Oakland, Washtenaw, and Wayne.

== Governance ==
The RTA is governed by a 10-member board of directors, which includes two representatives from each county and one representative from Detroit appointed by the county executives, county commission chair of Washtenaw County, and Mayor of Detroit, respectively. Additionally, one non-voting representative is appointed by the governor; this member chairs the board. Board members serve staggered three-year terms, and may be reappointed. Since members are permitted to serve until a successor is appointed, in effect, they may serve beyond a three-year term. They may not be a current elected official, employee of a county or city in the region, nor an employee of a transportation provider in the region. The board may employ a CEO to oversee the day-to-day operations of the authority.

Board of Directors members
Jurisdiction	Member
City of Detroit	Freman Hendrix
Macomb County	Jon Moore
Macomb County	Don Morandini
Oakland County	Jeanette Bradshaw
Oakland County	Helaine Zack
Washtenaw County	Ned Staebler
Washtenaw County	Alma Wheeler Smith
Wayne County	June Lee
Wayne County	Erica Robertson
Governor of Michigan	Dave Massaron

=== Powers ===
The board is granted the authority with a 7/9 supermajority of the voting members - including at least one member from each jurisdiction - the power to:

- determine the rate of and place on the ballot a levy of an assessment for the funding of transit services and operations.
- determine the rate of and place on the ballot a vehicle registration tax for the funding of transit services and operations.
- determine to acquire the QLine, and acquire, construct or operate planned commuter rail services in the region.

The board is granted the authority with unanimous consent the power to:

- determine to acquire, construct or operate rail passenger service in the region.
- determine to acquire a public transit provider in the region upon a vote of the electors of each jurisdiction.
- place on the ballot a question of assuming liability or paying legacy costs of an acquired public transportation provider.

Elections for the question of the levy of assessments and vehicle registration tax increases can only be held in a presidential election year on the date of the presidential primary election.

== Transit operations ==
=== Streetcar service ===
The RTA owns and operates the QLINE, a streetcar system serving the Downtown, Midtown, and New Center areas of the city of Detroit.

=== Express bus services ===
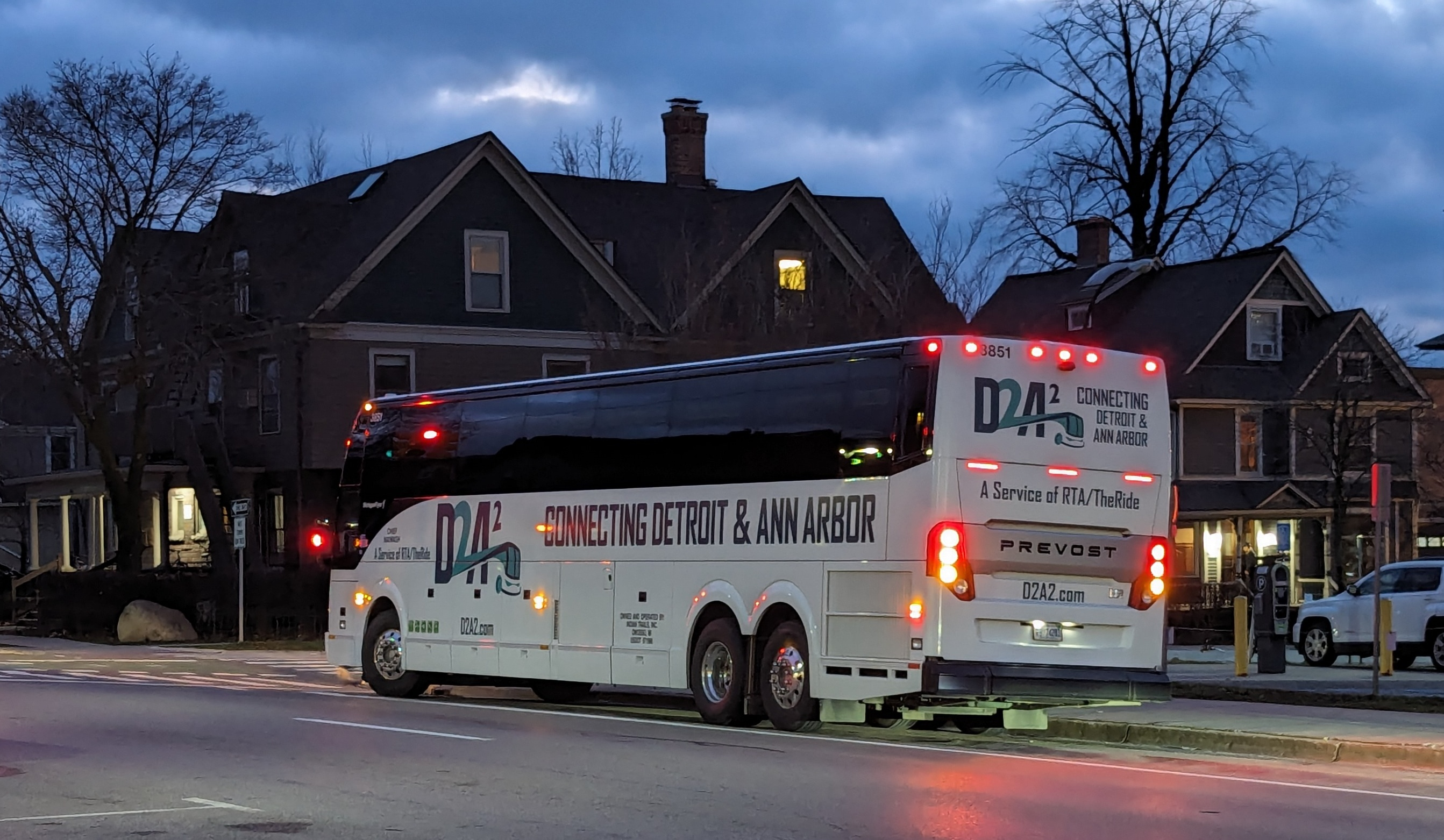
D2A2 coach at Blake Transit Center in downtown Ann Arbor

The Detroit to Ann Arbor Express (D2A2) is an express intercity bus service between Detroit and Ann Arbor, offered in partnership with TheRide. D2A2 runs directly from Grand Circus Park in downtown Detroit to the Blake Transit Center in downtown Ann Arbor, with no intermediate stops. The service operates hourly on weekdays, and every 1½ to two hours on weekends. D2A2 service began in March 2020.

The Detroit Air Xpress (DAX) is a non-stop express bus service connecting downtown Detroit with Detroit Metropolitan Airport. It runs every 60–90 minutes from 3:30 a.m. to 11 p.m., seven days a week, serving Downtown Detroit via a stop on Washington Boulevard near the Rosa Parks Transit Center. DAX began service on March 25, 2024.

D2A2 and DAX are operated by Indian Trails under contract. A single ride on either route costs $6 when reserved online in advance, or $8 when purchased onboard; for frequent commuters, a pack of 50 tickets for is available for $100. Luggage can be transported on both services for no additional charge.

== History ==
The RTA has its beginnings in the Metropolitan Transportation Authorities Act of 1967 (Public Act 204). A provision of the act specifically created the Southeastern Michigan Transportation Authority (SEMTA), but provided the authority with no additional means to levy taxes or fees to fund the operations for the transit providers it had acquired.

In 1974, facing a loss of funding from SEMTA and wanting more control of its transit affairs, Detroit's Department of Street Railways (DSR) restructured itself as the Detroit Department of Transportation (DDOT). On December 7, 1988, Public Act 204 was amended to restructure SEMTA, reducing the service area from seven counties to three, and excluding the city of Detroit. The new transit authority was named the Suburban Mobility Authority for Regional Transit (SMART), and began operation on January 17, 1989. To continue limited coordination and development of services between DDOT and SMART, however, regional leaders representing the three-county area and Detroit filed articles of incorporation to form the Regional Transit Coordinating Council on January 12, 1989.

On December 19, 2012 Governor Rick Snyder signed Senate Bill No. 909 into law establishing the Regional Transit Authority (RTA), which included a provision allowing for the first time a way for such a regional transit authority to fund itself. Almost one month later, US Transportation Secretary Ray LaHood announced that the M-1 Rail Line would receive US$25 million in federal funding as he had previously indicated such support was dependent on the creation of a regional transit authority for the Detroit region.

Along with oversight and coordination responsibilities for the Detroit Department of Transportation, Suburban Mobility Authority for Regional Transportation, Ann Arbor Area Transportation Authority, and the Detroit Transportation Corporation, the authority was also established to create a single mass transit plan for the region, including the development, funding and operation of rapid transit along four major corridors in the metropolitan area. The new plan used as its basis the Comprehensive Regional Transit Service Plan, which was adopted on December 8, 2008. The RTA chose HNTB to assist in the development of the Regional Master Transit Plan in 2015.

=== Limited-stop services ===
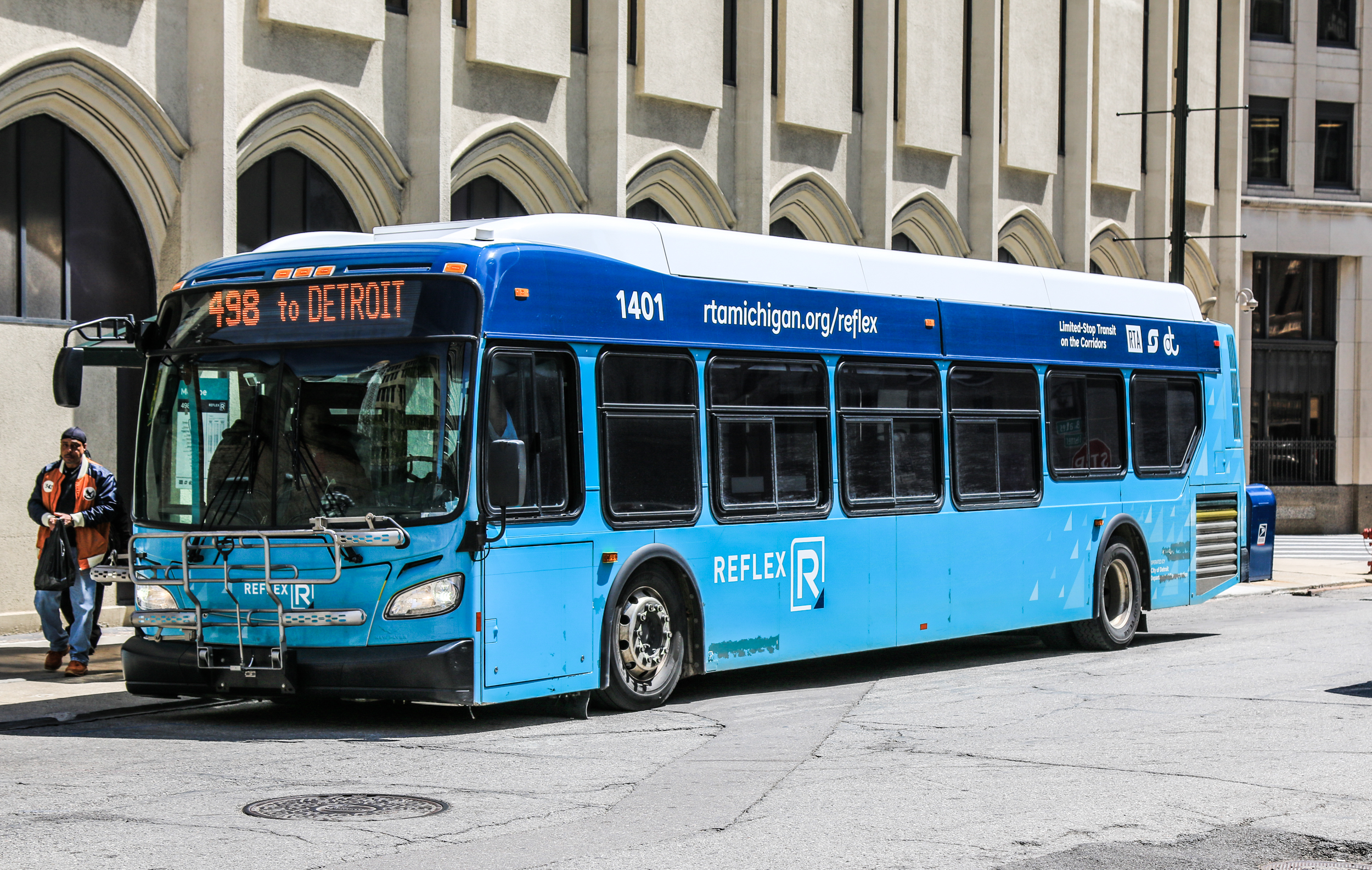
RefleX route 498, operated by DDOT, pictured in 2017

From 2016 to 2018, the RTA coordinated RefleX, a limited-stop bus service on Woodward and Gratiot Avenues, connecting Detroit with suburbs in Oakland and Macomb counties. RefleX started operation on Labor Day weekend in 2016. The Woodward route, operated by DDOT, ran to a northern terminus at Somerset Collection in Troy, while two Gratiot routes, operated by SMART, ran from Mount Clemens to termini in Downtown and Midtown Detroit. RefleX was discontinued in early 2018, and replaced by SMART's similar FAST network.

=== Pilot express services ===
The RTA launched its first express service, the D2A2, on March 16, 2020; service was reduced soon thereafter due to the COVID-19 pandemic.

=== QLINE operation ===
In September 2024, the RTA took over ownership and operation of the QLINE. Full integration of the system into RTA is expected by October 2024.

== Projects ==
In early 2015, the RTA retained Parsons Brinckerhoff and AECOM to study improved mass transit along the corridors of Gratiot and Michigan avenues. The authority also took over oversight of the Woodward Avenue Alternative Analysis Rapid Transit Alternative study, which found BRT (bus rapid transit) as the locally preferred alternative as the improved mode of transit along a 27-mile stretch of Woodward Avenue. The master plan was officially presented to the media and public on May 31, 2016 with highlights including plans for:

- 4 bus rapid transit along major corridors.
- 8 round-trip regional rail service connecting Ann Arbor and Detroit.
- 11 cross-county connector routes
- 4 commuter express bus routes connecting employment centers.
- 5 express bus routes connecting to Detroit Metropolitan Airport.
- New and extended existing local bus routes.
- Increased paratransit services.

The plan was approved by the board on August 4, 2016 with the $4.7 billion plan to go voters for approval on November 8, 2016. The measure failed by a 50.5% to 49.5% margin, with 895,877 voting in favor of the proposal, and 913,856 in opposition. The proposal passed in the counties of Wayne and Washtenaw, but very narrowly lost in Oakland and was defeated handily in Macomb.

== See also ==
- Transportation in metropolitan Detroit
