= Ypsilanti Transit Center =

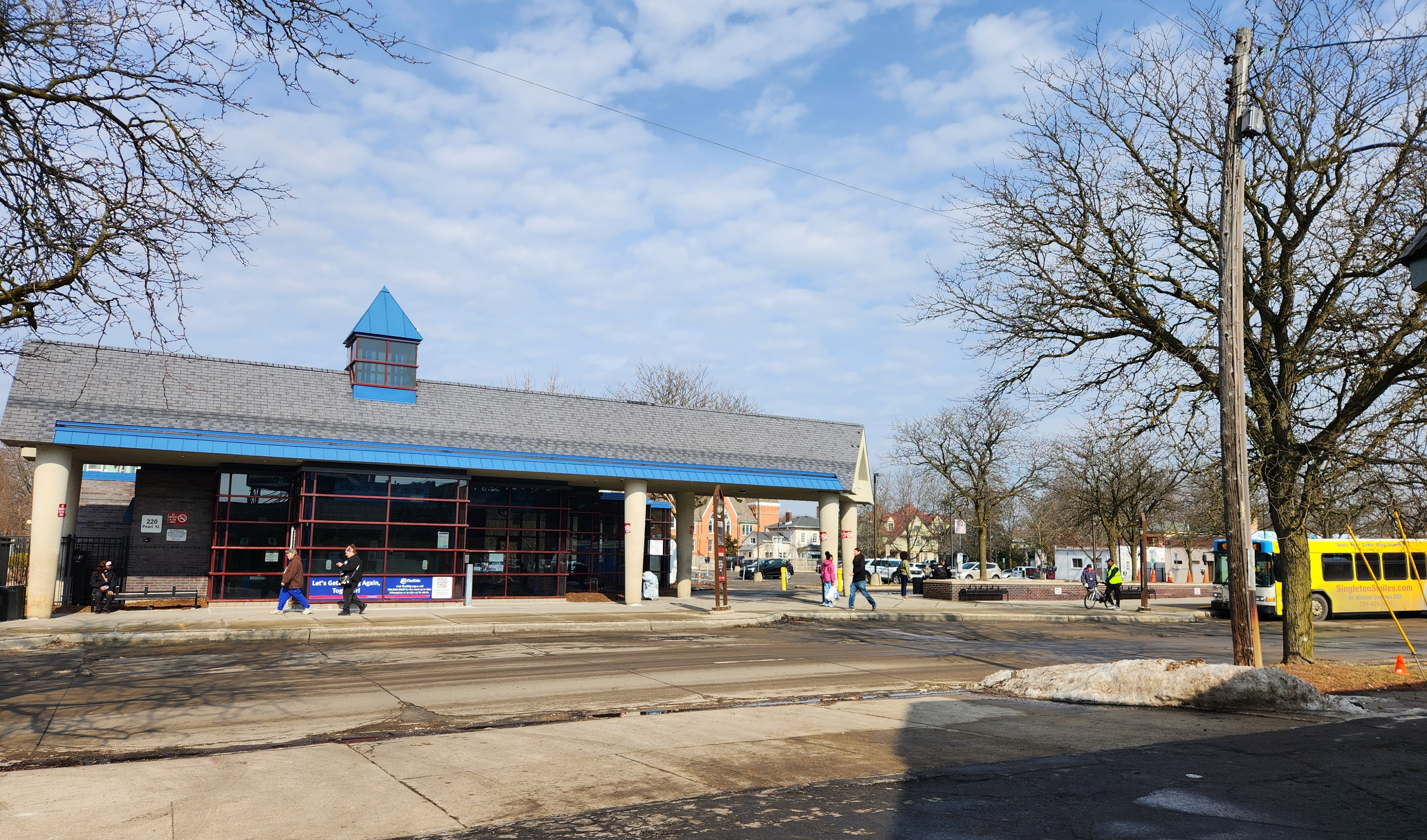

General information
- Location: 220 Pearl St, Ypsilanti, Michigan, U.S.
- Coordinates: 42.24239°N 83.61578°W
- System: Ann Arbor Area Transportation Authority
- Bus routes: 11 (as of 2026)
- Bus stands: 6

History
- Opened: 1993
Location

The Ypsilanti Transit Center (YTC) is the main bus station in Ypsilanti, Michigan, serving as a hub for Ann Arbor Area Transportation Authority (TheRide) bus services. It serves approximately 101,000 bus arrivals and departures per year, providing the primary service hub for the 8.8% of Ypsilanti residents who commute by transit.

== Services ==
As of 2026, the Ypsilanti Transit Center is served by 11 TheRide bus routes, connecting to destinations in Ypsilanti, Ann Arbor, Ypsilanti Township, Superior Township, and Pittsfield Township. The Ypsilanti Transit Center is one of two major hubs for TheRide's network, along with the Blake Transit Center in downtown Ann Arbor.

For a long time, the AAATA lacked the staff necessary to staff the information window at the YTC. However, thanks in part to a new property tax approved in August 2022, the YTC got full-time staffing for the information desk beginning on 1 August 2023. These staff sell tokens and passes to riders in addition to answering questions and providing information. The transit center also includes an indoor waiting area and restrooms.

== History ==
The Ypsilanti Transit Center was constructed and opened in 1993 to serve as a central hub for the growing transit network in eastern Washtenaw County. The project was developed as a joint partnership between the City of Ypsilanti, Eastern Michigan University (EMU), and the Ann Arbor Area Transportation Authority (AAATA). The facility's footprint was established through a shared land-ownership arrangement that remains in place today. The AAATA owns the parcels on the southeast and southwest corners of the site, while the City of Ypsilanti maintains ownership of the land between those parcels as well as the surface parking lot directly to the north.

For over three decades, the original 1993 facility operated as TheRide's secondary regional hub, working in tandem with the Blake Transit Center in downtown Ann Arbor. The original footprint included an indoor customer lobby, driver facilities, and a security office. It was built with six dedicated bus bays, utilizing lay-by spaces on North Washington Street for shuttles and overflow.

== Expansion project ==
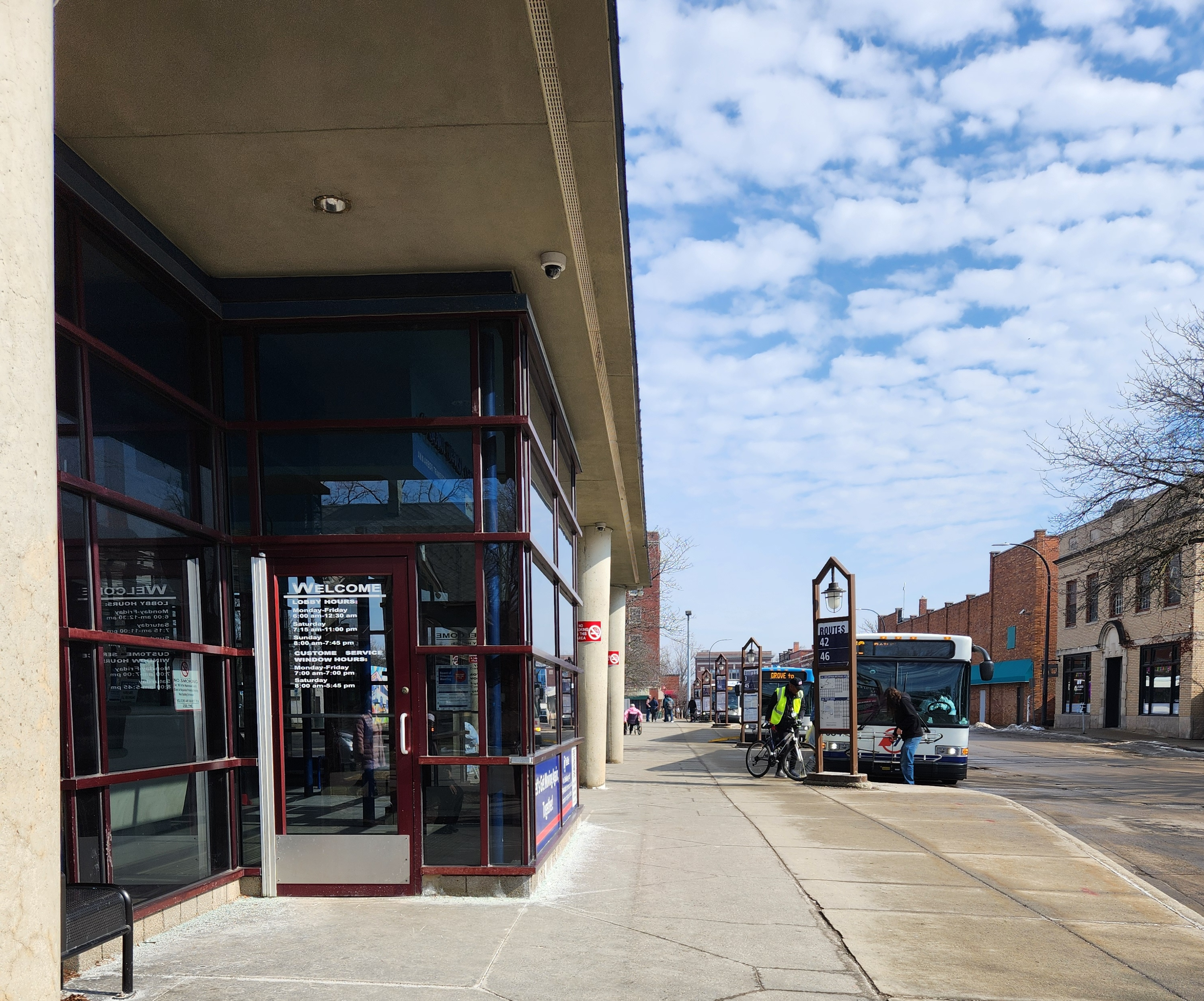
Buses at the transit center in 2026

In 2017, the AAATA started work on a project to improve the YTC, coordinated as part of TheRide 2045 long-term planning project. In January 2023, Rep. Debbie Dingell announced a $7 million allocation of federal funds towards the construction of a new terminal. By early 2026, federal funding commitments for the project reached nearly $8 million, bolstered by additional planning funds secured by U.S. Senator Gary Peters.

Following a public engagement period in early 2024, TheRide finalized a design concept to build a new, single-story, 6,700-square-foot facility on the east end of the transit center block. This footprint was selected to preserve the existing historic commercial structures on adjacent Adams Street and Washington Street. The new design expands capacity from six to ten standard and high-capacity bus stands, and incorporates multimodal features such as expanded bike parking and ride-share drop-off areas.

To prepare for the new facility, TheRide submitted an application to demolish the original 1993 transit center building at 220 Pearl Street. Because the property is subject to local historic zoning rules, the Ypsilanti Historic District Commission (HDC) reviewed the demolition request in the summer of 2026. In June 2026, the HDC temporarily paused the demolition permit to gather further details regarding the site transition plan, culminating in a public hearing on July 14, 2026, to formally evaluate the site's future.
