= Cora V. Taylor =

American businesswoman

- Born: March 1887; Owosso, Michigan
- Died: January 22, 1971 (aged 83); Fort Lauderdale, Florida
- Occupation: Businesswoman
- Known for: First woman in the United States issued a chauffeur's license

Cora V. Taylor (March 1887 - January 22, 1971) was an American businesswoman from Michigan known for founding what is now the Indian Trails bus service with her husband Wayne Taylor. She was the first woman in the United States to be issued a chauffeur's license.

== Early life ==
Cora V. Phillips was born in March 1884 in Owosso, Michigan to Richard and Mary Phillips. She worked as a clerk at the D M Christian store in Owosso before her marriage to Wayne E. Taylor on 30 October 1907 and the two owned a 600 acre stock farm in Owosso.

== Bus company ==
The Taylors started the Phillips-Taylor Livery Service in 1910 which originally moved people and packages via Model T touring cars and autobuses from the local train station to locations around Shiawassee County.

Wayne Taylor served in the Army Signal Corps in World War I and Cora ran the bus line. She drove on some of the early routes, leading her to become the first woman issued a chauffeur's license in the US on April 19, 1914. The Taylors bought their first bus in 1915.

As the bus line expanded and added Flint to their routes, the Owosso-Flint Bus Line became known as the Indian Trail Route because it traveled along US-12, known locally as the "Old Indian Trail". Taylor was interested in Michigan history, researched the Michigan Native populations, and named each bus line after an Ottawa, Potawatomie or Chippewa tribal chief. The bus line eventually became known as Indian Trails in 1935. Taylor succeeded her husband as president of the company when he died in 1954. The company was still owned by Taylor family members as of 2023.

== Commemoration ==
Taylor was inducted into the Michigan Department of Transportation's Hall of Honor in 2006 and the Cora Taylor Safe Driving Award was created by Indian Trails in 2009.
