= Western Washtenaw Area Value Express =

Bus system in Washtenaw County, Michigan

Western-Washtenaw Area Value Express
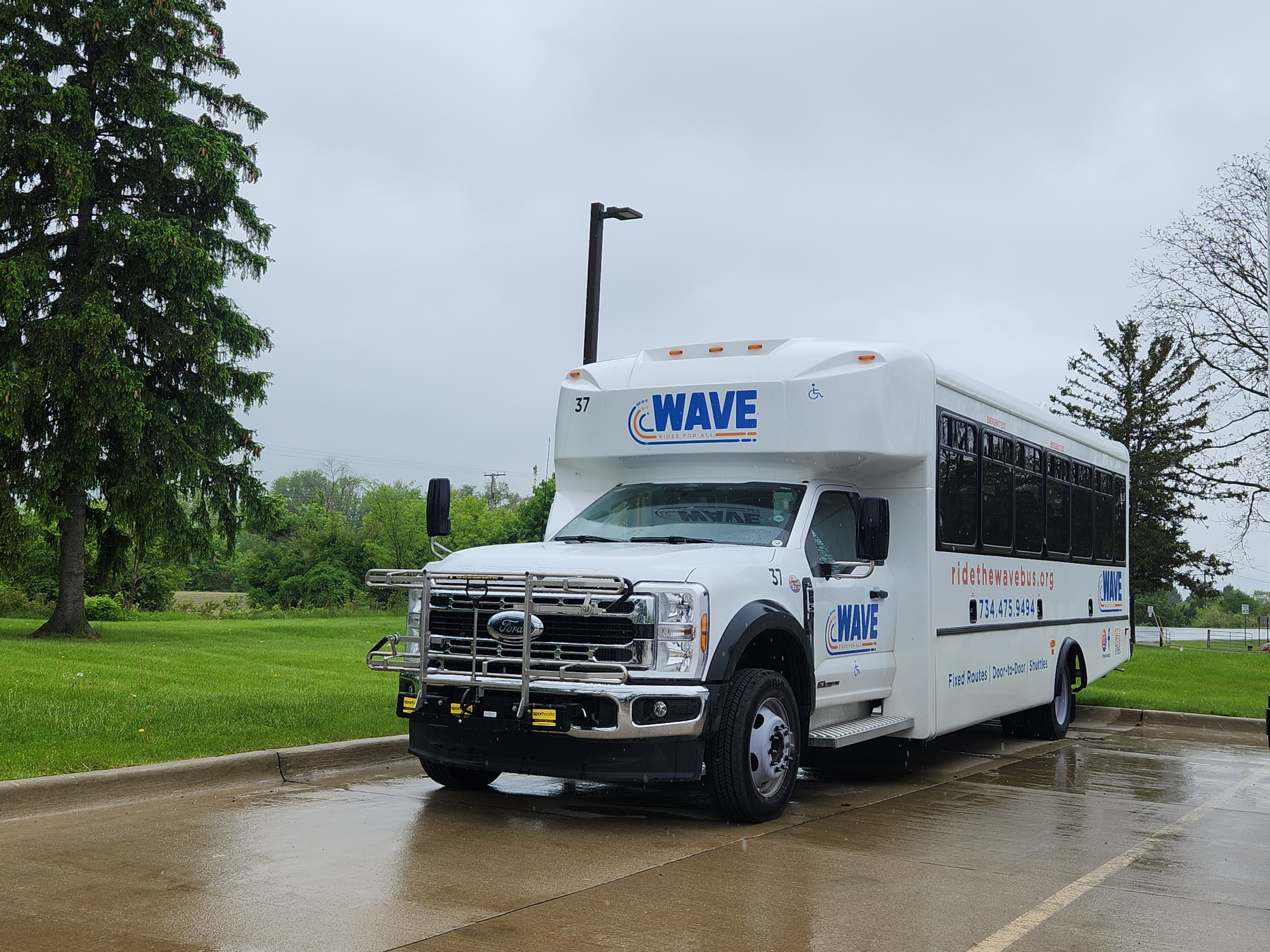
- WAVE bus at the company's headquarters in Lima Township
- Founded: 1976; 50 years ago
- Service area: Washtenaw and parts of Ingham, Jackson, and Livingston counties
- Fleet: 13 buses, 2 vans
- Annual ridership: 27,000
- Board President: Kim Moore
- Website: ridethewavebus.org

The Western-Washtenaw Area Value Express, also known as The WAVE, is a non-profit bus system serving western Washtenaw County, Michigan.

== Services ==
WAVE provides door-to-door (demand-response) bus services in its namesake western Washtenaw County. The service area also includes the adjacent municipalities of Grass Lake in Jackson County, Pinckney in Livingston County, and Stockbridge in Ingham County. WAVE operates local shuttle bus services in the city of Chelsea and in Scio Township, and regional route from Chelsea to Scio Township that connects with AAATA Route 30.

== History ==
WAVE was established in 1976 as the Chelsea Area Transportation System (CATS), a nonprofit organization providing demand-response bus service to seniors and individuals with disabilities. CATS began service with one bus, serving a 54-square-mile (140 km^{2}) area centered on the town of Chelsea. By the early 1980s, the organization had an annual operating budget of $17,500 (equivalent to $51,000 in 2024), and served over 8,000 riders per year.

The Ann Arbor Transportation Authority began an Ann Arbor–Dexter–Chelsea bus service in 1987. AATA route 210 was funded by Scio Township and the villages of Chelsea and Dexter. Ridership on the route was low, and Scio Township withdrew from its agreement to fund part of the service in 1996. The funding arrangements gained media attention in October 1996, when a legally blind Scio Township resident paid AATA $1,566 (equivalent to $2,883 in 2024) out of her own pocket to keep the service operating. The sum was later reimbursed by a local business association. The unusual funding arrangements for the service were not sustainable, and AATA cut the Dexter–Chelsea segment in 2002, before discontinuing the entire route in 2003.

CATS expanded its services after AATA route 210 was cut back to Dexter, seeking to serve some of the demand for the AATA service. CATS applied for federal funding to supplement its existing local funding in 2002, and purchased multiple buses to support its expanded services. By 2004, CATS was operating 6 round-trips daily between Chelsea and the Ann Arbor city limits, connecting to an existing AATA bus service. CATS changed its name to Western Washtenaw Area Value Express in 2005, reflecting its new regional role.

WAVE expanded its demand-response service area in 2005, covering the entire Dexter Community Schools district. In 2008, Scio Township contracted with a local human services agency to operate another bus service along part of WAVE's route for one year, causing conflict between the township and the two bus operators. WAVE took over the service after the one-year trial period.

WAVE halted its services in March 2020 when the COVID-19 pandemic became a crisis in Michigan, resuming after three months. In August 2020, WAVE introduced a route from Stockbridge to Manchester via Chelsea, sponsored by the St. Joseph Mercy Chelsea Hospital. The goal of the Stockbridge–Manchester service was to combat isolation in the two relatively small towns and provide access to healthcare and human services. With the assistance of federal COVID-19 relief funding, WAVE introduced new computerized dispatch systems and coordinated rides to COVID-19 vaccination sites. The Stockbridge–Manchester route was replaced by demand-response service in the Stockbridge and Manchester areas in late 2021. In 2023, WAVE announced that it was considering purchasing electric buses.
