= Ann Arbor Area Transportation Authority =

Public transit operator in Washtenaw County, Michigan, USA

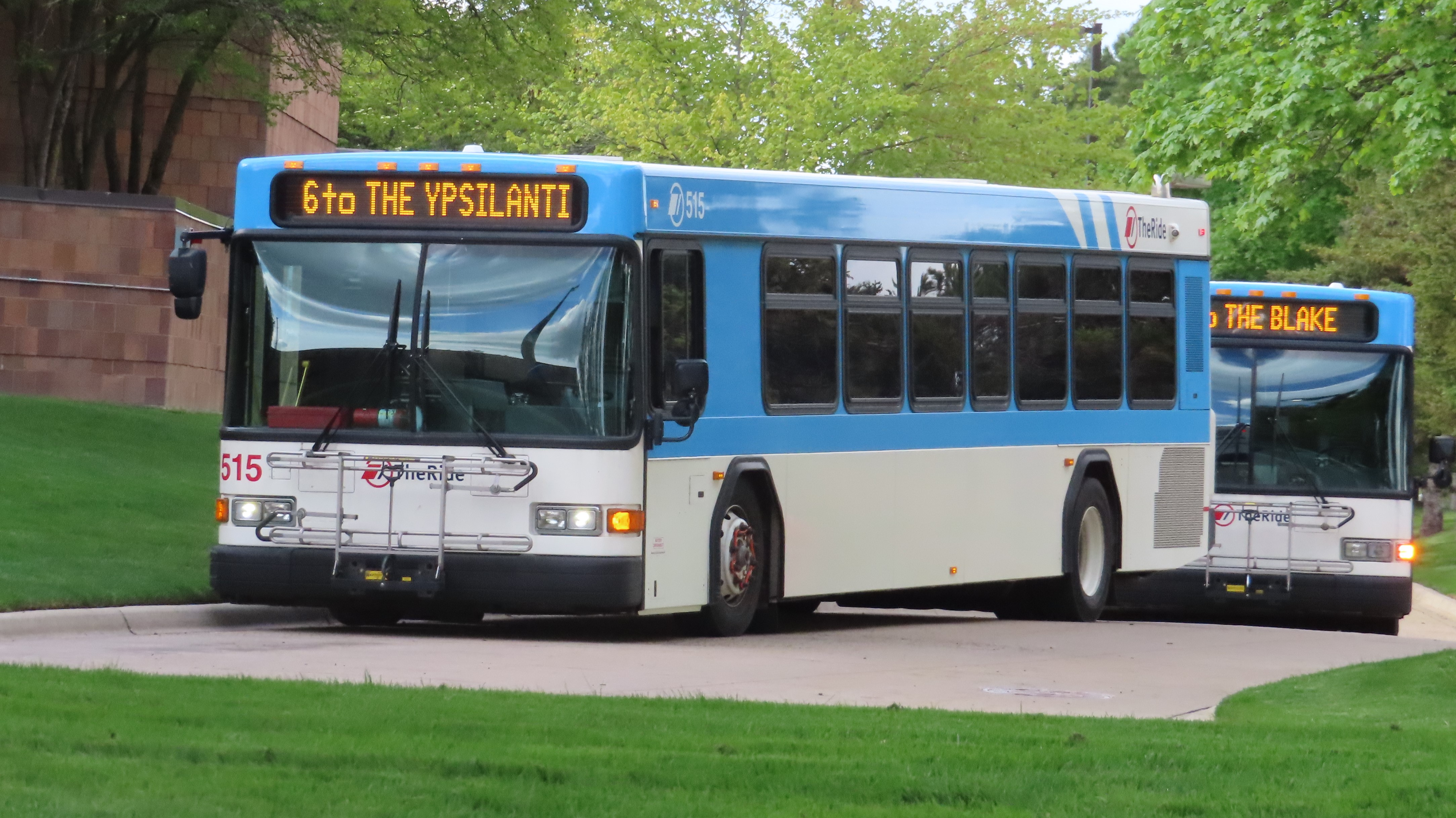
- Commenced operation: 1969
- Headquarters: Ann Arbor, Michigan
- Service area: Washtenaw County, Michigan
- Service type: Bus service; Paratransit
- Routes: 30
- Hubs: Blake Transit Center; Ypsilanti Transit Center
- Fleet: Gillig BRT Nova Bus LFS
- Daily ridership: 17,600 (weekdays, 2024)
- Annual ridership: 5.2 million (2024)
- Fuel type: B12
- Chief executive: Matt Carpenter
- Website: theride.org

The Ann Arbor Area Transportation Authority (AAATA), branded as TheRide, is the public transit system serving the Ann Arbor and Ypsilanti area in the U.S. state of Michigan. In fiscal year 2024 (October 2023 – October 2024), the system had a ridership of 5,170,030.

== History ==
=== Predecessors ===
Bus service in Ann Arbor began in 1925, when streetcars of the Ann Arbor and Ypsilanti Street Railway were replaced by buses. Multiple privately owned bus companies in Ann Arbor faced financial difficulties beginning in the late 1940s. Great Lakes Greyhound ended its Ann Arbor services in 1957, and its successors faced financial ruin. St. John Transportation Company of Dayton, Ohio began service in 1968, with a guaranteed subsidy from the city. Even with its subsidy, St. John's costs proved higher than expected, and it ceased operations in January 1969.

In 1969, the city of Ann Arbor directed the Ann Arbor Transportation Authority to purchase and run its own buses. This included $200,000 for their first fiscal year.

=== First AATA-run buses ===
The city-wide buses began operation on 1 April 1969. In January 1970, the AATA was granted a $429,275 federal grant for the purchase of buses. By July, the system was predicted to carry 600,000 passengers in the next year, which chairperson George Bacalis called "exceptional." By October, the AATA was requesting to provide input on all work on major roads in the city due to the impact road works had on bus service.

=== Expansion ===
In late 1973, Washtenaw Community College provided funds to run a bus service from Arborland Center to their campus in Ann Arbor Charter Township. The township government refused to provide its own funds towards the bus service. That same year, the AATA offered their first paratransit line with a wheelchair-accessible van service within city limits.

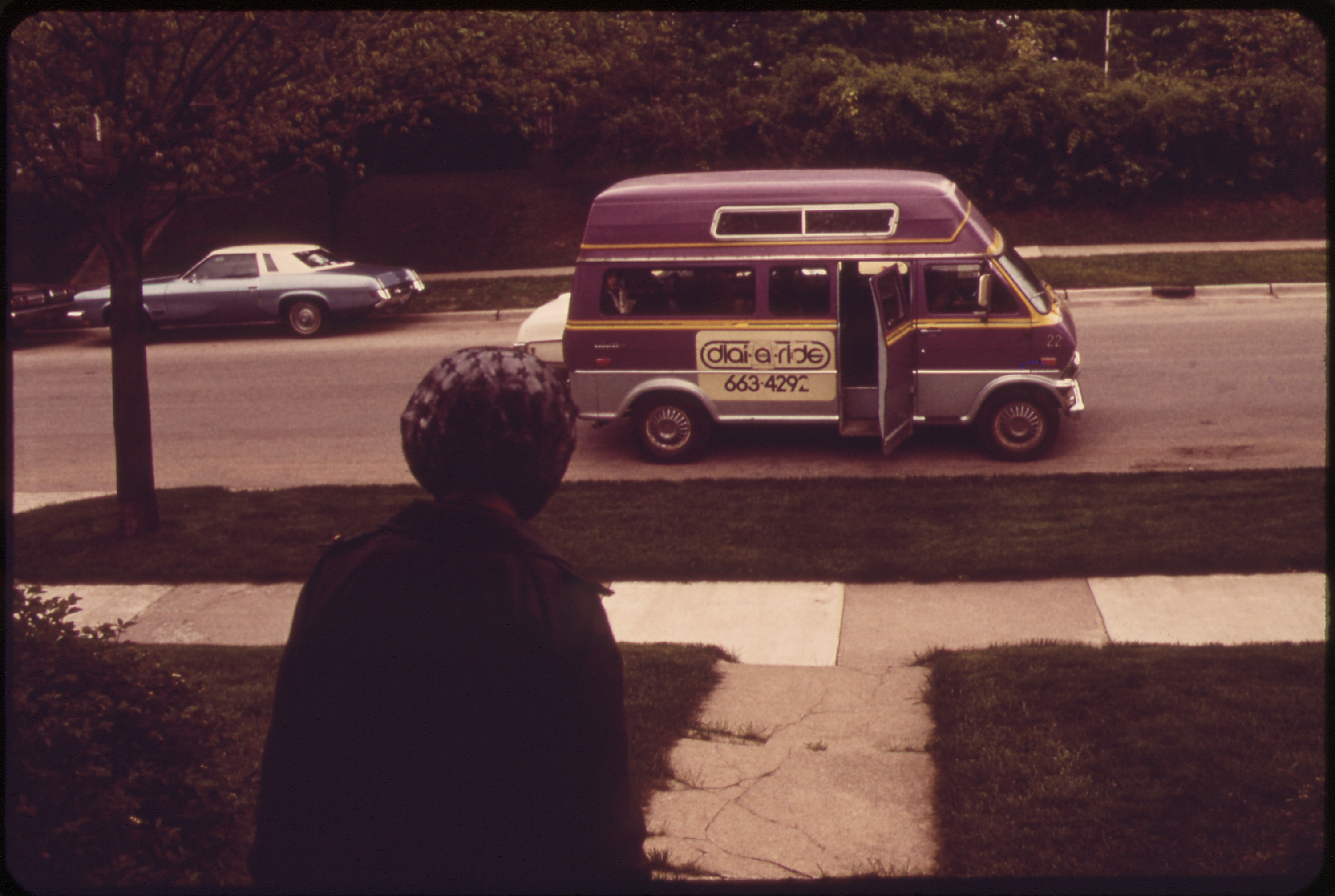
Dial-A-Ride bus in 1973

On 18 February 1974, the first AATA bus between Ann Arbor and Ypsilanti ran, going from downtown Ann Arbor along Washtenaw Avenue to downtown Ypsilanti and into Ypsilanti Charter Township. On-demand bus service branded as Teltran started later that year within the city limits of Ann Arbor. By mid 1974, the AATA's bus system had over a million annual riders.

In the late 1980s and early 1990s, the AATA under director Michael Bolton worked with the city and the University of Michigan to create a 20-year transportation plan. The American Public Transit Association gave the AATA its annual bus safety award in June 1991. Bolton left the AATA for Capital Metro in 1994.

The AATA was the first transit authority in the United States to operate low-floor buses when, in early 1993, they took delivery of ten New Flyer D40LF buses. In terms of operation, only two Canadian authorities and the Port Authority of New York and New Jersey operated such buses prior to the AATA.

In November 2012, the AATA broke ground on the new Blake Transit Center, at a cost of $8.1 million. The new 2-story, 12,019-square-foot downtown transit hub replaced a one-story structure built at the site at 328 South Fifth Avenue in the 1980s. The new Blake Transit Center was officially opened for use on July 7, 2014. The D2A2 bus provides service from the Blake Transit Center to downtown Detroit.

=== Rebranding and expansion ===
In August 2013, the agency's board voted to change its name from the Ann Arbor Transportation Authority (AATA) to the Ann Arbor Area Transportation Authority (AAATA). The name change reflects the addition of neighboring Ypsilanti to the agency board and the growing focus on regional services within Washtenaw County's urban core. In December 2013, the Ann Arbor City Council approved adding Ypsilanti Township as a charter member of the AAATA. Despite reduced bus ridership in other areas of Michigan, AAATA continued expanding its ridership throughout the 2010s through expanded bus service.

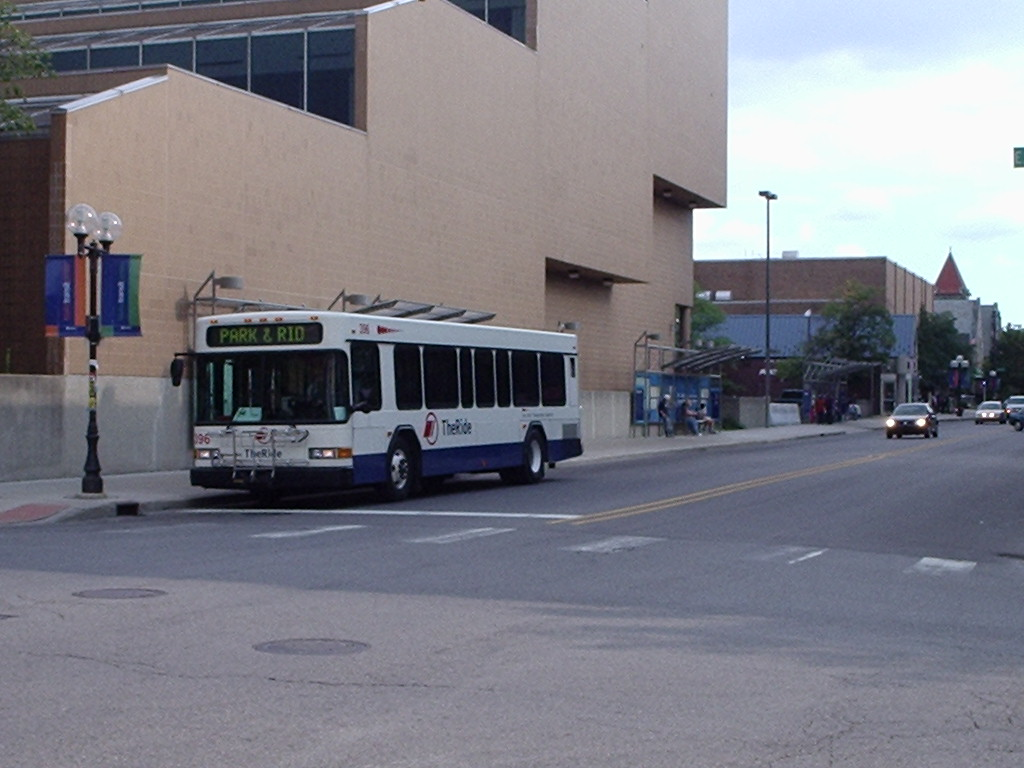
TheRide bus in front of the federal building in 2005. The original Blake Transit Center is visible in the background.

== Services ==
=== Fixed routes ===
Routes that travel east–west between Ann Arbor and Ypsilanti are numbered in the single digits. Routes that begin at the Blake Transit Center and serve Ann Arbor neighborhoods are numbered 22–34. Local services in Ypsilanti, originating from the Ypsilanti Transit Center, are numbered 42–47, and crosstown routes that do not serve either transit center are numbered 62–68.

==== Current routes ====
Effective August 25, 2024.

#	Name	Termini		Frequency (min)			Notes
#	Name	Termini		Mon-Fri	Sat	Sun	Notes
3	Huron River	Blake TC	Ypsilanti TC	30	30	30	
4	Washtenaw Local	Blake TC	Ypsilanti TC	15-30	30	30	
5A	Packard	Blake TC	Ypsilanti TC	30	30	-	
5B	Packard	Blake TC	Meijer, Ypsilanti	30	-	30	
6A	Ellsworth	Blake TC	Ypsilanti TC	30	30	30	
6B	Ellsworth	Blake TC	Briarwood Mall	30	-	-	Through service to route 67
22	Pontiac-Dhu Varren	Blake TC	UM North Campus (Pierpont Commons)	30	60	60	
23	Plymouth	Blake TC	Plymouth Road Park & Ride	15 (daytime)	-	-	
23	Plymouth	Blake TC	Green Road Park & Ride	30 (evenings)	30	30	
25	Ann Arbor-Saline	Blake TC	Meijer, Ann Arbor-Saline Rd	30	30	30	
26	Scio Church	Clockwise loop through Blake TC, Scio Ridge		30	60	60	29 follows route counter-clockwise
27	W. Stadium-Oak Valley	Blake TC	Meijer, Ann Arbor-Saline Rd	30	30	30	
28	Pauline	Blake TC	Maple + Pennsylvania	15-30	30	30	
29	Liberty	Counter-clockwise loop through Blake TC, Scio Ridge		30	60	-	26 follows route clockwise
30	Jackson	Blake TC	Meijer, Jackson Rd	30	30	30	
31	Dexter	Blake TC	Jackson + Wagner	30	30	30	
32	Miller-Maple	Blake TC	Maple + Pennsylvania	30	30	30	Select trips serve Skyline High School
33	Newport	Blake TC	Warrington + Newport	30	-	-	Select trips serve Rudolf Steiner School of Ann Arbor
34	Maple-Dexter	Blake TC	Miller Road Park & Ride	30	-	-	11 trips daily; weekday peak only
42	Forest-MacArthur	Ypsilanti TC	MacArthur + Harris	30	30	30	
43	E. Michigan	Ypsilanti TC	Holmes + Ridge	30	30	30	Through service with route 68
44	Ecorse-Tyler	Ypsilanti TC	West Willow Community Center	30	30	30	
45	Grove	Ypsilanti TC	Grove + Harry	30	30	30	
46	Huron-Paint Creek	Ypsilanti TC	Huron River Dr + Textile	30	30	30	Select trips serve Arbor Preparatory High School
47	Harriet-W. Michigan	Ypsilanti TC	Hewitt + Ellsworth	30	30	30	
61	U-M Miller	Central Campus TC	Miller Road Park & Ride	30	-	-	Through service with route 65
62	U-M State	Central Campus TC	Wolverine Tower	12-15	-	-	Reduced service outside UM Fall and Winter semesters
63	U-M Pontiac	Central Campus TC	Food Gatherers	30	-	-	8 trips daily, weekday peak only. Through service with route 64
64	Geddes-E. Stadium	Central Campus TC	Pioneer High School	30	-	-	11 trips daily, weekday peak only. Through service with route 63
65	U-M Plymouth-Greenhills	Central Campus TC	Greenhills School	30	-	-	Through service with route 61
66	Carpenter-Huron	Meijer, Ypsilanti	Green Road Park & Ride	30	60	-	Select trips deviate to Golfside Rd or Greenhills School to serve Huron High School students
67	Eisenhower-Golfside	Briarwood Mall	Trinity Health Ann Arbor Hospital / Washtenaw Community College	30 (daytime)	-	-	Daytime 67 trips provide through service to route 6B
67	Eisenhower-Golfside	Briarwood Mall	Washtenaw Community College	60 (evenings)	30	30	
68	Harris-Ford	Gault Village	Holmes + Ridge	30	-	-	Through service with route 43
104	Washtenaw Express	Blake TC	Ypsilanti TC	30	-	-	Limited-stop service

==== Major transfer stops ====
The main hubs of the AAATA system are the Blake Transit Center in downtown Ann Arbor and the Ypsilanti Transit Center in downtown Ypsilanti. Both transit centers have an indoor waiting room with a staffed ticket window.

AAATA buses serve multiple locations on the campus of the University of Michigan. On the university's Central Campus, the main transfer point is the Central Campus Transit Center on Geddes Avenue. All services to the university's North Campus stop at Pierpont Commons, and all services to the University of Michigan Health campus stop on Observatory Street. Connecting service is available to University of Michigan Transit services at these locations, and other locations across the University of Michigan campus.

Additional transfer points in Ann Arbor include Arborland Center, Briarwood Mall, the Ann Arbor VA Hospital, and Traver Village Shopping Center. The Carpenter Road Meijer store, located in northeast Pittsfield Township, is a connection point for multiple bus lines in the Ypsilanti area.

=== Special services ===
TheRide provides paratransit services, branded as ARide, for individuals with disabilities. Since 2021, these services have been operated by MV Transportation. Microtransit services in Ypsilanti Township and Pittsfield Township, branded as FlexRide, are operated by Via Transportation. TheRide operates shuttle services for special events, including the Ann Arbor Art Fairs and Michigan Wolverines football home games. TheRide also coordinates carpools and vanpools in partnership with major area employers.

=== Connections ===
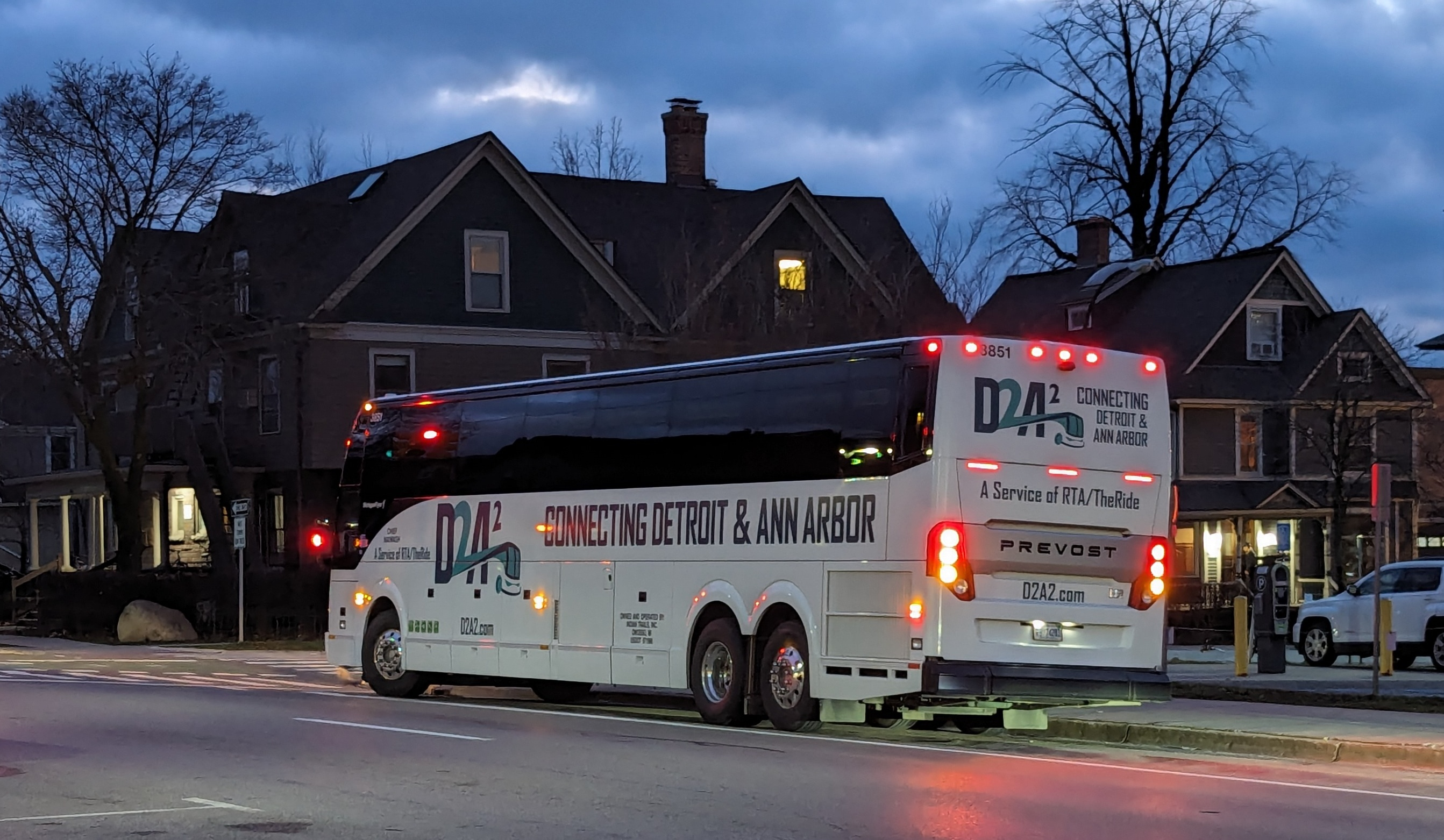
D2A2 Bus at the Blake Transit Center

AAATA service connects with University of Michigan Transit services at multiple points on the university's campus. These services are free to the public.

Connections to western Washtenaw County are available via the Western Washtenaw Area Value Express from the western terminus of route 30. Service to northeast Washtenaw County and Livingston County is provided by People's Express, connecting at the University of Michigan Hospital.

The Wolverine train service, operated by Amtrak, stops at the Ann Arbor station, which is served by lines 22, 33 and 65. The Amtrak station is also the Ann Arbor stop for multiple intercity bus services, including Greyhound and FlixBus.

The Michigan Flyer, which runs 12 daily trips from East Lansing via Brighton to Detroit Metropolitan Airport, stops at the Blake Transit Center.

D2A2 is an hourly express service between Ann Arbor and Downtown Detroit. In 2023 it added late-night summer buses from June to September, allowing Ann Arbor residents to leave Detroit near midnight.

==== Park and Ride ====
The AAATA provides ten free Park and Ride locations, mostly around the outskirts of Ann Arbor. All park-and-ride lots receive frequent bus service at weekday rush hours, and some locations feature all-day and weekend service. AAATA's "TheRide 2045" plan includes creating a second ring of park-and-ride lots for commuters further outside the city.

== Fleet ==
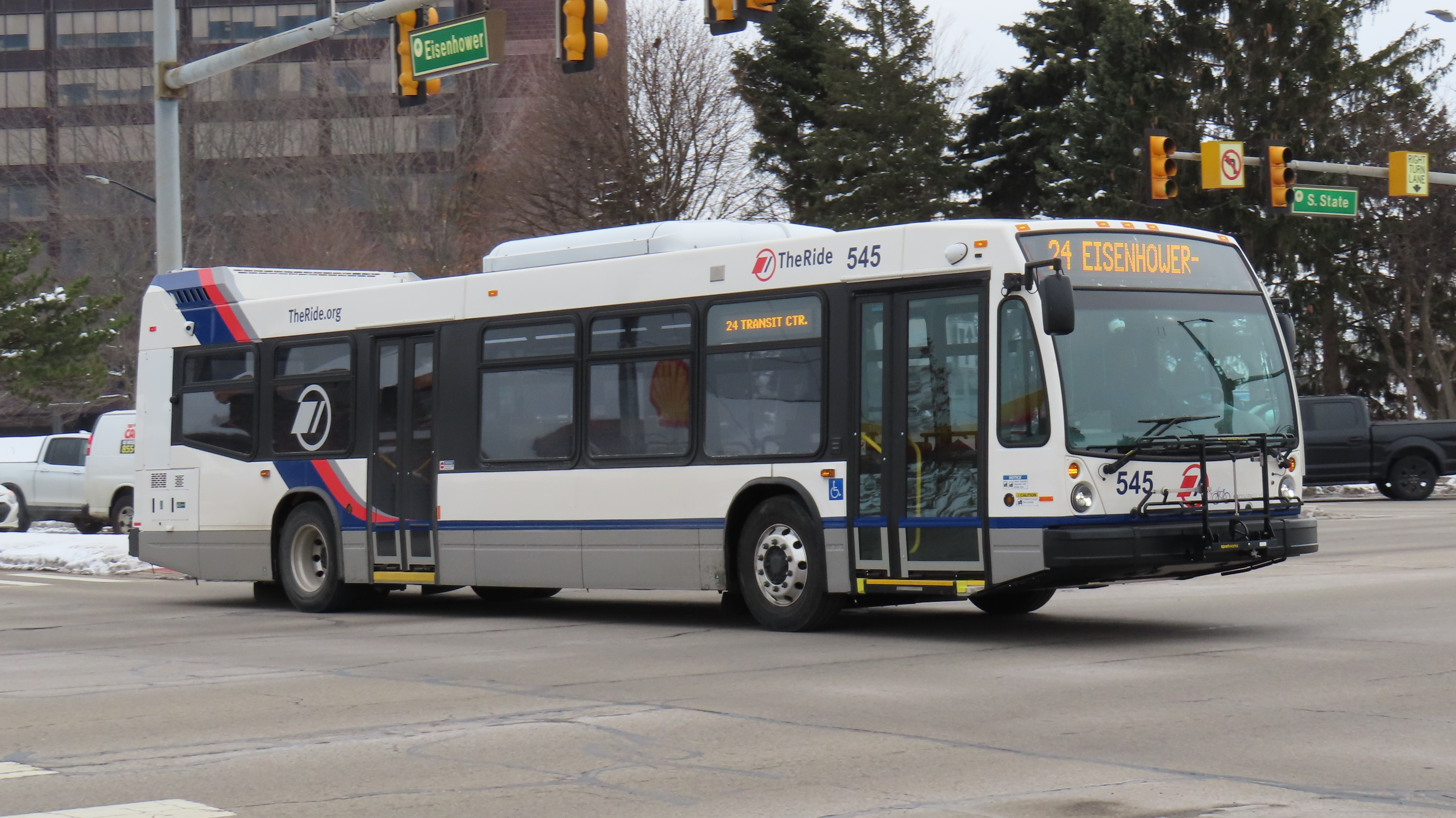
2022 Nova LFS

TheRide currently operates a mix of Gillig Low Floor and Nova Bus LFS buses on its fixed routes. The system's buses run on B12 biodiesel, and many are diesel-electric hybrid units. The AAATA has 55 hybrid electric buses in its fleet and, in 2007, became the first public transit operator in the Midwest to state its intention to convert to all hybrid electric buses, though these plans never came to fruition.

In 2022, the AAATA began exploring a series of plans to replace its entire diesel-powered fleet with battery-electric or hydrogen fuel cell-powered buses by 2035.

== Fares ==
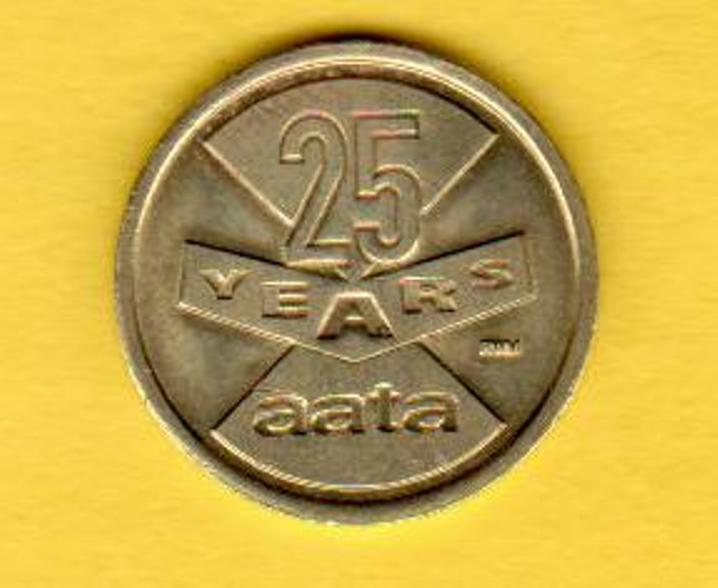
AAATA 25th anniversary token

AAATA uses a fixed-fare system. Full fare on fixed-route buses is $1.50, payable by cash or tokens. Day passes are available for $3.00, and 31-day passes are $45.00. Mobile ticketing is available for IPhone and Android smartphone users through the EZfare app. Transfers are free, and are valid for unlimited connections to fixed-route buses for 90 minutes.

Free fares are available for University of Michigan students, faculty, and staff; children under 6; registered seniors 65 years of age and over; customers with disabilities who are eligible for paratransit; and TheRide employees.

Reduced fares are available for customers including Medicaid recipients, K–12 school students, and seniors ages 60–64. All reduced fares are half the standard fare.

== Projects ==
Throughout its existence, the AAATA has worked on projects with other government agencies within Washtenaw county in order to improve transit service.

=== TheRide 2045 ===
The AAATA's current long-term project plan, called TheRide 2045, sets a high level vision for how the AAATA plans to expand service. Goals include reducing travel times, addressing equity gaps, and improving environmental outcomes. The plan was created with assistance of a public advisory group and after an 18-month public engagement process. An early part of this plan is a new property tax for the AAATA service area starting in 2024 which, in addition to addressing a structural deficit, will increase hours, provide at least 30 minute headways on weekends, and add an express route between the Blake Transit Center and the Ypsilanti Transit Center. Information specialists began staffing the YTC on 1 August 2023 for the first time since the center opened.

=== Transit Signal Priority ===
In 1973, the city of Ann Arbor and the AATA agreed to a system that would provide a computerized traffic light system to provide buses with priority. As of 2018, Transit Signal Priority options were still being studied.

=== Zero-emission buses ===
TheRide recommended to the AAATA board in October 2023 to pilot hydrogen fuel cell buses, with the AAATA contributing $1.1-1.5 million and federal grants paying an additional $4.4-6 million.

== Administration ==
The Ann Arbor Area Transportation Authority is a special district under Michigan law, which has agreements with six municipalities in Washtenaw County to provide services. The City of Ann Arbor, the City of Ypsilanti, and Ypsilanti Charter Township are full members of the authority, and have the power to make appointments to the authority's 10-member board of directors. Pittsfield Charter Township, Scio Township, and Superior Charter Township receive services from the authority under purchase-of-service agreements, and do not appoint board members.

Funding for the AAATA is provided by a variety of sources. As of 2023, passenger fares represent 7% of the authority's operating revenue. Other sources of funding include local property taxes, federal and state operating assistance, and purchase-of-service agreements.

Bus drivers, maintenance staff, and customer service agents at the TheRide are union members, represented by Local 171 of the Transport Workers Union of America.

The AAATA is the designated authority for the proposed Ann Arbor-Howell commuter rail line.

== See also ==
- List of bus transit systems in the United States
- Ann Arbor station
- Western Washtenaw Area Value Express
