= Briarwood Mall =

Shopping mall in Michigan, United States

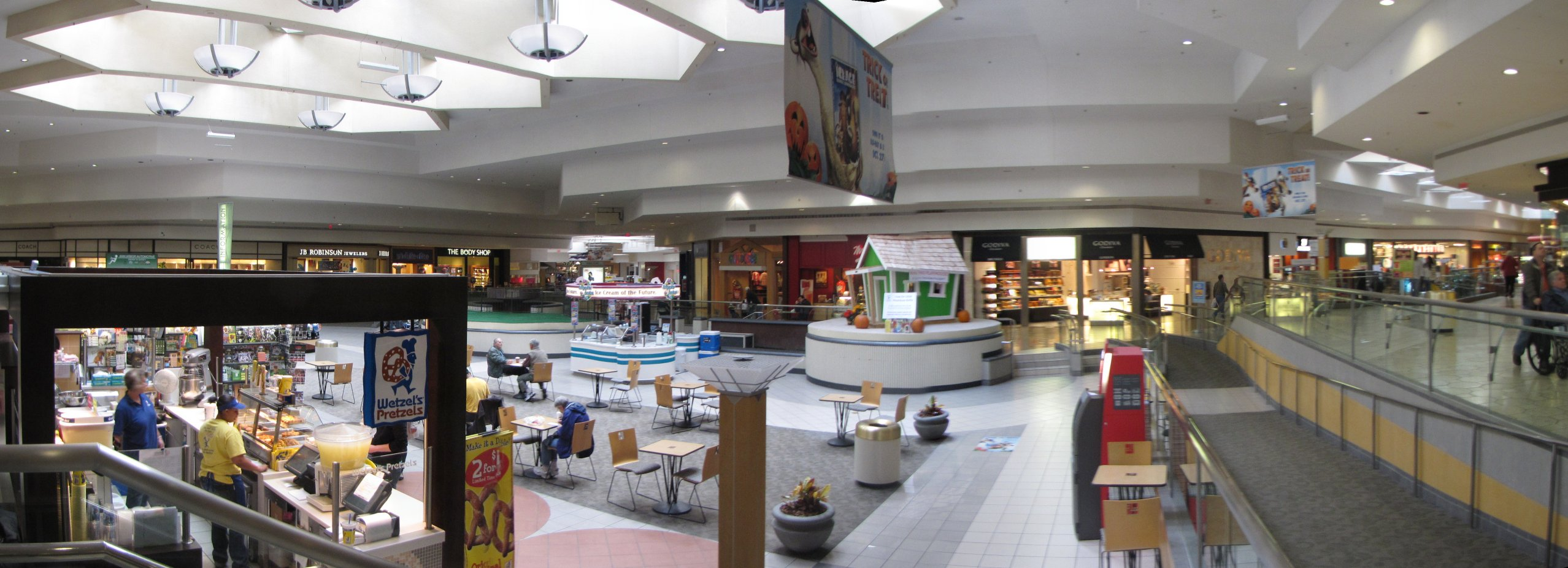
- Interior of Briarwood Mall, 2009
- Location: Ann Arbor, Michigan, United States
- Coordinates: 42°14′25.8″N 83°44′47.3″W
- Opened: October 3, 1973; 53 years ago
- Developer: Taubman Centers
- Manager: Simon Property Group
- Owner: Simon Property Group (50%); GM Pension Trust
- Num. of stores: 113
- Num. of anchor tenants: 4
- Floor area: 980,224 sq ft (91,000 m^{2})
- Floors: 1 (2 in Macy's, JCPenney, Von Maur, and Harvest Market)
- Public transit: AAATA 6, 24
- Website: simon.com/mall/briarwood-mall

Briarwood Mall is a shopping mall in Ann Arbor, Michigan, United States. The mall's four anchor stores are Macy's, JCPenney, Von Maur, and Harvest Market. Surrounded by offices, apartments, and other development, the mall anchors the southern Ann Arbor commercial area around Eisenhower Boulevard and I-94. It serves as the primary shopping mall for all of Washtenaw County. As of 2007 Simon Property Group manages and co-owns the mall (Simon owns 50%). Briarwood is considered a Class A mall property by developers based on its sales per square foot. Many restaurants, hotels and stores surround the mall.

== History ==
Originally developed by developer A. Alfred Taubman, Briarwood opened on October 3, 1973. At the time, it was anchored by JCPenney and Sears, with Hudson's opening a year later. Lord & Taylor was later added as the mall's fourth anchor in 1980. The store closed in 1993 and became Jacobson's, which relocated from its flagship store in downtown Ann Arbor.

Taubman's shopping center interests became a publicly traded real estate investment trust, Taubman Centers, in 1992. In 1998 Taubman Centers simplified its corporate structure and turned over full ownership to its financial partner, the GM Pension Trust. In 2001, Hudson's converted to Marshall Field's, which converted to Macy's five years later. Jacobson's would close in 2002 after the chain declared bankruptcy. Its location became the first Von Maur store in the state of Michigan in September 2003. The mall received a major renovation the following year. Taubman continued to manage the mall until 2004, when the Mills Corporation became 50 percent owner and manager.

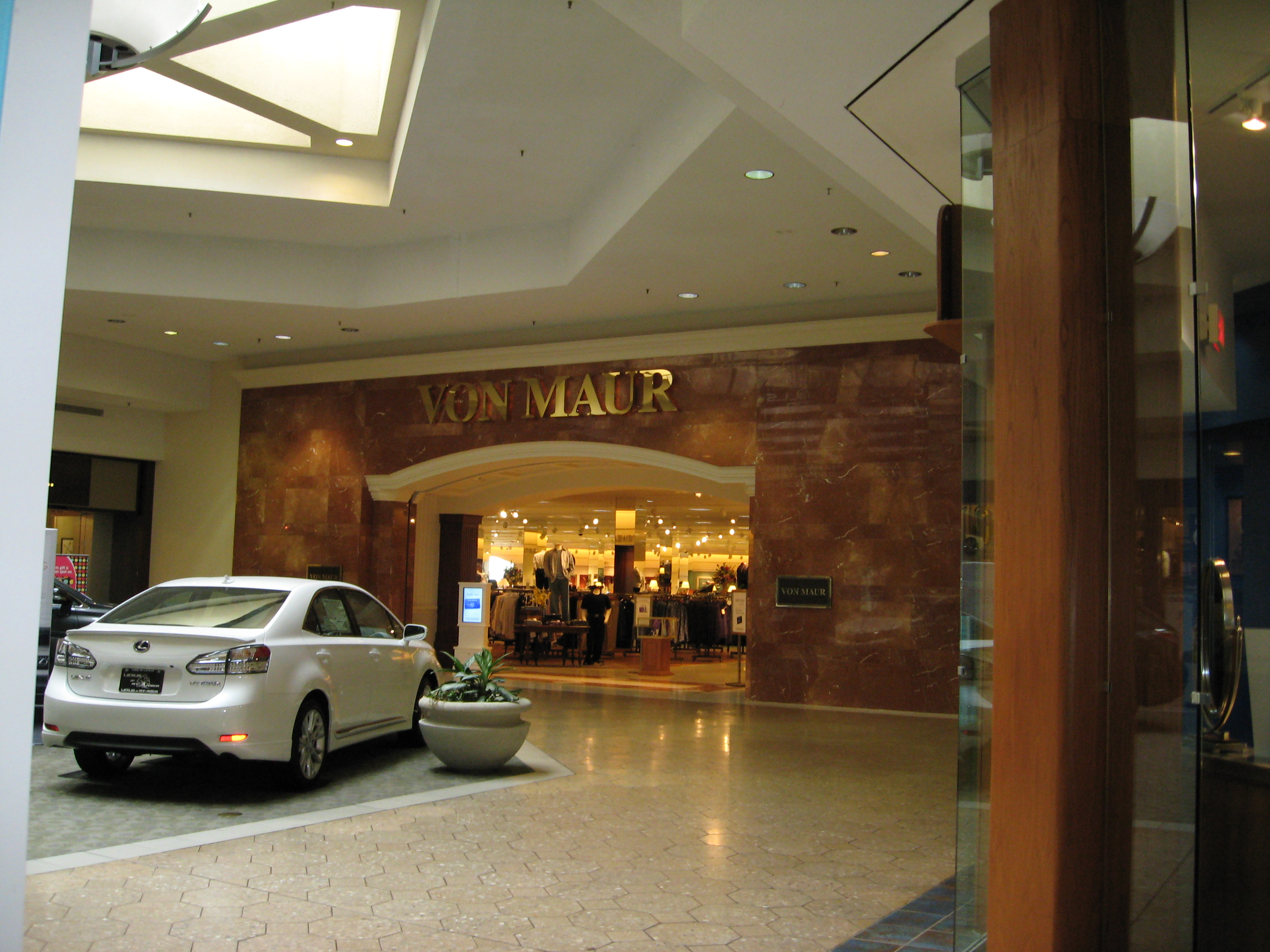
Briarwood Mall entrance to Von Maur, 2010

In 2007, Simon Property Group gained control of the Mills. It is Simon's first managed property in the state of Michigan.

Briarwood Mall was home to a movie theater at its grand opening, originally run as "United Artists Briarwood." After the closure of many of United Artists' theaters in the late 1990s, the theater was operated as "Madstone Theater of Ann Arbor", "Village 7 Theaters", and "Movies at Briarwood." The theater was later reduced to four screens, as the other three screens were taken over by a new Pottery Barn. The theaters closed again in 2010, with an MC Sports replacing them.

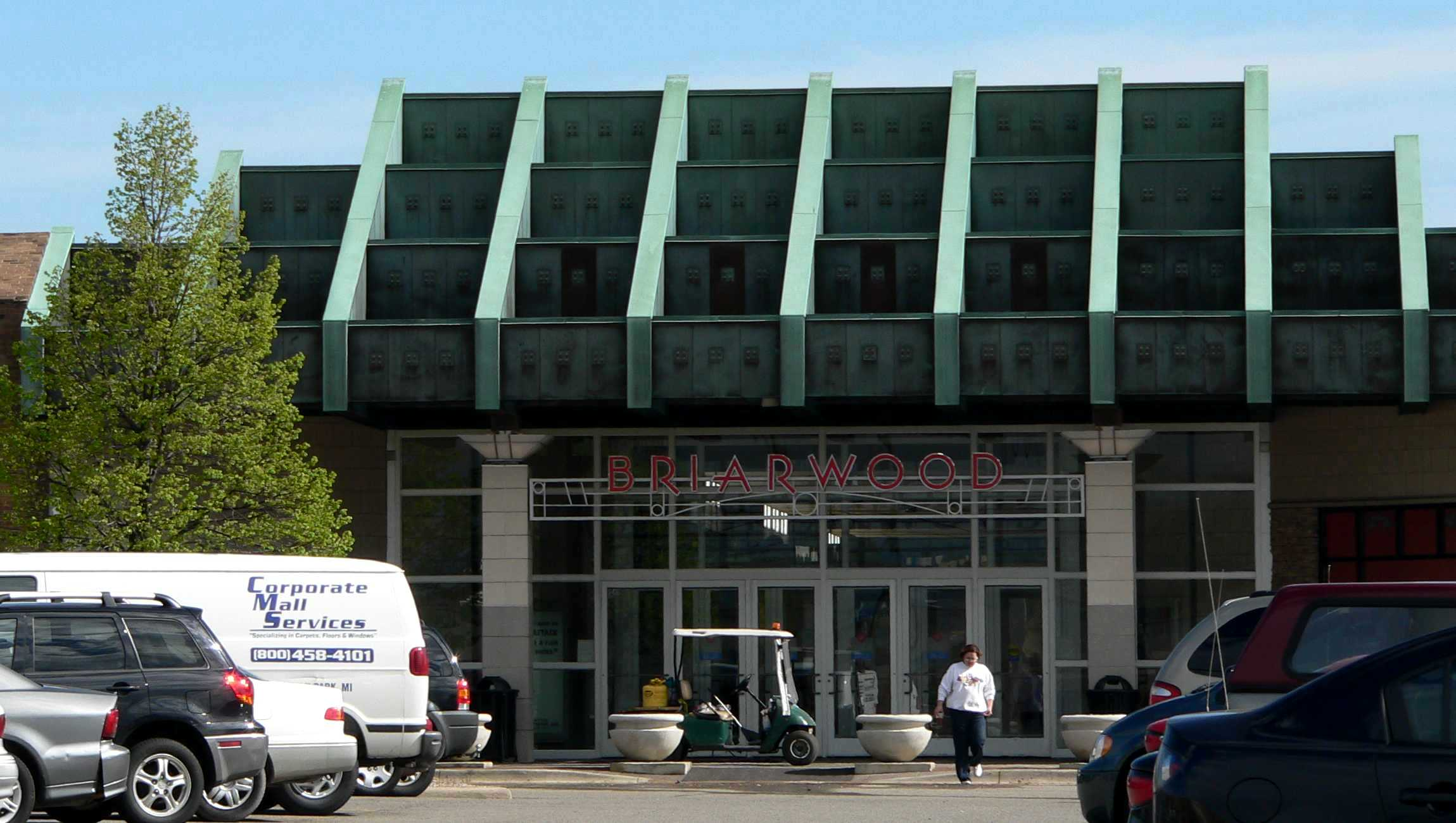
Entrance to Briarwood Mall, 2007

Briarwood received a major renovation in 2013 with new flooring, new lighting and redesigned mall entrances. Renovations also included LED lighting, and improved mall seating and bathrooms. In August 2014, Forever 21 opened a newer, larger store in the JCPenney wing, replacing space that was formerly occupied by Payless ShoeSource, Zales Jewelers, GameStop, Icing by Claire's, a salon, and a vacant Arby's. In 2015, Sears Holdings spun off 235 of its properties, including the Sears at Briarwood Mall, into Seritage Growth Properties. MC Sports closed in 2017 and the space was split up between Colby Bounce and Signature Nails & Spa. However, Colby Bounce closed in 2018, and the space is currently Extreme Fun. On October 15, 2018, Sears announced that its Briarwood location would close after filing for Chapter 11 bankruptcy. In July 2023, a Texas de Brazil, the chain's second location in Michigan, opened in the former Bravo! Cucina Italiana space.

In February 2023, Briarwood Mall announced the redevelopment plans of the former Sears space, intending to replace it with a two-level retail building, a gourmet grocery store, an approximately four-level, multi-family residential building, and an out lot building. These plans were revised in April 2024, splitting the initial planned retail building into two smaller buildings and adding a 325-stall parking structure and outdoor plaza adjacent to the residential building. The supermarket, named Harvest Market, opened on April 15, 2026. The luxury apartments being built adjacent to Harvest Market are projected to be completed in August 15, 2026. Dick’s Sporting Goods has also announced plans to open a store on a portion of the former Sears site.

== See also ==
- Tourism in metropolitan Detroit
