= Ann Arbor and Ypsilanti Street Railway =

Railway in Michigan

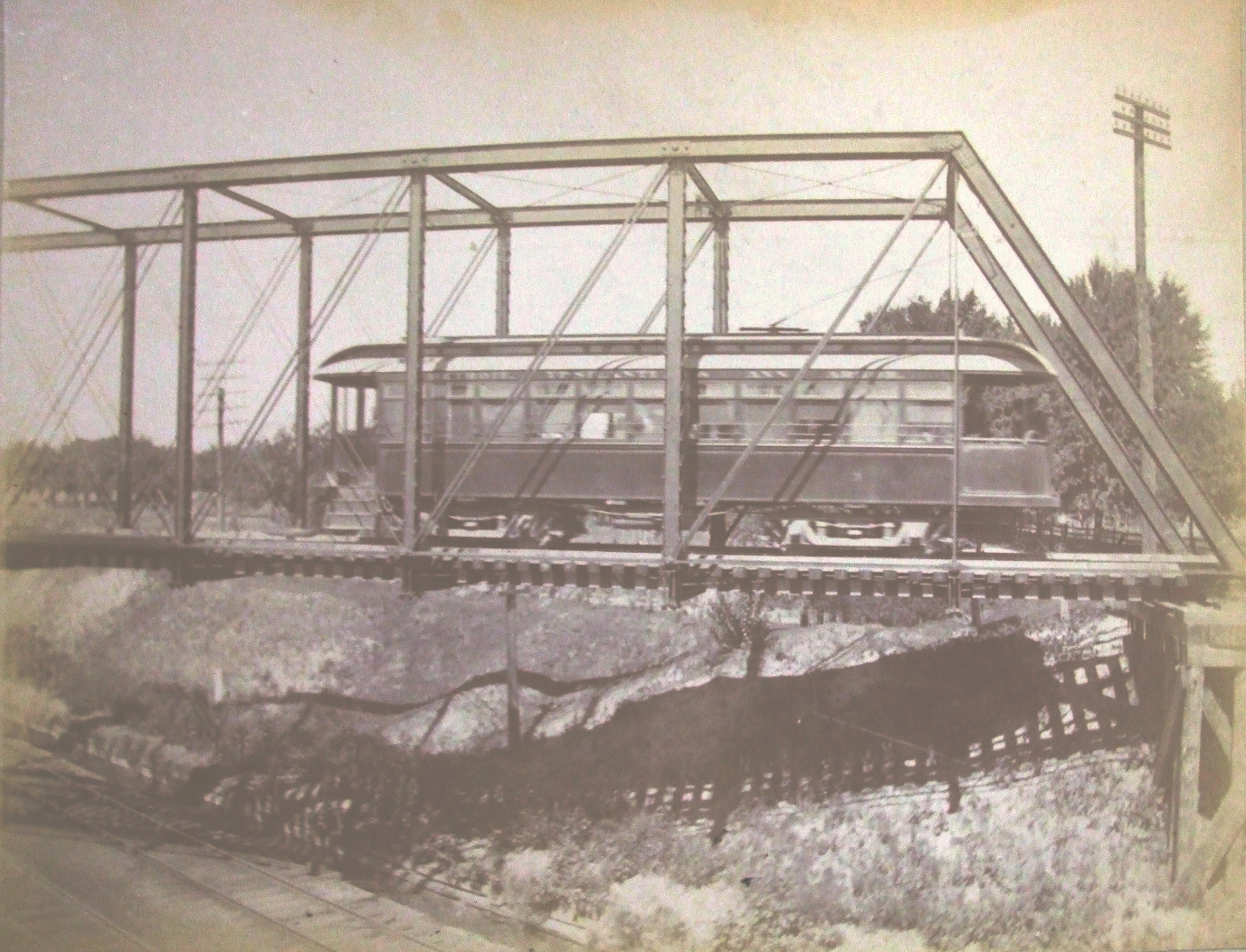
An interurban streetcar operated by the Detroit, Ypsilanti and Ann Arbor Railway, successor to the Ypsi-Ann, races over the Michigan Central Railroad east of Michigan Center.

The Ann Arbor and Ypsilanti Street Railway, known informally as the Ypsi-Ann, was an interurban railroad operating in southeastern Michigan; it was the first such operation in the state.

== History ==
In October 1889 the city of Ypsilanti, Michigan invited the Haines Company of Kinderhook, New York to construct street railway within the city. The following summer Charles Delemere Haines arrived in Ypsilanti and quickly determined that the city's population could not support its own streetcar system, but that an interurban between it and neighboring Ann Arbor, Michigan, would be viable. Haines proposed a 7.5 mile line running from Ypsilanti's downtown to the edge of Ann Arbor. Haines predicted that the system would handle 500 passengers daily; at that time trains operated by the Michigan Central Railroad between Ann Arbor and Ypsilanti carried forty.

The company was officially incorporated on August 30, 1890. From Ypsilanti the route ran west on Cross Street/Packard Road to the Ann Arbor city limits, near Wells Street. The company commenced construction on October 22; the line was completed on December 19. The company petitioned the Ann Arbor Common Council for permission to extend the line into the city, but was denied. The reason for denial was that the original motive power of the line came not from semi-quiet electricity, but from a rattling and hissing steam locomotive—which had been covered in boards to disguise it as a wood-sided wagon, so that it would be less alarming to horses. Ann Arbor residents opposed it banging through their streets. The AA&YRy therefore negotiated an arrangement with the Ann Arbor Street Railway for its electric cars to meet the dummy at the city limits and exchange passengers.

=== Service: 1891–1929 ===
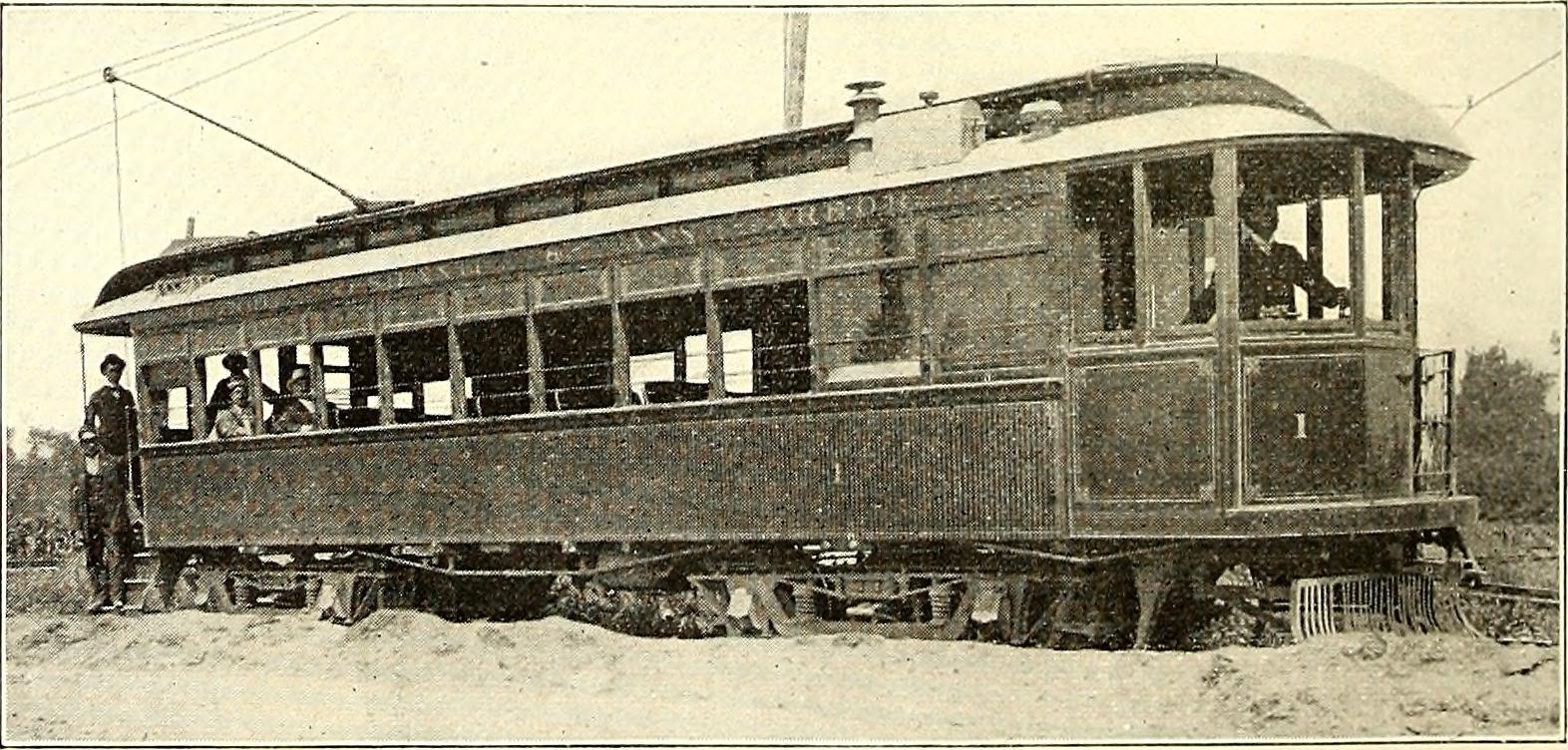
An Ann Arbor and Ypsilanti train in the 1890s

Regular service began on January 9, 1891, using steam traction. On the 26th the Ypsi-Ann's owners purchased the AASRy, but the two companies continued to operate separately. The line carried 600 passengers daily, well ahead of projections. The improved connection between the two cities had social effects: students attending the University of Michigan and Normal College mixed on an unprecedented scale. Years later, a former Normal student remembered that:

"...the University of Michigan boys would arrive from Ann Arbor on the Ypsi-Ann Interurban to court the Normal College coeds, who were considered more attractive than the U of M coeds. As they alighted from the interurban at the stop at Cross and Summit Streets, a group of Normal College boys would greet them. A battle royal would ensue with most of the participants eventually being dunked in the fountain just east of Welch Hall..."

Trains operated every ninety minutes, at an average speed of eight miles per hour. The starting fare was ten cents.

On August 26, 1896, the two companies formally merged to become the Ann Arbor and Ypsilanti Electric Railway (AA&YRy). By November the route between Ann Arbor and Ypsilanti was fully electrified, opening a direct route between the two cities with no need to change trains. The depot in Ypsi was on Washington Street, just north of today's Michigan Avenue (then called Congress Street). The depot in Ann Arbor eventually was located at West Huron and Ashley Streets. On May 11, 1898, the Detroit, Ypsilanti and Ann Arbor Railway (DY&AA) purchased the Ann Arbor and Ypsilanti; a month later interurbans were operating all the way from Detroit to Ann Arbor, a forty-mile route. (Note: Other sources suggest the purchase occurred in January.)

=== Shutdown ===
Under a variety of names, interurbans continued to operate on the Ypsi-Ann's tracks, eventually coming under control of the Detroit, Jackson and Chicago Railway. The system finally shut down in 1929, in the face of steep competition from buses and automobiles. Ann Arbor's local trolley line had switched from street cars to buses in January, 1925.

== Legacy ==
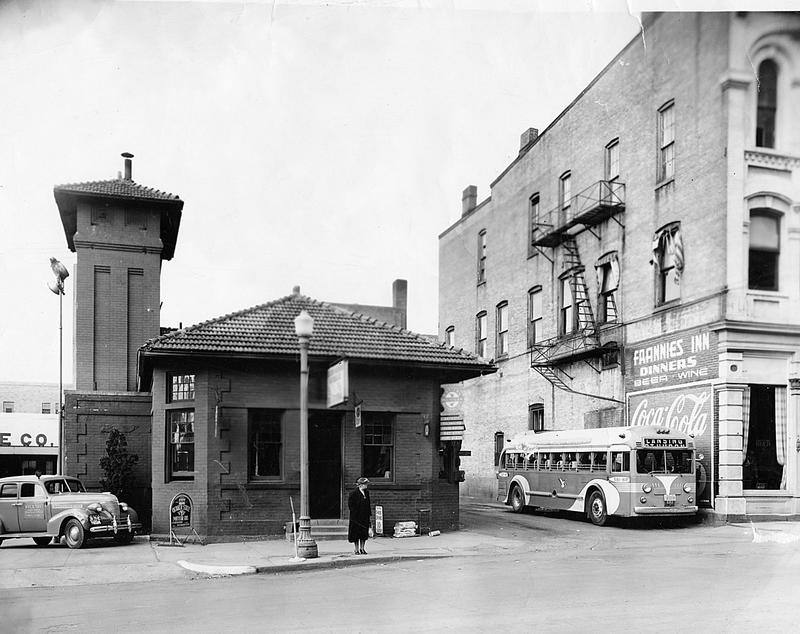
The former Ann Arbor and Ypsilanti Street Railway station at West Huron Street in Ann Arbor serving as the Greyhound bus depot, ca. 1939

The Ypsi-Ann's downtown Ann Arbor terminal building was replaced by the Ann Arbor Greyhound depot in 1940. It served in that function until a hotel was built on the site in 2015. An intermediate depot in the Mallets Creek Settlement in Pittsfield Township—a tiny building at the SW corner of Packard and Platt—later housed the municipal office of the short-lived City of East Ann Arbor from 1947 through 1956.

For years after the 1942 wartime scrap drives, it was believed that all of Ypsilanti's tracks had been removed, but in 2004 crews rebuilding a section of Washington Street found a stretch of rails buried under the pavement.

The Ann Arbor Area Transportation Authority, the present-day public transit operator in Ann Arbor and Ypsilanti, operates 4 bus routes from downtown Ann Arbor to downtown Ypsilanti. The interurban's route is approximately paralleled by Route 5, which was the third-busiest bus route in the system in 2023.
