= Indian Trails =

Intercity bus operator based in Michigan

Indian Trails Indian Trails, Inc.

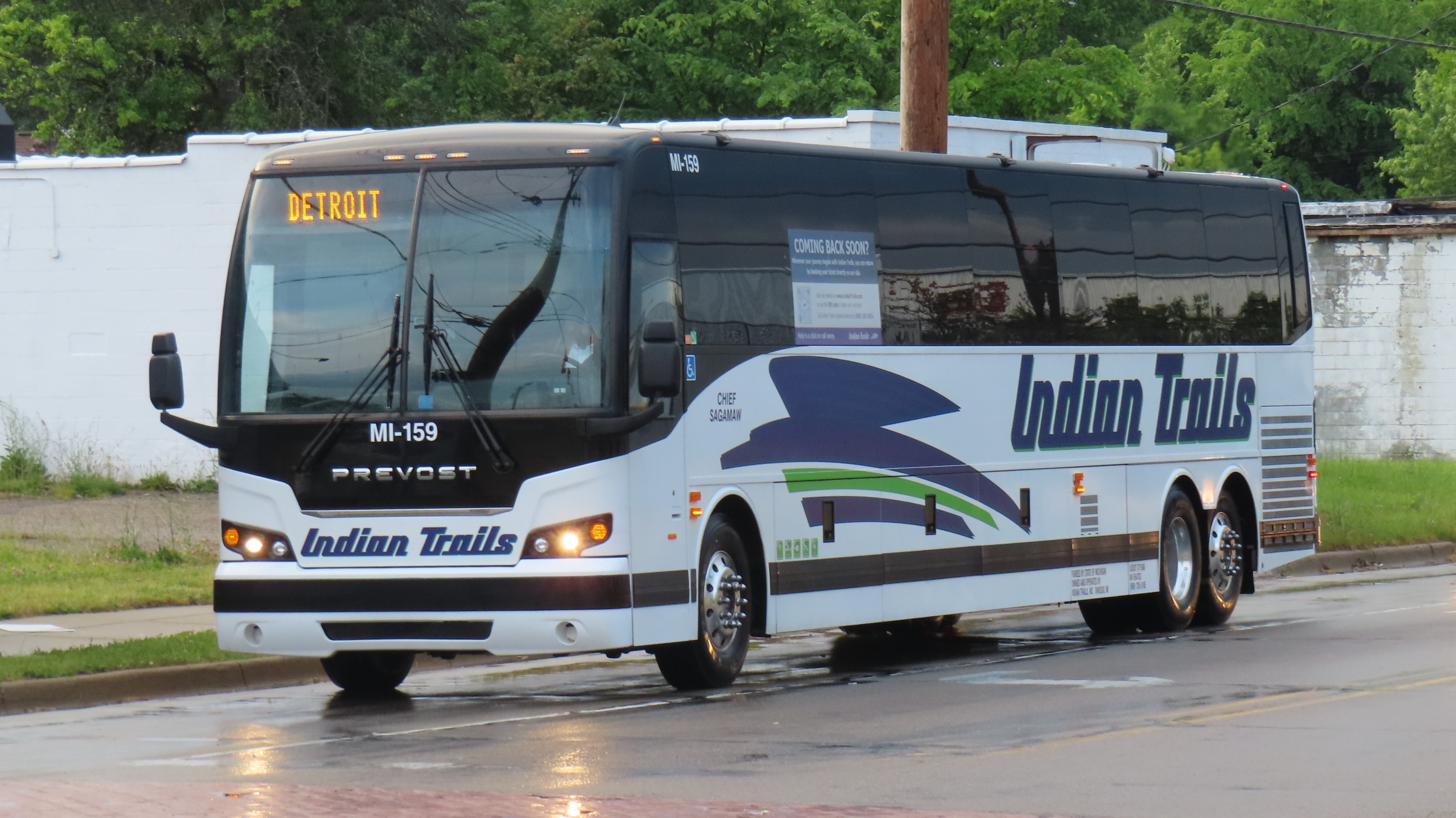
- Indian Trails bus in Pontiac, Michigan
- Founded: 1910
- Headquarters: Owosso, Michigan
- Locale: Michigan, Wisconsin, Minnesota
- Service type: Inter-city bus
- Annual ridership: 1 million+
- Website: indiantrails.com

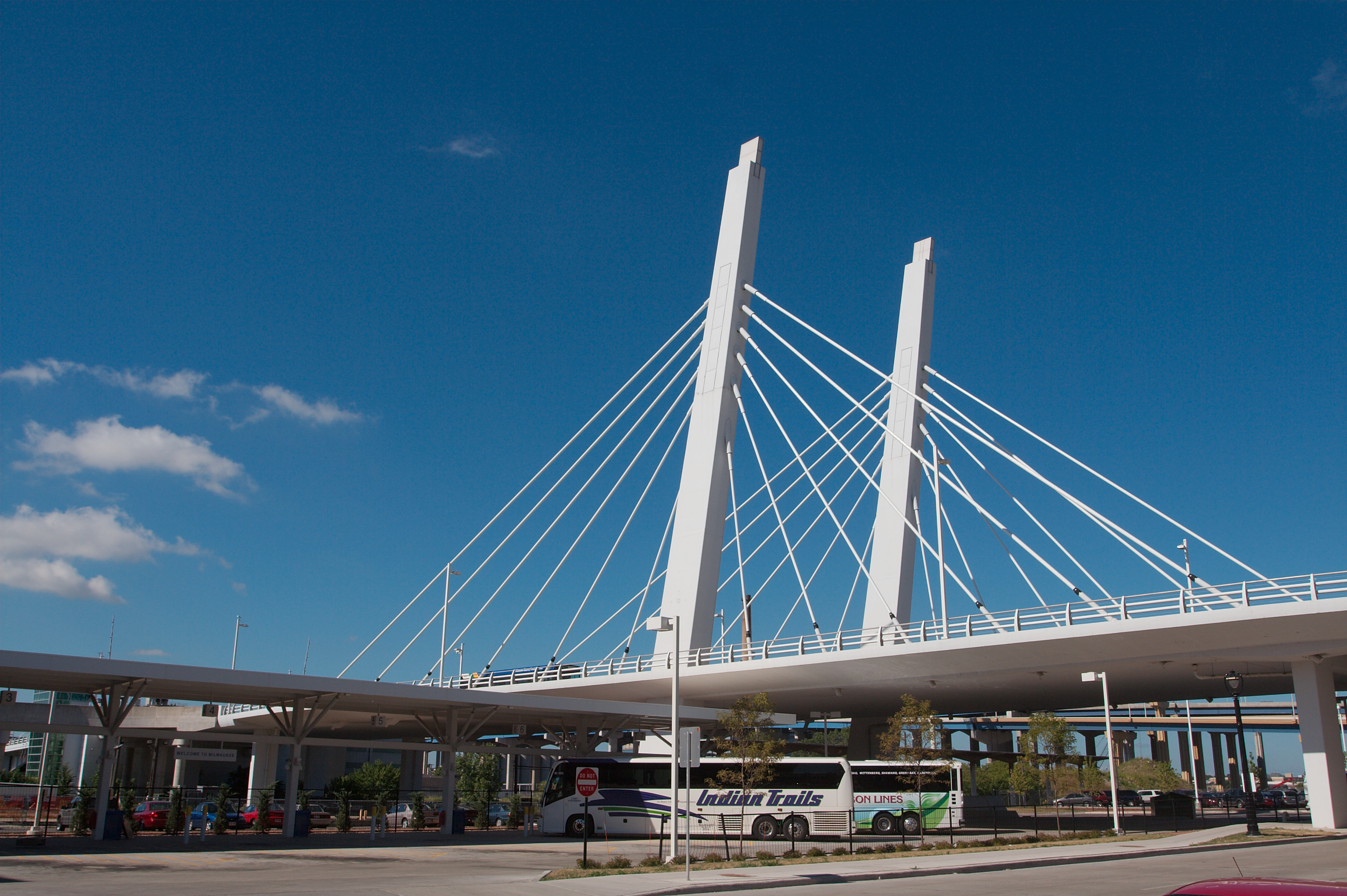
Indian Trails at Milwaukee Intermodal Station

Indian Trails is an intercity bus operator primarily serving the U.S. state of Michigan, with routes also serving Wisconsin and Minnesota. Indian Trails is based in Owosso, Michigan, with offices in Romulus, East Lansing, and Kalamazoo.

== History ==
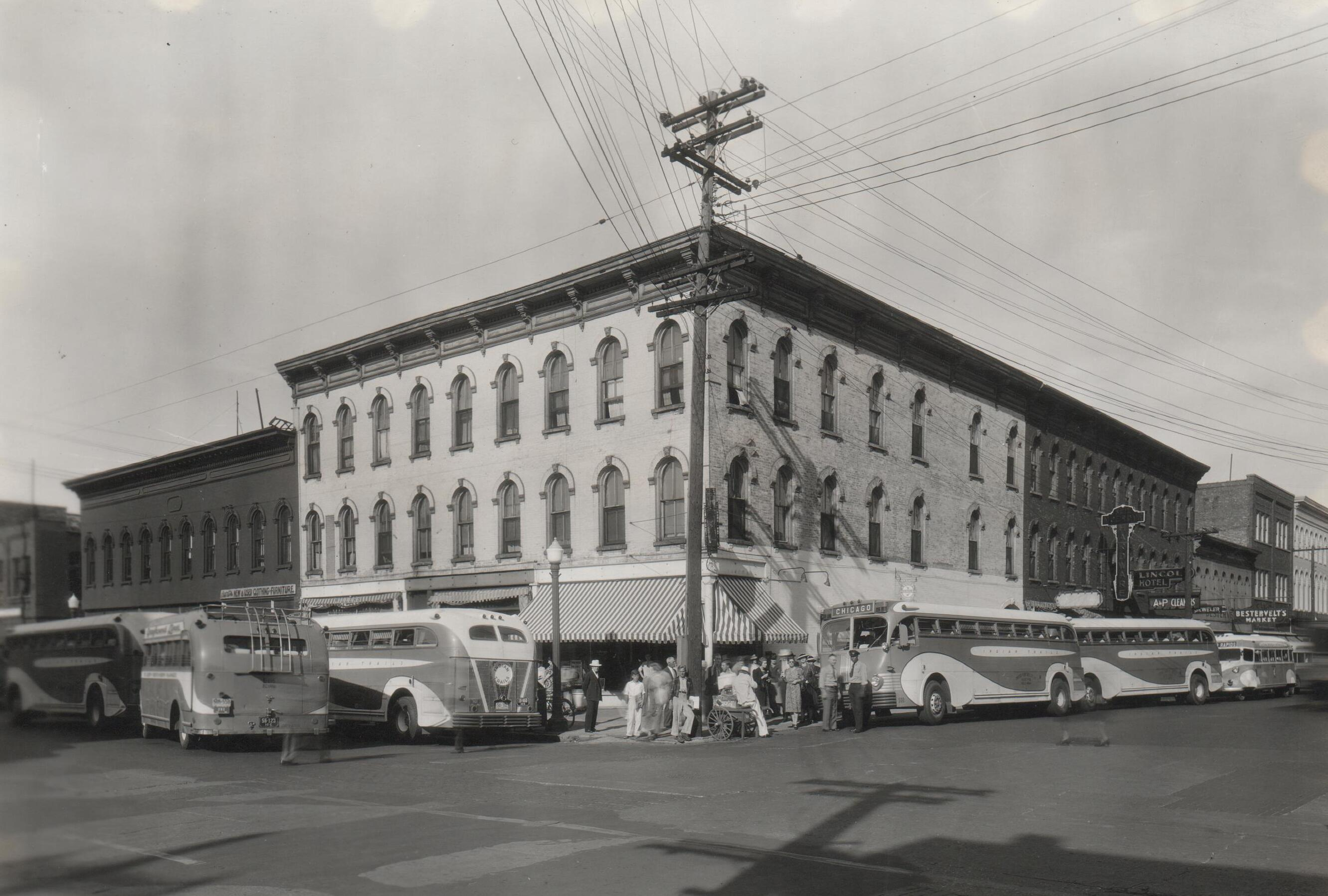
Indian Trails buses in Kalamazoo, Michigan, late 1930s

Indian Trails was founded in 1910 in Owosso by Wayne and Cora Taylor as the Phillips-Taylor Livery Service, whose main business was transporting cargo to and from Durand Union Station and the surrounding Shiawassee County. Cora Taylor was the first woman in the United States to be issued a chauffeur's license. Beginning in the 1910s, the company expanded to include intercity offerings, becoming known as the Owosso-Flint Bus Line and by the 1930s served much of southern Michigan. Many of its buses ran along US 12, known as "the Old Indian Trail." Reflecting this, in 1935, the company took its current name, Indian Trails.

Indian Trails offers charters, casino trips and regular fixed-route daily service. In 2006, Indian Trails assumed responsibility for a number of routes in Northern Michigan and the Upper Peninsula which Greyhound Lines had discontinued.

Indian Trails' daily scheduled bus service is part of Michigan's Intercity Bus System recognized by the Michigan Department of Transportation.

In November 2006, Indian Trails, in partnership with Okemos Travel, launched the Michigan Flyer, an express service connecting East Lansing, Jackson, and Ann Arbor with Detroit Metro Airport. In 2012, the Michigan Flyer absorbed the AirRide express service operated by TheRide, and service to Jackson was discontinued. In October 2019, a new stop was added at the Meijer store in Brighton.

On March 1, 2023, Indian Trails ended its longtime operating agreement with Greyhound Lines, and introduced a new ticketing system. The company also overhauled its route network, reintroducing direct service from Detroit to Chicago, among other changes. Chicago service was subsequently discontinued in November 2023.

== Current routes ==
=== Mainline ===
Effective November 1, 2023.

Indian Trails mainline routes
Route	Major stops
1483	Detroit, Southfield, Pontiac, Flint, Owosso, Lansing, Grand Rapids, Kalamazoo
1484	Kalamazoo, Grand Rapids, Cadillac, Traverse City, Charlevoix, Petoskey, St. Ignace
1485	Detroit, Southfield, Pontiac, Flint, Bay City, Alpena, St. Ignace
1488	Detroit, Southfield, Ann Arbor, Jackson, Lansing, Mt. Pleasant, Clare, Gaylord, Petoskey, St. Ignace
1489	St. Ignace, Sault Ste. Marie, Escanaba, Iron Mountain, Crystal Falls, Ironwood
1490	Hancock, Houghton, Marquette, Escanaba, Green Bay, Manitowoc, Milwaukee
1491	Ironwood, Hurley, Ashland, Iron River, Superior, Duluth

=== Michigan Flyer ===
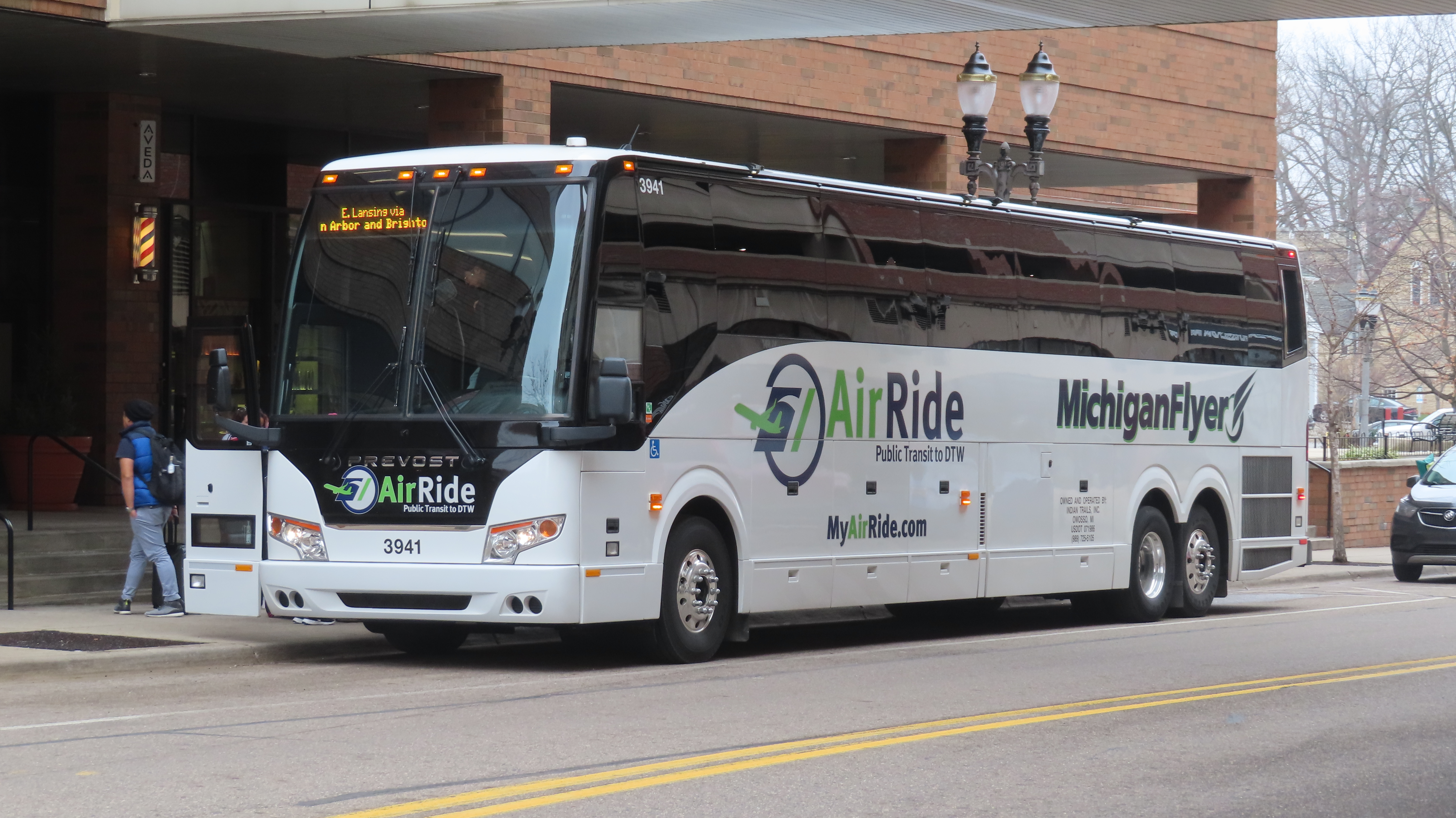
Michigan Flyer coach in East Lansing

Indian Trails operates the Michigan Flyer, an express service connecting East Lansing, Brighton, Whitmore Lake and Ann Arbor with Detroit Metro Airport. The service makes fourteen round trips daily.

==== Hytch ====
In May 2023, Indian Trails introduced Hytch, a shuttle service which provides door-to-door transportation from Lansing-area addresses to the Michigan Flyer stop in downtown East Lansing. Operated by Via Transportation, Hytch used minivans driven by independent contractors to provide rides. The service was available exclusively for ticketed Michigan Flyer passengers, who were able to add the service to their trip reservation for $10 extra per ride. Hytch service was suspended on February 10, 2024.

=== D2A2 and DAX ===
Indian Trails operates the D2A2 and Detroit Air Xpress (DAX) public transit routes under contract with the Regional Transit Authority of Southeast Michigan.

== See also ==
- Intercity bus service in the United States
- Detroit Bus Station
