= List of shopping malls in Michigan =

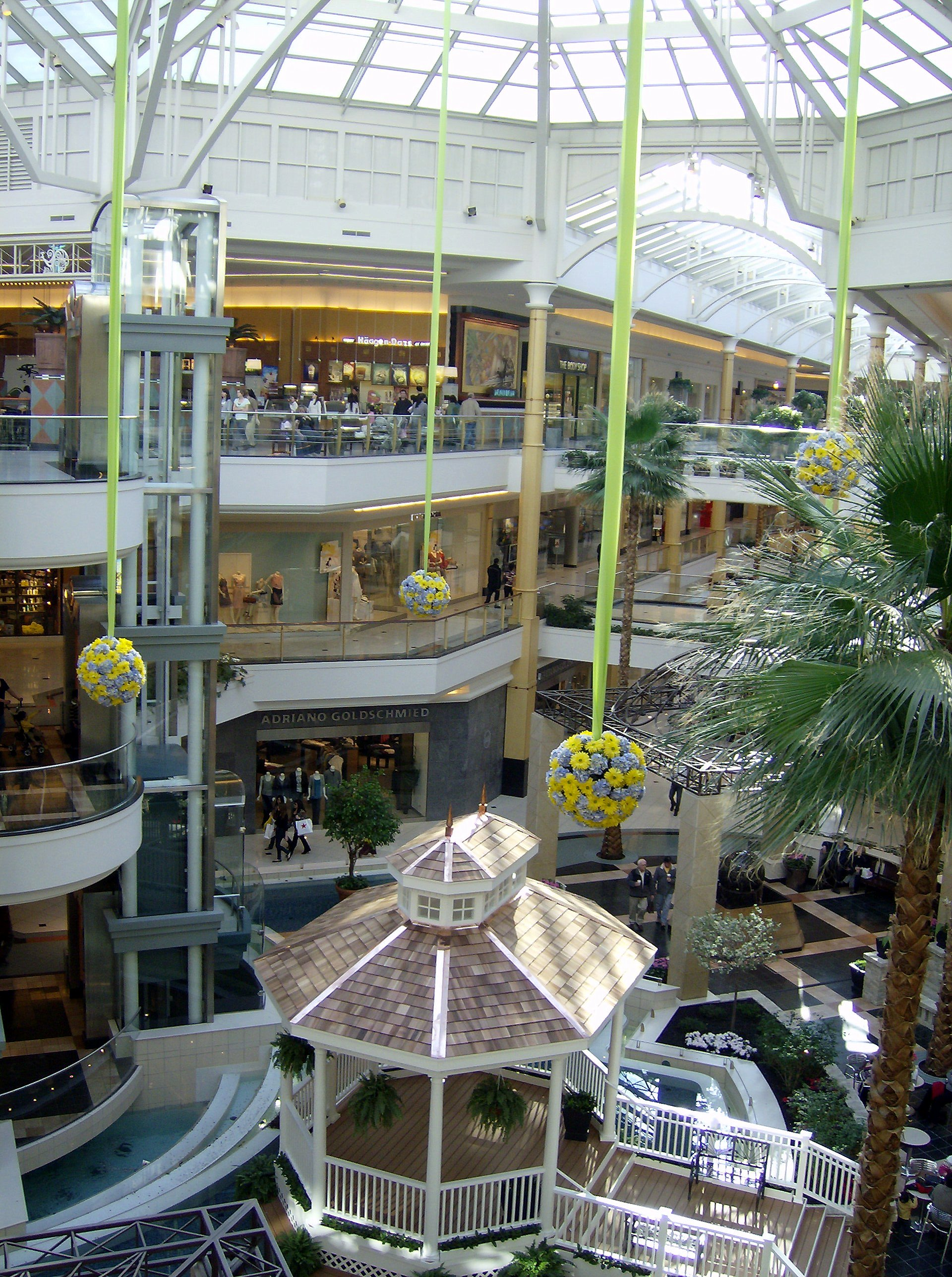
Somerset Collection in the Detroit suburb of Troy

The history of shopping malls in Michigan began in 1954. That year, the Hudson's department store chain and architect Victor Gruen developed Northland Center in the Detroit suburb of Southfield. It was followed by three other directional malls in Detroit suburbs, also developed by Hudson's and Gruen: Eastland Center in Harper Woods, Westland Center in Westland and Southland Center in Taylor. The first enclosed mall in Michigan was Rogers Plaza in Wyoming, which opened in August 1961. Beyond these, Michigan includes more than 50 other malls.

== Shopping malls by region ==
=== Northern Michigan ===
Name	Location	Gross leasable area sq ft / m²	Format	Stores	Type	Owner
Grand Traverse Mall	Traverse City	530,000 sq ft (49,200 m^{2})	Enclosed	50+	Regional	Brookfield Properties
Mackinaw Crossings	Mackinaw City		Outdoor		Community	Jim Wehr

=== Metro Detroit and Southeast Michigan ===
Name	Metro location	Gross leasable area sq ft / m²	Format	Stores	Type	Owner
Somerset Collection	Troy 42°33′41″N 83°11′2″W	1,450,000 sq ft (134,700 m^{2})	Enclosed	180 +	Super regional full-line upscale	The Forbes Company & Frankel Associates
Twelve Oaks Mall	Novi 42°29′31″N 83°28′13″W	1,500,000 sq ft (139,400 m^{2})	Enclosed	180 +	Super regional full-line upscale	Simon Property Group
Great Lakes Crossing Outlets	Auburn Hills	1,400,000 sq ft (130,100 m^{2})	Enclosed	180 +	Super regional outlet	Simon Property Group
Fairlane Town Center	Dearborn 42°18′59″N 83°13′23″W	1,225,000 sq ft (113,800 m^{2})	Enclosed	150	Super regional full-line	Kohan Retail Investment Group
Briarwood Mall	Ann Arbor 42°14′25.8″N 83°44′47.3″W	983,000 sq ft (91,300 m^{2})	Enclosed	120	Super regional full-line	Simon Property Group
Oakland Mall	Troy	1,500,000 sq ft (139,400 m^{2})	Enclosed	120	Super regional	Urban Retail Properties L.L.C.
Macomb Mall	Roseville	933,000 sq ft (87,000 m^{2})	Enclosed	100	Regional	Lormax Stern
Southland Center	Taylor	920,000 sq ft (85,000 m^{2})	Enclosed	100	Regional	Greenwood Global
Westland Center	Westland	1,056,696 sq ft (98,000 m^{2})	Enclosed	87	Regional	Namdar Realty Group
Mall at Partridge Creek	Clinton Township	640,000 sq ft (59,500 m^{2})	Open-air	90	Regional; Lifestyle center upscale	Starwood Capital Group
Laurel Park Place	Livonia 42°24′43.6″N 83°24′54″W	506,000 sq ft (47,000 m^{2})	Enclosed	74	Regional upscale	CBL
Village of Rochester Hills	Rochester	375,000 sq ft (34,800 m^{2})	Open-air	67	Lifestyle center upscale	Robert B. Aikens & Associates
Renaissance Center	Detroit 42°19′44.38″N 83°2′22.95″W		Enclosed	57	Regional; Tourist theme	General Motors
The Mall of Monroe	Monroe	620,411 sq ft (57,600 m^{2})	Enclosed	50	Regional	Cafaro Company
Green Oak Village Place	Brighton	550,000 sq ft (51,100 m^{2})	Open-air	46	Lifestyle center upscale	Redico, Quadrants Inc., Lormax Stern
Gateway Marketplace	Detroit	365,000 sq ft (33,900 m^{2})	Open-air	40	Power centre	
Universal Mall	Warren		Open-air	36	Power centre	Universal Mall Properties
Arborland Center	Ann Arbor 42°15′21.8″N 83°41′15.2″W	406,736 sq ft (37,800 m^{2}).	Open-air	26	power centre Big box cluster	AmCap Inc.
Livonia Marketplace	Livonia	325,000 sq ft (30,200 m^{2}).	Open-air		Community center convenience	Konover Properties
Twelve Mile Crossing at Fountain Walk	Novi	737,000 square feet (68,469.5 m^{2})	Open-air	20	Lifestyle center	Transwestern
Tel-Twelve Mall	Southfield	523,411 square feet (48,626.5 m^{2})	Open-air	20	power centre Big box cluster	Ramco-Gershenson Properties Trust
Novi Town Center	Novi		Open-air		power centre Big box cluster	Simon Property Group
Brighton Mall	Brighton	290,000 sq ft (26,900 m^{2}).	Open-air	18	power centre Big box cluster	Detroit Development
Southgate Shopping Center	Southgate		Open-air		Community center Plaza convenience	
Westborn Mall	Dearborn		Enclosed		Plaza convenience	

=== Central Michigan ===
Name	Location	Gross leasable area sq ft / m²	Format	Stores	Type	Owner
Meridian Mall	Okemos	997,128 sq ft (92,600 m^{2})	Enclosed	125	Super regional	CBL & Associates Properties
Lansing Mall	Lansing - Delta Township	830,052 sq ft (77,100 m^{2})	Enclosed	100	Regional	Kohan Retail Investment Group
Eastwood Towne Center	Lansing Township	332,131 sq ft (30,900 m^{2})	Open-air	66	Lifestyle center	Jeffrey R. Anderson Real Estate
Jackson Crossing	Jackson	652,770 sq ft (60,600 m^{2})	Enclosed	56	Regional	Namdar Realty Group
Westwood Mall	Jackson	510,000 sq ft (47,400 m^{2})	Enclosed	50	Regional	Kohan Retail Investment Group
Frandor Shopping Center	East Lansing	450,000 sq ft (41,800 m^{2})	Open-air	60	Community center	Lormax Stern

=== Flint - Tri-cities ===
Name	Location	Gross leasable area sq ft / m²	Format	Stores	Type	Owner
Bay City Town Center	Bay City	530,000 sq ft (49,200 m^{2})	Enclosed	50+	Regional	Lormax Stern
Birchwood Mall	Port Huron	790,000 sq ft (73,400 m^{2})	Enclosed	107	Regional	Kohan Retail Investment Group
Courtland Center	Burton	460,000 sq ft (42,700 m^{2})	Enclosed	30+	Regional	SMA Courtland LLC
Dort Mall	Flint	239,000 sq ft (22,200 m^{2})	Enclosed	10	Neighborhood	Perani family
Fashion Square Mall	Saginaw	798,016 sq ft (74,100 m^{2})	Enclosed	100+	Regional	Kohan Retail Investment Group
Genesee Valley Center	Flint	1,272,397 sq ft (118,200 m^{2})	Enclosed	127	Super-regional	Namdar Realty Group
Midland Mall	Midland	505,916 sq ft (47,000 m^{2})	Enclosed	50+	Regional	Jordan Dice

=== Western Michigan ===
Name	Location	Gross leasable area sq ft / m²	Format	Stores	Type	Owner
Breton Village	Grand Rapids		Outdoor	15+	Community center	
The Crossroads	Portage	769,801 sq ft (71,500 m^{2})	Enclosed	60+	Super-regional	Kohan Retail Investment Group
Lakeview Square Mall	Battle Creek	550,000 sq ft (51,100 m^{2})	Enclosed	9	Regional	GK Development
The Lakes Mall	Muskegon	645,677 sq ft (60,000 m^{2})	Enclosed	35+	Regional	Namdar Realty Group
The Orchards Mall	Benton Harbor	624,972 sq ft (58,100 m^{2})	Enclosed	0	Regional	JCJJ Management
Rivertown Crossings	Grandville	1,250,000 sq ft (116,100 m^{2})	Enclosed	80+	Super-regional	Poag Development Group
Rogers Plaza	Wyoming	365,572 sq ft (34,000 m^{2})	Enclosed	30+	Community	Sun Valley Ltd.
The Shops at Westshore	Holland	416,000 sq ft (38,600 m^{2})	Outdoor		Regional	Pacific Western
Woodland Mall	Kentwood	1,100,000 sq ft (102,200 m^{2})	Enclosed	175+	Super-regional	PREIT
The Shops at Centerpointe	Grand Rapids	575,000 sq ft (53,400 m^{2})	Outdoor and indoor		Regional	

=== Upper Peninsula ===
Name	Location	Gross leasable area sq ft / m²	Format	Stores	Type	Owner
Copper Country Mall	Houghton	257,863 sq ft (24,000 m^{2})	Enclosed	10+	Regional	CCM Capital Partners
Delta Plaza Mall	Escanaba	187,659 sq ft (17,400 m^{2})	Enclosed	27	Regional	Amicus
Midtown Mall	Iron Mountain		Enclosed	20	Community	Kraus Anderson
Westwood Mall	Marquette		Enclosed	30+	Regional	Kohan Retail Investment Group
Mineral River Plaza	White Pine		Enclosed		Community	

== Other outlet centers ==
- Birch Run Premium Outlets — Birch Run
- Holland Town Center — Holland
- Lansing Factory Outlet Stores — DeWitt
- Monroe Outlet Center — Monroe
- Port Huron Factory Shops — Port Huron
- Tanger Factory Outlets — Grand Rapids
- Kensington Valley Outlets (formerly Tanger Outlets) — Howell
- West Branch Outlet Center (formerly Tanger Outlets) — West Branch

== Defunct or redeveloped ==
Mall	Location	Year closed / de-malled
Adrian Mall	Adrian	2020 (closed)
Alpena Mall	Alpena	2022 (closed)
Birchwood Mall	Kingsford	—
Bloomfield Park	Pontiac	Never completed
Brighton Mall	Brighton	1996 (de-malled)
Centerpointe Mall	Grand Rapids	2012–2013 (de-malled)
Cherryland Mall	Traverse City	1999 (de-malled)
Eastgate Center	Roseville	—
Eastland Center	Harper Woods	2021 (closed)
Fort Saginaw Mall	Saginaw	1995 (closed)
Gull Crossing	Kalamazoo	—
Hampton Square Mall	Essexville	2010 (closed)
M & M Plaza	Menominee	c. 2021 (interior demolished)
Lakeside Mall	Sterling Heights	2024 (closed)
Maple Hill Mall	Kalamazoo	2004 (demolished and redeveloped)
Marquette Mall	Marquette	2017 (closed); 2019 (partially demolished)
Muskegon Mall	Muskegon	2001 (closed)
North Kent Mall	Grand Rapids	2001 (closed)
Northland Center	Southfield	2015 (closed)
Old World Village Mall	East Lansing	1976 (closed)
Southland Shopping Center	Portage	—
Summit Place Mall	Waterford Township	2009 (closed)
Traverse City Premium Outlets	Garfield Township	—
Universal Mall	Warren	2009 (de-malled)
West Main Mall	Kalamazoo	c. 1980 (closed)
Winchester Mall	Rochester Hills	c. 1993 (de-malled)
Water Street Pavilion	Flint	1990 (closed)
McCamly Place	Battle Creek	2019 (closed)
West & East Michigan Mall	Battle Creek	—
