= NCG Cinemas =

American movie theater chain

- Formerly: Owosso Cinemas (1985–1992); Neighborhood Cinema Group (1992–2000)
- Type: Private
- Industry: Movies
- Founded: 1975; 51 years ago in Owosso, Michigan
- Founder: Jeff Geiger
- Headquarters: Owosso, Michigan, US
- Number of locations: 25
- Key people: Jeff Geiger (president & CEO); Mark Henning (COO)
- Owner: Geiger family
- Website: www.ncgmovies.com

NCG Cinemas (short for Neighborhood Cinema Group) is an American movie theater chain headquartered in Owosso, Michigan. The chain, owned and operated by the Geiger family, consists, at present, of 25 theaters with 147 screens. Most of the theaters are located in Michigan with 10 locations, especially in the Flint/Tri-Cities region and the Greater Lansing area. The group also operates in Florida, Georgia, Illinois, Indiana, New York, North and South Carolina and Tennessee.

== History ==
Until 1985, Shiawassee County, Michigan had no multiplex cinemas. This changed when Owosso's Capitol Theater (now Lebowsky Center) closed. When it was learned that the Capitol would close, Gary Geiger decided to build a multiplex theater in downtown Owosso which opened shortly thereafter. That first theater became, and remains, the headquarters of the NCG Cinema chain. In 1987, Geiger entered the Flint market by purchasing the Clio Cinemas, which had been built in 1974. The Alma Cinemas were built by Geiger in 1989, followed by the Greenville Cinemas the next year. The Geigers consolidated their theater holdings under the Neighborhood Cinema Group branding in 1992, the year the chain's Midland, Michigan theater opened. By the end of the 20th century, two more theaters, located in Lapeer and Coldwater, Michigan, had opened. The company's name was shortened to NCG in early 2000.

The 21st century saw NCG enter the Lansing market in 2002 with their flagship 18-screen location (NCG Eastwood Cinemas) at Eastwood Towne Center. The chain expanded to a second state, Indiana, in 2005 with the opening of a theater in Auburn, near Fort Wayne. A year later, the chain completed a 14-screen theater located in Grand Blanc Township, Michigan, known as the Trillium Cinemas. At the same time, most of their older theaters were retrofitted to include stadium-style seating, and a few of them added more screens. The NCG Trillium Cinemas added an IMAX screen on November 15, 2007, bringing the number of screens at that theater to 15. Shortly thereafter, the Geigers expanded south in Gallatin, Tennessee. Following the closing of the Clio Cinemas in March 2011 (which would reopen in 2011 under the management of Emagine Entertainment), NCG leased the former National Amusements theater at Courtland Center in Burton. The theater, which has six screens, was remodeled entirely, in the former Clio location's equipment, reopening on May 20, 2011, as the NCG Courtland Center Cinemas. In 2008, NCG built a new 12-screen theater near Acworth, Georgia. In 2012, NCG acquired a ten-screen cinema in Marietta, Georgia, from Regal Entertainment Group. The theater was remodeled and reopened that year. That same year, the NCG Eastwood Cinema added its 19th screen, NCG's first X-treme screen (74-feet wide and three stories tall). In 2013, NCG's first Illinois theater, the Kendall Crossing 10, opened in Yorkville, Illinois.

On January 14, 2016, NCG Cinemas took over the Lakeview Square Mall movie theater, Lakeview Square 10, from Carmike Cinemas with plans to immediately close for renovations.

In recent years the chain has expanded to include theaters in the Chattanooga, Tennessee, Metro Atlanta, Chicago areas, Indiana and South Carolina then built another building in North Carolina. On July 21, 2017, another location was opened in Kingsport, Tennessee.

The chain tested serving beer at its concession stand at its Midland theater after a remodeling January 7 to March 1, 2019. In March 2019, NCG announced that beer would be rolled out to its locations started with its Lansing theater.

The cinema operator opened its first foray into New York state on April 19, 2019, with the opening of a 12-theater cineplex at the Hudson Valley Mall in Kingston, New York. Mall management company Hull Property Group said the cineplex would occupy the upgraded space of a 12-theater cineplex operated by Regal Entertainment Group that Regal closed August 16, 2018, five months to the day after Regal was purchased by British movie theater chain Cineworld Group.

In January 2019, NCG Cinemas agreed in January 2019 to lease space in Northeast Plaza on Buford Highway, Brookhaven, Georgia with expectation to open in November 2019. The plaza space was formerly the Atlanta Peach Ballroom, a Latino nightclub, which closed in 2016. Prior to that, the location was a movie theater.
