= Dort Mall =

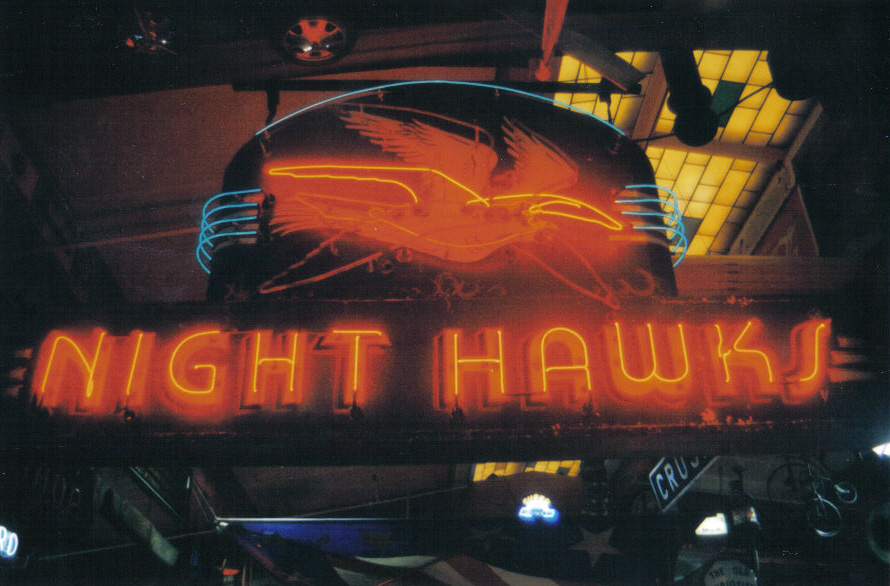
- Night Hawks sign at Dort Mall
- Location: Flint, Michigan, United States
- Coordinates: 42.9908°N 83.6559°W
- Address: 3600 South Dort Highway
- Opened: 1965
- Developer: William Oleksyn
- Owner: Robert Perani Jr. and family
- Num. of anchor tenants: 3
- Floors: 1
- Public transit: MTA

Dort Mall (formerly Small Mall and Mid-America Plaza) is a shopping mall located in Flint, Michigan. It was built in two stages in 1964 and 1965, three years before Courtland Center and five years before Genesee Valley Center, making it the oldest mall in Genesee County. It is owned by the Perani family, who also owns Perani's Hockey World, which along with Bargain Hunterz and City Market, is one of the mall's anchor tenants.

== History ==
Dort Mall was built by local developer William Oleksyn in 1964. It was built on the site of a former drive-in theater and was the first enclosed shopping mall in the Flint area. Its original anchor stores were Yankee Stadium and A&P.

A General Cinema movie theater was added in 1968, was divided into two screens in 1975, and closed in 1983. Also in the 1970s, a discotheque was located in the mall's basement. Despite this addition, the mall had a number of vacancies, especially after the Yankee Stadium store was sold to Zody's and later closed. The mall was renamed Small Mall and Mid-America Plaza in the 1980s, a time at which point Sears Outlet and a comedy club were added. By 1993, the former A&P space had become Big Lots.

The Dort Mall, with 239,000 square feet of interior space on 30 acres, is well known for its antique collection, mostly about automobiles and Mid-Michigan. Some of the antiques are housed inside vacant store locations. Many of the antiques were owned by mall owner Bob Perani. After Big Lots moved out in 2014, their space became a flea market.
