= Twelve Mile Crossing at Fountain Walk =

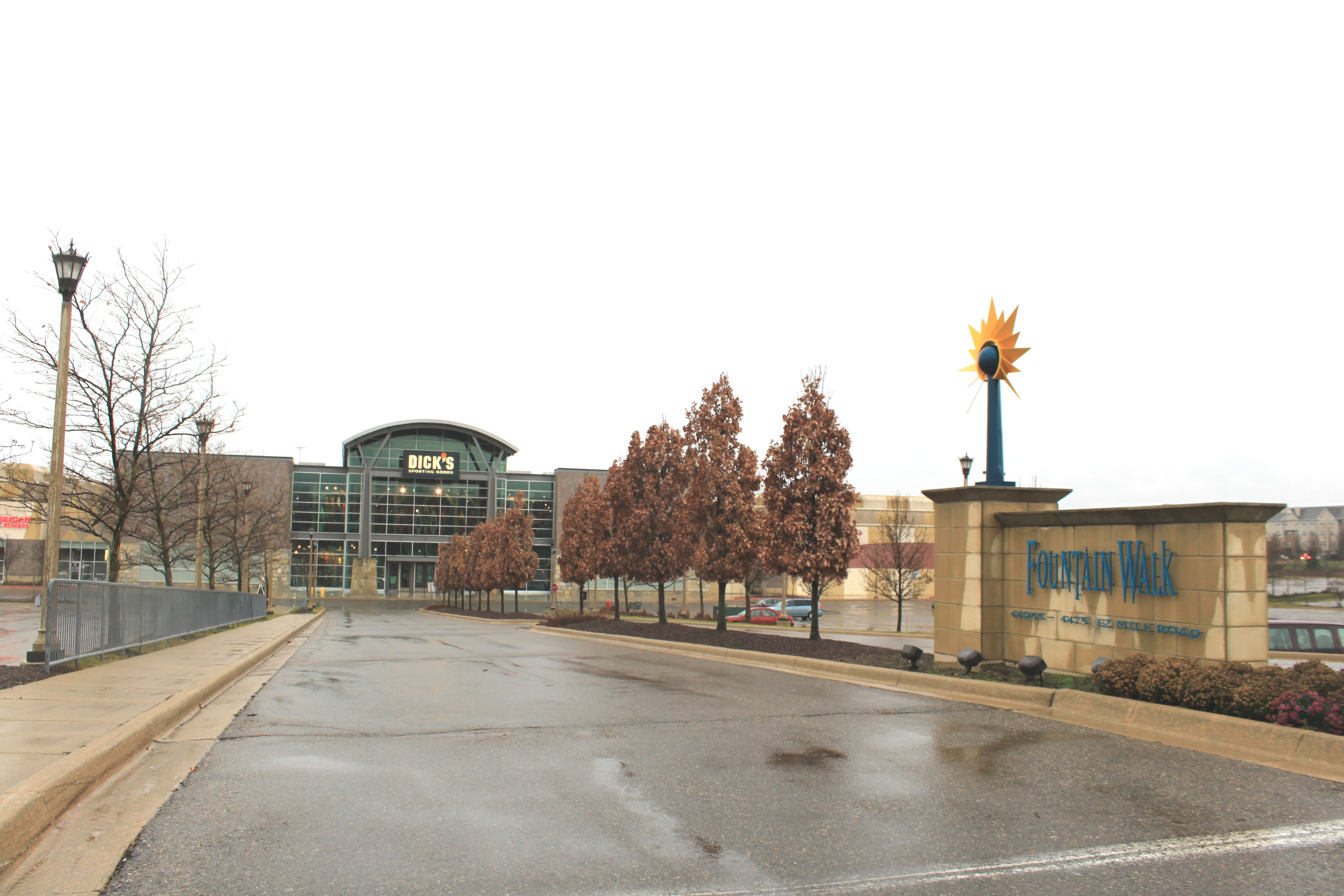
- Entrance on Twelve Mile Road
- Location: Novi, Michigan, United States
- Coordinates: 42.492°N 83.482°W
- Opened: 2002
- Developer: PLC Novi West, Schostak Corporation
- Manager: Transwestern
- Owner: Transwestern
- Num. of stores: 20
- Num. of anchor tenants: 3
- Floor area: 737,000 square feet (68,469.5 m^{2})
- Floors: 1
- Public transit: SMART 740, 805

Twelve Mile Crossing at Fountain Walk is an open-air lifestyle center retail complex located across from the super-regional Twelve Oaks Mall in the city of Novi, Michigan, a suburb of Detroit. The center features Dick's Sporting Goods and Floor & Decor its anchor stores, as well as a movie theater, game room, and several restaurants.

== History ==
After initial delays that saw the cancellation of two proposed anchor stores (a Jillian's and a movie theater), construction began on Fountain Walk in late 2001. The mall's owner, PLC Novi West, initially worked with Taubman Centers and Ramco-Gershenson, two Detroit-area based developers; Schostak Corporation was later hired as a leasing agent.

The first stores to open were Galyan's Trading Company and The Great Indoors. A year later, the rest of the mall opened to the public. Additional renovations brought Emagine Novi- an 18-screen movie theater- and a game room called Lucky Strike to the center. The entire Galyan's chain was acquired and re-branded by Dick's Sporting Goods in 2004. Later that year, the mall's developers filed Chapter 11 bankruptcy.

Difficulty of access to the mall has been cited as a factor limiting the center's growth, as the mall lacks visibility from 12 Mile Road, Novi Road, and Interstate 96, the three major roads that surround it. The center has been no more than seventy percent leased since its opening, and several major tenants have closed. Modern Skate & Surf announced on its website that it was moving because "the landlord is remodeling the mall and our building will be torn down."

Approximately 60,000 square feet (5,574.2 m^{2}) of the mall was demolished in 2006 and re-developed; similarly, another large part of the mall which housed Modern Skate was demolished in July 2008. Additional big-box stores were added during the renovation, including a Powerhouse Gym. The center was also renamed Twelve Mile Crossing at Fountain Walk. Cost Plus World Market announced the closure of all its Detroit locations in April 2008. The middle portion of the mall was then torn down, and a large section of retail space was converted to a gym. After parent company Sears closed all of its Great Indoors stores in 2012, the location at Fountain Walk was converted to a Sears Outlet store. Mall developers have also presented the City of Novi with a plan to construct multiple tenant buildings along with a large retail/supermarket space to be built behind Dick's.

On August 14, 2019, Sears Outlet closed. Floor & Decor has since moved into the vacated store.
