= Summit Place Mall =

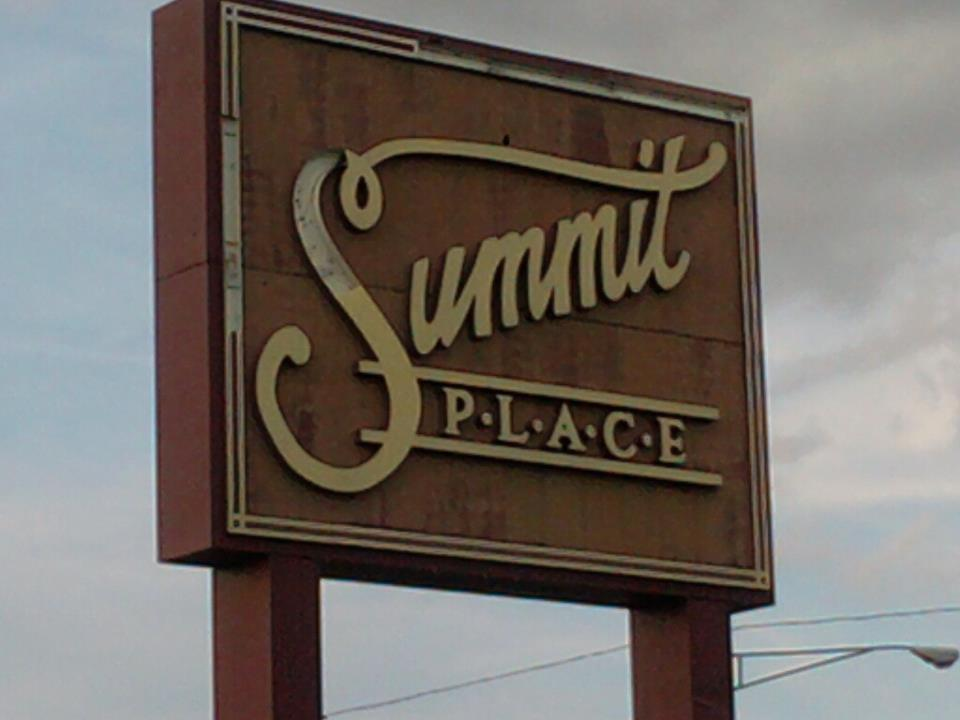
- Location: Waterford Township, Michigan, United States
- Coordinates: 42.643438°N 83.329293°W
- Address: 315 N. Telegraph Road
- Opened: May 10, 1962; 64 years ago
- Closed: September 10, 2009; 17 years ago (mall corridors); December 7, 2014; 11 years ago (last remaining anchor)
- Demolished: Started May 7, 2019
- Previous names: Pontiac Mall (1962–1983)
- Developer: A & W Management
- Num. of stores: approx. 200 at peak
- Num. of anchor tenants: 6
- Floor area: 1,400,000 sq ft (130,000 m^{2})
- Floors: 1 (2 in former Sears and JCPenney's, 3 in former Macy's)

Summit Place Mall, originally Pontiac Mall, was a shopping mall in Waterford Township, Michigan, United States. Opened in 1962 as the first enclosed mall in Michigan, it was built on a 74-acre (30 ha) site. After expansions in 1987 and 1993, it comprised more than 1,400,000 square feet (130,000 m^{2}) of retail space. At its peak, it had approximately 200 inline tenants and six anchor stores: Hudson's (later Marshall Field's, then Macy's), Sears, J. C. Penney, Montgomery Ward, Service Merchandise, and Kohl's.

Following the opening of Great Lakes Crossing Outlets in nearby Auburn Hills, Michigan in 1998, Summit Place Mall lost many of its tenants to this newer mall, also losing Service Merchandise and Montgomery Ward to their respective bankruptcies in 1999 and 2000. In the 2000s, Summit Place became a dead mall as the majority of its stores closed. Kohl's closed in March 2009 and the mall concourses were closed off in September 2009. J.C. Penney and Macy's remained until early 2010, and Sears until 2014.

== History ==
Michigan's first enclosed shopping center, Pontiac Mall was built at the northwest corner of Telegraph Road (US 24) and Elizabeth Lake Road, on the boundary between the city of Pontiac and Waterford Township. Two tenants opened ahead of the mall: a Kroger supermarket began operation in 1961, and a Montgomery Ward department store in February 1962. Opening on Thursday, May 10, 1962, the mall featured one other major department store: a "budget" branch of Detroit-based Hudson's, which unlike the existing Hudson's stores, did not feature furniture or small appliances. It was later upgraded to a full-line Hudson's store. Among the mall's 42 inline tenants on opening day were a Cunningham Drug pharmacy and a Kresge dime store. It occupied 500,000 square feet (46,000 m^{2}) of store area overall. The mall was built by A&W Management (later known as Ramco-Gershenson and now known as RPT Realty) and its architect was A. Arnold Agree, son of Detroit architect Charles N. Agree. The mall concourses featured over 120 sculptures. Sears built a 181,900-square-foot (16,900 m^{2}) store north of the property in 1972, although this store was not part of the mall at the time. In 1972, an elephant named Little Jenny, who starred in the movie Elephant Walk, was buried on the mall site.

Ramco-Gershenson announced renovation plans on the mall in 1983. According to then-company treasurer Dennis Gershenson, the mall had "fallen behind current shopping center design" and had lost many key tenants such as the Cunningham Drug store due to chains going out of business. The $1,000,000 renovation included new store facades, floors, and ceilings, plus renovated designs for Hudson's and Montgomery Ward. Foot Locker and Kinney Shoes were relocated to new storefronts, while new tenants such as Musicland, Circus World, The Limited, Casual Corner, Sibley's Shoes, Gap, and B. Dalton were added. Following the renovations, the mall was renamed Summit Place Mall.

J. C. Penney opened at the mall in August 1988, replacing a store in Bloomfield Township. This was part of an expansion first announced in 1987, which added 470,000 square feet (44,000 m^{2}) of retail space, along with a Service Merchandise catalog showroom, a MainStreet department store (bought out by Kohl's soon after opening), and a connection to the existing Sears. Also included in the new construction was a food court called Picnic Place.

=== Late 1990s–early 2000s: Decline ===
Service Merchandise and Montgomery Ward closed in 1999 and 2001, respectively, as both chains declared bankruptcy. Also in 2000, Hudson's was remodeled, before being renamed Marshall Field's a year later. After the loss of these two anchors, Summit Place Mall began losing inline tenants, primarily to Great Lakes Crossing Outlets, which opened in nearby Auburn Hills, Michigan in 1998.

General Growth Properties sold Summit Place Mall in 2002 to California-based Namco Financial. Namco announced plans to change the name of the mall to Festivals of Waterford, and add a family entertainment center as well as a $700,000 kid's play area and a waterpark, the latter of which would be located in the former Montgomery Ward. That December, the children's play area opened, although the waterpark plans were canceled after the city decided not to risk the $20 million indoor waterpark, fearing that the income could not repay the debt.

=== Mid-late 2000–early 2010s ===
State legislative action in 2005 resulted in a law that would allow the owners of Summit Place to receive a tax abatement for redevelopment of the site. The proposed redevelopment called for demolition of half of the mall, and the rezoning of much of the property to include housing.

Marshall Field's was renamed Macy's in September 2006 after Marshall Field's parent company May Co. was purchased by Federated Department Stores (now Macy's, Inc.). In August 2007, Waterford Township explored the creation of a "Corridor Improvement Authority," or CIA, to look into future uses for the property. The mall continued to lose tenants throughout the mid-2000s, including all tenants in the food court and the children's playplace. Kohl's closed on March 12, 2009. Following the closure of this anchor, the mall became 96% vacant. The entire mall closed, except for the three remaining anchors, on September 10, 2009. Both J.C. Penney and Macy's closed in March 2010, following closure announcements in January. Sears, the last tenant of the mall, announced its closure in September 2014.

On December 7, 2014, the store closed, leaving the entire mega-shopping hub vacant and thus it became a magnet for vandals, vagrants and scrappers. The next day, Waterford Township placed the mall on its dangerous buildings list and called for its owners, SD Capital LLC of California, to either fix up the mall or tear it down. In September 2018, ARi-El Enterprises, a Southfield-based real estate firm, purchased the mall for an undisclosed sum. Demolition on the mall began on May 7, 2019. The site is set to be redeveloped into a business center called Oakland County Business Center.

== See also ==
- List of shopping malls in Michigan
