= Kinepolis =

Movie theater chain

Kinepolis Group NV

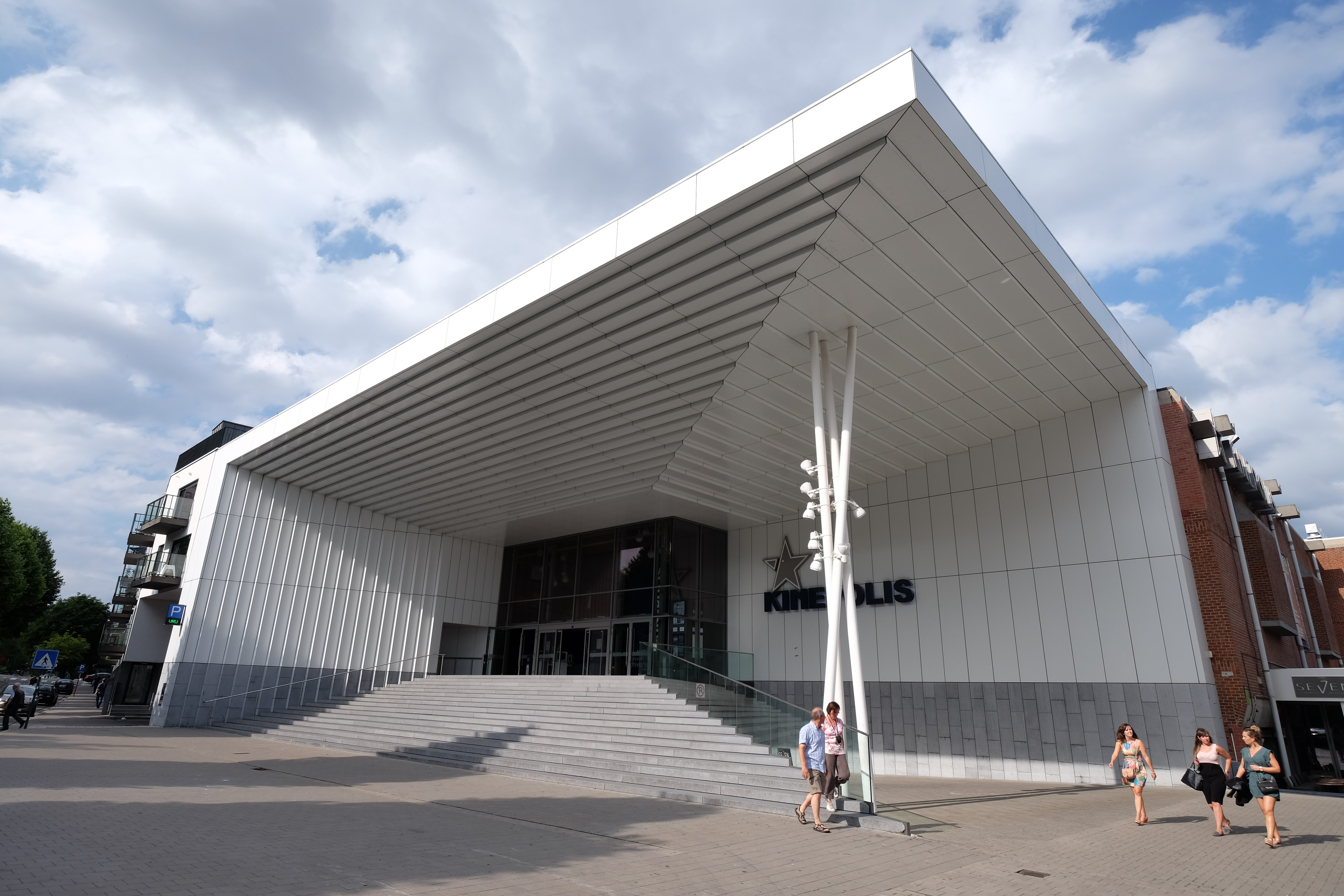
- Kinepolis in Gent
- Type: Public (NV)
- Traded as: Euronext Brussels: KIN
- Industry: Cinema, film distribution
- Founded: 1997
- Headquarters: Ghent, Belgium
- Key people: Eddy Duquenne (CEO); Joost Bert (Chairman); Philip Ghekiere (Vice-Chairman)
- Revenue: 564,900,000 euro (2025)
- Net income: 41,100,000 euro (2025)
- Number of employees: 4,600
- Subsidiaries: Landmark Cinemas; Showcase Cinemas
- Website: www.kinepolis.com corporate.kinepolis.com

The Kinepolis Group is a Belgian cinema chain with 110 theaters in Europe and North America. It is Europe’s third-largest cinema chain.

== History ==
The Kinepolis Group is a Belgian cinema chain formed in 1997 as a result of the merger of two family cinema groups, Bert and Claeys, and has been listed on the stock exchange since 1998.

Albert Bert started in the film industry in 1970 and in 1981 built the 12 screen Decascoops cinema in Ghent, Belgium. He owned the cinema with his wife, Marie-Suzanne, and their four sons. They also owned a five screen cinema in Kortrijk, the Pentascoop, and the seven screen Trioscoop in Hasselt.

On 29 September 1988, Bert opened the Kinepolis Brussels, which was considered to be the first megaplex cinema in the world when it was finally completed with 25 screens and 7,600 seats.

Marie-Suzanne's sister, Rose Claeys, ran the Trioscoop as well as the Trosgenk in Genk and three cinemas in Liège (Les Operas, the Palace and the Concorde).

On 17 September 1998, the world's largest cinema megaplex, Kinepolis Madrid Ciudad de la Imagen, opened in Spain, with 25 screens and 9,200 seating capacity, with each seating between 211 and 996 people.

In 2006, the Claeys family withdrew from the venture, selling most of its 25% stake of shares in the company and transferring daily management to Joost Bert, who, since 2008, shares the position of CEO with Eddy Duquenne. On December 13 2018, Kinepolis Kortrijk Closed its old unit.

=== Competition authority ===
The Belgian competition authority approved the merger of the company in 1997 on the condition that the company was not allowed to grow within Belgium without explicit consent of the authority. This resulted in the resale of the acquired Utopolis cinemas in 2015. Kinepolis tried on several occasions to get the authority to lift the ban, and they succeeded in 2020. From August 2021, the company does not need permission to open new locations within Belgium.

=== Growth and acquisitions ===
Kinepolis grew significantly in recent years by opening several new locations, but also by acquiring chains and independent cinemas. Significant acquisitions were Wolff Bioscopen in 2014, Utopolis in 2015, Canadian chain Landmark Cinemas in 2017, American chains MJR Cinemas in 2019, Emagine Entertainment in 2025, and Showcase Cinemas in 2026.

In 2011, the company also acquired Brightfish, a Belgian company specialised in cinema advertising.

== Core businesses ==
The Kinepolis Group consists of seven core businesses; box office, in-theater sales (ITS), business-to-business (B2B), film distribution, screen advertising, real estate, and digital cinema services.
