= Green Oak Village Place =

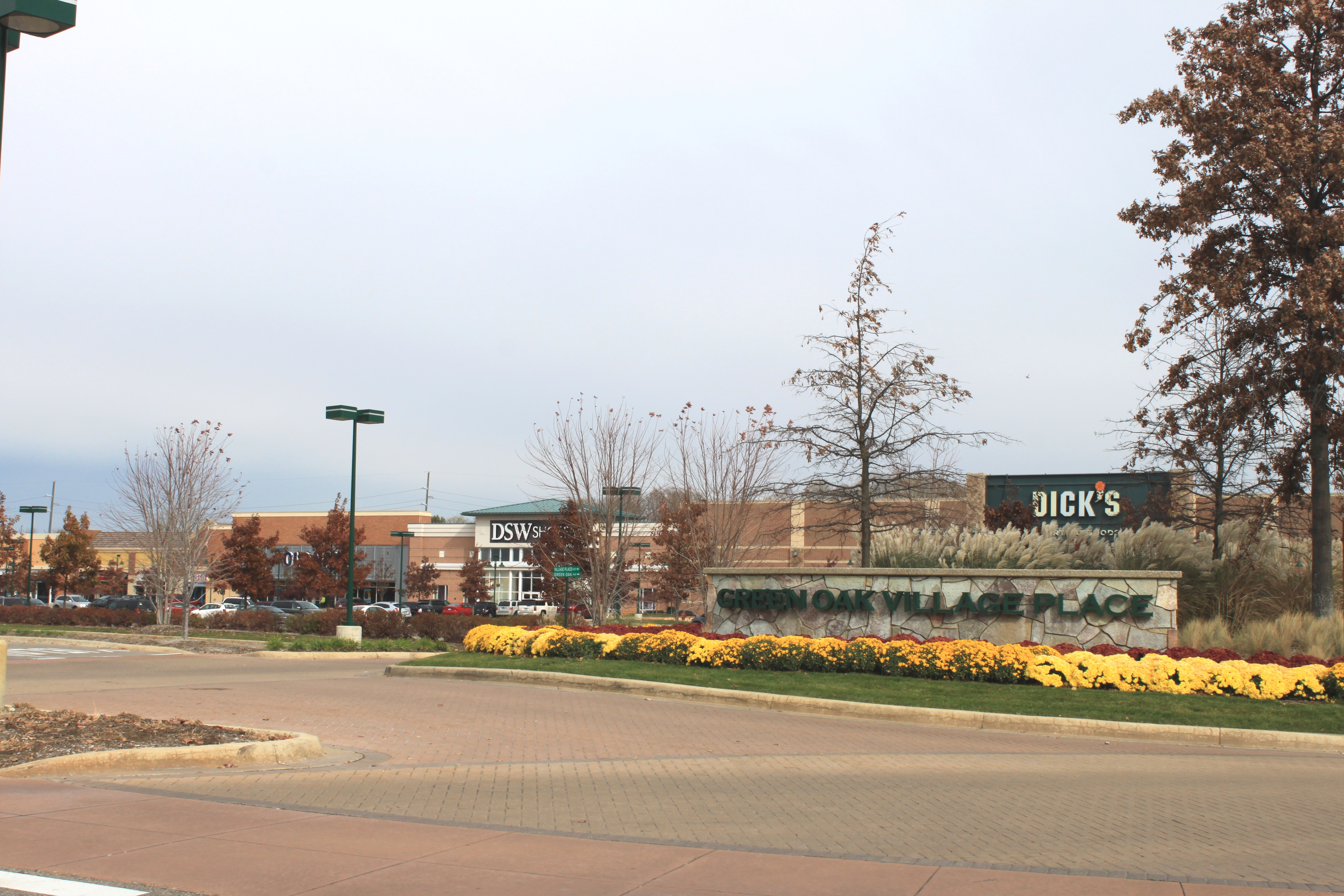
- Location: Brighton, Michigan, United States
- Coordinates: 42.5069°N 83.7539°W
- Address: 9608 Village Place Boulevard
- Opened: October 27, 2006; 20 years ago
- Developer: Lormax Stern, REDICO, Quadrants, Inc.
- Manager: REDICO
- Owner: Green Oak Village Place I, LLC and Green Oak Village Place Phase II Owner, LLC
- Architect: Rogvoy Architects, PC
- Num. of stores: 40+
- Num. of anchor tenants: 6
- Floor area: 550,000 square feet (51,000 m^{2})
- Floors: 1

Green Oak Village Place is a power center located in Green Oak Township, serving Brighton, Michigan, United States. The mall, opened in stages between 2006 and 2008, includes six anchor stores: Barnes & Noble, Dick's Sporting Goods, DSW Shoe Warehouse, HomeGoods, JCPenney, Pier 1 Imports; Five Below; TJ Maxx and more than forty inline tenants. It is managed by REDICO.

== History ==
Prior to the construction of Green Oak Village Place, the only shopping mall in Brighton was Brighton Mall, a 20-store complex originally anchored by A&P and Grant City, which was demolished in 1996 for big-box stores, including Marshalls and Best Buy.

Following the construction of several new homes in the area, as well as increase in traffic along US-23 and Interstate 96, plans were made in 2004 to build a new lifestyle center called Green Oak Village Place at the interchange of U.S. 23 and Lee Road southeast of town. A small shopping center featuring Costco and Kohl's had already been built at the southwestern quadrant of this interchange. In December 2004, a preliminary approval was granted to build the center, which was developed by Lormax Stern in association with REDICO and Quadrants, Inc. The city's officials formed a task force to determine the impact that the mall would have on the city's downtown business district. Construction began in June 2005, ahead of schedule. At the same time, the Lee Road interchange with U.S. 23 was rebuilt to include three roundabouts, leading one local resident to create a board game based on the roundabouts.

Three of Green Oak Village Place's anchors — DSW Shoe Warehouse, Dick's Sporting Goods and Old Navy — were the first stores to open, doing so in mid-2006. Barnes & Noble opened as the fourth anchor on October 25, followed by a grand opening of the mall on October 27. Inline stores began opening in October as well. Two months after the mall opened, a display at the Victoria's Secret store led to boycotts and protests from members of the community.

A 104,000-square-foot (9,700 m^{2}) JCPenney department store opened in March 2007, and HomeGoods opened as a sixth anchor in September 2008. TJ Maxx opened in 2016 In 2020, Pier 1 Imports closed after the company filed for bankruptcy in February.
