= Kessel Food Markets =

Former supermarket chain in the United States

- Company type: Private
- Industry: Retail
- Founded: Corunna, Michigan, 1981
- Founder: Al Kessel
- Defunct: 1999
- Fate: purchased by Kroger
- Headquarters: Grand Blanc, Michigan, United States
- Number of locations: 24
- Area served: Flint, Michigan-Saginaw, Michigan, area
- Products: Groceries
- Owner: Al Kessel

Kessel Food Markets was an American supermarket chain based in Michigan. It began in 1981 when Owosso, Michigan, native Al Kessel, a former executive vice president of Hamady supermarkets, purchased Kroger locations in Corunna and Saginaw. Kroger closed these stores due to Michigan's poor economy at the time, and failure to reach union agreements. After Kroger closed all five of its Flint locations in 1982 for the same reasons, Kessel purchased them as well, followed by 13 Hamady stores after that chain filed for bankruptcy in 1991. At its peak, Kessel Food Markets comprised 24 stores. Kessel filmed his own television commercials for the chain, in which he would throw items into a grocery cart and state, "Save at Kessel this week. Why? Because we're with you."

The Kessel chain was frequently targeted by workers' unions in Saginaw. By 1999, four of the Kessel stores had been converted to Save-A-Lot or closed, while the rest were sold to Kroger, which briefly continued to operate them under the Kessel name before converting them. Kessel's company, Kessel Enterprises of Grand Blanc, Michigan, continued to operate the Save-a-Lot stores and local Pet Supplies Plus stores.

Kessel died December 28, 2012, at age 74 of esophageal cancer, in Naples, Florida.
