= Chatham (grocer) =

Supermarket chain, now-defunct

Chatham Supermarkets
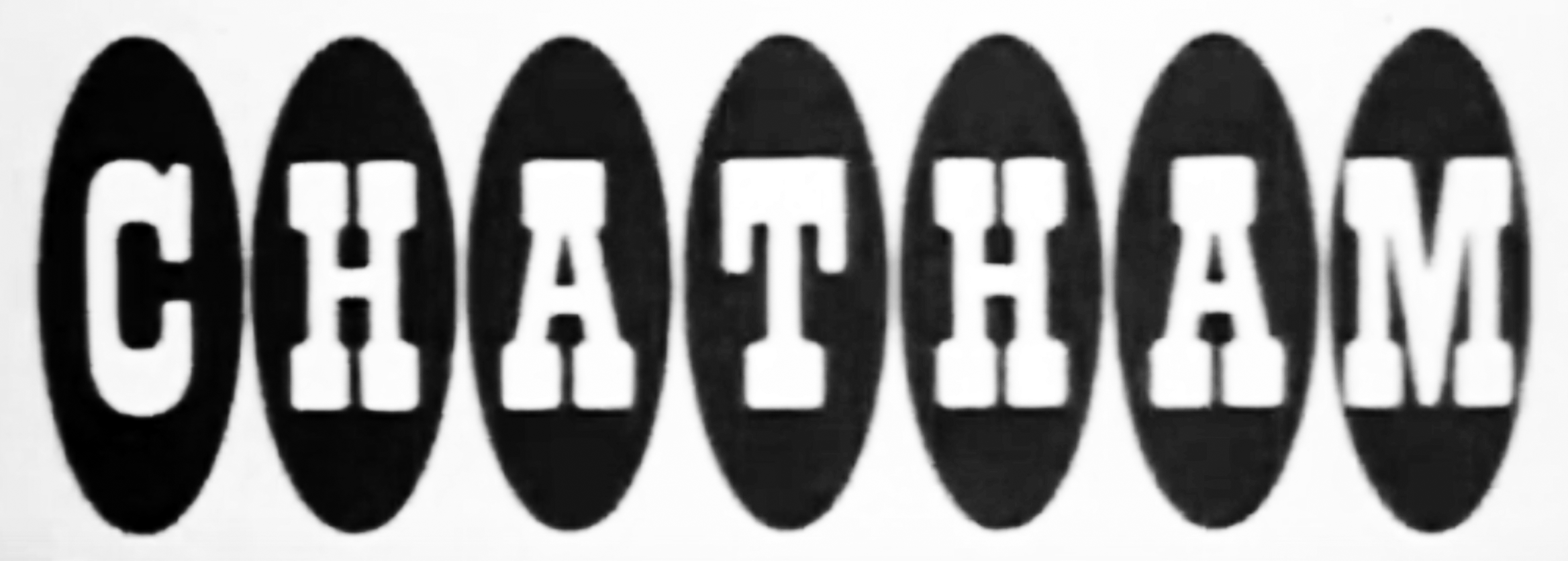
- Company type: Private
- Industry: Retail
- Founded: mid-1950s Michigan, United States
- Defunct: 1987
- Fate: Defunct
- Headquarters: Detroit
- Key people: Alex Dandy
- Products: Groceries
- Owners: Last owner Alex Dandy

Chatham was a supermarket chain, now-defunct, headquartered in southeastern Michigan, United States.

== History ==
The Weisberg family, already in the grocery business, purchased Chatham Village Supermarket in 1947. By 1963, Chatham (the "Village" having been dropped) had grown to nine stores in East Side Detroit. Peter Weisberg served as president and chairman of the board and various other family members occupied top executive positions. By August 1968, it had grown to 24 stores.

In 1975, it was the first company in the Michigan area to try out the Universal Product Code.

In October 1980, it was believed that Chatham was the second largest supermarket chain in the region by number of stores (44) and sales volume (around $550 million), behind Farmer Jack, although this could not be confirmed because Chatham was privately owned and did not provide any data. That year, it also had three Warehouse Way discount drugstores and a Chatham Plus superstore and opened a warehouse store called Pak-n-Save. In 1982, the Chatham Plus five-year experiment was considered a failure, as was a wholesale meat processing plant; opening in 1966, the latter closed in January 1979. At the time of its sale in May 1985, the chain had either 50 stores, 39 stores, or 33 supermarkets and eight Pak-n-Saves; it was purchased by Nu-Trax, Inc., headed by Wendell Smith.

In March 1986, Nu-Trax was purchased by Alex Dandy, a businessman who owned the Hamady Brothers food chain in Flint, Michigan, at which point Chatham was down to 21 stores and 1000 employees. Under his leadership, all but two stores were shut down. Dandy illegally diverted assets of the company to his personal benefit, and Chatham was forced to file for bankruptcy in 1987. Dandy was convicted in 1991, of tax offenses, mail fraud, bankruptcy fraud, and obstruction of justice.
