= Brighton Mall =

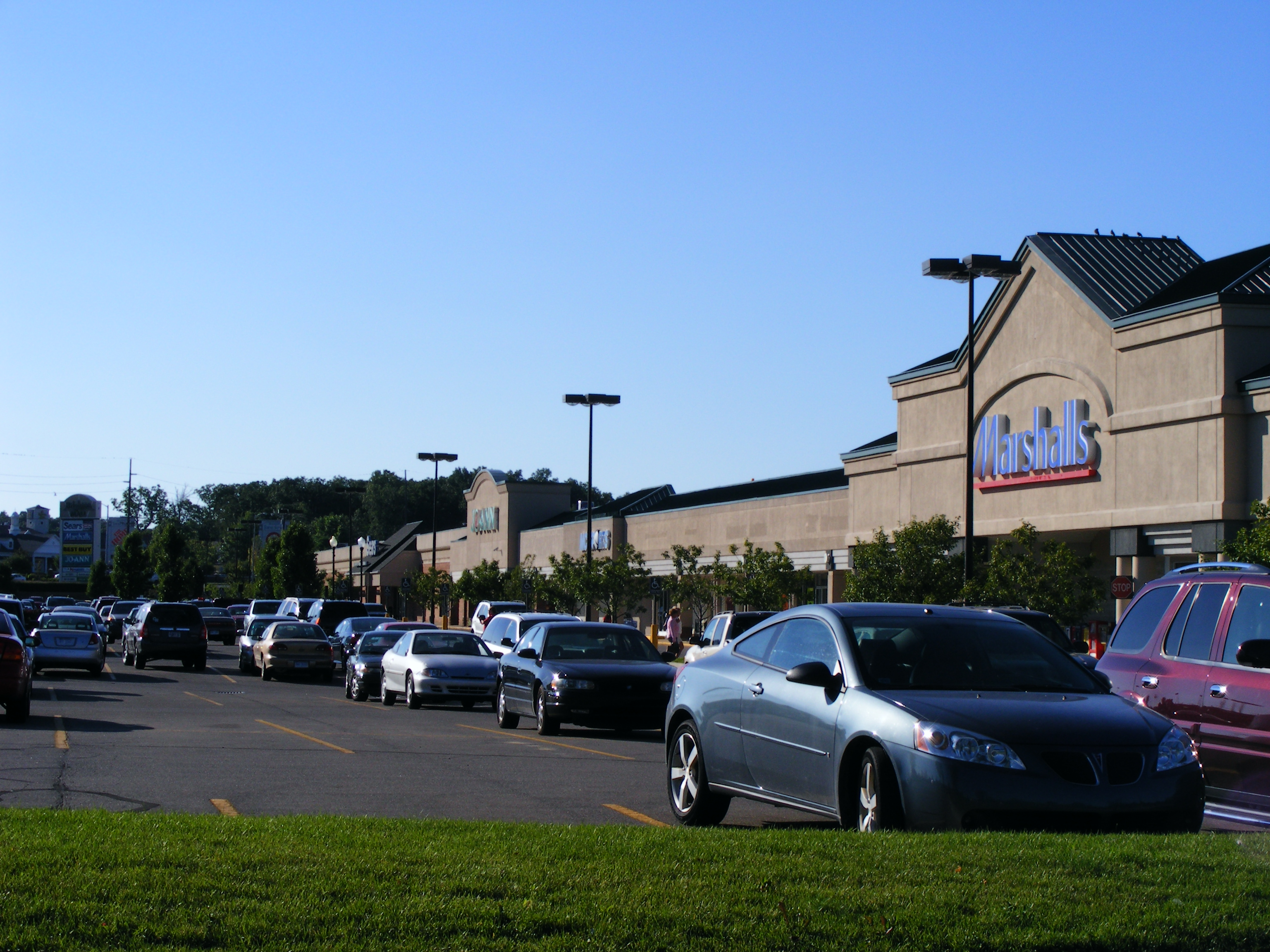
- Location: Brighton, Michigan, United States
- Coordinates: 42.54413°N 83.78602°W
- Opened: 1971 (original indoor mall) 1996 (current power centre)
- Closed: 1996 (original indoor mall)
- Manager: Detroit Development
- Num. of stores: 13
- Num. of anchor tenants: 7
- Floor area: 290,000 sq ft (27,000 m^{2})
- Floors: 1

Brighton Mall is a shopping mall located in Brighton, Michigan, United States. Opened in 1971 as an enclosed shopping mall, the center was re-developed in 1996 as a power centre, retaining the name Brighton Mall. Anchor stores for the property are Marshalls, Michaels, Aldi, PetSmart, Jo-Ann Etc., Best Buy, and Gardner-White Furniture.

== History ==
Brighton Mall opened in November 1971 as a small enclosed mall, with A&P supermarket, a W.T. Grant department store, a Perry Drug Stores pharmacy, and approximately twenty-five inline tenants. One year later, a movie theater opened behind the mall. After W. T. Grant filed for bankruptcy in 1975, many of their stores were sold to Kmart in 1976. Kmart had originally wanted to build a store in Brighton prior to acquiring the former W. T. Grant location, but did not do so at the time due to concerns over the area's economy.

In late 1993, plans were announced to begin converting the mall to a strip mall. Under these plans, the enclosed section of the mall would be converted to larger retail spaces that faced Grand River Avenue, while the Kmart would be retained. The few remaining tenants in the mall at the time, including an Ace Hardware, a beauty salon, and an ice cream shop, would be relocated to an annex next to the mall. In 1995, in completion of this conversion, A&P demolished its existing store at the mall and built a larger Farmer Jack supermarket on the site.

The mall's movie theater complex, by then part of the MJR Theatres chain, relocated across the street to a new 16-screen (since expanded to 20 screens) facility in 2002, and the old theaters were replaced with Best Buy and PetSmart. Marshalls replaced Farmer Jack, which closed in 2004. In 2006, Kmart was converted to Sears Essentials. This store closed in 2012. That space has since been divided between Gardner-White Furniture, Michaels, Aldi, and Aspen Dental.

The week of July 26, 2014, Halo Burger opened it seventeenth location at the Mall next to YoFresh Yogurt Cafe, which is also new.
