= Eastwood Towne Center =

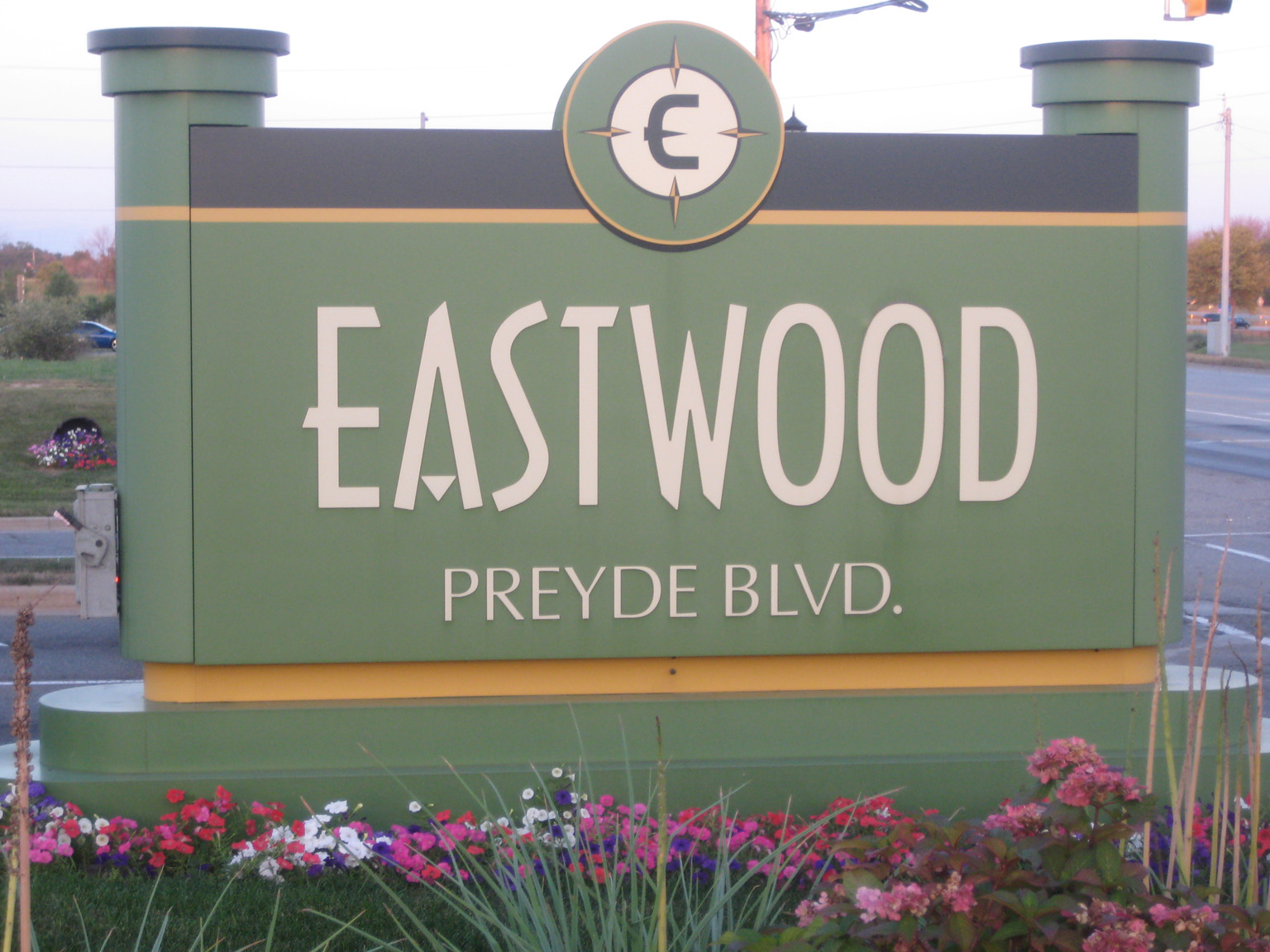
- Eastwood Towne Center entrance sign
- Location: Lansing Charter Township, Michigan, United States
- Coordinates: 42.76239°N 84.51572°W
- Opened: 2002
- Developer: Jeffrey R. Anderson Real Estate
- Manager: Kite Realty Group Trust
- Owner: Kite Realty Group Trust
- Num. of stores: over 55
- Num. of anchor tenants: 4
- Floor area: 332,131 sq ft (30,856.0 m^{2})
- Floors: 1
- Public transit: CATA

Eastwood Towne Center is an open-air shopping mall and lifestyle center located in Lansing Charter Township, Michigan, United States at the northwest corner of the intersection of Lake Lansing Road and U.S. 127. Its anchor stores include NCG Cinemas, Dick's Sporting Goods, DSW Shoe Warehouse, and Pottery Barn. The center is owned, managed, and leased by Kite Realty Group Trust.

== Development & History ==
Developed by Jeffrey R. Anderson Real Estate and opened in 2002, as of 2017 Eastwood Towne Center includes "over 55 shops, services, [and] restaurants" and features a 19-screen cinema. It includes 332,131 sq ft (30,856 sq m) of leasable space.

In March 2010 construction was planned to begin on a 42,000 sq ft (3,900 m^{2}) expansion to the mall. The $85 million expansion will include a new parking deck, condos, upscale apartments, additional shops and restaurants, and an addition to the NCG cinemas movie theater. In June 2011 Lansing Township issued $22 million in bonds to cover some of the development costs and signed a lease for the 13 acres (5.3 ha) site.

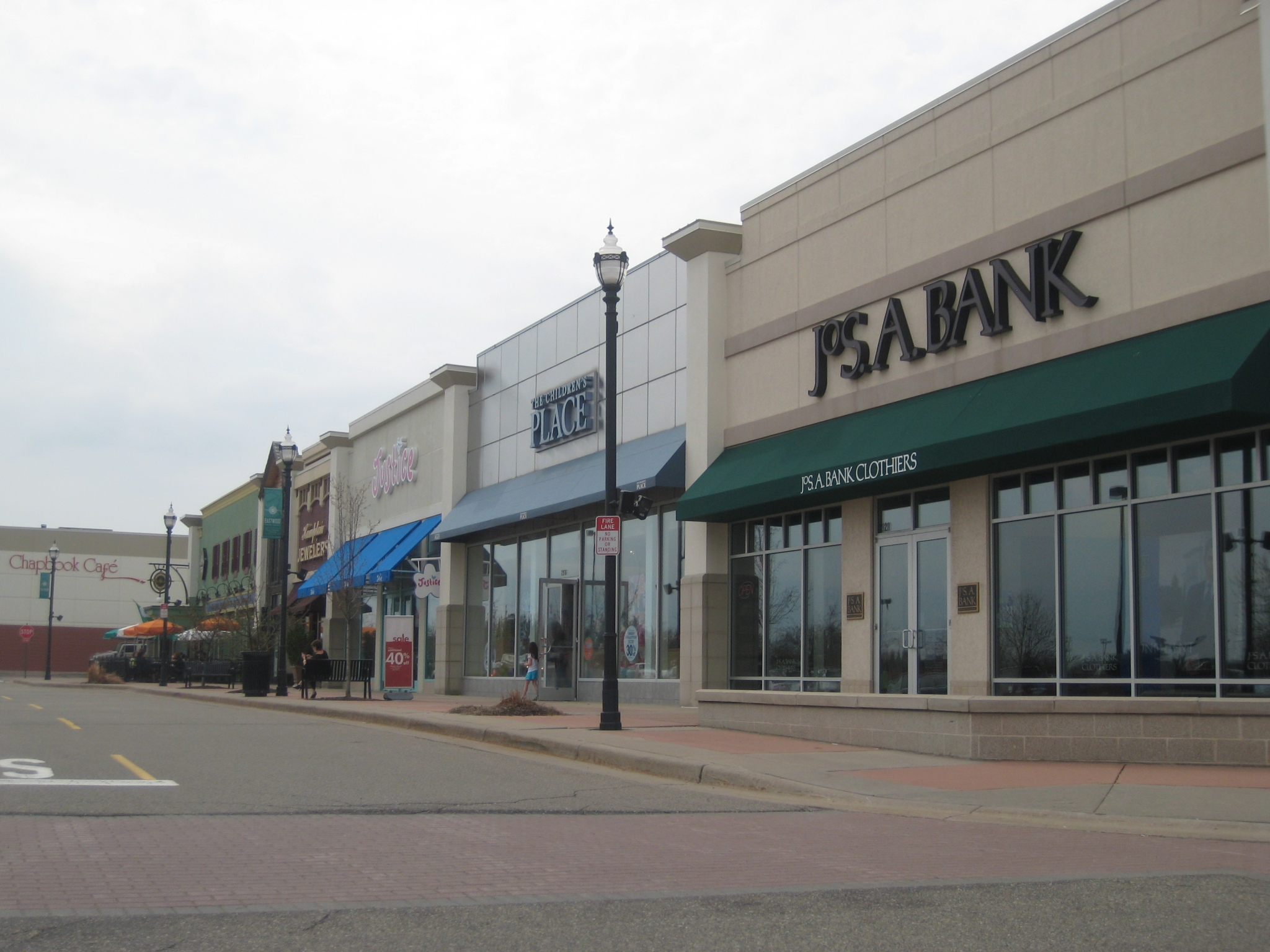
Storefronts at Eastwood Towne Center

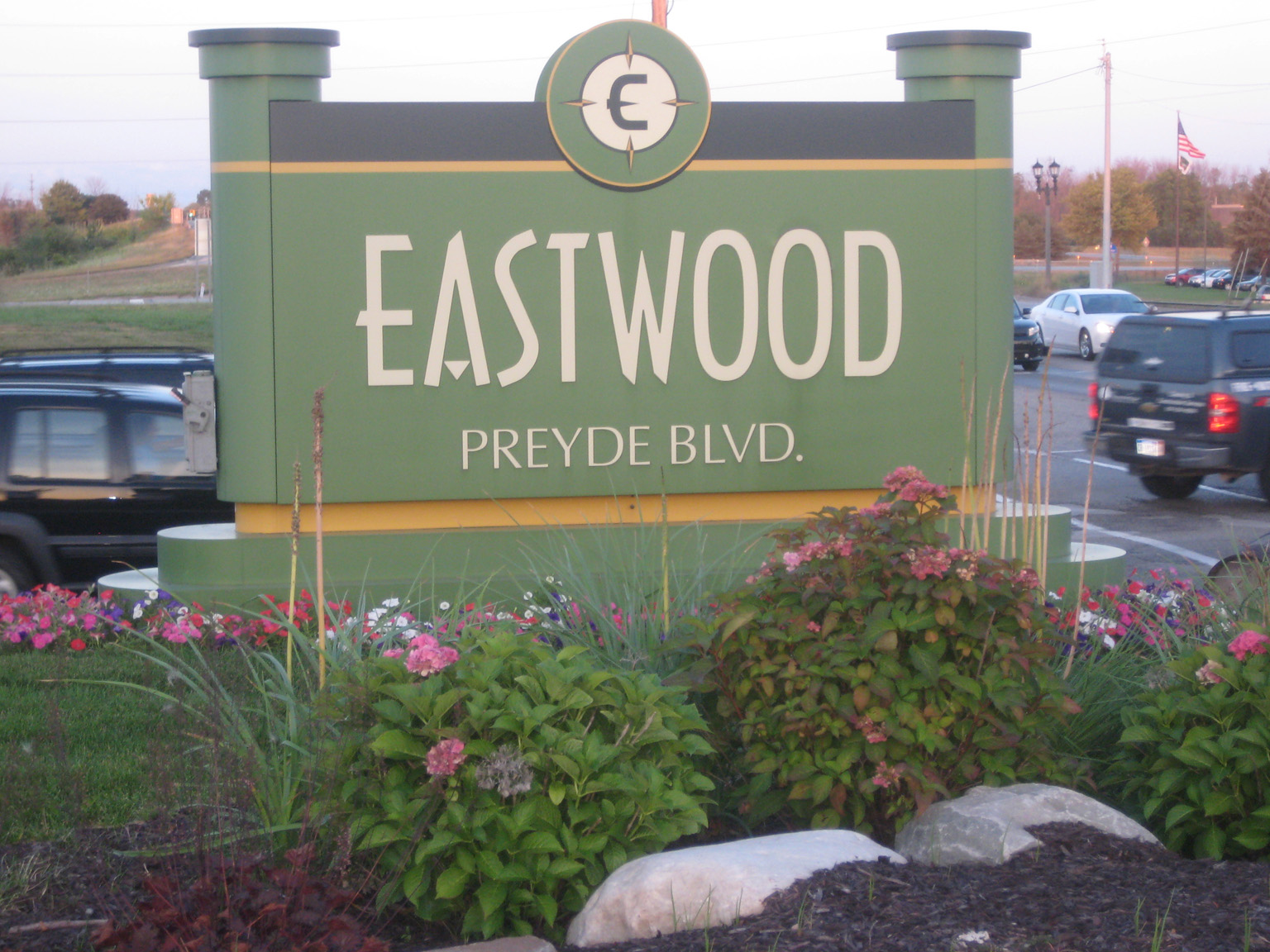
Eastwood Towne Center sign at Preyde Blvd and Lake Lansing Road

== See also ==
- List of shopping malls in Michigan
