= MJR Theatres =

American cinema chain

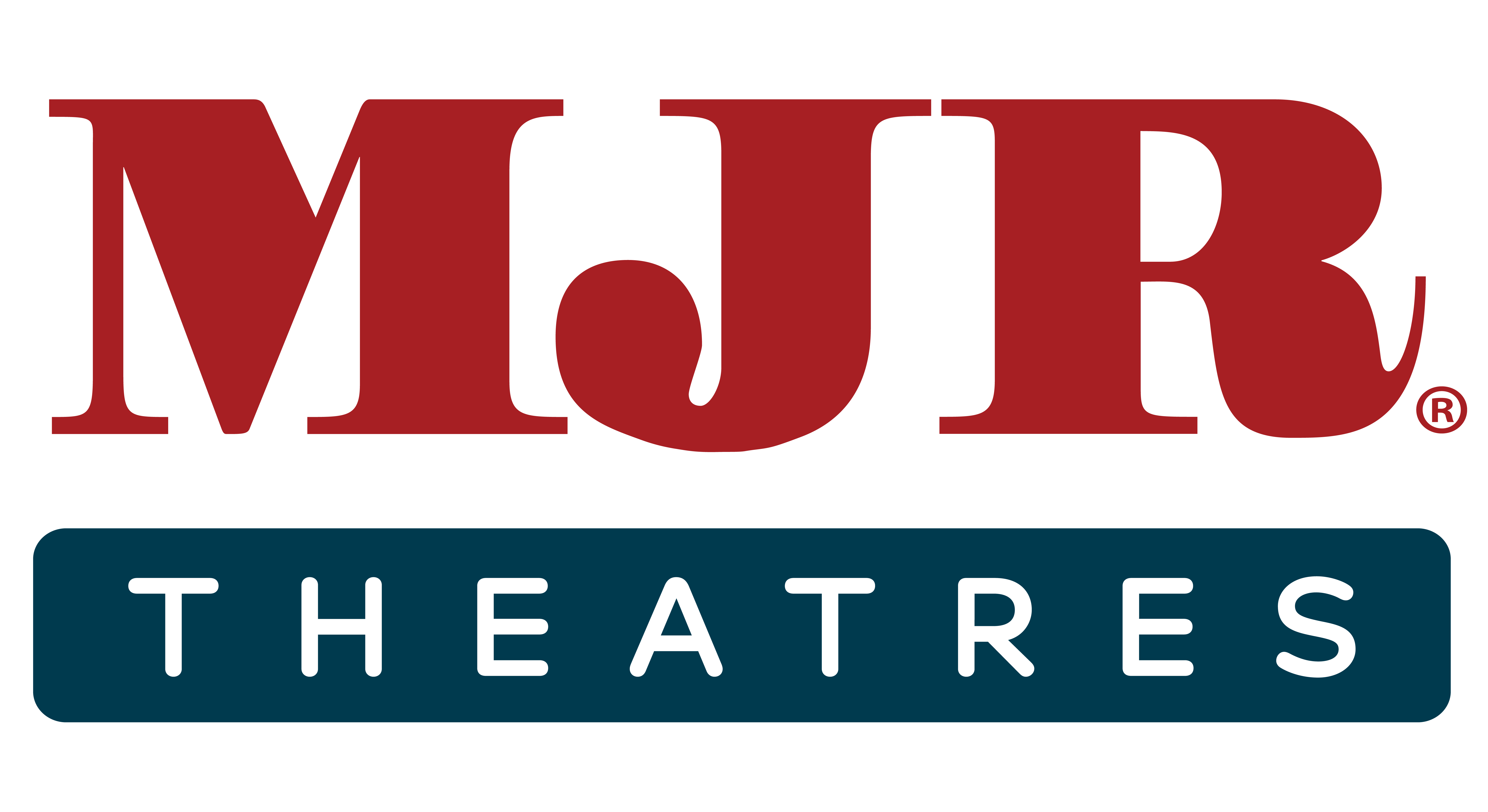
- Formerly: Union
- Industry: Entertainment
- Founded: 1980; 46 years ago in Royal Oak, Michigan
- Headquarters: Bloomfield Hills, Michigan, United States
- Number of locations: 10
- Area served: United States
- Key people: Mike Mihalich (founder); Erwin Six (Kinepolis Integration Support Manager)
- Owner: Kinepolis
- Number of employees: 700 (2019)
- Website: www.mjrtheatres.com

MJR Theatres is an American cinema chain based in Bloomfield Hills, Michigan. A subsidiary of Kinepolis, it owns 10 theaters in the Metro Detroit area, operating around 160 screens.

== History ==
MJR Theatres was created in 1980 by Mike Mihalich with the acquisition of Main Theatre in Royal Oak, Michigan. Main Theatre was sold in 1997 and later demolished to make way for a new mixed-use development. The name MJR was taken from their original slogan Movies Just Right. During the 1980s and 1990s, the company purchased several theaters and drive-ins in Michigan. Following their acquisitions, the company started building their own multiplex cinemas, with the first opening in Adrian, Michigan in 1990. In order to finance the new cinemas, MJR sold some of its existing theaters and drive-ins.

During the 1990s, Luna Enterprises purchased an interest in the chain.

In 2014, MJR introduced a premium large format (PLF) known as "The Epic Experience", which uses a 65-foot screen and Dolby Atmos sound.

In 2019, the chain was acquired for $152.25 million by Belgian exhibitor Kinepolis, This marked the chain's entry into the U.S. market, after having entered the Canadian market via its acquisition of Landmark Cinemas.

After the acquisition, MJR began to deploy the Kinepolis "Laser Ultra" PLF (with renovated auditoriums adding reclining seats) in 2022 at the Brighton location, and became part of Kinepolis's existing partnerships with CJ CGV and IMAX Corporation, including opening a new IMAX with Laser auditorium with reclining seats at the Southgate location in 2023, and Michigan's first ScreenX auditorium at its Waterford location in June 2024. Two more ScreenX auditoriums were then added at the Marketplace and Westland cinemas. MJR then added another IMAX with Laser auditorium at the Troy location in July 2025, replacing “The Epic Experience” format.

Kinepolis would later acquire one of MJR's local competitors, Emagine Entertainment, in 2025.

The IMAX, ScreenX, and Laser Ultra formats have been expanded to multiple locations. The latter will come to Chesterfield in May 2026, after the Waterford location saw the format arrive a month earlier, co-existing with ScreenX. This will make the Adrian and Warren (named “MJR Universal Cinema”) locations to not have a premium large format out of all MJR’s ten theaters, seven of which have the Laser Ultra format.
