= Hamady =

American supermarket chain

- Type: Partnership
- Industry: Retail
- Founded: Flint, Michigan, 1911
- Founder: Michael and Kamol Hamady
- Defunct: 1991 (1st)
- Fate: (bankruptcy) revived
- Headquarters: Flint, Michigan, United States
- Area served: Flint, Michigan area
- Key people: Justin Campau, Ramsay Sadek (CEO, managing partners)
- Products: Groceries
- Owner: Justin Campau; Ramsay Sadek

Hamady Bros. Food Markets, Inc., commonly known as Hamady, was an American supermarket chain based in Flint, Michigan, United States, which at its peak had 37 stores and 1,300 employees. Given the chain's pervasiveness in the area, paper grocery bags were known as “Hamady sacks”.

== History ==
Hamady Brothers was founded in 1911 by Michael and Kamol Hamady, who were immigrant cousins from Lebanon and referred to themselves as brothers. The first store was opened on East Dayton Street and Industrial Avenue in Flint.

Michael Hamady was the first CEO and was followed by his son Robert in 1954, his grand-nephew Jack in 1967, and by his grandson Robert Lee in 1969. Robert Lee restructured the company and sold it in 1974 to Alex Dandy.

The chain expanded through Michigan in 1980 by purchasing 21 closed Kroger stores, primarily on the west side of the state. In July and September 1985, Hamady bought two Hutch's supermarkets in Owosso, Michigan and in October bought Vescio's five stores in Saginaw County. The two acquisitions, which would be rebranded as Hamady stores, bringing the chain's store total to 30. As a result, an existing Hamady in Owosso was converted to a discount store called Price Rite. Price Rite was run by a division of Durant Enterprises, Dandy's parent corporation.

Al Kessel formed a union breaking contract with Kroger and hired all non-union employees at vastly reduced wages. Still a union company, Hamady was unable to compete with the newly formed "Kessel" Kroger stores. In order to stay in business, Hamady asked their union employees to take concessions, citing that if they did not, the company would eventually have to close. The Union chose to strike in November 1987. Workers from other unions, including the UAW stood on the picket lines with Hamady employees and successfully closed the last union grocery company in Genesee County.

The strike lasted seven weeks until January 1988, causing Hamady to lose the holiday sales. Hamady had previously declared bankruptcy in November 1987 due to the lost revenue during the strike. Dandy's company also acquired Chatham, which was liquidated due to the strike. Due to the strike and subsequent bankruptcy, former Kroger locations, along with some former Vescio locations in Saginaw, Michigan, had closed. In March 1989, a reorganization plan by M&B Distribution board chairman James McColgan Sr. for Hamady Bros. was approved by Federal bankruptcy Judge Arthur J. Spector. McColgan Investment Co., a M&B subsidiary, purchased 21 Hamady Bros. supermarkets for about $17.9 million, to which Dandy objected.

By May 1989, Dandy had approved the sale of Hamady assets to McColgan Investment. McColgan became chairman and chief operating officer. Under the new management, the UFCW accepted concessions in their contract. A loss of sales during the "Desert Storm" military offensive in Iraq, caused the chain to close the last of its 26 stores in 1991. 13 locations were sold to Kessel Food Markets, which was founded in 1981 by former Hamady vice president Al Kessel.

Jim McColgan Jr. announced the opening of a Hamady Complete Food Center in a former Kroger location in August 2017 in Flint. The store permanently liquidated after failure to meet financial objectives after just three months.
