= Muskegon Mall =

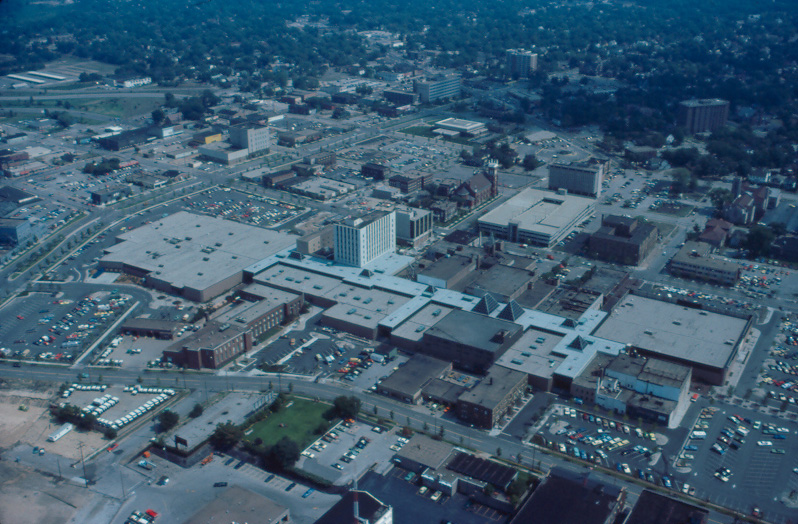
- Aerial view of Muskegon Mall, c. 1976
- Location: Muskegon, Michigan, United States
- Coordinates: 43°14′11.99″N 86°15′4.22″W
- Address: 100 Muskegon Mall
- Opened: March 27, 1976
- Closed: December 2001 (demolished November 2003)
- Developer: Economic Development Corp.
- Architect: Landman/Andrews
- Num. of stores: 60
- Num. of anchor tenants: 3
- Floor area: 500,000 sq ft (46,000 m^{2})
- Floors: 2 to 3 depending on the building. Considering the Muskegon Mall was essentially a roof over top of an existing downtown area. Several of the stores were actually multi-level old department stores. At one time there was a glass elevator and an escalator in the downtown Muskegon shopping mall.

Muskegon Mall was an enclosed shopping mall in downtown Muskegon, Michigan. Opened in 1976, it closed in 2001 and was torn down for redevelopment.

== History ==
Muskegon Mall construction began in 1974, and the mall opened for business on March 27, 1976. Created by enclosing three blocks of Western Avenue and building a department store at each end - Sears at one end, and Grand Rapids-based Steketee's at the other - the mall also resulted in the closure of parts of First, Second, and Jefferson streets. Incorporated as a third anchor, an existing store, Hardy's, had been in operation since 1881, and its store was partnered with Herpolsheimer's after being rebuilt in 1946.

It was the most popular shopping center in Muskegon County by 1989, despite the Hardy's-Herpolsheimer's store closing the same year. By 1992, the mall was sold to Harold Back and Richard Perlman. The mall continued to lose tenants throughout the 1990s, when retail stores were built along Sternberg Road at US Highway 31 southeast of town.

When The Lakes Mall opened in that area in 2001, Sears relocated there from Muskegon Mall, and Steketee's closed. Muskegon Mall closed in December 2001 and demolition began on the structure in November 2003. The site was used for redevelopment, such as the reopening of Western Avenue to traffic and the construction of new buildings on the former mall site.
