= Courtland Center =

Shopping mall in Burton, Michigan, United States

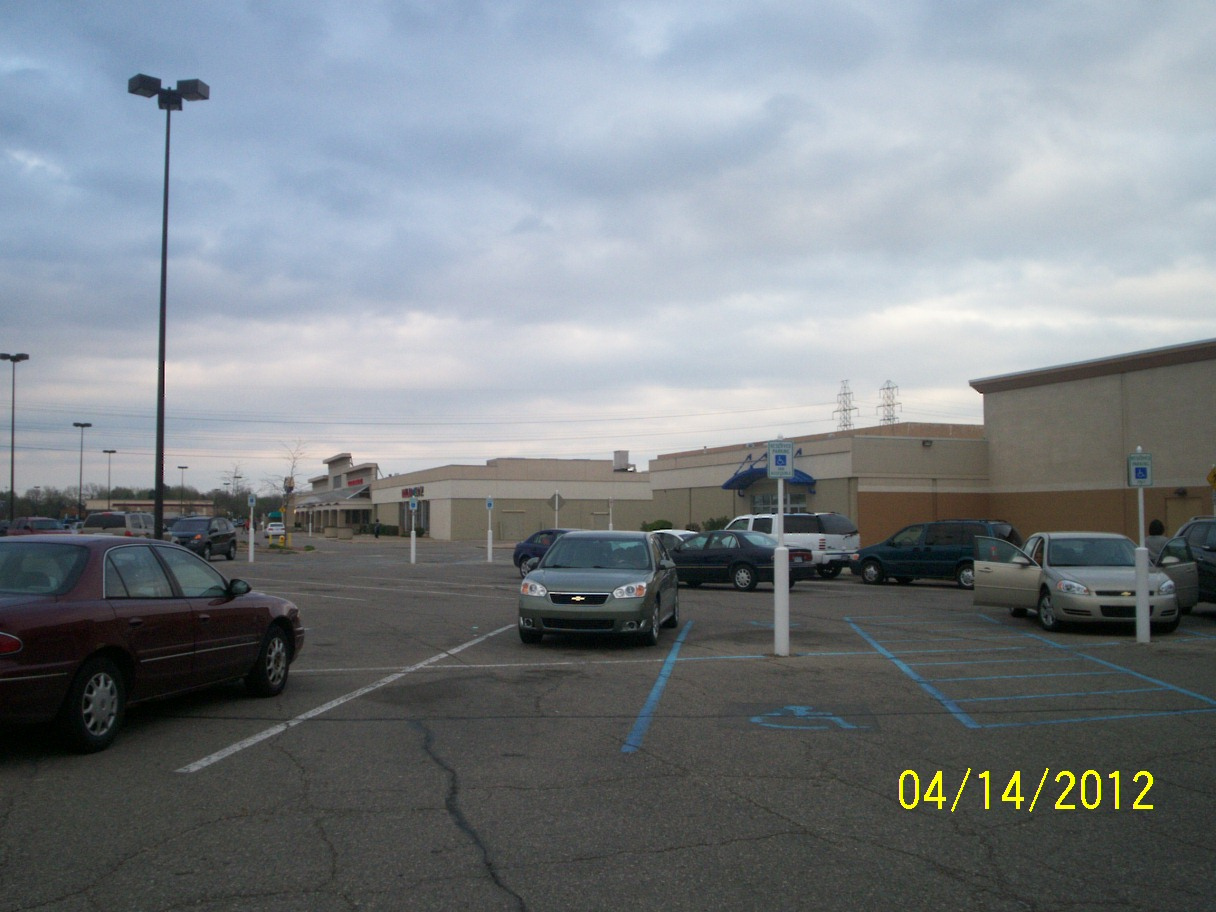
- North side of Courtland Center
- Location: Burton, Michigan, United States
- Coordinates: 43.017°N 83.631°W
- Address: 4190 East Court Street
- Opened: 1968
- Developer: Forest City Enterprises
- Owner: Stockbridge Courtland Center, LLC
- Num. of stores: 60
- Num. of anchor tenants: 5
- Floor area: 460,000 square feet (43,000 m^{2})
- Floors: 1
- Public transit: MTA
- Website: courtlandcenter.com

Courtland Center is an enclosed regional shopping mall in Burton, Michigan, United States. Opened in 1968, it is currently anchored by JCPenney, Dunham's Sports, and Ross.

== History ==
In September 1964, the Burton Township board rezoned the property at the southeastern corner of East Court Street and Center Road from single family residential to commercial. Forest City Enterprises began building on the property after the rezoning on the Court Mall Center with expectations for a second quarter 1965 opening.

=== Eastland Mall ===
Courtland Center opened in late October 1968 as Eastland Mall, in what was then Burton Township, under the ownership of Forest City and Jack Shifron. Its opening predated the larger Genesee Valley Center, on the other side of Flint, by two years. At the time, it featured it had a 1000-seat theater and 47 stores including three anchor stores: discount chain Woolco on the eastern end, The Fair on the western end and Detroit, Michigan-based Federal's in the center. Federal's later closed and briefly became Robert Hall Village until 1977, when it closed due to bankruptcy. The space was later occupied by JCPenney. In 1983, Woolco shuttered all of their U.S. locations.

The mall theater opened with one screen in 1967 as Eastland Mall Theatre. Under Redstone Management, the theater added another screen in December 1983.

=== Courtland Center ===
In August 1986, the mall was renamed Courtland Center. In 1987, The Fair closed and became Mervyn's. The former Woolco space was subdivided and occupied by Crowley's department store and additional stores. The mall had 80 stores in 1994. Crowley's closed in 1997, and the theaters added an expansion in November 1998 under the management of National Amusements.

In 1991, the cinemas were closed by National Amusements (NA). In 1998, the location was reopened by and as Silver Cinemas with six screens. NA purchased Silver's business soon thereafter and was renamed back to Courtland Center Cinema. The theaters added an expansion in November 1998 under the management of National Amusements.

=== 2000s redevelopment ===
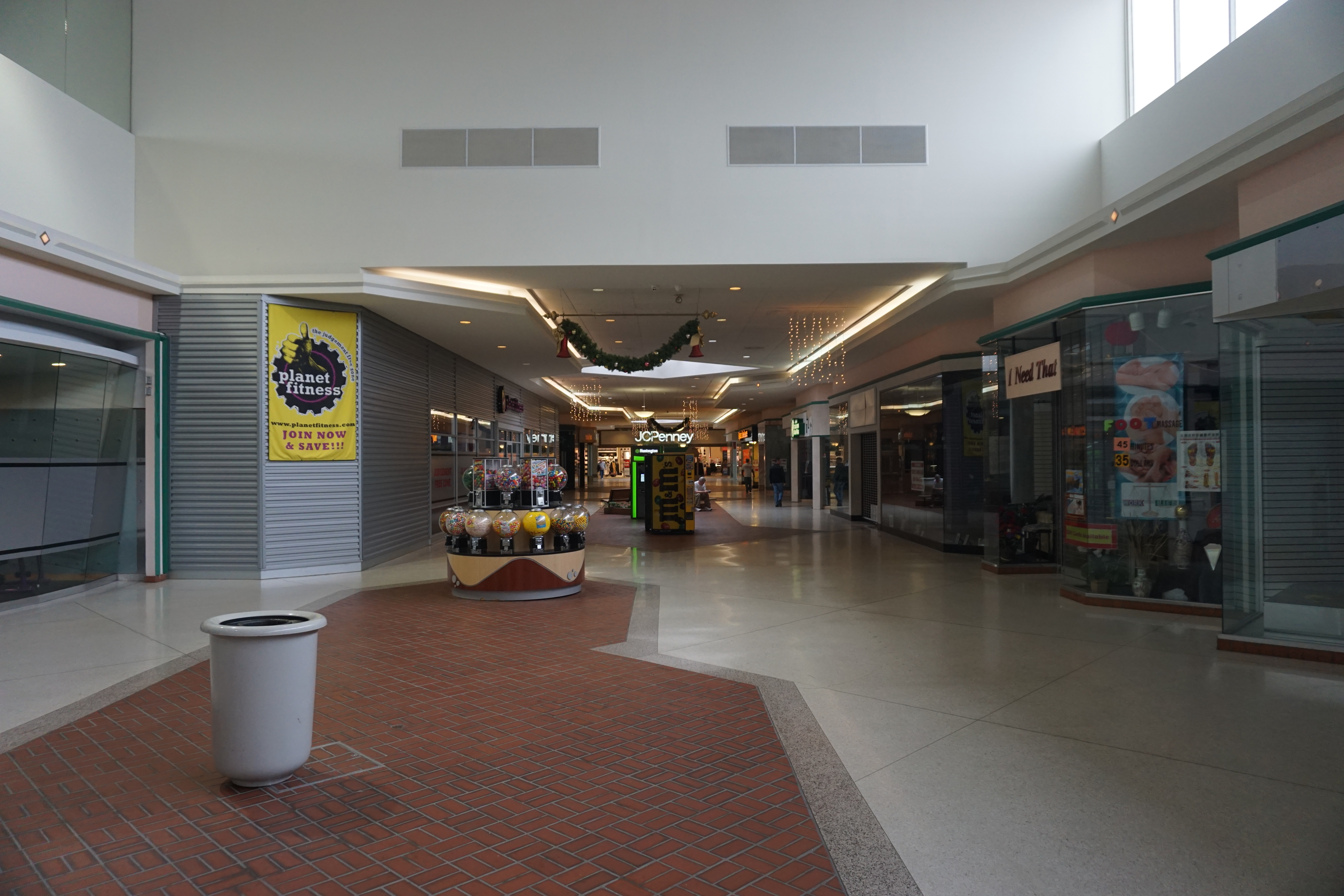
Interior of Courtland Center in 2018

Tucker Development acquired the mall from Forest City Enterprises in the early 2004 and began renovations on it. The far end of the former Crowley's was converted to Old Navy in July 2000. They relocated inside the mall in 2005, displacing a former f.y.e. which had closed, and a Payless ShoeSource which was relocated. Later that same year, Staples moved from a nearby strip mall into Old Navy's former location, while the remainder of the former Crowley's was split between a new Jo-Ann Etc. store (resulting in the closure of the existing Jo-Ann Fabrics store) and Dunham's Sports, which had also moved from a nearby strip mall.

Mervyns closed in early 2006 when the chain exited Michigan. In late 2007, JCPenney announced that it would relocate its existing stores in the mall to a newer, larger location in the former Mervyns space. While the former Mervyns space was being redeveloped and expanded, the roof of the store caught on fire, causing the mall to close for a day in September 2007. Old Navy closed its store at the mall in January 2008, and JCPenney's new store opened on March 1, 2008, resulting in the closure of the three former JCPenney stores. The new location included several departments which were not present in the former locations, such as an inline Sephora store. JCPenney's former main store in the middle of the mall was replaced by Steve & Barry's, which opened on May 15, 2008, while the two sub-stores were vacated. Steve & Barry's closed December 2008, and the theaters re-closed in 2009. Planet Fitness replaced the Old Navy space in February 2011.

On May 20, 2011, the cinema was reopened by NCG Cinemas as NCG Courtland Cinemas to replace NCG's Clio location. In 2013, the mall was sold by Tucker Development to a limited liability company from Delaware.

Goodwill Industries of Mid-Michigan operated a holiday-themed pop-up store in the mall from November to December 2015. Later, in January 2016, Goodwill opened a 15,000-square foot, full-sized store in the mall, replacing an existing store in Burton.

In 2018, the Sloan Museum temporarily moved to the former Steve & Barry's space in the mall, while its permanent building was under renovation. The temporary museum closed in May 2022, ahead of the permanent museum's reopening the following month.

NGC Courtland Cinemas closed permanently on September 27, 2021.

Staples closed in June 2023, and was replaced by Ross in March 2024. Jo-Ann closed during the chain's liquidation in April 2025.
