= Modern Skate & Surf =

Modern Skate and Surf was founded in 1979 by George Leichtweis. The retailer, eventually grew to 5 brick and mortar and two indoor skate park locations in Michigan as well as an online shop at www.modernskate.com which specializes in equipment and accessories for snowboarding, skateboarding, inline skating, rollerskating, and scootering. Modern Skate currently has one World Class Indoor Skate Park in Royal Oak, Michigan. The second largest indoor skate park in the United States is so large that it is two cities, both Royal Oak and Madison Heights.

== History ==
Since opening its first store in Royal Oak, MI in 1979, Modern Skate and Surf has been a pioneer in the alternative sports market. Modern skate was one of the first three inline skate shops in the world, along with being the first snowboard and wakeboard shop in Michigan. Additionally, Modern is still one of the longest-standing skateboard shops in the state. The company currently maintains retail locations in Royal Oak, MI.

== Skate parks ==
In 1999, Modern Skate and Surf opened their first skate park in Ferndale, Michigan. Although this location has since closed, Modern Skate still has one skate park in Royal Oak. Grand Rapids, MI also had a long-standing Modern Skatepark, but was closed in 2011. The Royal Oak park, completed in 2008, features over 1-acre (4,000 m^{2}) of ramps and rails, including a wooden bowl made by world-renowned builders Team Pain. In addition to these two skate parks, Modern Skate was one of the main driving forces behind the fund-raising for Ranney Skate Park in Lansing, MI.
