= Farmer Jack =

Supermarket in Michigan. U.S.

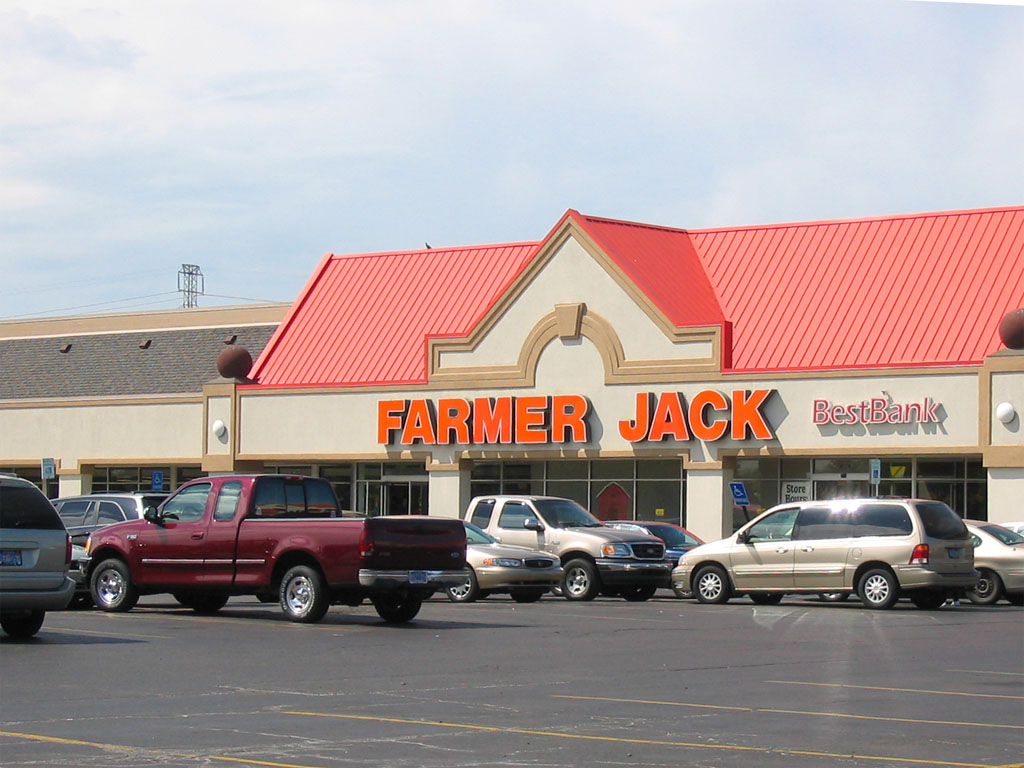
- Farmer Jack store in Taylor, Michigan, in 2006
- Formerly: Tom's Quality Meats (1924–1945); Lucky Stores (1945–1955); Food Fair (1945–1955); Borman Food Stores Inc. (1955–1959) Traded as Food Fair; Borman's Inc. (1959–1987)
- Type: Subsidiary
- Industry: Retail (Grocery)
- Founded: 1924 (102 years ago) in Detroit, Michigan, U.S.
- Founders: Tom Borman and Sam Burlak
- Defunct: July 7, 2007; 19 years ago
- Fate: Acquisition by A&P, then liquidation
- Headquarters: Detroit, Michigan, U.S.
- Number of locations: 100 at peak (1995); 67 at liquidation (2007)
- Areas served: Michigan
- Products: Bakery, dairy, deli, frozen foods, general grocery, meat, produce, seafood, snacks, liquor
- Brands: Various
- Revenue: ▼US$98 million (1997)
- Number of employees: 7,200 (1997)
- Parent: The Great Atlantic & Pacific Tea Company (1987-2007)

Farmer Jack was a supermarket chain based in Detroit, Michigan. At its peak, it operated more than 100 stores, primarily in metropolitan Detroit. There was a store in Evart, MI in the late 70s/early 80s. In its final years, the chain operated as the Midwest subsidiary of the New Jersey–based A&P Corporation. A&P closed the Farmer Jack chain on July 7, 2007.

Farmer Jack stores were typically in suburban neighborhoods, usually anchoring strip malls. In addition to offering groceries, each store operated full-service produce, floral, delicatessen, bakery, pharmacy, meat, and seafood departments, with some locations including a bank.

== History ==
Farmer Jack's beginnings were in 1924, when Jewish-Russian immigrants Tom Borman and Sam Burlak opened a neighborhood grocery store, Tom's Quality Meats, at 12th and Forest in Detroit. In 1927, his brother Abraham "Al" Borman opened a store on Kercheval on the city's east side. The brothers eventually formed a partnership, which ended in 1945, with Tom developing Lucky Stores, and Al developing Food Fair markets. In 1955, the two operations merged into Food Fair, operating under the corporate entity Borman Food Stores Inc. Four years later, the renamed Borman's Inc., sold more than 400,000 shares of stock, with the brothers retaining control. Proceeds from the stock sale fueled a buying binge: Borman's bought State Super Markets of Ferndale; American Stores Inc., acquired nine Lipson-Gourwitz Co. markets in Detroit, planning an expansion to 46 stores.

In 1966, Borman announced the opening of three suburban shopping centers that would contain gas stations, car washes, garden supply stores, Yankee discount stores, and food stores, operating under the new moniker of Farmer Jack. By 1972, Detroit became a major zone of grocery store competition, with six chains competing in the region, including Chatham and Great Scott! In a speech, Paul Borman claimed A&P's move to discount-type stores had nearly destroyed the supermarket industry.

Borman acquired the 13-store Arnold Drug pharmacy chain in 1965, but dissolved this division in 1981 in order to cut financial losses.

In 1987, Borman's was flush with cash, and took advantage of Safeway's troubles as an opportunity to diversify its store base beyond Michigan when it bought that chain's 60-store Salt Lake City division. Those stores were throughout Utah, southern Idaho, and in adjacent towns in Nevada, Eastern Oregon, and Wyoming. The Safeway stores were renamed Farmer Jack; the company planned to remodel and update them, as Safeway had not invested much in the division. The expansion was short-lived and by the end of 1988, Farmer Jack sold the 60-store division to various retailers including 29 stores to Boise, Idaho-based retailer Albertsons. Later in 1987, a lengthy strike by Detroit-area clerks and cashiers, who were not supported by meat cutters or Teamsters, depleted Borman's cash reserve and forced the company to buy out 800 workers at the cost of $12.9 million ($30.5 million in 2024). The 1987 strike started a period of losses that would prompt the sale to A&P.

In 1989, beginning a decade of merger mania in the supermarket business, A&P paid $76 million ($167 million in 2024) for 79 Farmer Jack stores operated by Borman's. The buyout made A&P the top player among grocery stores in southeastern Michigan, with a 36% share. By 1994, all A&P stores in metro Detroit had been converted to Farmer Jack stores.

In the mid-1990s, A&P rebranded select stores within the East (mostly in Virginia and South Carolina) to the Farmer Jack banner; while they shared the same name, these stores were not controlled by the Midwest division. These stores were closed or sold by 1999.

In September 2003, a newly built Farmer Jack opened in Milford, Michigan; a new store opened in Waterford, Michigan, in 2005. The company planned a new store for Dearborn Heights in 2004, but it opened as Food Basics instead. After A&P discontinued the Food Basics brand locally, the company converted it into a Farmer Jack.

== Decline and demise ==
After initial merger pains, Farmer Jack rose to prosperity, becoming A&P's most profitable division through the 1990s. But in 2002, the chain began losing money. Former executives attributed this to several reasons:

- The decision to expand the chain beyond metro Detroit; stores in the Toledo, Flint, Saginaw and Lansing markets were unsuccessful and proved to be a major financial drain.
- The lack of capital improvements within its existing stores. In 2001, Kroger committed to a five-year, $345M initiative to remodel or replace its existing metro Detroit stores. In 2002 to 2003, Farmer Jack committed just $50M. Analysts blamed the discrepancy on A&P's financial woes and its need to conserve cash.
- A delayed response to the price war launched between Meijer, Kroger, Costco and Super K-Mart.
- The discontinuation of awarding Northwest Airlines mileage for purchases in late 2001, which alienated many of its affluent consumers.
- A&P's decision to lay off most local executive management, merchandising operations, accounting, advertising and marketing positions, consolidating and performing these operations from its Montvale headquarters instead. "You really, truly need someone in the organization who knows the market, who knows the customer, [but there was] nobody left," a former executive told the Detroit Free Press. While A&P panned local management for accounting irregularities that affected the company, former executives blamed the breadth of the layoffs on the company's desire to cut costs.

Market Scope projected that Farmer Jack led metro Detroit in market share with 27.5% at year end 2001. It began a free fall in 2002; by the end of the year, Kroger led the market while Meijer climbed to 16.1% from 10.1% in just one year.

In 2003, Farmer Jack announced its first round of store closures and that it would seek voluntary buyouts among its most senior employees. In June, in a move made by the company to ‘get its consumer base back,’ but attributed by the media as a marketing gimmick, each store was closed for 37 hours so that they could be thoroughly cleaned; when the stores reopened, employees debuted with new uniforms and the loyalty card and weekly sales were discontinued in favor of everyday low pricing. Additionally, a new marketing program titled "We’re Thinking Fresh" promoting ‘it’s fresh or it’s free - guaranteed’ was launched. An analysis by the Detroit Free Press among a basket of commonly purchased items concluded that Farmer Jack's price had indeed gone from most expensive to least expensive among its peers; however, journalists also noted that "in spite of the surface shine, some areas of the store (where journalists shopped) needed a scrubbing. The coolers looked old, a frozen food area had bent and crooked shelves, and some inner cooler door frames were dusty and dotted with bits of paper." The paper speculated that competitors would match Farmer Jack's prices and it would suffer from the same problems it had before the makeover.

In early 2004, ten Farmer Jack locations were converted into A&P's Food Basics format in an attempt to compete with discount chains such as Save-A-Lot. Less than a year later, nine were closed while the other—a new-build store in Dearborn Heights—was converted into a Farmer Jack. Simultaneously, the closure of 15 Farmer Jacks was announced; four more closures were announced later in the year.

In early 2005, A&P placed Farmer Jack for sale, seeking an estimated $250M (~$385 million in 2024) for 71 core stores; the remaining locations were offered individually. Later that year, workers approved wage cuts conditional on a sale to Spartan Stores—which was led by several former Farmer Jack executives, including its CEO Dennis Edison who led Farmer Jack until his dismissal in 2002, but the deal fell through. Workers then approved a similar package of cuts in exchange for A&P guaranteeing to keep the stores open through May 2007. A&P, which was unable to find a buyer for Farmer Jack, said the chain would break even for the year and therefore A&P—which had just received a cash injection from the sale of its Canadian division—was in no hurry to sell it. A&P also admitted that because it had anticipated a quick sale, Farmer Jack had been poorly managed for over a year; therefore, the company was returning to loyalty cards and "It's Savings Time" marketing.

By April 2006, Farmer Jack was once again profitable.

In August 2006, Farmer Jack announced it would convert three stores into a prototype mixed discount-upscale market featuring warehouse-type shelving, fewer product offerings and higher stacking in the produce department while featuring lower prices. Plans were scrapped by October, with then A&P CEO Eric Claus saying "we're not pleased with our lack of sales momentum in Michigan".

In March 2007, A&P announced plans to sell or close Farmer Jack by July. In May, its distribution warehouses closed. The remaining Farmer Jacks closed on July 7. "For all practical purposes, those stores were closed anyway," supermarket analyst David Livingston told the Detroit News. "Farmer Jack was doing such a low volume. The existing stores were barely even doing that -- existing." "Farmer Jack was stuck in the past in terms of quality, merchandising and pricing," said Ken Dalto, a Farmington Hills-based retail consultant. "A&P never gave its Michigan stores the type of attention they needed to do well. Customers noticed they didn't move beyond 20 years ago." While Kroger was aggressively remodeling or rebuilding its stores with designer interiors, full service meat & seafood counters, sushi and extensive prepared food bars, most Farmer Jacks retained A&P's late 1980s/early 1990s interior design package.

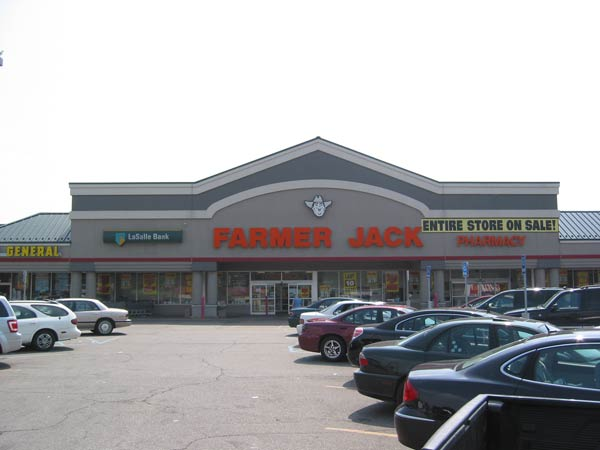
A Farmer Jack store with a liquidation sign displayed

Of the remaining 66 Farmer Jacks, the company announced that it sold 20 to Kroger, 10 to smaller local chains and 15 to independent grocers. However, some of the deals with the independent grocers collapsed. In an October 2007 SEC filing A&P revealed that it received approximately $110 million for 41 former Farmer Jack sites, and that 2 warehouses and 25 stores remained for sale.

In June 2010, A&P ended lease payments at vacant Farmer Jack stores; affected property owners responded with 24 lawsuits against A&P. In December 2010, A&P filed for bankruptcy citing dark leases from discontinued operations like Farmer Jack as a factor in its decision.

== Marketing ==
Farmer Jack is remembered in metro Detroit for its It's Always Savings Time jingle, which was used in the 1990s and again in the mid-2000s. Its most famous advertising mode was the 10-second "Farmer Jack savings time" plugs where the radio personality would give a quick special while in the background would play a sound similar to a teletype that began and ended with a low "boinnng" sound.

Another famous slogan was Made in Michigan, Sold at Farmer Jack, which was used to promote Michigan brands and agriculture products.

In 2018, the jingle was satirized in the Detroiters episode "Farmer Zack".
