= The Lakes Mall =

Shopping mall near Muskegon, Michigan

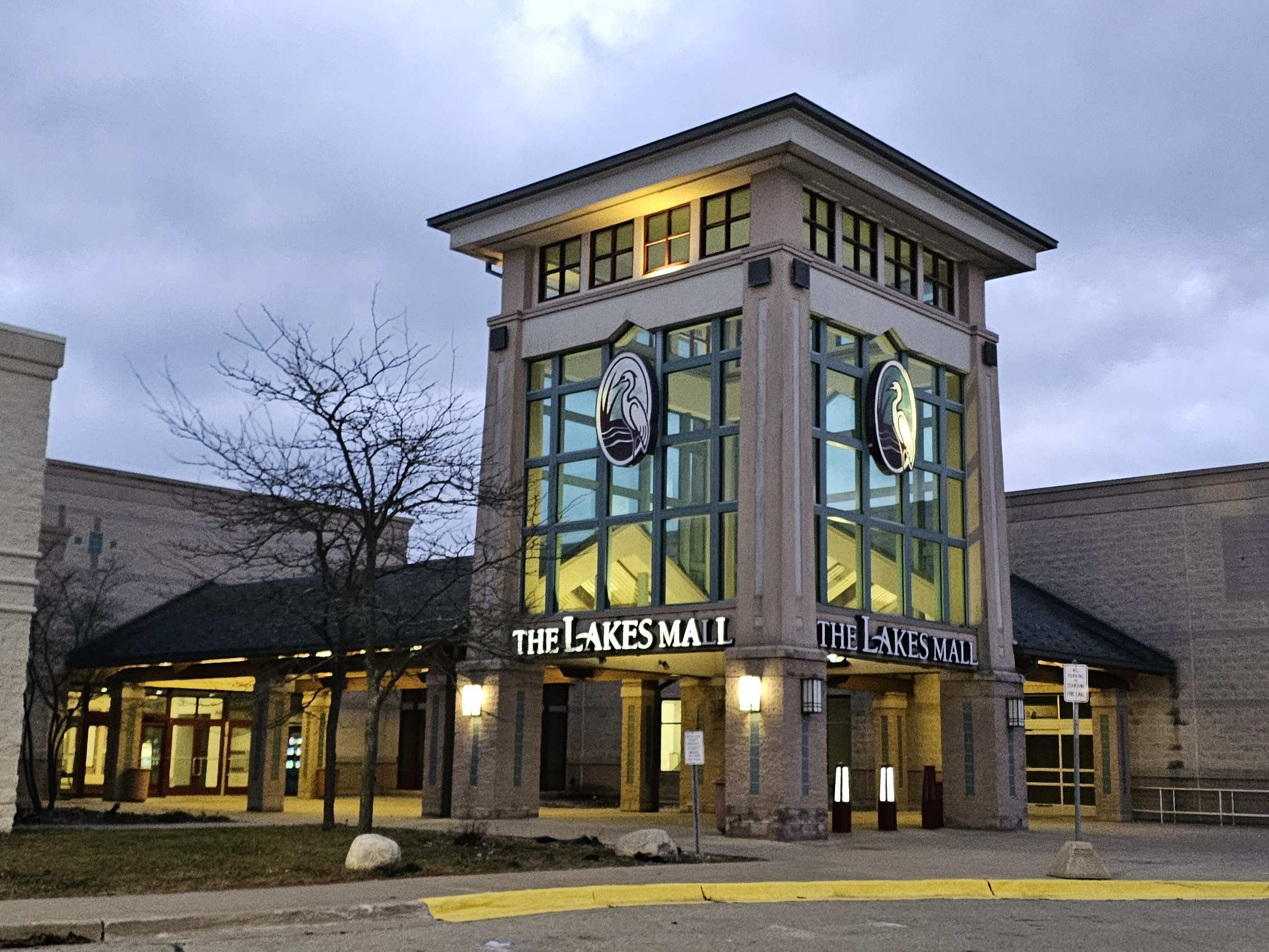
- The mall in December 2023
- Location: Fruitport Township, Michigan, United States
- Coordinates: 43.150464°N 86.202209°W
- Opened: August 15, 2001; 25 years ago
- Developer: CBL & Associates Properties
- Manager: Namdar Realty Group
- Owner: Namdar Realty Group
- Num. of stores: 100+
- Num. of anchor tenants: 6 (5 open, 1 vacant)
- Floor area: 645,677 square feet (59,985.4 m^{2})
- Floors: 1
- Public transit: Muskegon Area Transit System
- Website: thelakesmall.com

The Lakes Mall is an enclosed shopping mall serving the city of Muskegon, Michigan, United States. It is located in Fruitport Township, with a Muskegon mailing address. Opened in 2001, the mall features more than sixty retailers, plus a food court, in 645,677 square feet (59,985.4 m^{2}) of gross leasable area. Anchor stores are Dick's Sporting Goods, Family Farm & Home, JCPenney, Lange's Comics, and Soar N Bounce with one vacant anchor store last occupied by Sears.

== History ==
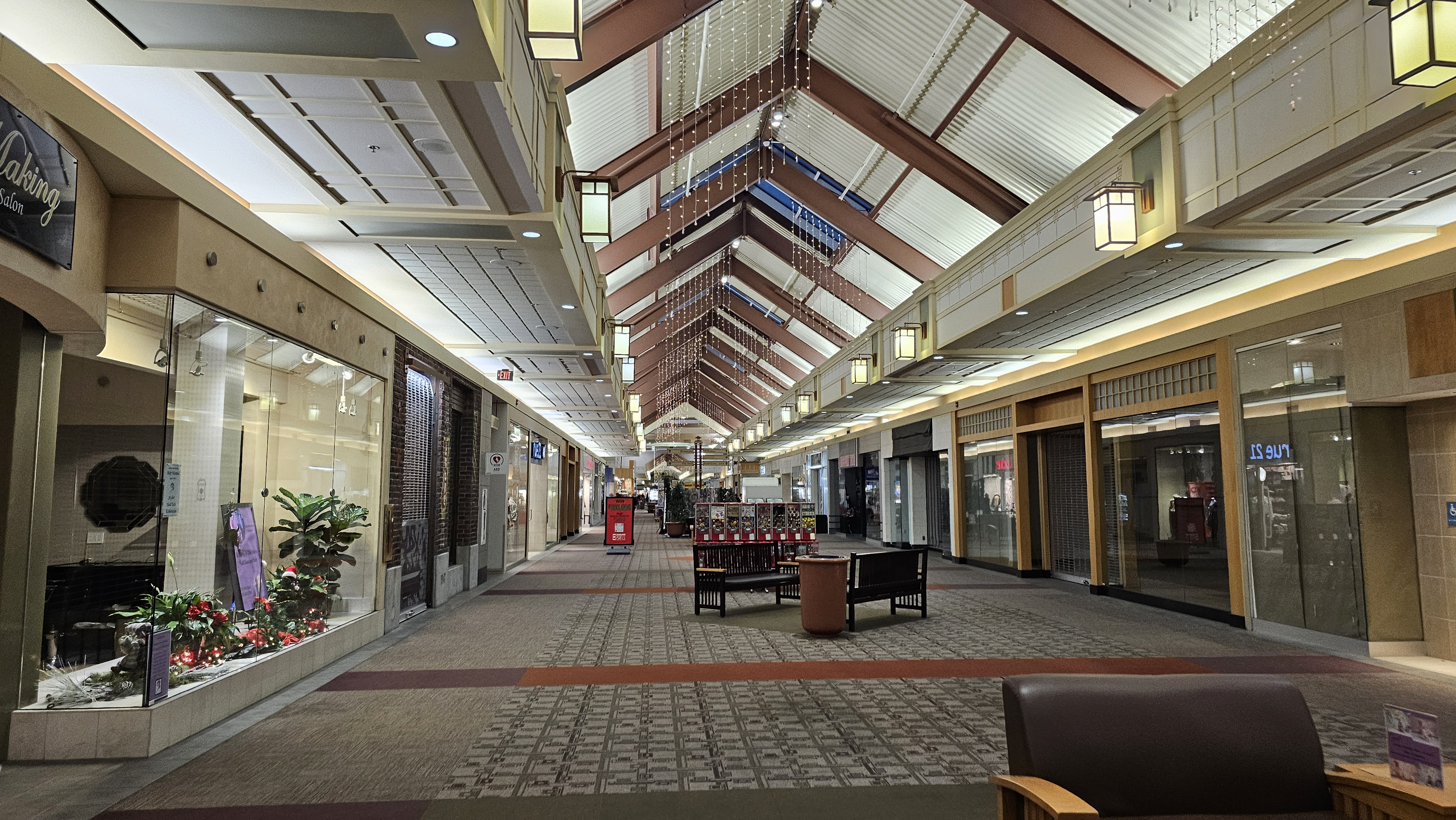
Interior of the mall, December 2023

The Lakes Mall was developed by CBL & Associates Properties of Chattanooga, Tennessee, on a site south of town, near the junction of Interstate 96 and U.S. Highway 31, at the southeastern corner of Sternberg Road and Harvey Street. Construction began on the property in late 1999. On August 15, 2001, the mall's grand opening was announced, although Sears had been operational since March of that year. The mall, upon opening, featured Bed Bath & Beyond, JCPenney, Sears and Younkers among its anchor stores. JCPenney had relocated from a standalone store, while Sears had relocated from the former Muskegon Mall downtown. Dick's Sporting Goods was added in late 2004.

On April 18, 2018, it was announced that Younkers would be closing as parent company The Bon-Ton is going out of business. The store closed in August 2018. On December 28, 2018, it was announced that Sears would be closing as part of a plan to close 80 stores nationwide. The store closed on March 14, 2019. Bed Bath & Beyond closed in 2023. In March 2024, Family Farm & Home opened in 1/3 of the former Younkers space. On March 1, 2025, Lange's Comics opened in the former Bed Bath & Beyond space making it an official anchor. On December 6, 2025, Soar N Bounce opened in the remaining 2/3 of the former Younkers.

== Impact on the community ==
Prior to the development of the mall, the only major business that operated at the intersection of Sternberg Road and Harvey Street was a strip mall known as the Lakeshore Marketplace. This center, a former outlet mall, was eventually redeveloped into big box space (including Toys "R" Us (which later became Sierra), Barnes & Noble, Old Navy, TJ Maxx, and Target. Several restaurants soon opened along The Lakes Mall's periphery.

Muskegon Mall, an older mall created by enclosing several blocks of Muskegon's downtown, had operated in downtown Muskegon since 1976. However, it was not considered a major retail draw for the Muskegon area, because it lacked the major chain stores present at the malls in Grand Rapids. Since its opening in 2001, The Lakes Mall has been cited as the most popular retail destination in the Muskegon area.
