= Emagine Entertainment =

American movie theater chain

Emagine Entertainment, Inc.

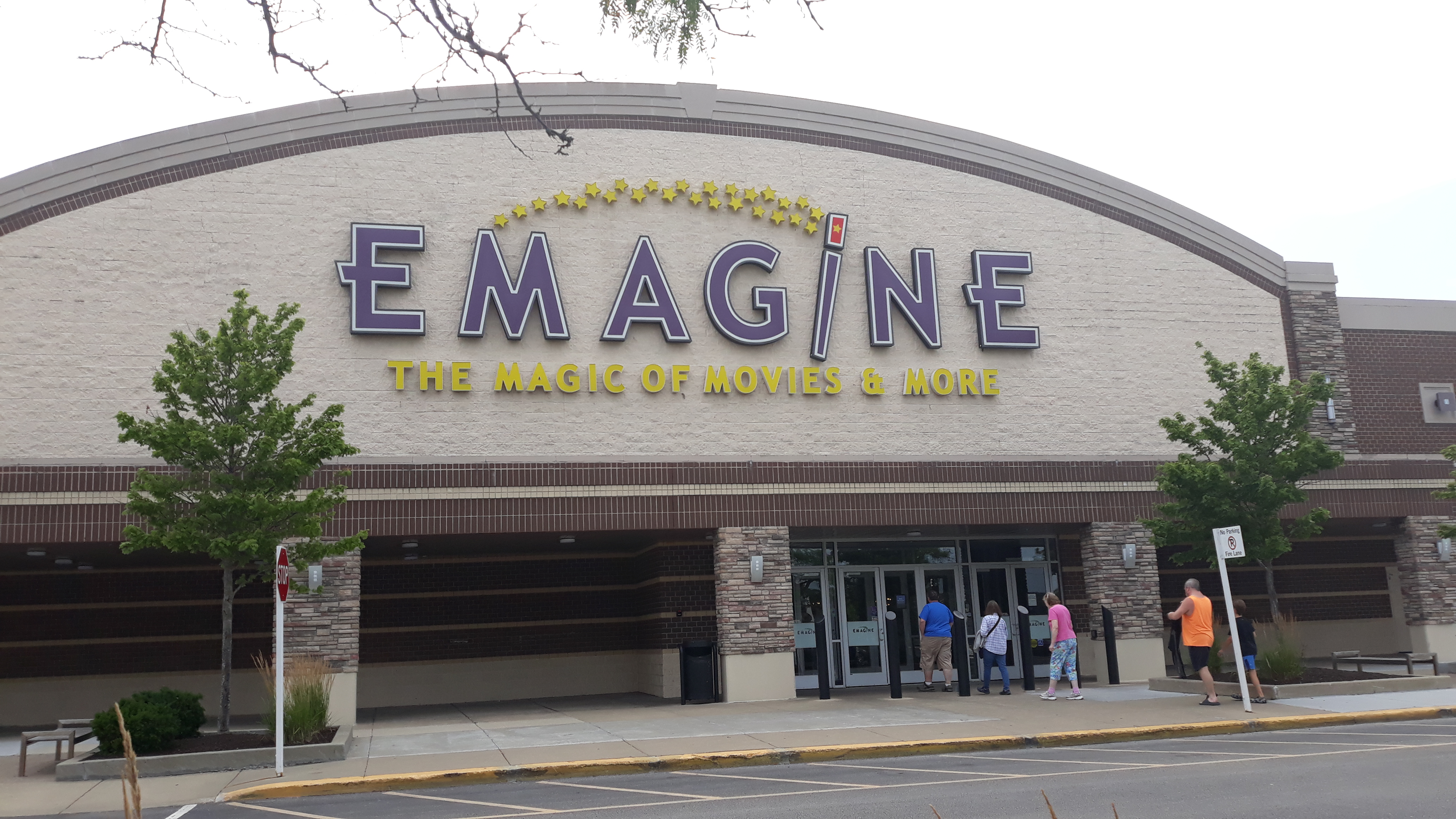
- An Emagine theater in Frankfort, Illinois
- Company type: Subsidiary
- Industry: Entertainment (movie theaters)
- Founded: 1997; 29 years ago in Birch Run, Michigan, U.S.
- Founder: Paul Glantz
- Headquarters: Troy, Michigan, U.S.
- Number of locations: 28
- Key people: Paul Glantz (Chairman & CEO); Trevor Baker (COO); Dirk Kjolhede (CFO); Chris Becker (CFO)
- Revenue: US$91.9 million (2023)
- Number of employees: 1,500 (2023)
- Parent: Kinepolis
- Website: www.emagine-entertainment.com

Emagine Entertainment Inc. is an American movie theater chain based in Troy, Michigan. Owned by Kinepolis Group, it owns 14 locations and franchises 14 additional locations, located in Michigan, Illinois, Indiana, Minnesota, Wisconsin, and Colorado. Prior to its acquisition by Kinepolis, Emagine was ranked as the 9th largest theatre chain in North America.

== History ==
The company began in 1997 and it was first known as Cinema Hollywood (now known as Emagine Birch Run) where they branched off to be known as Emagine Entertainment.

In 2016, Emagine expanded into Minnesota, acquiring Muller Family Theatres, with eight locations in the Twin Cities metro area. Six of Muller's theaters were renovated and rebranded as Emagine in 2016, followed by the Rogers and Monticello locations a year later. Emagine opened a ninth Minnesota location in Eagan in 2019.

Emagine expanded into Illinois with a location in Frankfort in late 2016. Two years later in 2018, the chain expanded into Wisconsin, opening a theater near Lake Geneva on August 28.

In 2021, Emagine purchased four former Goodrich Quality Theaters in Kochville Township, Michigan; Batavia, Illinois; Portage, Indiana; and Noblesville, Indiana.

Emagine opened their first sports lounge in their Royal Oak, Michigan location in December 2021, with free admission and WiFi access for online gambling.

=== Monroe Street Drive-In Powered by Emagine ===
Expanding its offerings beyond the cineplex, Emagine Entertainment, partnering with Bedrock, opened a drive-in experience for metro Detroiters starting in January 2021. Called the Monroe Street Drive-In Powered by Emagine, and located in downtown Detroit (near Campus Martius), the venue offered movies from Thursday to Sunday nights. Described as a “temporary drive-in experience,” it featured a 60x32 ft digital projection screen and parking for up to 65 cars. The venue was officially discontinued after two winters in 2021 and was subsequently replaced by the Monroe Street Midway, an activated space that included roller skating, basketball, live music, and other family-friendly activities.

=== Acquisition by Kinepolis ===
In November 2025, Belgian cinema operator Kinepolis announced that it would acquire Emagine for $105 million; the deal would give Kinepolis control of its 14 corporately-owned locations, and add to its presence in Michigan after its prior acquisition of MJR Theatres' 10 locations.

== See also ==
- Movie theater
