= Genesee Valley Center =

Shopping mall in Flint Township, Michigan, United States

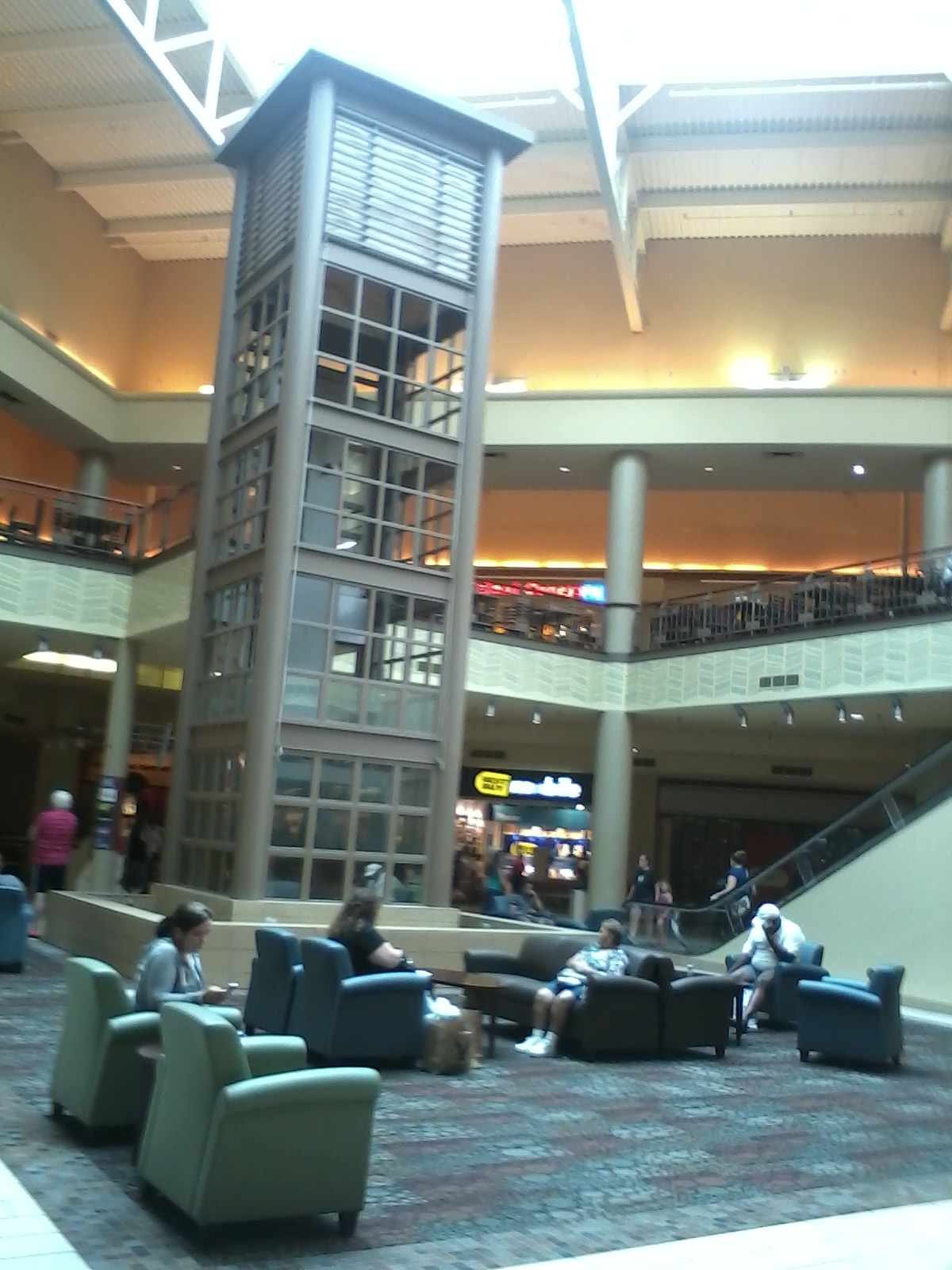
- The center court of Genesee Valley Center in 2014
- Location: Flint Township, Michigan, United States
- Coordinates: 42.9808°N 83.7689°W
- Address: 3341 South Linden Road
- Opened: 1970
- Developer: Shopping Centers, Inc.
- Manager: Namdar Realty Group
- Owner: Namdar Realty Group
- Architect: Victor Gruen
- Num. of stores: approx. 15+
- Num. of anchor tenants: 4 (1 open, 3 vacant)
- Floor area: 1,272,397 square feet (118,209.5 m^{2})
- Floors: 1 plus mezzanine (2 in anchors)
- Public transit: MTA
- Website: geneseemall.com

Genesee Valley Center is an enclosed regional shopping mall in Flint Township, Michigan, just outside the city of Flint, Michigan, United States. Opening in 1970, the mall was developed by Detroit-based department store chain Hudson's, which served as one of the two original anchor stores along with Sears. Expansions throughout the mall's history added JCPenney, Mervyn's, and Montgomery Ward, as well as a food court. Hudson's was sold to Marshall Field's in 2001, which itself was sold to Macy's five years later. Montgomery Ward closed in 2001 and was demolished for an outdoor concourse featuring a Barnes & Noble, while Mervyn's was later converted to Burlington. Following the closures of both Burlington and Sears in 2018, the mall began a period of decline which led to multiple store closures. Macy's closed in 2025, leaving JCPenney as the sole anchor store. The mall is owned and managed by Namdar Realty Group.

== History ==
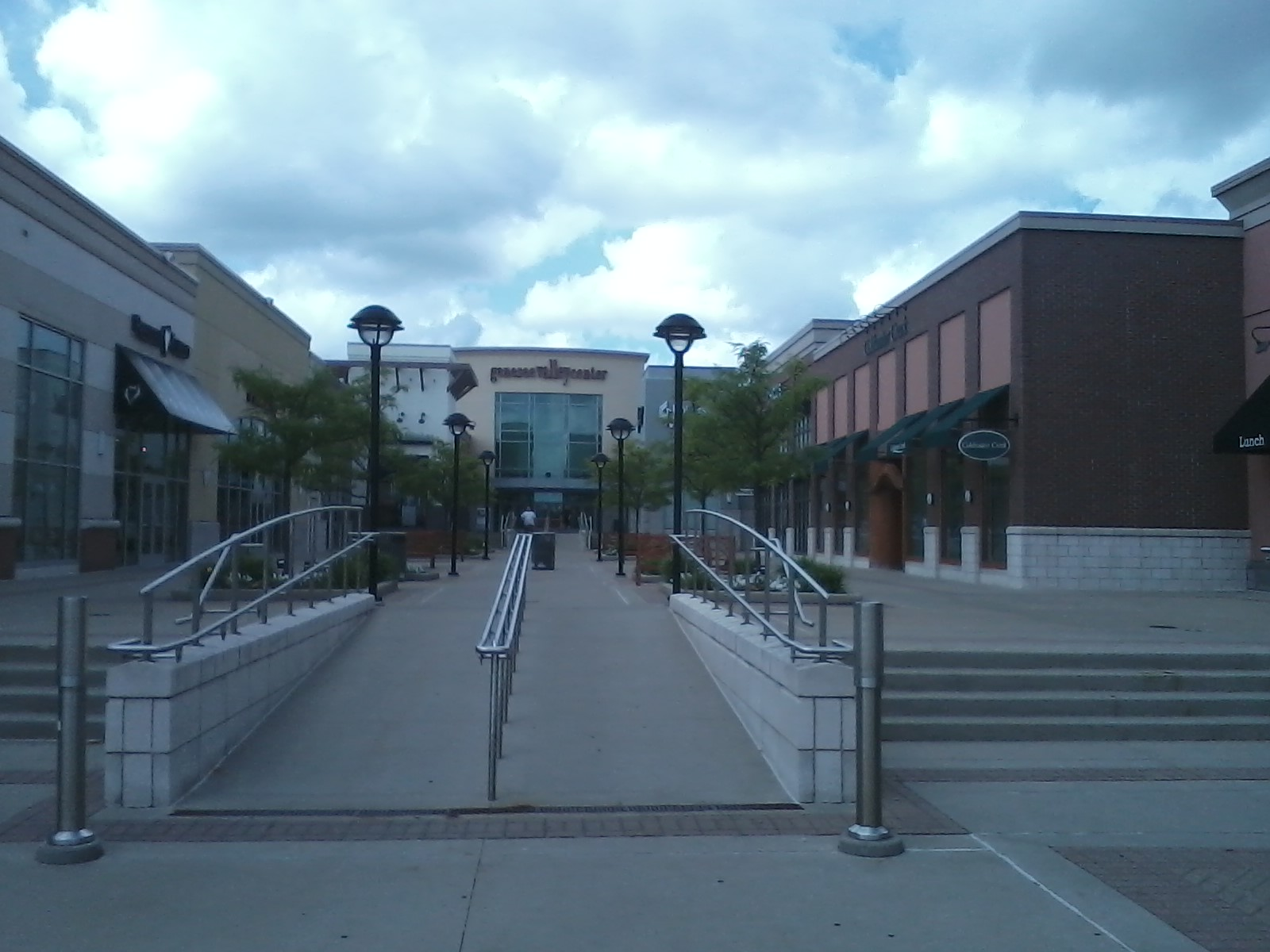
The outdoor section in 2014.

Shopping Centers, Inc. of Southfield, Michigan, a retail division of Detroit, Michigan-based Hudson's department stores, first announced plans for Genesee Valley Center in 1968. These plans coincided with one of the firm's other malls under development at the time, Southland Center in the Detroit suburb of Taylor. Hudson's would serve as the southern anchor store of Genesee Valley Center, with Sears as the complex's other anchor, in between an enclosed shopping mall comprising approximately 50 stores. Victor Gruen served as Genesee Valley Center's architect.

Sears was the first store to open, doing so in May 1970. Hudson's followed two months later, with this location being the chain's largest store outside of Detroit. On August 8, 1970, Genesee Valley Center opened to the public. At the time, it comprised fifty-six tenants, including a Hamady Brothers supermarket and Cunningham Drug. By September, a Woolworth dime store had opened next to Sears.

In 1979, an eastern wing anchored by JCPenney was added to the mall. A mezzanine level with a food court was added in 1987. The Cunningham Drug Store was demolished for a wing featuring a Mervyn's in 1993, Montgomery Ward was also added. These additions brought the mall to 1,300,000 square feet (120,000 m^{2}) of gross leasable area, making it the largest mall in Michigan north of Detroit. Woolworth was briefly downsized to a cosmetics-oriented prototype called Woolworth Express before closing entirely. In 2001, Montgomery Ward closed along with the last of its stores nationwide. The same year, Hudson's was renamed Marshall Field's, which itself became Macy's when the parent company of Marshall Field's was acquired.

=== Mid-2000s to the present ===
The former Montgomery Ward location was demolished in 2005 for a new section called the Outdoor Village. Opened in early 2006, this addition features additional mall tenants in an outdoor setting. Anchoring the Outdoor Village is a Barnes & Noble bookstore, the opening of which resulted in the closure of a B. Dalton bookstore within the mall itself.

Mervyns also closed its Michigan operations in early 2006. A year later, their space at the mall was replaced with Burlington Coat Factory (now known as Burlington), which relocated from an existing store nearby. Steve & Barry's was added in the former Woolworth space. It closed in early 2009 when the chain declared bankruptcy, and became a clothing store called Wear District in October. Wear District later closed and became Shoe Dept. Encore. In 2012, the mall was sold to by Jones Lang LaSalle to Spinoso Group.

Since 2002, the mall has had a branch of Genesee District Library in it. The branch was first opened as an experiment. It was first slated for closure in October 2013, but the library board instead decided to keep it open until at least 2014. Also in 2013, several storefronts were remodeled throughout the mall, including Bath & Body Works, Kay Jewelers, Justice, and Victoria's Secret. Lane Bryant, an original tenant, moved to a new space in the mall in 2014 which had been vacated by a Ruby Tuesday. A Planet Fitness opened in the Burlington Coat Factory wing in early 2015. An H&M opened in the JCPenney wing in November 2017.

Burlington relocated to a nearby strip mall on May 11, 2018. Sears closed on September 2, 2018, leaving JCPenney and Macy's as the only anchors in the center. On December 15, 2018, Play Big, an indoor playground consisting of mostly inflatable bounce houses and arcade games, opened in the former Burlington store.

In 2019, Forever 21 moved from its existing location near JCPenney to a larger location near Macy's, but it closed later that year.

On July 14, 2023, Play Big closed.

In January 2025, Macy's announced that its store at Genesee Valley would close in the first quarter of 2025; following its closure on March 23, 2025, JCPenney became the last remaining anchor tenant.
