= Livonia Marketplace =

Coordinates: 42°25′39.9″N 83°20′12.5″W

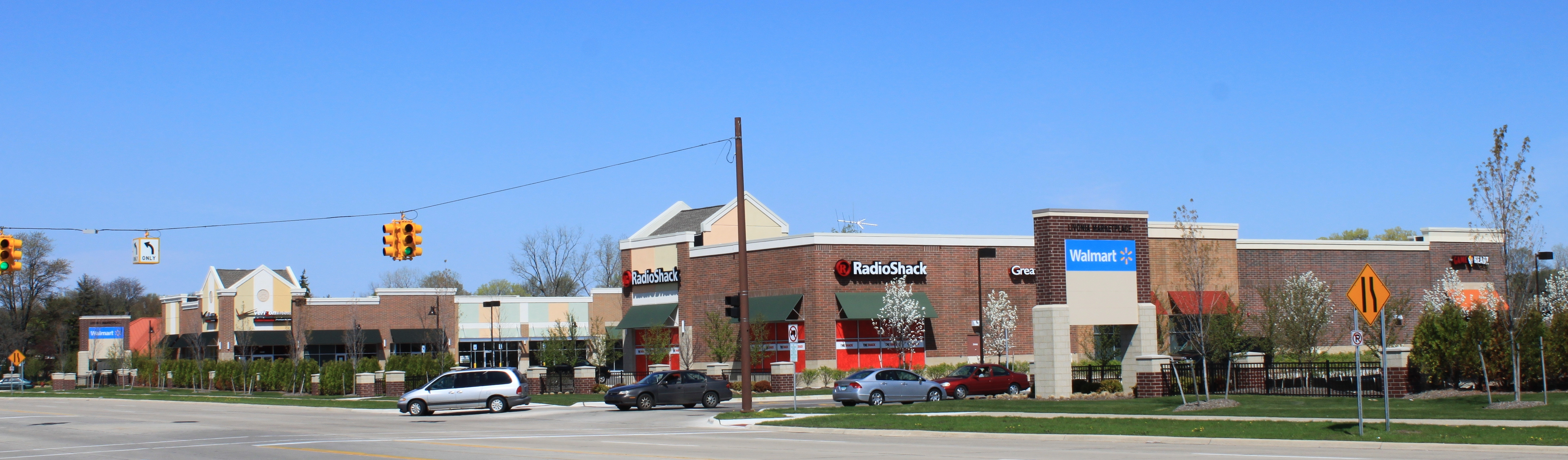
- Livonia Marketplace entrance, Seven Mile Road
- Location: Livonia, Michigan, United States
- Opened: October 29, 1964 (as Livonia Mall); 2010 (as Livonia Marketplace)
- Closed: May 31, 2008 (Livonia Mall)
- Developer: George R. Klein; Jack Shenkman; Schostak Brothers & Co.
- Owner: Lormax Stern
- Architect: King and Lewis (Livonia Mall)
- Num. of anchor tenants: 3 (2 open, 1 vacant)
- Floor area: 325,000 sq ft (30,200 m^{2})
- Floors: 1 (2 in former Sears)

Livonia Marketplace is an open-air shopping mall in the Detroit suburb of Livonia, Michigan. Opened in 2010, the center is anchored by Kohl's and Walmart. It occupies the site of the former Livonia Mall, which was an enclosed mall built in 1964. Livonia Mall lost the majority of its tenants in the 2000s, including its previous anchor stores of Crowley's (later Value City), Sears, Mervyn's, and Children's Palace. The mall was closed in May 2008, with only the Sears remaining from the original property. Sears closed in April 2020.

== History ==
Livonia Mall opened on October 29, 1964, as the second mall to be constructed in Livonia with Kresge and Sears as the original anchors. The site had been zoned for agriculture and was rezoned by the Livonia City Council for commercial use. A farmhouse, a large barn, and other agricultural structures were demolished before construction began. The Livonia Mall was among the first enclosed shopping malls to open in Michigan. The site now hosts one of the many strip malls located within Livonia and Metro Detroit.

The mall was developed as a joint venture between George R. Klein, Jack Shenkman, and Schostak Brothers & Co. King and Lewis served as the mall's primary architects. At the time of its opening, Detroit's suburbs were expanding, and new shopping malls were being developed within their boundaries. Livonia already featured an open outdoor mall in Wonderland Center (later Wonderland Mall), which opened in 1959 and closed in 2004. A year after the mall opened, a General Cinema theater, the first multiplex cinema in Michigan, was added in the Crowley's wing. During the early years of operation, the facility housed two grocery stores and provided space for a doctor's office and a dentist.

Julius Young opened the first Hot Sam Pretzels at the mall in 1966.

Livonia Mall remained largely unchanged until the late 1980s. In 1987, a new northern wing ending in a Mervyn's department store was added. Children's Palace, a toy store chain, was added to the west end of the mall in 1989. This store closed three years later and was eventually converted to a paintball arena, which closed in the mid-2000s. Value City bought the Crowley's store and two other mall-based Crowley's stores (at Universal Mall and Macomb Mall) in 1999, operating these as Crowley's Value City but later removing the Crowley's name. Konover Properties bought the mall in 2005.

By 2007, Dollar Tree, GameStop, Jo-Ann Fabrics and Foot Locker were the only national chains with a presence there (besides the anchor stores), and the remaining tenants were local, independent shops. The mall also lost its Mervyns store in early 2006 when the chain exited Michigan. Konover Properties announced plans in 2007 for a possible redevelopment of the mall, including the addition of a new big box retailer. Originally, plans called for the demolition of everything but the Sears and Value City stores. Value City subsequently closed in March 2008 when the chain went out of business, and the entire mall was shuttered except for Sears and Jo-Ann Fabrics on May 31, 2008. Demolition began in February 2009.

== Redevelopment ==
In September 2008, the City Council held a meeting to discuss redevelopment plans for the mall. Demolition of the vacant mall began in February 2009, and concluded in August of the same year. The Marketplace opened in mid-2010 with a Walmart Supercenter as a second anchor. Walmart opened in August 2010 along with Great Clips, a Verizon store, a RadioShack store, a Dots clothing store and Koney Island Inn, a Coney Island restaurant which opened at the original Livonia Mall in 1965. A Kohl's store opened March 2012.

On February 6, 2020, it was announced that Sears would be closing as part of a plan to close 31 stores nationwide. The store closed in April.
