= Oakland Mall =

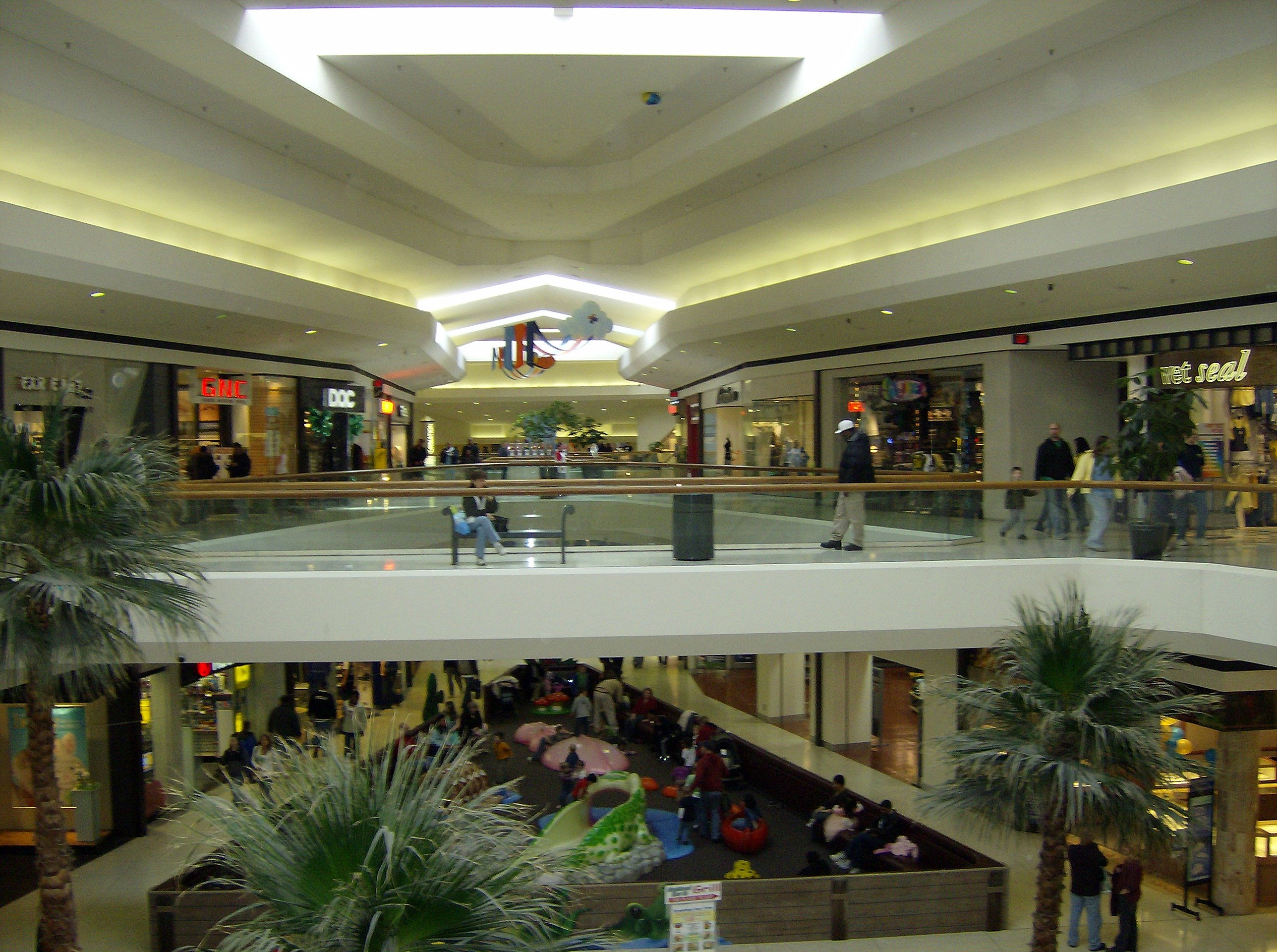
- View of the upper level
- Location: Troy, Michigan, U.S.
- Coordinates: 42.537°N 83.111°W
- Opened: 1968
- Developer: Kogan Companies
- Owner: MKiezi Investments
- Num. of stores: 104
- Num. of anchor tenants: 6 (5 open, 1 vacant)
- Floor area: 1,500,000 square feet (140,000 m^{2})
- Floors: 1 (2 in JCPenney wing, closed second and third floor in former Sears, 4 in former Macy's)
- Parking: Parking lot on premises
- Public transit: SMART 492, 495, 760, 780
- Website: oaklandmall.com

Oakland Mall is an enclosed super-regional shopping mall in Troy, Michigan. It is located in the northwest corner of the intersection of 14 Mile and John R. roads, adjacent to Interstate 75 (Chrysler Freeway). The mall features 116 stores, including a food court, plus several big-box stores on the periphery. The mall has 1,500,000 square feet (140,000 m^{2}). It is anchored by JCPenney, Dick's Sporting Goods, At Home, Slime Studio, and Hobby Lobby.

== History ==
The first store to open at the site of the Oakland Mall was Sears, which opened in 1965. In 1968, the mall itself opened, featuring Hudson's as another anchor. Also included was an S. S. Kresge dime store. In 1979, an expansion added a two-story wing anchored by JCPenney.

Borders Books & Music opened in 1999. The store, formerly a Winkleman's clothing store, was the first Borders to be located in a mall in Michigan. The movie theaters were closed in 2000 and were later converted to Steve & Barry's, which itself closed in early 2009. Hudson's was converted to Marshall Field's in 2001. In 2004, Lord & Taylor was proposed to become the mall's fourth department store; however, the store never materialized. September 2006 saw the conversion of Marshall Field's (and other May Co. nameplates) to the Macy's name. Borders closed in 2011 due to the chain's bankruptcy. In 2013, Forever 21 moved from its existing location in the Sears wing to the former Borders. In late 2014, the Gibraltar Furniture and Rug store in the former Steve & Barry's closed. In this area, a new Dick's Sporting Goods was moved from a nearby shopping center to the mall, which opened in fall 2015. H&M opened a 20,000 square ft. store in the Macy's wing. Field & Stream opened northwest of JCPenney in March 2015. In 2016, the mall was taken over by CBRE.

In 2015, Sears Holdings spun 235 of its properties, including the Sears at Oakland Mall, into Seritage Growth Properties. Krispy Kreme and LongHorn Steakhouse are outparcels on the Seritage site. In 2017, in an effort similar to Macomb Mall's Sears, Oakland Mall split off a section of its Sears to become an At Home. On June 28, 2018, Sears announced that its Oakland Mall location would be closing as part of a plan to close 78 stores nationwide. The store closed on September 2, 2018. In 2022, the remaining portion of the former Sears store became Hobby Lobby which opened on December 26, 2022. Slime Studio also has since occupied part of the former Sears space that was still available.

In October 2019, Dick's Sporting Goods sold the Field & Stream to Sportsman's Warehouse. In 2020, Oakland Mall was acquired by CenterCal Properties, before being sold again in March 2022 to Mario Kiezi, who announced plans to renovate the mall.

In 2024, McInerney Auto Center opened a shop in the former Sears Auto Center.

In January 2025, Macy's announced that its store at Oakland Mall would close in the first quarter of 2025. The store closed on March 23, 2025. Later that year, Forever 21 closed its Oakland Mall location, as a result of the company going out of business.

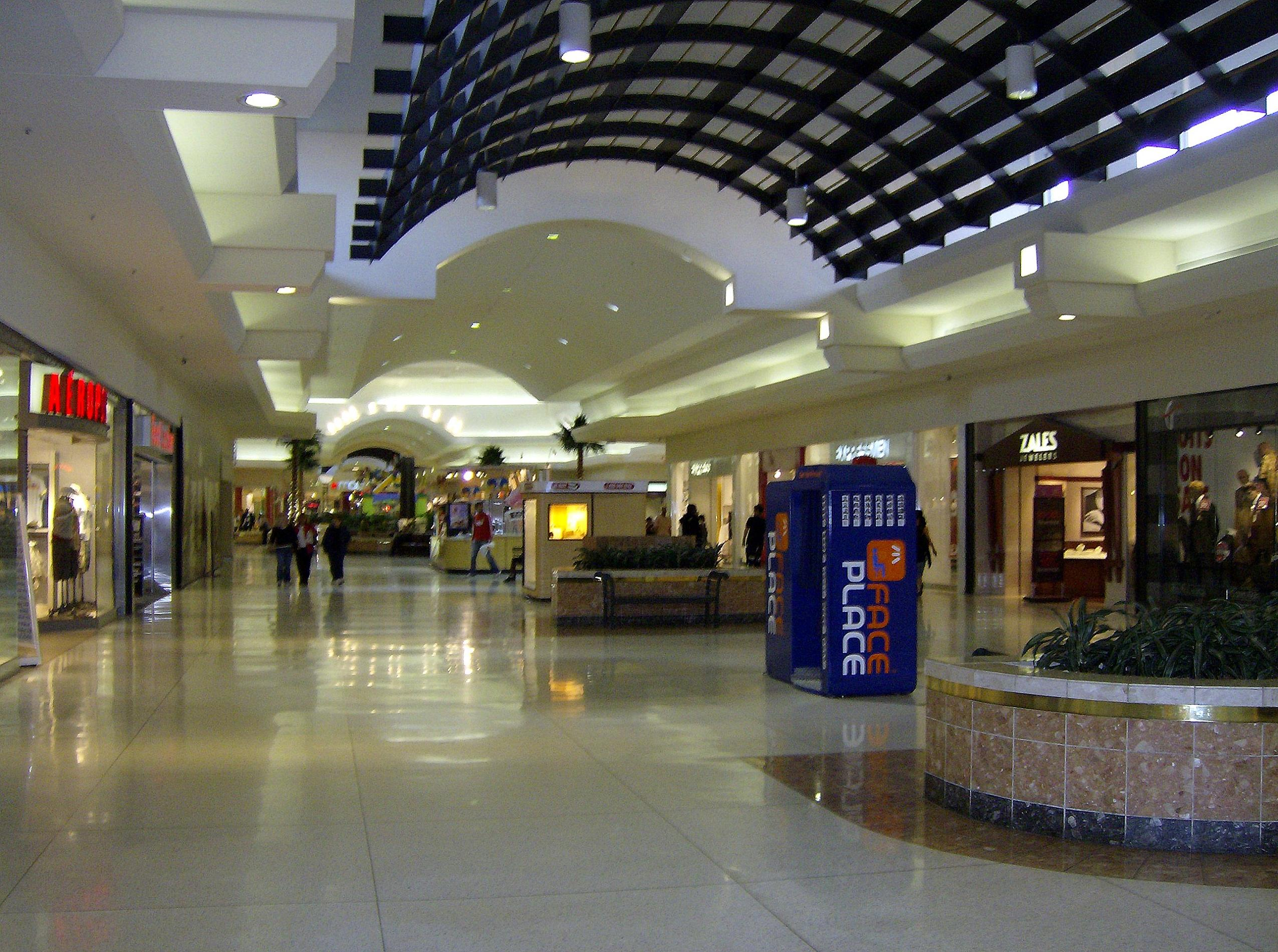
The older main level of the mall

Oakland Mall began repurposing vacant space left by departing anchors for community-focused uses, including showcasing local art, and hosting events and fundraisers benefiting local organizations.
