= Tel-Twelve Mall =

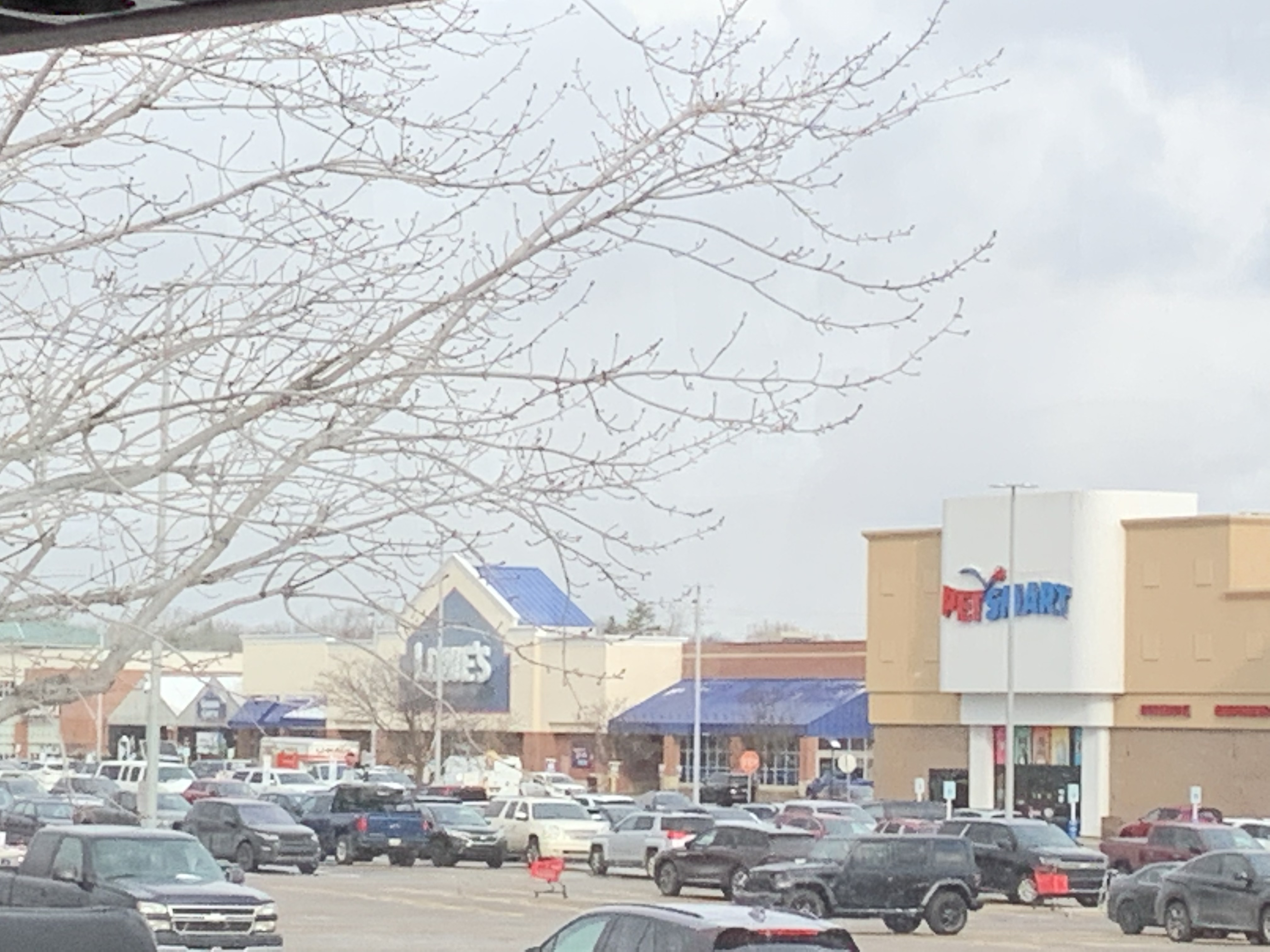
- Stores at Tel-Twelve Mall, November 2024
- Location: Southfield, Michigan, United States
- Coordinates: 42.499°N 83.283°W
- Address: Telegraph Road
- Opened: 1968 (original indoor mall) 2001 (current power center)
- Closed: 2001 (original indoor mall)
- Developer: Ramco-Gershenson Properties Trust
- Manager: RPT Realty
- Owner: Kimco Realty
- Architect: Charles N. Agree
- Num. of stores: 20
- Num. of anchor tenants: 7
- Floor area: 523,411 square feet (48,626.5 m^{2}) (GLA)
- Floors: 1
- Public transit: SMART 275, 375, 405, 740, 760

Tel-Twelve Mall is a shopping mall located in Southfield, Michigan, a suburb of Detroit, Michigan, United States. Developed as an enclosed mall in 1968, it was demolished and rebuilt in 2001 as a power center composed of big box tenants. Its anchor stores include Best Buy, DSW, Lowe's, Meijer, Michaels, Ulta Beauty, and PetSmart. The complex is owned and managed by RPT Realty, a subsidiary of Kimco Realty since 2024, the successor to Ramco-Gershenson Properties Trust, the same company that developed it.

== History ==
Tel-Twelve Mall opened in 1968 along Telegraph Road just north of Interstate 696 in Southfield, Michigan. The mall initially comprised two anchor stores: Kmart at the northern end and Montgomery Ward at the southern end, with a Chatham supermarket as a junior anchor in between. It was designed by A&W Properties (now Ramco-Gershenson Properties Trust), with Charles N. Agree as architect. It originally featured a fountain and Astroturf floors.

At the time of its opening, Tel-Twelve Mall's viability was questioned by retailers, as Southfield already had a larger shopping mall, Northland Center. Tel-Twelve was expanded four times in its history, eventually gaining a Crowley's department store as a third anchor in 1985, as well as a food court. In the early 1980s, Silver's Office Supplies had replaced the Chatham.

In 1994, a renovation of the mall added many stores, including Ruby Tuesday, Old Country Buffet, DSW Shoe Warehouse, and Media Play. The Montgomery Ward store was downsized to make room for MC Sports and Office Depot, the former of which became Circuit City by 1996. Due to space limitations, a portion of the store had to be located across the mall hallway from the rest of the store. It was also the first Circuit City store to be located inside an enclosed shopping mall.

Crowley's closed in 2000, followed by Montgomery Ward a year later. Although the mall was still 85% occupied at the time, its tenant roster was largely composed of local stores. Ramco-Gershenson had made a decision to demolish everything except for Kmart, Montgomery Ward, Office Depot, and Circuit City, and replace the rest of the complex with a strip mall. Kmart closed soon afterward, and its former location at the mall was demolished for a Meijer. The former Montgomery Ward was replaced with Michaels and Pier One, while other big box stores such as Lowe's supplanted the rest of the former enclosed mall space. DSW also relocated to a new store on the site of the mall. Media Play became Best Buy, while the former Circuit City slot eventually became a PetSmart. The Office Depot closed in 2019, and an Ulta Beauty store opened in its place by 2020.
