= Lakeside Mall =

Defunct mall in Sterling Heights, Michigan, U.S.

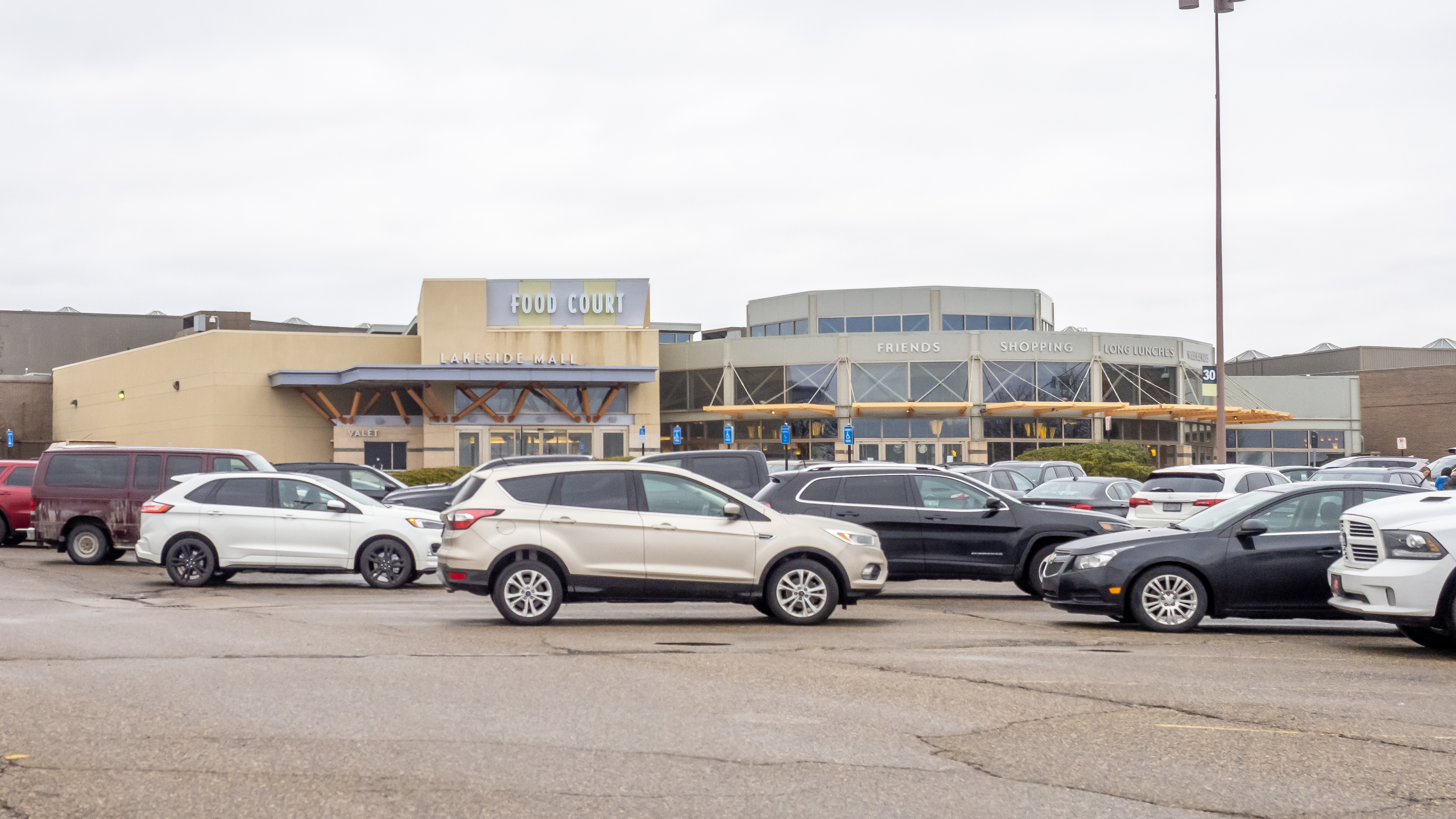
- Entrance to the food court, 2021
- Location: Sterling Heights, Michigan, United States
- Coordinates: 42.623447°N 82.985809°W
- Opened: March 2, 1976; 50 years ago
- Closed: July 1, 2024; 2 years ago
- Developer: A. Alfred Taubman, Homart, and Dayton Hudson
- Owner: Out Of The Box Ventures
- Num. of stores: 0
- Num. of anchor tenants: 5 (1 occupied, 4 vacant)
- Floor area: 1,550,450 sq ft (144,042 m^{2})
- Floors: 2
- Public transit: SMART 510, 530, 550
- Website: shop-lakesidemall.com

Lakeside Mall is a defunct super-regional shopping mall in Sterling Heights, Michigan. Located on the M-59 commercial corridor, the mall is currently anchored by JCPenney, with four vacant anchor stores previously occupied by Macy's, Lord & Taylor, and Sears. With 1,550,000 square feet of leasable retail space spanning two floors, Lakeside was the largest mall in Michigan by leasable square footage when it closed on July 1, 2024.

Following the mall's closure, the property is slated to be redeveloped into Lakeside City Center, a mixed-use development, with construction expected to begin in 2026. JCPenney plans to remain open during construction, while the rest of the mall is planned to be demolished at an undetermined date.

== History ==
Lakeside Mall started as a joint venture between A. Alfred Taubman, Homart Development, and the Dayton Hudson Corporation. It opened on March 2, 1976 with four anchor stores: Hudson's, Sears, Crowley's, and JCPenney with Lord & Taylor added in 1978 as a fifth anchor. The mall was designed and built in a similar style to other Taubman-developed malls of the era, including Fairlane Town Center and Twelve Oaks Mall elsewhere in the Detroit suburbs.

In 1983, Toys "R" Us opened a store across from the mall. In 1999, after the Crowley's chain filed for bankruptcy, Hudson's purchased the Crowley's building and moved its men's clothing and home goods into the space, an arrangement that continues today under Macy's.

In April 1984, the mall was the first in Michigan to feature an indoor tubular waterslide called the Hydrotube. The waterslide covered large areas of the mall, making it highly notable.

In 1988, Rodamco acquired Homart's interest in the center and became a 50/50 joint venture partner with Taubman. In 2000, Rodamco became the sole owner of Lakeside in an interest swap with Taubman involving Twelve Oaks Mall. In 2001, Hudson's stores were renamed Marshall Field's as part of a nameplate consolidation by parent Target Corp. Steve & Barry's also opened. Lord & Taylor reconstructed and expanded their existing store in 2003.

The Rouse Company acquired Lakeside Mall in 2002 from Rodamco via a joint venture involving the Simon Property Group and the Westfield Group. Rouse was acquired by General Growth Properties two years later.

FYE relocated in 2006 to a smaller store, and H&M opened its first Michigan location in June 2006.

Marshall Field's was one of several nameplates converted to Macy's in 2006, as Federated Department Stores (now Macy's, Inc.) had acquired Marshall Fields' then-parent, May Company. Both the main and auxiliary Field's stores at Lakeside Mall were rebranded. A year later in 2007, plans were announced for a $3 million renovation of the mall and its periphery. Renovations included new signage and improved pedestrian access to the mall. Exterior renovations began in late 2008. In 2014, Lakeside Mall cleared out a part of the lower level Sears wing to make way for an MC Sports. In 2016, a Jeepers! opened, relocating from Great Lakes Crossing Outlets. MC Sports closed in 2017 along with the rest of the chain due to its bankruptcy. Also in 2017, the mall was acquired by Jones Lang LaSalle, due to GGP defaulting on one of its loans. Later in the year, Macy's Backstage opened in part of the main Macy's store.

=== Decline and redevelopment ===
In May 2018, Sears announced the closure of its Lakeside store, alongside 62 other underperforming stores; the store closed on September 2 of that year. Later, in June 2019, Lord & Taylor announced that their Lakeside location would also close; it closed on September 15, 2019.

By 2018, plans were being considered to redevelop Lakeside. The mall was sold to Out Of The Box Ventures, a division of Miami-based Lionheart Capital, for $26.5 million in December 2019. In addition, it was announced that the mall's surrounding properties would be developed in an enhanced development surrounding the mall.

On May 1, 2024, Lakeside's owners announced that the mall would permanently close on July 1, 2024. JCPenney and Macy's both remained open, and announced that they would remain as anchors during the redevelopment. Macy's later announced in January 2025 that both of its stores at Lakeside would permanently close; they closed on March 23, 2025. During redevelopment the mall is surrounded by 24-7 security following urban explorers breaking in.
