= Crowley's =

Department Store Chain

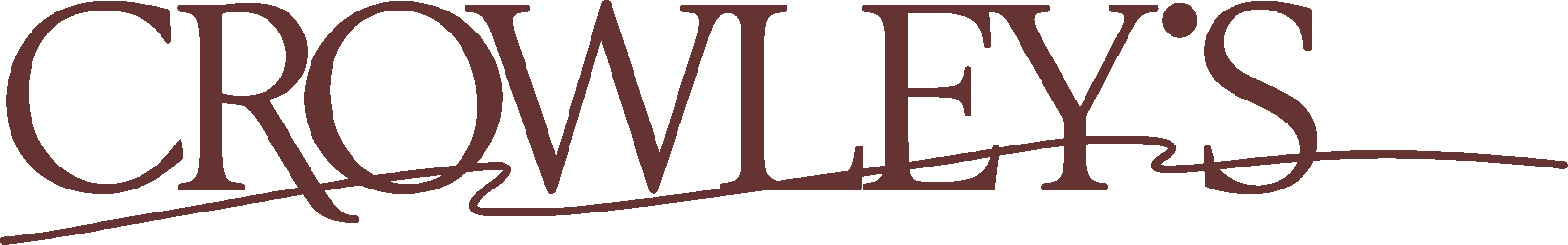
- Industry: Department store
- Founded: 1909
- Defunct: 1999
- Fate: Chapter 11 Bankruptcy; Liquidation
- Successor: Value City
- Headquarters: Detroit, Michigan; United States
- Key people: Joseph, William, and Daniel Crowley
- Number of employees: 1,300
- Parent: Crowley Milner and Company
- Subsidiaries: Steinbach's

Crowley Milner and Company, generally referred to as Crowley's, was a department store chain founded in Detroit, Michigan, in 1909. After several years of financial difficulties, the company ceased operation in 1999 and its assets were sold.

Its flagship store, corporate office and warehouse complex occupied two blocks in downtown Detroit for almost 80 years. The store was a direct competitor of the J. L. Hudson Company and the Ernst Kern Company until Kern's closed in 1959. Crowley's and Hudson's were both noted for their lavish annual Christmas displays. Faced with a decline in retail traffic in downtown Detroit, Crowley's closed its downtown location in July 1977. The firm operated a store in Detroit's New Center area that remained open until the chain's demise in 1999.

On March 11, 1995, the chain acquired Steinbach in the northeast US. When Crowley's ceased operation in 1999, several of its locations were purchased by discount chain Value City. Three in the Detroit area were rebranded Crowley's Value City and remained part of the Value City chain until it also ceased operating in 2008.

== History ==
In 1909, Joseph J. Crowley, his brothers William and Daniel, and William L. Milner joined to save the Detroit-based store of Pardridge & Blackwell that was struggling financially. Joseph Crowley previously worked as a credit manager for the Detroit wholesale firm of Burnham Stoepel and had great experience reorganizing struggling ventures. He and his brothers opened the Crowley Brothers Wholesale Dry Goods Company in 1902. William Milner was a regular customer of the Crowley Brothers through his W.L. Milner Department Store of Toledo, Ohio.

Pardridge & Blackwell formed in 1901 and was on the edge of insolvency due to poor management and the recession of 1907. The opportunity to assume control of the retailer came when an executive of the Central Savings Bank of Detroit, one of the store's creditors, approached Joseph Crowley. Crowley agreed on the condition that his two brothers and Milner join him and Crowley, Milner and Company was born.

Immediately after the incorporation of Crowley, Milner and Co., its owners envisioned the store as one of the highest quality retail operations in Detroit. At the turn of the twentieth century, Detroit was regarded as one of the most affluent cities in the United States, and Crowley, Milner & Co. helped to uphold this image. The owners stocked the store with luxurious clothing and gifts imported from Europe and opened a full-service restaurant and grocery store. Within ten years, the Crowley, Milner & Co. expanded its building and was the largest department store in Michigan.

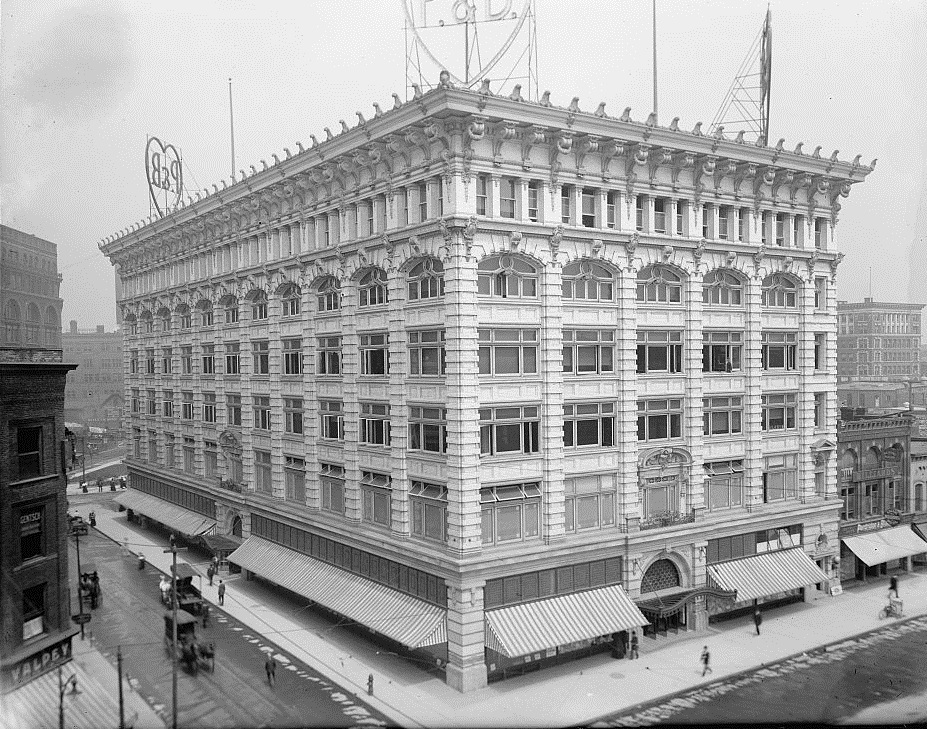
Pardridge & Blackwell Building c. 1910 from Farmer and Monroe Streets

The Pardridge & Blackwell Building occupied the western half of the block bounded by Farmer Street, Gratiot Avenue, Library and Monroe Streets. It contained six floors with large triple windows on the second through fourth floors divided by piers faced with white glazed brick and terra cotta. The piers formed arches above the windows of the fifth floor with windows on the sixth floor spaced between the corbels supporting the elaborate cornice above. Two large illuminated signs proclaiming ""P.& B." inside a heart graced the northwest and southwest corners of the roof. Crowley, Milner expanded the building by removing the cornice to add a seventh and eighth floor and expanding east to Library Street. In 1920, they then constructed an eleven-story "home store" on the site of the Goldberg Brothers store east of Library Street. Initially, the 100,000 sq ft (9,300 m^{2}) annex was connected to the main building by a tunnel. In 1923, the city of Detroit granted permission to connect the two structures above ground and an elaborate five-story bridge opened in 1925. The entrances on Farmer, Gratiot and Monroe were framed by large arches and the windows above the doors on the second floor were topped by a large pediment. One notable feature of the department store was wooden escalators which remained until the structure was demolished in 1977.

The company stumbled slightly when Milner was killed in 1923 while traveling to his store in Toledo. The company lost its president and merchandising expert and his 42 percent interest in the corporation was sold by his heirs. Without Milner, the store eventually came to be known as Crowley's, but the company retained its full name until 1999. Joseph Crowley succeeded his friend and partner as president, but the loss of full control by the tight-knit group affected the company for many years.

Like many retailers, the Great Depression impacted Crowley's deeply. Sales plummeted from $39 million in 1928 to only $10 million in 1929. Joseph Crowley died in 1937 and his widow repurchased the shares of the company sold by William Milner's heirs to give the Crowleys majority ownership in the corporation. Daniel J. Crowley, Joseph's son, became president and helped the company chart a course to recovery.

=== Expansion ===
Crowley's logos

The company began its transformation from a single store to a chain in 1959 when Crowley's expanded to the Detroit suburbs by opening its first store in the Westborn Shopping Center in Dearborn. This was followed by a store in the Grand River/Greenfield shopping area in northwest Detroit in 1960 and identical stores in the Livonia and Macomb Malls in 1964. However, this expansion was at the expense of the downtown store. By 1960, the store consolidated enough to allow the Veteran's Administration to lease the lower six-floors of the annex building for $147,000 per year.

In 1972, the firm purchased the Demery's chain which consisted of a store at Woodward and Milwaukee in the New Center neighborhood, and in the suburbs of Birmingham and Farmington Hills. The New Center store moved into the New Center One Building in 1986 and expanded in 1997.

The Lakeside Mall store in Sterling Heights opened in 1975 followed in 1980 by stores at Universal Mall in Warren and Arborland Center in Ann Arbor. The Tel-Twelve Mall unit opened in 1985. In 1986, stores opened in Westland and at Courtland Center in Burton, the latter approximately one hour north of Detroit.

The downtown store closed in 1977 due to declining sales. This was followed by closure of the office and warehouse building in 1978 and the Ann Arbor store in 1983 when the Arborland Center was converted to a discount center. Offices moved to a building on Lafayette Boulevard at the western edge of the downtown business district and remained there until the company's liquidation. The Grand River-Greenfield store was only 45,000 sq ft (4,200 m^{2}), but continuously performed well in sales. It was located in several storefronts along Grand River Avenue and in 1987 the landlord wanted to redivide the building to lure new businesses. It offered Crowley's a portion of the renovated structure but the store declined.

In 1985, members of the Crowley family, who still owned more than 51 percent of the company stock agreed to sell the store to Oakland Holding Company.

=== Decline ===
In 1990, Crowley's opened a new prototype men's store adjacent to its Farmington Hills store which immediately was successful. The store-within-a-store concept focused on men's businesswear and was immediately expanded to other branches.

This was an attempt to lure customers back from newcomers to the Detroit market such as MainStreet, a unit of Federated Department Stores which later became Kohl's, and Mervyns. Crowley's changed its product line to feature more upmarket with lines by Calvin Klein and Ralph Lauren aimed at the Hudson's or Lord & Taylor shopper. This move alienated many traditional customers as Crowley's was seen as a more mid-market store with locations in Detroit's older suburbs.

The prototype men's clothing store proved to be a successful move. Sales were strong, and the company discussed plans to introduce more similar stores in the future. This store within a store had its own entrance and focused on men's suits and accessories; similar to the Men's Wearhouse. The young men's and sportswear was in the located in the main store. Also, Crowley's instituted a "Frequent Buyer" program at all of its stores, as a method of encouraging customer loyalty. The program kept track of each customer's monthly purchase amounts, and then the stores issued gift certificates based on each person's sales figures.

Despite the initial success of the Frequent Buyers program and the new store format, annual sales dropped almost $10 million from 1991 to 1992.

In March 1991, Crowley, Milner & Co. announced it was seeking a merger partner that was large enough to help the company expand. It was management's opinion that long-term growth for the Crowley's chain would come through acquisition of some type, with the most likely scenario being an acquisition by another party.

In late 1992, the company opened a store carrying only women's clothing in Lansing, based on the concept of its men's store in Farmington. The store was unsuccessful and analysts were split on the reasons. Some felt it was due to the location or layout while others cited the unfamiliarity of the Crowley's brand in the Lansing market.

In 1993, the company obtained a revolving line of credit from Schottenstein Stores, which provided Crowley, Milner & Co. with the ability to resume payments to its creditors. It then implemented other changes which included a new computer software system to manage personnel, closing the Westland store and eliminating the Frequent Buyers program.

The result was that sales increased in 1994 and the company announced its first profitable quarter in almost five years. Management continued to rebuild financial stability by obtaining a new working capital loan from Congress Financial Corporation to replace the agreement with Schottenstein Stores Corp. Management also announced a two-for-one common stock split, introduced its own credit card and the new slogan "Detroit's Own Department Store".

Sales in 1995 rose to $109.9 million (~$212 million in 2025). On November 21 of that year, Crowley's purchased the Steinbach chain with 24 stores in Connecticut, New York, New Jersey, New Hampshire and Vermont from the Schottenstein family. The company planned to sell approximately 10 of the stores and continue operation of the others. It ultimately retained 16 stores.

In 1996, Crowley's proposed a new store for Novi's Main Street development but this fell through by 1999, as did a 1998 takeover of local women's fashion chain Winkelman's. It did expand into the Winkelman's store at Tel-Twelve Mall and opened a separate Men's store in that mall.

On June 1, 1997, Crowley's opened its enlarged store in the atrium of the New Center One Building. The expansion was 7,500 sq ft (700 m^{2}) in space previously occupied by Winkelman's and a bookstore which became children's and home stores separate from men's and women's clothing. This was not their largest location, but was the most profitable store by square footage. At the same time it heralded the success of the New Center store, Crowley's announced a costly lesson from its purchase of Steinbach in the form of a $4 million (~$7.44 million in 2025) loss during the first quarter of 1997. This was up from $1.3 million (~$2.46 million in 2025) for the first quarter of 1996.

The losses proved too great and in 1997, the company began to downsize in the hope of remaining viable. Crowley's lost the lease on the Birmingham store it acquired as part of the Demrey's merger when the landlord announced it would redevelop the site into a retail-entertainment complex.[15]

Losses which were $5.2 million (~$9.57 million in 2025) for the first half of 1998 could not be offset with renovation delays in reopening its largest location, the Macomb Mall store in time for critical back to school sales. On January 4, 1999, Shottenstein Stores and Value City took control of Crowley's in a stock swap transaction. Two weeks later, trading of the company's stock was suspended.[16] On February 8, 1999, Crowley's filed for reorganization under Chapter 11 bankruptcy laws and announced it would liquidate the remaining nine Crowley's and 16 Steinbach's stores and sell eight additional locations to Value City.[9][17]

The Livonia Mall, Universal Mall, Macomb Mall and Westborn Mall stores were sold to discounter Value City who operated the three as Crowley's Value City.[13] The Westborn Mall location was resold and demolished to construct a Kroger.[14] Another mall-based location at Lakeside Mall in Sterling Heights was sold to Target Corporation to create an expansion to the Hudson's store. Four Steinbach stores in New Jersey (Ocean Township, Paramus, Manalapan, Egg Harbor Township) were also sold to Value City.
