= Kern's =

Company

- Company type: Department store
- Industry: Retail
- Founded: 1883
- Defunct: 1959
- Headquarters: Detroit, Michigan
- Products: men's, women's and children's clothing, footwear, jewelry, beauty products, bedding, housewares and home furnishings.

For the California beverage company, see Kern's (beverage company)

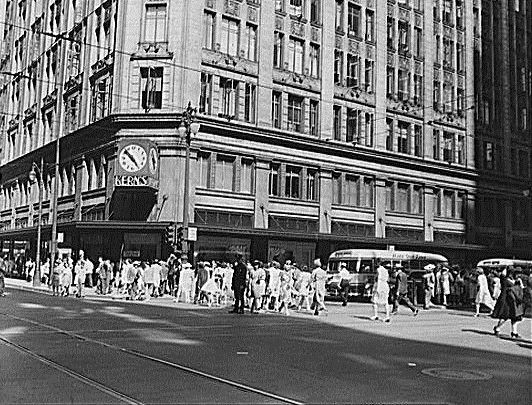
The Kern store in 1942

Kern's, or The Ernst Kern Dry Good Company, was a department store established in Detroit in 1883 by Ernst Kern, who was born in Germany. In 1886, the original store was consumed by fire and was rebuilt at Randolph and Monroe. In 1900, the company purchased a five-story building at Woodward and Gratiot to accommodate increasing business.

When Ernst Kern died in 1901, his sons Ernst C. and Otto assumed control of the store. After World War I, additional space was once again needed for expansion, and the department store acquired the adjoining nine-story Weber Building. In 1929, the old structures were demolished and a new store was erected at 1048 Woodward Avenue that was 49.3 m (162 ft) high and contained ten floors. In 1957, the family decided to sell Ernst Kern Co., by then Detroit's third-largest department store, to Sattler's Inc. of Buffalo, New York. Following numerous corporate problems and changes in management, the store closed its doors for the final time on December 23, 1959.

The store was demolished in the 1960s as part of Detroit's downtown urban renewal. The site remained an undeveloped park until 1999, when the Campus Martius Park project began. The former site of Kern's is now occupied by the Compuware corporate headquarters. A parking garage for Compuware is on the site formerly occupied by the neighboring Crowley's Department Store.

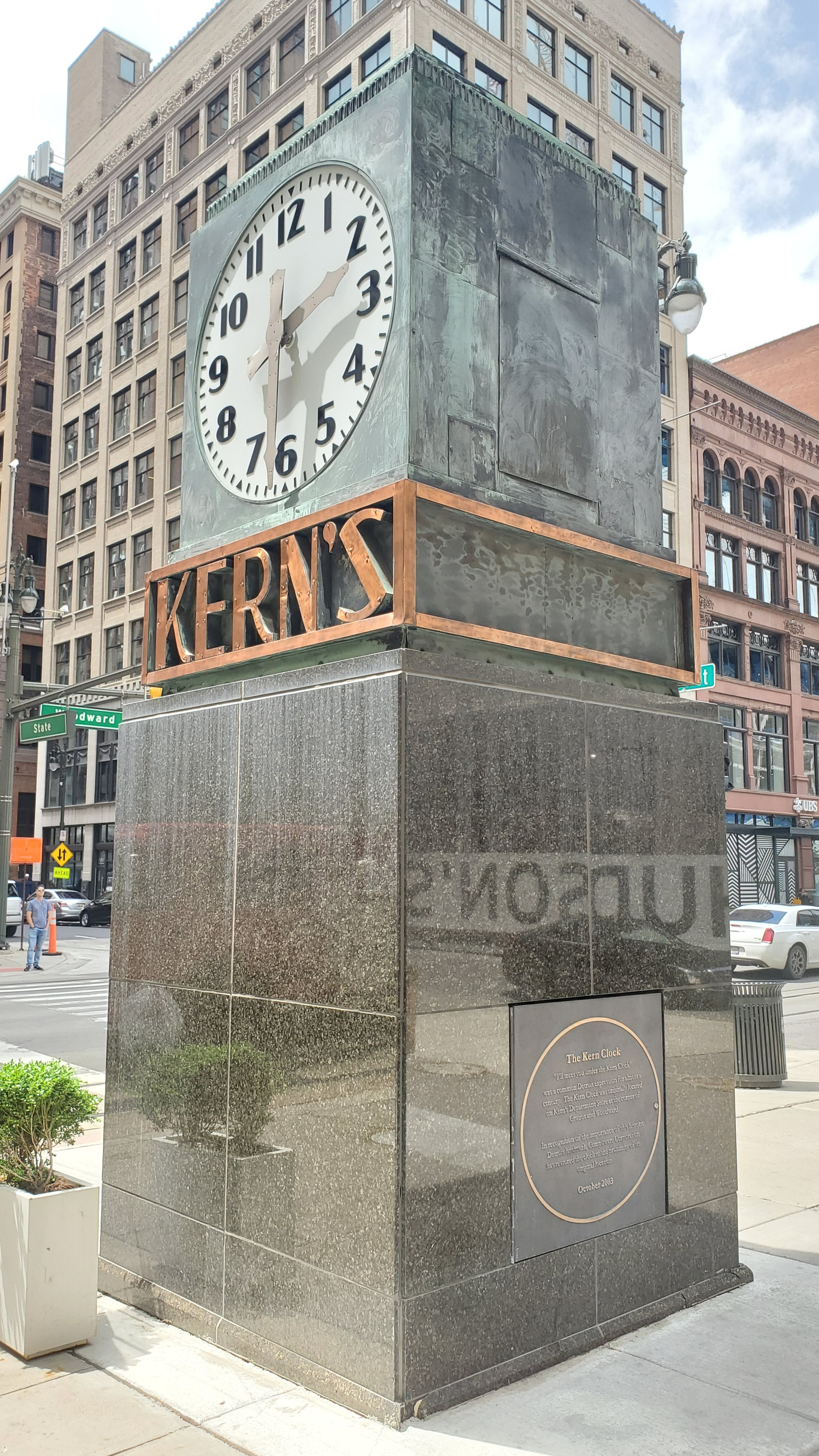
Kern's Clock in 2022

The clock which graced the main entrance was a long-time meeting place for Detroiters, with the phrase "I'll meet you under the clock at Kern's" a common reminder. When the structure was demolished, the clock was placed into storage. It was reinstalled near its original location in the late 1970s. It was removed and refurbished to allow for construction of the Compuware Building and installed again in 2008 at the corner of Woodward and Gratiot Avenues.

Kern's as it appeared from 1920 to 1960 in Detroit's Campus Martius, along with department store giants Hudson's and Crowley's

== See also ==
- Hudson's
- Crowley's
