= Universal Shopping Center =

- Location: Warren, Michigan, USA
- Coordinates: 42.502°N 83.083°W
- Opened: 1965 (original)
- Closed: 2008 (original)
- Developer: Forbes-Cohen
- Owner: Signature Associates
- Num. of stores: 35
- Num. of anchor tenants: 4
- Floor area: 600,000 square feet (55,741.8 m^{2})
- Floors: 1
- Public transit: SMART 494, 740

Universal Shopping Center, formerly Universal Mall and Universal City, is a redeveloped open-air power center located in Warren, Michigan, a suburb of Detroit. The first phase opened in mid-2009 with Target, Burlington Coat Factory, Marshalls, and Petco.

== History ==
Development was announced in 1962 for a site formerly occupied by a farm. Montgomery Ward was confirmed as the first anchor tenant at this point. The original mall opened in 1965 as Universal City with Montgomery Ward, Woolworth, and Federal's as its anchor stores. In 1980, Federal's went out of business and was replaced that same year by Crowley's. The opening of Crowley's coincided with a mall-wide renovation that included installation of new floors, ceilings, and seating areas throughout the concourses. Forbes-Cohen, the mall's original owners, sold it to Westfield Group in 1980. Seven years later, Westfield Group sold it to Schostak.

A western wing with Mervyns was added to the mall in 1988, and shortly afterward, the eastern wing was renovated to include a movie theater and food court.

In 1997, the F. W. Woolworth chain closed the last of its stores, leaving a large vacancy in the northern wing. Three years later, Montgomery Ward closed the last of its stores as well. Also in 1999, Value City acquired the Crowley's location at Universal Mall and two other Detroit-area malls and renamed them Crowley's Value City before dropping the Crowley's name entirely. Many of Universal Mall's major chain tenants either moved to other malls, or closed up entirely. By the end of the 1990s, Universal Mall's occupancy was below 35%, and it became a dead mall.

Universal Mall Properties acquired the mall in 1999, and mall renovations began soon afterward. Burlington Coat Factory opened that year, displacing the former Woolworth and most of the other stores in the northern wing; A.J. Wright opened a year later in a space formerly occupied by Ben Franklin in 1997. Plans were also made to divide the former Montgomery Ward space into smaller shops. Eventually, occupancy at Universal Mall rebounded to 75%, although by 2007 it had declined to 48% (in part due to the closure of Mervyns' Michigan operations in 2006).

The mall was closed in June 2008 and demolition began on the 23rd of that month, leaving only the Burlington Coat Factory, AJ Wright, theater and former Value City. The rest has been replaced by a strip containing 35 tenants, including Petco and Target. The last remaining tenant held over from when the mall was enclosed was Cinemark, which operated the movie theater since it opened in 1991 until it closed in mid-2016. It reopened as a location of MJR Theatres in late 2016. AJ Wright has since re-branded as Marshalls.
