= Passport (company) =

Payment service company

- Company type: Private
- Industry: Web and mobile payments software
- Founded: May 2010
- Founder: Bob Youakim; Charlie Youakim
- Headquarters: Charlotte, NC
- Website: www.passportinc.com

Passport is a Charlotte, North Carolina–based curb management payment service provider and software company.

Specializing in mobile payments for transportation, Passport provides an enterprise software platform for cities, transit agencies, universities, and private operators in the parking and transportation industries throughout the U.S. and Canada. Passport’s primary applications include mobile payments for parking and mobile ticketing for transit operations. Passport's software allows municipalities and private operators to charge users for parking without hardware payment stations.

== History ==
Passport was founded by Bobby Youakim and Charlie Youakim in Charlotte, North Carolina in 2010.

Investment firm Sixth Street Growth put up the capital for Passport with a reported $90 million investment. In 2017, the company raised $43 million in Series C funding led by Bain Capital. By 2021, the company had raised nearly $200 million.

In February 2023, Passport partnered with AutoReturn, a towing management systems provider that provides cities with a parking citation management system. Passport's mobility management platform allows for integration with any towing company, like Auto Return, allowing enforcement officers to quickly issue a tow through their handheld devices.

== Acquisitions ==
The company acquired Scottsdale, Arizona-based ParkX LLC in 2016.

In 2018, Passport acquired NuPark, a license plate reading company. In 2021, NuPark was sold to T2 Systems.

== See also ==
Thunes
