= Steinbach (store) =

American department store chain

- Company type: Department store
- Founded: 1870; 155 years ago in Long Branch, New Jersey
- Founders: John, Henry and Jacob Steinbach
- Defunct: 1999
- Fate: liquidation
- Headquarters: Asbury Park, New Jersey, United States
- Area served: New Jersey; New York; Connecticut; New Hampshire; Vermont
- Owner: Crowley, Milner and Co. (1995-1999)

Steinbach was a department store chain based in Asbury Park, New Jersey with locations throughout the United States northeast. It opened in 1870 and was purchased by Supermarkets General Corporation (SGC) in the 1960s, and was shuttered in early 1999 after filing for Chapter 11 Bankruptcy.

== History ==
Steinbach was founded in 1870 by the Steinbach brothers, John, Henry, and Jacob in Long Branch. The brothers expanded to the Asbury location four years later. In the early 20th century, Steinbach's was considered to be the "world's largest department store."

The company was at one time affiliated with the Kresge-Newark department store in downtown Newark. In the 1960s, the chain was purchased by Supermarkets General Corporation, and continued to operate as a standalone company. SGC also purchased the Howland chain in Bridgeport, Connecticut (which had previously merged the Genung's chain of stores into itself), along with the two-store Goerke's department store based in Elizabeth, New Jersey. Howland also continued to run as a stand-alone chain, while the Goerke's stores became part of the Steinbach chain, and in turn were rebranded Steinbach. In the 1970s, the chain opened three full line branches at shopping mall locations along the growing Jersey shore, including the chain's largest, a unit at the Shore Mall near Atlantic City. In 1976, a fourth mall location was opened at the Seaview Square Mall, near its downtown Asbury Park store.

The Seaview Square location was opened as the chain's most upscale store, and a number of departments were originally not part of the merchandise mix. This changed when the downtown Asbury Park location was closed in 1979, and Seaview Square was modified to include all departments that were carried at the former downtown store. The Asbury Park location burned down in 1989.

== Ownership changes ==
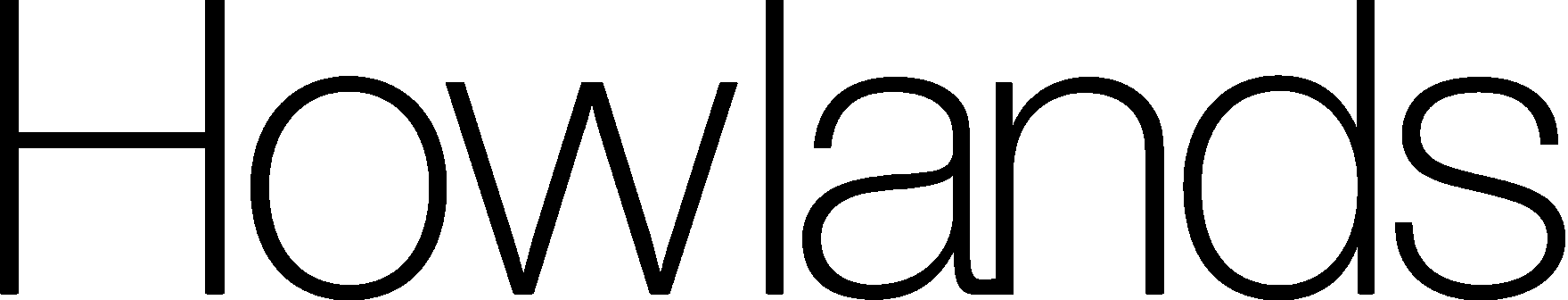
Howlands logo

In 1978, SGC merged the two chains together under the corporate name Howland-Steinbach. Each chain retained its original name, but were operated by a single corporate office.

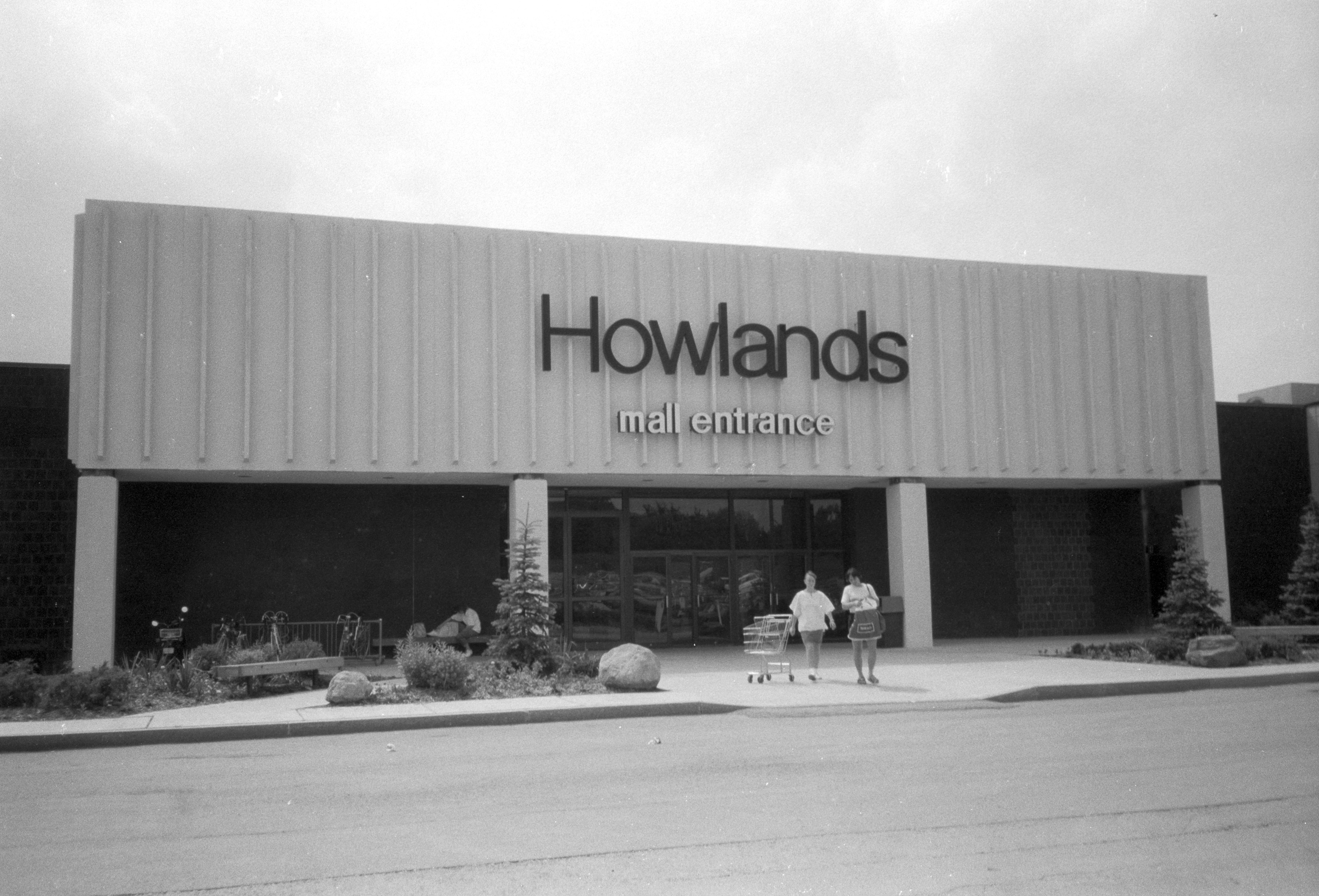
A Howlands store in Ithaca, New York, in 1987

SGC sold the chain in June 1986 to Netherlands-based Amcena Corporation, the owners of the New York City-based Ohrbach's chain. In January 1987, Amcena closed five Ohrbach's locations in the New York area, renovated them and opened them as Steinbach stores on March 12, 1987. The parent company also rebranded its 18 Howland stores to the Steinbach nameplate the same day.

By 1994, American Retail Group (Amcena) opted to sell the chain which Schottenstein's purchased entirely. In 1995, Detroit based Crowley Milner and Company purchased Steinbach but Schottenstein's retained a few locations that it converted as Value City stores or sold.

== Bankruptcy And Liquidation ==
In 1999, The chain filed for Bankruptcy under the title Chapter 11, which was converted into a Chapter 7 Bankruptcy Liquidation, and the company was liquidated with the rest of Crowley Milner.

== Flagship store ==
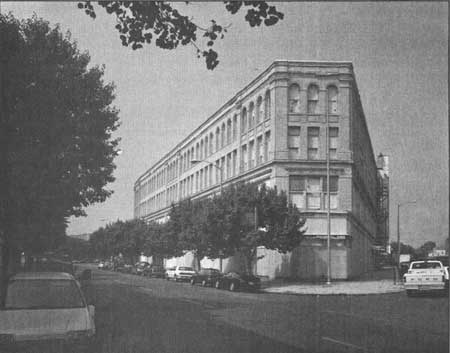
Steinbach flagship store following its 1979 closure

Steinbach had been a fixture in Asbury Park since the late 19th century, and by the turn of the 20th century, a new flagship store was planned and built on Cookman Avenue, billed as "The world's largest resort department store." This building initially contained five floors (basement level through fourth floor), and by the 1930s, a fifth floor and clock tower were added. As the Northern sections of the New Jersey shore started to suburbanize, Asbury Park and Steinbach became a focal point. The downtown Steinbach remained popular even after several nearby shopping centers opened, but the race riots during July 1970 cast a shadow over downtown, and shoppers started to avoid the area. Ownership changes also affected Steinbach, and in 1978, Steinbach's then-corporate parent, SGC, opened a new consolidated office building in White Plains, New York to serve as the headquarters for its department store holdings. This cost downtown Asbury Park over 100 jobs, and diminished the role of the downtown building. SGC also refocused Steinbach as a more value-oriented chain. This location, and all future locations, used mahogany wood for all fixtures and showcases.

In spring 1979, it was announced that the downtown Steinbach would close after a liquidation sale, with the store's closing on July 14, 1979. The public entrances were padlocked, and the remaining display windows were boarded up. Steinbach continued to use the building as a base for its maintenance staff for a few years, before abandoning the building entirely. In the late 1980s, an arson fire nearly destroyed the entire building, but did result in the removal of the clock tower and fifth floor.

Sackman Enterprises, which purchased the building in 2001, announced on March 1, 2007 that the first of 63 apartments was ready for rent following a complete renovation of the building. The ground floor now contains 22,000 sq ft (2,000 m^{2}) of retail space. The four floors above are loft-style apartments.

== See also ==
- Steinbach–Cookman Building, listed on the National Register of Historic Places
