= Suburban Mobility Authority for Regional Transportation =

Public transit operator in suburban Metro Detroit, Michigan

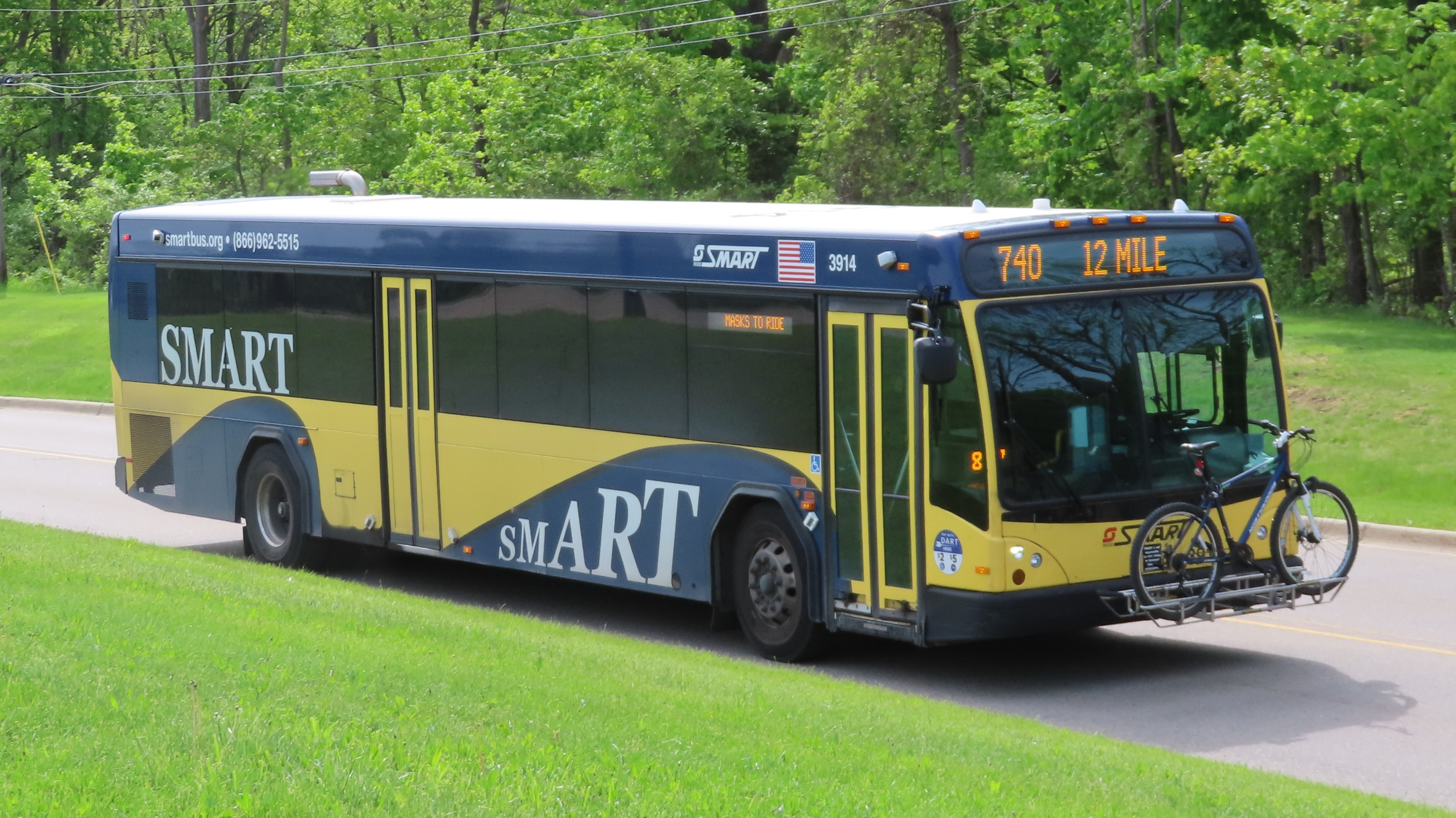
- SMART bus in Farmington Hills
- Founded: 1967
- Headquarters: Buhl Building; Downtown Detroit, Michigan
- Locale: Detroit
- Service area: Metro Detroit counties of Wayne, Oakland and Macomb
- Service type: Local bus service, express bus service, paratransit
- Alliance: RTA
- Routes: 45
- Hubs: Spirit Plaza; Jason Hargrove Transit Center; Royal Oak Transit Center; Dearborn Transit Center; Macomb Mall
- Fleet: 262
- Daily ridership: 23,875 (2024)
- Fuel type: Biodiesel; Electric
- General Manager: Tiffany Gunter
- Website: smartbus.org

The Suburban Mobility Authority for Regional Transportation (SMART) is the primary public transit operator serving the suburbs of Detroit in the U.S. state of Michigan. SMART operates 45 bus routes, as well as paratransit, dial-a-ride, and microtransit services. It is accompanied by the Detroit Department of Transportation (DDOT), which operates similar service in the city of Detroit and its enclaves.

== History ==
=== 1967–1989: SEMTA ===
The Michigan Legislature passed the Metropolitan Transportation Authorities Act of 1967, which included the creation of the Southeastern Michigan Transportation Authority (SEMTA). SEMTA was charged to take over the ownership and operations of the fractured regional transit systems in Macomb, Oakland, and Wayne counties, including the city of Detroit.

The new authority acquired several suburban transit bus operations including Lake Shore Coach Lines (1971), Pontiac Municipal Transit Service (1973), Dearborn's Metropolitan Transit (1974), Birmingham's Great Lakes Transit (1974), and Royak Oak's Martin Lines (1975). However, the 1967 transportation act did not provide the regional authority with any means to levy taxes. By 1974, the Detroit Department of Street Railways (DSR) had been reorganized as a city department of Detroit, leaving SEMTA only coordination over the suburban services. That same year, SEMTA acquired a commuter train service between downtown Detroit and Pontiac from the Grand Trunk Western Railroad. Due to declining ridership and a lack of funding, the commuter rail service was discontinued in October 1983.

In 1979, SEMTA approved a regional transit plan, which included improved bus service and new rail transit, but the plan was never implemented due to lack of funds. The last commuter rail service was a former Penn Central route, named the Michigan Executive, that ran from the Michigan Central Depot in Detroit to Jackson. Its final operator was Amtrak, as funded by the State of Michigan. The already pared down Executive service ended in 1984.

Beginning in 1983, SEMTA oversaw the construction of the Detroit People Mover, which was conceived as part of a much larger project of light rail lines and a downtown subway. Mismanagement of the project resulted in tens of millions of dollars in cost overruns, causing the federal government to pull out of the project. In 1985, with the half-built project in limbo, the city of Detroit negotiated with SEMTA to take over the project, and it was transferred to the newly created Detroit Transportation Corporation.

=== 1989–2009: Reorganization as SMART, opt-out system ===
Logo used from 1989 to 2022, still extant on most vehicles

With little interest in the suburbs for expanding mass transit and Detroit not interested in joining the system, SEMTA was restructured as SMART in 1989, reducing the authority's service area from seven counties to four and excluding the city of Detroit. Mike Duggan, then Wayne County's deputy county executive and vice chair of SMART's board of directors, was named the agency's general manager in February 1992.

The first millages to fund SMART passed by wide margins in Macomb and Wayne counties in May 1995, followed by a similar millage in Oakland County the following June. While the Macomb millage was levied countywide, the millages in Wayne and Oakland were only voted upon by communities whose councils opted to participate. Other communities chose to leave SMART to avoid the new property tax, setting up the "opt-out" system that remained in place for much of SMART's history.

In October 1994, SMART introduced Job Express, a shuttle service (similar to microtransit) which transported workers from SMART hubs to nearby workplaces. The service was offered in three areas, extending one mile each from the Royal Oak Transit Center, Fairlane Town Center, and Macomb Mall. Initial plans called for up to fifteen such service zones, though only two were added (one spurring from Lakeside Mall, and another serving Somerset Collection), and the Macomb Mall area was expanded to cover much of Groesbeck Highway.

Livonia opted out of SMART in 2005, as the first, and so far only, community to leave the system since 1995. Walled Lake rejoined the following year.

In order to prevent possible service cuts, SMART raised its fares by $0.50 on December 1, 2009; there was also a $0.50 charge added to regional monthly pass users and DDOT transfers.

=== 2011–2017: Service cuts ===
In October 2011, SMART discontinued 22% of its scheduled service and laid off 123 employees. This was widely attributed to declining property values (following the Great Recession) which led to reduced property tax revenue, and the inability of the authority to reach an agreement with its unions.

In January 2012, the Farmington City Council voted 4-1 to opt out of SMART, though they unanimously reversed their decision two weeks later. Meanwhile, neighboring Farmington Hills narrowly voted to remain in the system.

Lathrup Village, which had opted out of SMART in 1995, rejoined the system in 2014.

=== 2018–2022: Expansion, integration, and rebranding ===
On January 1, 2018, SMART began operating three high frequency, limited-stop FAST bus services, connecting downtown Detroit to suburban communities with frequent service. FAST represented the first major expansion of the system since the 2011 service cuts.

In May 2019, SMART and DDOT unified their fare structures and introduced Dart, a common fare payment system, with regional passes and mobile ticketing. The QLINE joined Dart the following October.

In March 2021, SMART began offering Flex, a microtransit service, operated by Via Transportation under contract. Flex was initially offered in three small zones within SMART's service area, with one covering Dearborn and most of Taylor alongside portions of surrounding communities, another serving portions of Troy and surrounding cities, and the third serving communities along M-59 in Macomb County. Two more zones were added in August 2021 and May 2022, covering Auburn Hills and Pontiac, and Farmington and Farmington Hills, respectively.

In February 2022, the Auburn Hills City Council voted 5-2 to opt out of SMART. The city's exit was blocked by a judge in May, however, and Auburn Hills remained a member until the opt-out system's abolition in 2023. Macomb Township's board of trustees similarly passed a resolution in March expressing interest in opting out of SMART services.

=== 2022–present: Rebranding and Oakland County expansion ===
2022 saw a renewed push for a countywide expansion of SMART in Oakland County, ahead of the scheduled millage renewal that August. The Oakland County Board of Commissioners proposed replacing the existing SMART millage with a new ten-year .95 millage, levied on all homes in the county, not just in existing member communities. Approved by voters in November 2022, the millage abolished opt-out system in Oakland County, allowing for the expansion of SMART services to the far reaches of Metro Detroit. Work is underway for new routes to begin operations in 2023.

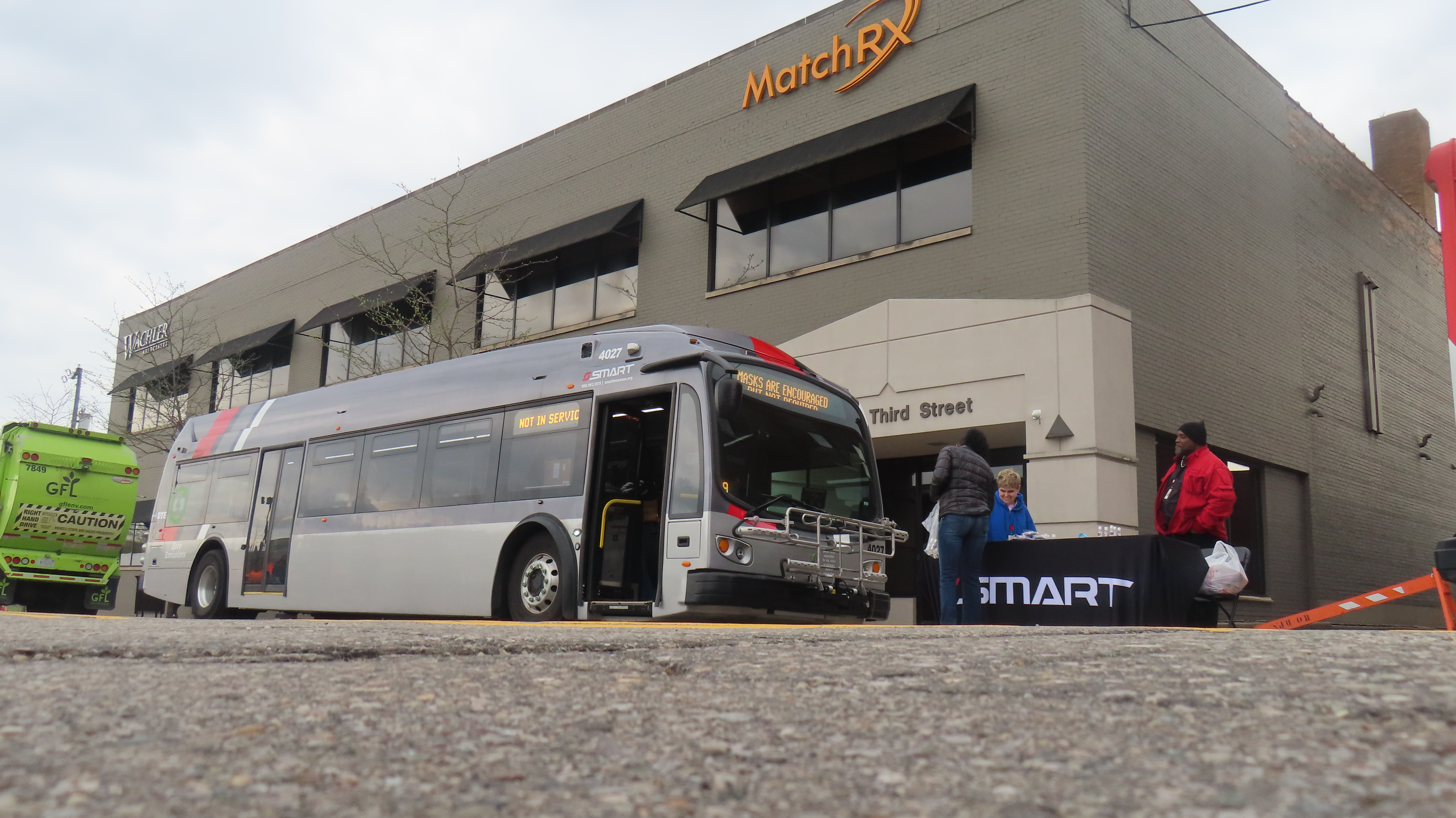
SMART Proterra ZX5 on display at an Earth Day event, 2023

SMART unveiled a new logo and branding in August 2022, coinciding with a new advertising campaign. The following month, SMART introduced their first electric bus, one of four Proterra ZX5 units purchased by the agency with a Federal Transit Administration grant.

In February 2023, the original Dart payment app was discontinued, as its creator, Passport, exited the transit payments market. Mobile Dart passes were moved to the Token Transit app.

== Millage and opt-out system ==
Since 1995, SMART has been funded in large part by a millage, renewed by voters in member communities in midterm election years through 2022. The millage has historically been approved by wide margins in every member community in Oakland and Wayne counties, though less so in Macomb County, passing there by a narrow margin of 39 votes in 2018. The millage was extended from four to five years in Wayne and Macomb counties, and to ten years in Oakland County, beginning in 2022.

SMART is notable among US transit systems for the ability of individual communities to "opt out" of the system. Opted-out communities are not subject to the taxes levied by the SMART millage, but as a result do not receive SMART's services. Some of these communities are members of smaller transit agencies providing paratransit services for seniors and disabled residents, but lack scheduled fixed-route bus service.

17 communities in Wayne County currently opt out of SMART service, of which all but one (Livonia) opted out with the first millage in 1995. Detroit is one such community, as its own DDOT provides fixed-route bus service to the city, though it is served by SMART's FAST limited-stop routes, as well as other routes during peak hours.

Communities in Macomb County and Oakland County are not able to opt out of SMART, as their millages have been levied countywide since 1995 and 2023, respectively. Four Oakland County communities opted out in 1995 but later rejoined: Bloomfield Township and West Bloomfield (both 1996), Walled Lake (2006), and Lathrup Village (2014). The 34 remaining opted-out Oakland County communities were added to the system in 2023.

=== 2022 changes & Oakland County expansion ===
In 2022, the SMART millage in Macomb and Wayne counties was extended to five years, and moved to the November general election ballot. Both were approved by wide margins.

In Oakland County, the SMART millage was replaced with a ten-year countywide public transit millage, which abolished the opt-out system in Oakland County, and funds three smaller paratransit providers (the North Oakland Transportation Authority, Western Oakland Transportation Authority, and Older Persons' Commission) alongside SMART. The county's Board of Commissioners approved the new millage proposal on August 10, 2022 in a bipartisan vote, with two Republicans joining all 13 Democrats on the board. The proposal appeared on the November 2022 general election ballot in all Oakland County communities, and passed with 57% of the vote. As a result, SMART's service area expanded to all of Oakland County on January 3, 2023, though new services in portions of the county (Novi, Bloomfield Hills, and Wixom) did not begin operation until September 2023, with initialization of further services in 2024.

=== Wayne County member communities ===
- Allen Park
- Dearborn
- Dearborn Heights
- Ecorse
- Garden City
- Grosse Pointe
- Grosse Pointe Farms
- Grosse Pointe Park
- Grosse Pointe Shores
- Grosse Pointe Woods
- Hamtramck
- Harper Woods
- Highland Park
- Inkster
- Lincoln Park
- Melvindale
- Redford
- River Rouge
- Riverview
- Romulus
- Southgate
- Taylor
- Trenton
- Wayne
- Westland
- Wyandotte

== Services ==
=== Fixed-route buses ===
SMART is the primary public transit operator serving Detroit's suburbs, and fixed-route bus services comprise the majority of its service. 44 routes of various types operate across SMART's three-county service area.

==== FAST ====
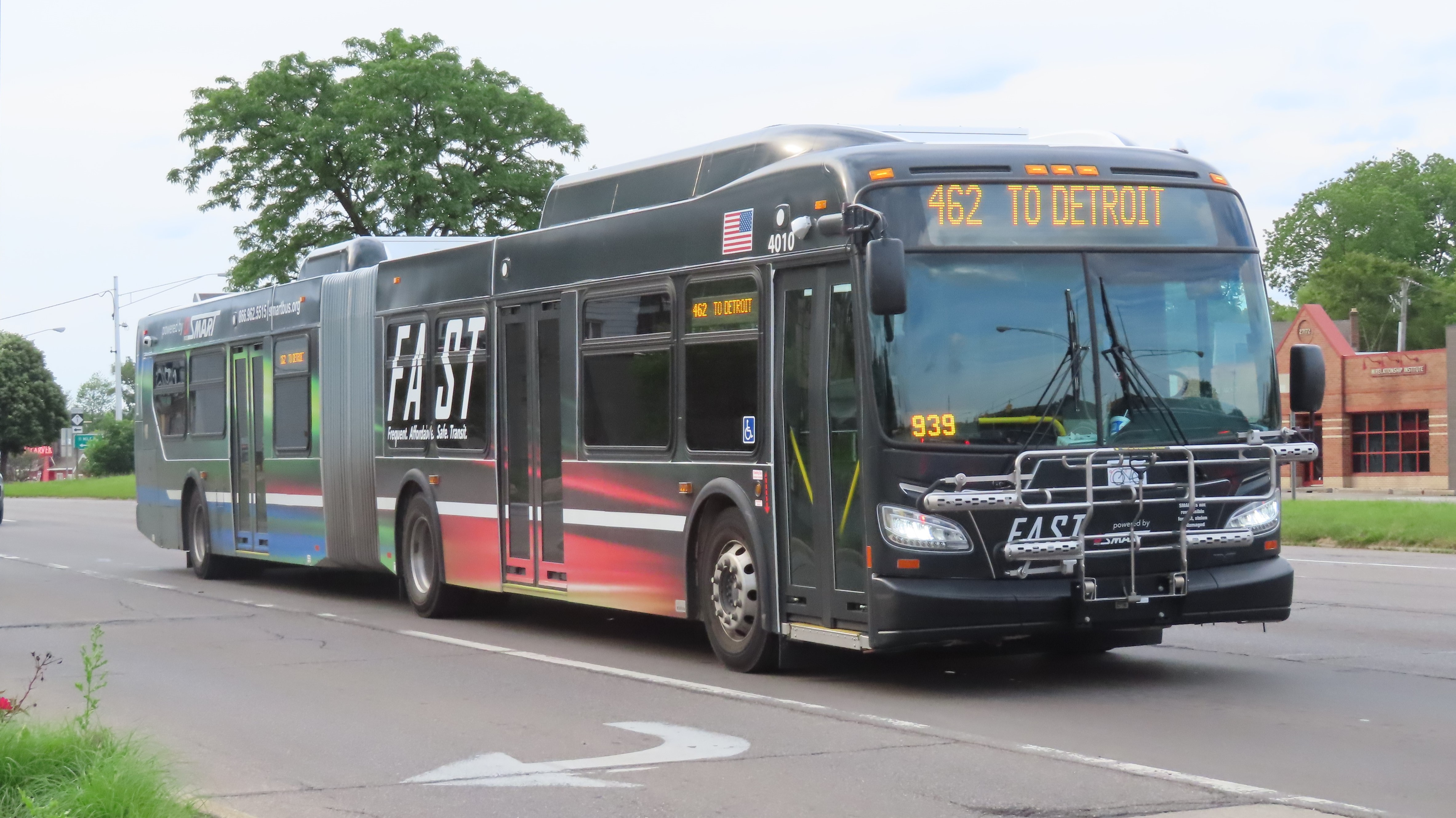
FAST Woodward bus in Berkley

Frequent Affordable Safe Transit (FAST) is SMART's flagship service; its limited-stop bus routes serve as the main arteries of the network, connecting the suburbs with downtown Detroit. Four FAST routes currently operate along three major Metro Detroit avenues - Gratiot, Michigan, and Woodward - with service every 20 minutes on weekdays (excluding along Michigan), and stops roughly every mile for most of their lengths.

Route Name	#	Termini		Length	Headway (minutes)			Notes
Route Name	#	Termini		Length	Mon-Fri	Sat	Sun	Notes
FAST Michigan	261	Spirit Plaza	Detroit Metro Airport	22.1 miles (35.6 km)	30	60	60	
FAST Woodward	461	Spirit Plaza	Troy Civic Center	24 miles (39 km)	40	60	60–110	Concurrent from Birmingham south, with service every 20 minutes combined; local stops in Pontiac on 462
FAST Woodward	462	Spirit Plaza	Great Lakes Crossing Outlets/Auburn Mile	32.5 miles (52.3 km)	40	60	120	Concurrent from Birmingham south, with service every 20 minutes combined; local stops in Pontiac on 462
FAST Gratiot	561	Spirit Plaza	Gratiot + 23 Mile	27 miles (43 km)	20	30	60	

Local routes

SMART's 34 local routes serve as the main public transit connection between Detroit's suburbs. Each is classified as either a high-ridership "main corridor" route, a long-distance "crosstown" route, or a "community" route focused on serving denser areas. Almost all connect to FAST, enabling connections to downtown Detroit. Most local routes run hourly, though a few are more frequent.

#	Route Name	Termini		Length	Headway (minutes)			Notes
#	Route Name	Termini		Length	Mon-Fri	Sat	Sun	Notes
125	Fort Street/Eureka Road	W Jefferson Avenue & Coolidge Highway (River Rouge)	Detroit Metro Airport	22.1 miles (35.6 km)	30	60	60	
140	Southshore	Dearborn Transit Center	Southgate Meijer	16.8 miles (27.0 km)	60	-	-	Interlined with 250
160	Downriver	Dearborn Transit Center	West Road & Grange Road (Trenton)	26.4 miles (42.5 km)	60	60	-	
200	Michigan Avenue Local	Fairlane Town Center	Michigan Avenue & John Hix Road (Wayne)	11.4 miles (18.3 km)	90	120	120	Concurrent from Wayne Road east.; Select late-night trips start and end at Michigan + Schaefer.
210	Michigan Avenue Local	Fairlane Town Center	Westland Meijer	16.8 miles (27.0 km)	90	120	120	Concurrent from Wayne Road east.; Select late-night trips start and end at Michigan + Schaefer.
250	Ford Road	Dearborn Transit Center	Westland Meijer	14.4 miles (23.2 km)	30	60	-	Interlined with 140
275	Telegraph - Taylor/Tel-Twelve	12 Mile Road & Telegraph Road (Southfield)	Eureka Road & Pardee Road (Taylor)	27.4 miles (44.1 km)	40–60	60	-	Overlaps with 375 from 7 Mile to 12 Mile
280	Western Wayne Crosstown	Old Redford Meijer (Northwest Detroit)	Detroit Metro Airport Evans Terminal	23 miles (37 km)	60	75	75	Only services Evans Terminal at Metro Airport
305	Grand River	Old Redford Meijer (Northwest Detroit)	Wixom Meijer	16.1 miles (25.9 km)	60	60	60	
350	Wixom	Commerce Township Walmart	Wixom Meijer	8.4 miles (13.5 km)	50	50	50	
375	Telegraph - Old Redford/Pontiac	Old Redford Meijer (Northwest Detroit)	Amazon Pontiac	24.4 miles (39.3 km)	60	60	-	Overlaps with 275 from 7 Mile to 12 Mile
405	Northwestern Highway	Jason Hargrove Transit Center	Commerce Township Walmart	21.4 miles (34.4 km)	60	60	-	
415	Greenfield	Northland	Royal Oak Meijer	8.7 miles (14.0 km)	70	70	45	Interlined on weekdays and Saturdays
420	Southfield	Northland	Royal Oak Meijer	9.1 miles (14.6 km)	70	70	-	Interlined on weekdays and Saturdays
430	Main Street	Royal Oak Transit Center	Adams Marketplace (Rochester Hills)	17.8 miles (28.6 km)	60	-	-	Select trips at peak hours divert to Royal Oak High School
450	Woodward Local - Pontiac	Jason Hargrove Transit Center	Downtown Pontiac	16.9 miles (27.2 km)	60	60	120	Concurrent from southern terminus to 10 Mile, and from 11 Mile to Maple; 460 diverts from Woodward to service downtown Royal Oak
460	Woodward Local - Somerset	Jason Hargrove Transit Center	Somerset Collection (Troy)	11.8 miles (19.0 km)	60	60	120	Concurrent from southern terminus to 10 Mile, and from 11 Mile to Maple; 460 diverts from Woodward to service downtown Royal Oak
492	Rochester	Jason Hargrove Transit Center	Oakland University (Auburn Hills)	28.1 miles (45.2 km)	60	60	-	
494	Dequindre	Jason Hargrove Transit Center	Auburn Road & Rochester Road (Rochester Hills)	18.3 miles (29.5 km)	60	60	-	
495	John R	Jason Hargrove Transit Center	Oakland Mall (Troy)	8.7 miles (14.0 km)	30	45	45	
500	Mound/Hamtramck	Spirit Plaza	Bel Air Shopping Center (Detroit)	11.8 miles (19.0 km)	60	60	60	
510	Van Dyke	Bel Air Shopping Center (Detroit)	Lakeside Circle (Sterling Heights)	15.8 miles (25.4 km)	20–30	30	60	Trips alternate between northern termini
510	Van Dyke	Bel Air Shopping Center (Detroit)	Shelby Township Walmart	19.2 miles (30.9 km)	20–30	30	60	Trips alternate between northern termini
525	Groesbeck	Bel Air Shopping Center (Detroit)	Clinton Township Meijer	18.3 miles (29.5 km)	60	-	-	
550	Garfield	Macomb Mall (Roseville)	Lakeside Circle (Sterling Heights)	12 miles (19 km)	60	-	-	Interlined with 615
560	Gratiot Local	Gratiot Avenue & 8 Mile Road (Detroit)	23 Mile Road & Altman Road (New Baltimore)	21.1 miles (34.0 km)	20	30	60	Most runs end at Gratiot & 23 Mile; one trip per hour continues to New Baltimore
610	Kercheval-Harper	Spirit Plaza	North River Road Park & Ride (Mt. Clemens)	30.9 miles (49.7 km)	60	60	65	Sunday trips divert to Vernier Road
615	Jefferson	Moross Road & Mack Avenue (Detroit)	Macomb Mall (Roseville)	11 miles (18 km)	60	-	-	Interlined with 550
710	9 Mile Crosstown	Moross Road & Mack Avenue (Detroit)	9 Mile Road & Telegraph Road (Southfield)	20.7 miles (33.3 km)	30	60	45	First eastbound trip daily starts at 9 Mile + Woodward No Sunday service west of Lodge Freeway (truncated to 10 Mile + Evergreen)
730	10 Mile Crosstown	Moross Road & Mack Avenue (Detroit)	10 Mile Rd & Telegraph Road (Southfield)	28.9 miles (46.5 km)	60	60	-	First two trips daily start, and last two end, at Royal Oak Transit Center
740	12 Mile Crosstown	13 Mile Road & Little Mack Avenue (Roseville)	Wixom Meijer	41.9 miles (67.4 km)	60	60	60	Select trips start and end in Royal Oak No Sunday service west of Woodward Avenue (truncated to Detroit Zoo)
759	Highland Road	Oakland University (Auburn Hills)	M-59 & Bogie Lake Road (White Lake)	19.7 miles (31.7 km)	50	50	-	
760	13 Mile/14 Mile Crosstown	13 Mile Road & Little Mack Avenue	12 Mile Road & Telegraph Road (Southfield)	26.4 miles (42.5 km)	60	-	-	Last westbound trip daily ends at Oakland Mall
780	15 Mile Crosstown	Harper Avenue & Metro Parkway (Clinton Township)	Oakland Community College Orchard Ridge Campus (Farmington Hills)	35.3 miles (56.8 km)	50	60	-	Last 3 westbound trips daily end at Somerset Collection
790	Pontiac Crosstown	Columbia Avenue & Baldwin Avenue (Pontiac)	Adams Marketplace (Rochester Hills)	17 miles (27 km)	60	60	60	Most weekday trips divert to serve Oakland County Courthouse & Service Center

=== 2027 Network Changes ===
===== New Routes =====
#	Route Name	Termini		Notes
120	Fort Street	Downtown Detroit	Vreeland Meijer	Limited stops between Downtown Detroit and Outer Drive, then makes all stops between Outer Drive & Vreeland Meijer via Corewell Trenton Hospital.
290	Newburgh	Wayne & Michigan	Grand River & Seven Mile	To replace the Wayne-Westland portion of Route 210.; Originally planned to run via Farmington, plans amended for the route to run via 8 Mile Road.
295	Plymouth	Canton Municipal Complex	Plymouth & Grand River	

===== Extensions/Modifications to existing routes (including schedule changes) =====
#	Route Name	Modification Plans	Notes
160	Downriver	Extension to West & Telegraph; Service re-routed from King to Sibley in northern Trenton	
200	Michigan Local	Extension to Amazon Canton & Ypsilanti Township	To connect with TheRide Routes 42, 43, and 68 at Holmes & Ridge.
210	Michigan-Westland	Service to be permanently discontinued. Replaced by Route 290 and extended 250.	
250	Ford Road	Extension to Canton Municipal Complex.	To replace a portion of Route 210 along Central City Parkway north of Ford Road.
255	Ford Road Express	Extension to Canton Municipal Complex.	2 Morning Peak trips to Detroit, 2 Afternoon Peak trips to Canton.
430	Main Street	Royal Oak High School deviation to become permanent. Stops along Main Street between 13 and 14 Mile Roads will be removed.	
525	Groesbeck	Saturday Service added to existing routing.; Weekday Trips extended to Macomb County Service Center (Verkuilen Building)	
780	Fifteen Mile	Sunday Service added between Birmingham (Woodward Avenue) and 16 Mile & Harper	

Commuter routes

In addition to FAST and local routes, SMART operates seven commuter express routes between Downtown Detroit and the suburbs during weekday rush hours. They run toward Detroit in the morning, and toward the suburbs in the afternoon; all seven follow roughly the same path through Downtown Detroit, serving Spirit Plaza and the Rosa Parks Transit Center.

Routes 255, 530, 620, and 635 run primarily on local roads, twice daily, while routes in the 800-series run primarily on freeways, three times daily.

#	Route Name	Suburban terminus	Length	Daily trips	Notes
255	Ford Road Express	Westland Police Department	20.1 miles (32.3 km)	2	Signed only as "Express" on headsign
530	Schoenherr	Lakeside Circle (Sterling Heights)	23.4 miles (37.7 km)	2	
620	Charlevoix	Macomb Mall (Roseville)	20.4 miles (32.8 km)	2	
635	Jefferson Express	Crocker Boulevard & Metro Parkway (Harrison Township)	23.4 miles (37.7 km)	2	
805	Grand River Park & Ride	Beck Road Park & Ride (Novi)	35 miles (56 km)	3	Concurrent with 305 from downtown Farmington to Novi Road
830	Downriver Park & Ride	West Road & Grange Road (Trenton)	22.8 miles (36.7 km)	3	Concurrent with 160 from Dix/I-75 to Dix/Northline, and from Trenton/Eureka to southern terminus
851	West Bloomfield-Farmington Hills Park & Ride	Orchard Lake Road & Lone Pine Road (West Bloomfield)	33.6 miles (54.1 km)	3	Breaks from freeway route to serve intermediate stops in Midtown Detroit and Southfield

==== Fares ====
SMART and DDOT share a unified fare structure, known as Dart, with most of their passes accepted by both agencies. A four-hour pass (the equivalent of a single bus ride) costs US$2 for most riders, with a reduced fare of 50¢ for riders aged 6–18 or over 64, as well as disabled riders. Daily, weekly, and monthly passes are also available, either as physical tickets, or digital passes through the Token Transit app.

==== Current bus fleet ====
Fixed routes are operated with a fleet of 262 buses, consisting mostly of biodiesel-powered 40-foot Gillig BRT units, as well as some articulated New Flyer Xcelsior and battery-electric Proterra ZX5 buses. Three terminals, one in each county of the service area, store and maintain the fleet.

=== Dial-a-ride and paratransit ===
==== Connector ====
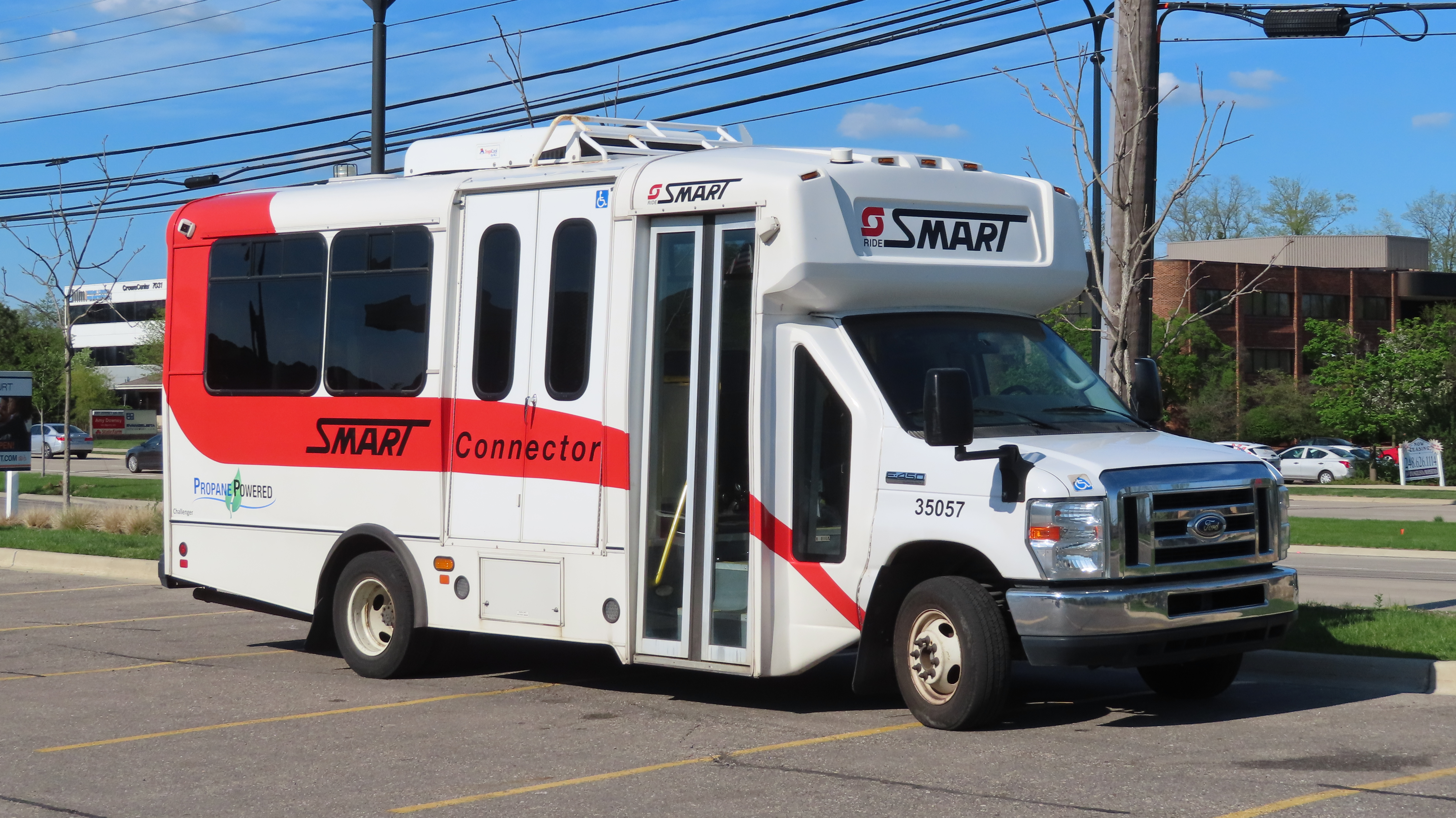
Connector minibus

Connector is a dial-a-ride service available across the SMART service area, which requires a reservation made by telephone at least one day in advance. It is available to residents of all ages, provided they live more than 1/3 of a mile away from a fixed route, though the distance requirement is waived for seniors (65 or older) and disabled riders.

Connector services are operated using a fleet of propane-powered Champion Challenger minibuses.

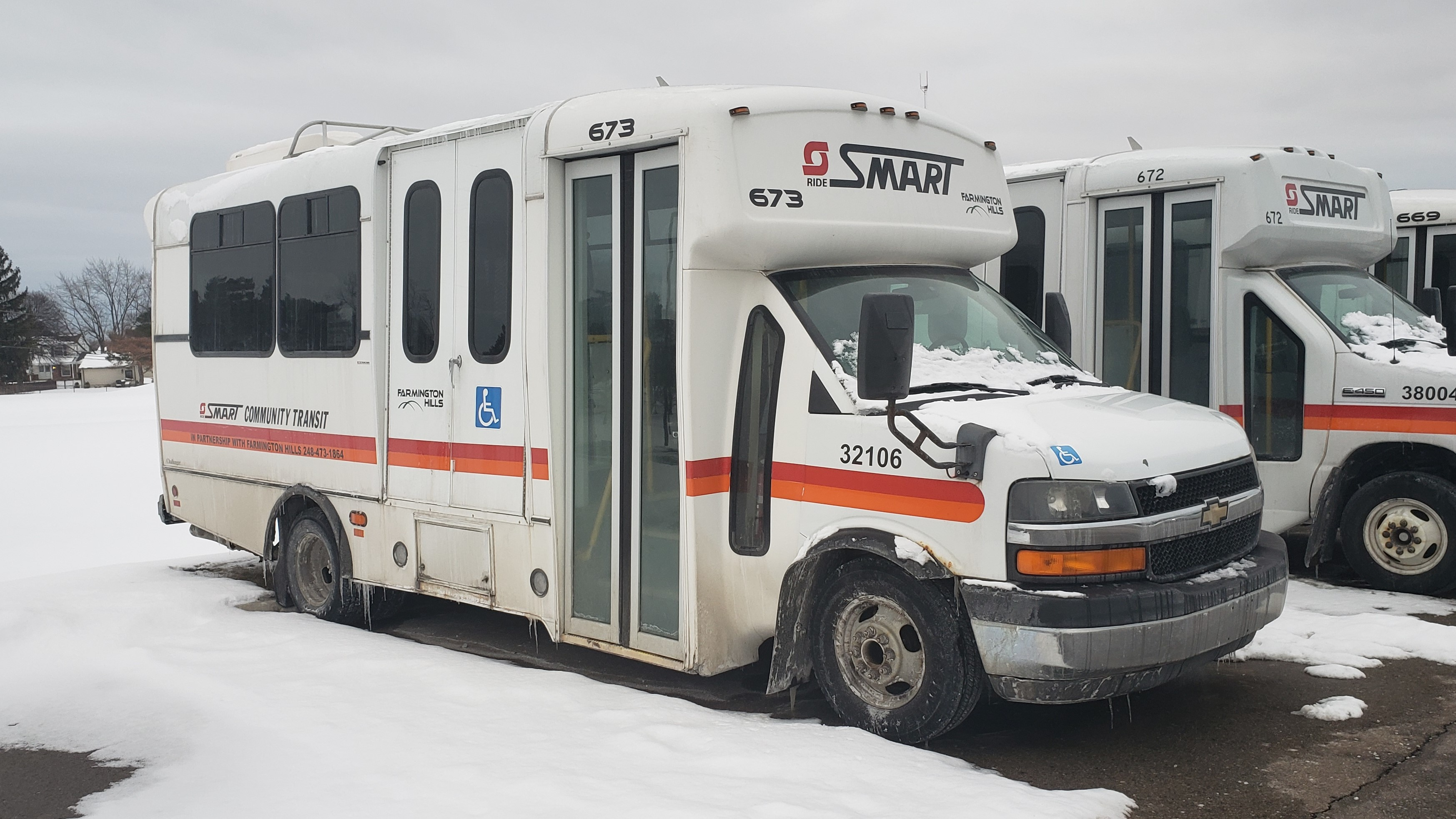
Community Transit minibus operated by the City of Farmington Hills

==== Community Transit ====
Community Transit is a similar paratransit service, available only to seniors and disabled riders. Unlike Connector, which is operated directly by SMART, Community Transit is operated by the municipal governments of member communities, as well as some nonprofit organizations.

Community Transit is operated with a fleet of Champion and ElDorado minibuses, and Ford E-Series and Transit vans, painted white with red-and-orange stripes.

=== Microtransit ===
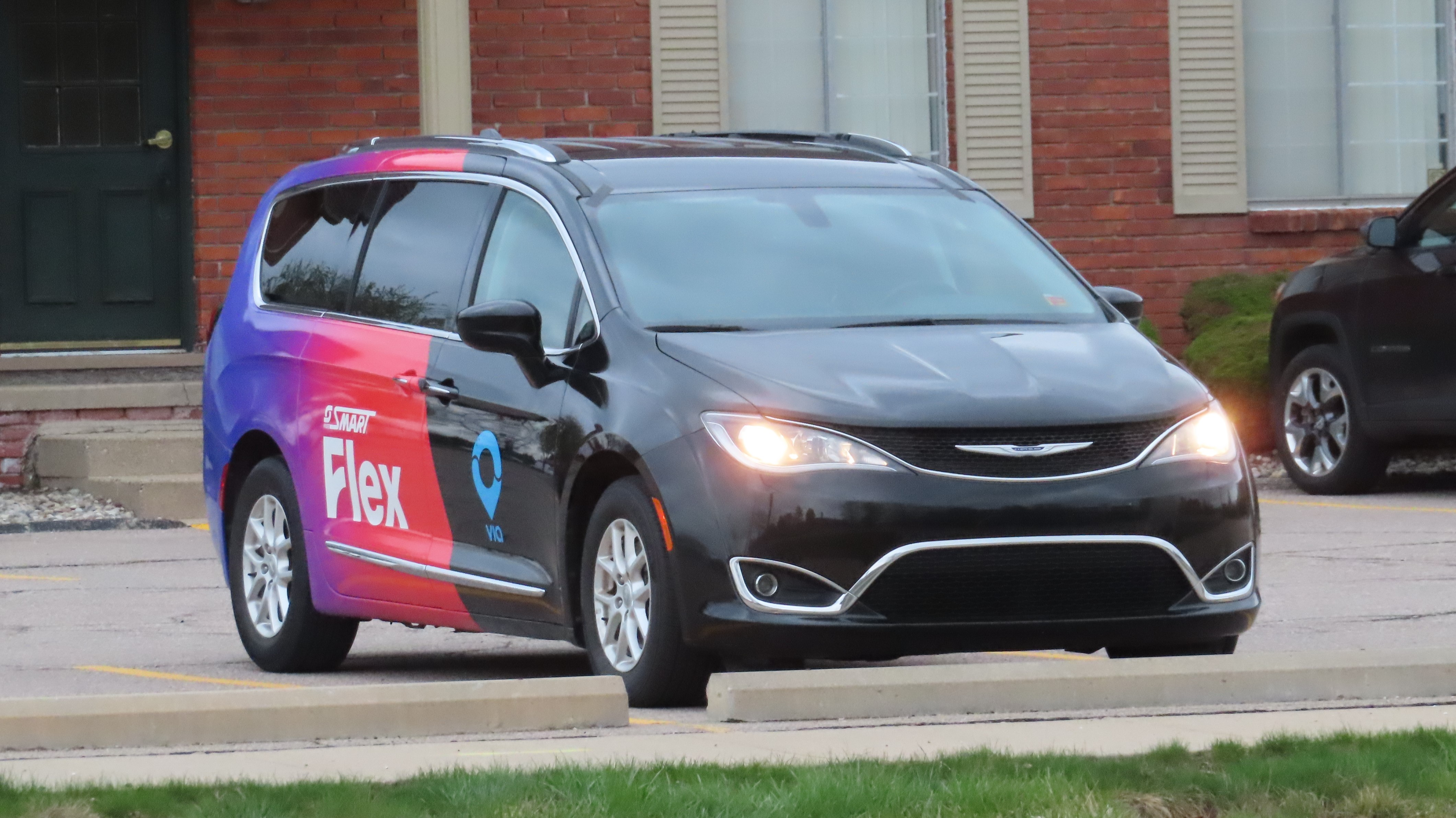
Flex Chrysler Pacifica

Flex is an on-demand microtransit service, operated under contract by Via Transportation. The service operates similar to ridesharing; a passenger books a ride via telephone or through the Flex smartphone app, and a marked minivan picks them up and takes them to their destination. Flex was launched in March 2021, and currently operates in five designated zones across the service area, covering all or part of 20 communities.

Flex vehicles are driven by independent contractors, referred to by Via as "driver partners." The fleet used for Flex, owned by Avis Budget Group, consists mostly of Chrysler Pacifica and Toyota Sienna minivans. Each vehicle seats three to five Flex passengers, and some are equipped to transport wheelchairs.

Flex fares are distance-based, ranging from $2 to $8, and paid through the Flex app with a major credit or debit card. Dart passes are also accepted on Flex.

=== Special event services ===
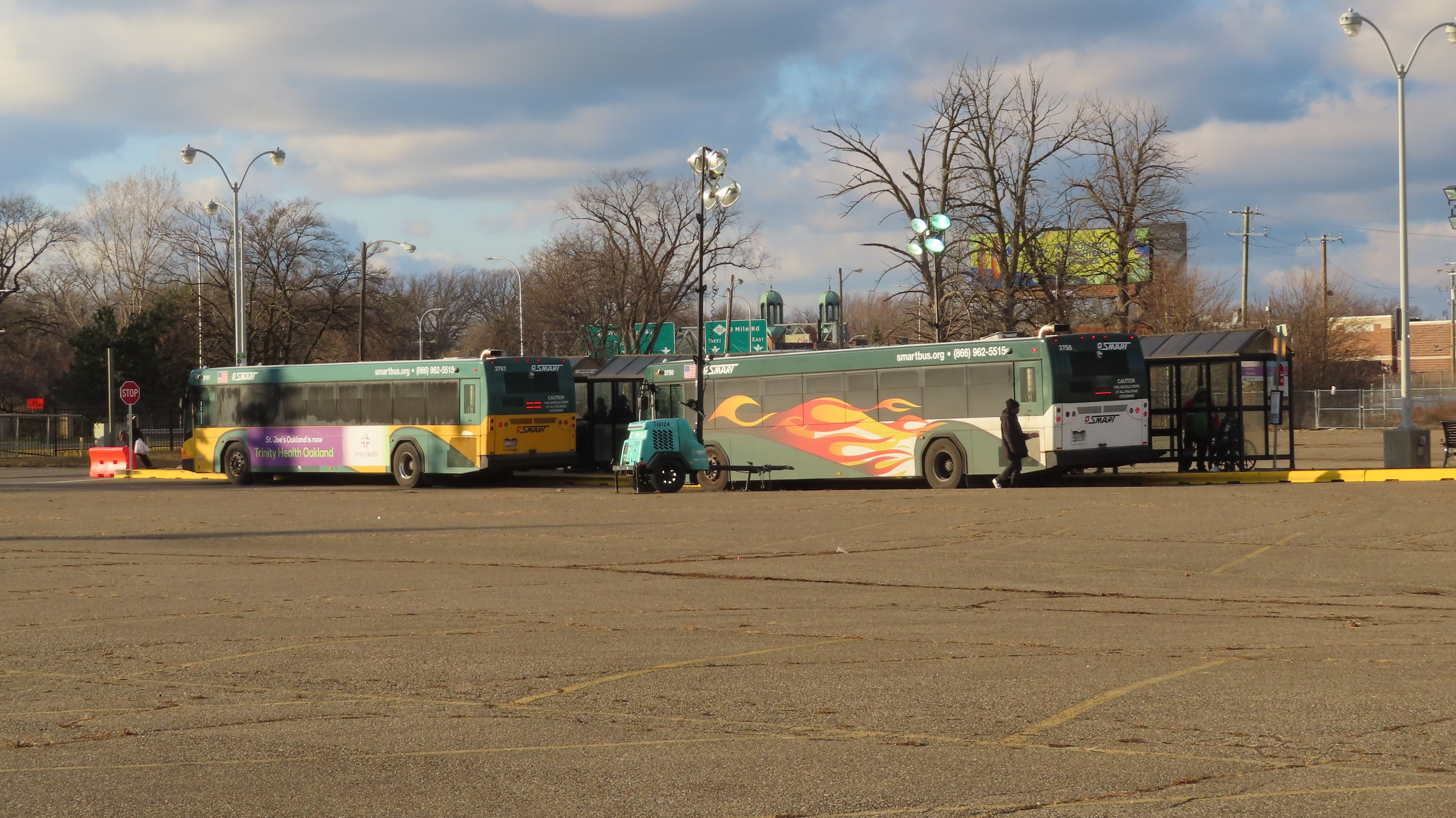
SMART bus with flame graphics (right) at the temporary State Fair Transit Center in 2022

SMART operates shuttle buses during the Woodward Dream Cruise, which is held annually in August along Woodward Avenue in Oakland County.

== Governance ==
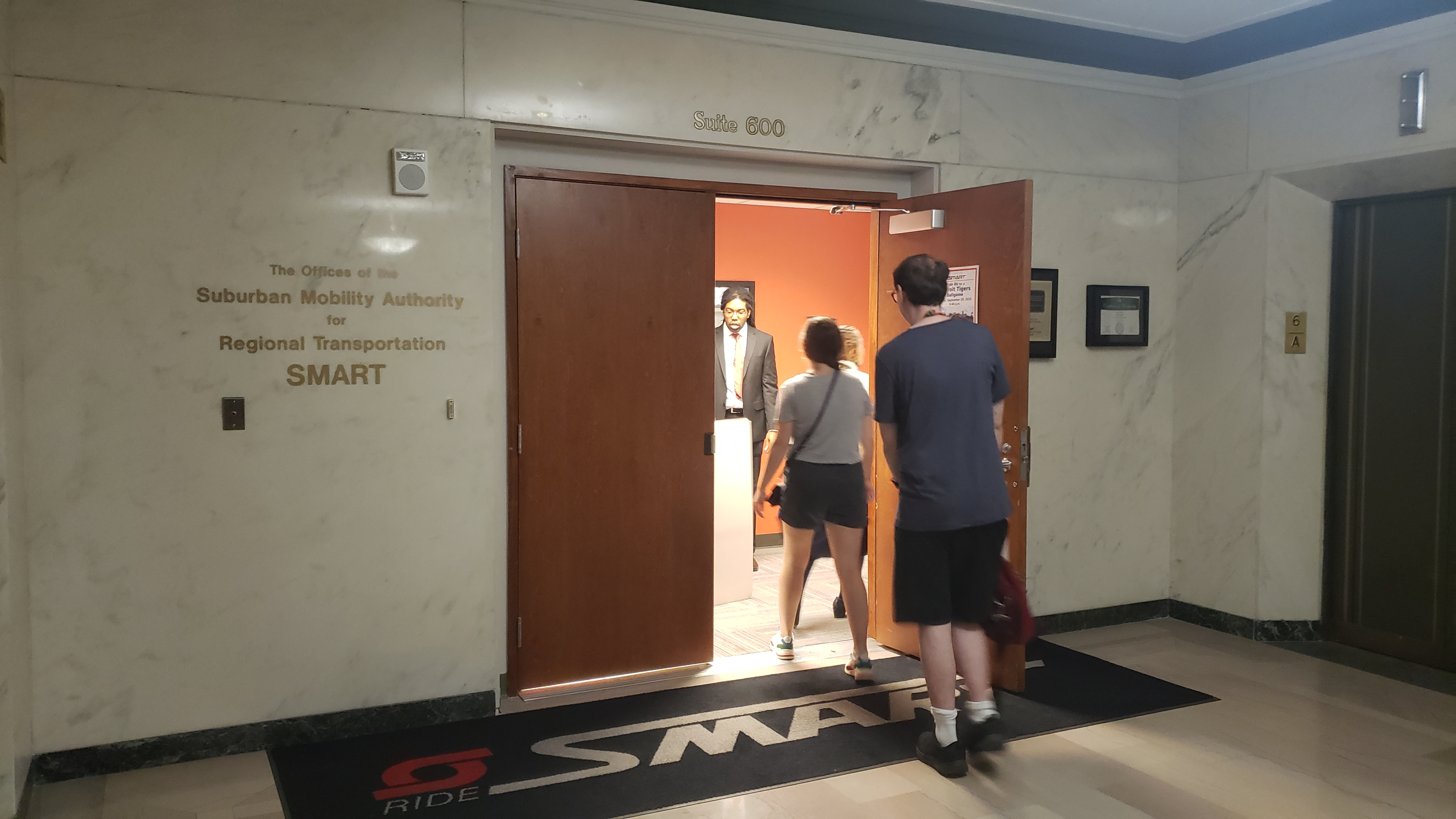
Entrance to SMART headquarters in Suite 600 of the Buhl Building

SMART is headquartered in the Buhl Building in downtown Detroit. It is governed by a seven-member Board of Directors, consisting of two members each from Wayne, Oakland and Macomb Counties, and one from Monroe County, appointed by their respective county executives.

=== Board of Directors members ===
Wayne County

- Assad Turfe, Deputy County Executive
- Curtis Ivery, Chancellor, Wayne County Community College District

Oakland County

- Diana McBroom, Director of Risk Management
- Eli Cooper, Transit Manager (vice chair)

Macomb County

- John Paul Rea, Deputy County Executive (chair)
- Sheila Cote, Director, Office of Senior Services

Monroe County

- Royce Maniko, former Chief Finance Officer

== Labor relations ==
The majority of SMART's workforce is unionized. Fixed-route bus drivers are represented by Amalgamated Transit Union Local 1564, Connector drivers by Teamsters Local 247, mechanics by UAW Local 771, and dispatchers and supervisors by AFSCME Local 1786.

The independent contractors employed by Via Transportation for SMART Flex, as well as SMART's salaried administrative staff, are not unionized.
