= Steinbach–Cookman Building =

- U.S. National Register of Historic Places
- U.S. Historic district – Contributing property
- New Jersey Register of Historic Places
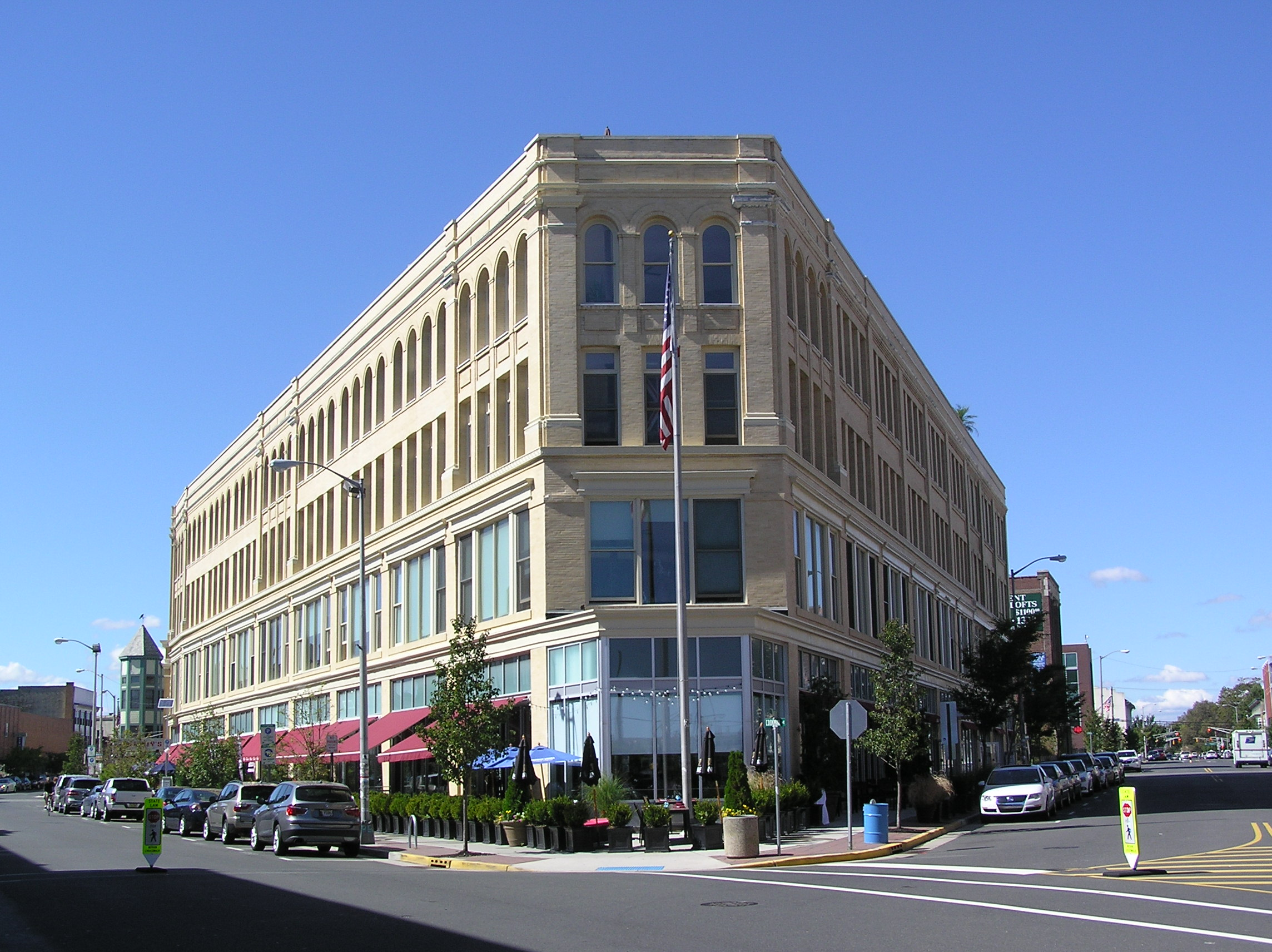

- Location within Monmouth County, New Jersey Location within New Jersey Location within the United States
- Location: Cookman Avenue, Asbury Park, New Jersey
- Coordinates: 40°12′59″N 74°00′37″W
- Built: 1896–1897
- Architectural style: Second Renaissance Revival
- Part of: Asbury Park Commercial Historic District (ID14000536)
- NRHP reference No.: 82003285
- NJRHP No.: 1957

Significant dates
- Added to NRHP: July 8, 1982
- Designated CP: September 30, 2014
- Designated NJRHP: March 19, 1982

The Steinbach–Cookman Building is located on Cookman Avenue in the city of Asbury Park in Monmouth County, New Jersey, United States. The historic commercial building was built from 1896 to 1897 and was added to the National Register of Historic Places on July 8, 1982, for its significance in architecture and commerce. The five story brick building features Second Renaissance Revival architecture. It was the flagship store of the Steinbach department store chain. It was listed as a contributing property of the Asbury Park Commercial Historic District on September 30, 2014.

== See also ==
- National Register of Historic Places listings in Monmouth County, New Jersey
