= Thunes =

Singapore-based financial technology company

- Type: Private
- Industry: Financial technology
- Predecessor: TransferTo
- Founded: 2016
- Headquarters: Singapore
- Number of locations: Atlanta, Barcelona, Beijing, Dubai, Hong Kong, Johannesburg, London, Manila, Nairobi, Paris, Riyadh, San Francisco, Singapore, Shanghai
- Area served: Worldwide
- Products: Cross-border payments, financial infrastructure
- Website: thunes.com

Thunes is a Singapore-based financial technology company that provides cross-border payment infrastructure for financial institutions, businesses, and payment providers. Its network enables transactions to digital wallets, bank accounts, stablecoin wallets and cash outlets. Thunes is also collaborating with Circle to enable cross-border settlements using the stablecoin USDC. Thunes is regulated as a ''Major Payment Institution'' by the Monetary Authority of Singapore.

== History ==
Thunes originated from TransferTo, a Singapore-based mobile payments company founded in 2005. In 2016, TransferTo was reorganized into two separate businesses: DT One, which continued to handle mobile top-ups and rewards, and Thunes, which focused on cross-border payments.

Later, Thunes expanded its payment network to support international transfers between banks, mobile wallets, and payment providers. In 2020, the company secured Series B funding led by Helios Investment Partners, with participation from Checkout.com and GGV Capital.

In 2021, Thunes acquired Limonetik, a Paris-based online payment platform. In April 2022, Thunes acquired a majority stake in the Singapore-based regtech startup Tookitaki, expanding its compliance and anti-money-laundering capabilities. The company has since secured additional funding, including a Series C in 2023 led by Marshall Wace and a Series D in 2024 led by Apis Partners and Vitruvian Partners to support its expansion in the United States and other markets.

In June 2025, the company announced the acquisition of Tilia, strengthening its global payments infrastructure and services.

Peter De Caluwe is chief executive officer and a co-founder.

== Operations and regulation ==
Thunes operates a global network that connects banks, payment service providers, merchants and mobile wallet operators to enable cross-border payments. Its platform supports various payout and collection methods and is used for remittances, e-commerce payments, and other financial transfers. The company enables interoperability between different payment systems, allowing them to exchange and process transactions.

The company's platform supports multiple payout and collection methods, and is used for remittances, e-commerce payments, and other financial transfers. Thunes is regulated as a ''Major Payment Institution'' by the Monetary Authority of Singapore and an Authorised Payment Institution by the UK's Financial Conduct Authority. It also holds a Payment institution License issued by Autorité de Contrôle Prudentiel et de Rèsolution (ACPR) in France and a ''Money Service Operator'' license in Hong Kong.

In the United States, Thunes obtained money transmitter licenses in 50 states.

In September 2025, it launched in Morocco and started cooperation with Ripple.

== Investors and partnerships ==
Thunes has received investment from several global firms, including Apis Partners, Vitruvian Partners, Marshall Wace, Bessemer Venture Partners, Helios Investment Partners, Checkout.com, and GGV Capital.

Some of these investors have also collaborated with Thunes to support the expansion of its payment network in emerging markets.

Thunes has also announced partnerships with Mastercard, Circle, Visa and PayPal. In October 2025, it partnered with Ecobank, pan-African banking conglomerate.
