= MC Sports =

Defunct American retailer

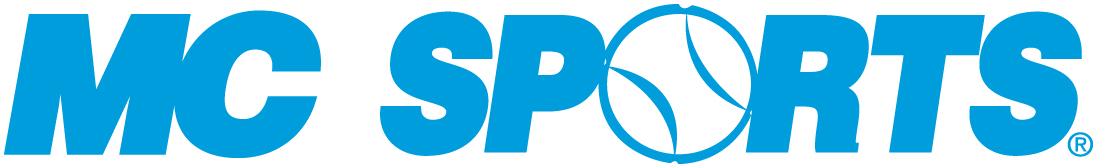
- Company type: Private
- Industry: Retail
- Founded: 1946 (80 years ago) as Michigan Clothiers; 1987; 39 years ago as MC Sports (Grand Rapids)
- Defunct: June 2017 (9 years ago)
- Fate: Chapter 7 bankruptcy Liquidation sale
- Headquarters: 3070 Shaffer SE; Grand Rapids, MI 49512
- Number of locations: 0 (as of June 2017)
- Key people: Bruce Ullery, President & CEO; Genevieve & Jack Finkelstein (Founders)
- Products: Apparel, sports equipment, footwear, exercise equipment
- Website: Archived official website at the Wayback Machine (archive index)

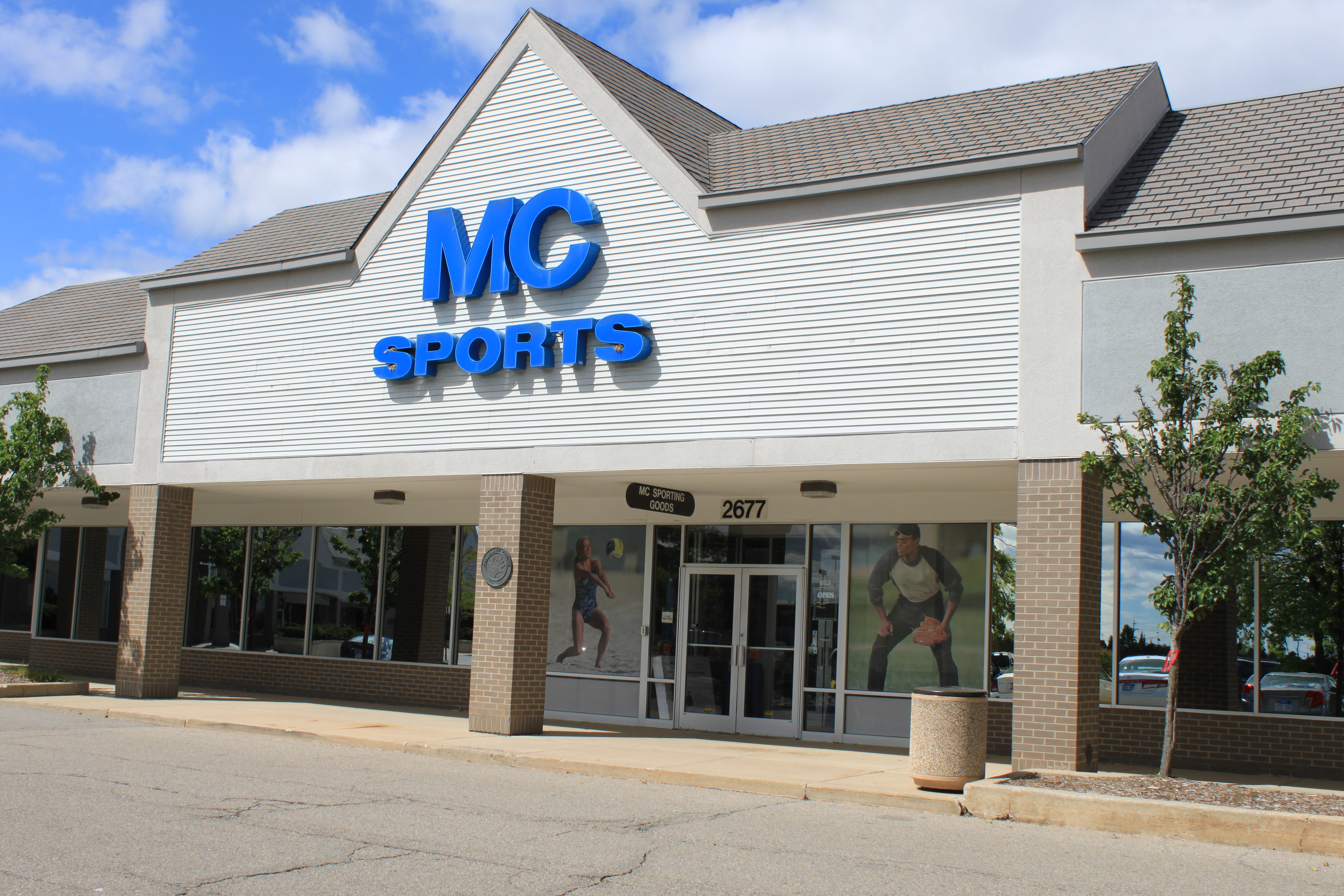
MC Sports store, Oak Valley SC, Ann Arbor, MI

MC Sports was an American retail sporting goods chain. Founded in Grand Rapids, Michigan in 1946, the chain operated 75 stores in the Midwestern United States before permanently closing in 2017 after filing for bankruptcy.

== History ==
MC Sports began in 1946 as Michigan Clothiers in Grand Rapids, Michigan. At this time, men's clothing had shared the shelving spaces with military surplus items. It was founded by Jack and Genevieve Finkelstein and later run by their three sons, Ed, Raleigh and Mort Finkelstein.

MC Sports switched its focus from clothing to sports equipment, footwear and apparel. In 1987, MC Sports accelerated its expansion through the acquisition of Morrie Mages' Sports, a three-store chain located in the Chicago area. A year later, Browns Sporting Goods was acquired adding 19 stores to its portfolio.

MC Sports had over 75 locations in Michigan, Ohio, Kansas, Illinois, Indiana, Wisconsin, Missouri, and Iowa. Amid competition from chains such as Sports Authority, MC Sports still retained a vast majority of their locations until the company's ultimate demise. At the time of its closure, the company was ranked as the 75th-largest retailer of sporting goods in the United States.

=== Charitable contributions ===
Every May, MC Sports promoted Miracle May; a month dedicated to helping charities within MC Sports communities. Each week in the month of May, a specific vendor item was advertised. Portions of these sales, and the proceeds from sponsorships and other business were donated to the Children's Miracle Network for each featured item.

=== Bankruptcy ===
The company announced that it would file for Chapter 11 bankruptcy in February 2017. It was ultimately converted to Chapter 7 liquidation. This plan was approved on February 16, and going-out-of-business sales at all 68 remaining stores began immediately thereafter. All stores closed by June 2017.

== See also ==
- List of defunct retailers of the United States
