= Macomb Mall =

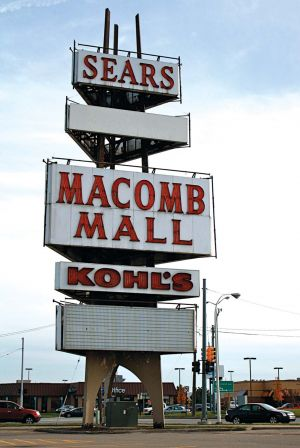
- Macomb Mall Sign in 2011
- Location: Roseville, Michigan, U.S.
- Coordinates: 42.5346°N 82.9167°W
- Opened: 1964
- Developer: Schostak Brothers
- Manager: Lormax Stern
- Num. of stores: approx. 60
- Num. of anchor tenants: 4
- Floor area: 933,000 square feet (86,700 m^{2})
- Floors: 1 (unused 2nd floor in former Sears)
- Public transit: SMART 525, 550, 560, 561, 615, 620
- Website: www.shopmacombmall.com

Macomb Mall is an enclosed shopping center located in Roseville, Michigan. Opened in 1964, it features Kohl's, Dick's Sporting Goods, Hobby Lobby, and At Home as anchor stores. The mall is managed by Lormax Stern.

== History ==
Macomb Mall was developed in 1964 by the Schostak Brothers of Detroit, Michigan. The mall opened with Sears, Crowley's, and Kresge as its anchor stores. The next year, a two-screen movie theater opened near Sears. An expansion completed in 1986 added a third anchor store, MainStreet (sold to Kohl's in 1989) and over 40 new stores. Old Navy was added as part of a 1999 renovation as the first Old Navy store in Macomb County. In 1999, Crowley's went bankrupt and sold its store to Value City.

Schostak continued to manage the mall until 2004, when it was put on the market. Thor Equities acquired the mall that year. Value City closed its store in March 2008.

In late 2011, Macomb Mall was almost closed due to the default on one of Thor Equities' loans. The property was sold to Cushman & Wakefield in 2011, and again to Lormax Stern in mid-2013.

In December 2013, Lormax Stern announced an $8 million renovation plan that would involve the demolition and reconstruction of the theater complex, as well as the demolition of the former Crowley's/Value City building for Dick's Sporting Goods. Ulta and Shoe Carnival were also confirmed as future tenants, followed by H&M in 2015. These changes shored up the mall and added new vitality to its operations, as the occupancy rate increased from about two-thirds to over 90%.

In April 2015, the movie theater, which had expanded to eight screens and become part of Silver Cinemas, closed, and was demolished the following year. Also in 2015, a new building was constructed near Dick's Sporting Goods, featuring new tenants, such as 1000 Degrees Neapolitan Pizza.

In 2015, Sears Holdings spun off 235 of its properties, including the Sears at Macomb Mall, into Seritage Growth Properties. On June 22, 2017, it was announced that the Sears in Macomb Mall would be closing. A portion of the store closed early and was converted into an At Home and the auto center was converted into DieHard. The remainder of the store closed on September 17, 2017.

In April 2019, it was announced that Hobby Lobby would open in the rest of the former Sears's first floor. The store opened in October of that year.

Plans to add a small food court next to Kohl's were shared in June 2020. The food court opened in December 2020 with Cinnabon, followed by China Max in June 2021.
