= Gateway Marketplace =

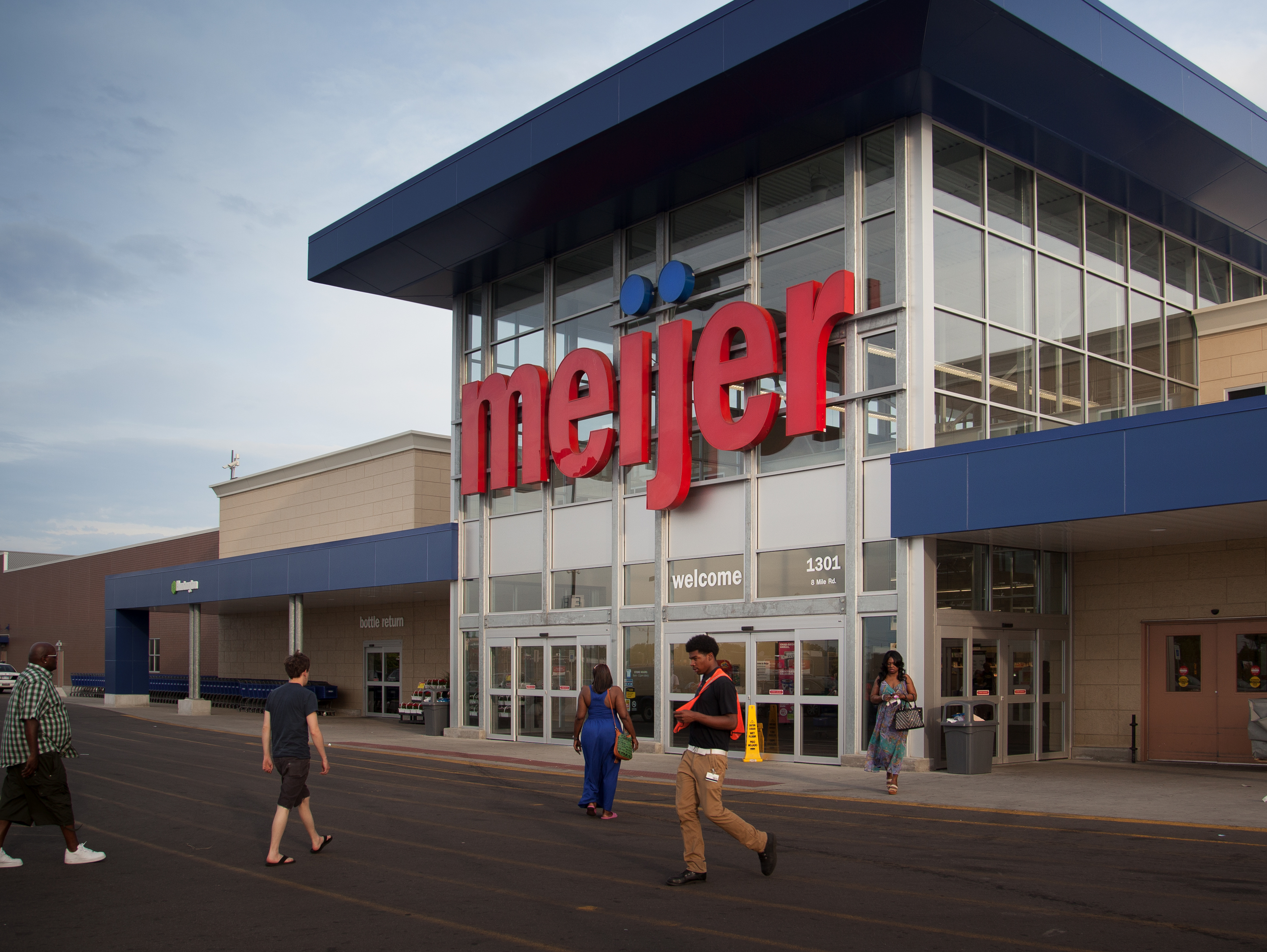
- The Meijer store at Gateway Marketplace
- Location: Detroit, Michigan
- Coordinates: 42.4453°N 83.1213°W
- Address: Woodward Avenue and 8 Mile Road
- Opened: July 25, 2013
- Developer: REDICO
- Manager: REDICO
- Owner: Detroit Gateway Park Outlet Mall, LLC
- Architect: Rogvoy Architects
- Num. of stores: 40
- Num. of anchor tenants: 3
- Floor area: 365,000 sq ft (33,900 m^{2})
- Floors: 1
- Public transit: DDOT 17, 23 from Jason Hargrove Transit Center: DDOT 4, 12, 30, 54; SMART 405, 450, 460, 461, 462, 492, 494, 495

Gateway Marketplace is a power center in Detroit, Michigan. The complex is located at the southeast corner of 8 Mile Road (M-102) and Woodward Avenue (M-1), adjacent to the Jason Hargrove Transit Center and near the former site of the Michigan State Fair complex. The complex contains around forty inline tenants on its 35 acres (140,000 m^{2}).

== Development ==
Gateway Marketplace (originally planned as The Shoppes at Gateway Park) is an outdoor shopping mall with approximately 330,000 square feet (30,658.0 m^{2}) of retail space. Originally, construction on the property was slated to begin in March 2007; Chicago, Illinois-based General Growth Properties, the mall's developer, later delayed groundbreaking on the mall until early 2008, in order to secure the interest of prospective tenants. In 2008, General Growth Properties withdrew from the project.

Gateway Marketplace was then developed by REDICO, a Michigan-based commercial real estate firm. REDICO also acts as property manager of the retail complex.

REDICO's Gateway Marketplace won a CREW Impact Award for New Construction in 2014.

JCPenney signed a letter of interest in March 2007 to be included as an anchor store of the complex. This JCPenney would have been the first full-line department store within Detroit's city limits since the closure of a Crowley's near downtown in 1999. JCPenney's plans to open a store at the site fell through in 2008 when the national retailing landscape began to suffer from a credit crunch and dwindling shopper dollars.

At a December 2007 meeting, Detroit City Council members held a meeting to approve a special tax status regarding the mall's construction. In April 2008, Marshalls indicated interest in the development. The mall project was later pushed back to mid-2008 due to a lack of confirmed tenants, and has been further delayed since.

In August 2009, the Meijer chain announced it would open its first store with the city limits of Detroit at the $90 Million Shoppes at Gateway Park. Two other stores including HomeGoods also announced they have signed on to share the 40,000 square feet (3,700 m^{2}) designed for the mall's secondary anchor. The mall was scheduled to open in 2011. Late in the year, the project was renamed Gateway Marketplace. REDICO began development in early 2012.

Meijer opened on July 25, 2013. Other tenants include K&G, Marshalls, Payless, Applebees, AT&T, Edible Arrangements, Planet Fitness, Five Below, Footlocker, McDonald's, Metro PCS, Mr. Alan's Elite, Petco, PNC Bank, Rainbow, Starbucks, Subway, SVS Vision, Wingstop and others.
