= Michigan State Fair Riding Coliseum, Dairy Cattle Building, and Agricultural Building =

- U.S. National Register of Historic Places
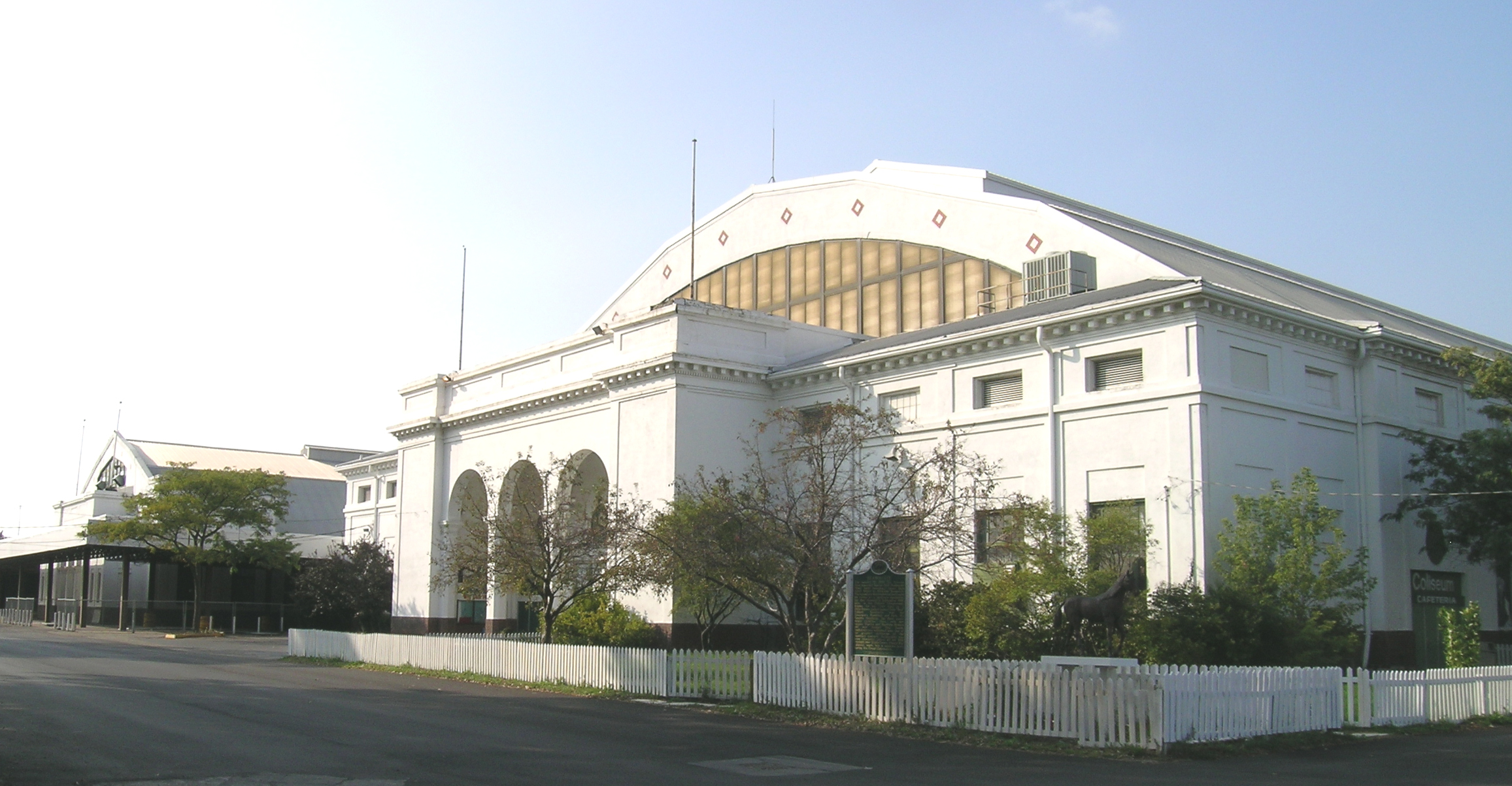
- Coliseum and Agricultural Building at the Michigan State Fair, 2008

- Location within Michigan Location within the United States
- Interactive map
- Location: Michigan State Fairgrounds, Detroit, Michigan
- Coordinates: 42°26′36″N 83°7′3″W
- Area: 4 acres (1.6 ha)
- Built: 1922
- Architect: Lynn W. Fry
- Architectural style: Roman Classical
- NRHP reference No.: 80001925
- Added to NRHP: June 6, 1980

The Michigan State Fair Riding Coliseum, Dairy Cattle Building, and Agricultural Building are three buildings located on the grounds of the Michigan State Fair in Detroit, Michigan. They were listed on the National Register of Historic Places in 1980.

== History ==
The Michigan State Fair, first held in 1849, was the nation's first state fair. It was held in various locations throughout Michigan until 1904, when Joseph L. Hudson formed the State Fair Land Company, acquired 135 acres of land at this site, and deeded it to the Michigan Agricultural Society. The 1905 Michigan State Fair was held on this site. In 1921, the Michigan Agricultural Society turned the land and the operation of the fair over to the state of Michigan.

The Riding Coliseum, Dairy Cattle Building, and Agricultural Building were likely designed by the same architect, Lynn W. Fry of the State Building Department. The three buildings were constructed in two year intervals in 1922, 1924, and 1926.

The Michigan State Fair was held on this site until 2008. It was not held the following two years, and then moved to another location. On April 9, 2012, Governor Rick Snyder signed Senate Bill 515 and House Bill 4803, which would authorize the transfer of the fairgrounds land to the Land Bank Fast Track Authority, which would oversee the land for future development, including plans for a station for the proposed commuter rail service. As of 2016, plans are underway for redevelopment of the entire site, including these buildings.

In August 2020, 142 acre site was sold to Detroit-based Sterling Group and Dallas-based Hillwood Enterprises LP for a reported $9 million, $2 million more than the city paid for the site in April of that year. When the sale was announced, it was also announced that Amazon would occupy a 3.8 million square foot, $400 million distribution center on 78 acres of the site. The development team would also pay $7 million towards a new transit center on the site that would serve DDOT and SMART buses.

Originally, all historic buildings were intended to be torn down from the development, but after concerns from preservationist and transit advocates, a new plan was put forth to partially spare the buildings. In the new plan, the Dairy Cattle Building is set to be converted to a bus station and transit center, while the Coliseum portico would be saved as part of an outdoor public event space. Further, the Band Shell (nearby, but not part of this group of buildings) would be disassembled and moved to nearby Palmer Park.

== Description ==
The Dairy Cattle Building, the Coliseum, and the Agricultural Building are located near each other together in the center of the State Fairgrounds. All three are similar in appearance, being Neo-Classical Revival, white stuccoed buildings sitting on high red brick foundations. They are fine examples of the Classically inspired exhibition architecture popularized by the World Fair exhibitions of the nineteenth and twentieth centuries.

=== Agricultural Building ===
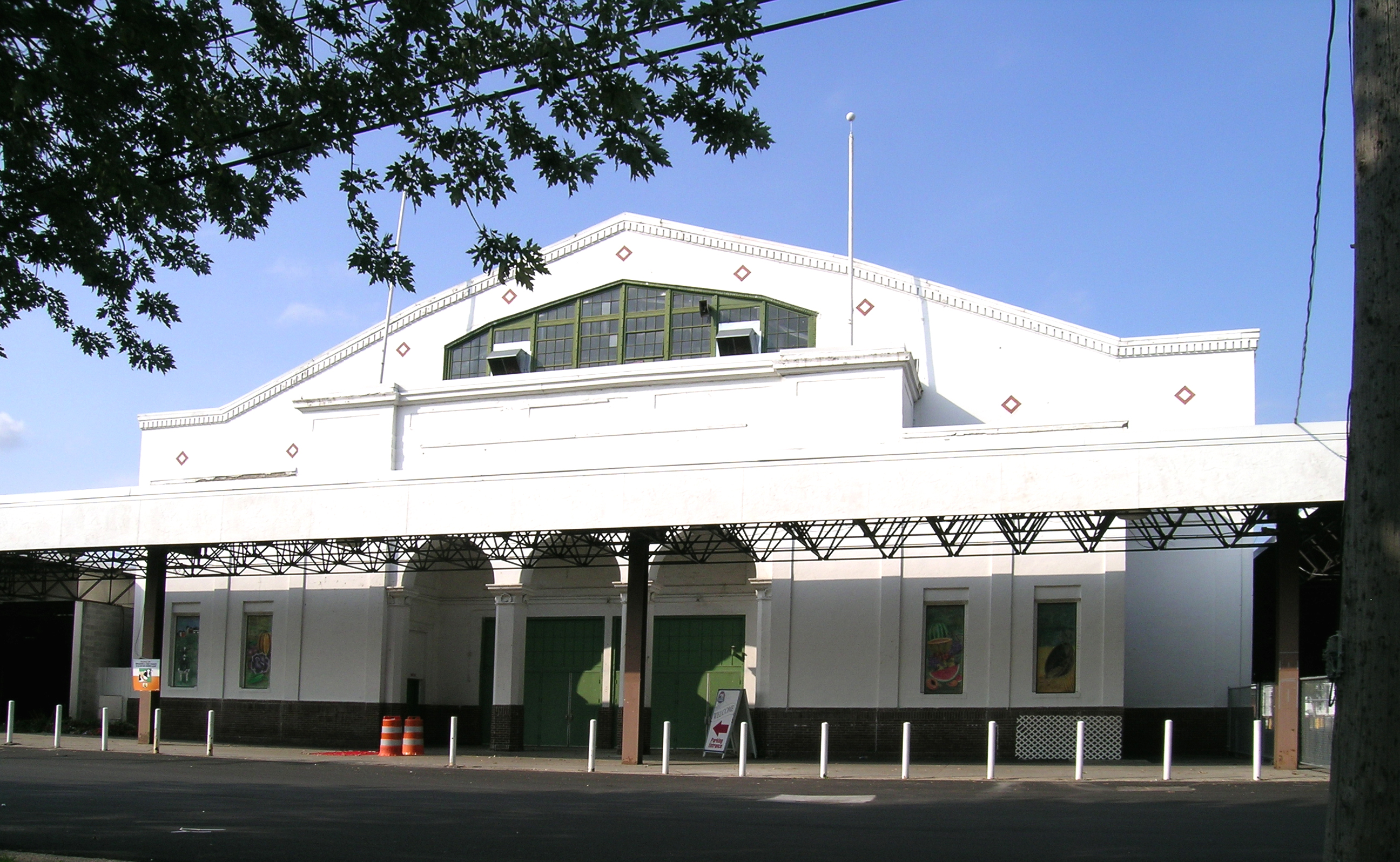
Agricultural Building, 2008

The Agriculture Building, built in 1926, is a long one-story structure with a tall curved roof, the gable end of which is concealed behind a stuccoed parapet on the front facade. It has two entrances, one each on the front and side, which are sheltered by projecting arcades with a denticulated cornice. The walls are separated into shallow panels. The interior houses only a single large utilitarian space.

=== Riding Coliseum ===
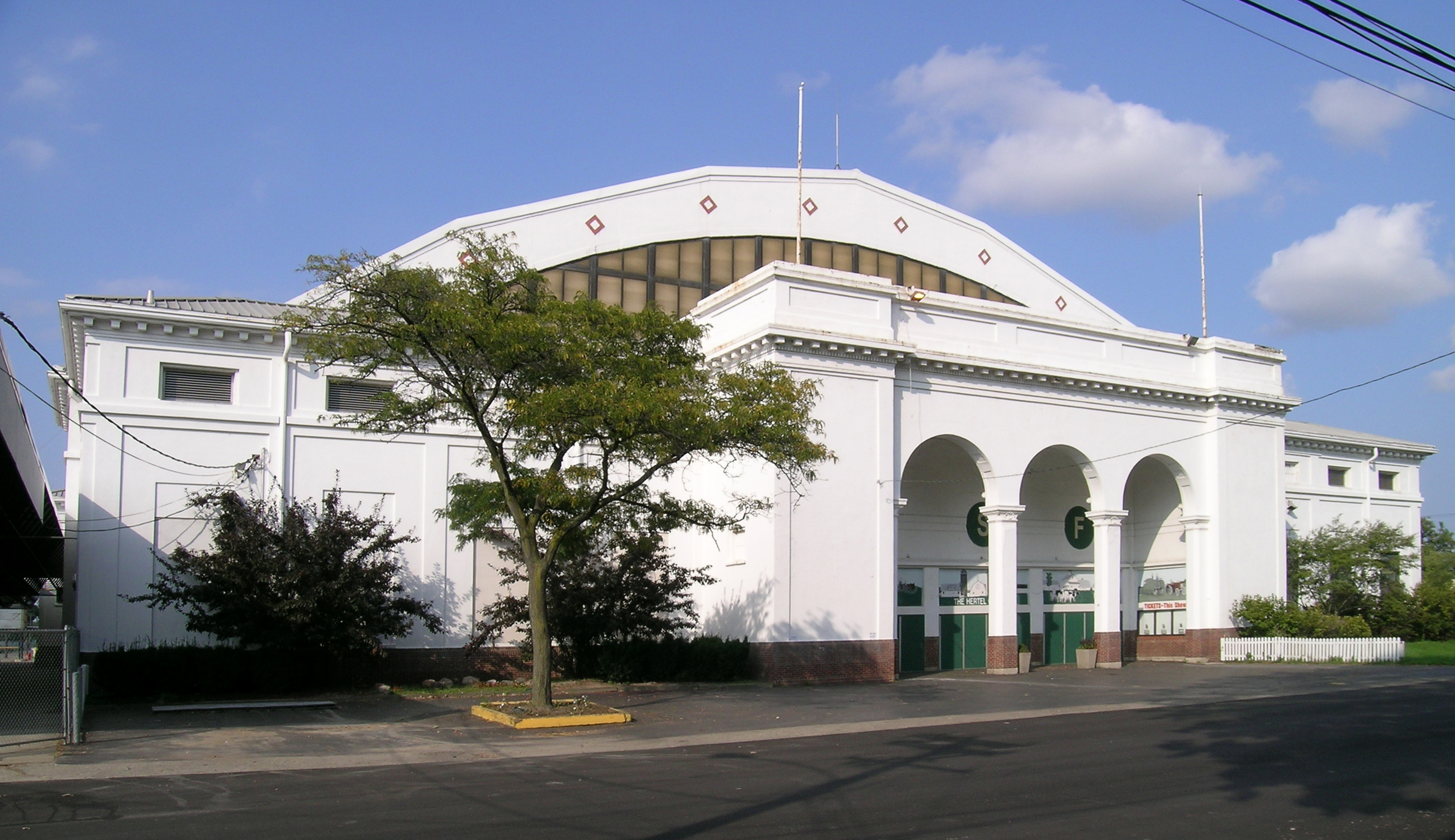
Riding Coliseum, 2008

The Coliseum, constructed in 1922, is similar in general design to the Agricultural Building, with paneled stucco walls, projecting arcades, and a denticulated cornice. The building footprint is 420 feet by 225 feet, and it contains a 264 feet by 124 feet riding arena encircled with a seating area. The Coliseum is constructed with an unusual "rain-bo" steel truss roof, which is one of the largest trussed structures in the Detroit area.

=== Dairy Cattle Building ===
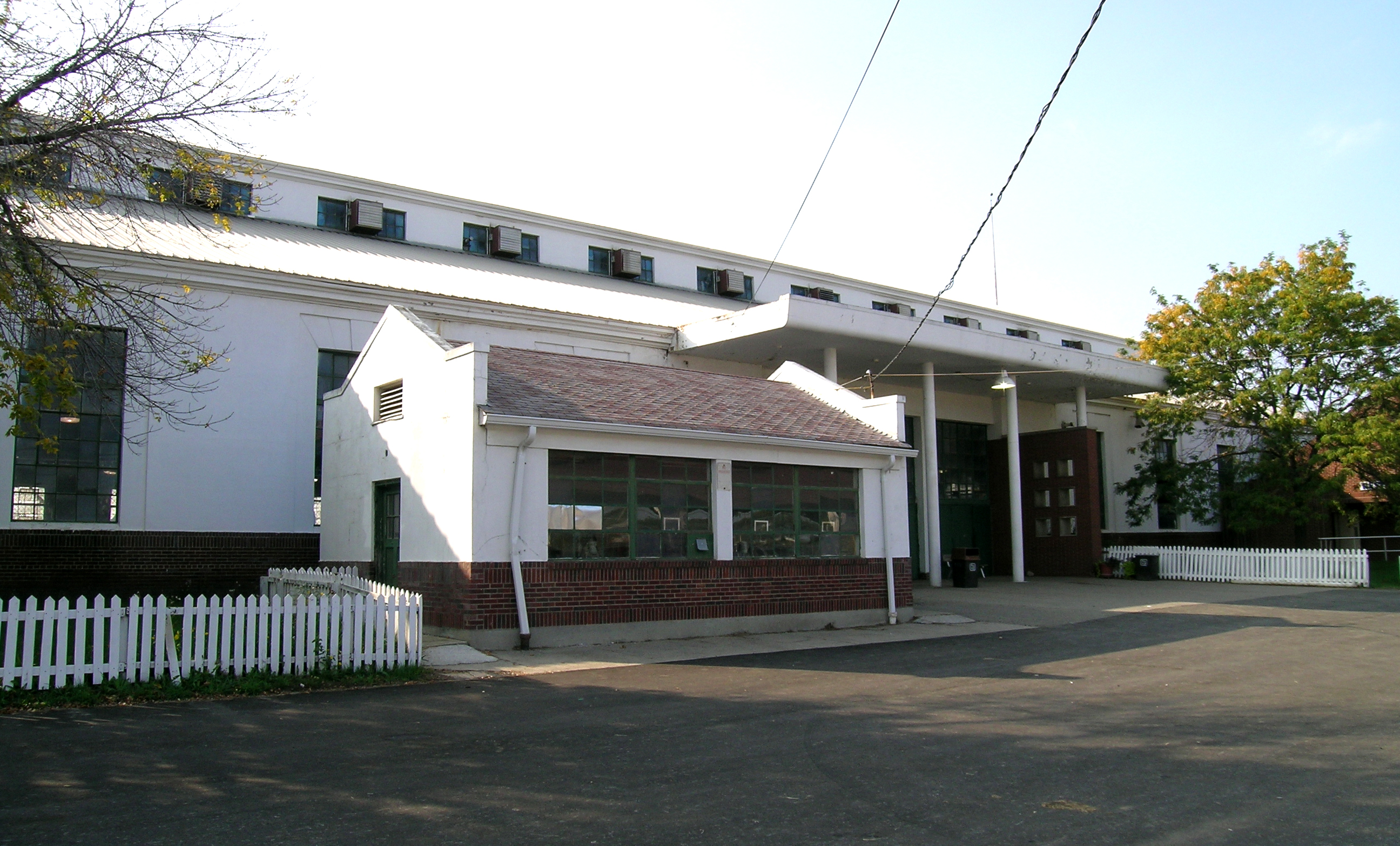
Dairy Cattle Building, 2008

The Dairy Cattle Building, built in 1924, is constructed as a rear extension to the Coliseum, and is similar to the other two buildings. It is a monitor-roofed, basilican-plan building with a modern brick-and-steel entrance constructed in the 1950s on one side. Like the Agricultural Building, the interior consists only of a single large space.

The Dairy Cattle Building was selected as the site of a new bus station at the State Fairgrounds site in 2021, succeeding a temporary bus terminal near the site. The State Fairgrounds site, located at the Detroit city limits, has been a major transportation hub since the era of streetcars, when a streetcar loop was located on the site. The final streetcars were replaced by buses in 1956, and the fairgrounds continued to serve as a bus transfer point. Construction on the Dairy Cattle Building for conversion to a bus station began in May 2023, and the terminal opened a year later in May 2024. The Jason Hargrove Transit Center, named after late DDOT driver and COVID-19 safety activist Jason Hargrove, features retail space, a drivers' lounge, and a ticket window for bus passengers.

== See also ==
- National Register of Historic Places listings in Detroit, Michigan
