= Jason Hargrove Transit Center =

Major public transit station in Detroit, Michigan

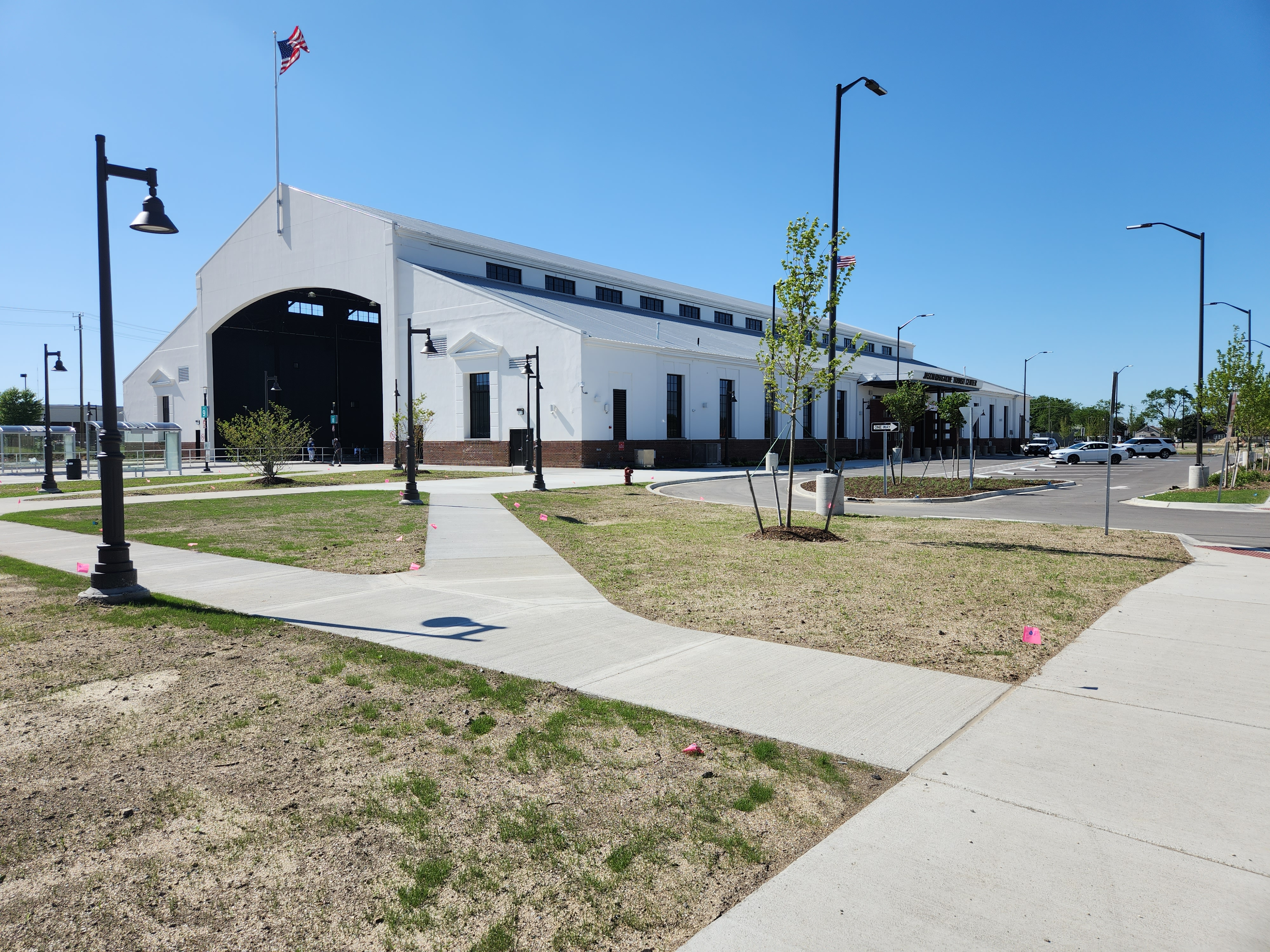

General information
- Location: 1121 8 Mile Road; Detroit, Michigan; United States
- Coordinates: 42°26′36″N 83°07′0.52″W
- Owner: City of Detroit
- Operator: DDOT
- Bus routes: 13
- Bus stands: 11
- Bus operators: DDOT; SMART

Construction
- Structure type: At-grade
- Cycle facilities: MoGo Bikeshare
- Accessible: Yes
- Architect: Lynn W. Fry (original building); NORR (adaptive reuse)

Other information
- Website: detroitmi.gov/departments/detroit-department-transportation/jason-hargrove-transit-center

History
- Opened: May 11, 2024
- Michigan State Fair Riding Coliseum, Dairy Cattle Building, and Agricultural Building
- U.S. National Register of Historic Places
- Built: 1924
- NRHP reference No.: 80001925
- Added to NRHP: June 6, 1980
Location

The Jason Hargrove Transit Center (JHTC) is a major public transit station in Detroit, Michigan, United States. It is the third iteration of the State Fair Transit Center, located at the old Michigan State Fairgrounds, near Gateway Marketplace and the intersection of 8 Mile Road and Woodward Avenue. It serves as the secondary hub for the Detroit Department of Transportation bus network, as well as a major transfer point for the suburban SMART network, served by 13 bus routes in total.

The JHTC is an adaptive reuse project designed by NORR, housed in the former Dairy Cattle Building, the last remaining structure from the Michigan State Fair at the site. The remainder of the State Fair site has been redeveloped for retail and industrial uses.

== Services ==
Services from the transit center include 13 bus routes, 10 of which terminate at the station. As of May 2024, the transit center is expected to serve 25,000 passengers per week.

Services from the Jason Hargrove Transit Center
Operator	Route	Direction	Destination
DDOT	4 Woodward	Southbound	Downtown Detroit
DDOT	12 Conant	Southbound	Belle Isle
DDOT	17 Eight Mile	Eastbound	Ascension St. John Hospital
DDOT	17 Eight Mile	Westbound	Northland Center
DDOT	30 Livernois	Southbound	Southwest Detroit, Jefferson & Brennan
DDOT	54 Wyoming	Southbound	Southwest Detroit, Jefferson & West End
SMART	405 Northwestern Highway	Westbound	Henry Ford West Bloomfield Hospital
SMART	450 Woodward Local	Northbound	Phoenix Center, Pontiac
SMART	460 Woodward Local	Northbound	Somerset Collection
SMART	461 FAST Woodward	Northbound	Troy Civic Center
SMART	462 FAST Woodward	Northbound	Great Lakes Crossing
SMART	461 FAST Woodward	Southbound	Downtown Detroit
SMART	462 FAST Woodward	Southbound	Downtown Detroit
SMART	492 Rochester	Northbound	Oakland University
SMART	494 Dequindre	Northbound	Beaumont Hospital, Troy
SMART	495 John R	Northbound	Oakland Mall

== History ==
=== Fairgrounds ===
The Michigan State Fairgrounds, an approximately 160-acre (65 ha) site at 8 Mile Road and Woodward Avenue, hosted the annual Michigan State Fair from 1905 to 2009. The fair went on hiatus in 2009 amidst funding difficulties, and returned in 2012 at the Suburban Collection Showplace. During the administration of Michigan Governor Rick Snyder, the northwestern portion of the site was redeveloped into a shopping center, anchored by a Meijer store. Additional redevelopment proposals were made in the late 2010s, and much of the site was redeveloped for industrial uses by 2023.

The redevelopment of the State Fairgrounds was controversial. Following the construction of the shopping center, the proposals to redevelop the rest of the site for industrial use were met with resistance. Preservationists highlighted the historic value of the buildings on the site, which included the Michigan State Fairgrounds Coliseum, the Dairy Cattle Building, and a historic band shell. In 2021, the plans for the State Fairgrounds redevelopment were revised, which included retaining the Dairy Cattle Building as a new transit center and relocating the band shell to Palmer Park. The Coliseum was demolished in 2022.

=== Transit center ===
The original State Fair Transit Center, located at what is now the corner of Woodward Avenue and Remington Street, had existed since the era of the Department of Street Railways, and was once served by streetcars. Construction at the Fairgrounds site required a new access street, and the original Transit Center closed permanently on November 6, 2022, with only one week of public notice, and was demolished soon thereafter. A new, temporary transit center entered service the next day.

Construction on the new transit center began in May 2023, with extensive interior demolition of the Dairy Cattle Building. The station features a heated indoor lobby, with a ticket office and vending machine, public restrooms, and artifacts preserved from the Coliseum, including a sign, stadium seats, and a scoreboard.

== Namesake ==
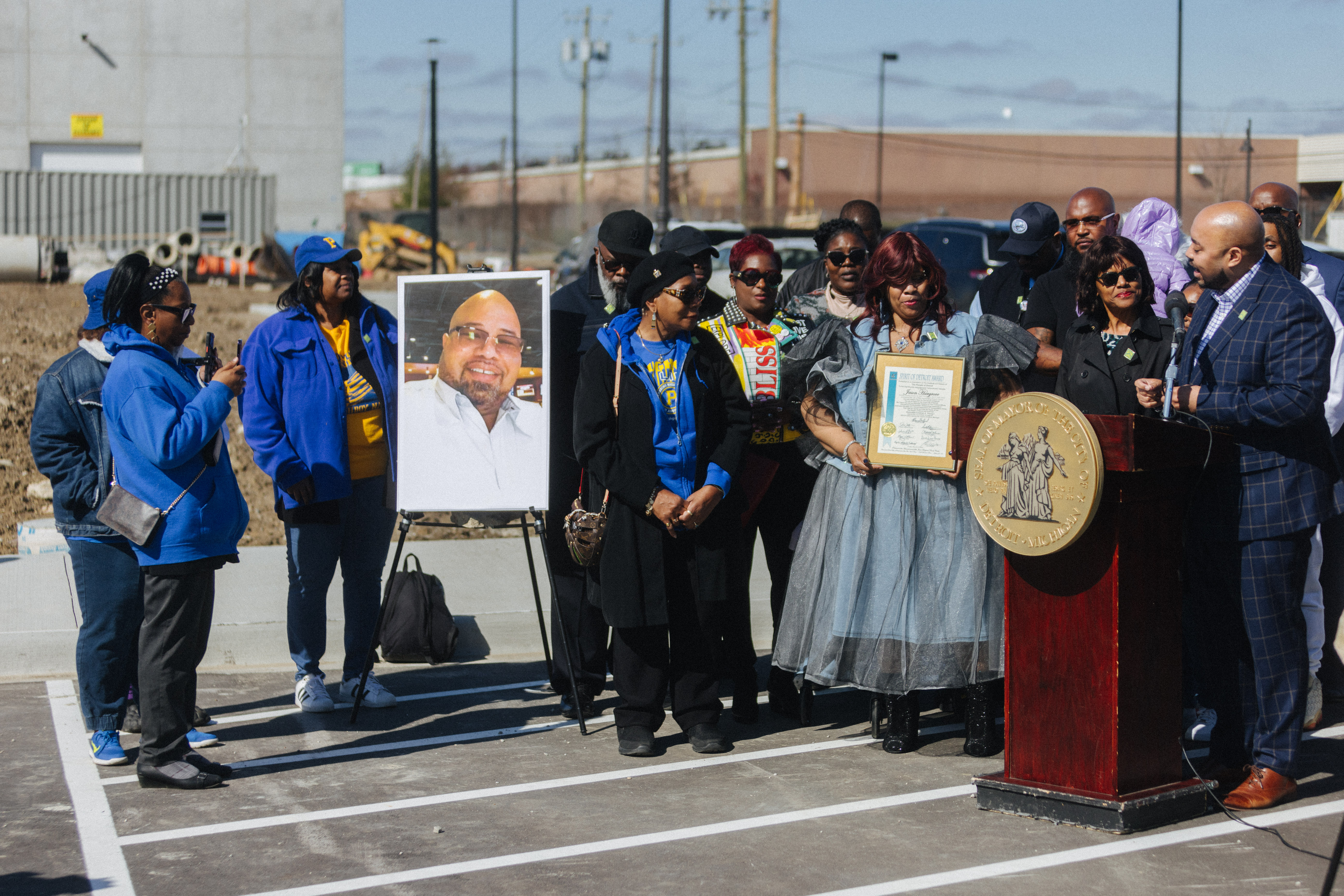
Detroit City Council member Fred Durhall III speaks at the transit center dedication ceremony, with Desha Johnson-Hargrove holding the Spirit of Detroit Award

The transit center is named for DDOT bus driver Jason Hargrove, who died on April 1, 2020 from complications of COVID-19. Hargrove, a father of six, had worked for DDOT since 2016, and was an active member of the Amalgamated Transit Union.

Hargrove gained national attention from a viral video he posted on Facebook on March 21, 2020, in which he described being coughed on by a careless passenger, and advocated for stronger protections for DDOT bus drivers in the then-early stages of the COVID-19 pandemic. Hargrove's video was the subject of national media coverage, highlighting the serious nature of the COVID-19 crisis, and its effect on frontline workers. In a letter to the editor in Time published on April 8, Hargrove's widow Desha Johnson-Hargrove pleaded with the public to honor his legacy by staying at home during the crisis.

The new transit center was dedicated to Hargrove in a ceremony in March 2024. Hargrove was posthumously awarded the Spirit of Detroit Award at the ceremony, which was attended by DDOT and city leadership and Hargrove's family.
