= Lynn W. Fry =

American architect (1894–1967)

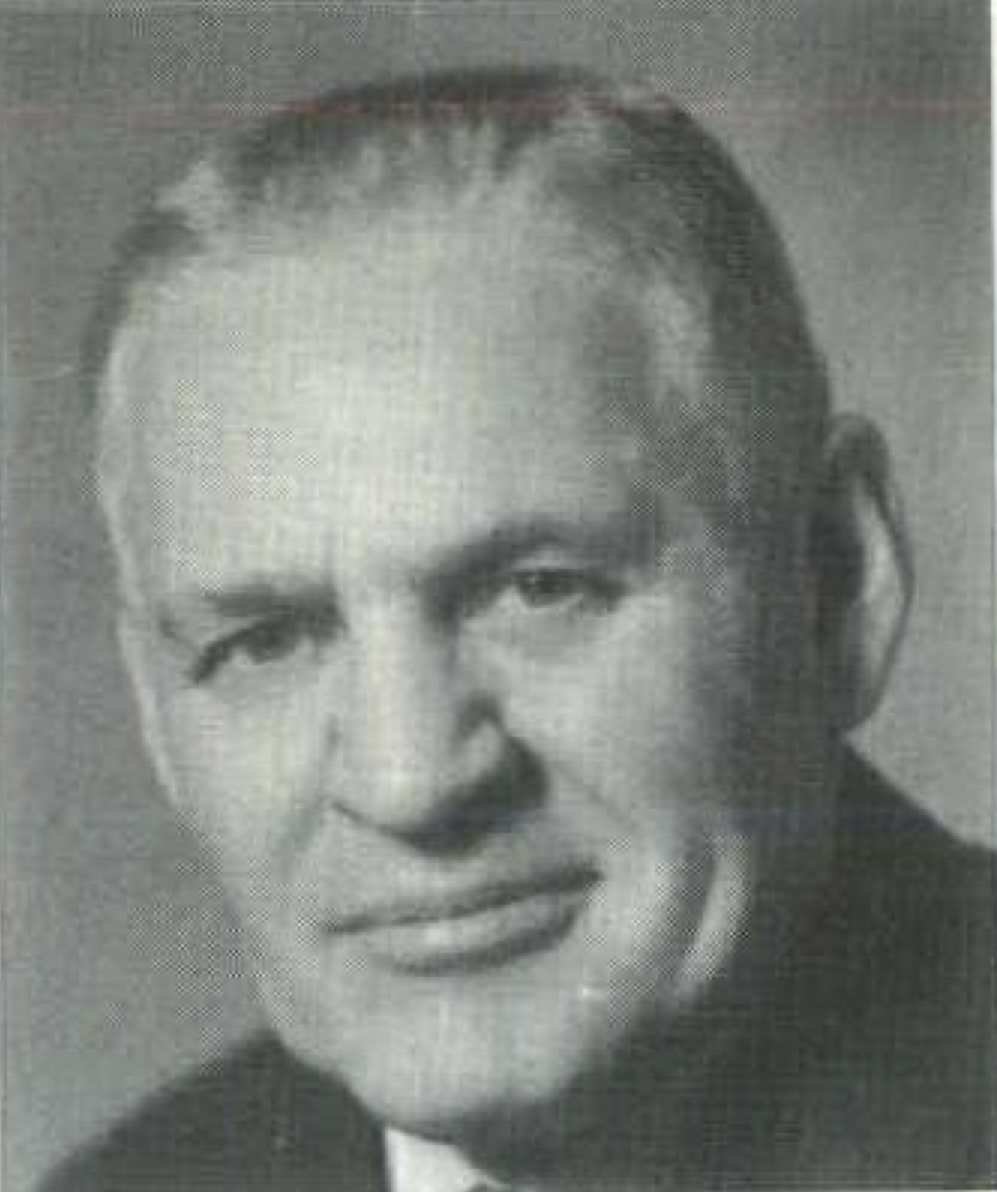
- Portrait, ca. 1967
- Born: Lynn Ward Fry; November 9, 1894; Grand Rapids, Michigan
- Died: February 20, 1967 (aged 72); Ann Arbor, Michigan
- Occupation: Architect

Lynn Ward Fry (November 9, 1894 – February 20, 1967) was an American architect. Fry was active in Michigan for his entire life, operating the architectural firm of Fry & Kasurin in Ann Arbor from the 1920s through the 1940s. Fry served as the University Architect for the University of Michigan and the State Architect for Michigan, and his designs are seen around the state.

== Biography ==
Lynn Ward Fry was born in Grand Rapids, Michigan on November 9, 1894. He graduated from the University of Michigan in 1917 with a Bachelor of Science in architecture, and served in France during World War I. After his military service, he returned to Michigan, where he was appointed State Architect. In this capacity, he designed civic buildings built by the state of Michigan, including multiple buildings of the State Fairgrounds in Detroit and five National Guard armories across the state.

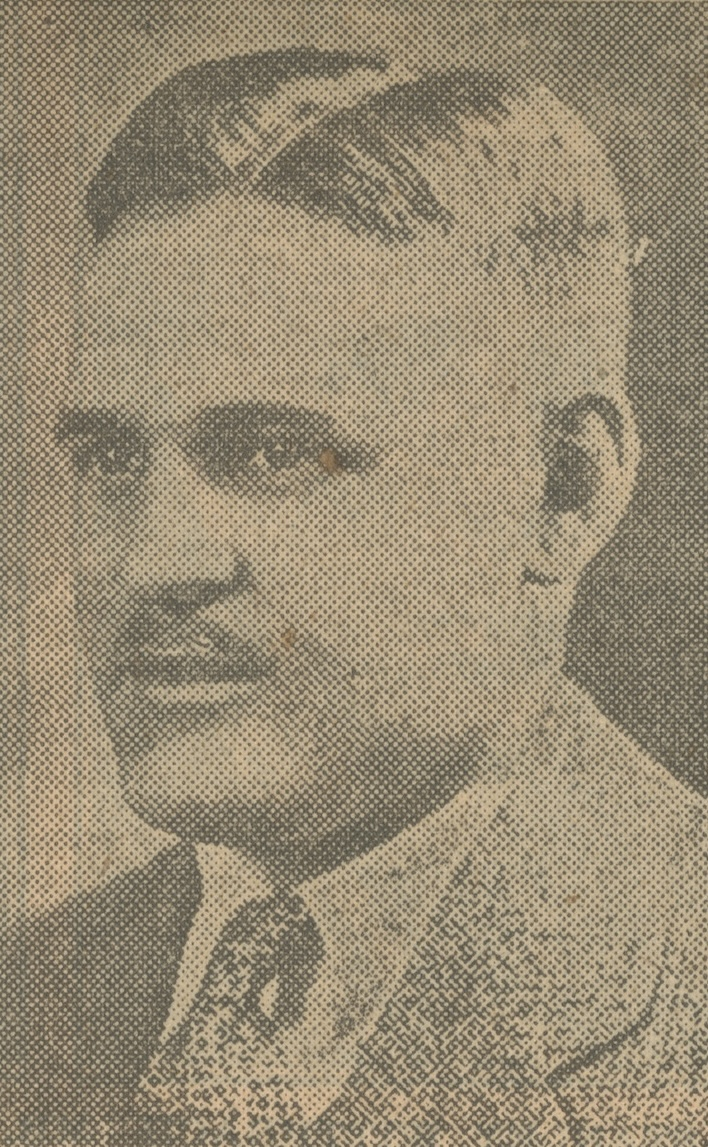
Fry in 1928

Fry left his position as state architect in the late 1920s, and formed the architectural firm of Fry & Kasurin in Ann Arbor, in association with Finnish-American architect Paul Kasurin. Fry was responsible for the firm's engineering, and Kasurin was the chief designer. The firm specialized in civic and commercial buildings, and was active in Washtenaw County until the 1940s.

Fry was hired by the University of Michigan in 1945 as its Supervisor of Plant Extension, and was awarded the position of University Architect in 1957. Fry advocated for the university to hire well-known architects to design new buildings in contemporary styles, and implemented new administrative processes to supervise their work. During his tenure as University Architect, Fry was a founder of the Association of University Architects. The first AUA conference was held at Michigan in 1956, and the association now represents university architects across the United States and Canada.

Fry was a member of the American Institute of Architects, and served on the board of directors of the Michigan Society of Architects. Fry retired from the University of Michigan in 1965. After his retirement, Fry worked as a consultant for the University of Toledo and an architecture firm in Birmingham, Michigan. He died at his home in Ann Arbor on February 20, 1967.

== Personal life ==
Fry married Ines A. Hayes of Ann Arbor in 1919. They had two children.

== Designs ==
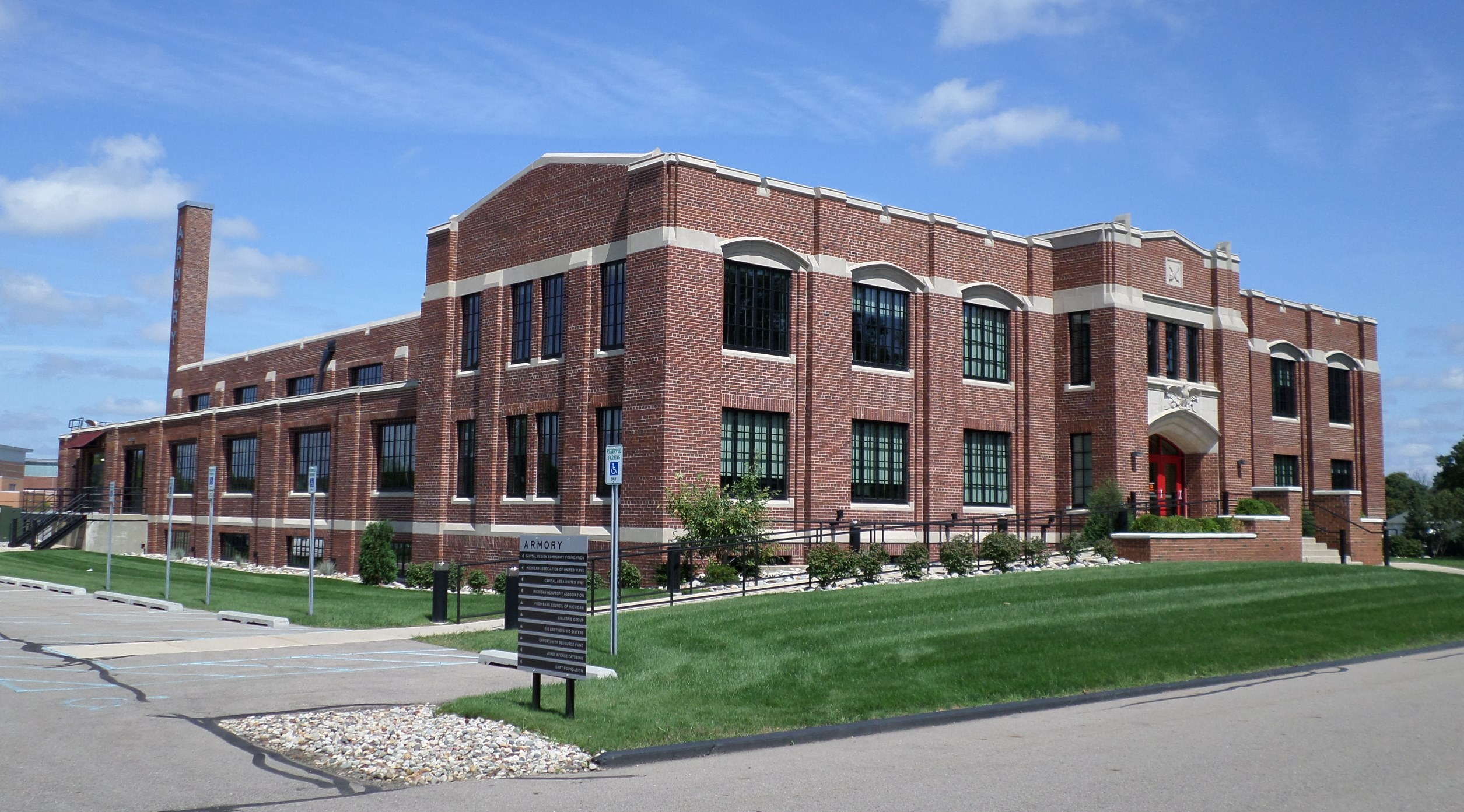
The 1924 Marshall Street Armory in Lansing is an example of Fry's work as State Architect

Fry's designs are seen across the state of Michigan. As State Architect, he designed five National Guard armories, including the National Register of Historic Places-listed Marshall Street Armory in Lansing.

Fry's designs for the Michigan State Fairgrounds in Detroit include the NRHP-listed State Fairgrounds Coliseum, Dairy Cattle Building, and Agricultural Building. The State Fair was held in Detroit until 2009, and the fairgrounds were redeveloped into industrial and retail space beginning in the 2010s. Most of the fairgrounds buildings, including the Coliseum and the Agricultural Building, were demolished for the redevelopment. The Dairy Cattle Building was extensively remodeled as the Jason Hargrove Transit Center.

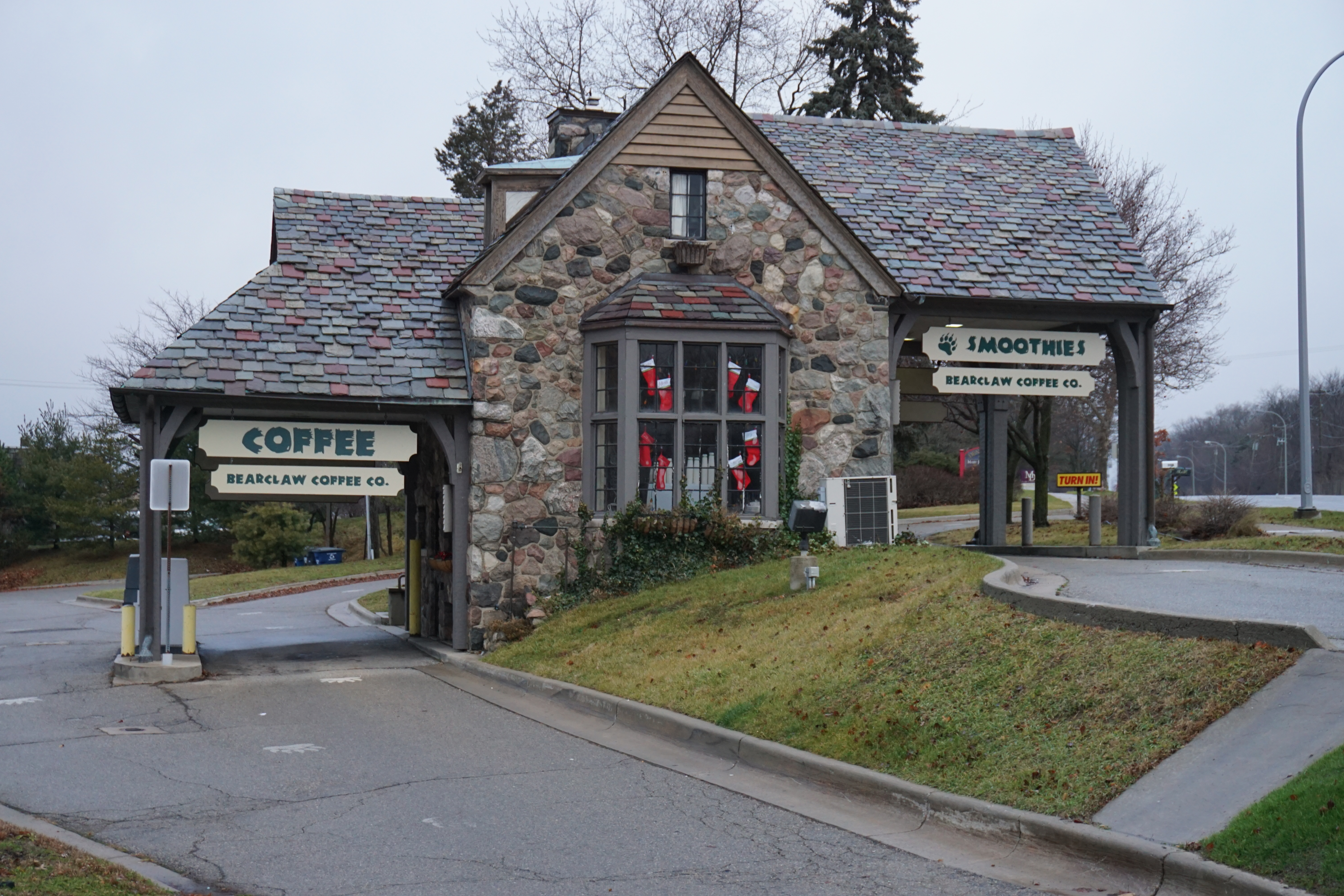
The Tuomy Hills Service Station in Ann Arbor, an example of Fry's work with Kasurin

The firm of Fry & Kasurin was active in Washtenaw County, specializing in commercial and civic buildings. Its notable designs include Slauson Middle School and Angell Elementary School of Ann Arbor Public Schools, and the NRHP-listed First National Bank Building and Tuomy Hills Service Station.
