= Tuomy Hills Service Station =

- U.S. National Register of Historic Places
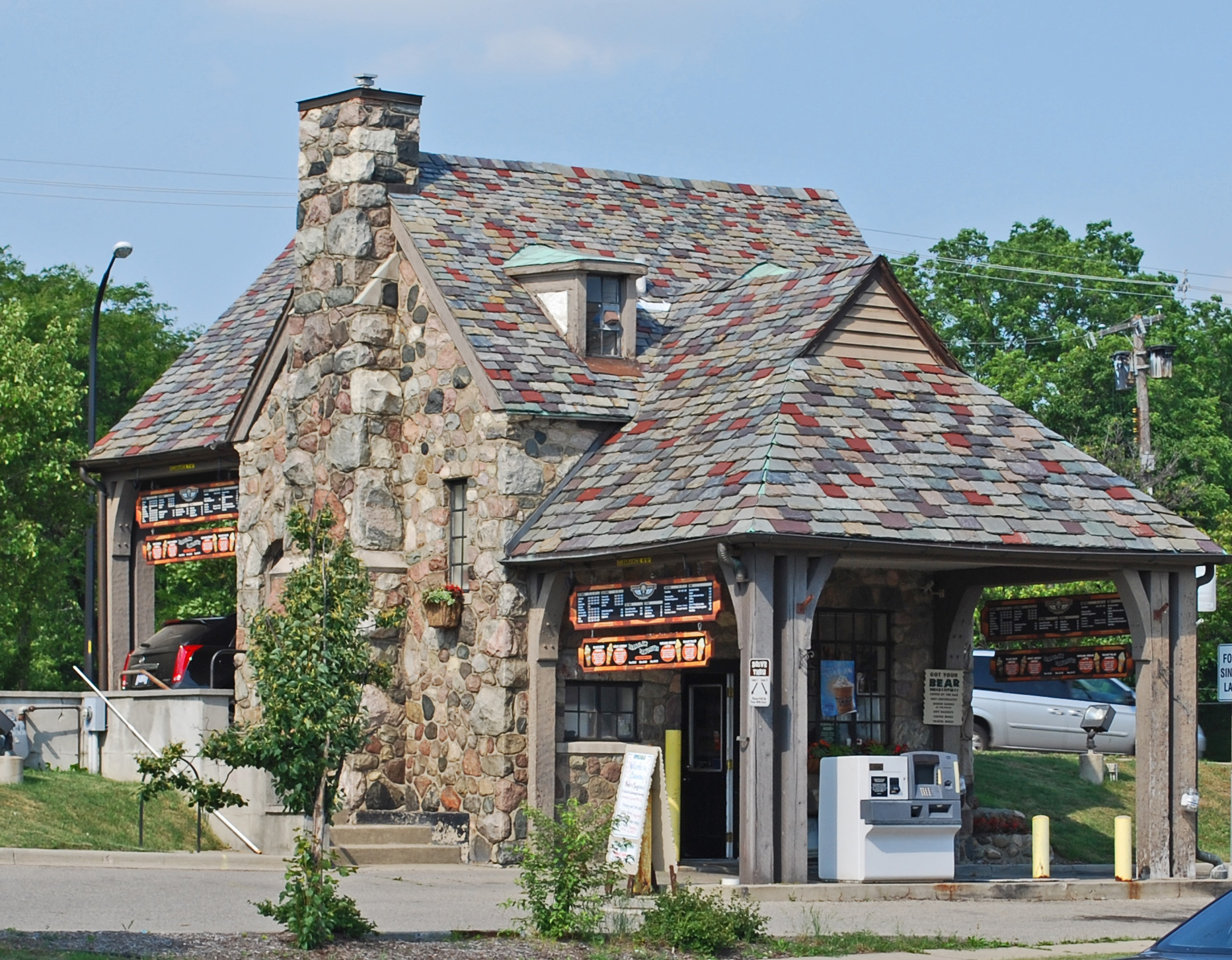

- Location within Michigan Location within the United States
- Interactive map
- Location: 2460 Washtenaw Ave., Ann Arbor, Michigan
- Coordinates: 42°15′34″N 83°42′44″W
- Area: less than one acre
- Built: 1928
- Architect: Fry & Kasurin; Paul Kasurin
- Architectural style: Tudor Revival
- NRHP reference No.: 00000240
- Added to NRHP: March 24, 2000

The Tuomy Hills Service Station is a commercial building located at 2460 Washtenaw Avenue in Ann Arbor, Michigan. It was listed on the National Register of Historic Places in 2000.

== History ==
Cornelius ("Bill") and Kathryn Tuomy were siblings from a family with deep roots in the Ann Arbor area. The pair were in the real estate business, and were responsible for the development of the Tuomy Hills area of Ann Arbor. In 1928, when Stadium Boulevard was first constructed, the Tuomys decided that the area where Stadium crossed Washtenaw needed a gas station. They hired Ann Arbor architects Lynn W. Fry and Paul Kasurin to design this service station, though other sources list the architect as Frank Carson (winner of the 1925 Prix de Rome). The Standard Oil Company leased the station, and exhibited a replica of it at the 1933 World's Fair in Chicago.

When Bill Tuomy died in 1966, Standard Oil bought the station, and ran it until 1988 when it was boarded up. In 1999, the station was refurbished for use as a University Bank ATM branch. In 2005, Bearclaw Coffee Co. moved into the station, and remains there as of 2026.

== Description ==
The Tuomy Hills Service Station is a single story commercial building, constructed in a style variously described as reflecting an Irish gatehouse or English gatekeeper's cottage. The walls consists of eight inches of brick faced with eight inches of stone. The station sits on a heavy concrete pad, and is roofed with slate. The structure has two porte-cochères, each supported with hand-hewn oak pillars.
