= Marshall Street Armory =

- Lansing Artillery Michigan National Guard Armory
- U.S. National Register of Historic Places
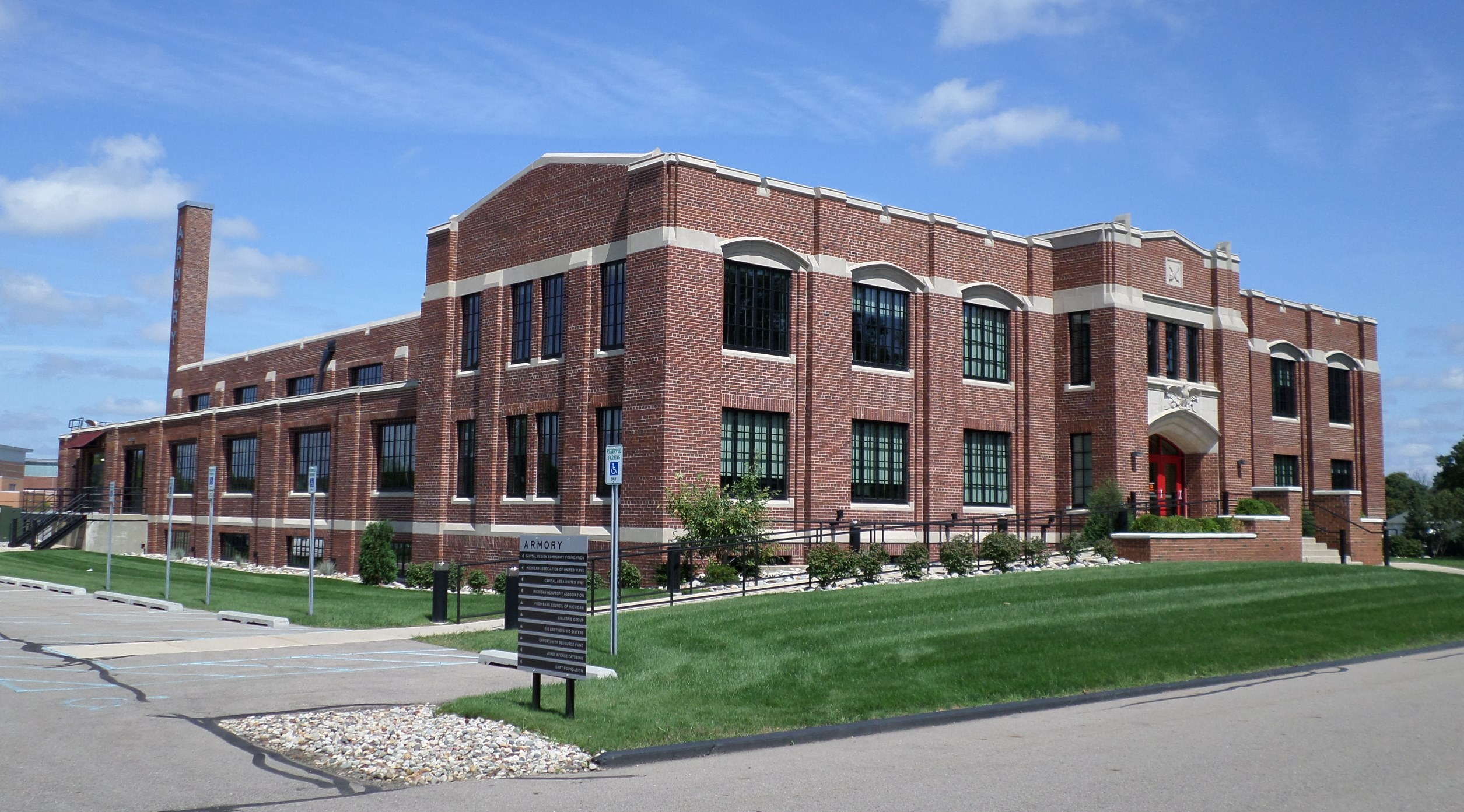
- Interactive map
- Location: 330 Marshall St, Lansing, Michigan
- Coordinates: 42°44′14″N 84°31′31″W
- Area: 4.5 acres (1.8 ha)
- Built: 1924
- Built by: Reniger Construction
- Architect: Lynn W. Fry
- Architectural style: Tudor Revival
- NRHP reference No.: 10001025
- Added to NRHP: December 13, 2010

The Marshall Street Armory (also known as the Lansing Artillery Michigan National Guard Armory) is a former armory for the Michigan National Guard. It was listed on the National Register of Historic Places in 2010.

== History ==
The first military unit in Lansing was founded in 1876, and in 1878 the group changed their name to the "Governor's Guards." A second unit, Battery A, First Field Artillery, was organized in 1905. Armories for these early units were likely rented structures. In 1920, the Michigan National Guard was reorganized, and the Lansing unit renamed the 119th Field Artillery, 32nd Division. A riding hall was constructed for the unit in 1922, and in 1923 the state legislature appropriated the money to construct an armory. This armory constructed in 1924 from a design by state architect Lynn W. Fry.

During the 1920s and 1930s, the armory was used for social events such as weddings, boxing matches and community gatherings. The building was renovated in 1941, and put to use during wartime. After the close of World War II, the building was again used for community events. In 2005, the Michigan National Guard was reorganized, and the Lansing unit moved to Charlotte, Michigan. The armory was sold to a private developer. It was renovated, and reopened in 2012 to house non-profit organizations.

== Description ==
The Marshall Street Armory is a rectangular two-story, red-brick, Tudor Revival structure with a raised basement and limestone trim. The front facade is symmetrical and seven bays wide, with a projecting entrance bay located in the center bay. The entrance is through a set of three doors with arched top transoms, located within a stone Tudor arch containing a carved stone eagle. Above are three single windows topped by a large stone band and stone trim along the top of the wall. On either side of the entrance bay are heavy brick piers. The three bays on each side are separated by brick piers, each bay has pairs of windows on each floor. The wide stone band continues through these bays, and contains blind arches above the windows. The entire wall is topped by a brick parapet wall.

The building is three bays deep, with similar treatments on the side bays. The rear of the building is seven bays long, and is divided into three sections. The center section is not quite two stories tall above the basement, while the side sections are a single story. One side has a lower ground level and an access into the lower level of the building.
