= Upper Peninsula State Fair =

- Status: active
- Genre: fairs
- Frequency: Annually, mid-August
- Location: Escanaba, Michigan
- Coordinates: 45°45′35″N 87°5′0″W
- Country: United States
- Years active: 98
- Inaugurated: September 17, 1928
- Website: www.upstatefair.net

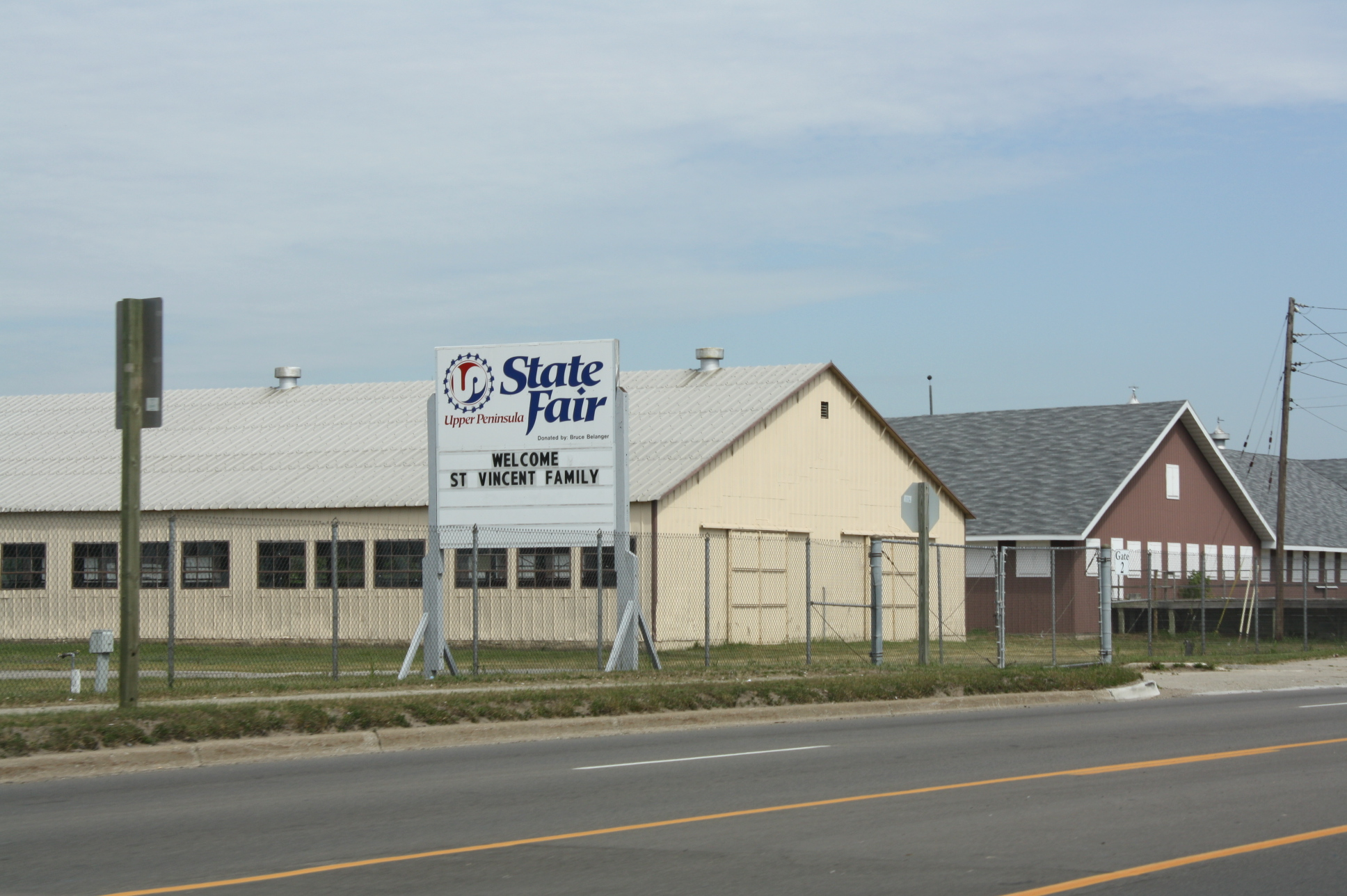
Buildings and sign

The Upper Peninsula State Fair (UP State Fair) is a fair held annually in the Upper Peninsula of the US state of Michigan. It is held in Escanaba in mid-August of each year. Prior to 2010, it was one of two official state fairs in Michigan.

In April 1927, Michigan Governor Fred W. Green signed Act 89, which stated that "an annual state fair at the City of Escanaba, which shall have for its main purpose the exploiting, and encouragement of improved methods in agriculture and industrial pursuits I hereby authorize." The opening day of the first Upper Peninsula State Fair was September 17, 1928. The original price for a ticket to the fair was 50 cents for adults, decreasing to 25 cents after 6pm. The present site encompasses 120 acres (49 ha) of land and 24 buildings. It also includes nearly 700 campsites.

In 2010, the state ceased funding for the fair and the downstate Michigan State Fair due to budget problems. Control of fair operations has been passed onto the Upper Peninsula State Fair Authority which includes representatives from each county in the UP and the Hannahville Indian Community. Despite the discontinuation of the downstate Michigan State Fair, which has failed to attract outside funding and struggled with sharply dropping attendance through the years, the UP State Fair will continue on into the foreseeable future.

The fair highlights the lumberjack history of the region through the Great Lakes Timber Show featuring logrolling, speedclimbing, sawing, and axe-throwing demonstrations.

The 2017 fair set a record of attendance of 87,750 according to the executive director of the Delta Chamber of Commerce, Vickie Micheau. The 2020 event was canceled because of crowd size restrictions due to the COVID-19 pandemic.

Besides 2020, World War II interrupted the fair between 1942 & 1945.
