= Detroit Department of Transportation =

Public transportation agency in Detroit, Michigan

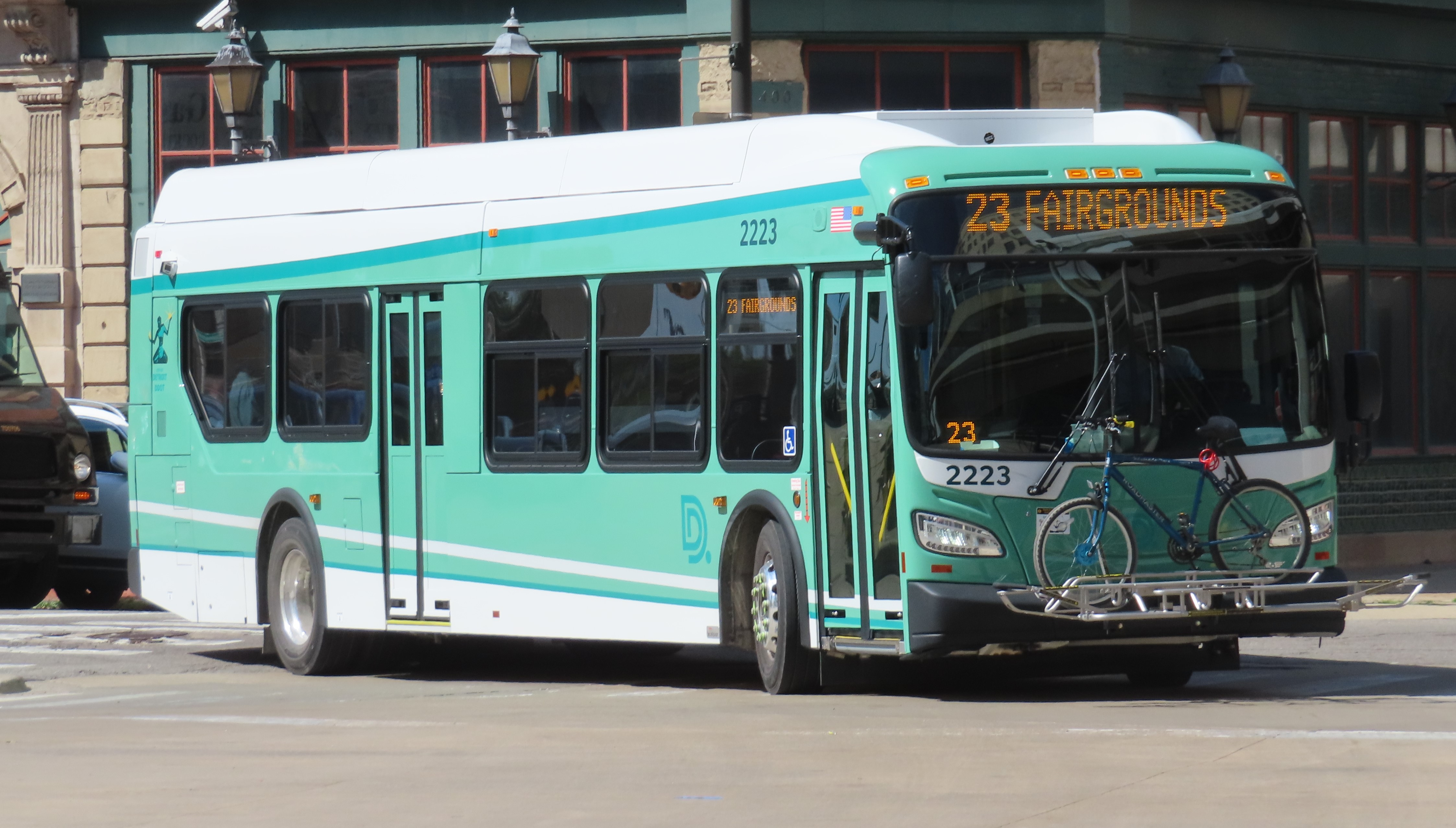
- DDOT bus in Downtown Detroit
- Formerly: Detroit Department of Street Railways (1922–1974)
- Parent: City of Detroit
- Founded: 1922
- Headquarters: 100 Mack Avenue
- Service area: Detroit and select surrounding cities
- Service type: Bus; Paratransit
- Routes: 37
- Hubs: Rosa Parks Transit Center; Jason Hargrove Transit Center
- Fleet: 296
- Daily ridership: 49,400 (weekdays, Q2 2026)
- Annual ridership: 14,737,000 (2025)
- Fuel type: Diesel; Electric
- Operator: City of Detroit
- Director: Robert Cramer
- Website: detroitmi.gov/ddot

The Detroit Department of Transportation (DDOT) (pronounced DEE-dot) is the primary public transportation operator serving the city of Detroit in the U.S. state of Michigan. Operating since 1922, DDOT is a division of the government of the city of Detroit, headed by a director appointed by the mayor. DDOT operates 37 bus routes, primarily serving Detroit and its enclaves, (Note: In addition to the city of Detroit and its enclaves, Hamtramck and Highland Park, some DDOT routes extend into the neighboring suburbs of Dearborn, Dearborn Heights, Livonia, Redford, River Rouge, and Southfield. Additionally, certain routes serve stops on Detroit's borders with the suburbs of Eastpointe, Ferndale, Harper Woods, Hazel Park, Grosse Pointe, Grosse Pointe Farms, Grosse Pointe Park, Melvindale, Oak Park, Royal Oak Township, and Warren.) and is accompanied by the Suburban Mobility Authority for Regional Transportation (SMART), which operates similar service in the suburbs. In 2025, the system had a ridership of 14,737,000, or about 49,400 per weekday as of the second quarter of 2026.

DDOT does not maintain roads; city roads are maintained by the Department of Public Works.

== History ==
=== Department of Street Railways ===
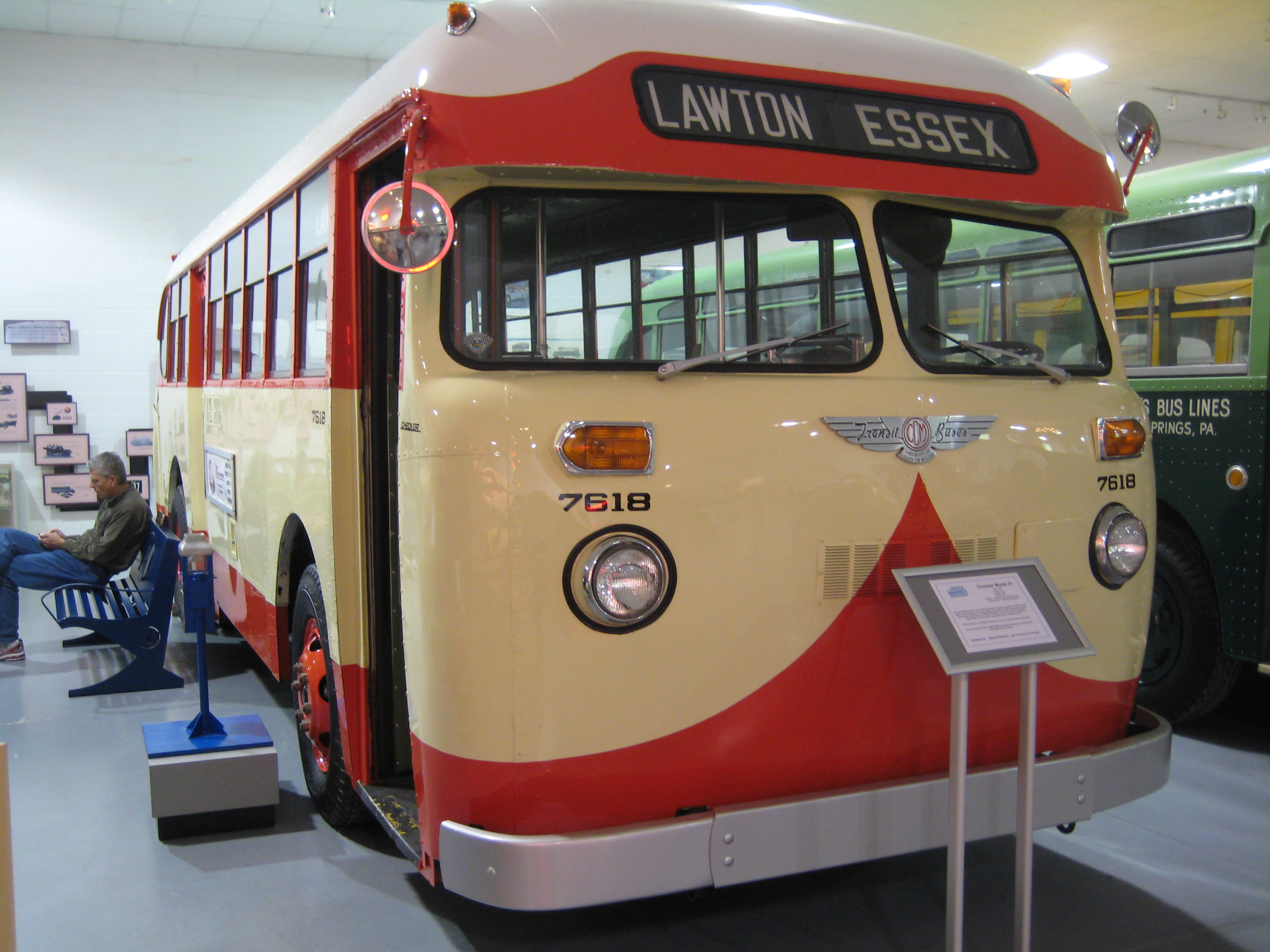
Restored ex-DSR bus 7618 built by Checker Cab at the AACA Museum in Hershey, Pennsylvania

DDOT began as the Department of Street Railways (DSR) in 1922 with the municipalization of the privately owned Detroit United Railway (DUR), which had controlled much of Detroit's mass transit operations since its incorporation in 1901. The DSR added bus service when it created the Motorbus Division in 1925. At the height of its operation in 1941, the DSR operated 20 streetcar lines with 910 streetcars. By 1952, only four streetcar lines remained: Woodward, Gratiot, Michigan and Jefferson. Streetcar services were discontinued in April 1956 with the decommissioning of the Woodward line. The DSR formally became DDOT in 1974.

DDOT logo used from 1974 to 2007. Used as an alternate logo until 2018.

=== 2000s-2020s ===
DDOT logo used from 2007 to 2018

Between 2009 and 2012, the system's seven remaining limited and express bus routes (70, 71, 72, 73, 74, 76, and 78) were discontinued.

Starting January 1, 2012, management of DDOT was contracted out to Parsons Brinckerhoff, an engineering and management firm. The firm subsequently subcontracted the management of the system to Envisurage, LLC a consultancy run by the former CEO of the Rochester-Genesee Regional Transportation Authority. On March 3, 2012, 24-hour service was discontinued, and other weekday and weekend routes and services were pared down, or eliminated entirely, in an attempt to produce savings for the department. In August 2013, management of DDOT was contracted out to MV Transportation under the direction of Paul Toliver until September 2014. Dan Dirks was appointed director of the department by mayor Mike Duggan on January 9, 2014, for the duration of MV Transportation's contract. MV Transportation's contract was extended for another two years on August 12, 2014.

On January 23, 2016, DDOT reintroduced 24-hour service on three principal routes along with other smaller service changes.

On September 1, 2018, the system's ten most popular routes were branded as "ConnectTen" and renumbered as routes 1-10, and received 24/7 service among other changes. The existing routes numbered 7, 9, and 10 were given higher route numbers to avoid conflict.

=== 2020s ===
In November 2021, the Detroit City Council approved plans to construct a new State Fair Transit Center, housed inside the disused Dairy Cattle Building, one of the last remaining structures from the State Fairgrounds. The Council rejected a prior plan, which called for the historic building's demolition. The original State Fair Transit Center, dating back to the streetcar era, closed permanently on November 6, 2022, and was promptly demolished; a temporary transit center was constructed in the former State Fair parking lot, 500 feet to the north, entering service the next day. Construction began on the new permanent transit center in May 2023.

The new State Fair Transit Center is dedicated to the memory of DDOT bus driver Jason Hargrove, who advocated for better protections for DDOT drivers during the early days of the COVID-19 pandemic. Hargrove died in April 2020 from COVID-19, and the transit center was dedicated in his memory in March 2024. The Jason Hargrove Transit Center opened on May 11, 2024.

==== "Reimagined" network overhaul ====
In the summer of 2022, DDOT announced DDOT Reimagined, a project to redesign the agency's route network and upgrade its infrastructure for better reliability, better coverage, more efficient travel, and reduced environmental impact. The plan's first phase, conducted that summer, consisted of public outreach to gather riders' input, through in-person and virtual meetings, workshops and pop-ups at popular bus stops.

In Spring 2023, DDOT launched the second phase of Reimagined, which included a draft of the planned redesign. The draft plan called for every route in the system to run at least every 30 minutes (where many currently run hourly), with more popular routes operating at 15-minute headways. Six routes – 3, 4, 6, 7, 9, & 10 – were slated for service every ten minutes (with route 4 running every 7½), and upgrades resembling bus rapid transit. These six, plus four other routes, would run 24/7 under this plan, with all other routes in the system running from 4 a.m. to 1 a.m., seven days a week.

To achieve this plan, three of the system's least-used routes – 12, 40, & 46 – were recommended for discontinuation, while four others – 23 & 39, 29 & 42 – would be combined into two resulting routes. Other routes would be rerouted, with some seeing extensions: of note was a proposed extension of route 17 into Livonia, a neighboring community which opts out of the suburban SMART system. A new route (70) was also proposed, planned to run near the Detroit Riverfront, connecting Belle Isle with the Gordie Howe International Bridge.

DDOT states that the planned redesign would mean 99% of regular riders would live within walking distance of a DDOT route, though the planned rerouting eliminates service on a number of streets. The agency conducted another series of outreach events to gauge riders' opinion, with a mobile exhibit, inside a converted bus, making a two-month tour of the system's major hubs.

In August 2023, DDOT's director, C. Mikel Oglesby, resigned. G. Michael Staley, then DDOT's paratransit manager, was appointed by Mayor Mike Duggan to replace Oglesby in an interim capacity. Staley previously served as a regional vice president at Veolia Transport, now known as Transdev.

DDOT published the final version of the Reimagined plan in February 2024. Most of the draft plan was kept, though public input influenced a couple of major changes: route 2 was added to the routes slated for service every 10 minutes, route 12 is no longer slated for discontinuation, and the extension of route 17 into Livonia was cancelled. Throughout the spring of 2024, DDOT will conduct further public outreach to gather feedback on the plan.

== Services ==
=== Fixed-route buses ===
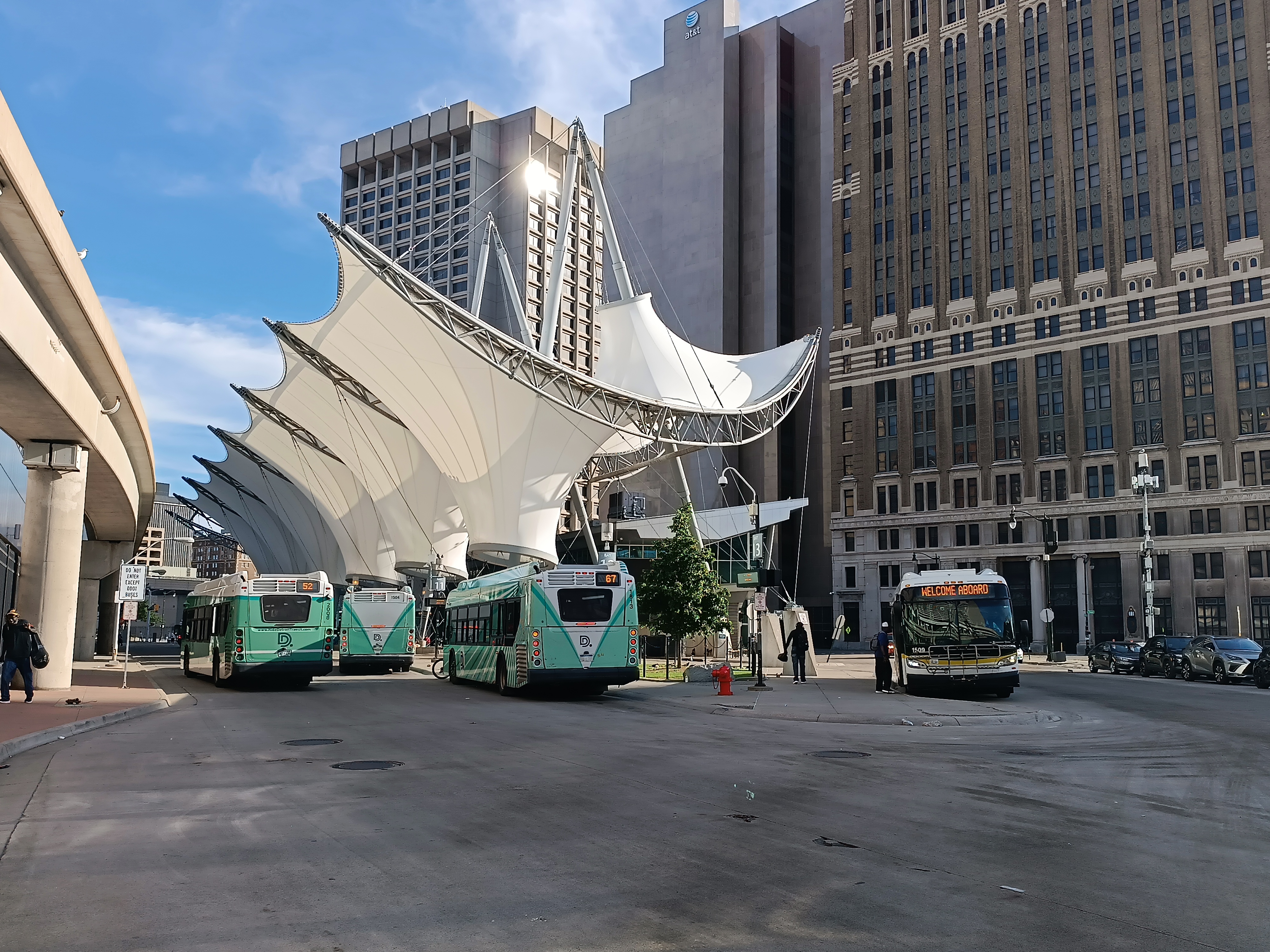
The Rosa Parks Transit Center in Downtown Detroit

DDOT primarily operates scheduled fixed-route bus services; the network's 37 routes mostly serve the city of Detroit and its enclaves of Hamtramck and Highland Park, though select routes also service neighboring suburbs. Many routes originate from DDOT's two primary transit centers, the Rosa Parks Transit Center in Downtown Detroit, and the Jason Hargrove Transit Center on Detroit's northern border. Bus service generally operates between 5 a.m. and 12:30 a.m. Monday through Saturday, while Sunday service starts approximately 7 a.m. and ends between 8 and 9 p.m. Routes 3-8, 10, 16 and 17 operate at all times.

DDOT's bus services are operated with a fleet of 296 transit buses, consisting of the following:

- New Flyer XD40
- New Flyer XD60
- New Flyer XDE40
- New Flyer XE40
- New Flyer XE60
- Proterra ZX5 40’

==== List of current routes ====
All termini listed are in the city of Detroit unless otherwise noted.

= ConnectTen
= 30-minute rush hour frequency
= 60-minute rush hour frequency

#	Name	Termini		Length	Frequency (min)			Notes
#	Name	Termini		Length	Mon-Fri	Sat	Sun	Notes
1	Vernor	Rosa Parks Transit Center	Michigan Avenue & Schaefer Road (Dearborn)	9.2 mi (14.8 km)	25-30	30	45	
2	Michigan	Rosa Parks Transit Center	Fairlane Town Center (Dearborn)	10.5 mi (16.9 km)	20-30	30	60	
3	Grand River	E Jefferson Avenue & Beaubien Boulevard	Grand River Avenue & 7 Mile Road	15 mi (24 km)	10-12	15	15	
4	Woodward	Rosa Parks Transit Center	Jason Hargrove Transit Center	10 mi (16 km)	12	20	20	
5	Van Dyke/Lafayette	Rosa Parks Transit Center	Bel Air Center	15 mi (24 km)	20-30	30	45	
6	Gratiot	3rd Avenue & Michigan Avenue	Gratiot Avenue & 8 Mile Road	11.9 mi (19.2 km)	15	20	30	
7	Seven Mile	Moross Road & Mack Avenue	Old Redford Meijer	19.8 mi (31.9 km)	15-20	20	30	
8	Warren	Moross Road & Mack Avenue	Warren Road & Telegraph Road	20.1 mi (32.3 km)	20–30	30	45	
9	Jefferson	Rosa Parks Transit Center	Mack Avenue & Alter Road	8.8 mi (14.2 km)	10-12	15	15	
10	Greenfield	Fairlane Town Center (Dearborn)	Henry Ford Providence Hospital (Southfield)	13.9 mi (22.4 km)	15-20	20	20	Overnight service ends at Michigan/Greenfield
11	Clairmount	Warren Avenue & Conner Avenue	Fort Street & Clark Street	14.8 mi (23.8 km)	60	-	-	
12	Conant	Belle Isle	Jason Hargrove Transit Center	11.8 mi (19.0 km)	45-60	60	60	
13	Conner	Jefferson Avenue & St. Jean Street	Bel Air Center	8.2 mi (13.2 km)	60	60	60	
15	Chicago/Davison	McNichols Road & Joseph Campau Avenue	Plymouth Road & Burt Road	12.7 mi (20.4 km)	60	60	60	Truncated to Woodward/Manchester on weekends
16	Dexter	W Jefferson Avenue & Shelby Street	Old Redford Meijer	17.1 mi (27.5 km)	15-20	20	20	Truncated to Rosa Parks Transit Center on weekends
17	Eight Mile	Moross Road & Mack Avenue	Grand River Avenue & 7 Mile Road	22.6 mi (36.4 km)	20-25	30	30	
18	Fenkell	Rosa Parks Transit Center	Fenkell Avenue & Telegraph Road	17.5 mi (28.2 km) (detour)	40	45	60	
19	Fort	Rosa Parks Transit Center	Fort Street & W Outer Drive	8.3 mi (13.4 km)	35-40	60	60	
23	Hamilton-John R	Rosa Parks Transit Center	8 Mile Road & Woodward Avenue	11.6 mi (18.7 km)	45-60	60	60	
27	Joy	Rosa Parks Transit Center	Telegraph Road & W Chicago (Redford)	15.7 mi (25.3 km)	50	50	50	
29	Linwood	Rosa Parks Transit Center	University of Detroit Mercy	9.6 mi (15.4 km)	50	50	50	
30	Livernois	W Jefferson Avenue & Brennan Street	Jason Hargrove Transit Center	14.8 mi (23.8 km)	40–60	60	60	
31	Mack	Rosa Parks Transit Center	Moross Road & Mack Avenue	10.7 mi (17.2 km)	20-30	30	60	
32	McNichols	Moross Road & Mack Avenue	McNichols Road & Telegraph Road	24 mi (39 km)	30-50	60	60	Truncated to Old Redford Meijer on weekends
38	Plymouth	Gratiot + French	I-96 & Middlebelt Road (Livonia)	20.9 mi (33.6 km)	60	60	60	
39	Puritan	Woodward Avenue & Manchester Parkway (Highland Park)	M-39 & Fenkell Avenue	6.9 mi (11.1 km)	60	60	60	
40	Russell	Rosa Parks Transit Center	East Outer Drive & Van Dyke Avenue	14.9 mi (24.0 km)	50-70	70	70	
41	Schaefer	W Jefferson Avenue & Brennan Street	8 Mile Road & Schaefer Highway	13.8 mi (22.2 km)	60	60	60	
42	Mid-City Loop	Clockwise loop through Woodward & Mack, Woodward & Manchester		12 mi (19 km)	60	60	60	
43	Schoolcraft	Woodward Avenue & Manchester Parkway (Highland Park)	Telegraph Road & W Chicago (Redford)	11.5 mi (18.5 km)	60	60	60	
46	Southfield	Fairlane Town Center (Dearborn)	9 Mile Road & Rutland Drive (Southfield)	12.4 miles (20.0 km)	60	-	-	Weekday peak only
47	Tireman	Mack Avenue & John R Street	River Rouge Park	12 miles (19 km)	50	-	-	
52	Chene	Rosa Parks Transit Center	Nevada Avenue & Van Dyke Avenue	12.8 miles (20.6 km)	60	60	60	
54	Wyoming	W Jefferson Avenue & West End Street	Jason Hargrove Transit Center	15.4 miles (24.8 km)	60	60	60	
60	Evergreen	Fairlane Town Center (Dearborn)	Evergreen Road & 10 Mile Road (Southfield)	11.6 miles (18.7 km)	30	30	60	
67	Cadillac-Harper	Rosa Parks Transit Center	Moross Road & Mack Avenue	13.2 miles (21.2 km)	60	60	60	
68	Chalmers	Jefferson Avenue & St. Jean Street	8 Mile Road & Schoenherr Road	9.2 miles (14.8 km)	60	60	60	

==== Fares ====
Standard fixed-route bus fares as of April 2026:

- Regular: $2
- Reduced (for seniors, Medicare cardholders, disabled riders, and local K-12 students): 50¢
- Children under 44" tall and Wayne State University students: free

Fares can be paid onboard with cash; the standard fare includes a transfer ticket upon request, valid for unlimited additional rides on DDOT and SMART buses for four hours.

Unlimited-ride "Dart" passes are available, allowing unlimited rides for one, seven, or 31 days. Some passes are accepted only on DDOT, while "regional" Dart passes are also valid on SMART. All Dart passes can be purchased from DDOT's ticket offices at the Rosa Parks and Jason Hargrove Transit Centers, and regional Dart passes are also sold at SMART's ticket offices in downtown Detroit and Royal Oak, at select local retailers, and online on SMART's website.

All DDOT fares and passes are available digitally through the Transit and Token Transit mobile apps.

=== Paratransit ===
Along with fixed-route bus service, DDOT also offers MetroLift, an on-demand paratransit service. MetroLift service is operated by four private contractors: Moe Transportation, Big Star Transit, Checker Cab Company, and Delray United Action Council.

=== Detroit Downtown Trolley ===
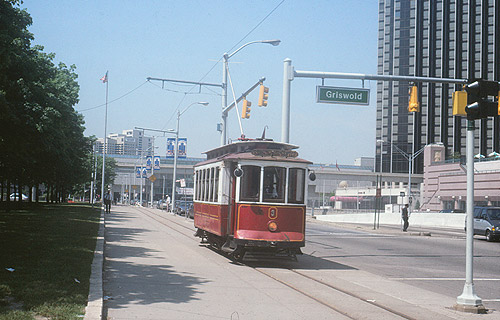
An ex-Lisbon streetcar on Jefferson Avenue in 1991

DDOT owned and operated the Detroit Downtown Trolley (originally the Detroit Citizens' Railway), a heritage trolley built in 1976 as a U.S. Bicentennial project. The trolley operated on a 1-mile L-shaped route from Grand Circus Park to near the Renaissance Center, via Washington Boulevard and Jefferson Avenue, using narrow-gauge trams acquired from municipal rail services outside the U.S. The service was discontinued in June 2003.

== Governance ==
DDOT is an executive department of the government of the city of Detroit, led by a director hired by the mayor.

=== Collective bargaining ===
DDOT's bus operators are represented by Amalgamated Transit Union Local 26, and mechanics are represented by AFSCME Local 312.

== See also ==
- Detroit People Mover
- Suburban Mobility Authority for Regional Transportation
- QLine
