= Michigan State Fairgrounds Coliseum =

Arena in Detroit, Michigan

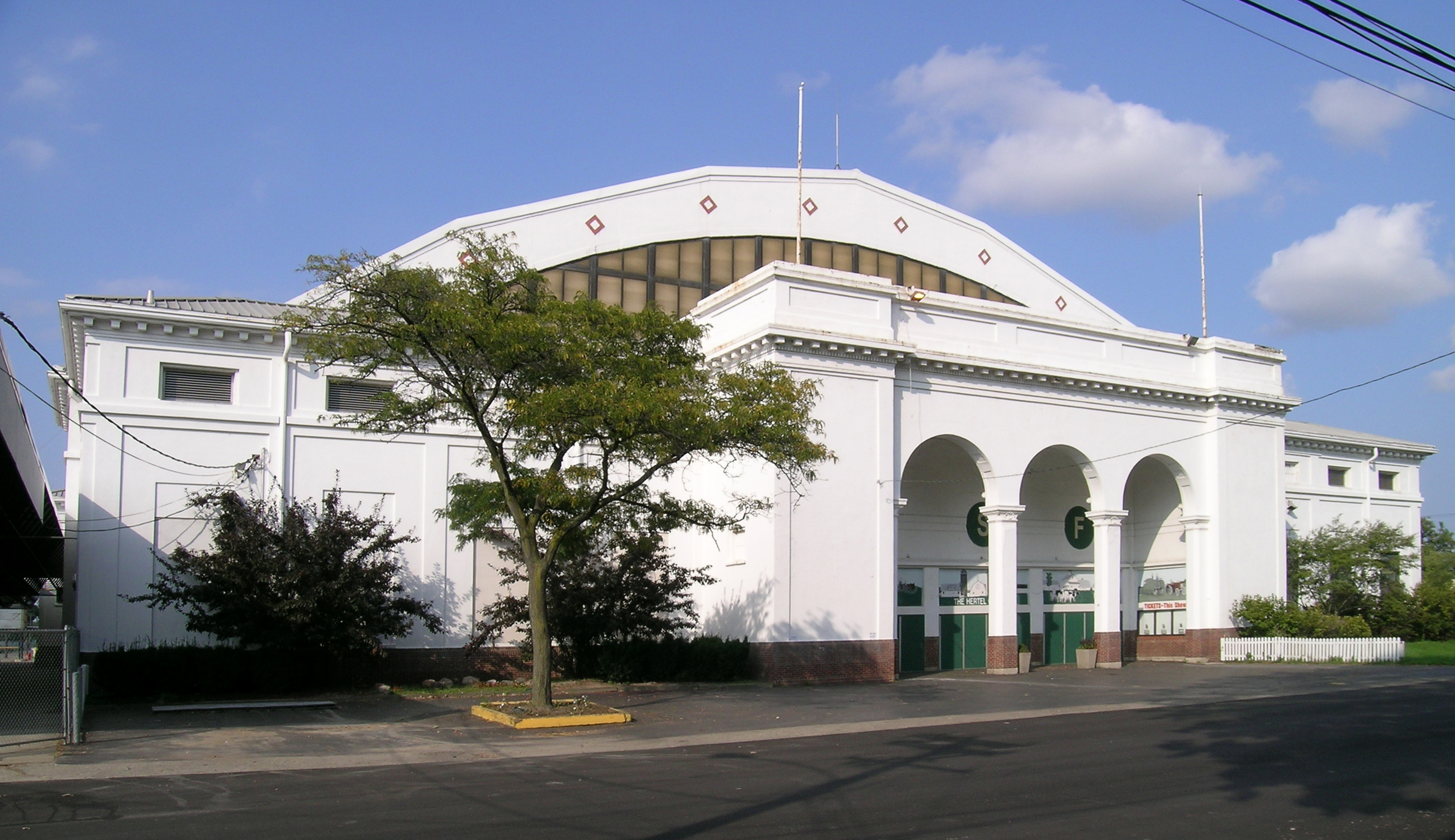
- Coliseum at the Michigan State Fair
- Interactive map of Michigan State Fairgrounds Coliseum
- Former names: Hockeytown State Fair Coliseum
- Location: 1120 W. State Fair Ave., Detroit, Michigan
- Coordinates: 42°26′36″N 83°7′3″W
- Capacity: 5,600
- Surface: 200 by 85 feet (61 m × 26 m) (hockey)

Construction
- Opened: 1922
- Demolished: 2022
- Architect: Lynn W. Fry

Tenants
- Wayne State Warriors (NCAA) (1999–2000, 2005–2008); Royal Oak-Shrine Catholic Knights (CHSL) (2006–2007, 2008–2009)
- Michigan State Fair Riding Coliseum, Dairy Cattle Building, and Agricultural Building
- U.S. National Register of Historic Places
- U.S. Historic district – Contributing property
- NRHP reference No.: 80001925
- Added to NRHP: June 6, 1980

Michigan State Fairgrounds Coliseum (also Hockeytown State Fair Coliseum) was a 5,600-seat multi-purpose arena in Detroit, Michigan. The coliseum, built in 1922, was part of the former Michigan State Fairgrounds until its demolition in early 2022. The Michigan State Fair, the oldest state fair in the United States, was held here until 2009. The coliseum has also been the long-time venue of Detroit performances by the Shrine Circus.

Between 1999 and 2008, the Coliseum was home to the Wayne State University Warriors ice hockey team. Wayne State played its first collegiate hockey season in 1999 at the arena following the coliseum's renovation. Wayne State played its next three seasons at the Great Lakes Sports City Superior Arena in Fraser and then two seasons at the Compuware Sports Arena in Plymouth before returning to the Coliseum in 2005. The arena was also host to the 2006 men's and women's College Hockey America conference tournament.

Between early 1999 and mid-2000, the Michigan State Fairgrounds Coliseum was the site of three Extreme Championship Wrestling house shows.

In 2006 the Royal Oak-Shrine Catholic High School Knights ice hockey team began playing at the State Fairgrounds Coliseum. The team left in 2007; they returned in the 2008–2009 season for their first varsity season.

The Motor City Mechanics of the United Hockey League, which had suspended operations in 2006, planned to resume in 2008 and play at the Coliseum. But this never took place, and the UHL (rebranded as the International Hockey League) closed in 2010.

The exterior of the coliseum was used as the Flint Fairgrounds Coliseum in the 2008 movie Semi-Pro.

In 2020, the state fairgrounds were sold to Amazon; the company plans to convert the site into a $400 million distribution center. As of this date, it is planned that the buildings on the site, including the Coliseum, will be demolished. Demolition began on the building in January 2022, and was completed by the next May. The facade of the building, however, will remain preserved.
