= Michigan State Fair =

Annual event

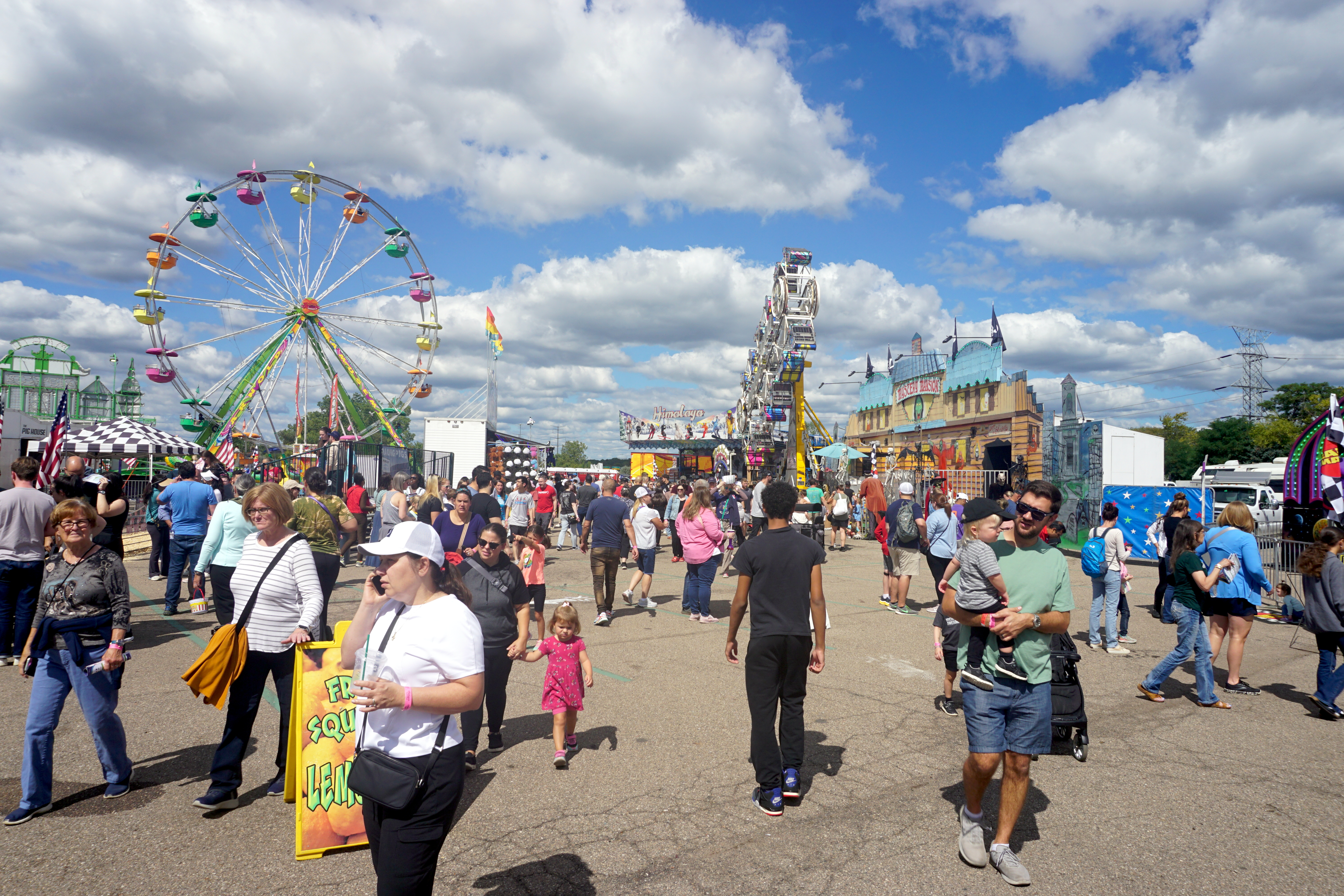
2025 Michigan State Fair

The Michigan State Fair is an annual event originally held from 1849 to 2009 in Detroit, the state's largest city. In 2009 the governor declined to fund it because of other priorities.

Because agriculture still has a major place in the Michigan economy, in 2011 supporters organized the Great Lakes Agricultural Fair, a 501 C (3) organization, in order to continue the event. Since 2013 it has been organized by the private Michigan State Fair LLC and held in the Suburban Collection Showplace as of January 1st 2026 Vibe Credit Union Showplace in the Metro Detroit suburb of Novi.

== History ==
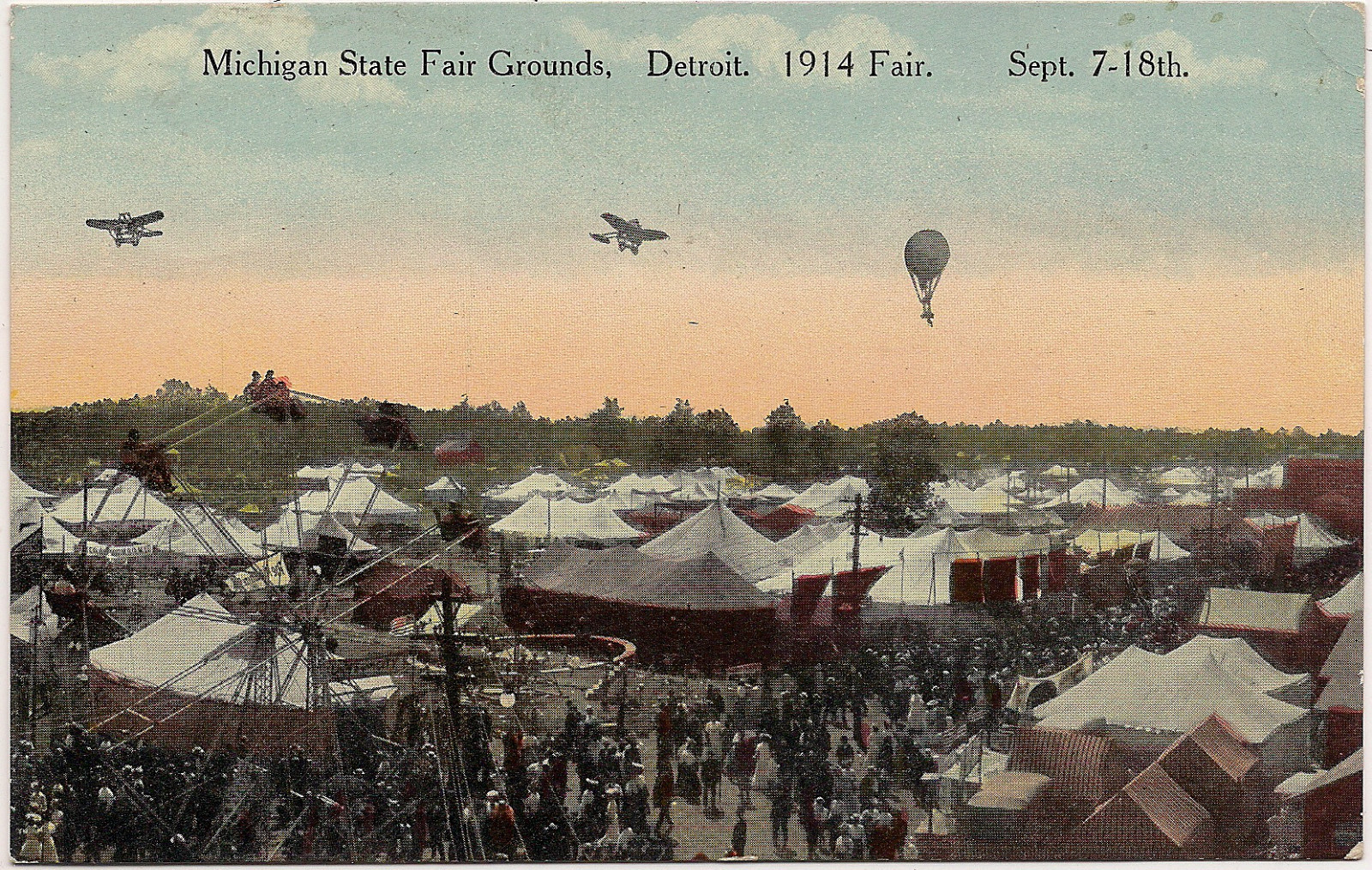
Card promoting the 1914 Michigan State Fair

The first official Michigan State Fair was held in 1849 in Detroit, Michigan. The first state fair had been held on October 1, 1839 in Ann Arbor, Michigan. It was moved to Detroit in 1849. Subsequent Michigan state fairs were held in other cities until 1905, when it received what was its permanent home for decades at the Michigan State Fairgrounds in Detroit.

In 1904, Joseph L. Hudson, together with three of his associates, organized to acquire a site for the fair. They formed the State Fair Land Company, which acquired 135 acres (0.55 km^{2}) between 7½ and 8 Mile roads, east of Woodward Avenue. Having no interest in running the fair, Hudson sold the land to the Michigan State Agricultural Society for one dollar on April 18, 1905. The Agricultural Society accepted the land and purchased an additional 32 acres (130,000 m^{2}), extending the fairgrounds to 167 acres (0.68 km^{2}). Throughout the following years, additional land was purchased and sold. The present size of the fairgrounds in Detroit is 164 acres (0.66 km^{2}).

Michigan State Fairgrounds Coliseum, also known as the Hockeytown State Fair Coliseum, was a 5,600-seat multi-purpose arena located on the fairgrounds. In 1899 a one-mile track was constructed at the fairgrounds and originally used for Thoroughbred flat racing and Standardbred harness racing. In the mid-20th century, two NASCAR races were held on this track. Tommy Thompson won the 1951 event and Tim Flock won in 1952.

On October 30, 2009, Governor Jennifer Granholm vetoed legislation to provide funding to the Michigan State Fair.

Attendance had peaked at 1.2 million in 1966. In 2009 fair attendance had declined to 217,000 visitors. The state fair was not held in the following two years.

On April 9, 2012, Governor Rick Snyder signed Senate Bill 515 and House Bill 4803, which would authorize the transfer of the fairgrounds land to the Land Bank Fast Track Authority, which would oversee the land for future development, including plans for a station for the proposed commuter rail service.

As the agricultural industry is Michigan's second leading economic industry, many people were disturbed by the failure of the state to support a state fair. They organized Great Lakes Agricultural Fair, a 501(c)(3) organization, in 2011 to ensure such events continued.

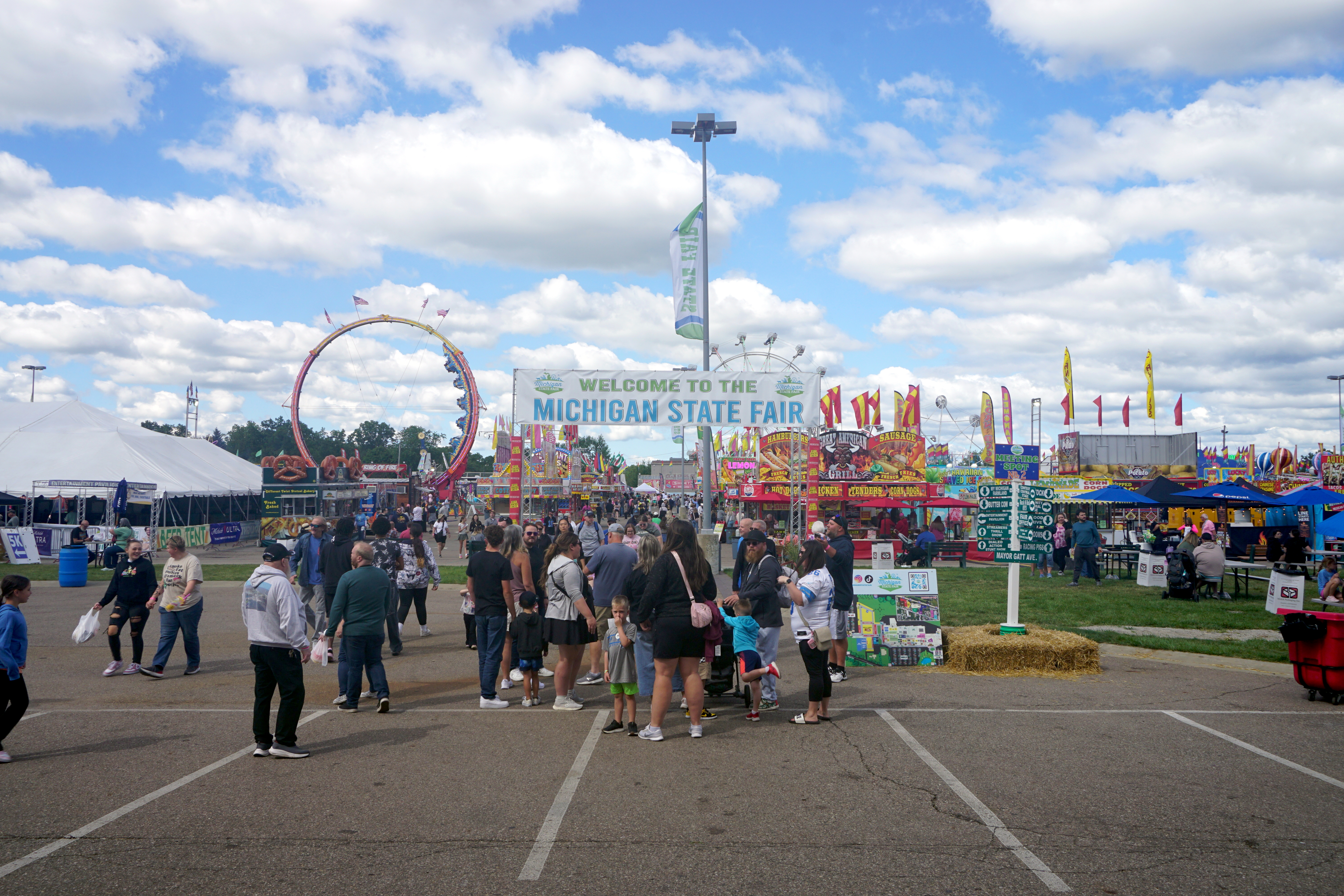
Midway at the 2025 Michigan State Fair

The Great Lakes State Fair took place August 31 through September 3, 2012, at the Suburban Collection Showplace in the Detroit suburb of Novi.

In 2013, Fifth Third Bank became the name sponsor, so the event was called the Fifth Third Bank Michigan State Fair, again held in Novi at the Suburban Collection Showplace. Organizing the fair was taken over by Michigan State Fair LLC.

Seven years later, a virtual fair was held for the Livestock & Agricultural Exhibitors to showcase, as the overall event was canceled due to the COVID-19 pandemic.

Today, the Michigan State Fair continues to be held annually in Novi at the Vibe Credit Union Showplace as a privately operated event with no taxpayer funding. The Fair is made possible through admissions, partnerships, and the generous support of corporate and local sponsors. Over the years, major partners have included Fifth Third Bank, Ram Trucks, Henry Ford Health, and HAP, among others. Their support has helped the Michigan State Fair continue its longstanding traditions while growing and evolving for future generations.

== Incidents ==
On August 31, 2024, a teenager was killed, and a second was injured, when shot in a parking lot outside the fair. Police say the attack is related to an argument that had been occurring during the week.

== See also ==
- Upper Peninsula State Fair
- Michigan State Fairgrounds Coliseum
- Michigan State Fairgrounds Speedway
- Michigan State Fair Riding Coliseum, Dairy Cattle Building, and Agricultural Building
