= Tahoe station =

Bus rapid transit station in Mississauga, Ontario, Canada

Tahoe
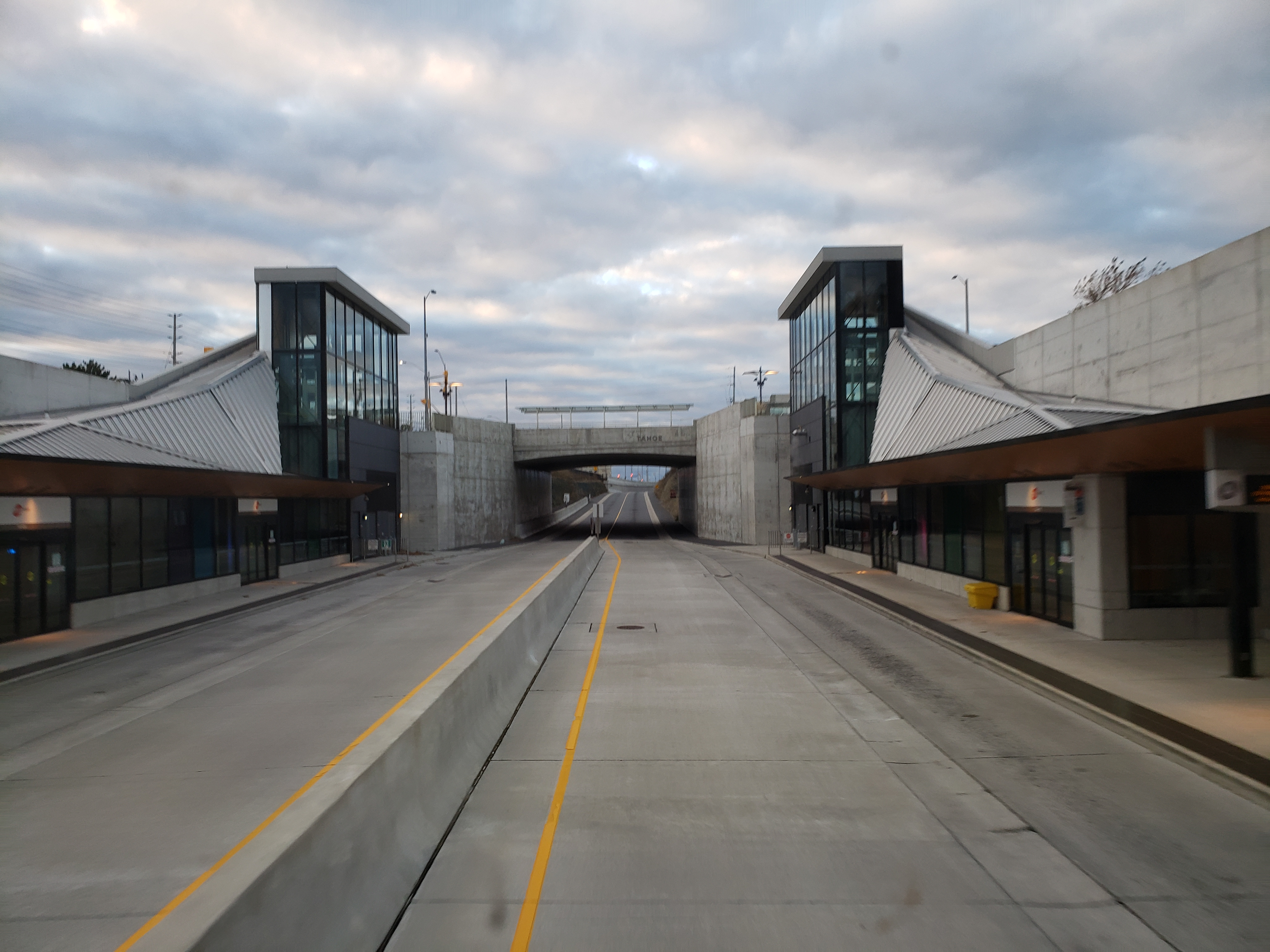

General information
- Location: 4650 Tahoe Boulevard; Mississauga, Ontario; Canada
- Coordinates: 43°38′19″N 79°36′36″W
- Owner: City of Mississauga
- Operator: MiWay
- Line: Mississauga Transitway
- Platforms: 2
- Connections: MiWay buses: 107 Malton Express; 109 Meadowvale Express; 135 Eglinton Express

Construction
- Accessible: Yes

History
- Opened: February 16, 2016

Services
Preceding station	Metrolinx	Following station
Dixie toward Winston Churchill	Mississauga Transitway	Etobicoke Creek toward Renforth
Location

Tahoe is a bus rapid transit station on the Mississauga Transitway in Mississauga, Ontario, Canada. It is located along the east side of Eastgate Parkway on the south side of Tahoe Boulevard.

Tahoe and Etobicoke Creek opened on 16 February 2016.
