= Spectrum station =

Bus rapid transit station in Mississauga, Ontario, Canada

Spectrum
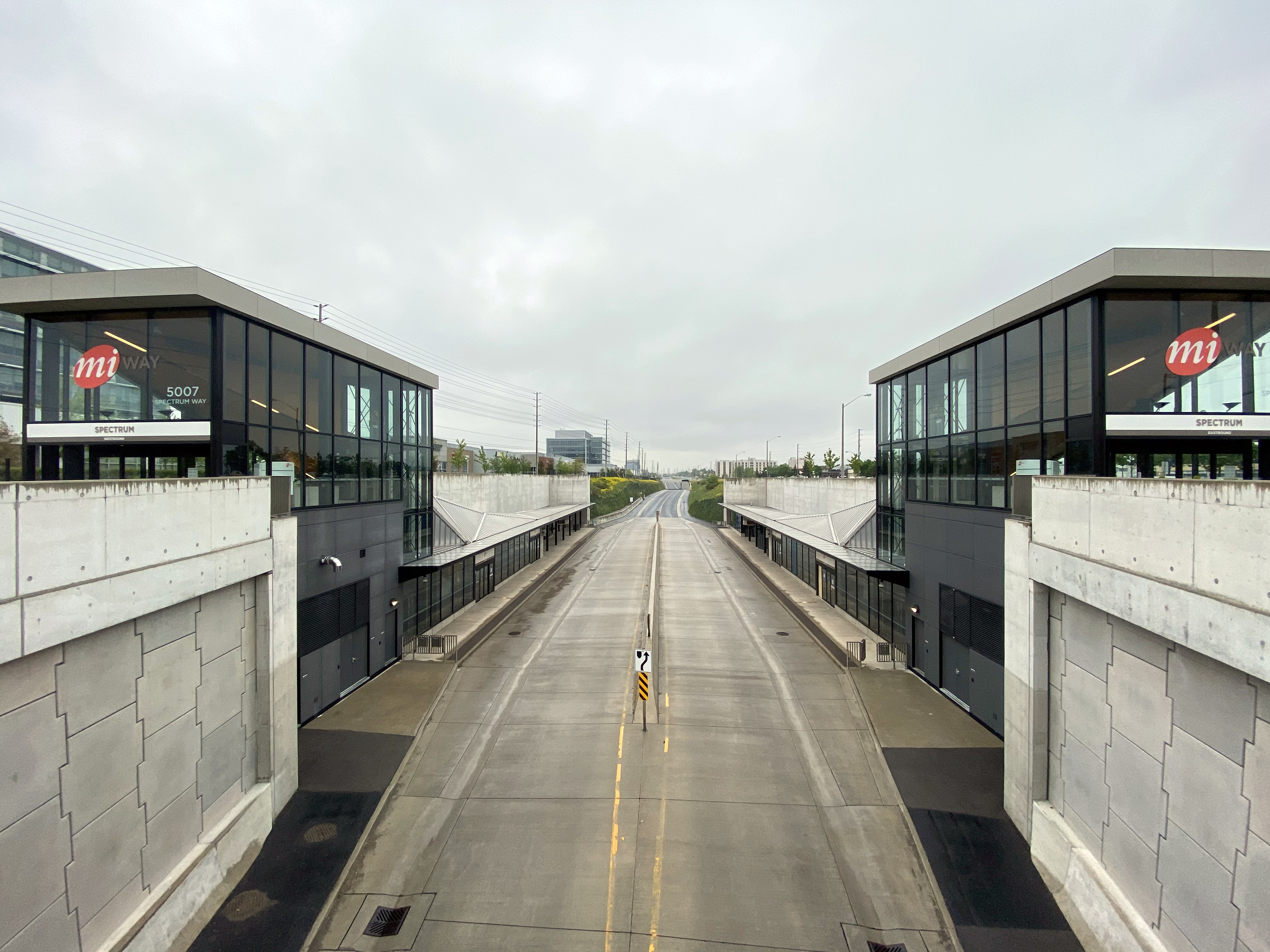

General information
- Location: 5005 Spectrum Way; Mississauga, Ontario; Canada
- Coordinates: 43°38′57″N 79°36′23″W
- Owner: City of Mississauga
- Operator: MiWay
- Platforms: 2
- Connections: MiWay buses: 35 Eglinton; 107 Malton Express; 109 Meadowvale Express; 135 Eglinton Express

Construction
- Accessible: yes

History
- Opened: 1 May 2017

Services
Preceding station	Metrolinx	Following station
Etobicoke Creek toward Winston Churchill	Mississauga Transitway	Orbitor toward Renforth
Location

Spectrum is a bus rapid transit station on the Mississauga Transitway in Mississauga, Ontario, Canada. It is located along the north side of Eglinton Avenue at Spectrum Way.

Spectrum and Orbitor opened on 1 May 2017.
