= Central Parkway station =

Bus rapid transit station in Mississauga, Ontario, Canada

Central Parkway
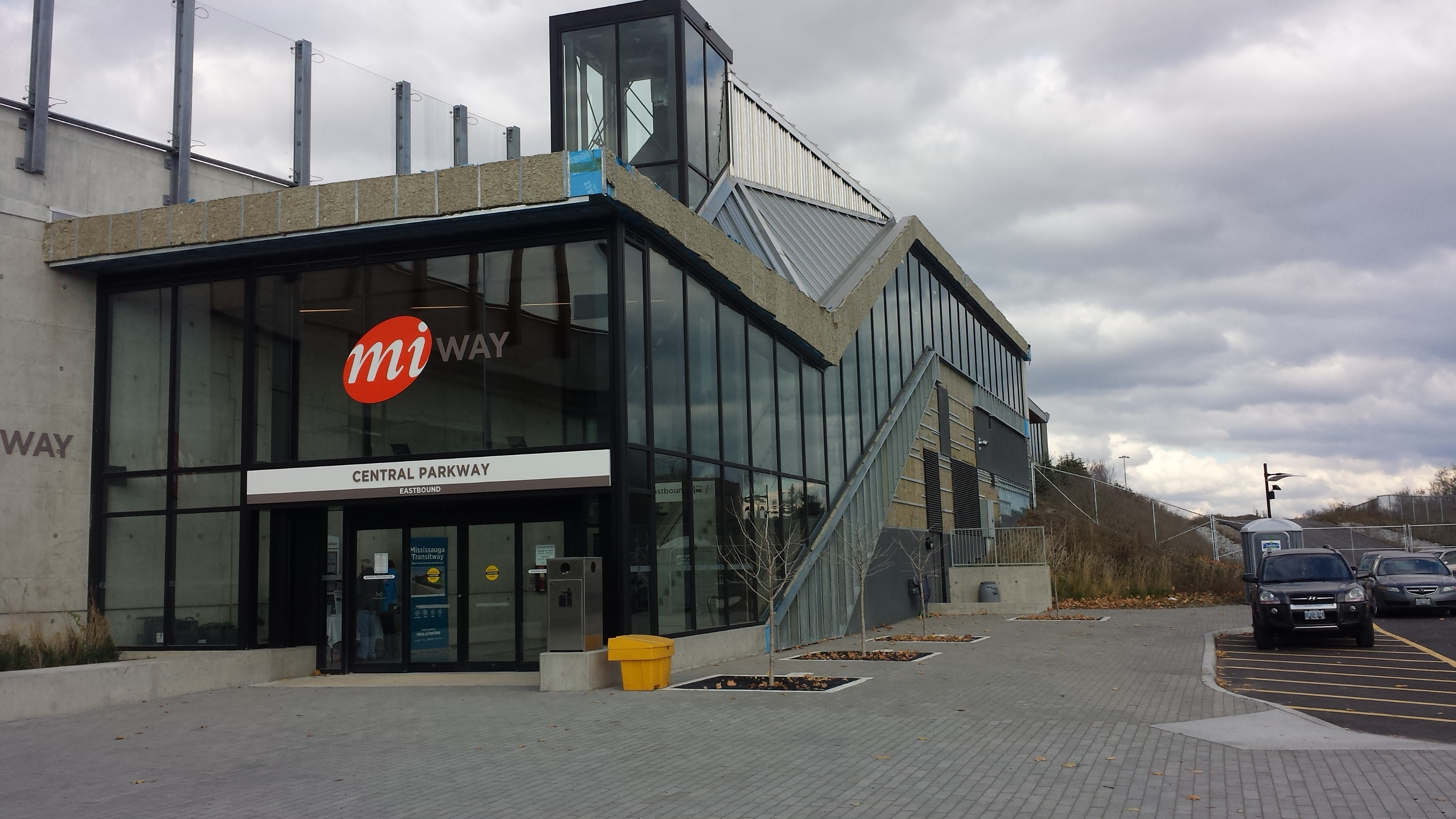

General information
- Location: 4325 Central Parkway East; Mississauga, Ontario; Canada
- Coordinates: 43°36′28″N 79°38′10″W
- Owner: City of Mississauga
- Operator: MiWay
- Line: Mississauga Transitway
- Platforms: 2
- Bus routes: MiWay buses: 10 Bristol; 53 Kennedy; 107 Malton Express; 109 Meadowvale Express

Construction
- Cycle facilities: Lock up area with racks
- Accessible: yes

History
- Opened: November 17, 2014

Services
Preceding station	Metrolinx	Following station
City Centre toward Winston Churchill	Mississauga Transitway	Cawthra toward Renforth
Location

Central Parkway is a bus rapid transit station on the Mississauga Transitway in central Mississauga, Ontario, Canada. It is located on the east side of Central Parkway East along the south side of Highway 403. The street suffix "Parkway" was added to the station name so commuters didn't assume it was the central station in the system, which is located one stop west at the City Centre.

The first four stations on the Transitway at Central Parkway, Cawthra, Tomken and Dixie, opened on November 17, 2014.
