= Cawthra station =

Bus rapid transit station in Ontario, Canada

Cawthra
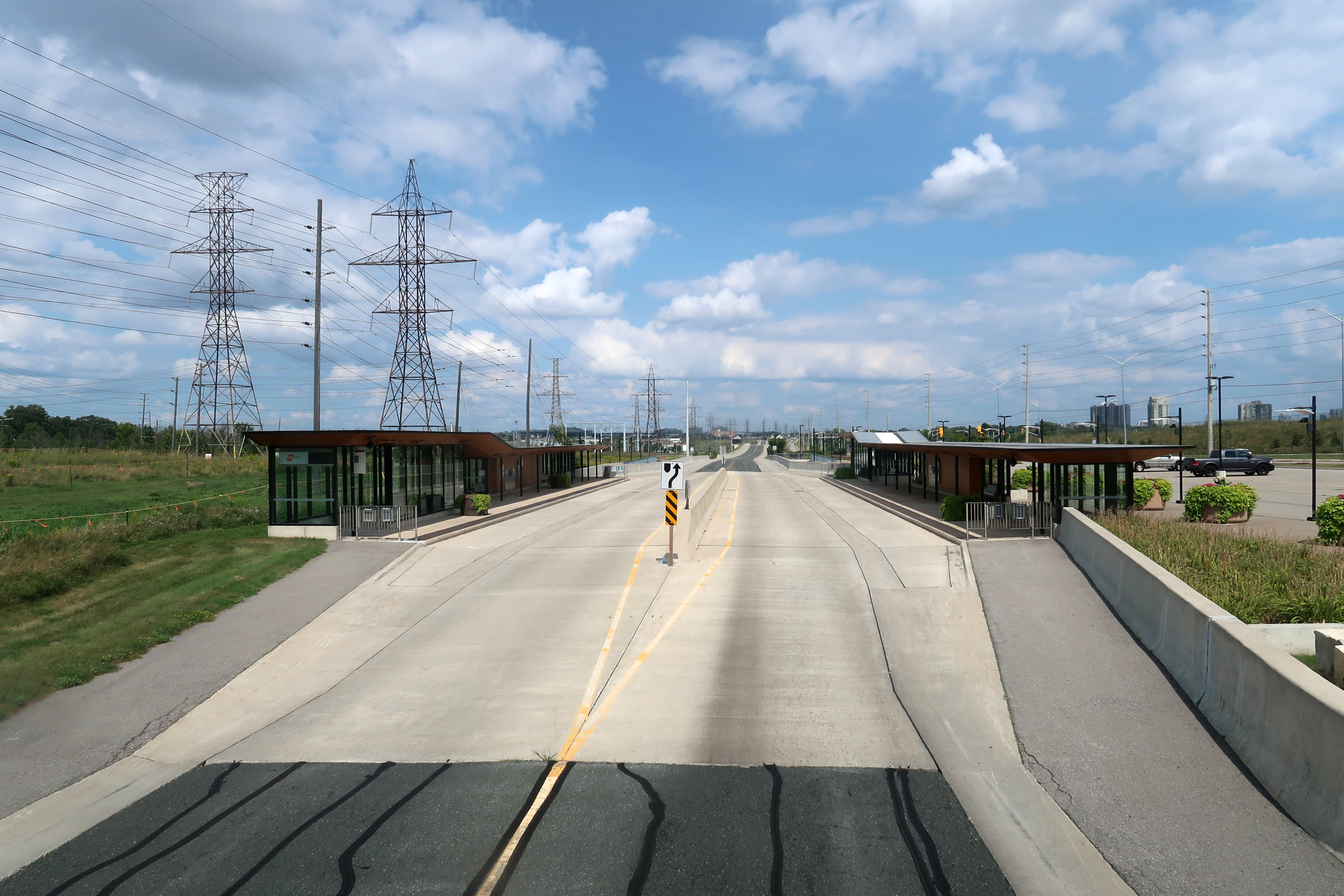

General information
- Location: 775 Eastgate Parkway; Mississauga, Ontario; Canada
- Coordinates: 43°37′03″N 79°37′40″W
- Owner: City of Mississauga
- Operator: MiWay
- Line: Mississauga Transitway
- Platforms: 2
- Bus routes: 107 Malton Express; 109 Meadowvale Express

Construction
- Parking: 60 spaces
- Cycle facilities: lock up area with racks
- Accessible: yes

History
- Opened: November 17, 2014

Services
Preceding station	Metrolinx	Following station
Central Parkway toward Winston Churchill	Mississauga Transitway	Tomken toward Renforth
Location

Cawthra is a bus rapid transit station on the Mississauga Transitway in central Mississauga, Ontario, Canada. It is located along the north side of Eastgate Parkway on the east side of Cawthra Road.

The first four stations on the Transitway at Central Parkway, Cawthra, Tomken and Dixie, opened on 17 November 2014.
