= Tomken station =

Bus rapid transit station in Mississauga, Ontario, Canada

Tomken
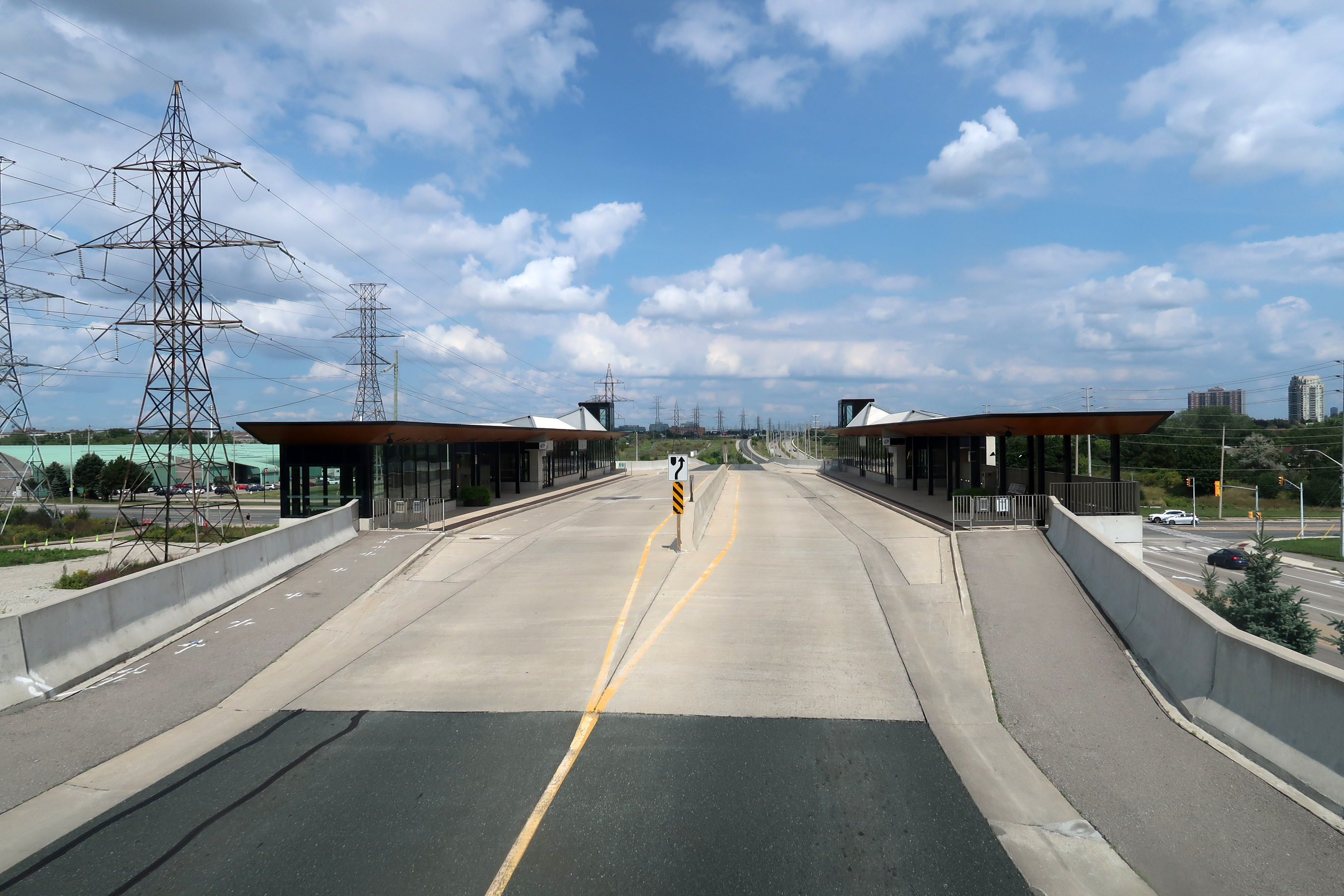

General information
- Location: 4450 Tomken Road; Mississauga, Ontario; Canada
- Coordinates: 43°37′18″N 79°37′25″W
- Owner: City of Mississauga
- Operator: MiWay
- Line: Mississauga Transitway
- Platforms: 2
- Connections: MiWay buses: 51 Tomken; 107 Malton Express; 109 Meadowvale Express

Construction
- Cycle facilities: Lock up area with racks
- Accessible: Yes

History
- Opened: November 17, 2014

Services
Preceding station	Metrolinx	Following station
Cawthra toward Winston Churchill	Mississauga Transitway	Dixie toward Renforth
Location

Tomken is a bus rapid transit station on the Mississauga Transitway in central Mississauga, Ontario, Canada. It is located on the west side of Tomken Road along the north side of Eastgate Parkway.

The first four stations on the Transitway at Central Parkway, Cawthra, Tomken and Dixie, opened on 17 November 2014.
