= Etobicoke Creek station =

Bus rapid transit station in Mississauga, Ontario, Canada

Etobicoke Creek
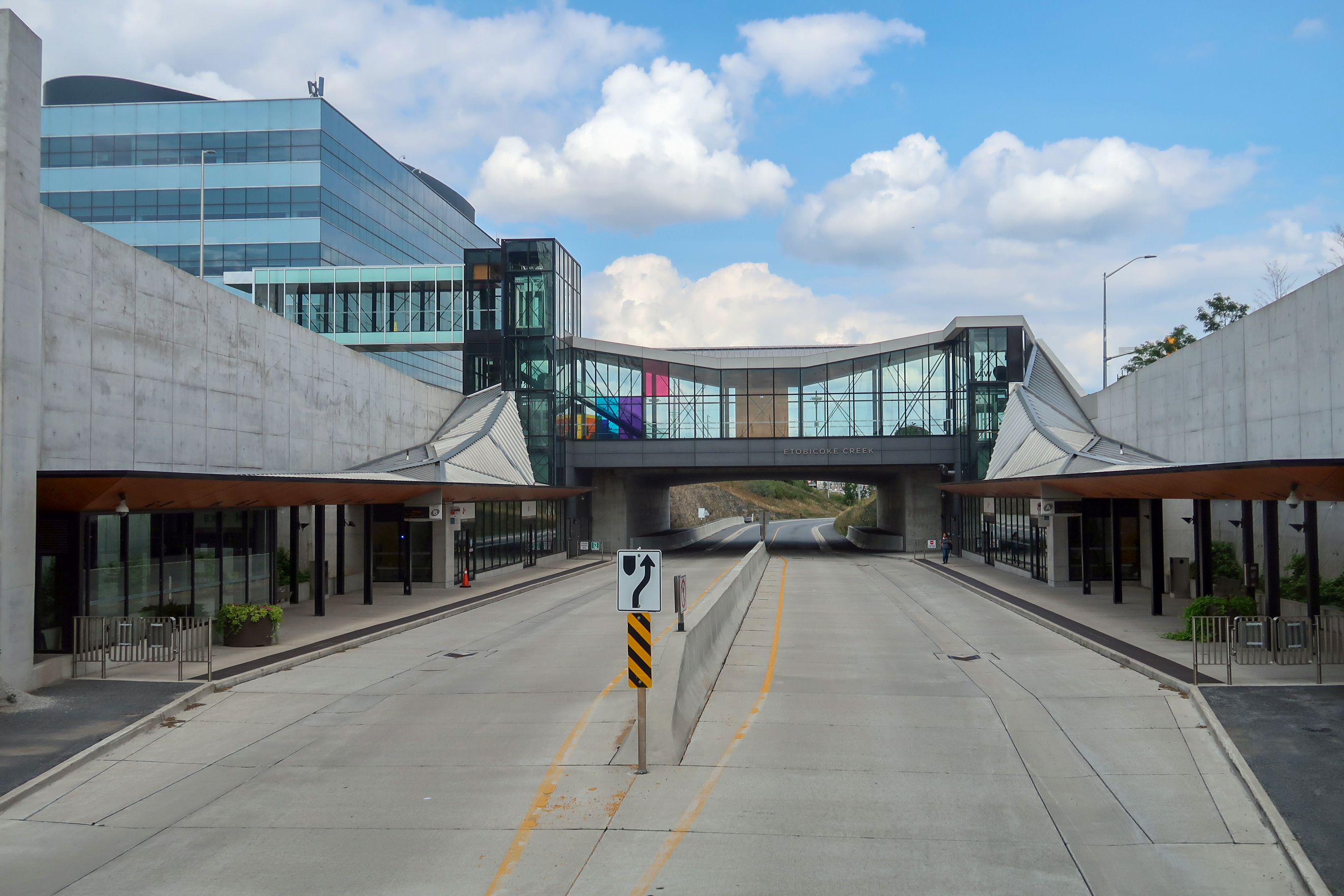

General information
- Location: 1915 Eglinton Avenue East; Mississauga, Ontario; Canada
- Coordinates: 43°38′41″N 79°36′40″W
- Owner: City of Mississauga
- Operator: MiWay
- Platforms: 2
- Connections: MiWay buses: 35 Eglinton; 107 Malton Express; 109 Meadowvale Express; 135 Eglinton Express

Construction
- Accessible: yes

History
- Opened: February 16, 2016

Services
Preceding station	Metrolinx	Following station
Tahoe toward Winston Churchill	Mississauga Transitway	Spectrum toward Renforth
Location

Etobicoke Creek is a bus rapid transit station on the Mississauga Transitway in Mississauga, Ontario, Canada. It is located along the north side of Eglinton Avenue at Tahoe Boulevard.

Tahoe and Etobicoke Creek stations opened on February 16, 2016.
