= Dixie Station (disambiguation) =

Dixie Station was a geographical location in the South China Sea during the Vietnam War.

Dixie Station may also refer to:

- Dixie GO Station, a commuter railway station in Mississauga, Ontario, Canada
- Dixie station (MiWay), a bus rapid transit station in Mississauga, Ontario, Canada
