= Erin Mills station =

Bus station in Mississauga, Ontario

Erin Mills
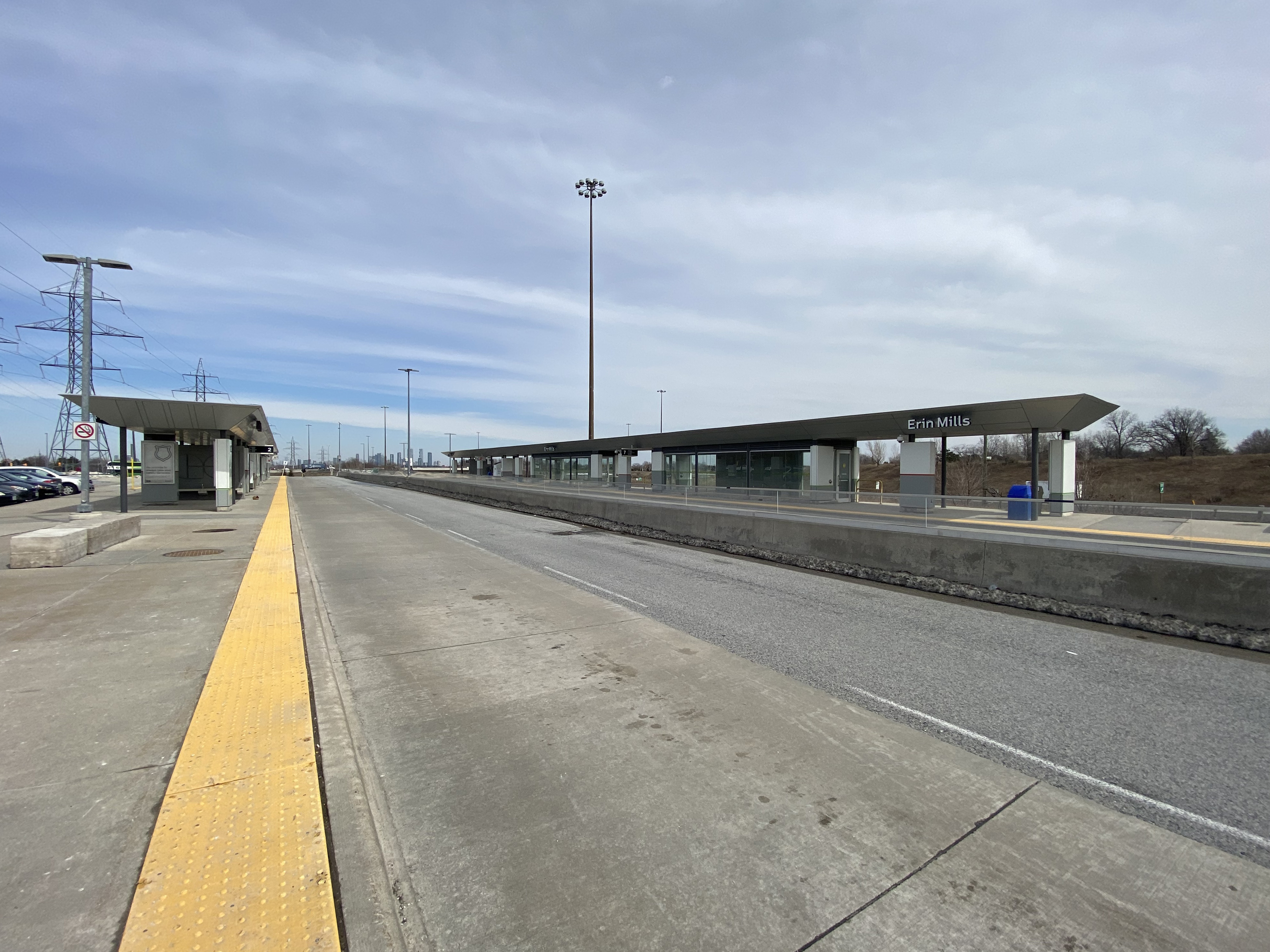
- Erin Mills station in 2023

General information
- Location: 4430 Erin Mills Parkway; Mississauga, Ontario; Canada
- Coordinates: 43°33′13″N 79°41′57″W
- Owner: Metrolinx
- Platforms: Side platform
- Bus routes: GO Transit buses: 25 Waterloo/Mississauga; 25L Waterloo/Mississauga; 29 Guelph/Mississauga; 41 Hwy 407 West; 47G Hwy 407 West; 47W Hwy 407 West; 56 Hwy 407 East; MiWay buses: 46 Tenth Line; 48 Erin Mills; 109 Meadowvale Express; 110 University Express
- Bus operators: GO Transit; MiWay

Construction
- Parking: 300 park and ride spaces
- Cycle facilities: Shelters
- Accessible: Yes

Other information
- Station code: GO Transit: EMTW
- Fare zone: 21

History
- Opened: September 7, 2015

Services
Preceding station	Metrolinx	Following station
Winston Churchill Terminus	Mississauga Transitway	City Centre toward Renforth
Location

Erin Mills is a bus station in the community of Erin Mills in western Mississauga, Ontario, Canada. It is located northwest of the Erin Mills Parkway/Highway 403 interchange and is a stop on the Mississauga Transitway.

Metrolinx began construction of the Mississauga Transitway West between Winston Churchill Boulevard and Erin Mills Parkway in October 2013 and the entire project was expected to be complete in 2016. The station opened earlier than expected in September 2015 for GO Transit buses but MiWay did not begin serving the station until September 2016.

== Bus service ==
=== GO Transit ===
- 25, 25L Waterloo/Mississauga
- 29 Guelph/Mississauga
- 41, 47G, 47W Hwy 407 West Corridor
- 56 Highway 407 East Corridor

=== MiWay ===
- 46 Tenth Line
- 48 Erin Mills
- 109 Meadowvale Express
- 110 University Express
