= Dixie station (MiWay) =

Bus rapid transit station in Mississauga, Ontario, Canada

Dixie
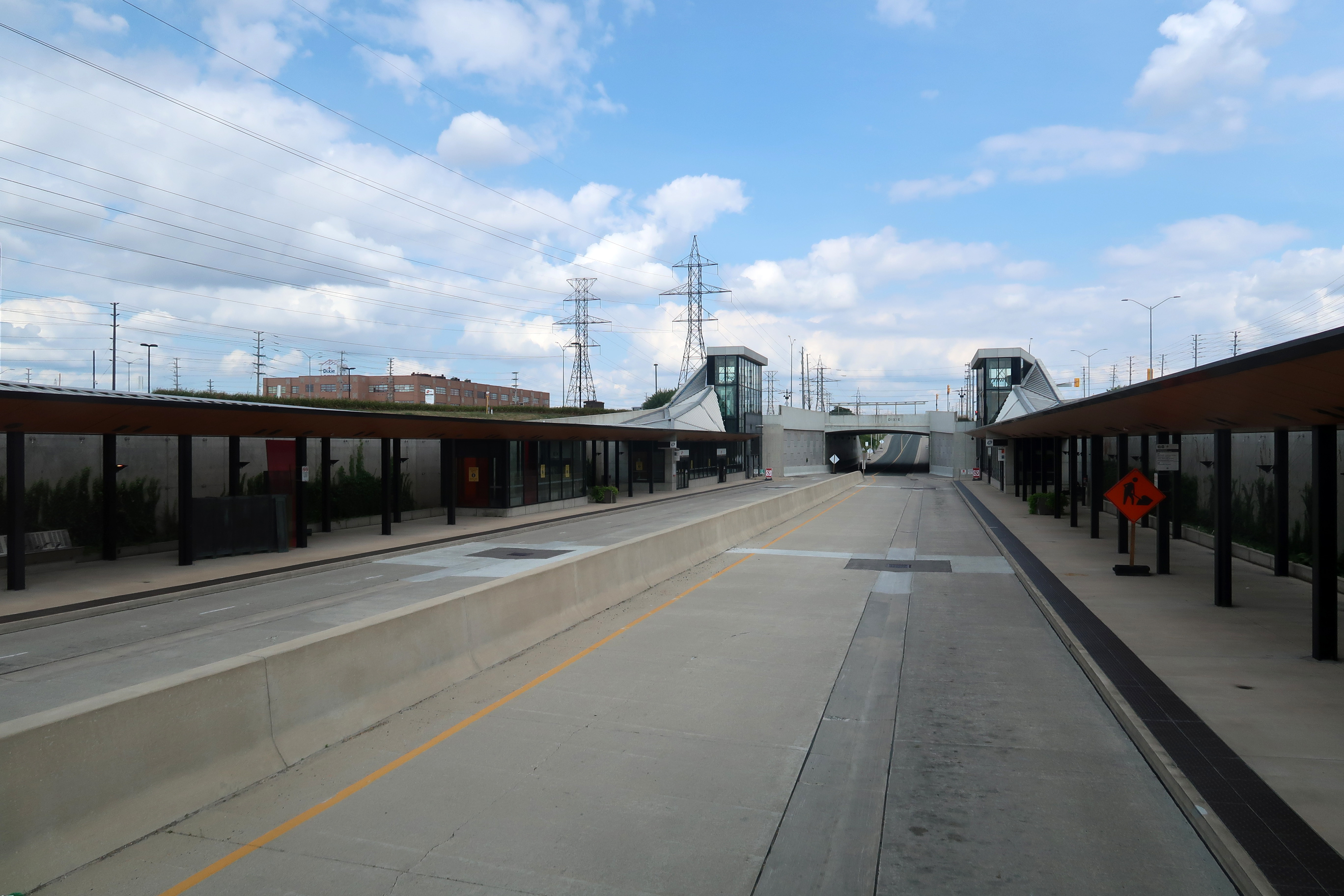
- Dixie station platform

General information
- Location: 4440 Dixie Road; Mississauga, Ontario; Canada
- Coordinates: 43°37′49″N 79°36′52″W
- Owner: City of Mississauga
- Line: Mississauga Transitway
- Platforms: 4
- Bus routes: MiWay buses: 5 Dixie; 73 Kamato; 74 Explorer; 107 Malton Express; 109 Meadowvale Express; 135 Eglinton Express; GO Transit buses: 19 Mississauga / North York; 25K Waterloo / Mississauga; 29 Guelph/Mississauga; 40 Hamilton / Richmond Hill; 94 Pickering / Square One
- Bus operators: MiWay; GO Transit

Construction
- Parking: 170 spaces
- Cycle facilities: Lock up area with racks
- Accessible: Yes

Other information
- Station code: GO Transit: DIXI
- Fare zone: 25

History
- Opened: November 17, 2014

Services
Preceding station	Metrolinx	Following station
Tomken toward Winston Churchill	Mississauga Transitway	Tahoe toward Renforth
Location

Dixie is a bus rapid transit station on the Mississauga Transitway in central Mississauga, Ontario, Canada. It is located on the west side of Dixie Road along the north side of Eastgate Parkway.

The first four stations on the Transitway at Central Parkway, Cawthra, Tomken, and Dixie, opened on 17 November 2014.

== Bus routes ==
=== MiWay ===
==== Transitway-running routes ====
- 107 Malton Express
- 109 Meadowvale Express
- 135 Eglinton Express

==== Connecting routes ====
- 5 Dixie
- 73 Kamato
- 74 Explorer

=== GO Transit ===
- 19 Mississauga/North York
- 25K Waterloo/Mississauga
- 29 Guelph/Mississauga
- 40 Hamilton/Richmond Hill Pearson Express
- 94 Pickering/Square One
