= Mississauga Transitway =

Bus rapid transit system in Mississauga, Ontario

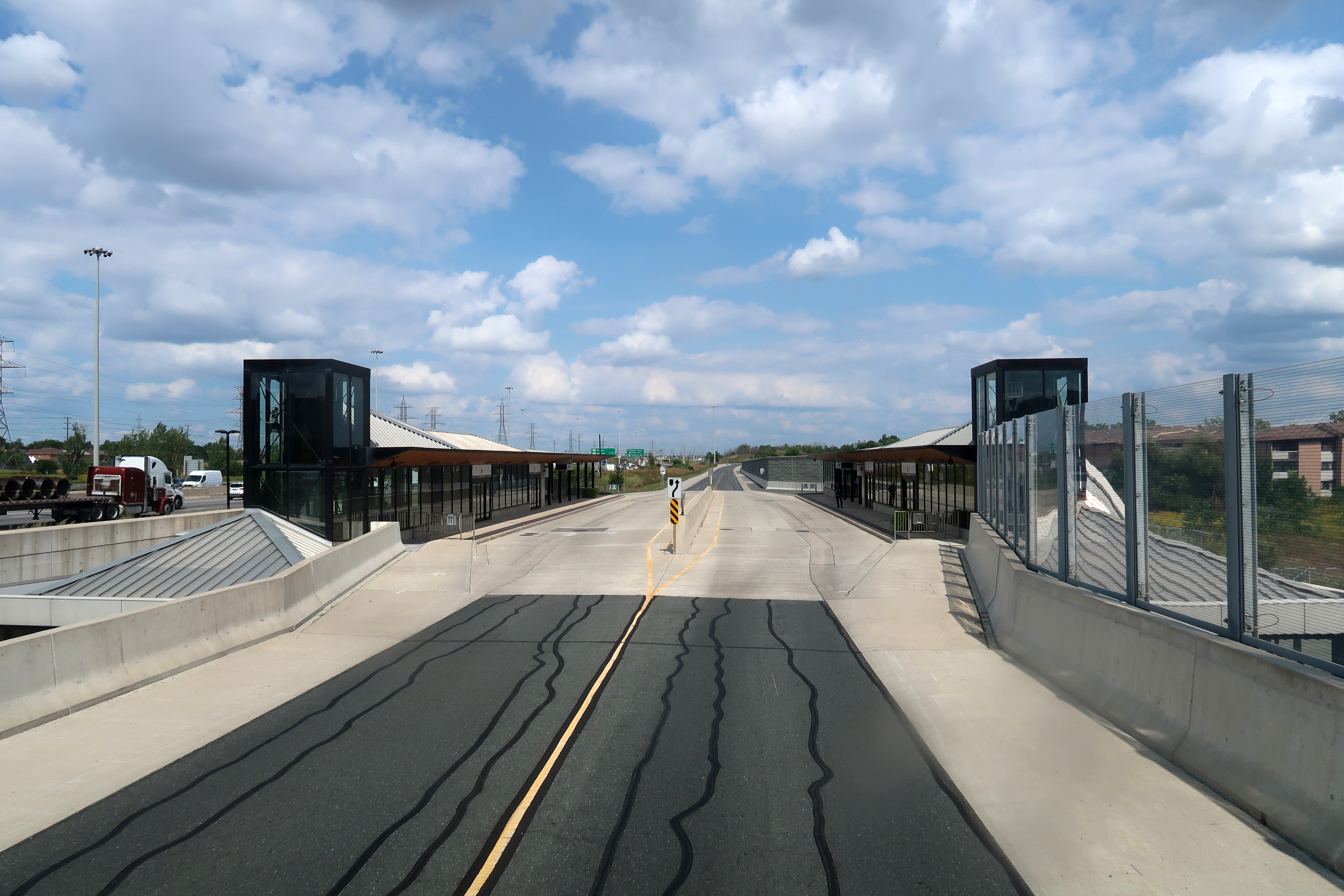
- Central Parkway station, 2021

Overview
- Locale: Mississauga, Ontario, Canada
- Transit type: Bus rapid transit
- Number of stations: 12

Operation
- Began operation: November 17, 2014 – November 22, 2017; 8 years ago
- Operators: MiWay; GO Transit

Technical
- System length: 18 km (11 mi)
System map

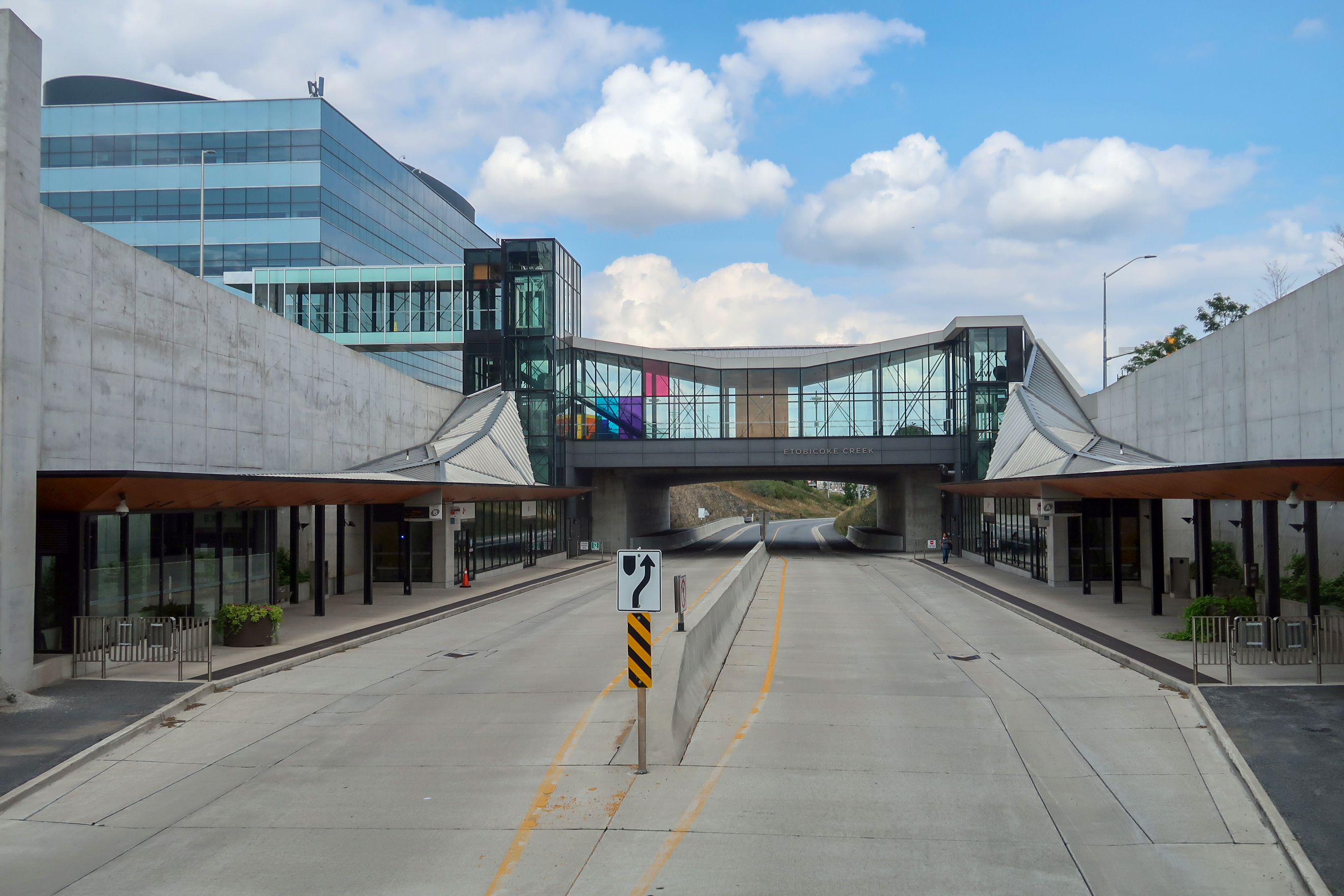
Etobicoke Creek Station bus driveway

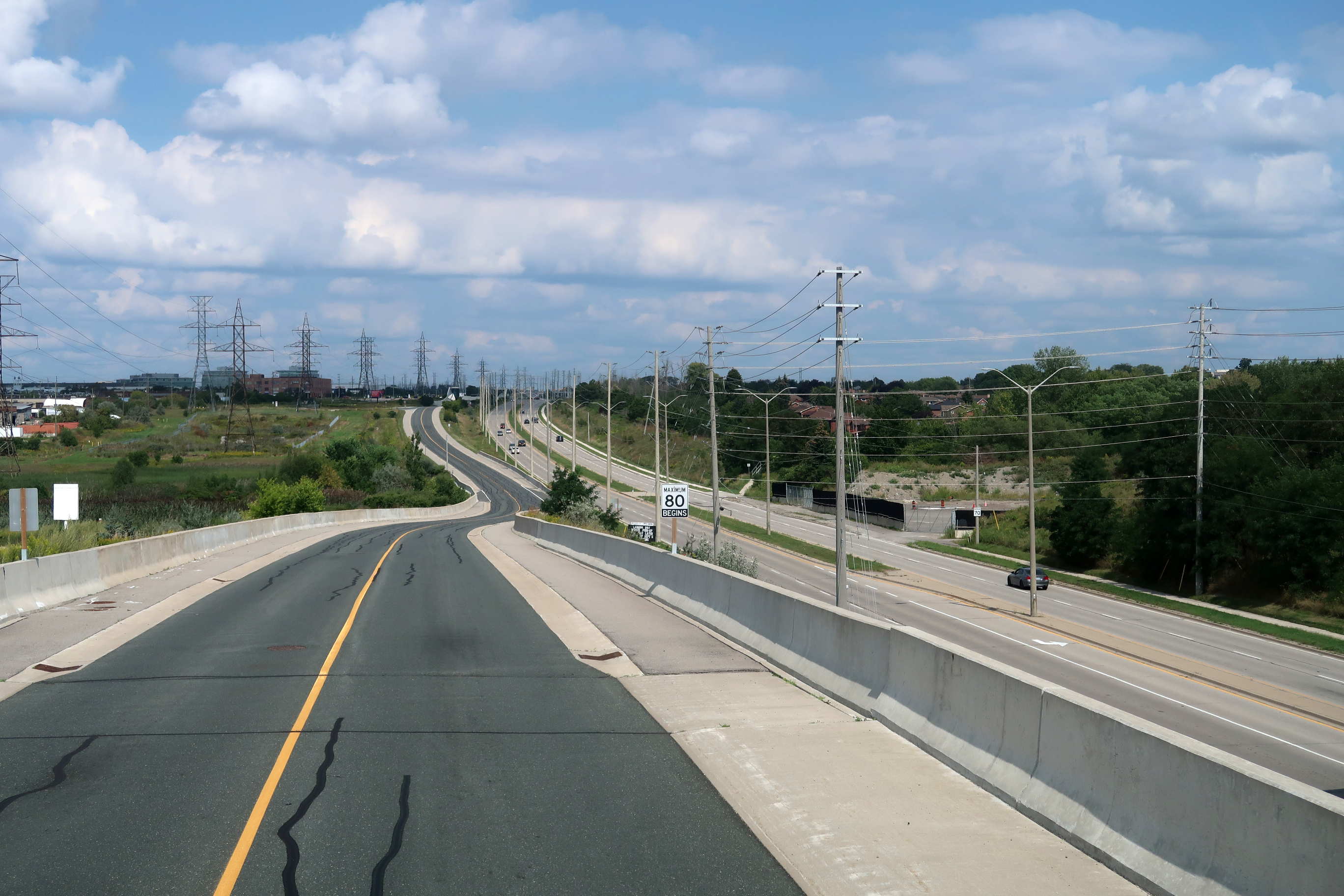
Mississauga Transitway running alongside Eastgate Parkway

The Mississauga Transitway is a bus rapid transit (BRT) system in Mississauga, Ontario, Canada. It comprises a series of purpose-constructed bus-only roadways, as well as reserved lanes on existing city streets and portions of Highway 403, that together form a continuous 18 km (11 mi) route spanning most of the city from Winston Churchill Boulevard in the west to the junction of Highways 401 and 427 in the east on the border with Toronto. Service on the Transitway is provided by MiWay and GO Transit, with some stations providing connections to Brampton Transit and Toronto Transit Commission (TTC) bus services.

== History ==
Originally proposed in the 1970s, the Mississauga Transit plan has evolved over time. At least eighteen studies were made between 1970 and 1992. In the 1990s, a serious proposal intended to build a "transitway" from Ridgeway Drive at the very western edge of the city; this was eventually revised to its current state, with construction beginning in November 2010. To save money, the stations at Ridgeway Drive, Creditview Road, Mavis Road, and Hurontario Street were dropped, as well as a portion of the proposed busway was replaced with existing roads between Erin Mills and Hurontario.

The first stretch of the present Transitway opened between Hurontario Street and Dixie Road on November 17, 2014. Other remaining sections faced delays, and were open in stages until the eastern terminus, Renforth, was opened on November 22, 2017. There were plans to eventually extend Transitway service to a new regional bus terminal at the Kipling subway station in southern Etobicoke, which came to fruition with the opening of the Kipling Bus Terminal on January 4, 2021.

== Design and operation ==
The Mississauga Transitway consists of two busways and bus-priority lanes. The western busway segment parallels Highway 403 from the western terminus at Winston Churchill Boulevard to Erin Mills Parkway. From there, buses use dedicated shoulder lanes on Highway 403 and Centre View Drive to reach MiWay's City Centre Transit Terminal on Rathburn Road. The longer eastern busway begins east of Hurontario Street, paralleling Highway 403 to Cawthra Road and then following Eastgate Parkway on its north and west side to Eglinton Avenue, and Eglinton on its north side to the eastern terminus at Renforth Drive at the boundary with Toronto.

Bus services along the Mississauga Transitway operate similarly to that of the Ottawa Transitway network, using a mixture of express and local routes that call at intermediate stations constructed along the route. Because the Transitway does not directly connect to any major transit hubs other than the City Centre Terminal, all routes that use the Transitway travel in mixed traffic to reach other outlying termini such as Kipling subway station.

The Transitway is shared by MiWay standard and articulated buses for intra-city travel, along with GO Transit-operated highway coaches and double-decker buses along inter-city routes. MiWay buses operating along the Transitway stop at all stations by request, while GO Transit routes only make stops at Winston Churchill, Erin Mills, Dixie, and Renforth stations (depending on the route).

=== Funding and construction ===
The Transitway project, estimated to cost $259 million, was funded as part of the Government of Ontario's MoveOntario 2020 plan, with both the federal and provincial governments contributing up to a total of $173 million. Construction responsibilities were divided between Metrolinx and the City of Mississauga: Metrolinx was responsible for the western segment between Winston Churchill and Erin Mills, a portion of the eastern segment between Hurontario and Cawthra, and Renforth Station; while the city was responsible for all other stations and segments. Construction on the eastern segment began in November 2010, while Metrolinx launched construction of the western segment in November 2013.

Including construction, land, design and bus acquisition, Mississauga’s cost was at least $328 million. Metrolinx 's cost was over $200 million. The federal government contributed $83 million, bringing the total to approximately $611 million.

== Routes using the transitway ==
Transitway map

=== MiWay ===
With the opening of the first phase on November 17, 2014, MiWay adjusted three of its routes to use the eastern section of the corridor, initially operating Monday through Saturday from 4:30 AM to 10:30 PM. A fourth route, 110 University, began using the Transitway lanes on Highway 403 on September 7, 2015, with the opening of Erin Mills station, the only Transitway station served by this route.

With the opening of the new Winston Churchill station on January 8, 2017, route 109 Meadowvale Express implemented a new Sunday service, expanding service along the entire length of the Mississauga Transitway to seven days a week.

Route	Service Type	Terminus		Service Span
107 Malton Express	Express	City Centre Transit Terminal	Humber College Bus Terminal	All week
109 Meadowvale Express	Express	Meadowvale Town Centre Bus Terminal	Kipling Bus Terminal	All week
110 University Express	Express	City Centre Transit Terminal	Clarkson GO Station	All week
110A University Express	Express	City Centre Transit Terminal	University of Toronto Mississauga	Monday–Friday
135 Eglinton Express	Express	Kipling Bus Terminal	Winston Churchill station	Rush Hour Only

=== GO Transit ===
Current GO Transit bus routes that use the Transitway include the following:

Route		Stations served
19	Mississauga / North York	Square One, Dixie, Renforth
25	Waterloo / Mississauga	Winston Churchill, Erin Mills, Square One
29	Guelph / Mississauga	Winston Churchill, Erin Mills, Square One, Dixie, Renforth
40	Hamilton / Richmond Hill	Dixie, Renforth
41	407 West	Erin Mills, Square One
47	407 West	Erin Mills, Square One
56	407 East	Erin Mills, Square One
94	Pickering / Mississauga	Square One, Dixie, Renforth

== Stations ==
There are twelve stations along the transitway. Those along the BRT portion of the route are accessed by street entrances, with Kiss & Ride areas at most stations and Park & Ride lots at selected stations. All stations are wheelchair-accessible, have heated waiting areas, and similar to the Züm service operated by Brampton Transit, loading platforms designed for level boarding. Transitway stations are unstaffed and the bus platforms are not fare-paid zones. Fare payment is done when boarding buses as with on-street routes, and either tapping a Presto card or a paper transfer is required for connecting between buses.

The following is a list of stations, from west to east:

Station	Opened	GO Transit stop	Parking	Kiss and ride	Notes
Winston Churchill	January 2, 2017	Yes	300 spaces	Yes	
Erin Mills	September 7, 2015	Yes	300 spaces	Yes	connection to City Centre via Highway 403's HOV lane and bus bypass shoulders
City Centre / Square One	November 1997	Yes (Note: Connects to GO Transit at Square One Bus Terminal across the road)	200 spaces	Yes	inter-regional transit terminal; connection to 502 Züm Main; connection to future Hurontario LRT
Central Parkway	November 17, 2014	No		Yes	
Cawthra	November 17, 2014	No	60 spaces	Yes	
Tomken	November 17, 2014	No		Yes	
Dixie	November 17, 2014	Yes	170 spaces	Yes	
Tahoe	February 16, 2016	No		No	originally Fieldgate.
Etobicoke Creek	February 16, 2016	No		No	originally Fieldgate North
Spectrum	May 1, 2017	No		No	
Orbitor	May 1, 2017	No		No	
Renforth	November 22, 2017	Yes		No	connection to Toronto Transit Commission buses; connects to Kipling subway station via Highway 427; future connection to an extension of the TTC's Line 5 Eglinton

A multi-modal interchange with the western extension of the TTC's Line 5 Eglinton is currently under construction at Renforth station. A third phase will terminate at the nearby Pearson International Airport. The first phase of Line 5 opened on February 8, 2026, as far west as Mount Dennis station at Weston Road, with the extension to Renforth being slated to open circa 2030.

The original plans for the connection featured a full-service below grade BRT station, but only an at-grade median surface stop for the LRT, requiring transferring passengers to cross Commerce Boulevard and descend a set of stairs to access the BRT. As of 2020 however, in an addendum to the Line 5 extension, the addendum showed the future Renforth LRT station partially at-grade and the station located off-street on the north side of Eglinton, north of the transitway terminal.

== Ridership ==
Ridership
Year	Ridership
2017	At least 5 million
2019	6,083,846
2020	574,956
2021	2,266,910
2022	2,605,701
2023	4,458,636

== Criticism ==
Due to the bankruptcy of contractor B. Gottardo, Tomken and Dixie stations were not complete until two years after officially opening. Councillers Chris Foneseca, George Carlson, and Carolyn Parrish complained about the half-completed state of the stations, with Parrish saying "[The station] looks derelict... it's disgusting."

Looking at the Erin Mills station, in a paper for Environmental Studies at York University, Amar Shubhanan Lad wrote that "Pedestrian and cycling connections in particular are poor, inaccessible and uninviting to try." Lad also found that a previously existing pedestrian shortcut to the station had been closed at local residents' request.

Criticism has been levied against the Transitway for its location, with critics stating that the ridership potential along the corridor is poor. Gil Penalosa, a former business analyst for the City of Mississauga, considered the Transitway's location a mistake. "It should have been built along Burnhamthorpe, the heart of the city.” Jason Slaughter, who runs the YouTube channel Not Just Bikes, stated "The biggest problem with the Transitway is the location of the stops, which are not in walkable areas."

== See also ==
- Public transport in Canada
