= MiWay =

Public transit agency in Mississauga, Ontario

Mississauga Transit

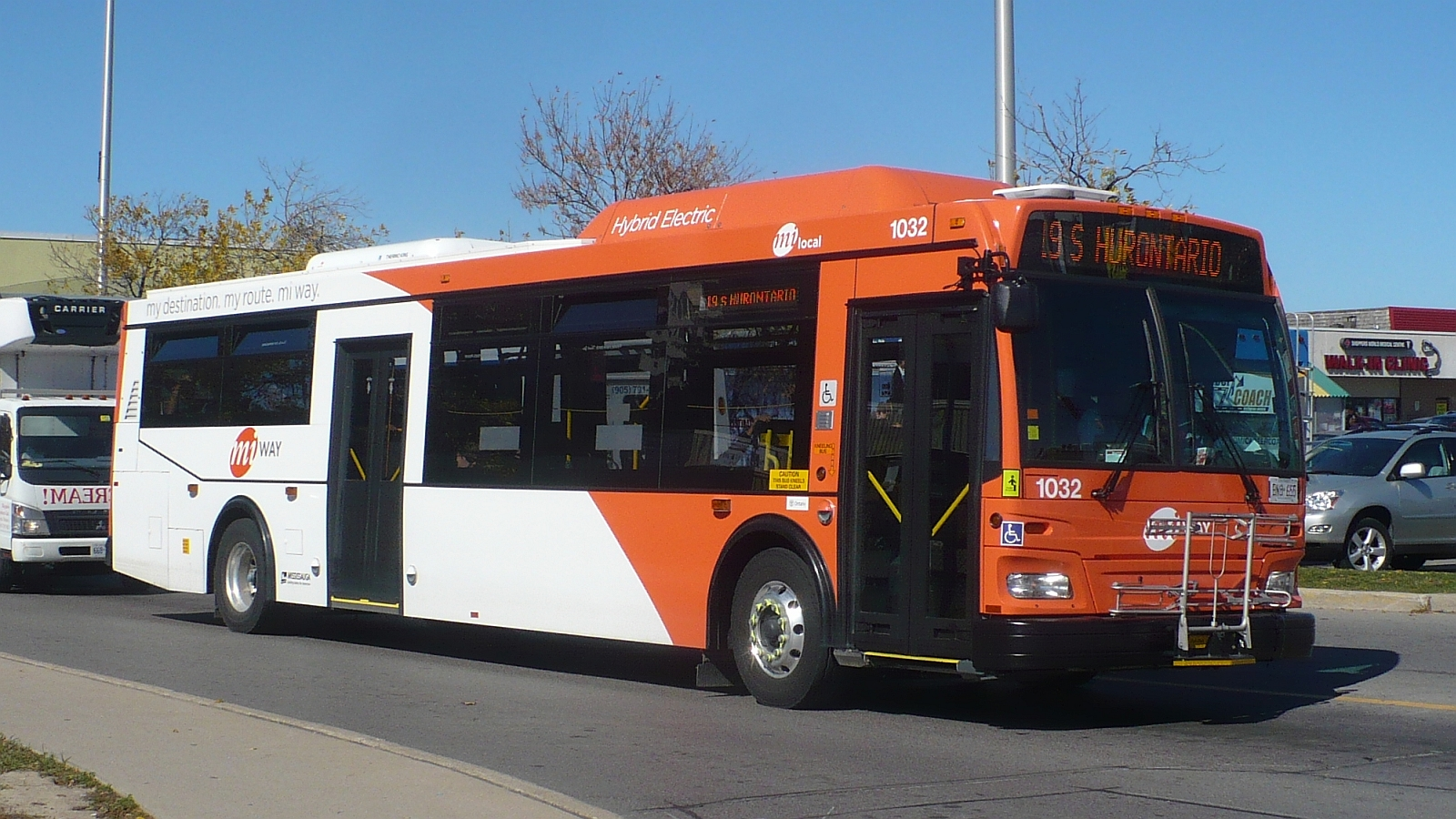
- A MiWay Orion VII hybrid bus
- Founded: 1969; 57 years ago
- Headquarters: 3484 Semenyk Court
- Locale: Mississauga, Ontario, Canada
- Service area: Greater Toronto Area
- Service type: Local, bus rapid transit, and Express bus service
- Routes: 55 local 10 express 9 high school 1 TTC-contracted
- Stops: 3,223
- Hubs: 28 (8 outside the city)
- Depots: 2
- Fleet: 499
- Daily ridership: 162,000 (weekdays, Q2 2026)
- Annual ridership: 52,141,400 (2025)
- Fuel type: Diesel and hybrid electric
- Operator: City of Mississauga
- Chief executive: Maureen Cosyn Heath
- Website: mississauga.ca/miway-transit/

Former Mississauga Transit logo

Like most other city-owned vehicles, transit buses are also identified by a version of the corporate logo. However the new city logo was applied beginning in 2016.

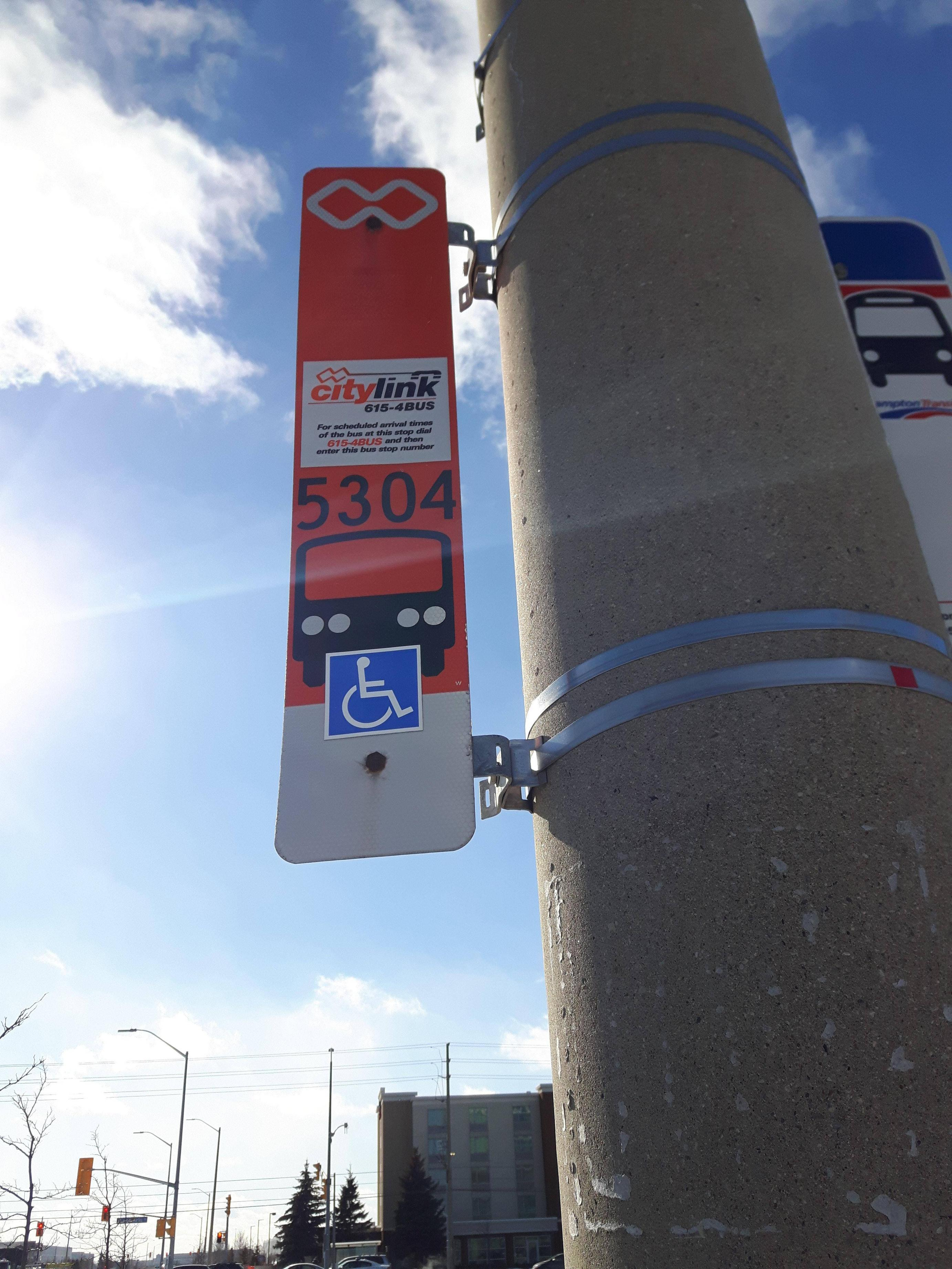
MiWay bus stop 5304 located at the intersection of Hurontario and Courtneypark. MiWay's 57 Courtneypark services this stop along with Brampton Transit's 7 Kennedy.

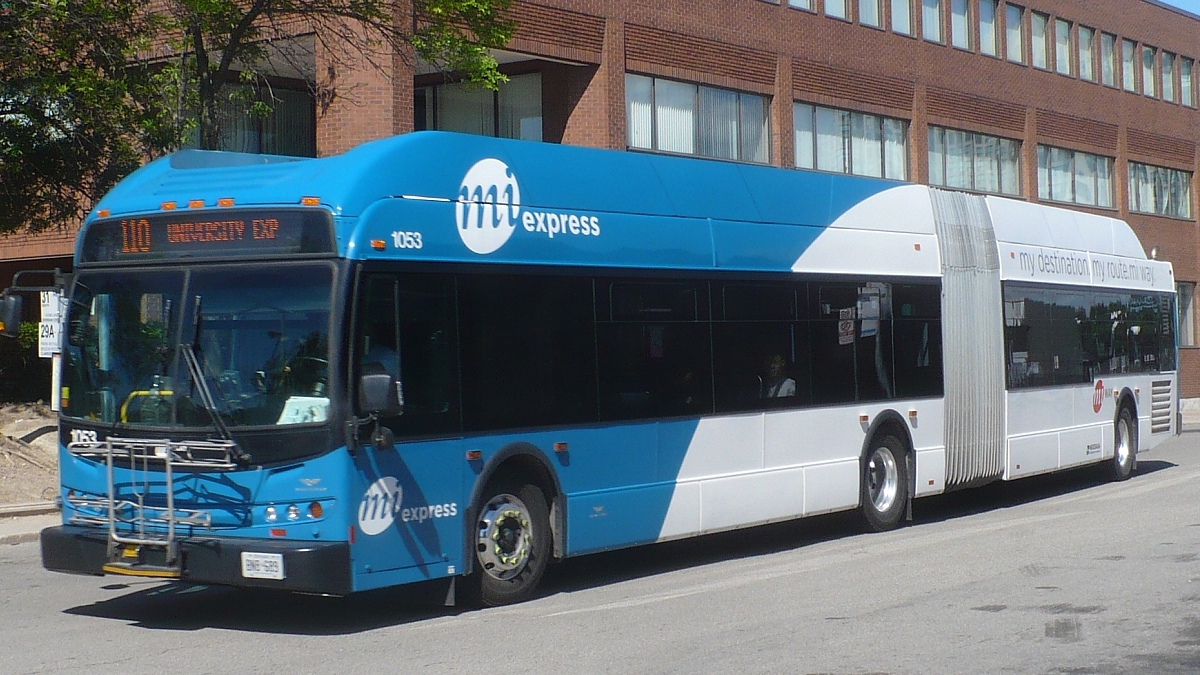
An express bus in the blue MiExpress livery used between 2010-23, in 2012

Mississauga Transit, branded as MiWay (/ˈmaɪ.weɪ/, MY-way) since 2010, is a public transit agency serving Mississauga, Ontario, Canada, and responsible to the City of Mississauga's Transportation and Works Department. MiWay services consist of two types of bus routes: local buses that make frequent stops and express buses between major destinations, formerly branded as MiLocal and MiExpress, respectively. MiWay is the primary operator along the Mississauga Transitway, a dedicated east–west bus-only roadway. The system operates over 3,223 stops.

MiWay's routes connect with GO Transit along with Brampton Transit to the north, Oakville Transit to the southwest, Milton Transit to the northwest, Toronto Transit Commission to the east and York Region Transit to the northeast. In 2024, MiWay's annual boardings totalled to 58.4 million passengers, making it the third largest public transit provider in Ontario and seventh largest in Canada.

MiWay is a member of the Canadian Urban Transit Association.

== History ==
Public transit in Mississauga was first operated by Charterways Limited as Mississauga Transit Systems with four buses in 1969. It was acquired by the city's newly formed Mississauga Transit in 1974, incorporating the former towns of Mississauga, Port Credit and Streetsville. Services began on November 1, 1973.

It later acquired routes formerly operated by others, such as;

- The Toronto Transit Commission's (TTC) 74 Port Credit bus, in February 1976, that had operated on Lakeshore Road from Long Branch since 1935. This succeeded a former interurban railway, dating back to 1892 as the Toronto and Mimico Electric Railway and Light Company.
- Gray Coach Lines, and later GO Transit, also served intercity routes on Dundas and Hurontario Streets, both being semi-rural provincial highways before the construction of later freeways such as Highways 401, 403, and 410.
- Malton was served by the TTC's contracted 58 Malton bus until 2014, when the route was replaced by the TTC's 52 Lawrence West route. Local services in Malton were provided since 1969 and expanded after 1973.

In the late 1990s, a growing number of Mississauga Transit buses using Burnhamthorpe Road in Toronto to reach Islington subway station were causing congestion while not serving local Toronto residents along the route. This led to a resident blockade in an incident known as "the Battle of the Buses". During the political dispute between Toronto and Mississauga city councils, the TTC commissioners responded by blocking Mississauga Transit buses from using Islington station's transit terminal from 1998 to 2001 when a compromise was reached.

Mississauga Transit was rebranded MiWay on October 4, 2010. New MiWay-branded hybrid buses entered service, with orange MiLocal buses on local routes and blue MiExpress buses on express routes. Advertisements were placed on buses and shelters in September 2010 to introduce users to the new branding. Older buses using the old branding continued use until the final fleets were retired in late 2025. Service levels did not change with the rebranding. The reason for the company's new name is twofold: "Mi" could be interpreted as standing for Mississauga, and it is also a homophone for "My", suggesting possession. The system's legal name did not change.

By December 1, 2011, MiWay's bus fleet was fully low-floor and accessible. As of October 22, 2012, bus stop pads have been put at all MiWay bus stops. This allowed the entire system to become fully accessible.

Beginning in 2016, the City of Mississauga's logo was updated, and most buses (needing to go in for repairs), had the new logo applied over the old one, and all buses ordered from 2016 onwards had the new city logo.

On April 29, 2019, 24-hour service was introduced on four bus routes.

In October 2023, MiWay began phasing out the blue MiExpress buses in their fleet by repainting existing vehicles to the standard MiWay orange livery and painting newly purchased hybrid-electric buses orange.

== Services ==
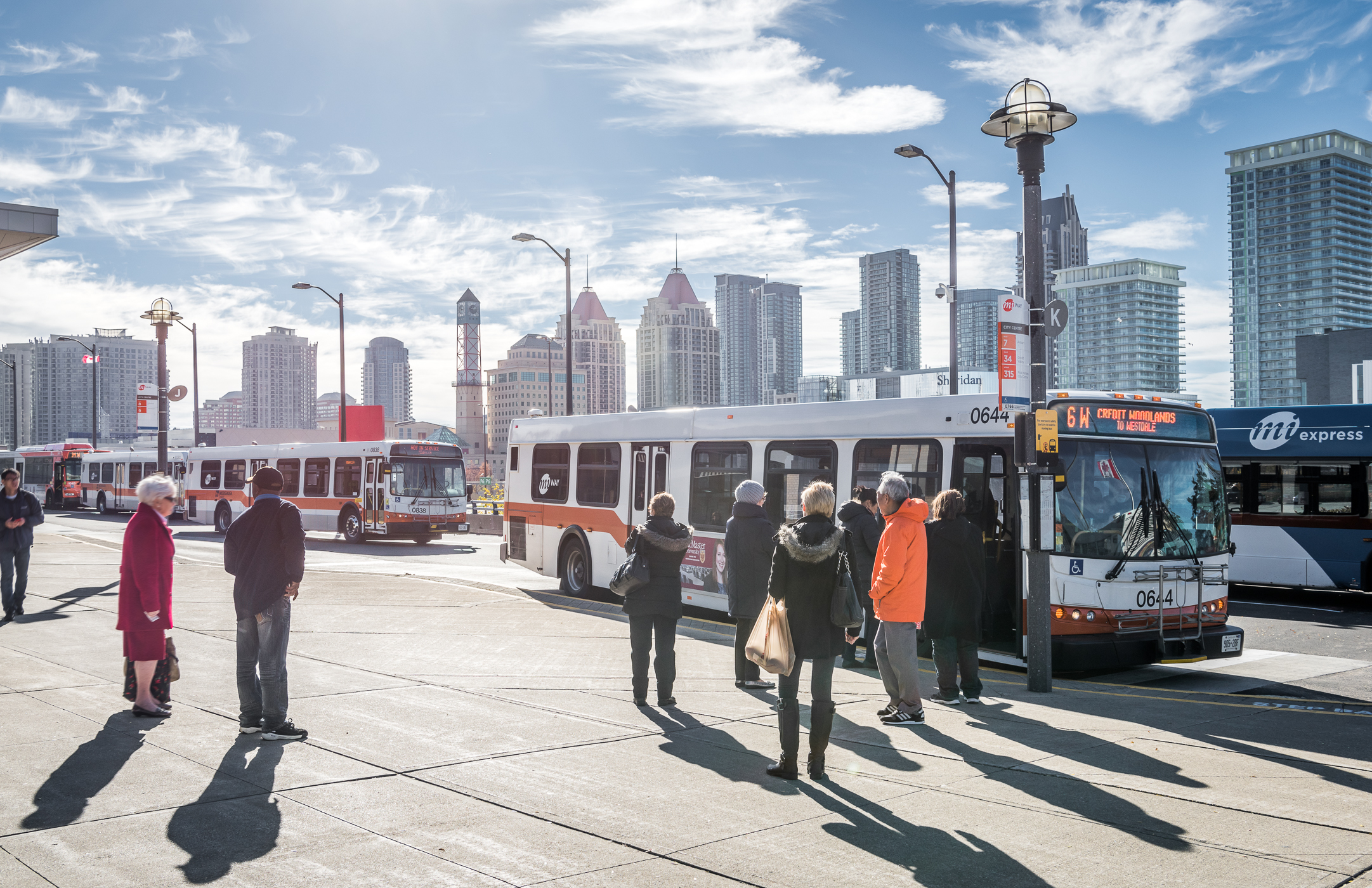
MiWay buses at the City Centre Transit Terminal

=== Local Transit ===
MiWay operates over 60 fixed-route bus routes. Services are divided into three categories, local, express, and high school routes. All buses are wheelchair-accessible.

==== TTC-contracted route ====
One Toronto Transit Commission (TTC) route, 52B/52D Lawrence West, is operated by the TTC contracted on behalf of the City of Mississauga. The fare payment method is the same as for regular MiWay buses: via a Presto card, contactless credit or debit card, or cash. As a result of the provincial One Fare program, transfers between the two systems are now free, and a second fare is no longer charged for passengers riding to or from Toronto provided that the customer uses Presto, credit or debit card within two hours of paying the initial fare.

From 2002 to 2010, another route 32B Eglinton West, operated to Explorer Drive in a similar arrangement.

=== Rapid transit ===
==== Bus rapid transit ====
The Mississauga Transitway is a mostly grade-separated twelve-stop bus rapid transit (BRT) line running across Mississauga East-West alongside or on Highway 403 and Eglinton Avenue, passing through the City Centre. MiWay express services as well as GO Transit regional bus services utilize the Transitway. The line also connects to buses to Pearson Airport at Renforth station.

== Rider Experience ==
=== Accessibility ===
MiWay operates low-floor, wheelchair-accessible buses. The last high-floor bus was retired on December 1, 2011. A separate transit service for the disabled called Transhelp is operated by the Peel Regional Municipality.

=== Schedules ===
Mississauga Transit's paper "Ride Schedules" were discontinued in 2004. From 2005 onward, all timetables were only available from the system's website.

Schedules and trip planning are available via Triplinx, a Metrolinx-provided tool for transit services in the GTHA.

=== Fares ===
As of July 1, 2026, MiWay's cash fare is $4.50 for riders aged 13+ without a Presto card. Customers can also pay their MiWay bus fare by tapping a contactless credit or debit card on the Presto fare reader and the current cash fare price is deducted. Presto cards have been accepted throughout the entire MiWay system since May 30, 2011. Since July 29, 2019, riders can also use their Presto cards to pay both their MiWay and Toronto Transit Commission (TTC) fares on TTC-operated bus routes 52B and 52D. Credit and debit cards including those loaded on mobile wallets are accepted on the Presto reader as of August 11, 2022. A fare of $4.50 is deducted (regardless of age or occupation). Children ages 0-12 can ride all MiWay bus routes fare-free when travelling with an accompanying adult. Seniors ages 65 and over, along with Canadian Armed Forces (CAF) veteran members, must tap a valid Presto card to ride the MiWay bus for free, otherwise they are charged the full cash fare. Additionally, children travelling alone must also tap a valid child Presto card when boarding the bus.

Cash-paying customers can ask the bus driver for a printed paper transfer after depositing a cash fare into the fare box. For customers paying a single-ride fare with Presto, credit, or debit cards, an electronic transfer is automatically stored on their card after their initial tap-on.

Transfers are valid for two hours on any route in any direction, including those to and from other GTHA transit service providers under the aforementioned One Fare program: TTC, Brampton Transit, Burlington Transit, Oakville Transit, Milton Transit, and York Region Transit from the time of issue. For free 2-hour transfers between MiWay and TTC, customers must use a physical or digital Presto card, credit card or debit card, as free transfers between TTC and MiWay are not available with cash fares and paper transfers.

==== Presto card fares ====
Fare category	Presto MiWay single-ride	Presto MiWay weekly fare cap	Presto MiWay monthly pass	Expiry	Notes
Child; Ages 6 to 12	$0.00			On 13th birthday	Children ages 6–12 can ride free on MiWay when they tap their Presto card with a child's fare type or are travelling with an accompanying adult.; Does not automatically upgrade to youth fare class at expiry; Automatically resets to adult fare class at expiry; Requires visit to a Presto customer service location to be converted to the youth fare class
Youth; Ages 13 to 19	$2.90	Free after 12 full fares are paid	$145.00	On 20th birthday	Automatic upgrade to adult fare class at expiry; ID may be required
Adult	$3.50	Free after 12 full fares are paid	$145.00		Default setting for unregistered cards; Does not automatically upgrade to senior at age 65; Requires visit to a Presto customer service location to be converted to the senior fare class
Senior; Ages 65 and over	$0.00				Seniors must use a valid Presto card with a senior fare type to ride fare-free on MiWay buses, otherwise they will need to pay $4.50 using cash or with a contactless credit or debit card.; Senior photo ID may be required.
Canadian Armed Forces (CAF) and veteran members	$0.00				Must use a Presto card with a "Veterans/CAF" fare type to ride free on MiWay buses; otherwise they are required to pay $4.50 using cash or with a contactless credit or debit card.; Requires visit to a Presto customer service location to be converted to the "Veterans/CAF" fare type.

==== Presto programs ====
In 2007, MiWay was the first test site for the new Presto card; Presto was adopted across the entire MiWay system in May 2011. Since launching the Presto card in Mississauga, MiWay has issued more than 9,000 cards; as of 2012, they were being used for more than 2.4 million trips within the system. MiWay offers two programs exclusively for Presto cardholders:

- GO Transit co-fare: Since March 14, 2022, Customers who pay their fares by Presto or contactless credit and debit card and transfer from GO Transit onto connecting MiWay buses get free admission so long as the customer swipes a Presto, credit or debit card on the Presto fare readers onto the connecting MiWay bus within the 3-hour transfer window. Passengers transferring from MiWay to GO Transit services will also be reimbursed the difference between the MiWay fare and the co-fare upon disembarking from GO Transit.
- weekly fare capping: When Presto cardholders have paid for 11 regular MiWay fares in a calendar week, they are able to ride for free for the rest of the week. Only paid trips originating on MiWay counts towards the MiWay weekly fare cap. The weekly ride count resets to zero on Mondays.

==== Smart Commute discount program ====
MiWay also offers discounted adult transit passes to employees of the members of Smart Commute Mississauga and Smart Commute Pearson Airport Area. Transit passes are automatically paid by payroll deduction.

Employer discount	City discount	Total discount	Monthly pass cost
None	None	None	$132.00
15%	5%	20%	$105.60
25% or more	15%	40% or more	$79.20 or less

== Operations ==
Operations are funded by the city's municipal government, which allocates tax revenues to the transit operator. In 2022, the city allocated almost $90 million for Miway's budget.

MiWay's bus drivers, garage maintenance, and service workers are represented by Amalgamated Transit Union Local 1572

=== Transit Enforcement Services ===
Mississauga Transit Enforcement Officers are members of the City's Corporate Security Team. They are designated as Municipal Law Enforcement Officers and are responsible for:

- Patrolling the MiWay system
- Maintaining the integrity of the fare system by conducting inspections in fare-access areas
- Deterring crime and anti-social behaviour
- Maintaining a presence at City Centre Transit Terminal
- Providing customer service throughout the system
- Providing emergency first aid where applicable
- Enforcing City of Mississauga Transit By-Law 425-03 on Transit properties
- Liaising with other Transit Enforcement Agencies (Metrolinx Special Constables, TTC Special Constables)

Officers can be identified by their dark coloured uniforms that bare the crest of a Mississauga Municipal Law Enforcement Officer. Their fleet consists of Ford Escape Hybrids with the MiWay corporate logo and "Transit Enforcement" written on all sides.

=== Incidents ===
==== June 2023 bus crash ====
On June 8, 2023, a MiWay bus was involved in an multi-vehicle collision near the intersection of Derry and Rexwood Roads that killed one person and injured 8 others. Video evidence showed the bus running into a lane of cars waiting at a red light from behind. The operator of the bus was immediately placed on leave following the incident, and was charged with dangerous operation causing death in October 2023.

==== September 2022 Maintenance Incident ====
On September 17, 2022, a maintenance worker was critically injured at the E.J. Dowling Transit Facility. The worker was taken to Credit Valley Hospital but did not survive. The worker had been performing maintenance on a bus prior to being pinned by a bus and fatally injured.

== Facilities ==
=== Major Facilities ===
Facility	Address & coordinates	Opened	Notes
Administration	3484 Semenyk Court; 43°34′5″N 79°39′13″W	2014	Headquarters
E. J. Dowling Transit Facility	975 Central Parkway West; 43°34′11″N 79°39′17″W	2015	Operations; renamed in honour of Mississauga Transit's first manager Ed Dowling in 2015.
Central Parkway Garage	975 Central Parkway West; 43°34′11″N 79°39′17″W	1977	Storage for 400 or 500 buses. A new bus repair depot was added in 2008.
Malton Garage	6780 Professional Court; 43°42′23″N 79°37′48″W	1992	Storage for 110 buses
City Centre Transit Terminal	200 Rathburn Road West; 43°35′38″N 79°38′47.6″W	1997	

=== Transitway stations ===
For more information on the transitway, see the Bus rapid transit section. All MiWay routes are wheelchair-accessible.

Station	Address	Routes	Other connections
Cawthra	775 Eastgate Parkway	107, 109	
Central Parkway	4325 Central Parkway East	10, 20, 53, 107, 109	
Dixie	4440 Dixie Road	5, 73, 74, 107, 109, 135	Brampton Transit, GO Transit
Erin Mills	4430 Erin Mills Parkway	46, 48, 109, 110	GO Transit
Etobicoke Creek	1915 Eglinton Avenue East	35, 107, 109, 135	
Orbitor	5015 Orbitor Drive	35, 107, 109, 135	
Renforth	5001 Commerce Boulevard	7, 24, 35, 39, 43, 57/57A, 74, 107, 109, 135	GO Transit, TTC
Spectrum	5005 Spectrum Way	35, 107, 109, 135	
Tahoe	4650 Tahoe Boulevard	107, 109, 135	
Tomken	4450 Tomken Road	51, 107, 109	
Winston Churchill	4310 Winston Churchill Boulevard	36, 45/45A, 109, 135	GO Transit

=== Terminals and junctions ===
All MiWay routes are wheelchair-accessible.

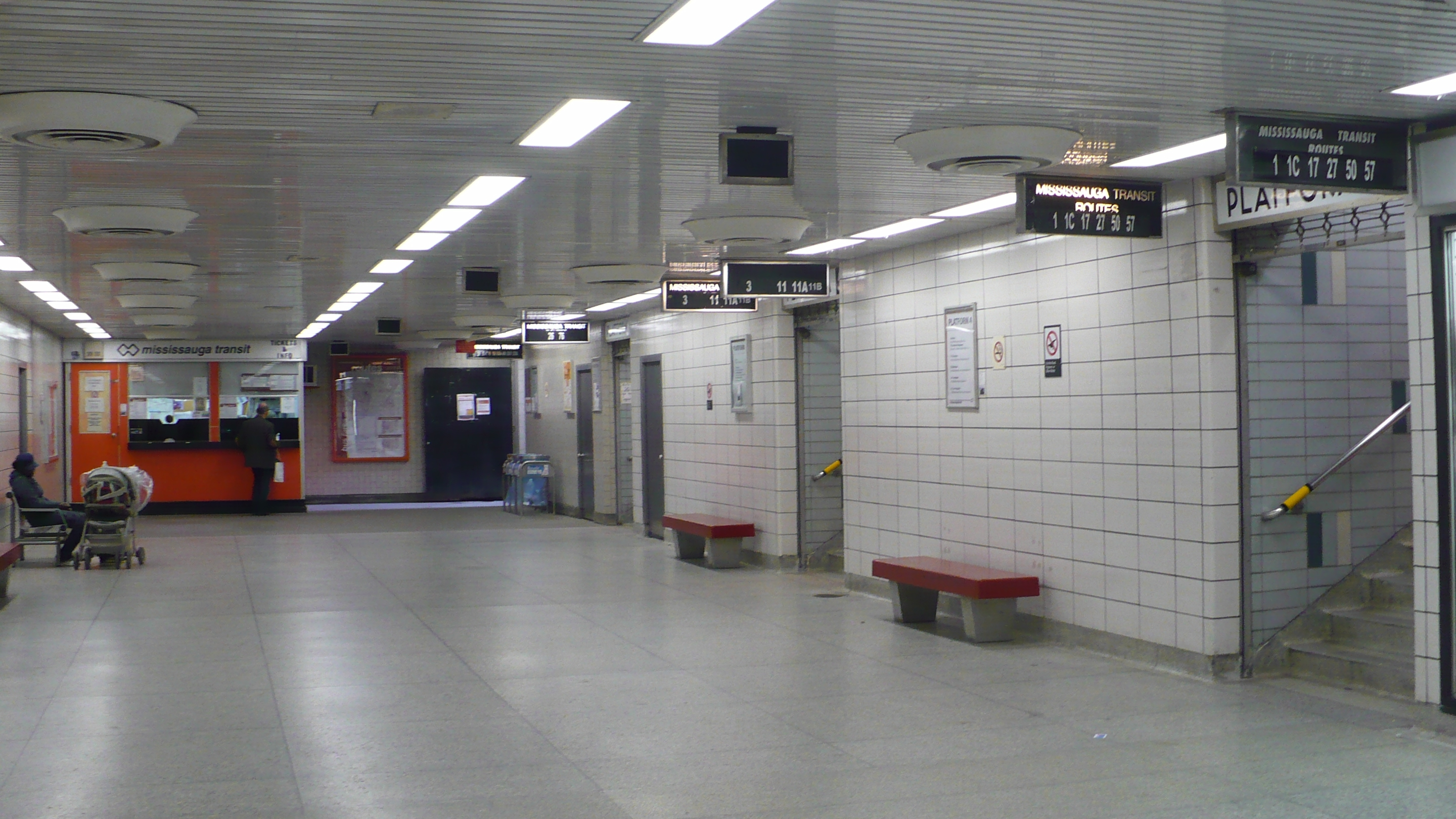
Former MiWay service booth and platforms at Islington station, before MiWay connections were moved to Kipling Station

Location	Routes	Other connections
Brampton Gateway Terminal	103	Brampton Transit (with the terminal), GO Transit (at Main Street)
Churchill Meadows Community Centre	9, 35	
City Centre Transit Terminal	2, 3, 6, 7, 8, 9, 10, 17, 20, 28, 61, 66, 68	26, 107, 109, 110 and Brampton Transit (Züm) (at Rathburn Road), GO Transit (at Station Gate)
Credit Valley Hospital	9, 48	35 & 135 (at Eglinton Avenue), 46 (at Erin Mills Parkway), GO Transit (at Erin Mills Parkway and Eglinton Avenue)
Dixie Outlet Mall	4, 5, 31	
Erin Mills Town Centre Bus Terminal	9, 13, 46, 48, 49	35 & 135 (at Eglinton Avenue)
Humber College Bus Terminal North Campus	22, 107	Brampton Transit, GO Transit, TTC, YRT buses and Line 6 Finch West LRT (on Humber Polytechnic North Campus)
Islington Station	26 (on-street at Islington & Bloor)	TTC buses and Line 2 Bloor–Danforth subway.
Kipling Bus Terminal	1, 3, 11, 20, 26, 35, 70, 71, 101, 108, 109, 126, 135	GO Transit, TTC buses and Line 2 Bloor–Danforth subway. The only major hub outside the city limits.
Meadowvale Town Centre Transit Terminal	10, 13, 38, 39, 42, 43, 44, 45/45A, 46, 48, 90, 109	GO Transit (at Aquitaine Avenue)
Sheridan Centre Bus Terminal	29, 71	13, 45A, 110 (at Erin Mills Parkway)
Sheridan College Davis Campus	61, 66	18 & 57/57A (at McLaughlin Road), Brampton Transit
Sherway Gardens	4	TTC
South Common Centre Bus Terminal	13, 26, 29, 36, 48, 110	
Toronto Pearson International Airport	7, 57A (Infield Cargo Area), 24 & 107 (Viscount Terminal Link station)	Brampton Transit (Terminal 1; Viscount Terminal Link station), GO Transit (Terminal 1), TTC (Terminals 1 & 3; Viscount Terminal Link station)
Trillium Health Centre Queensway West & Hurontario Street	28, 103	4 (at Queensway), 2 (at Hurontario Street)
University of Toronto Mississauga	1, 44, 48, 101, 110, 126	Brampton Transit (at Inner Circle and Residence Road intersection)
Westdale Mall Dundas Street West & Erindale Station Road	1, 6, 101	
Westwood Square Bus Terminal	7, 11, 15, 16/16A, 18, 22, 24, 30, 42, 107	Brampton Transit, TTC
Woodbine Centre	11 & 30 (at Rexdale Boulevard)	TTC (at Queens Plate Drive)

=== GO Transit stations ===
All MiWay routes are wheelchair-accessible.

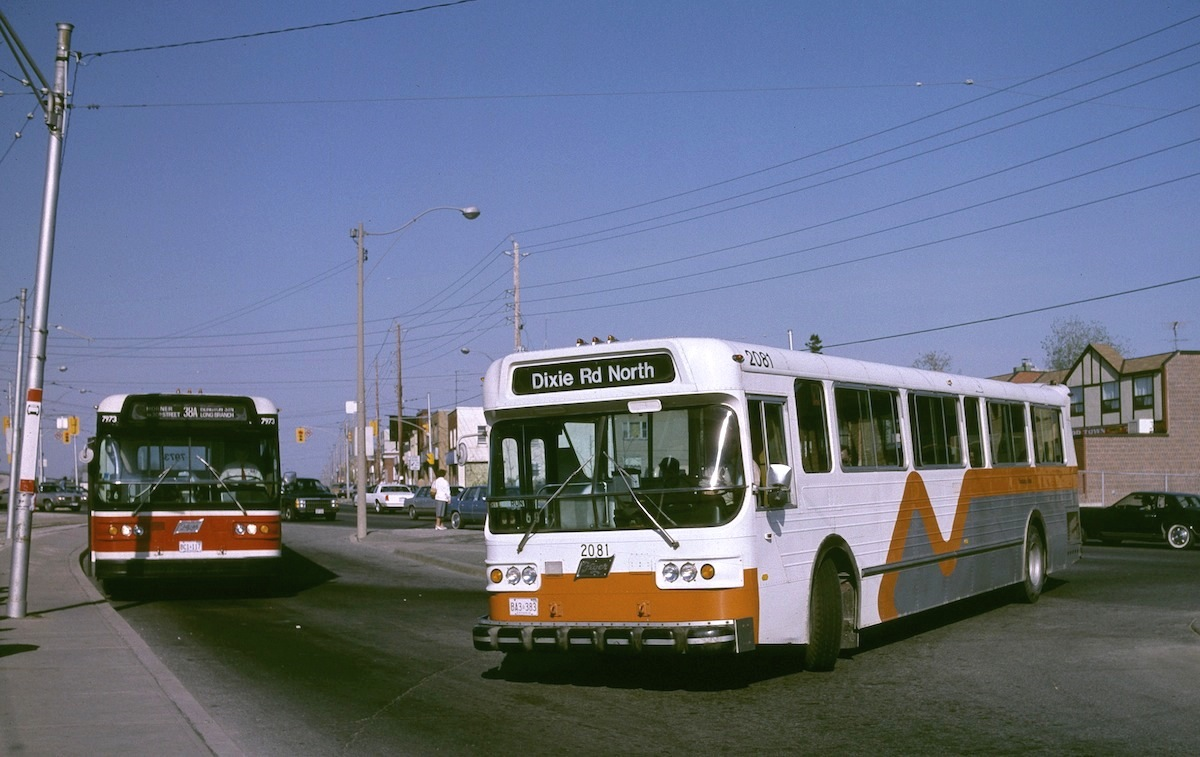
A Mississauga Flyer D800 bus meeting a TTC bus at Long Branch Loop in 1987

Location	Routes	Other connections
Bramalea	51	Brampton Transit
Clarkson	13, 14/14A, 23, 29, 45/45A, 110	Oakville Transit
Cooksville	4, 28, 38, 53	2, 103 (at Hurontario Street)
Dixie	31, 51	5 (nearest on-street route)
Erindale	9	6, 26, 126 (at Burnhamthorpe Road); 38 (at Creditview Road)
Hurontario & Hwy 407 Park and Ride	17, 53	Brampton Transit
Kipling	1, 3, 11, 20, 26, 35, 70, 71, 101, 108, 109, 126, 135	TTC connection available at Kipling station
Lisgar	38	Brampton Transit, Milton Transit
Long Branch Long Branch TTC Loop	5, 23, 31	TTC
Malton	30	18, 42 (at Derry Road); Brampton Transit (at Derry Road)
Meadowvale	90	44 (at Aquitaine Avenue)
Port Credit	2, 8, 14/14A, 23	
Streetsville	49A	44 (at Queen Street)

== Fleet ==
Fleet numbers	Built	Builder	Model	Status	Notes
1–3	1989	OBI	02.501	Retired	Mississauga City Centre shuttle
2001–2002	1969	GMC	TDH-3502	Retired	2002 last TDH-3502 built
2003	1969	GMC	TDH-3502	Retired	
2004	1968	GMDD	TDH-5303	Retired	Ex–Skinner-Sun Parlor Charterways
2005–2009	1971	GMDD	T6H-5305	Retired	Sent to Brampton Transit in 1989
2012	1970–1971	VanHool	Unibus	Retired	Secondhand minibus. Sent to Charterways Transportation.
2010–2014	1974	GMC	T6H-4523N	Retired	
2015–2020	1970	GMC	TDH-3301	Retired	Ex–North Bay Transit; Deutz air-cooled engines
2021 (:1)	1960	CC&F	TD-43	Retired	Ex–Regina Transit
2021 (:2)	1973	GMDD	T6H-5307N	Retired	Ex-Charterways
2022–2027	1974	GMC	T6H-4523A	Retired	Ex–Sioux City Bus Lines
2028		FORD		Retired	
2029–2031	1973	GMDD	T6H-5307N	Retired	Ex-Charterways
2032–2037	1973	GMDD	T6H-5307N	Retired	Double-stream exit doors from this order onwards
2038–2049	1974	GMDD	T6H-5307N	Retired	
2050–2069	1976	GMDD	T6H-5307N	Retired	
2070–2081	1976	FIL	D800A	Retired	
2082–2087	1978	OBI	01.501	Retired	Converted to CNG in 1992. Sent to Burlington Transit.
2085–2089	1954–1956	GMC	TDH-4512	Retired	Ex–Toronto Transit Commission
2090–2099	1954–1956	GMC	TDH-4512	Retired	Ex–Toronto Transit Commission
2101–2120	1977	GMDD	T6H-5307N	Retired	
2121–2144	1978	FIL	D800B	Retired	
2145–2165	1980	FIL	D900	Retired	
3001–3005		FORD	B700	Retired	
3006–3022	1974–1975	RVI	Club Car	Retired	One unit was used to promote transit to children
5001–5014	1982	GMDD	TA60-102N	Retired	Articulated
5015–5026	1982	GMDD	TA60-102N	Retired	Articulated; ex-Toronto Transit Commission in 1986.
5027–5038	1982	GMDD	TA60-102N	Retired	Articulated; ex–OC Transpo in 1987; 5034 preserved by private owner in California, USA.
8401–8404	1984	OBI	01.504	Retired	Sent to St. Catharines Transit
8405–8416	1984	OBI	01.506	Retired	
8501	1985	OBI	01.508	Retired	
8601–8610	1986	OBI	01.508	Retired	8610 ex-OBI demonstrator in 1997
8801–8825	1988	OBI	01.508	Retired	Tinted windows from this order onwards; 8823 CNG powered; 8825 6V92TA engine and HT748 transmission.
8901–8925	1989	OBI	05.501	Retired	Air conditioning from this order onwards. First production Orion Vs; 8901 was sent to Mississauga Fire Department.
9001–9020	1990	OBI	05.501	Retired	
9101–9140	1990–1991	OBI	05.501	Retired	Cummins engine LTA10-240 with Voith D863.3 transmission; 9137–9139 Allison HT-746 transmission.
9201–9210	1992	OBI	05.501	Retired	CNG-powered; converted to diesel in 1997.
9301–9312	1992	OBI	05.501	Retired	
9350–9370	1993	New Flyer	D60HF	Retired	Articulated; built by MiWay's double-stream rear exit door expectations.
9701–9735	1997	OBI	05.501	Retired	The last unit retired on December 1, 2011, marking the end of MiWay's high-floor era.
9736–9747	1997	OBI	02.501	Retired	
9751–9785	1997	New Flyer	D60LF	Retired	Articulated; Low-floor buses from this order onwards.
9801–9842	1997	OBI	06.501	Retired	9810 Balios orange LED destination display (changed to Luminator MegaMax); 9811 Luminator Horizon destination display; 9812 TwinVision LED destination display (changed to Luminator MegaMax).
0101-0114	2001–2002	OBI	07.501	Retired	First production Orion VIIs.
0151-0160	2001	New Flyer	D60LF	Retired	Articulated; infrared transmitters for signal priority.
0301-0344	2003	New Flyer	D40LF	Retired	Infrared transmitters for signal priority – 0338 was the final unit in service in October 2023.
0501-0572	2005	New Flyer	D40LF	Retired	
0601-0653	2006	New Flyer	D40LFR	Retired	
0701-0712	2007	EDN	EZ Rider II MAX	Retired	American Seating Metropolitan. Sold to City View Bus Sales & Services in Mississauga. 0703 was the final unit in service.
0721-0735	2007	New Flyer	D40LFR	Retired	American Seating 6468 seats – 0723 was the final unit in service.
0851–0885	2007–2008	New Flyer	D60LFR	Retired	Articulated; 4ONE Aries seats.
0888-0899	2008	EDN	EZ Rider II MAX	Retired	Sold to City View Bus Sales & Services in Mississauga.
0801-0844, 0901-0925	2008	New Flyer	D40LFR	Retired	American Seating InSight seats;
0930-0941	2009	EDN	EZ Rider II MAX	Retired	4ONE Mariella seats; sold to City View Bus Sales & Services in Mississauga. 0930-0931, 0933-0941 are sold to Academy Bus Lines as 2901-2911 in April 2018.
1001–1020	2010	OBI	07.501 BRT	Active	MiLocal livery.
1031–1045	2010	OBI	07.501 HEV	Active	MiLocal livery; To be retired soon.
1051–1072	2010	New Flyer	D60LFR	Retired	Articulated; MiExpress livery; 1069–1071 are repainted into the MiLocal livery,
1101–1143	2011	New Flyer	XD40 Xcelsior	Active	MiLocal livery.
1201–1215	2012	OBI	07.501 BRT	Active	MiLocal livery.
1301–1314	2013	New Flyer	XD40 Xcelsior	Active	MiLocal livery; 1308 is retired.
1351–1360	2013	New Flyer	XD60 Xcelsior	Active	Articulated; MiLocal livery; 1351 is retired
1401–1407	2014	New Flyer	XD40 Xcelsior	Active	MiLocal livery.
1701–1727	2017	New Flyer	XD40 Xcelsior	Active	MiLocal livery; 1707 is retired.
1730–1766	2017	NovaBus	LFS	Active	MiLocal livery; 1738 is retired.
1770–1799	2017	NovaBus	LFS Artic	Active	Articulated; MiLocal livery; 1796 is retired.
1801–1812	2018	NovaBus	LFS	Active	MiLocal livery.
1901–1910	2019	NovaBus	LFS HEV	Active	MiLocal livery.
2051–2061	2020	New Flyer	XDE60 Xcelsior	Active	Articulated; MiLocal livery
2151-2155	2021	New Flyer	XDE60 Xcelsior	Active	Articulated; MiLocal livery.
2201-2274	2022	New Flyer	XDE40 Xcelsior	Active	MiLocal livery.
2275-2290	2022	New Flyer	XDE60 Xcelsior	Active	Articulated; MiLocal livery.
2301-2353	2023	New Flyer	XDE40 Xcelsior	Active	MiLocal livery.
2375-2396	2023	New Flyer	XDE60 Xcelsior	Active	Articulated; MiLocal livery.
2401-2482	2024	New Flyer	XDE40 Xcelsior	Active	MiLocal livery.

== Future services and connections ==
Map of rapid transit in Mississauga in 2030; showing the existing Mississauga Transitway, and the under-construction Hurontario LRT, which will extend into Brampton. Also shown is the Line 5 Eglinton LRT, which will run primarily underground across Toronto but will have one station in Mississauga connecting to the eastern end of the transitway at Renforth station

=== Bus services ===
MiWay has plans to introduce additional possible service or express on Mavis Road and McLaughlin Road, which are all facing sharp increases in ridership to connect with Sheridan College in Brampton. There have also been proposals to reinstate suspended express routes on Derry Road and Dixie Road, and to Pearson Airport. There are also plans to replace service on Churchill Meadows Boulevard and Lisgar Drive with a new route.

=== Light rail transit ===
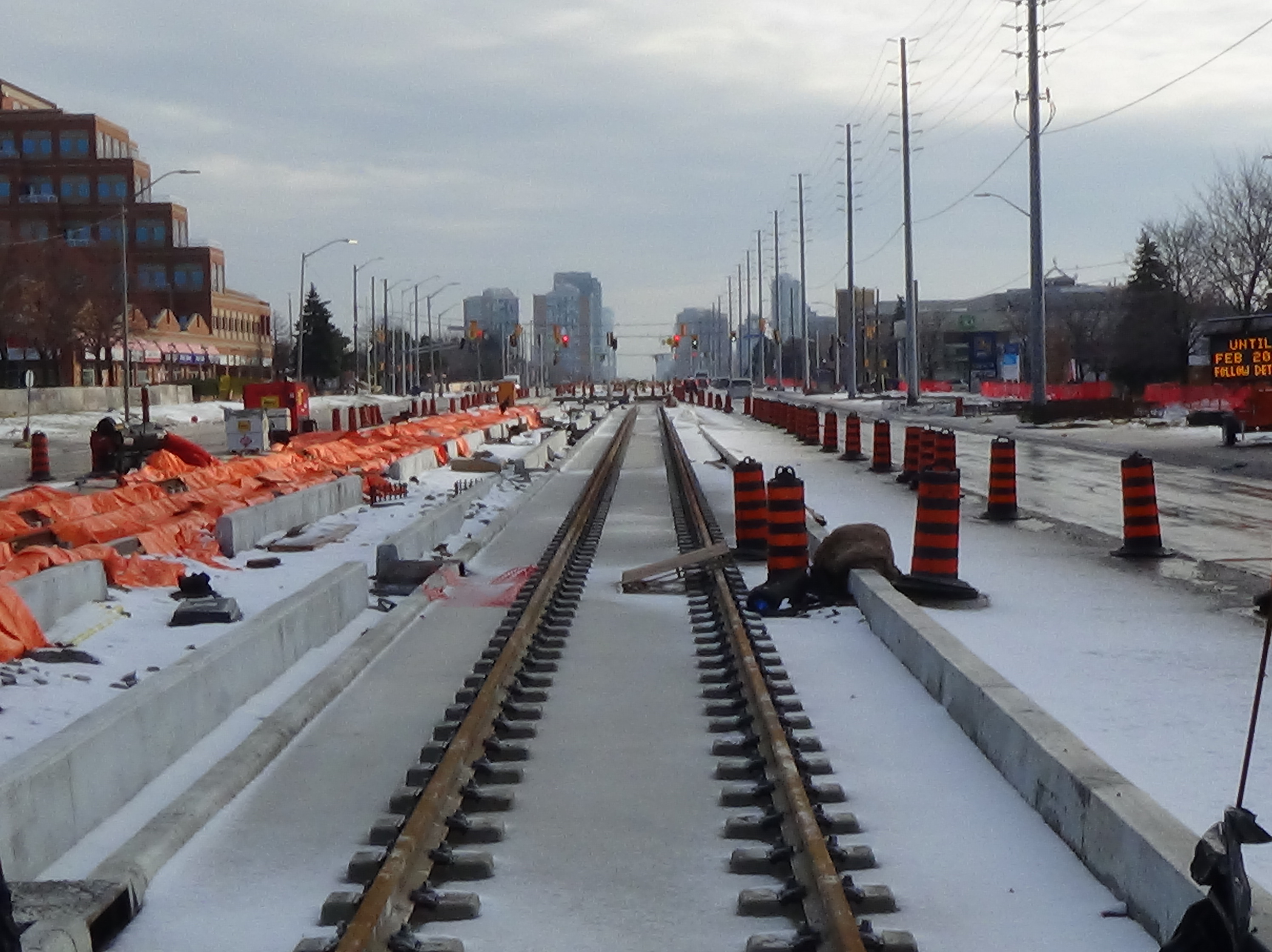
Construction of the Hurontario LRT in December 2022

Mississauga will be served by a 19 km light rail transit (LRT) route on Hurontario Street, running north from Port Credit GO Station and extending beyond the city limits into Brampton to terminate at Steeles Avenue. The line will link Port Credit, the City Centre, and the south end of Brampton in response to increasing congestion and anticipated high growth in the corridor. Construction began in 2020. It will replace express route 103 Hurontario Express once the new Hurontario LRT opens for passenger service.

The LRT will not be operated by MiWay, and instead will be operated by Mobilinx, the contractor selected by Metrolinx to design, build, finance, operate, and maintain (DBFOM) the system.

The LRT will connect to two GO Transit rail lines (Milton line at Cooksville GO Station and Lakeshore West line at Port Credit GO Station), and other rapid transit lines including Züm Steeles, Züm Main, and the Mississauga Transitway).

=== Toronto Subway ===
In addition to the Hurontario LRT, Toronto's Line 5 Eglinton is being extended to meet the Mississauga Transitway's Renforth station, bringing the Toronto Subway into Mississauga. It is expected to be completed by 2030 or 2031. A later phase is planned extend the line further to Pearson Airport and a future Airport transit hub.

=== Dundas Street BRT ===
An additional BRT Line is proposed to be built along Dundas Street. The Dundas Street bus rapid transit line is an on-street route that is tentatively proposed to run along the Dundas Street corridor between Kipling Subway Station in Toronto and Ridgeway Drive in west Mississauga and continue west to Waterdown via Oakville and Burlington.
