= Züm =

Bus rapid transit system in Ontario, Canada

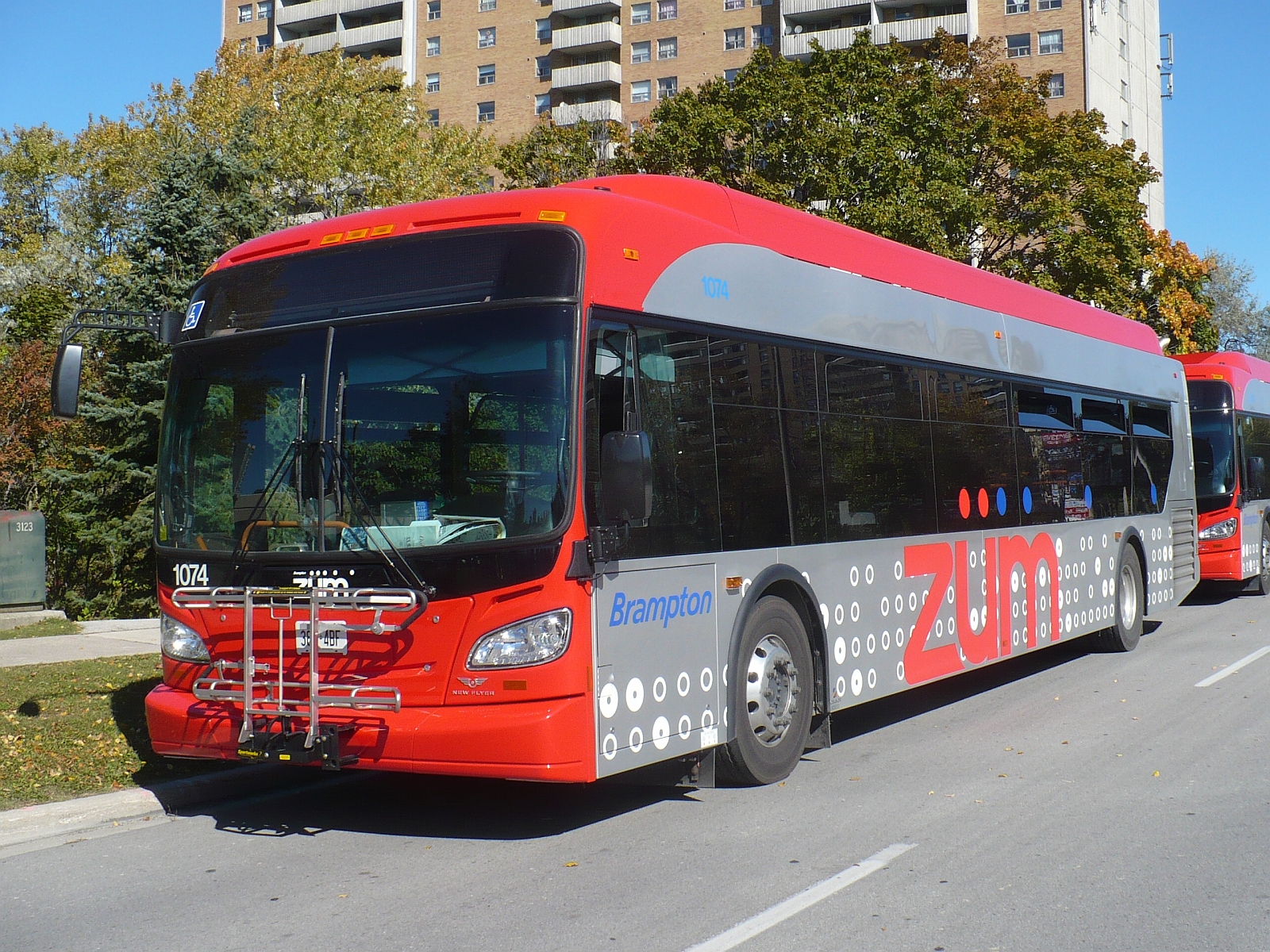
- Parent: Brampton Transit
- Founded: September 20, 2010; 16 years ago
- Service area: Brampton, Toronto, Vaughan, and Mississauga
- Service type: Bus rapid transit
- Alliance: Viva Rapid Transit
- Routes: 5
- Fleet: 43 40' XDE40; 58 60' XDE60
- Operator: Brampton Transit
- Website: About Züm

Züm (/zuːm/, pronounced Zoom) is a bus rapid transit system for the suburban city of Brampton, Ontario, Canada, northwest of Toronto, operated by Brampton Transit. Three routes extend into the Cities of Mississauga, Vaughan, and Toronto, with the first corridor having started service in fall 2010.

Phase 1 became fully operational by fall 2012. A key aspect of the Züm plan is increased service on supporting local corridors. Unlike other, similar, services and partly due to Brampton's diagonal geographic position relative to Toronto than other suburbs such as Mississauga or Vaughan, many Züm corridors will overlap significantly with other agencies' services, requiring more complex, co-operative planning between neighbouring cities. During the planning of this bus rapid transit system, Züm was called Acceleride.

Buses usually operate in mixed traffic, although Route 501 Queen uses the Highway 7 Rapidway, a busway built for York Region Transit's (YRT) similar Viva network, while travelling through most of Vaughan, and stops at all stations along YRT's Viva Orange route. Brampton Transit has a fare partnership agreement with York Region Transit that allows for boarding and debarking anywhere along the Viva Orange route, using Züm buses. This was particularly convenient during a labour dispute involving some contractors operating YRT resulting in the temporary suspension of Viva Orange.

== History ==
In the earlier stages of Brampton's rapid transit planning, the initiative was known as Acceleride (logo pictured).

Phase 1 planned for three express corridors to improve service on some of Brampton's busiest routes.

Originally, the 501 Queen route ran to York University in Toronto, with two express branches (501A and C) following Highway 407, but the express branches were cancelled and the base route cut back to Vaughan Metropolitan Centre (where the route had a connection with the namesake subway station since December 17, 2017 when a new subway extension opened) by June 2024.

In the future, the agency plans to look into constructing exclusive busways.

== Routes ==
Corridor	Opening date	Termini		Stops	Running time (mins)	Status	Connecting services
501 Queen	September 20, 2010	Downtown Brampton	Vaughan Metropolitan Centre	29	65-70	Full service	Brampton Transit, MiWay, YRT, TTC, GO, Viva Orange
502 Main	September 6, 2011	Sandalwood Parkway Loop	Mississauga City Centre Transit Terminal	18	55–60	Full service	Brampton Transit, MiWay, GO
511 Steeles	November 26, 2012	Lisgar GO Station (511) Sheridan College Bus Terminal (511C)	Humber College Bus Terminal	23	60–65	Full service	Brampton Transit, MiWay, TTC, YRT, GO, Milton Transit
505 Bovaird	September 2, 2014	Mount Pleasant GO	Viscount Terminal Link station	23/24	60-65	Full service	Brampton Transit, GO, MiWay, Terminal Link, TTC
561 Queen West	September 6, 2016	Mount Pleasant GO	Downtown Brampton	11	20–24	Monday To Friday only	Brampton Transit, GO
Under construction
504 Chinguacousy	TBA	Sandalwood Parkway	Bramalea GO Station	18	TBA	TBA	Brampton Transit, MiWay, GO

== Terminals ==
In preparation for the launch of Route 501 (Queen Street), Brampton Transit re-built its Bramalea City Centre Terminal, relocating it from its previous location beside Clark Boulevard, on the south side of the shopping centre, to the northeast corner, nearer to Queen Street. Minor renovations will also be performed at the downtown terminal.

In preparation for the launch of its 511 Steeles route, Brampton Transit also replaced the Shoppers' World terminal near Hurontario/Main Streets and Steeles Avenue with a new terminal, the Brampton Gateway Terminal, at the actual corner of Steeles and Hurontario/Main.

Züm uses the Downtown, Bramalea, and Brampton Gateway terminals, in addition to Mississauga's City Centre terminal, and the Toronto Transit Commission's Vaughan Metropolitan Centre subway station in Vaughan. Züm also connects to Toronto Pearson International Airport via an airport people mover (Terminal Link) station at Viscount Road in Mississauga.

=== Intermodal transfer points ===
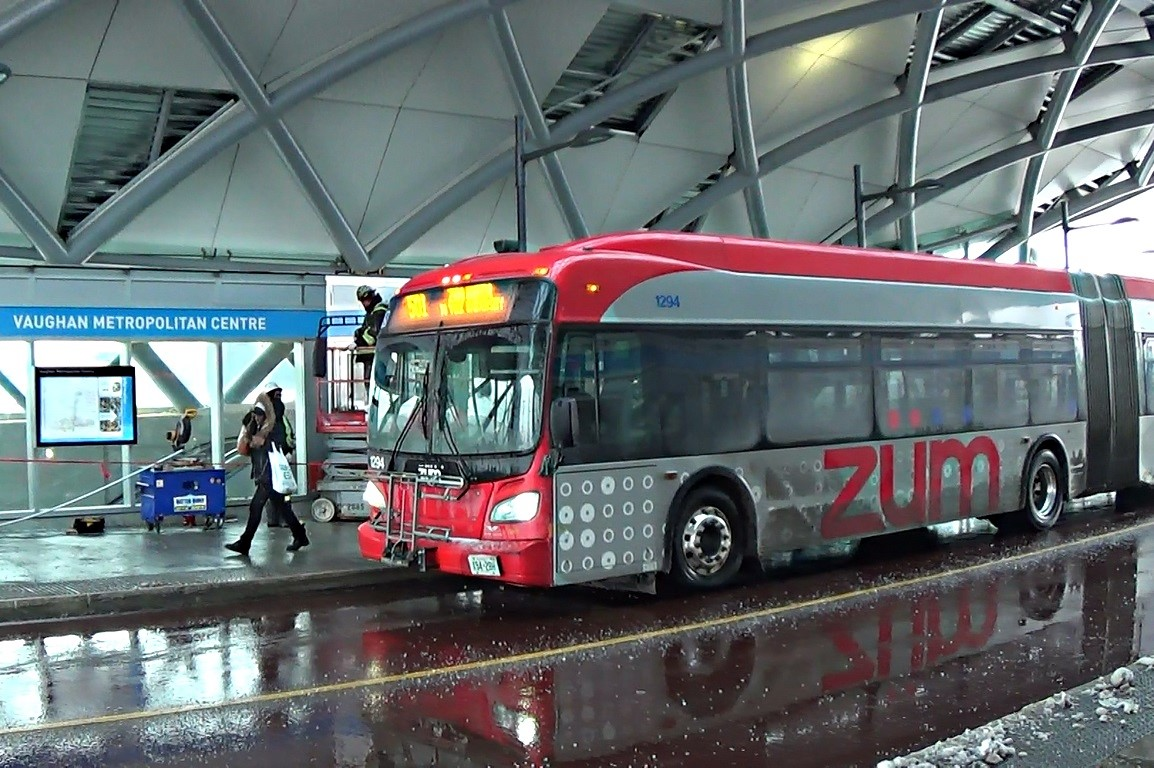
A 501 Züm Queen bus at the Vivastation at Vaughan Metropolitan Centre subway station

These stops allow interchanges with multiple regular Brampton Transit routes and/or other services (Miway, YRT, TTC, and GO Transit).

Stop	Corridor	Open
Bramalea City Centre Terminal	501 Queen	2010
Bramalea GO Station	511 Steeles	2012
Downtown Brampton Terminal	501 Queen; 502 Main	2010
Humber College LRT station and bus terminal (Toronto)	511 Steeles	2012
Lisgar GO Station (Mississauga)	511 Steeles	2015
Malton GO Station (Mississauga)	505 Bovaird (Airport Road segment)	2018
Mount Pleasant GO Station	505 Bovaird; 561 Queen West	2014
Brampton Gateway Terminal	502 Main; 511 Steeles	2011
Mississauga City Centre Transit Terminal	502 Main	2011
Trinity Common Terminal	505 Bovaird	2014
Vaughan Metropolitan Centre TTC subway station (Vaughan)	501 Queen	2017
Viscount Terminal Link station	505 Bovaird	2022

== Fares ==
Similar to York Region's Viva service, Züm buses shares the same fare structure as the conventional Brampton Transit system. Further partnership between the two agencies permits YRT customers to board Züm buses within York Region and pay standard YRT fares (despite the fact that Viva uses proof-of-payment and Züm does not).

The Presto card fare payment system has been active on Züm since 2011.

Brampton Transit is listed as one of the transit agencies in the GTHA to use Presto contactless payment such as debit, credit, and mobile wallets. This extends to the Züm network as well.

== See also ==
- Brampton Transit
- MoveOntario 2020
- Viva Rapid Transit (York Region Transit)
- MiExpress (MiWay)
