= Milton Transit =

Public transit system in Milton, Ontario

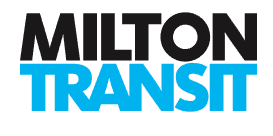
- Founded: February 2, 1972
- Headquarters: 43 Brown St., Milton, ON
- Service area: Milton, Ontario
- Service type: Bus service
- Routes: 11 Regular; 3 School Special
- Hubs: Milton GO Station
- Fleet: 40
- Annual ridership: 609 342 (2023)
- Operator: Pacific Western Transportation
- Website: Official website

Milton Transit is the public transit system in the town of Milton, Ontario, Canada. Milton is in Halton Regional Municipality, part of the Greater Toronto Area.

Milton Transit was inaugurated in 1972, and greatly expanded from 3 fixed routes to 5 fixed routes in September 2005. It replaced the former dial-a-bus and GO Transit local connector, which used school buses. The fixed route service was operated in partnership with Oakville Transit, which, never provided services connecting the municipalities.

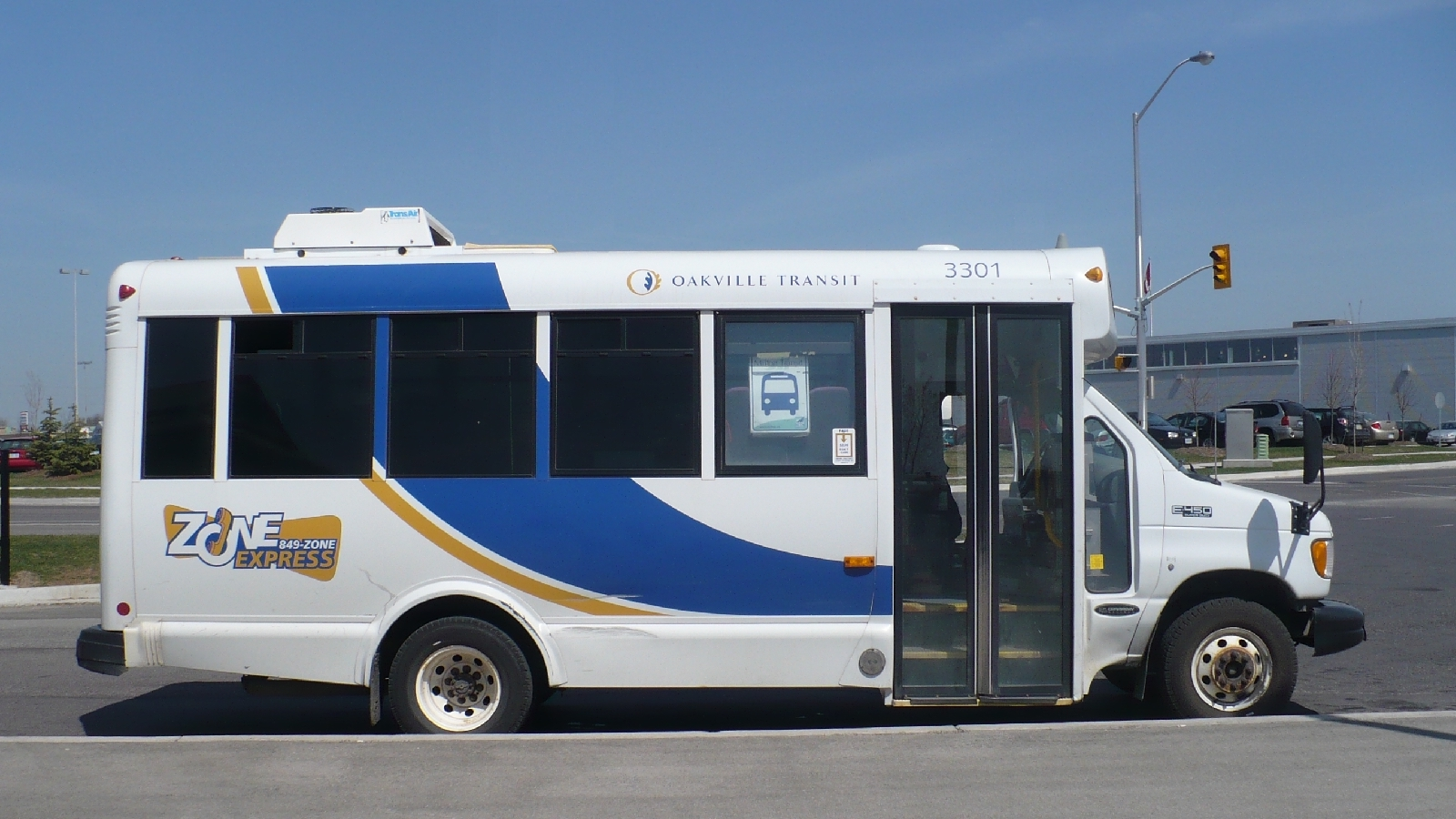
An Oakville Transit minibus at Milton GO station in 2008 when that system connected with Milton Transit

Oakville Transit also originally stored and maintained the buses at their garage. Buses were later stored and serviced at the Mississauga Truck and Bus Collision (MTB) facility, in Milton. That eliminated unnecessary travel to/from Oakville, as the buses previously had been deadheaded to and from Oakville each day. Prior to the agreement with MTB, Milton's buses were stored at GO Transit's Milton garage. The Town of Milton extended the contract for conventional transit services with Oakville Transit for a further three years, effective March 1, 2008.

In early 2010, the Town of Milton announced that it would be ending its agreements with Oakville Transit and Mississauga Truck and Bus, and that Pacific Western Transportation would be taking over all aspects of service beginning March 8, 2010.

On September 26, 2022, Milton Transit began service to Lisgar GO station in Mississauga along Steeles Avenue via Toronto Premium Outlets, giving it a connection with Miway and Brampton Transit – the system's first connections to other municipal transit agencies since the connection with Oakville Transit ended.

Since the inauguration of the service, there have been major adjustments in order to connect with the growing population of the town, and to the Milton line commuter train and bus routes operated by GO Transit.

In Summer 2025, Milton had successfully introduced an electric bus that was converted from diesel into its fleet lineup. The vehicle entered service in late July. The pilot project has been ongoing making it Canada's first converted bus.

As of September 2025, all local routes have begun operating on Sundays, with a 35-minute frequency on weekdays and a 40-minute frequency on weekends.

== Routes ==
=== Terminals & Connections ===
Milton Transit connects with the following transit agencies:

- Brampton Transit
- GO Transit
- MiWay (Mississauga Transit)

==== Milton Terminal ====
- Milton GO Station - All Standard Routes + School Routes 52, 53, and 54
  - Connects with GO Transit Milton line
  - Connects with GO Transit bus routes 21, 22, and 27A

Mississauga Terminal

- Lisgar GO Station - Route 21
  - Connects with GO Transit Milton line
  - Connects with GO Transit bus route 21
  - Connects with MiWay Route 38
  - Connects with Brampton Transit regular route 11 and Züm routes 511, 511A, and 511C

=== Regular ===
Route		Routing	Direction & Terminus				Via
1	High Point	Directional (North/South)	NB	Conestoga College Milton Campus	SB	Milton GO Station	Ontario Street - Industrial Drive - Parkhill Drive
2	Main	Directional (East/West)	WB	Milton District Hospital	EB	Milton Crossroads Centre (Walmart Milton)	Bronte Road - Main Street - Milton GO Station - Maple Avenue - Steeles Avenue
3	Trudeau	Directional (East/West)	WB	Mattamy National Cycling Centre	EB	Milton GO Station	Laurier Avenue - Trudeau Dr - Louis St. Laurent Avenue
4	Thompson / Clark	Loop (In/Out)	OUT	Fourth Line & Louis St. Laurent Ave	IN	Milton GO Station	Thompson Road - Clark Drive - Louis St. Laurent Avenue
5	Yates	Loop (In/Out)	OUT	Hepburn Road & Philbrook Drive	IN	Milton GO Station	Ontario Street - Laurier Avenue - Holly Avenue - Yates Drive
6	Scott	Loop (In/Out)	OUT	Scott Boulevard & Derry Road	IN	Milton GO Station	Main Street - Scott Boulevard - Savoline Boulevard - Sherwood Community Centre
7	Harrison	Loop (In/Out)	OUT	Dymott Avenue & Savoline Boulevard	IN	Milton GO Station	Thompson Road - Derry Road - Milton District Hospital - Scott Boulevard - Dymott Avenue
8	Willmott	Loop (In/Out)	OUT	Bronte Street & Louis St. Laurent Ave	IN	Milton GO Station	Milton GO Station - Ontario Street - Derry Road - Bronte Street - Milton Sports Centre - Santa Maria Boulevard
9A	Ontario South	Directional (North/South)	NB	Milton GO Station	SB	Elsie McGill S.S.	Ontario Street - Whitlock Avenue - Bronte Street - Etheridge Avenue
9B	Ontario South	Directional (North/South)	NB	Milton GO Station	SB	Regional Road 25 & Britannia Road	Ontario Street - Whitlock Avenue - Kennedy Circle W - Logan Drive - Britannia Road
21	Steeles	Directional (East/West)	WB	Milton GO Station	EB	Lisgar GO Station	Thompson Road - Main Street - James Snow Parkway South - Steeles Avenue - Toronto Premium Outlets - Winston Churchill Boulevard

=== School Extras ===
Route		Notable Stops	Availability
50	School Extra	Scott Boulevard - Savoline Boulevard - Pringle Avenue - Derry Road - Saint Francis Xavier Catholic S.S - Milton District HS	Before & after school hours
51	School Extra	Scott Boulevard - Savoline Boulevard - Derry Road - Saint Francis Xavier Catholic S.S - Milton District HS	Before & after school hours
52	School Extra	Saint Francis Xavier Catholic S.S - Louis St. Laurent Avenue - Thompson Road - Craig Kielburger SS - Milton GO Station	Before & after school hours
53	School Extra	Elsie MacGill S.S. - Downtown Milton - Derry Road - Saint Francis Xavier Catholic S.S - Milton GO Station	Before & after school hours
53A	School Extra	Milton District HS - Derry Road - Downtown Milton - Elsie MacGill S.S - Milton GO Station	Before & after school hours
54	School Extra	Saint Kateri Tekakwitha Catholic S.S - Louis St. Laurent Avenue - Thompson Road - Craig Kielburger SS - Milton GO Station	Before & after school hours

== On-Demand ==
Milton Transit operates on-demand services throughout the main urban core of the town. Service often overlaps with existing routes and is eligible for transfers at Milton GO Station, as well as other transfer points. There are 3 on-request areas around the urban centre:

- 401 Industrial Zone — The industrial zone entouring Highway 401
- Derry Green Zone — The commercial zone on Fifth Line, between the urban centre of Milton and Mississauga
- Boyne Zone — The newly developed residential areas in the south of the urban centre, bounded by Tremaine Rd, Britannia Rd, Louis St. Laurent Ave, and James Snow Pky

== Access+ ==
Milton Transit operates a free accessible door-to-door service titled "Milton Access+". The service only operates in urban areas of the town, and has options to connect to Peel TransHelp and Halton Hills ActiVan.

First Canada and A1 Taxi had the contract for accessible services which operate on demand until sometime in 2015. Pacific Western Transportation which also holds the contract for conventional service took over operations of Access+ using a Milton branded bus.

== Terminals ==
- Milton GO Station
- Regional Rd. 25/ Highway 401 Park-and-Ride

== See also ==
- Public transport in Canada
