= Winston Churchill station =

Bus station in Mississauga, Ontario, Canada

Winston Churchill
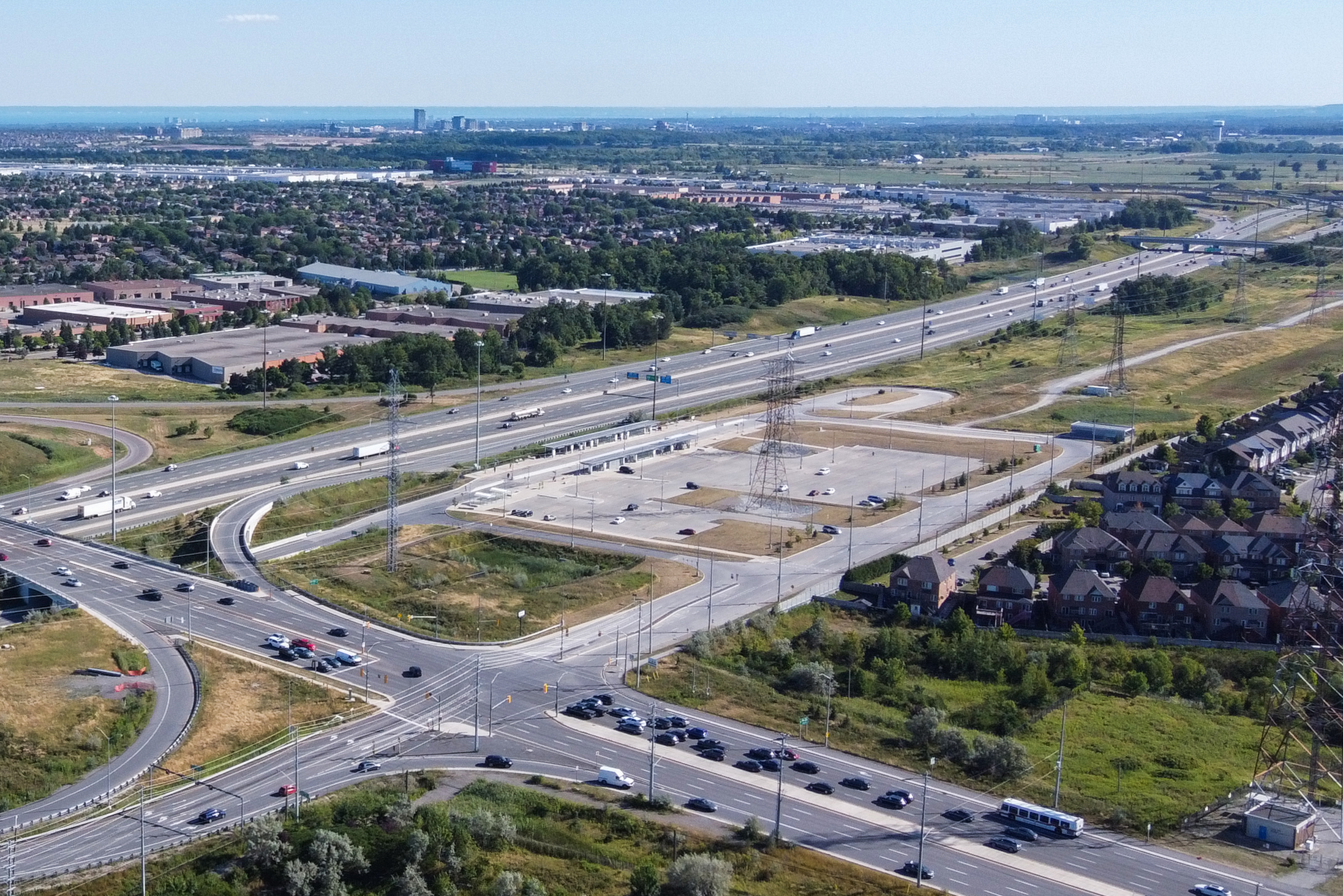
- Aerial view of Winston Churchill station

General information
- Location: 4310 Winston Churchill Boulevard; Mississauga, Ontario; Canada
- Coordinates: 43°32′36″N 79°42′44″W
- Owner: Metrolinx
- Line: Mississauga Transitway
- Platforms: Side platforms
- Bus routes: GO Transit buses: 25 Waterloo/Mississauga; 25L Waterloo/Mississauga; 29 Guelph/Mississauga; MiWay buses: 36 Ridgeway; 45 Winston Churchill; 45A Winston Churchill; 109 Meadowvale Express; 135 Eglinton Express
- Bus operators: GO Transit; MiWay

Construction
- Parking: 300 park and ride spaces
- Cycle facilities: Shelters
- Accessible: yes

Other information
- Station code: GO Transit: 02635
- Fare zone: 21

History
- Opened: December 31, 2016

Services
Preceding station	Metrolinx	Following station
Terminus	Mississauga Transitway	Erin Mills toward Renforth
Location

Winston Churchill is a bus station in the community of Erin Mills in western Mississauga, Ontario, Canada. It is located northwest of the Winston Churchill Boulevard / Highway 403 interchange and is the western terminus of the Mississauga Transitway.

Metrolinx began construction of the Mississauga Transitway West between Winston Churchill Boulevard and Erin Mills Parkway in October 2013 and was completed on December 31, 2016.

== Bus service ==
=== GO Transit ===
- 25, 25L Waterloo/Mississauga
- 29 Guelph/Mississauga

=== MiWay ===
- 36 Ridgeway
- 45 Winston Churchill
- 45A Winston Churchill
- 109 Meadowvale Express
- 135 Eglinton Express
