= Renforth station =

Bus station in Mississauga, Ontario

Renforth
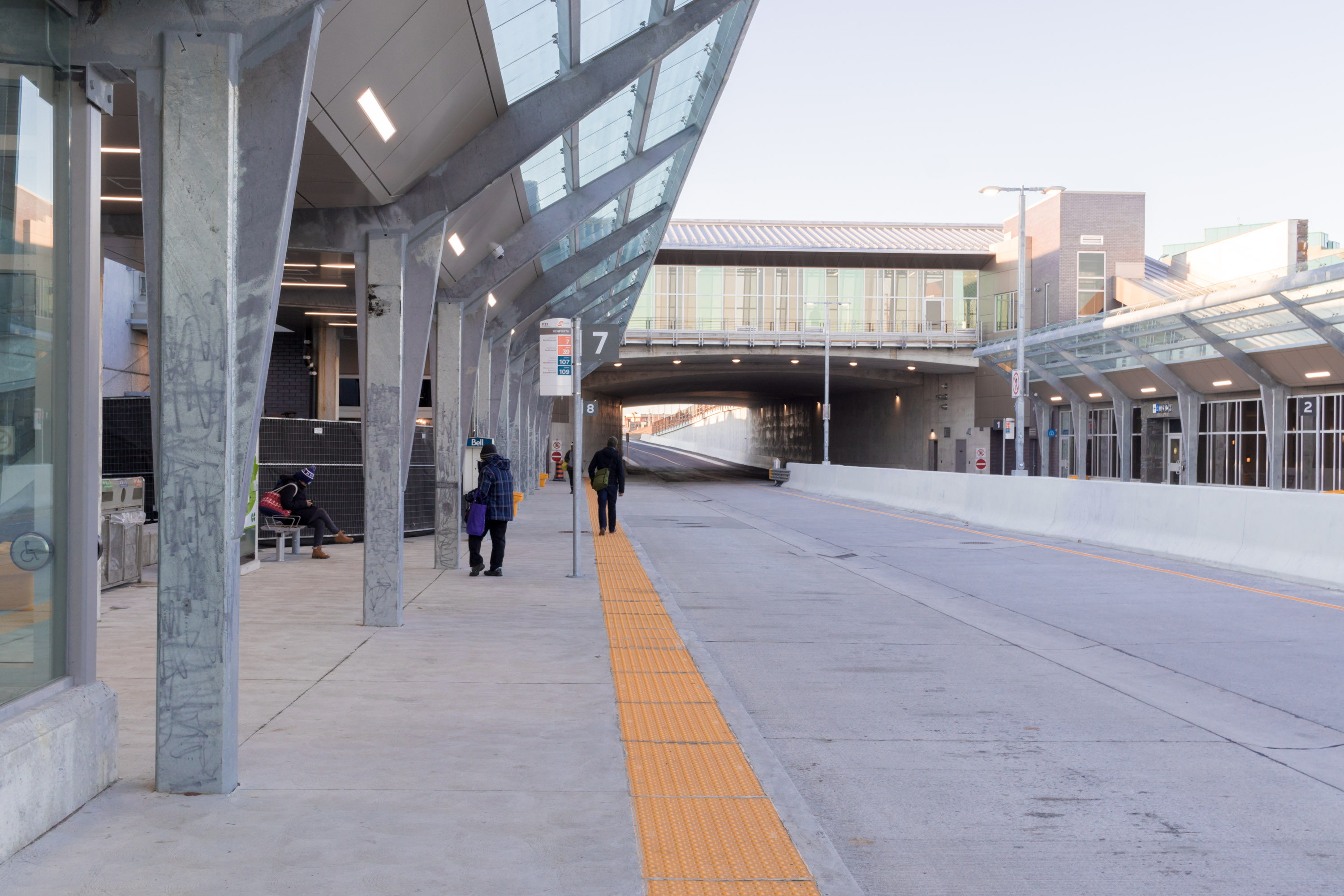
- Renforth station platform looking west

General information
- Location: 5001 Commerce Boulevard; Mississauga, Ontario; Canada
- Coordinates: 43°39′48″N 79°35′27″W
- Owner: Metrolinx
- Line: Mississauga Transitway
- Bus routes: GO buses: 19 Mississauga / North York; 25K Waterloo / Mississauga; 29 Guelph/Mississauga; 40 Hamilton / Richmond Hill; 94 Pickering / Square One; MiWay buses: 7 Airport; 24 Northwest; 35 Eglinton; 39 Britannia; 43 Matheson; 57 Courtneypark; 57A Courtneypark; 74 Explorer; 107 Malton Express; 109 Meadowvale Express; 135 Eglinton Express; TTC buses: 32 Eglinton West; 112 West Mall; 334 Eglinton
- Bus operators: GO Transit; MiWay; Toronto Transit Commission

Construction
- Accessible: Yes

Other information
- Station code: GO Transit: 02661
- Fare zone: 25

History
- Opened: November 22, 2017 (buses); 2030 (4 years' time) (Line 5)

Services
Preceding station	Metrolinx	Following station
Orbitor toward Winston Churchill	Mississauga Transitway	Terminus

Future services
Preceding station	Toronto Transit Commission	Following station
Terminus	Line 5 west extension (opens 2031)	Martin Grove towards Kennedy
Location

Renforth is a bus rapid transit (BRT) station on the border of the cities of Mississauga and Toronto, in Ontario, Canada. Located at Eglinton Avenue and Renforth Drive (although the station entrance is on Commerce Boulevard), it is the eastern terminus of the Mississauga Transitway and is close to the interchange between Highways 401 and 427.

The station is served by MiWay BRT express bus routes and GO Transit Highway 401 / Highway 407 corridor buses using the Mississauga Transitway, as well as local MiWay and Toronto Transit Commission (TTC) bus routes, and an express connection to Kipling subway station via Highway 427.

A westward extension of Line 5 Eglinton (the first phase of which opened in February 2026) to reach Renforth is under construction, with an estimated completion in 2030.

== Planning and construction ==
The station site, referred to during planning as Renforth Gateway, was identified by Metrolinx in 2012 as a transportation mobility hub, which would integrate bus rapid transit and local bus service. Construction of the station began in 2014. The old TTC bus loop located at the northwest corner of Renforth and Eglinton was decommissioned and incorporated into the site.

== Description ==
The entrance to Renforth station is located on Commerce Boulevard. The bus platforms are below grade and are accessed by stairs and elevators from the entrance level. It contains washrooms, an enclosed and heated waiting area, and bicycle parking.

== Bus routes ==
=== GO Transit ===
- 19 Mississauga / North York
- 25K Waterloo / Mississauga
- 29 Mississauga/Guelph
- 40 Hamilton / Richmond Hill Pearson Express
- 94 Pickering / Square One

=== MiWay ===
- 7 Airport
- 24 Northwest
- 35 Eglinton (boards on curbside stops outside the station)
- 39 Britannia
- 43 Matheson
- 57/57A Courtneypark
- 74 Explorer
- 107 Malton Express
- 109 Meadowvale Express
- 135 Eglinton Express

=== TTC ===
- 32 Eglinton West
- 112 West Mall
- 334 Eglinton Blue Night

== Future Line 5 Eglinton connection ==
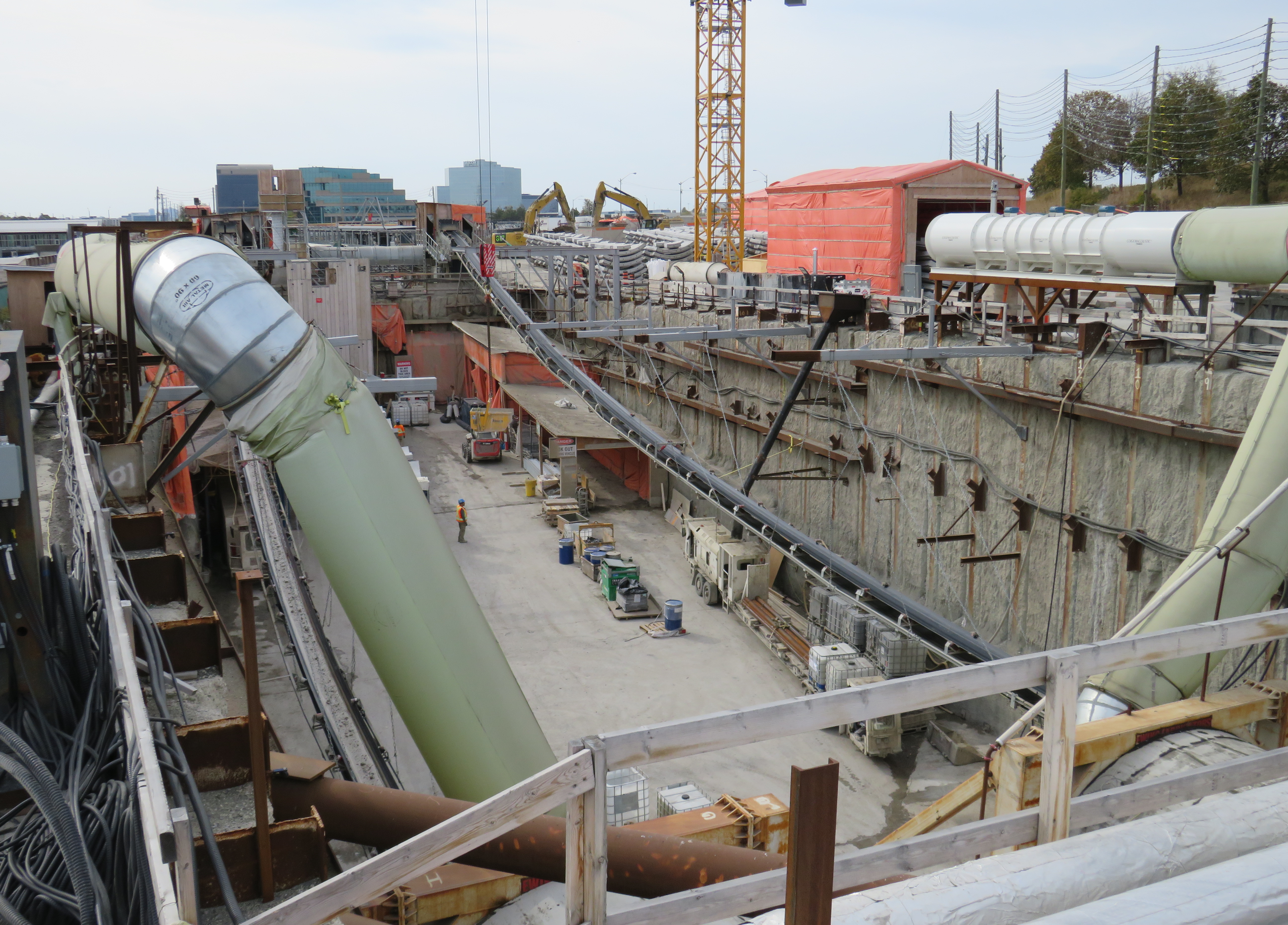
Renforth station box under construction in October 2023

Renforth station will be the western terminus of the second phase of Line 5 Eglinton, part of the Toronto subway. In April 2022, construction of the Eglinton Crosstown west extension began along Eglinton Avenue to the east in Toronto from Mount Dennis station. The station will be located below grade in an open trench just north of the transitway station and will be the first Toronto subway station to be located in the City of Mississauga.

In December 2021, parts of the tunnel boring machines (TBMs) that would bore the twin tunnels 6.3 kilometres (3.9 mi) eastwards along Eglinton from a launch shaft at the future station site arrived and were assembled prior to excavation. The first TBM, dubbed Renny (the name being a reference to Renforth Drive), began tunnelling in April 2022 but the second, named Rexy, started later, by early August, as the launch area was only wide enough to launch one TBM at a time. Tunnelling was completed two years later, with Renny breaking through the extraction shaft near Scarlett Road in May 2024 and Rexy breaking through three weeks later.

A proposed third phase of the line would extend and turn north, where it would terminate at the proposed Pearson Regional Transit Centre located north of Toronto Pearson International Airport Terminals 1 and 3. As an interim project, land was preserved for future dedicated bus lanes to the airport.
