= Galt Subdivision =

Overview
- Status: Operational
- Owner: Canadian Pacific Kansas City
- Locale: Southern Ontario, Canada
- Termini: West Toronto Diamond; London
- Stations: Kipling; Dixie; Cooksville; Erindale; Streetsville; Meadowvale; Lisgar; Milton

Service
- Type: Heavy rail
- System: Canadian Pacific Kansas City
- Services: Milton

Technical
- Track gauge: 1,435 mm (4 ft 8 1/2 in) standard gauge

Canadian Pacific Kansas City's Galt Subdivision is CPKC's 114.6-mile long (184.4 km) section of its Montréal-Detroit freight corridor. It is located in Southern Ontario, Canada. Getting its name from the historic City of Galt (now the City of Cambridge) that it passes through, the track runs from the bustling hub of Toronto, Ontario, to London, Ontario. GO Transit's Milton GO train service operates on this line from Toronto Union Station to Milton GO station. The rest of the line plays host to mixed freight and intermodal traffic, from Toronto to termini like Detroit, and Chicago. This Central Ontario line also had CP passenger rail service until it was eliminated in 1971. Passenger rail service would be partly restored halfway through the line through the introduction of GO Transit operations in 1981 westward only as far as the Town of Milton.

== GO Transit Operations ==
On October 27, 1981, GO Transit began running loaded passenger trains from Union Station to Milton GO station, then deadheading to Guelph Junction. This process was reversed in the mornings. These trains are powered by the MPI MP40PH-3C locomotives, and haul 12 Bombardier BiLevel passenger coaches. The stations served along the line are (from Milton east to Union):

- Milton
- Lisgar
- Meadowvale
- Streetsville
- Erindale
- Cooksville
- Dixie
- Kipling
- Union

More recently, GO Transit has stopped deadheading their trains to Guelph Junction for overnight and weekend storage - they have built a yard just west of 5th line in Milton, with a connecting siding directly from the GO station. There are 10 trains operating on a weekday basis, to Toronto in the mornings, and to Milton in the evenings. GO does not operate any "express" service on their Milton Line.

Since the loss of passenger rail service to the City of Galt in 1971, taxpayers, community leaders and politicians from the City of Cambridge have been lobbying the provincial government for decades for the restoration of passenger rail service. This issue is still ongoing as Cambridge is the largest city in Ontario without passenger rail service.

== Canadian Pacific Kansas City freight operations ==
CPKC runs several freight trains in both ways along almost the full length of the subdivision. They do not run the full length of the line, as the portion that ran south-east to Union Station was sold to Metrolinx/GO transit. From Lambton Yard west, freight traffic begins on the Galt Subdivision. More recently around October 2010, unit trains have commenced operation on the Galt sub. These ethanol trains come in the way of train ID numbers 650 as eastbound loaded movements, with 651 being the westbound empty return movements. There are many other trains as well, such as manifests, intermodals, double-stacks, autorackers, and even the almost-weekly Expressway train. Regulated operating speeds on the Galt Subdivision range from 50–60 mph (80–95 km/h).

== See also ==
- Rail transport in Ontario
