= Credit Valley Hospital =

- Trillium Health Partners

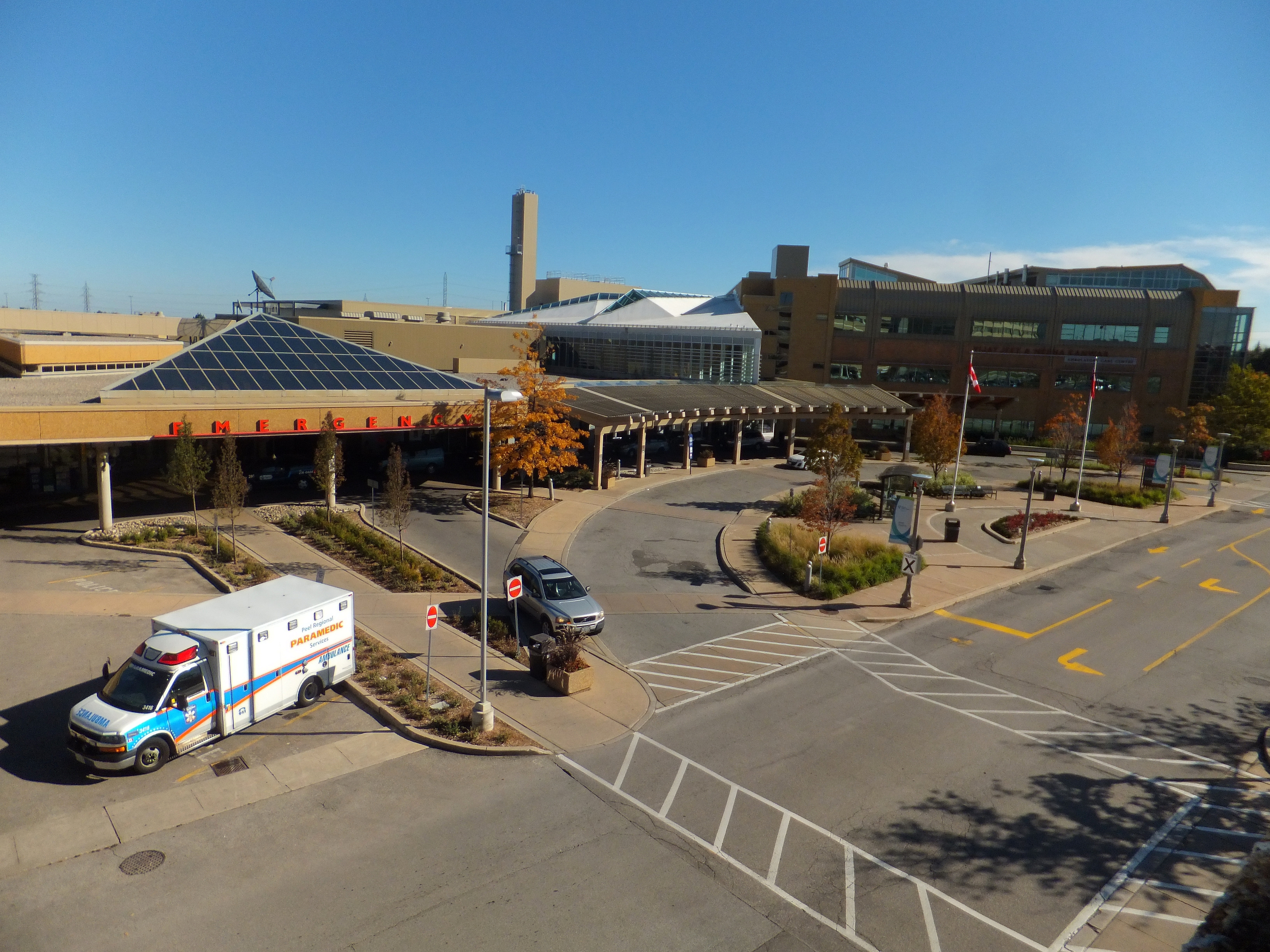
- Main entrance and emergency department

Geography
- Location: 2200 Eglinton Avenue West, Mississauga, Ontario, Canada
- Coordinates: 43.559°N 79.703°W

Organization
- Type: General
- Affiliated university: University of Toronto

Services
- Emergency department: Yes
- Beds: 382

Helipads
- Helipad: TC LID: CPK6

History
- Founded: 1985

Links
- Website: www.trilliumhealthpartners.ca

Credit Valley Hospital is a regional hospital located in Mississauga, Ontario. Officially opened on November 5, 1985, it is now part of the Trillium Health Partners hospital group and primarily serves the communities of north Mississauga: Streetsville, Meadowvale, Erin Mills and the surrounding area. In 2012, it was ranked as the best hospital in the Greater Toronto Area in a study conducted by the Canadian Institute for Health Information.

== Services ==
The hospital provides services and covers areas of medicine including:

- Cardiac services
- Continuing care/rehabilitation
- Emergency
- General medicine
- Genetics
- Mental health
- Diagnostic Imaging
- Obstetrics and gynecology
- Oncology
- Paediatrics
- Renal dialysis
- Surgery

The hospital is equipped with a ground level helipad north of the hospital at Eglinton Avenue West and Credit Valley Road.

== Expansion ==
The hospital has expanded to include a new cancer treatment centre (The Carlo Fidani Peel Regional Cancer Centre) and also a regional maternal child care program. The cancer centre serves a catchment area of 1.6 million people. In addition to chemotherapy, there are six linear accelerators (radiation treatment machines).

== Teaching partnership ==
Credit Valley Hospital acts as a teaching hospital for students in the Mississauga Academy of Medicine at the University of Toronto Faculty of Medicine. It is affiliated with the university through Trillium Health Partners.

== Public transit access ==
Credit Valley Hospital

General information
- Location: 2200 Eglinton Avenue West, Mississauga, Ontario
- Coordinates: 43°33′31″N 79°42′13.7″W
- Owner: City of Mississauga
- Bus stands: 2
- Bus operators: MiWay
- Connections: GO Transit

Construction
- Parking: no
Location

Credit Valley Hospital is a MiWay bus terminal located at the north side of the hospital.

The bus terminal contains only bus shelters.

=== MiWay routes ===
The terminal itself is served exclusively by MiWay. However, GO Transit indirectly serves the hospital by stopping at the entrances from Eglinton Avenue and Erin Mills Parkway. All MiWay routes are wheelchair-accessible.

| Route | | Destination |
|---|---|---|
| 9 | Rathburn | Churchill Meadows Community Centre via Erin Mills Town Centre to City Centre via Erindale GO Station |
| 35 | Eglinton | Churchill Meadows Community Centre to Kipling Bus Terminal (at Eglinton Ave) |
| 46 | Tenth Line | Meadowvale Town Centre via Erin Mills Town Centre to Erin Mills Station (at Erin Mills Pkwy) |
| 48 | Erin Mills | Meadowvale Town Centre via Erin Mills Town Centre to University of Toronto Mississauga via Erin Mills Station and South Common Centre |
| 135 | Eglinton Express | Winston Churchill Station to Kipling Bus Terminal (at Eglinton Ave) |

=== GO Transit ===
GO Transit buses stop at the entrances of the hospital.

| Route | | Destination |
|---|---|---|
| 21 | Milton Train-Bus | Milton GO Station and Union Station Bus Terminal via Dixie GO Station, Cooksville GO Station, Square One Bus Terminal, Erindale GO Station, Streetsville GO Station and Meadowvale GO Station (at Eglinton Avenue) |
| 21A | Milton Train-Bus | Milton GO Station and Union Station Bus Terminal via Cooksville GO Station, Square One Bus Terminal, Erindale GO Station, Streetsville GO Station and Meadowvale GO Station (at Eglinton Avenue) |
| 21D | Milton Train-Bus | Lisgar GO Station and Union Station Bus Terminal via Streetsville & Erindale GO Stations (at Eglinton Avenue) |
| 21E | Milton Train-Bus | Lisgar GO Station and Union Station Bus Terminal via Streetsville GO Station (at Erin Mills Parkway) |
| 21N | Milton Train-Bus | Milton GO Station and Union Station Bus Terminal via Erindale, Streetsville and Meadowvale GO Stations (at Eglinton Avenue) |
| 21P | Milton Train-Bus | Meadowvale GO Station and Union Station Bus Terminal via Cooksville GO Station, Square One Bus Terminal, Erindale GO Station and Streetsville GO Station (at Eglinton Avenue) |
| 21R | Milton Train-Bus | Meadowvale GO Station and Union Station Bus Terminal via Streetsville and Erindale GO Stations (at Eglinton Avenue) |
| 45 | Streetsville - Highway 407 | Streetsville GO Station and Highway 407 Bus Terminal (at Erin Mills Parkway) |
