= Streetsville GO Station =

Railway station in Mississauga, Ontario, Canada

Streetsville
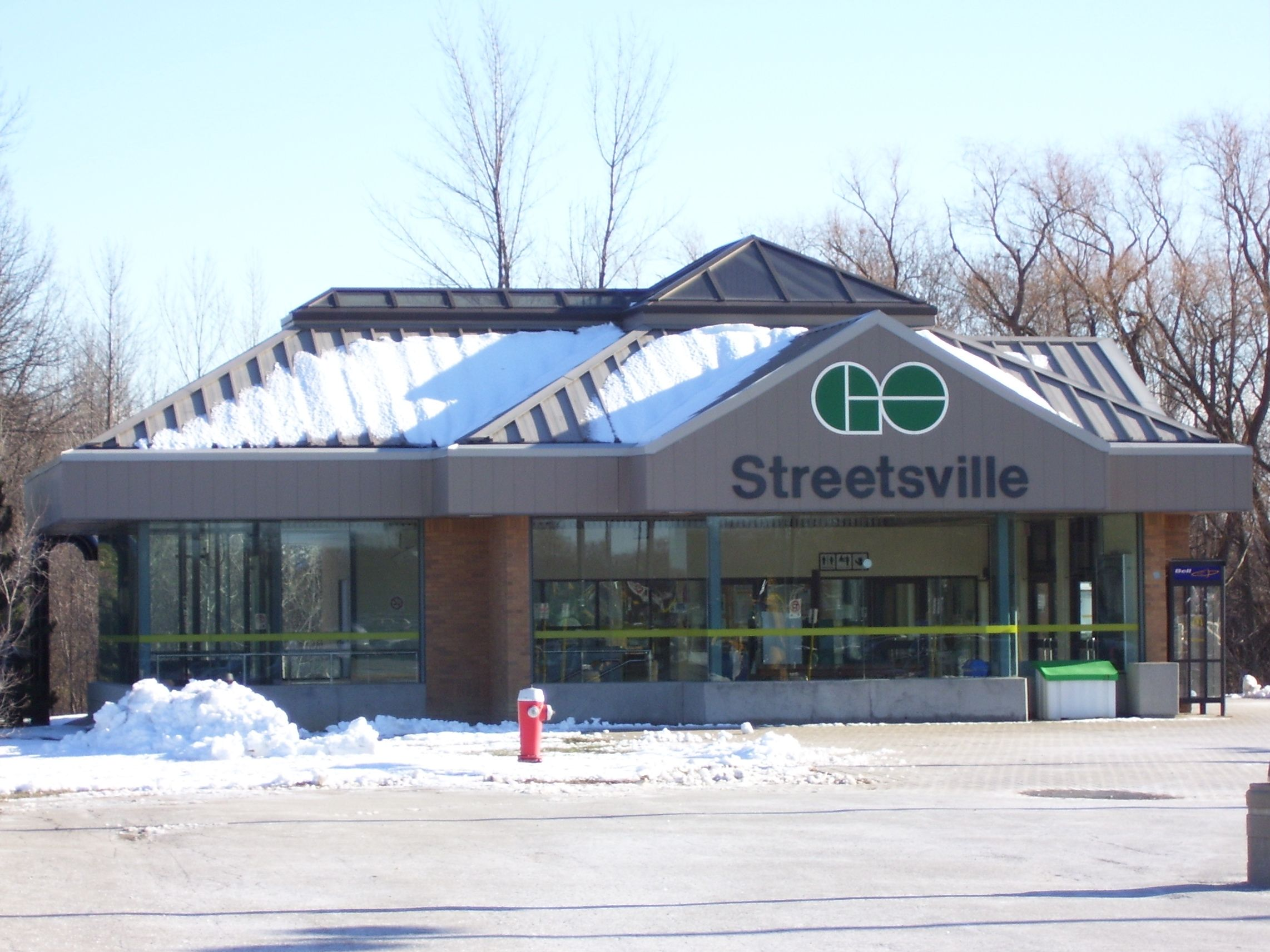
- Station building in 2007

General information
- Location: 45 Thomas Street; Mississauga, Ontario; Canada
- Coordinates: 43°34′32″N 79°42′32″W
- Owner: Metrolinx
- Platforms: 1 island platform (rail); 5 (bus)
- Tracks: 2
- Bus routes: 21
- Connections: MiWay

Construction
- Structure type: Brick station building with a tunnel and elevators to platforms
- Parking: 1,651 spaces
- Cycle facilities: Yes
- Accessible: Yes

Other information
- Station code: GO Transit: SR
- Fare zone: 21

History
- Opened: 27 October 1981

Services
Preceding station	GO Transit	Following station
Meadowvale towards Milton	Milton	Erindale towards Union
Former services at Streetsville (lower)
Preceding station	Canadian Pacific Railway	Following station
Streetsville Junction toward Detroit	Detroit – Montreal	Erindale toward Montreal Windsor
Streetsville Junction toward Owen Sound	Owen Sound – Toronto	Erindale toward Toronto
Location

Streetsville GO Station is a GO Transit railway station on the Milton line in the Greater Toronto Area, Ontario, Canada. It is located in the community of Streetsville in Mississauga.

Like most GO stations, Streetsville offers parking for commuters, a bus loop, a station building housing ticket sales and a waiting room. There is limited external exposed shelter for bus passengers. A new lot with 135 additional spaces was constructed in 2015.

Although ridership on the Milton line has grown beyond GO's expectations, it is not possible to run more trains because the tracks are already busy with Canadian Pacific Kansas City freight traffic. In order to increase capacity, GO plans to extend the platforms to accommodate trains with twelve carriages rather than the current ten. As a temporary solution, extensive train-bus services help alleviate congestion.

Streetsville is one of several stations on the Milton Line, along with Dixie and Milton to offer facilities for mobility challenged passengers.

== Connecting transit ==
MiWay peak period service only

- 49A McDowell

== History ==
=== Streetsville Junction station ===
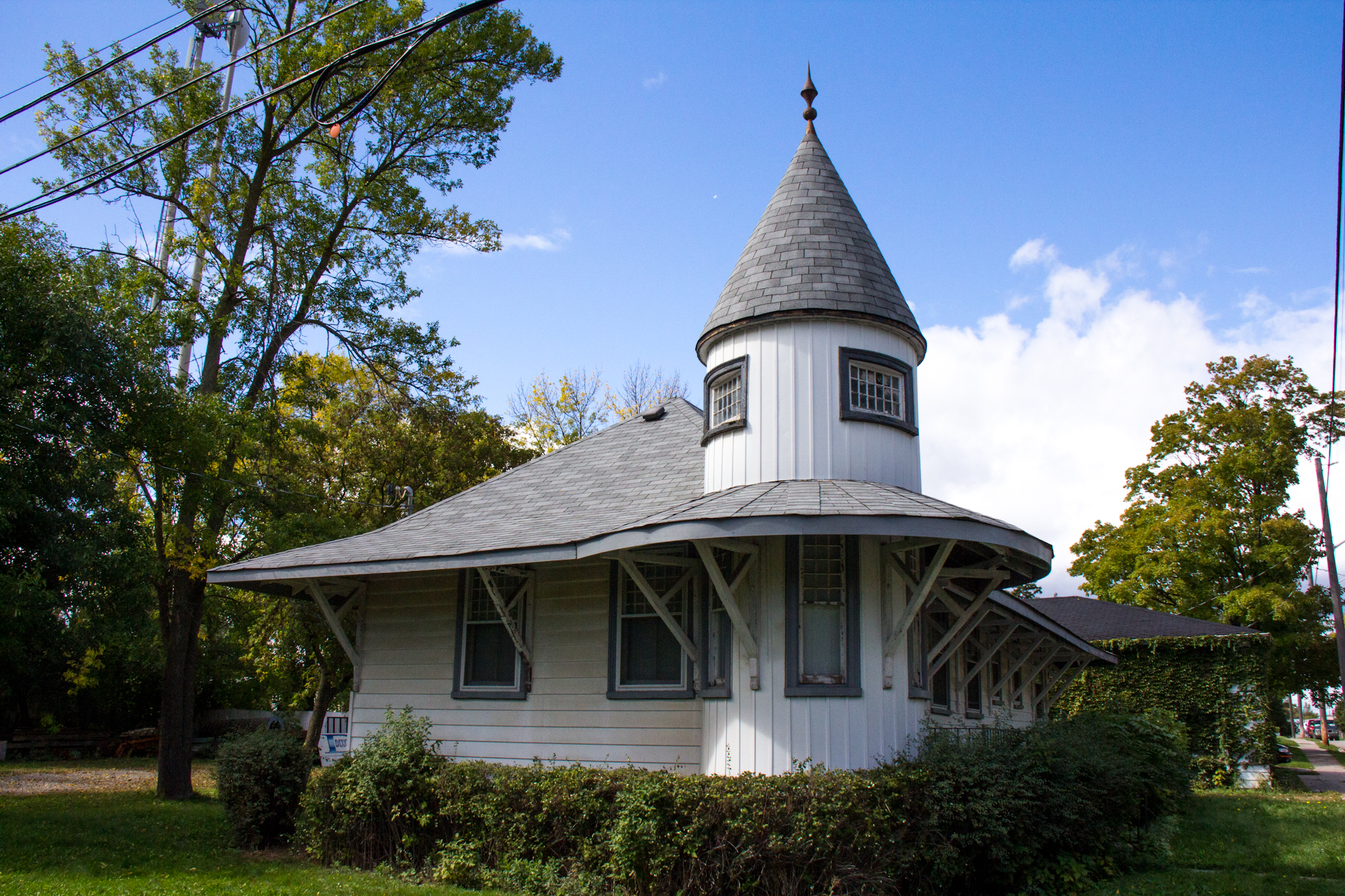
1879 station at new location

The Credit Valley Railway built the station in 1879, at the junction of the London and Orangeville branches (43°35′21″N 79°43′30″W) of the railway, just north of Britannia Road about two kilometres from the current GO Transit facility. This station was located so far from the small village of Streetsville that passengers complained and the new "lower" station was built. The original building was purchased by Ephraim Evans in 1914 and moved to its current location (43°35′03″N 79°43′09″W) at 78 William Street. It is designated under the terms of the Ontario Heritage Act. Later being renamed to "Streetsville station", passenger train service was discontinued in 1961 and the building was used as a freight office until its demolition in 1982.

=== Streetsville Lower station ===
This station was located at the end of Old Station Road in Streetsville, near the current GO Station site. When the "junction" station closed in 1961, the Canadian Pacific Railway replaced the small frame building with a more substantial brick building. Passenger train service at the lower station was discontinued sometime between 1933 and 1937. The GO Transit station opened on the approximate site of the lower station in 1981.
