= Hurontario LRT =

Light rail line under construction in Mississauga and Brampton, Ontario, Canada

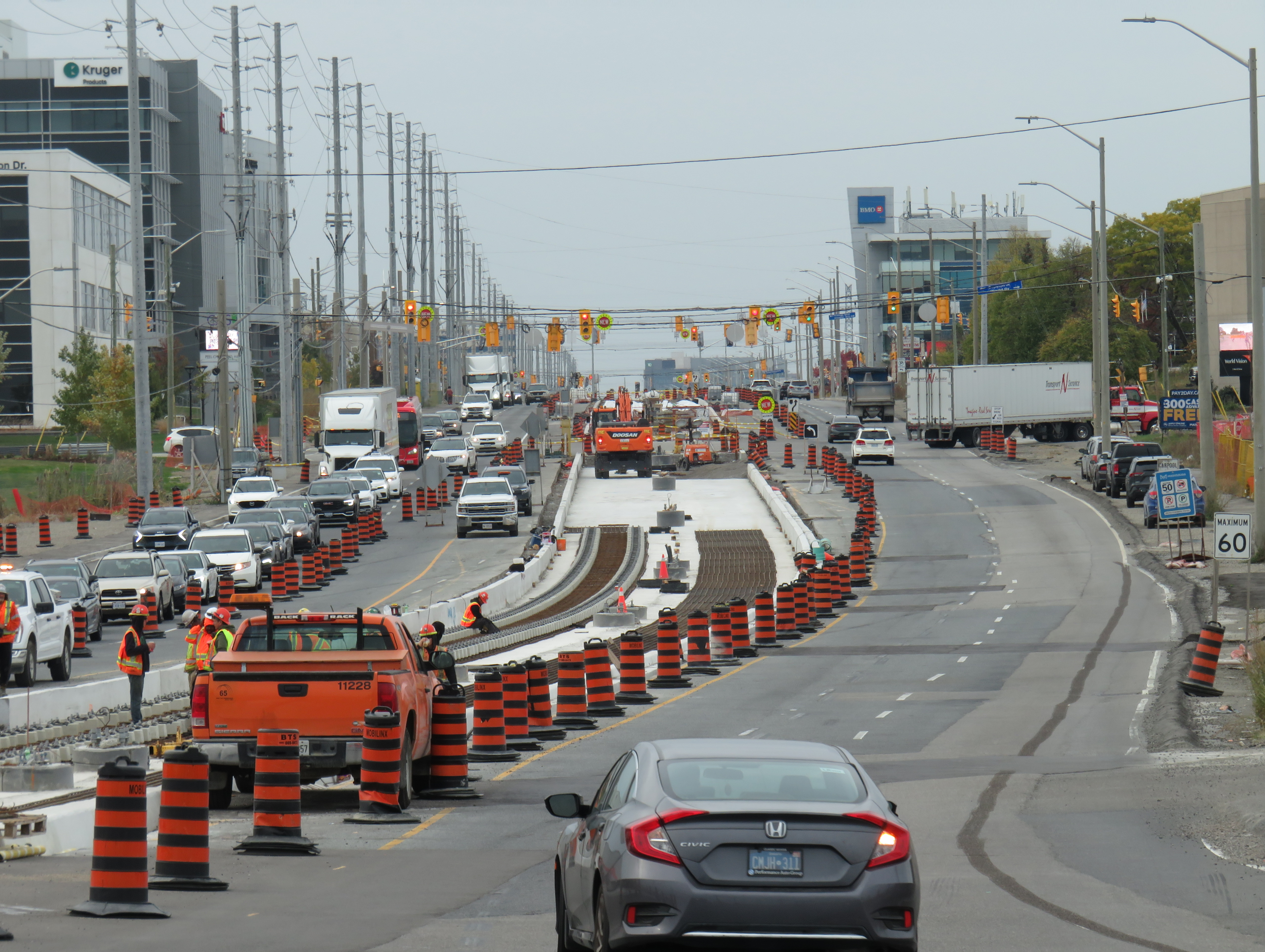
- Hurontario LRT under construction north of Highway 401 in October 2023

Overview
- Status: Under construction
- Owner: Metrolinx
- Locale: Peel Region
- Termini: Brampton Gateway Terminal; Port Credit GO Station
- Stations: 19
- Website: Official website

Service
- Type: Light rail
- Operator: Transdev (within Mobilinx consortium)
- Depot: OMSF near Highway 407
- Rolling stock: Citadis Spirit

History
- Planned opening: TBD

Technical
- Line length: 18 kilometres (11 mi)
- Track gauge: 1,435 mm (4 ft 8 1/2 in) standard gauge
- Electrification: 750 V DC overhead catenary
- Operating speed: 80 km/h (50 mph)

The Hurontario LRT, officially the Hazel McCallion Line and formerly known as the Hurontario–Main LRT, is a light rail line under construction in the cities of Mississauga and Brampton, Ontario, Canada. The line will run along Hurontario Street from Mississauga's Port Credit neighbourhood near Lake Ontario north to Steeles Avenue in Brampton. The line will be built and operated as a public–private partnership by Mobilinx, a consortium of private European and Japanese companies, with provincial transit agency Metrolinx retaining ownership of the line. It will be the only street railway operating in the Greater Toronto Area outside Toronto proper.

Upon opening, the Hazel McCallion Line name will be used. The name honours Hazel McCallion, the longtime former mayor of the City of Mississauga. In 2022, the provincial government announced the line's renaming on the occasion of the former mayor's 101st birthday. As of July 2025, no route number or map colour for the line has been officially announced, though constructed signage and Metrolinx's promotional materials suggest the LRT will be assigned to Line 10 and represented in a cornflower blue colour.

A later phase of the line is planned to continue north beyond Steeles Avenue (adjacent to the Brampton Gateway Terminal) along Main Street to Brampton GO Station north of Queen Street in downtown Brampton. The entire line was originally intended to be built in one phase, but in October 2015, Brampton City Council voted against allowing the LRT to run along the Main Street portion of the route because of concerns of low ridership projections, impacts on Brampton's historic downtown, and the preferences for an LRT along an alternate route. However, in January 2025, Ontario premier Doug Ford announced the extension of the line north of Steeles into downtown Brampton via a tunnel.

Construction began in 2020 with completion initially projected by the end of 2024. As of April 2026, Metrolinx has not publicly announced an expected completion date, insisting their presentation to Mississauga City Council be done in private. Mayor Carolyn Parrish has cited 2029 as the projected year.

== History ==
=== Background ===
The cities of Mississauga and Brampton have determined that rapid transit along Hurontario is required due to the chronic overcrowding of Mississauga's (and the suburban Greater Toronto Area's) busiest bus routes, 2/17 Hurontario, which carry more than 25,000 passengers a day, combined with the numerous high-density development proposals along the corridor and the high growth in both cities. They identified three options: light rail transit for the entire corridor, bus rapid transit for the entire corridor, or a combination of both (light rail south of Mississauga City Centre and bus rapid transit north of it). After three public information sessions, the residents of both cities favoured light rail transit along the full length of the corridor.

=== Costs ===
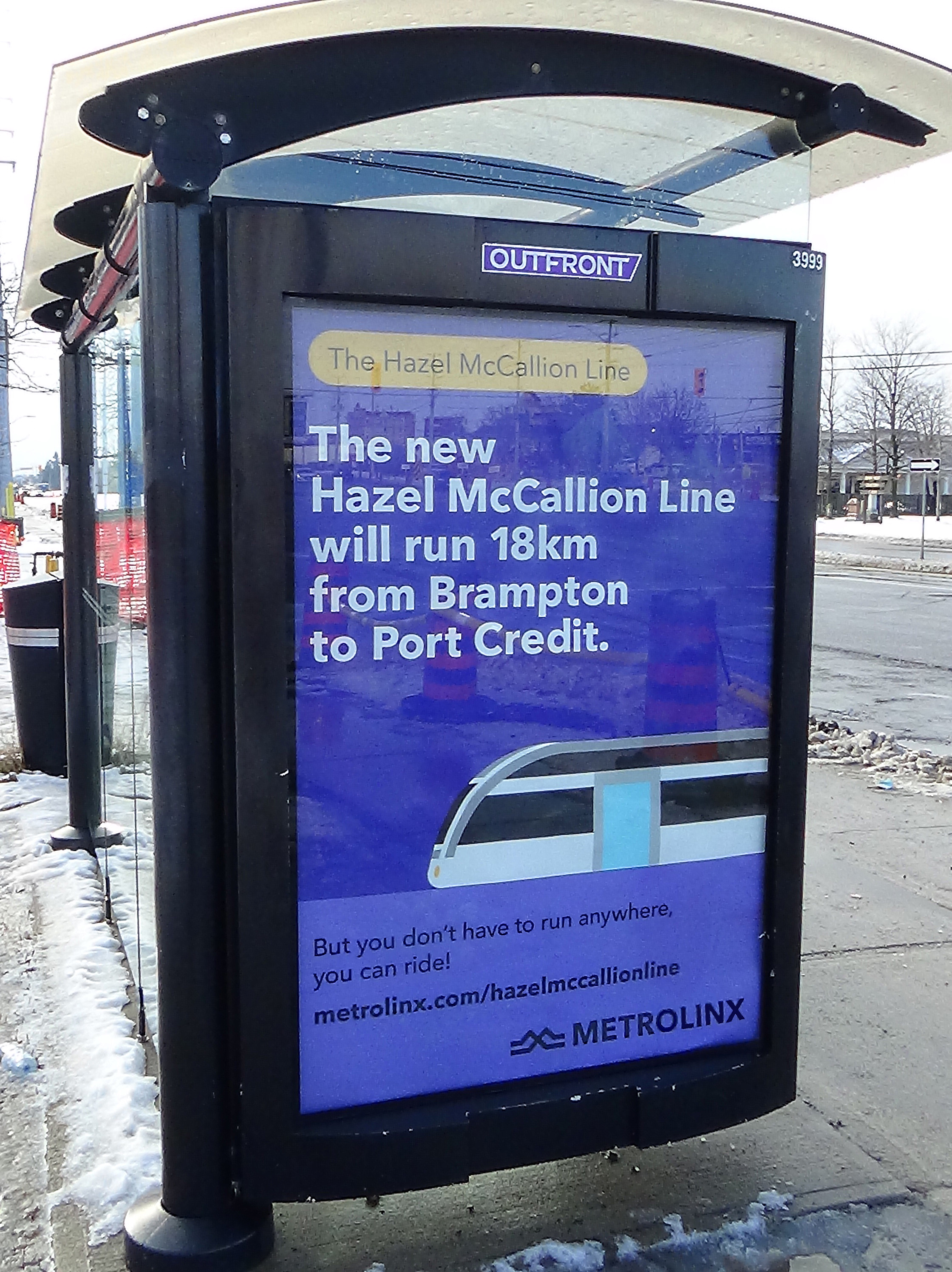
Bus shelter ad (using the Hazel McCallion Line name) for the Hurontario LRT from 2022

In 2016, the LRT line was projected to cost $1.4 billion. (Prior to the cancellation of the Brampton portion of the line, the estimated cost was around $1.6 billion.) On April 21, 2015, the Government of Ontario announced that it would completely fund the line, not including local capital costs such as utility relocations, surface upgrades, and landscaping.

When Mobilinx was chosen as the winning bidder, the total contract value was $5.6 billion. This included $4.6 billion to design, build and finance plus $1 billion to operate and maintain the line for 30 years. The line was previously costed at $1.2 billion for capital costs only. The City of Mississauga is expected to cover the operating and maintenance costs.

=== Benefits ===
Mississauga plans to use the Hurontario LRT to spur commercial development and employment opportunities along the line. By 2016, downtown development had consisted mostly of residential towers, as Ed Sajecki, Commissioner of Planning and Building for Mississauga, believed developers felt it was too expensive to provide parking for large office towers. Sajecki expected that the LRT will eliminate the need for downtown parking. With the LRT, downtown population was expected to double in less than two decades from the 2016 estimate of 40,000. According to then-Mayor Bonnie Crombie, Mississauga is planning for mixed-use zoning along Hurontario including accommodation, businesses, commercial, retail and arts-cultural development.

=== Criticism ===
- In 2015, many in Brampton were critical of the LRT's original route through the city's downtown. The fear was that the LRT on downtown Main Street would adversely affect the heritage aesthetics of old city centre. Brampton city council voted against the Main Street route, and Metrolinx initially cancelled the section on Main Street.
- Since 2019, Mississauga's mayor and city council have been disappointed with Metrolinx's decision to initially cancel the Mississauga City Centre loop in order to reduce costs.
- In January 2018, the residents of the Kingsbridge Garden Circle area were advocating for a stop in their area which would be between Highway 403 and Eglinton Avenue. The Eglinton & Hurontario stop would be the nearest, about 1 kilometre (0.62 mi) to the north. Residents claimed that 10,000 people live in the area. Mississauga's commissioner of transportation and works said the request came too late as procurement to construct the line was in progress. One estimate for the extra stop would be $850,000. In addition, some residents later advocated for the relocation of a proposed traction power substation near their neighborhood fearing it would be unsightly and lower property values. The substation would be a container-size structure that would sit in an expropriated area of a parking lot.
- Some residents in Mississauga and Brampton were concerned about disruptions due to construction, aesthetics and the cost of the project.
- Some residents have said that the LRT is stuck in construction chaos, has impeded traffic, and ultimately will do nothing to improve transit in Mississauga, as the LRT is replacing an existing bus route.

=== Design changes ===
==== Main Street extension ====
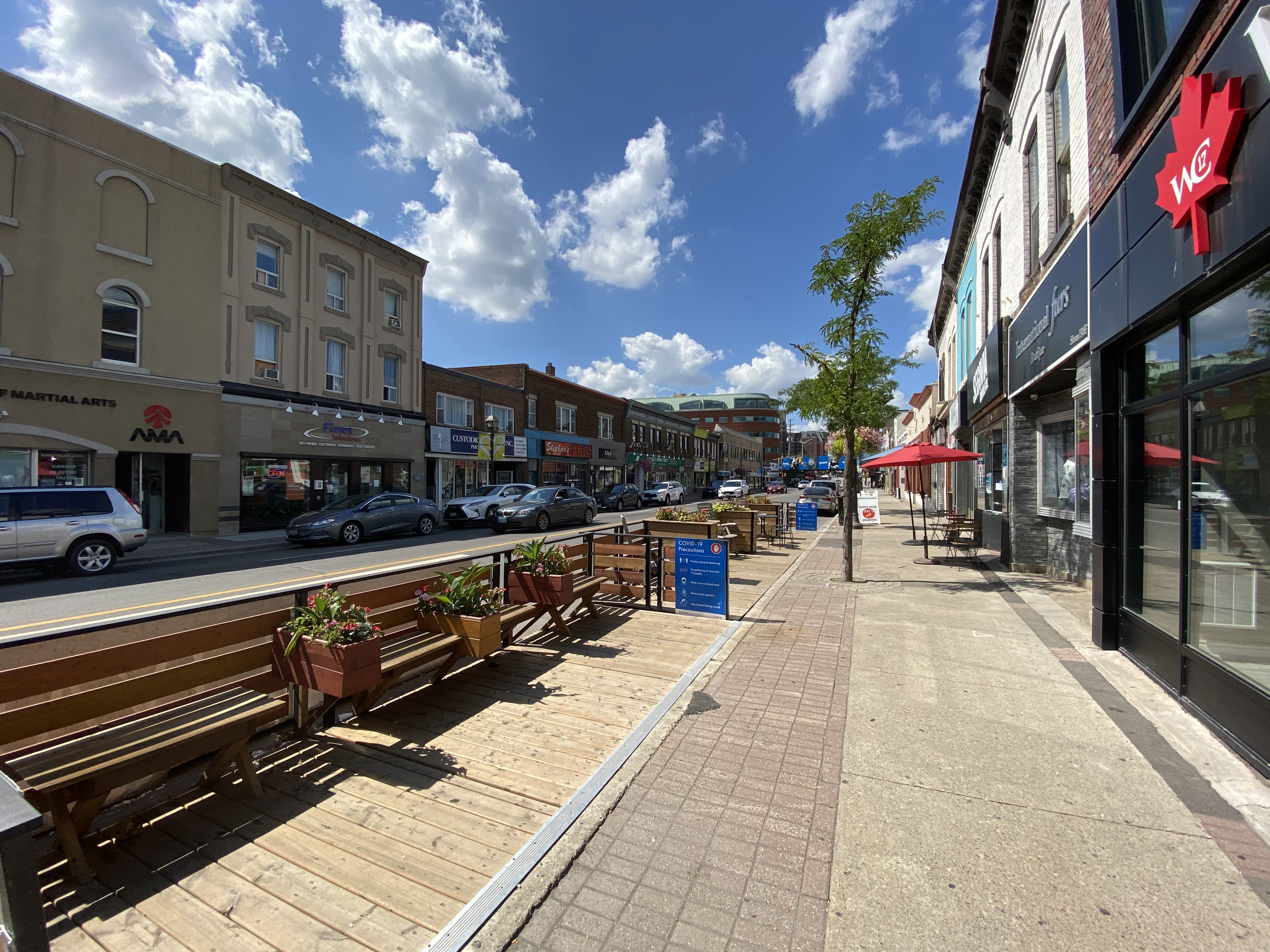
The cancelled section of the LRT route along Main Street in Brampton's heritage downtown

Before its cancellation, the Main Street route was controversial. At a Brampton Council meeting on July 8, 2015, five of the eleven councillors opposed to the Main Street route argued that the LRT plan was being directed by Mississauga with Brampton absent from negotiation. They demanded an alternative route funded by the provincial government.

On October 28, 2015, Brampton City Council voted 7–4 against allowing the LRT to run along Main Street through its heritage downtown area, as originally planned by the province. Without this agreement, the province has indicated it would move ahead with the project, terminating the LRT at Steeles Avenue/Brampton Gateway Terminal instead of Brampton GO Station. Opposed council members had also previously cited a lack of projected growth along the northern half of the proposed Brampton route to support an LRT.

Proponents said the Main Street route advocated by the province would have revived the city's struggling downtown core. However, opponents argued that the Main Street route lacked potential for ridership and future growth. According to City of Brampton's transit ridership data, the current ridership along Main Street has an average of 200 riders per hour per direction on weekdays and Brampton's downtown has a ridership of about 450 passengers an hour. Opponents were also concerned that running the LRT on Main Street in Brampton's historic downtown would diminish its heritage character and have an impact on downtown parking. There was also a concern that the city might have to pay up to $100 million for relocating utilities, road resurfacing, traffic redirection, landscaping, etc.

Although all councillors were in support of an LRT, they disagreed on the route it should take. Councillors opposing the Main Street route have proposed running the LRT east or west along Steeles Avenue and then north to Queen Street where it would then possibly continue east from Brampton's downtown area to the Bramalea GO Station or possibly all the way to the terminus of the western branch of the Toronto subway's Line 1 Yonge–University at Vaughan Metropolitan Centre. In March 2013, Brampton City Council asked city staff to consider two alternative routes north from Steeles Avenue, either (1) partially north on Main Street, east to Peel Memorial Hospital, north to Queen Street and west to Brampton GO Station, or (2) north on Kennedy Road, west on Queen Street to Brampton GO Station.

Metrolinx CEO Bruce McCuaig said the provincial money allocated to the Main Street route in Brampton would now be available for other transit projects across the province. However, McCuaig also said Metrolinx would be open to evaluate alternate transit proposals from Brampton for provincial funding for the next round of transit initiatives. On November 3, 2015, Transportation Minister Steven Del Duca announced that the funding for the cancelled Main Street route will be invested in priority transit projects in the Greater Toronto Area which might or might not include Brampton.

At its February 20, 2020, meeting, the Metrolinx Board of Directors endorsed a prioritization framework for a proposed Frequent Rapid Transit Network that was inclusive of a reinstated LRT extension from Brampton Gateway Terminal to Brampton GO Station; with a forecasted ridership of 5,500 in 2031 and a proposed line length of 3.3 km (2.1 mi) along Main Street, the project scored 'medium' with a preliminary benefit-cost ratio of 0.66–0.90.

In January 2022, Brampton city staff were working on two alternative plans to reinstate the LRT extension from Brampton Gateway Terminal to Brampton GO Station in downtown Brampton. One plan was to extend the LRT on the surface at a cost of $500 million. The alternative plan was to put most of the extension underground costing $1.7 billion. Brampton prefers the underground plan and is asking upper levels of government to cover the extra cost of the preferred plan. City Council approved the recommendation to progress the LRT extension study to 30% Preliminary Design and to prepare a Draft Environmental Project Report for both alternatives. Brampton needs to replace its aging water mains, and the choice between a surface or underground LRT extension must be made before Brampton can finish planning for water main replacement. Brampton politicians, including Mayor Patrick Brown, have been advocating for the Main Street extension. On February 27, 2023, Brampton Transit staff presented a project update to City Council, noting that design development updates and inflation have increased the costs of the surface alignment ($933 million) and underground alignment ($2.8 billion). City staff still recommend the underground alignment due to perceived benefits in travel time savings, infrastructure modifications, downtown revitalization, operations and maintenance, and protection for a future extension. Brampton's preferred underground option would have a surface stop at Charolais Boulevard and underground stops at Nanwood Drive and Brampton GO Station. With a surface alternative, all stops would be on the surface with an additional stop near Brampton City Hall.

==== City Centre loop ====
A roughly 2.5-kilometre (1.6 mi) branch-loop is planned around Mississauga City Centre and Square One Shopping Centre. The loop would serve most of the City Centre at a walking distance of 500 metres (1,600 ft), and include stops on Burnhamthorpe and Rathburn Roads, and a still-undecided north–south street. It was initially cancelled on March 21, 2019, when Metrolinx announced that the downtown loop would be dropped due to financial restrictions beyond the spur to the stop on Rathburn serving the City Centre Transit Terminal. Mississauga Mayor Bonnie Crombie indicated that the rest of the loop could be built as a later phase. In September 2021, it was listed as one of the city's six transportation priorities by Mississauga City Council.

On February 14, 2022, at the aforementioned press conference to rename the line after former Mayor Hazel McCallion, Premier Doug Ford offered to reinstate the loop but did not specify a time frame; it could be added after completion of the line. Mississauga politicians, including Mayor Bonnie Crombie, had been advocating for the loop's reinstatement. The original plan for the loop called for the north–south leg to follow Duke of York Boulevard, but Crombie planned for a route further west along Confederation Parkway. In early 2026, Ford announced that the estimated cost of the city centre loop would be $1.6 billion with the province providing financing.

==== Approval ====
By January 18, 2024, the Ontario Minister of Transportation had requested that Metrolinx provide an initial business case by February 5 for constructing both the Main Street extension and the Mississauga City Centre loop. Three weeks later, on February 8, the Ontario government approved both projects, but did not specify stop locations for either or if the Main Street extension would be tunnelled or at-grade (either as LRT or a mixed-traffic streetcar) through Brampton's downtown. However, on January 24, 2025, it was announced by Premier Doug Ford that the downtown Brampton extension would be mostly tunnelled.

=== Other design changes ===
Circa 2010, the LRT was to have extended south of Lakeshore Road turning west on Port Street terminating at Elizabeth Street. At a 2013 open house, local residents objected to this extension as an invasion of a residential area and an inconvenience for pedestrians and motorists using the street. The Port Street extension was subsequently dropped; thus, the LRT would terminate at the Port Credit stop beside the GO station.

On March 21, 2019, in addition to cancelling the City Centre loop, Metrolinx also cancelled a stop at Highway 407 and a pedestrian bridge at Cooksville GO Station to reduce project costs.

Originally, the Brampton Gateway stop was to be located on the north side of Steeles Avenue. After the cancelation of the Main Street segment of the line in 2015, the City of Brampton asked Metrolinx to relocate the stop to the south side to allow for a future extension north along either Kennedy Road or McLaughlin Road. Thus, Metrolinx changed the stop location. However, by January 2022, Brampton reversed its decision and requested that the stop be moved back to the north side so that riders would not have to cross Steeles Avenue to transfer between the LRT and the bus terminal. Metrolinx said they would consider Brampton's request out of safety concerns.

According to a published 2017 design, the LRT would occupy the centre median of Hurontario Street as it crossed over the Highway 403 intersection on a bridge. At the southern approach to the bridge, there would be a junction for an LRT branch to the Mississauga City Centre, and the junction would have crossed the southbound traffic lanes of Hurontario Street and a Highway 403 exit ramp at grade. By 2021, this design had changed to locate the line on the west side of Hurontario Street on elevated guideways. One guideway would run north from Square One Drive and cross over Rathburn Road. A second guideway would continue the line over Highway 403. Between these two guideways, there would be a junction to a branch on a third guideway descending to City Centre.

=== Procurement ===
In 2010, Metrolinx placed an order for 182 Flexity Freedom vehicles manufactured by Bombardier for use on the light rail lines it was building in Greater Toronto. However, by 2016, Bombardier was having delivery problems supplying vehicles for the Eglinton Crosstown LRT (officially Line 5 Eglinton). Thus, Metrolinx would seek another vehicle supplier for its other LRT lines.

Infrastructure Ontario (IO) and Metrolinx decided to deliver the Hurontario LRT project according to IO's Alternative Financing and Procurement (AFP) model which basically is a public–private partnership arrangement.

On October 18, 2016, IO and Metrolinx started the procurement process by issuing a request for qualifications to design, build, operate and maintain the Hurontario LRT. The request said bidders could offer to supply 44 light rail vehicles, which implied that Metrolinx would break its contract with Bombardier for the delivery of Flexity Freedom vehicles.

On June 6, 2017, IO and Metrolinx announced that three teams had been shortlisted:

- Hurontario Light Rail Connection Partners (HLCP) including equity providers Cintra, Colas and Acciona. In the HLCP team, the constructors are Acciona, Ferrovial, Colas, DPM Energy and LURA Consulting. The designers are Arup, SENER, Dillon Consulting, DTAH and Grimshaw. Operation and maintenance would be provided by RATP Dev, Acciona, and Colas Rail.
- Mobilinx including equity providers Astaldi, John Laing, Hitachi-Ansaldo STS Transdev and Amico. In the Mobilinx team, the constructors are Astaldi, Hitachi, Amico and Bot. The designers are IBI, Hitachi, Morrison Hershfield, Arcadis and Daoust Lestage. Operation and maintenance would be provided by Transdev, Hitachi-Ansaldo and Astaldi.
- Trillium Transit Partners including equity providers Kiewit, Meridiam and Keolis. In this team, the constructors are Peter Kiewit Sons, Bird, Mass Electric, Black and MacDonald and Coco Paving. The designers are Stantec Consulting, STV, Perkins + Will, Urban Strategies and Entuitive. Operation and maintenance would be provided by Keolis.

On December 1, 2017, IO and Metrolinx announced that the route would employ 44 Citadis Spirit vehicles, from Alstom to be manufactured at a new assembly plant in Brampton. These vehicles are longer and have higher capacity than the Flexity Freedom vehicles purchased by Metrolinx for the Eglinton Crosstown LRT. Subsequently, Metrolinx decided to initially use only 28 vehicles on the line.

On May 23, 2019, IO and Metrolinx announced that proposals had been submitted by only two of the three shortlisted teams of private companies, namely Mobilinx and Trillium Transit Partners. Hurontario Light Rail Connection Partners did not submit a proposal.

On October 21, 2019, IO and Metrolinx announced that Mobilinx had been awarded the contract to design, build, finance, operate, and maintain the Hurontario LRT for a period of 30 years. The total contract value was $4.6 billion with a completion date of the fourth quarter of 2024 was set in the announcement. John Laing Group, Astaldi, Transdev, Amico, and Hitachi are part of the consortium.

=== Construction ===
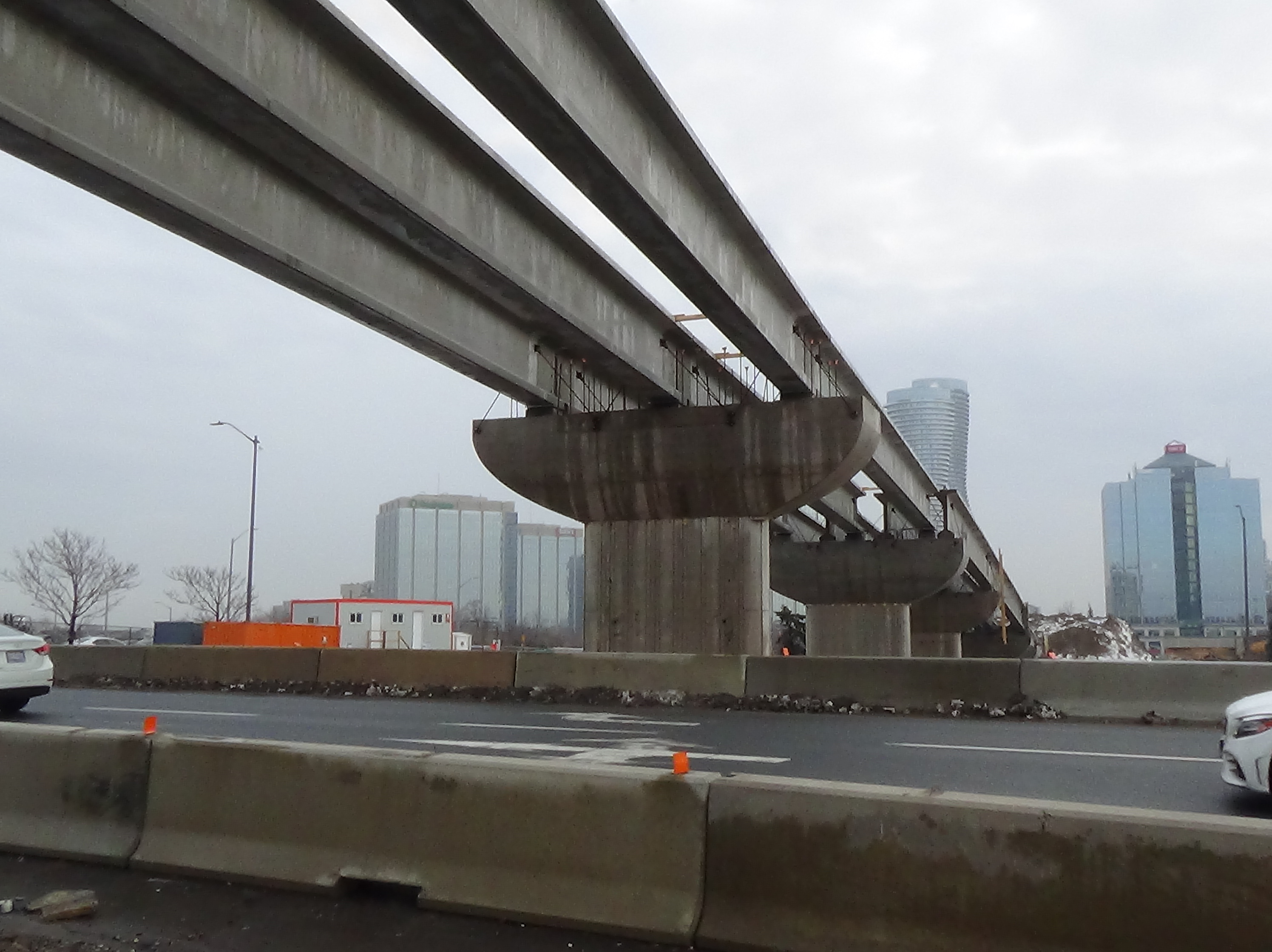
Elevated guideway construction over the eastbound exit ramp of Highway 403 in December 2022

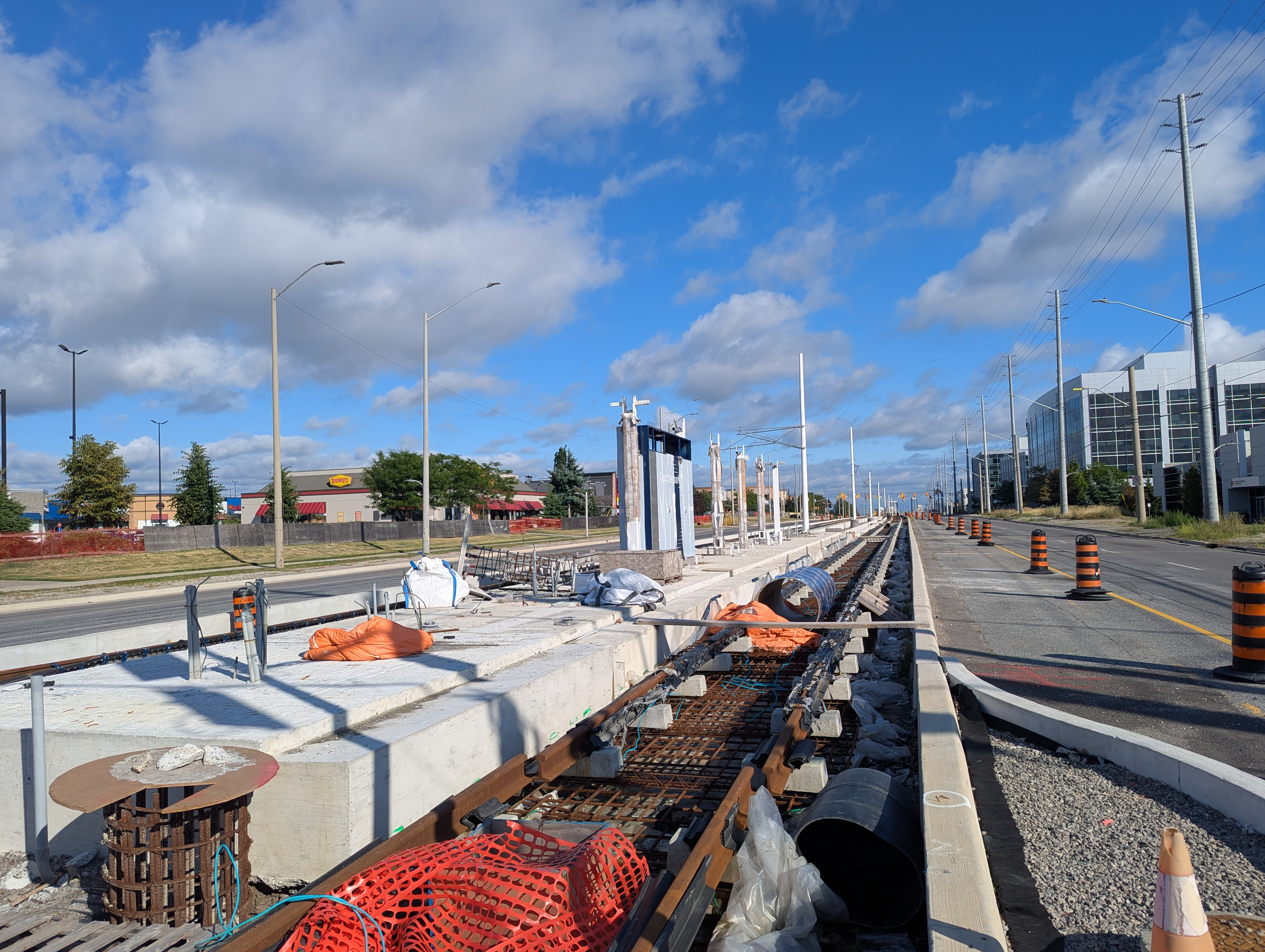
Construction progress of Courtneypark station in August 2025

In spring 2020, construction started on the Operations, Maintenance and Storage Facility, just south of Highway 407.

By January 2021, excavation work had started to build the LRT's below-ground Port Credit station in a trench adjacent to the Port Credit GO Station, and Mobilinx constructed the passage for the LRT under the Lakeshore West line tracks using the Verona System. Three temporary bridges were constructed under the GO line using piles and beams. A hollow, concrete "push box" structure was constructed in the trench and was pushed under the railway line using hydraulic jacks while excavation cleared a path. This was done without disrupting overhead railway traffic with most work having been done at night. The temporary bridges were removed with the GO tracks lying on top of the push box that will be a permanent part of the LRT infrastructure. This work was completed by June 2023, with the push box ready to be converted into a 46-metre (151 ft) tunnel under the GO railway tracks for the LRT line.

In related work, a wider channel and flood walls are being added to Mary Fix Creek which runs on the north side of the Lakeshore West right-of-way before curving on the west side of the LRT right-of-way. The road bridge over the creek at Inglewood Drive will be replaced by a new bridge further south opposite Eaglewood Boulevard which will be extended west from Hurontario Street. At Eaglewood and Hurontario, there will be a new signalized intersection with the LRT crossing Eaglewood between the creek and the west side of Hurontario.

By April 2022, the first tracks were being laid at the Operations, Maintenance and Storage Facility (OMSF). In later phases of construction, LRT tracks will be laid on Hurontario Street north and south from the junction to the OMSF. By July 2022, construction started on the guideway on Hurontario Street working northbound from Matheson Boulevard to Britannia Road. At the operations, maintenance and storage facility, 15 metres (49 ft) of track had already been laid. Track construction started in September 2022 at various intersections along Hurontario Street between Sandstone Drive (south of Britannia Road) and Matheson Boulevard.

On Hurontario Street at the Queen Elizabeth Way, the push box technique was used to create new northbound traffic lanes under the QEW so that the space for the current northbound lanes can be used for the LRT.

On March 8, 2023, the first of 13 traction substations to convert from AC to DC and to provide electricity for the trains, each housed within a steel structure about the size of a shipping container, was installed at Skyway Drive and Hurontario Street. The next two substations to be installed along Hurontario Street will be at Britannia Road and Topflight Drive, the latter street providing LRV access between the Operations, Maintenance and Storage Facility and the mainline.

In March 2025, it was discovered that the construction of the wye at Hurontario Street and Topflight Drive, which will lead to the OMSF, and the tracks along Topflight were faulty and needed to be completely rebuilt. The reconstruction began that April, and was completed in the summer of 2026. That August 12, Metrolinx announced the line would be structurally completed by August 2027.

=== Line testing ===
The first vehicle test was carried out on August 12, 2026, at a walking pace along the Topflight Drive/Edwards Boulevard non-revenue trackage between the junction with Hurontario Street and the OMSF using an Alstom Citadis Spirit testing unit.

On September 21, the first testing along Hurontario itself occurred at night south to the future Derry Road stop.

== Route ==
Schematic map of the Hurontario LRT (Phase 1)

=== Description ===
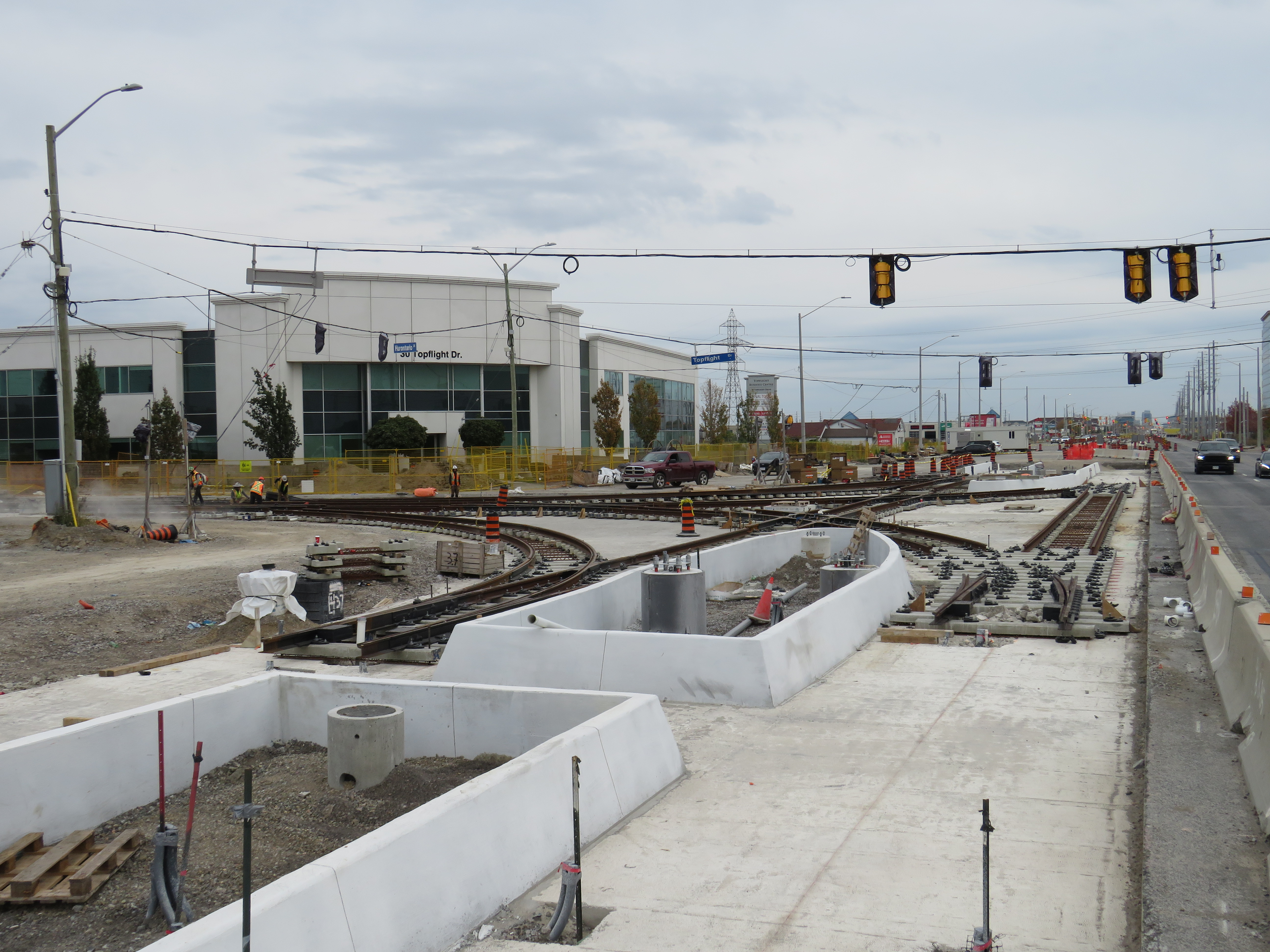
Laying the original wye trackage (before the 2025 rebuild) at Topflight Drive that will lead to the OMSF in October 2023

The 18-kilometre (11 mi) LRT line will have a dedicated right-of-way throughout the entire corridor. Most of the corridor will be along Hurontario Street with the LRT in a reserved centre median and with two lanes in each direction for general traffic plus turning lanes. General traffic will cross tracks only at major signalized intersections.

The LRT line will begin at the Port Credit GO Station where the LRT station will be below grade on the west side of Hurontario Street just east of the GO station building. After passing under GO transit's Lakeshore West line, the LRT will continue north for about 250 metres (820 ft) on the west side of Hurontario Street before crossing over to the LRT's centre median. The line will cross under the Queen Elizabeth Way along the former northbound lanes of Hurontario, with new northbound lanes for road traffic passing beneath the QEW in a new tunnel. At Dundas Street, the LRT could connect to a proposed Dundas bus rapid transit. The LRT will indirectly connect to Cooksville GO Station using the LRT's Cooksville stop at John Street.

Further north, between the Robert Speck stop and Highway 403, the line will switch to the west side of Hurontario Street and run onto an elevated guideway. Midway across this guideway there will be a Y-junction for a spur descending to Rathburn Road and terminating at the Mississauga City Centre stop. Here there will be connections to the Mississauga Transitway and the City Centre Transit Terminal, and access to Square One Shopping Centre. To leave the stop, light-rail trains must reverse back to the mainline, before crossing over Highway 403 on the elevated guideway and returning to centre median running on Hurontario on the north side of the highway.

The first stop north of Highway 403 will be at Eglinton Avenue, with stops at Bristol Road, Matheson Boulevard, Britannia Road, Courtneypark Drive, and Derry Road. North of Derry, at Topflight Drive, there will be a junction to the line's maintenance and storage facility. The line will then enter Brampton, with two stops at Ray Lawson Drive and the north leg of County Court Boulevard before terminating at the Brampton Gateway Terminal on Steeles Avenue, which offers connections to the 511 Züm Steeles BRT line.

=== Stations and connections ===
There will be one grade-separated station (at Port Credit GO) and 18 on-street stops throughout the corridor with an average spacing of 850 metres (2,790 ft) and will feature 90-metre (300 ft) platforms. They are expected to have heated shelters, CCTV cameras, real-time information system and bicycle lockers. Most of them will feature secondary entrances, but since most of the corridor is currently suburban in nature, these secondary entrances create mid-block crossings throughout Hurontario and Main Streets, which enhance pedestrian access.

In January 2018, a consultation process was started to select unique and memorable names for the stops. The stop at Central Parkway was named "Fairview" as there is already a Central Parkway station on the Mississauga Transitway. Note: Bus routes running along Hurontario Street are not listed except at bus terminals or route endpoints.

List of stops
Stop name	City	Stop location	Platform	Connections
Brampton Gateway	Brampton	Steeles Avenue	Centre, south side (Note: In January 2022, the City of Brampton requested that the Brampton Gateway stop be moved from the south side of Steeles Avenue to its north side so that riders would not have to cross Steeles Avenue to transfer between the LRT and the bus terminal.)	Routes serve the adjacent Brampton Gateway Terminal: Brampton Transit bus routes; 502 Züm Main; 511/511A/511C Züm Steeles
County Court	Brampton	Sir Lou Drive – County Court Boulevard	Centre, north side	Brampton Transit bus routes
Ray Lawson	Brampton	Ray Lawson Boulevard – County Court Boulevard	Centre, north side	Brampton Transit bus routes
Derry	Mississauga	Derry Road	Centre, north side	MiWay bus routes; Brampton Transit bus routes
Courtneypark	Mississauga	Courtneypark Drive	Centre, south side	MiWay bus routes; Brampton Transit bus routes
Britannia	Mississauga	Britannia Road	Centre, south side	MiWay bus routes
Matheson	Mississauga	Matheson Boulevard	Centre, north side	MiWay bus routes
Bristol	Mississauga	Bristol Road	Centre, north side	MiWay bus routes
Eglinton	Mississauga	Eglinton Avenue	Centre, north side	MiWay bus routes
Mississauga City Centre	Mississauga	City Centre Transit Terminal; Square One Bus Terminal	East side on Rathburn Rd W near Station Gate Rd	MiWay bus routes; 502 Züm Main; Mississauga Transitway; Square One Bus Terminal
Robert Speck	Mississauga	Robert Speck Parkway	Centre, north side	MiWay bus routes
Burnhamthorpe	Mississauga	Burnhamthorpe Road	Centre, south side	MiWay bus routes
Fairview (Note: The Fairview stop, located adjacent to Central Parkway, is named after the Fairview neighbourhood. There is already a Central Parkway stop on the Mississauga Transitway; thus, Fairview was chosen as the LRT stop name.)	Mississauga	Central Parkway	Centre, north side	MiWay bus routes
Cooksville	Mississauga	John Street	Centre, north side	MiWay bus routes; Cooksville GO Station on Milton line
Dundas & Hurontario	Mississauga	Dundas Street	Centre, south side	MiWay routes; Future Dundas Street BRT
Queensway	Mississauga	Queensway	Centre, south side	MiWay bus routes (adjacent to Mississauga Hospital)
North Service	Mississauga	North Service Road	Centre, north side	
Mineola	Mississauga	Mineola Road	Centre, south side	MiWay bus routes
Port Credit	Mississauga	Port Credit GO Station	Below-grade station: centre, west side of Hurontario, south of the Lakeshore West line tracks	MiWay bus routes; Port Credit GO Station on Lakeshore West line

=== Operations ===
The LRT is planned to run every 7.5 minutes during rush hours, and every 10–12 minutes for the rest of the week. Service hours on the LRT corridor are planned to be between 5:00 AM and 1:30 AM Mondays to Saturdays and 7:00 AM to 12:00 AM on Sundays and holidays. Bus service is expected to supplement the remaining hours, making the Hurontario corridor have a 24/7 transit operation. LRT trains will take 40 minutes to travel the whole route, compared to 58 minutes by private automobile.

The LRT is planned to have multiple-unit trains, carrying up to about 600 people. Stops will have platforms of at least 90 metres (300 ft) long to accommodate them.

The line will be served by 28 Alstom Citadis Spirit light rail trainsets that will be 100 percent low-floor for accessibility. Each will be 48 metres (157 ft) long and can carry up to 292 riders sitting and standing depending on the seating arrangement. Although the trains can reach speeds of 100 kilometres per hour (62 mph), the actual operating speed will be lower.

Vehicles will be stored and maintained at the new Operations, Maintenance and Storage Facility (OMSF) adjacent to a hydro corridor and Highway 407. The OMSF will occupy 84,386 square metres (908,320 sq ft) of land providing room for expansion. The main building will have an area of 10,634 square metres (114,460 sq ft) and contain five through tracks, a vehicle repair shop, a cleaning facility and material storage. Its second floor will contain offices and control rooms for operational staff, meeting rooms and staff break rooms. There will be 12 exterior tracks in the yard. The facility will be able to hold up to 42 light rail vehicles (LRV's), allowing room for expansion. Rail access from the OMSF will be via Edwards Boulevard and Topflight Drive to a junction with the main line on Hurontario.

=== Existing bus service ===
Hurontario Street Corridor interim service plan
Route	Terminus		Service span and average frequency						Connecting services
Route	Terminus		AM rush	Midday	PM rush	Evening	Saturdays	Sundays	Connecting services
103; Hurontario Express	Mississauga Hospital	Brampton Gateway Terminal	10	10	10	20	20	22	Brampton Transit/Züm; MiWay; GO Transit
502; Züm Main	City Centre Transit Terminal	Sandalwood Parkway	9	14	9	20	20	20	Brampton Transit/Züm; MiWay; GO Transit
2 Main (Brampton Transit)	Highway 407 Park and Ride	Heart Lake Terminal	20	20	20	30	30	30	Brampton Transit/Züm; MiWay; GO Transit
2 Hurontario (South) (MiWay)	Port Credit GO Station	City Centre Transit Terminal	10	10	10	15–20	15–20	15–20	Brampton Transit/Züm; MiWay; GO Transit
17; Hurontario (North)	City Centre Transit Terminal	Highway 407 Park and Ride	10	10	10	15–20	15–20	15–20	Brampton Transit/Züm; MiWay; GO Transit

On May 16, 2011, MiWay realigned service along Hurontario to include limited-stop service (Route 202) during Saturdays for passengers wishing to bypass Square One.

On September 6, 2011, Brampton Transit launched its second bus rapid transit line, Route 502 Züm Main, which runs from Sandalwood Parkway to Mississauga City Centre all week long. This route replaced MiWay's 102 Intercity Express. Züm buses run every 10 minutes during rush hours and 20 minutes during off-peak hours and weekends. The frequency of its local counterpart, 2 Main, was reduced to boost ridership in the express service.

At the same date, MiWay replaced 202 Hurontario with a new route, 103 Hurontario Express, which offers additional mid-day and evening services. Its local counterpart, 19 Hurontario, was cut to GO Transit's Highway 407 Park and Ride to fortify the overlapping express services, however its frequency was further increased to address ongoing overcrowding issues between Britannia and Lakeshore Roads, the busiest section of the corridor. 103 Hurontario Express runs every 17.5 minutes during rush hours, 19 minutes during middays and 24 minutes during Saturdays.

In 2013, Brampton mayor Susan Fennell had proposed to run the 502 Züm Main along the entire LRT route to Port Credit GO as a temporary measure. This would have given Brampton transit users access to the all-day, two-way GO Transit train service at Port Credit. Then-Mississauga Mayor Hazel McCallion rejected the alternative proposal, citing gridlock south of Mississauga City Centre as a reason.

On May 5, 2014, MiWay realigned service along Hurontario corridor once again to provide more 10-minute service on daytime along the express route during weekdays, while cutting Routes 19A, 19B, and 19C for the local service south of Mississauga Hospital, leaving only the main branch of Route 19 to serve the entire Mississauga portion of the corridor from Highway 407 to Port Credit.

On April 27, 2020, Miway has split the route 19 Hurontario into two routes: 2 Hurontario (South) operating between City Centre and Port Credit GO Station and 17 Hurontario (North) operating between the Highway 407 Park & Ride and City Centre to improve reliability during the LRT construction; while on August 3, 2020, route 103 Hurontario Express was truncated to end at the Mississauga Hospital discontinuing express service south of the hospital to Port Credit GO Station.

== Gallery ==
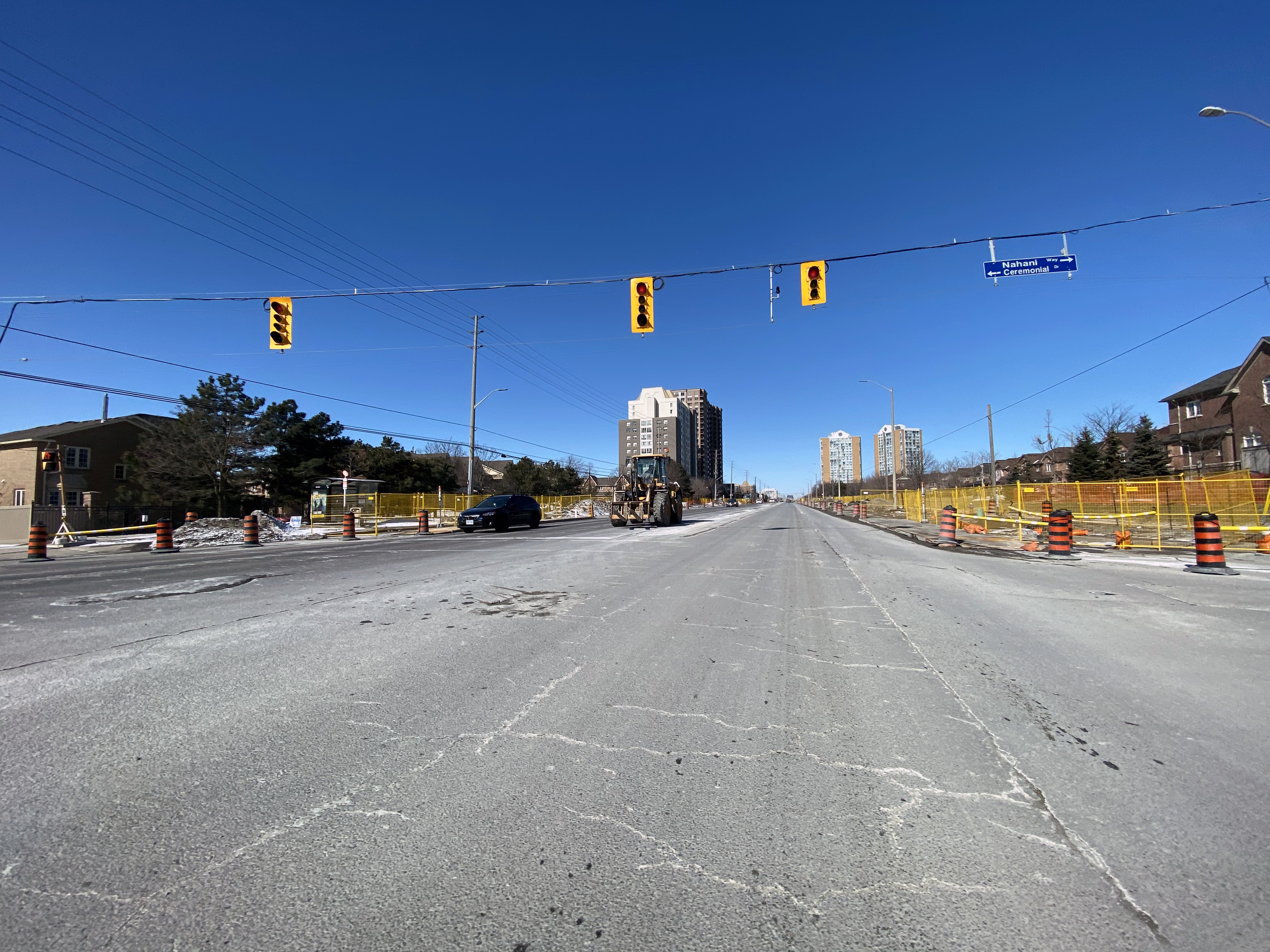
Early LRT construction works in March 2022

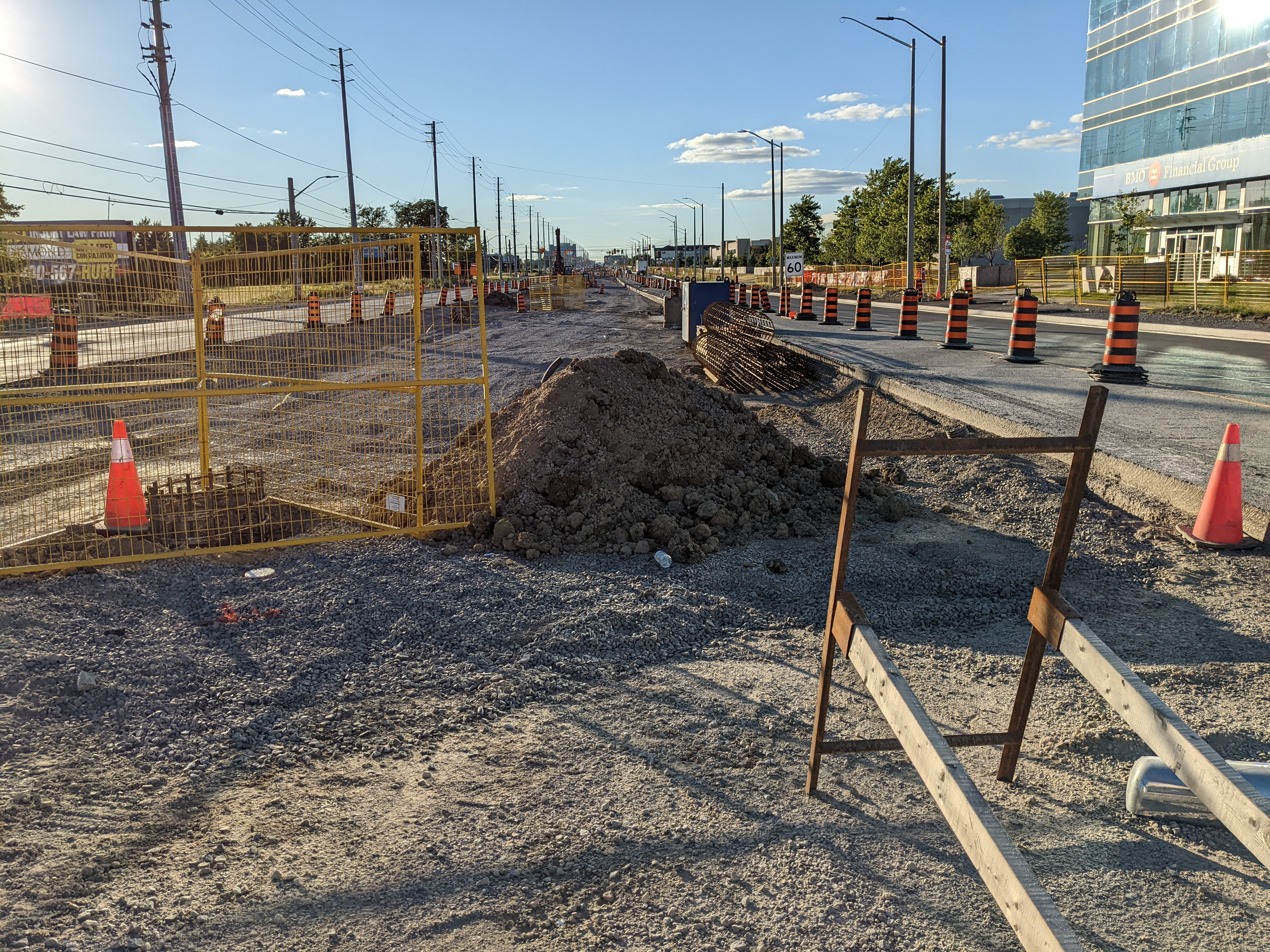
Construction of Courtneypark Stop in August 2022

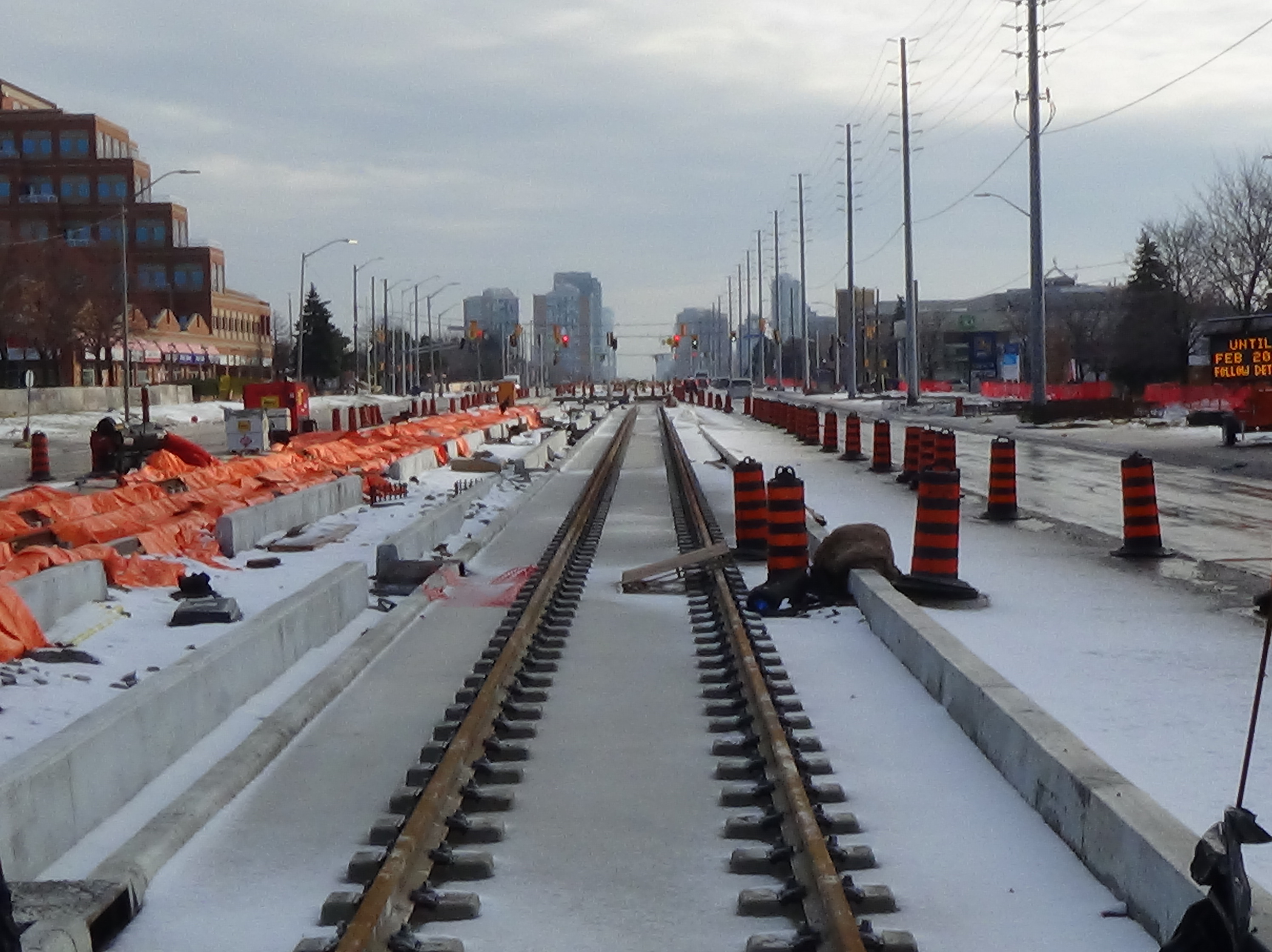
Early track construction at Traders Boulevard / Aldridge Street in December 2022

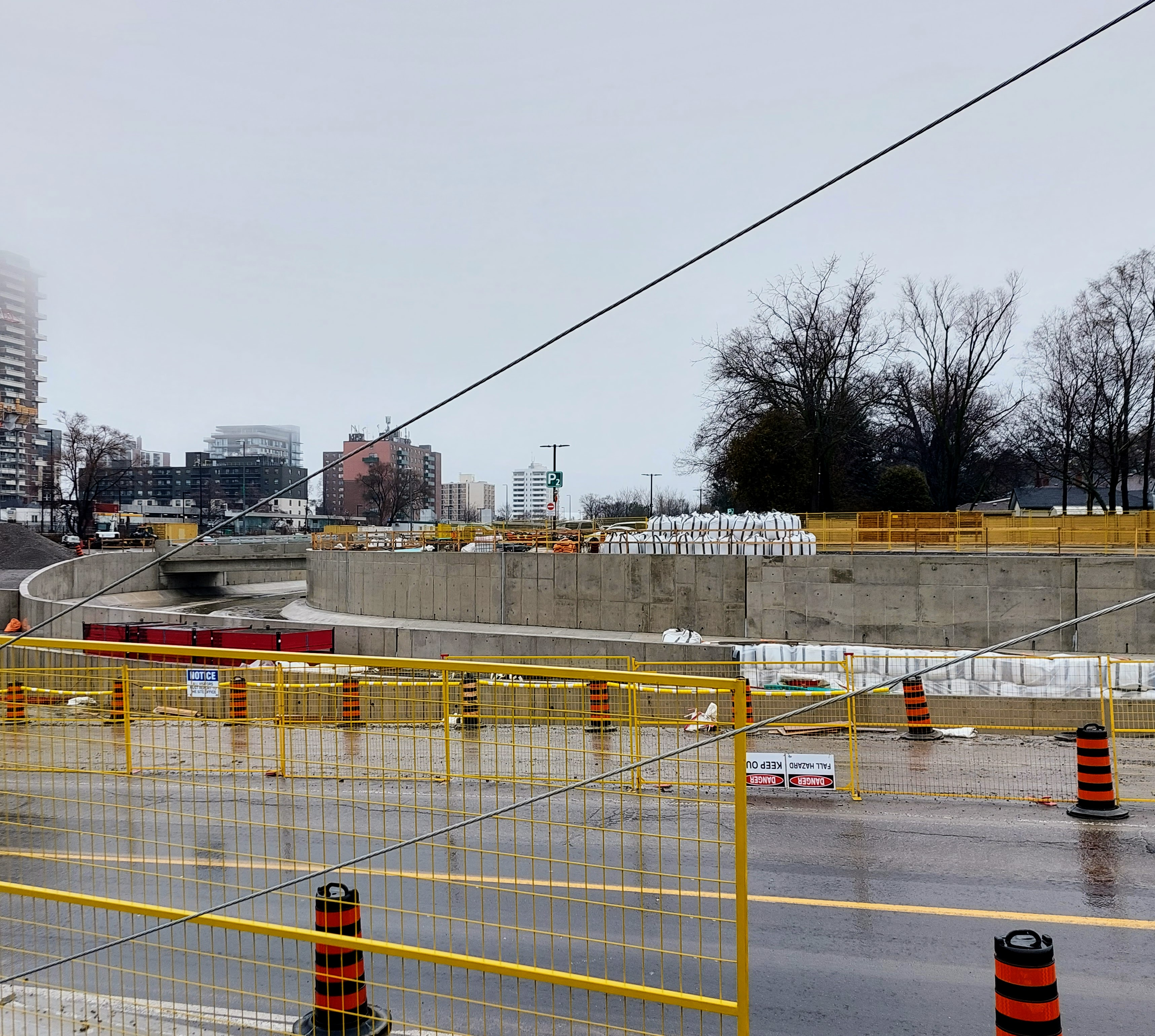
Port Credit construction February 2023

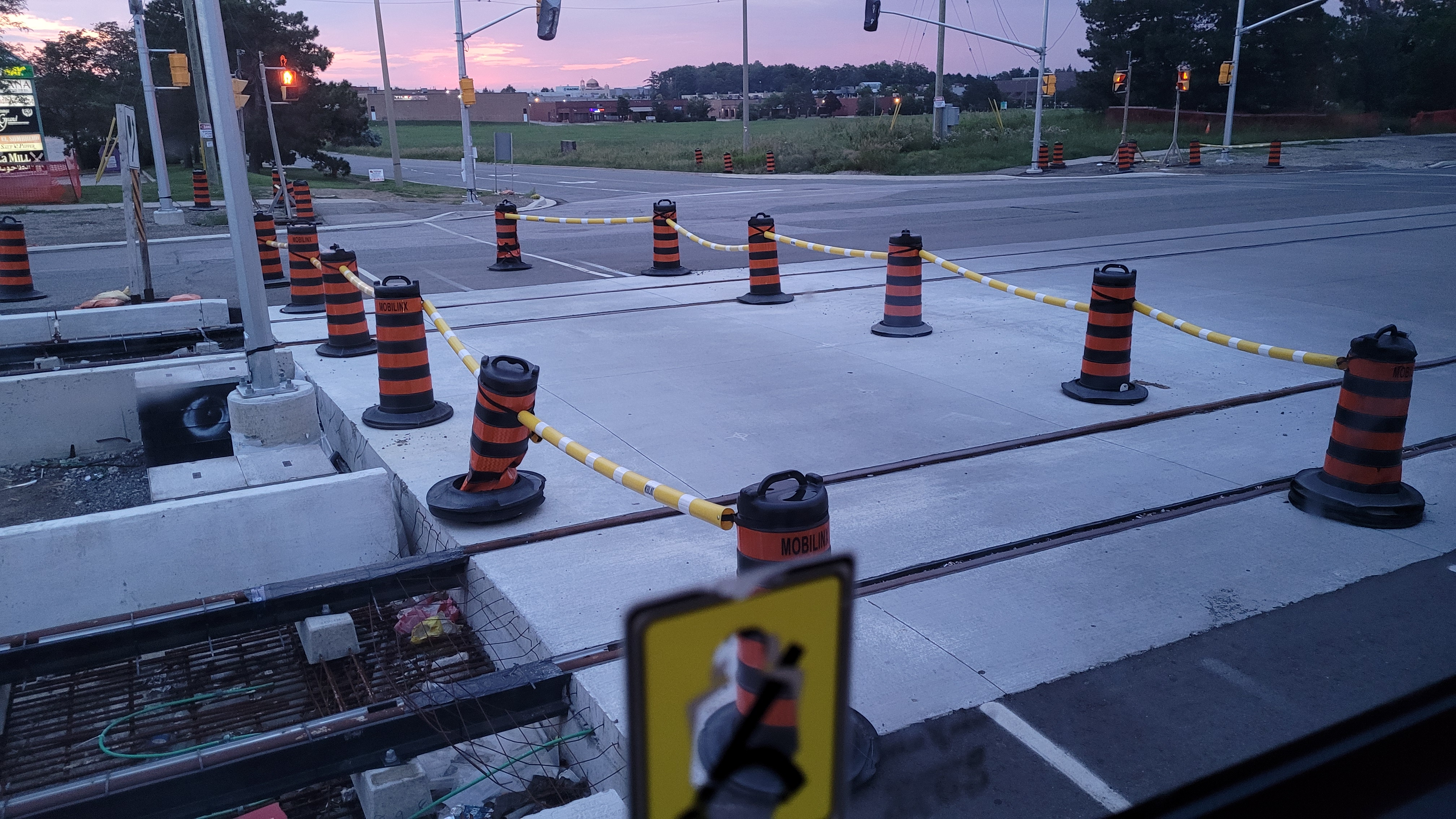
LRT tracks laid at Sandstone Drive / Brunel Road in August 2023

== See also ==
- Mississauga Transitway
- 502 Züm Main
- Line 6 Finch West: another Metrolinx LRT project that uses the Alstom Citadis Spirit
