= Milton line =

Commuter rail service in Ontario, Canada

Milton
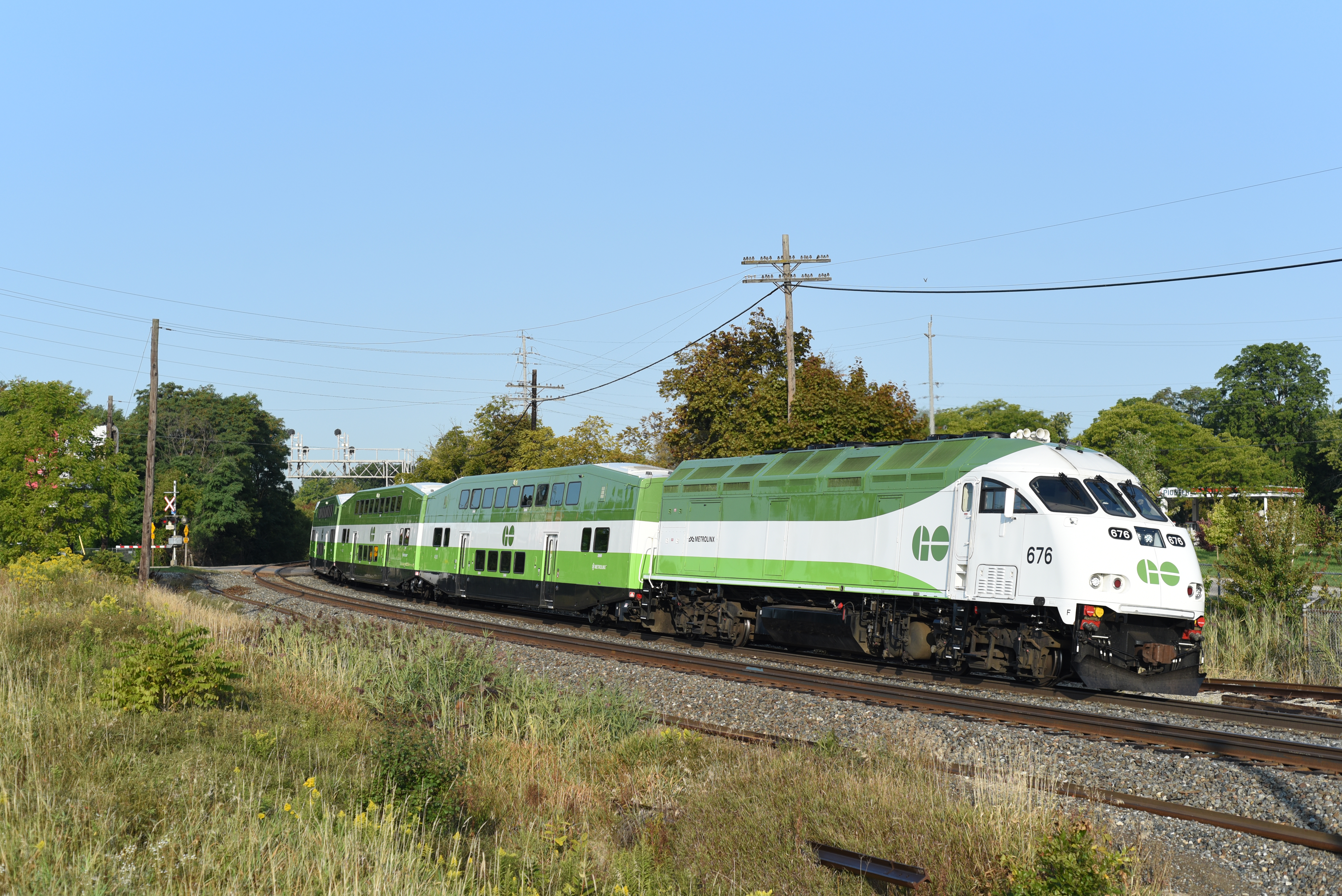
- A GO train east of Streetsville GO Station in Mississauga

Overview
- Service type: Commuter rail
- System: GO Transit rail services
- Locale: Greater Toronto Area
- First service: October 25, 1981; 45 years ago
- Current operator: Alstom
- Daily ridership: 15,300 (2019)

Route
- Termini: Union; Milton
- Stops: 9
- Distance travelled: 50.2 km (31.2 mi)

Technical
- Rolling stock: MPI MP40PH-3C; MPI MP54AC; EMD F59PH; Bombardier BiLevel Coach
- Track gauge: 1,435 mm (4 ft 8 1/2 in) standard gauge
- Operating speed: 75 mph (120 km/h)
- Average length: 10–12 coaches
- Track owners: Metrolinx; Canadian Pacific Kansas City

The Milton line is one of the seven train lines of the GO Transit system in the Greater Toronto Area, Ontario, Canada. It extends from Union Station in Toronto to Milton, by way of Mississauga. It opened on October 25, 1981.

Trains on the Milton line run in the peak direction during peak periods. The Ontario government, through its crown agency Metrolinx, is working to have more train service along the Milton line over the next decade, through the GO Expansion program. During peak hours, trains would run in peak direction every 15 minutes along this line. The Milton line is the fourth-busiest GO Transit line in the rail network.

== History ==
GO Transit explored expansion options along the Canadian Pacific Railway line through what is now Mississauga and Halton as early as 1969, but planning started in 1975 with negotiations with municipal governments and the Canadian Pacific Railway. Station location selection was completed in March 1977 as was the acquisition of the lands for the Dixie GO Station and the line received formal approval from the Management Board in 1978. However, due to equipment shortages and earlier funding pressures the opening date was moved from 1979 to 1981.

Following a promotional opening on Sunday October 25, 1981, regular service began the following Monday. Six trips were operated from 2002–2009 and five before this. From 2009–2011, there were seven inbound and seven outbound train trips daily. An eighth train was added to the morning and afternoon runs in 2011 and a ninth train started on January 5, 2015. On February 25, 2016, a tenth train was announced for the 2016–17 fiscal year, as part of the 2016 Ontario budget process.

Bus service was expanded into the cities of Cambridge, Kitchener and Waterloo in October 2009. Several bus routes operate between the University of Waterloo and Wilfrid Laurier University in Waterloo, the Charles Street Transit Terminal in Kitchener, and the Cambridge SmartCentre shopping centre to the Square One Bus Terminal in central Mississauga, including a small number of trips connecting with the train service at Milton GO Station.

In September 2016, GO Transit created a new bus service to connect Cambridge and Milton on weekday mornings during peak travel times, with six return trips in the evening. This bus route averaged only five passengers per trip and was cancelled in June 2019 due to low demand.

In April 2015, Metrolinx in partnership with the Town of Milton launched a pilot project through an app called Rideco which allows GO riders to book transportation to and from the Milton GO Station. This is due to the Milton station's parking lot being full by the time the second morning train arrives. As North America's fastest growing community for the last decade, the parking lot has increasing been in demand by new residents and those driving in from Cambridge.

== Service expansion ==
Improvements to the Milton line were proposed in The Big Move, Ontario's regional transportation plan (RTP) published in 2008. As part of the plan, there would be two-way, all-day rail service to Milton, slated to be in place within 15 years of the announcement (by 2023). In 2013, The Big Move was updated and Milton line enhancements were shifted to a 16-to-25-year planning horizon. The update also cut back the western terminus of two-way service to Meadowvale GO Station in Mississauga. Improvements to the line would therefore not service Lisgar station in Mississauga, nor Milton's station, service which had been promised by the provincial Liberals Halton candidate during the 2011 election.

As a result of this deferral to a longer-term timeline for the improvements, Milton town councillor Rick DiLorenzo has referred to the Milton line as the "orphan" of Metrolinx. Regional Chair Gary Carr said it feels like the rug was being pulled from underneath them with these sudden changes that affected Halton towns such as Milton and Georgetown. "If the Big Move projects benefiting Halton are delayed, Halton will not be able to meet provincial growth plan targets. The transportation system mode split and level of service objectives will not be met," said Tim Dennis, Halton's regional transportation services director.

An objective of the update to The Big Move was to align The Big Move with GO 2020, a transportation plan published by GO Transit in 2008. GO 2020 called for all-day 30-minute service to Meadowvale with bus connections to Milton. It also proposed 15-minutes service to Meadowvale in peak periods with express service during high-demand periods. Reports cited "significant infrastructure and operational challenges that mean it will not be possible to deliver two-way, all-day service all the way to Milton in the 15-year time horizon. Additional tracks and potentially numerous grade separations are necessary are a prerequisite to the expansion of service to Milton. The construction is especially challenging through built-up areas. This rail corridor is largely owned by CPR, a private third party operating freight rail. Their approval is required for any service and infrastructure expansion. Two-way, all-day service can be delivered to Meadowvale in the 15-year timeframe, but the full extension to Milton can only be delivered over the 25-year horizon."

In 2017, at a Region of Halton planning and public works committee meeting Halton Region director of planning and chief planning official Ron Glenn said, "The timing for the Milton two-way, all-day GO is in the post 25-year horizon. Interestingly enough, we had a discussion with Metrolinx this week about creating a focus group on getting a defined time for the two-way, all-day GO service in Milton as a priority." The information was shared with regional councillors at a February 8 planning and public works committee. On February 17, Metrolinx, through Halton MPP Indira Naidoo-Harris, challenged that assertion, saying, "Metrolinx is not aware of any sources that would lead to the information that was posted in the Milton Canadian Champion article. We are still working toward better service on the Milton GO line."

On August 10, 2021, the federal government indicated a willingness to partially fund an upgrade to the Milton line to handle all-day, two-way train service, but gave no timeline or a specific funding amount. Such an upgrade would cost about $1 billion. Before 2020, the line carried 30,000 passengers per day; however, freight traffic was a constraint against expansion of commuter service.

In February 2024, the Ontario government announced a plan to build dedicated tracks in the Milton corridor to enable two-way all-day service. The unfunded plan was estimated to cost more than $6 billion.

=== Extension to Waterloo Region ===
The Regional Municipality of Waterloo funded a study indicating that a $110 million extension of the Milton line could bring trains to Cambridge by 2012, with possible stations at Guelph Line in Campbellville, Highway 6 in Puslinch, and at Franklin Boulevard (a park and ride) and Water Street (downtown with transit connections) in Cambridge. However, the plans didn't come to fruition when an environmental assessment became a victim of budget cuts. GO Transit expects expansion of train service to Cambridge to happen in the 15 to 25 year time frame, after passenger capacity upgrades at Milton to relieve current train overcrowding.

== Station list ==
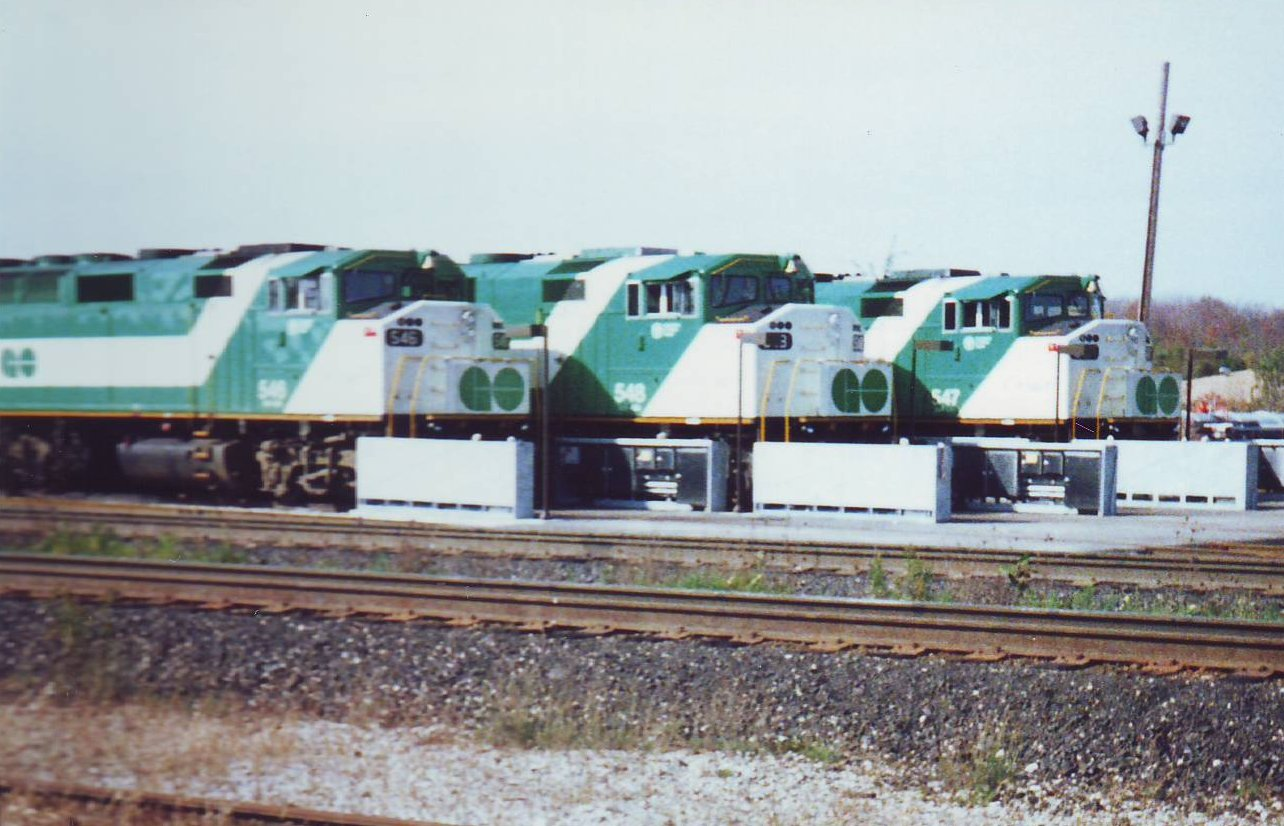
Milton line locomotives at rest in the Campbellville yard. (circa 1990)

Station	Municipality	Connections	Notes
Milton	Milton	Milton Transit	
Lisgar	Mississauga	MiWay; Brampton Transit; 511; Milton Transit	
Meadowvale	Mississauga	MiWay	
Streetsville	Mississauga	MiWay	
Erindale	Mississauga	MiWay	
Cooksville	Mississauga	MiWay	Future connection to Hurontario LRT
Dixie	Mississauga	MiWay	
Kipling	Toronto	TTC; MiWay	
Union	Toronto	TTC	

== Future ==
In 2015, Metrolinx released a list of potential sites for construction of new GO train stations. For the Milton line, the sites include:

- Bathurst/Spadina, between Bathurst Street and Spadina Avenue in Toronto
- Liberty Village, near King Street West
- Queen West, at the intersection of Queen Street West and Dufferin Street
- Dundas West, near the intersection of Dundas Street West and College Street
- The East Mall
- The West Mall
- Cawthra/Dundas, near the intersection of Cawthra Road and Dundas Street West
- Trafalgar, southeast of Highway 401 at Trafalgar Road

Selection of some station sites would preclude other sites. Only one of The East Mall and The West Mall sites would result in a potential future station, as would only one of the Liberty Village, Queen Street West-Dufferin, and Dundas West sites. The potential site for The East Mall or The West Mall is south of Dundas Street West near its intersection with Highway 427. After a business case, none of these stations were determined to have a positive economic impact and thus were removed from the Regional Express Rail plan.

== See also ==
- Canadian Pacific Kansas City
