= Erindale GO Station =

Railway station in Ontario, Canada

Erindale
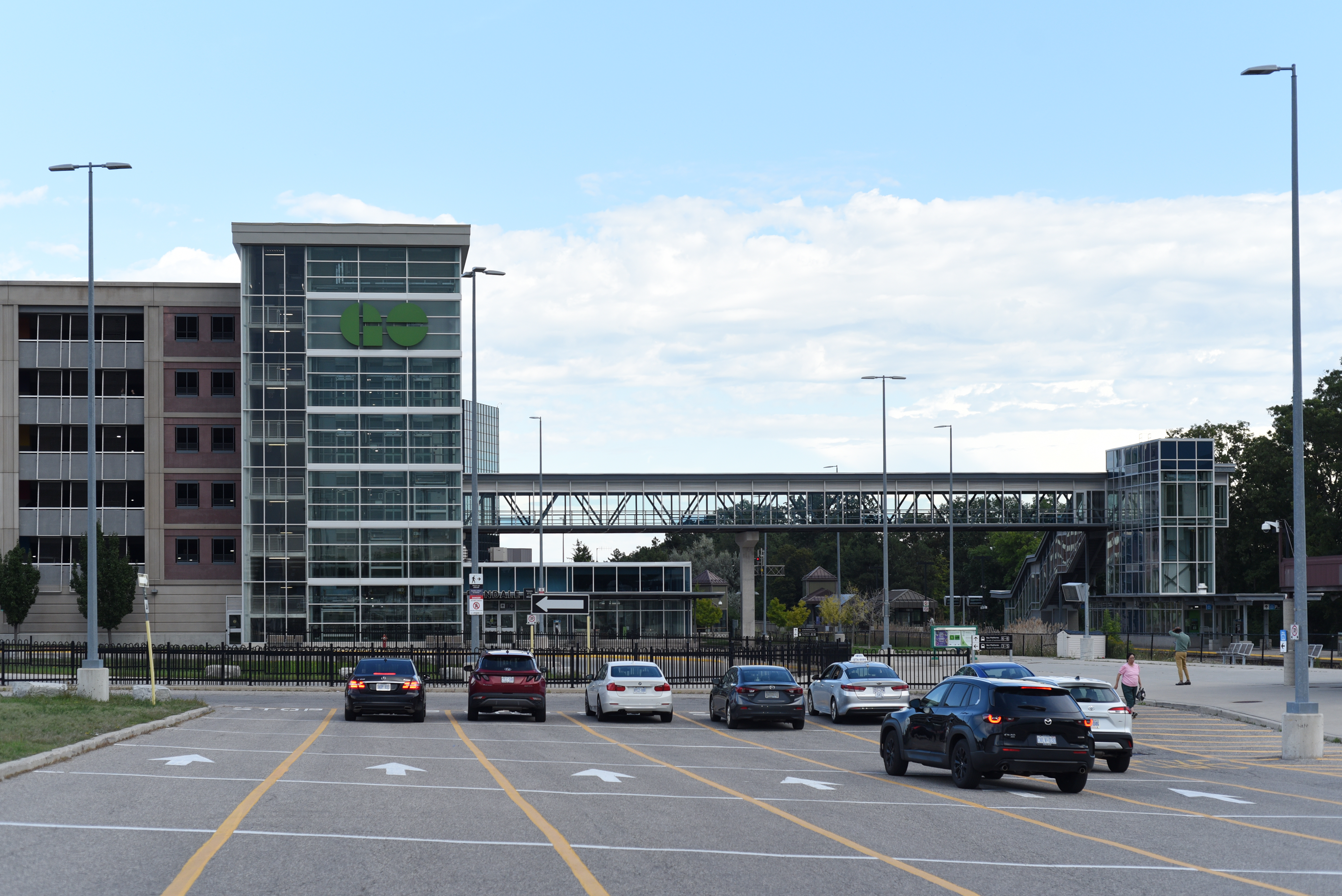
- The station in 2025

General information
- Location: 1320 Rathburn Road W. Mississauga, Ontario
- Coordinates: 43°34′01″N 79°40′00″W
- Owner: Metrolinx
- Platforms: 1 island platform
- Tracks: 3
- Bus routes: 21
- Connections: MiWay

Construction
- Structure type: Brick station building and elevators to platforms and multi-storey car park
- Parking: 770 spaces
- Accessible: Yes

Other information
- Station code: GO Transit: ER
- Fare zone: 40

History
- Opened: 27 October 1981

Services
Preceding station	GO Transit	Following station
Streetsville towards Milton	Milton	Cooksville towards Union
Former services at CP station
Preceding station	Canadian Pacific Railway	Following station
Streetsville toward Detroit	Detroit – Montreal	Cooksville toward Montreal Windsor
Streetsville toward Owen Sound	Owen Sound – Toronto	Cooksville toward Toronto
Location

Erindale GO Station is a GO Transit railway station on the Milton line in the Greater Toronto Area, Ontario, Canada. It is located at 1320 Rathburn Road West, just east of the Credit River in the Creditview neighbourhood of Mississauga, west of the Square One area.

Like many other GO stations, Erindale offers parking facilities, and has a station building which houses ticket sales and includes a waiting room.

Erindale acted as a terminus for the midday trains that GO Transit once operated on the Milton Line during the early to mid-1990s, but these trains no longer run.

Although ridership on the Milton line has grown beyond GO's expectations, it is not possible to run more trains, because the tracks are already busy with Canadian Pacific Kansas City freight traffic. In order to increase capacity, GO has extended the platforms to accommodate trains with twelve carriages rather than the previous ten.

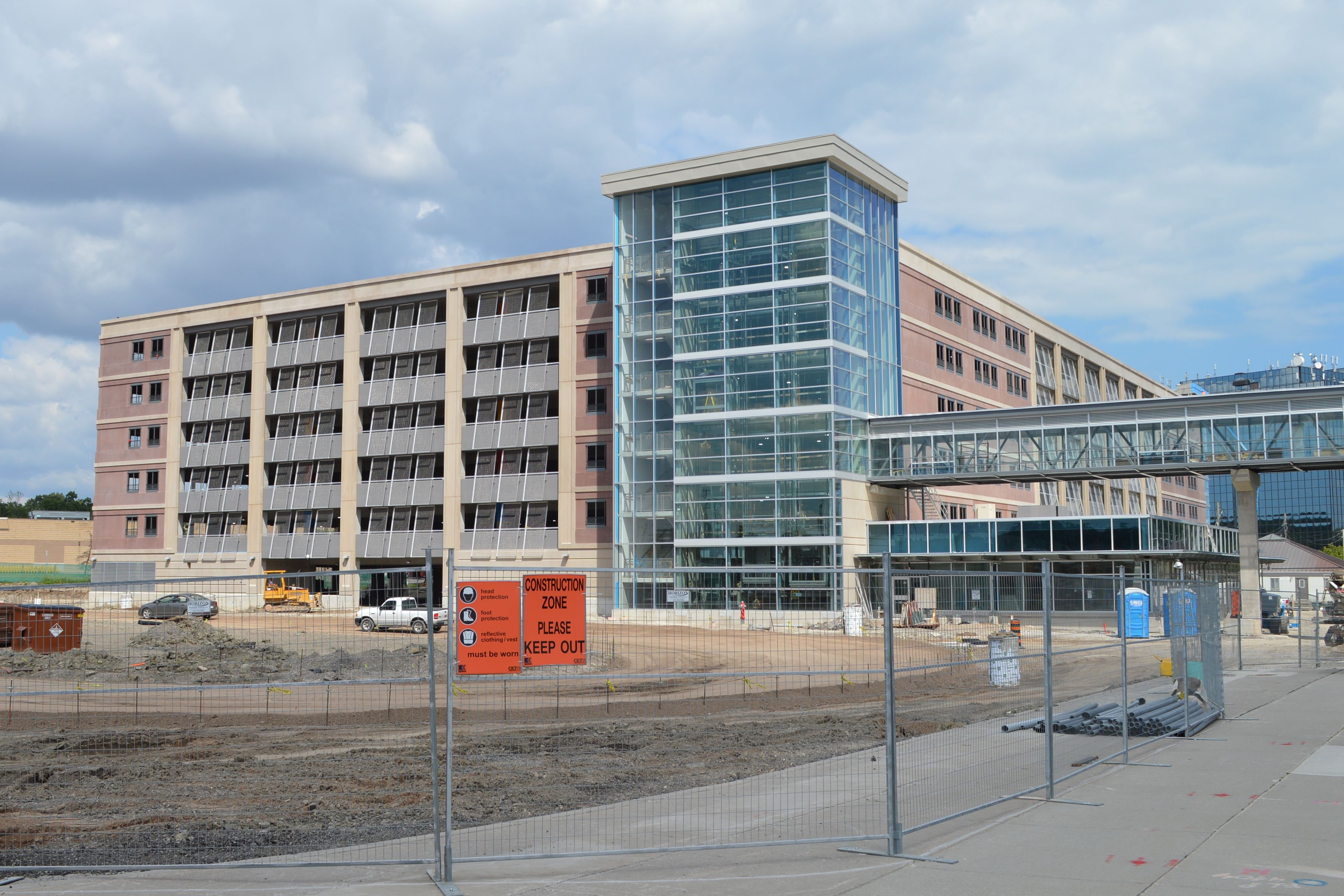
Multi-storey parking structure

Erindale was most recently upgraded and is now fully wheel chair accessible.

A construction project underwent a new multi-level covered parking structure with 1700 new spaces, new bus loop, dedicated pedestrian pathways, and covered pedestrian bridge to the station tracks. The project was completed in the spring of 2014.

== Connecting buses ==
MiWay

- 6 Credit Woodlands (on Burnhamthorpe Road)
- 9 Rathburn
- 26 Burnhamthorpe (on Burnhamthorpe Road)
- 38 Creditview (on Creditview Road)
- 126 Burnhamthorpe Express (on Burnhamthorpe Road)

GO Transit

- 21 Milton/Toronto

== Credit Valley Railway station ==
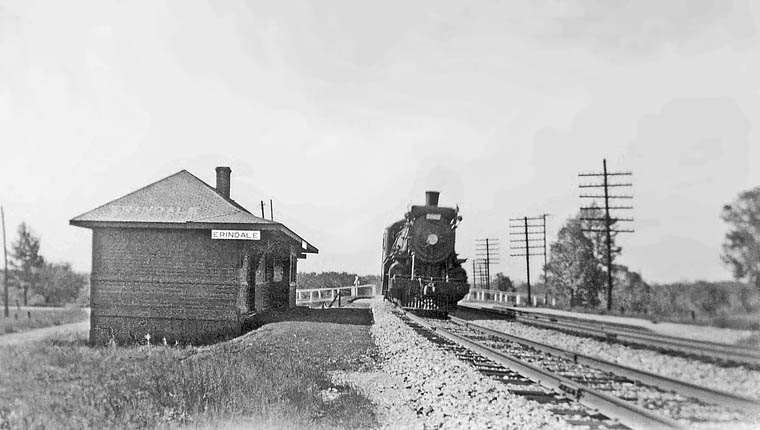
The CVR station in 1910

When the Credit Valley Railway opened in 1879, it built a station on Erindale Station Road, about a kilometre east of the current GO Transit facility. (The Credit Valley Railway was absorbed by the Canadian Pacific Railway in 1884.) With the decline of passenger traffic on the line, the old Erindale station was demolished in the 1950s.
