= Meadowvale GO Station =

Railway station in Mississauga, Ontario, Canada

Meadowvale
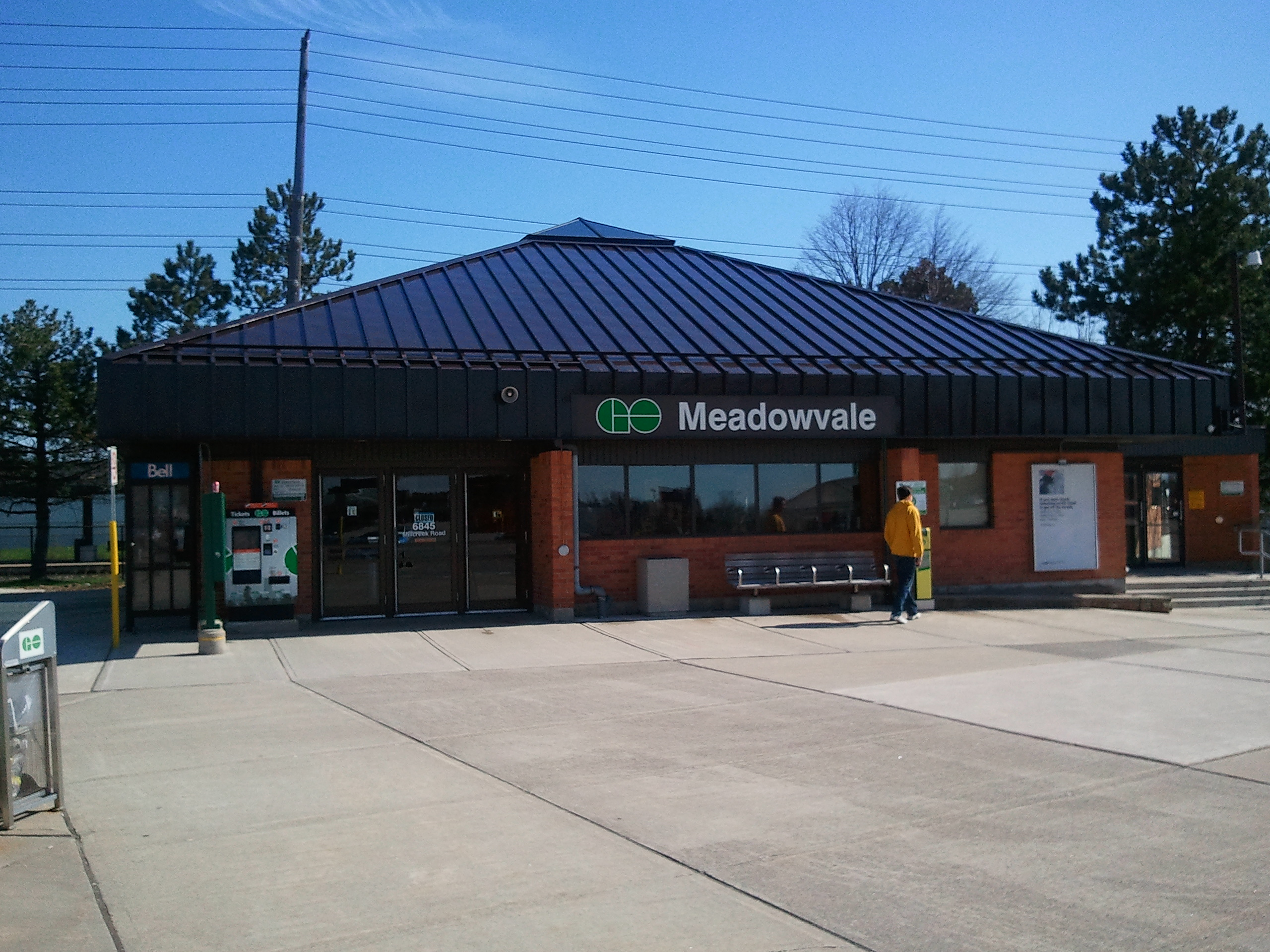
- Station building in 2011

General information
- Location: 6845 Millcreek Drive; Mississauga, Ontario; Canada
- Coordinates: 43°35′51″N 79°45′16″W
- Owner: Metrolinx
- Platforms: 1 side platform
- Tracks: 2
- Bus routes: 21 27 48
- Bus stands: 5
- Connections: MiWay

Construction
- Structure type: Brick station building and additional shelters on the platform
- Parking: 1,600 spaces
- Cycle facilities: Yes
- Accessible: Yes

Other information
- Station code: GO Transit: ME
- Fare zone: 22

History
- Opened: October 27, 1981; 45 years ago

Services
Preceding station	GO Transit	Following station
Lisgar towards Milton	Milton	Streetsville towards Union
Location

Meadowvale GO Station is a GO Transit railway station on the Milton line in the Greater Toronto Area, Ontario, Canada. It is located at 6845 Millcreek Drive near Derry Road West and Winston Churchill Blvd., in the City of Mississauga in the community of Meadowvale.

As with most GO stations, Meadowvale offers parking for commuters, and ticket sales with an attendant during the morning rush hour. In addition to the trains, Meadowvale is served by train-buses outside the rush hours and in the reverse commute direction, by the Milton–Yorkdale–York Mills GO Bus route, by the Highway 407 express buses to Highway 407 Bus Terminal, and by Mississauga Transit buses.

Although ridership on the Milton line has grown beyond GO's expectations, the tracks are already busy with Canadian Pacific Kansas City freight traffic. While it is possible to increase the number of trains, Canadian Pacific Railway will not allow it unless a third GO Transit dedicated right of way track is built. In order to increase capacity, GO Transit has extended the rail platform to accommodate trains with twelve carriages rather than the current ten. As a temporary solution, extensive train-bus services help alleviate congestion.

== Connecting MiWay buses ==
- 44 Mississauga Road
- 90 Terragar–Copenhagen

== Other Meadowvale train stations ==
- Credit Valley Railway/CPR Meadowvale Station near Derry Road and Creditview Road c 1879 and removed around 1976 and wood reused for garage at 1101 Old Derry Road.
- Toronto Suburban Railway Meadowvale Stop 47 - c 1917 the passenger shed was relocated and preserved at Halton County Radial Railway Museum in Milton, Ontario in 1972.
