= Cooksville GO Station =

Transit station in Cooksville, Mississauga, Canada

Cooksville
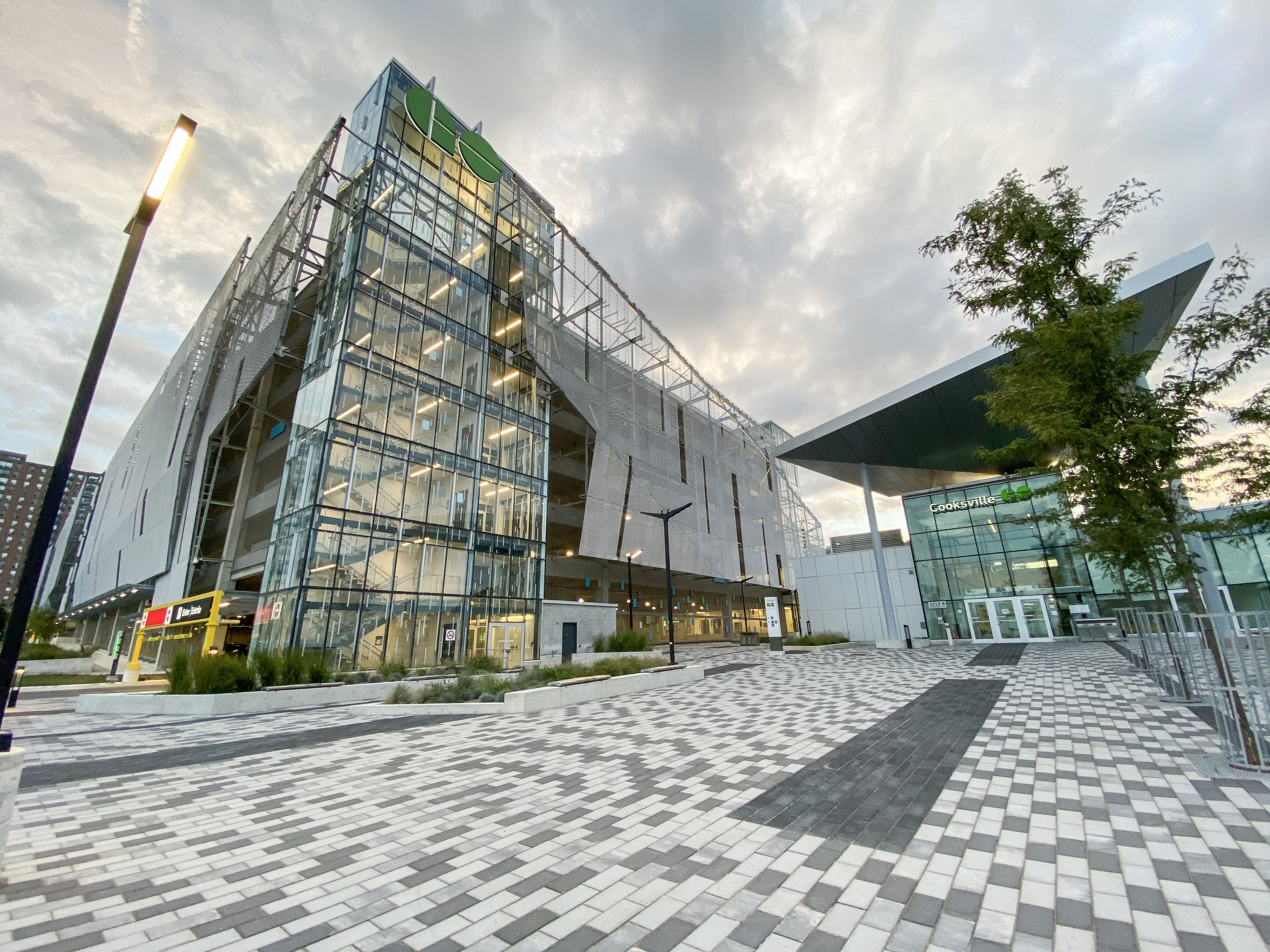
- New station building completed in 2020

General information
- Location: 3210 Hurontario Street; Mississauga, Ontario; Canada
- Coordinates: 43°34′59″N 79°37′25″W
- Owner: Metrolinx
- Platforms: 1 side platform
- Tracks: 2
- Bus routes: 21
- Connections: MiWay

Construction
- Structure type: Brick station building
- Parking: 1,458 spaces
- Cycle facilities: Yes
- Accessible: Yes

Other information
- Station code: GO Transit: CO
- Fare zone: 11

History
- Opened: October 27, 1981; 45 years ago (GO Transit); TBD (Hurontario LRT)
- Rebuilt: 2018–2020

Services
Preceding station	GO Transit	Following station
Erindale towards Milton	Milton	Dixie towards Union

Future services
Preceding station	Metrolinx	Following station
Fairview toward Brampton Gateway	Hurontario LRT	Dundas toward Port Credit
Former services at CP station
Preceding station	Canadian Pacific Railway	Following station
Erindale toward Detroit	Detroit – Montreal	Dixie toward Montreal Windsor
Erindale toward Owen Sound	Owen Sound – Toronto	Dixie toward Toronto
Location

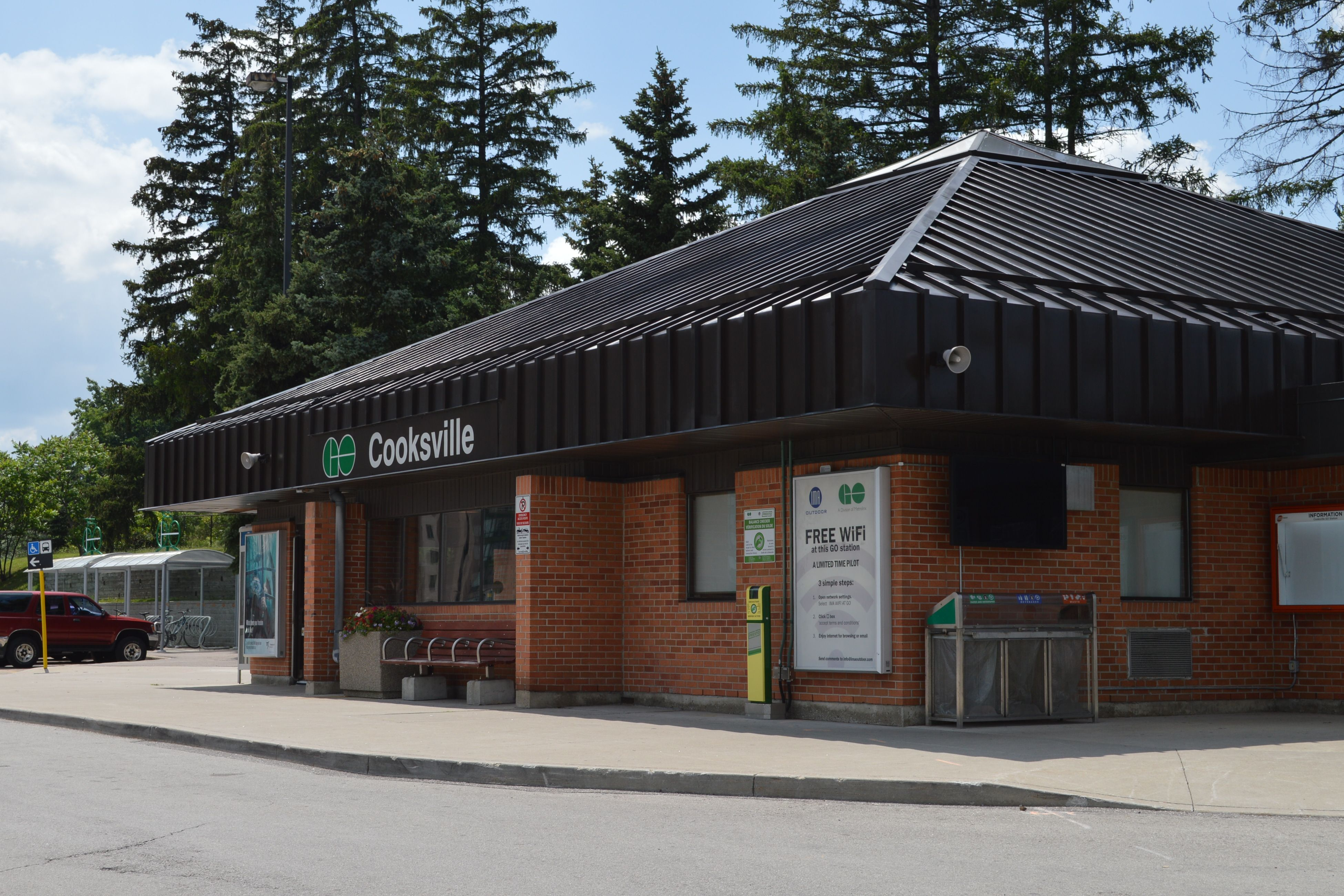
Original station building

Cooksville GO Station is a train and bus station serving GO Transit's Milton line, located in the community of Cooksville in Mississauga, Ontario, Canada. It is located at 3210 Hurontario Street, near Dundas and Hurontario Streets. The future Hurontario LRT will connect to this station.

== Description ==
Like most GO stations, Cooksville has parking for commuters and a station building with a ticket sales agent and a waiting room. It is located near several condominium complexes, which provide ridership on the Milton Line. The 1400-space parking lot allows access to those who live closer to Mississauga City Centre to use the station.

The GO Station is served by seven trains inbound to Union Station in the morning rush hour and seven trains outbound to Milton during the evening rush hour. There is also the Train-Bus during off-peak hours.

Despite growing ridership on the Milton line, GO cannot schedule additional trains because of the busy Canadian Pacific Kansas City freight services running on the same tracks. Trains were extended from ten to twelve carriages in a phased roll-out between April 8, 2008 and May 2, 2008 in order to increase capacity, and congestion is alleviated somewhat by the extensive train-bus services outside of rush periods.

On October 13, 2008 the Canadian Pacific Spirit Train stopped at Cooksville GO station to promote the Vancouver 2010 Winter Olympics.

Repairs to the platforms and pedestrian tunnels began in October 2014 and was completed by the spring of 2015.

== Reconstruction ==
Demolition of the original Cooksville GO station building and portions of the parking lot began in 2018 in preparation for the construction of new station structures. The new station includes a multi-level parking structure, improved pedestrian access, and a connection to the under-construction Hurontario LRT. Construction was completed on November 10, 2020, at a cost of $128.4 million. The new station is characterized by a bold expanded mesh facade screen designed by NORR Architects. The design won awards from the International Parking and Mobility Institute for Design Excellence and was also a World Architecture Award Winner.

== Connecting buses ==
Buses such as MiWay and GO Transit enter the station with the following routes:

MiWay

- 2 Hurontario
- 4 North Service Road
- 28 Confederation
- 38 Creditview
- 53 Kennedy
- 103 Hurontario Express

GO Transit

- 21 Milton/Toronto

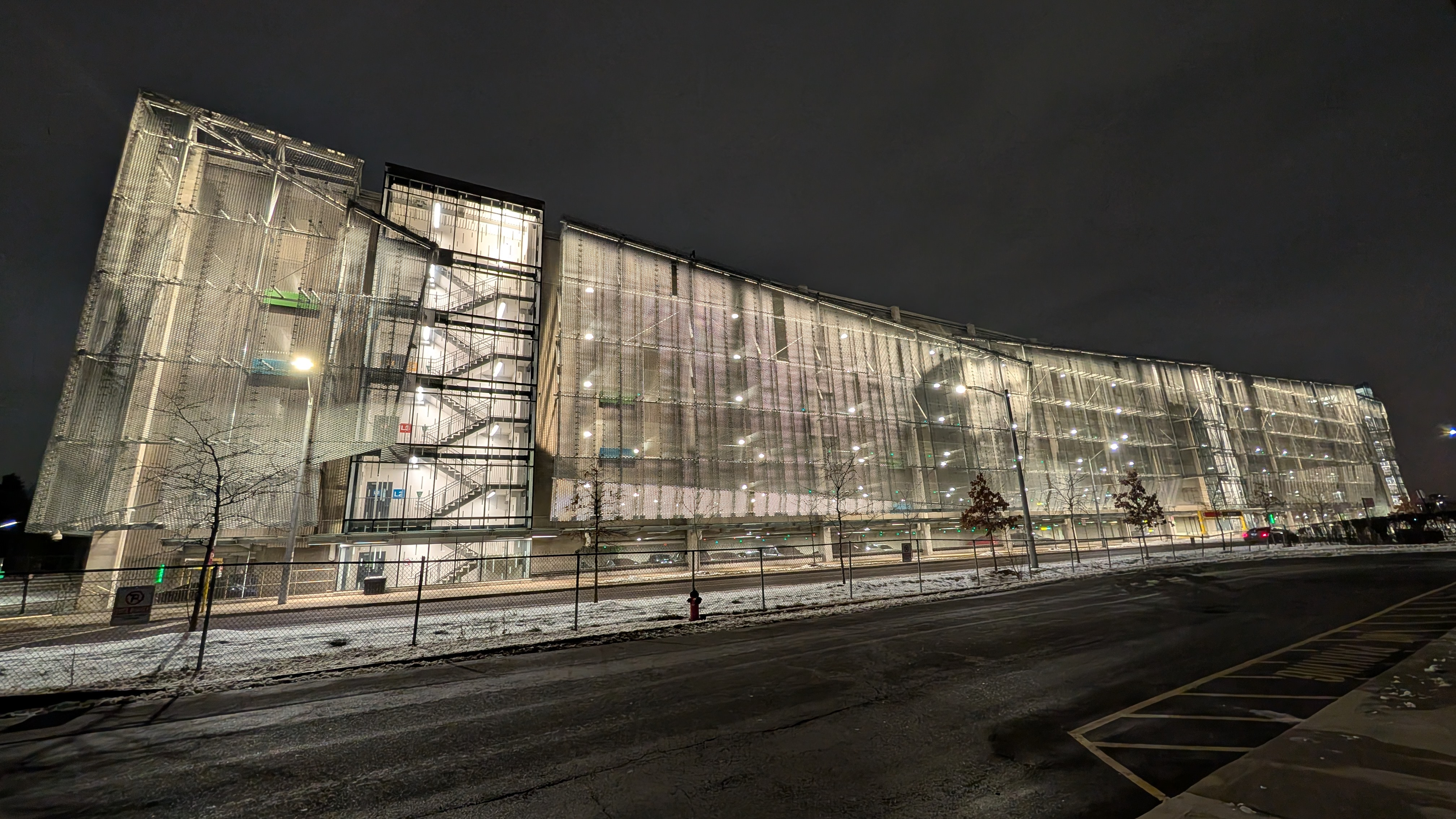
Cooksville GO station at night in 2024
