= Dixie GO Station =

Railway station in Mississauga, Ontario, Canada

Dixie
- Station building in 2025

General information
- Location: 2445 Dixie Road; Mississauga, Ontario; Canada
- Coordinates: 43°36′28″N 79°34′40″W
- Owner: Metrolinx
- Platforms: 1 side platform
- Tracks: 2
- Connections: MiWay

Construction
- Structure type: Brick station building
- Parking: 685 spaces
- Cycle facilities: Yes
- Accessible: Yes

Other information
- Station code: GO Transit: DI
- Fare zone: 11

History
- Opened: 27 October 1981

Services
Preceding station	GO Transit	Following station
Cooksville towards Milton	Milton	Kipling towards Union
Former services at CP station
Preceding station	Canadian Pacific Railway	Following station
Cooksville toward Detroit	Detroit – Montreal	Summerville toward Montreal Windsor
Cooksville toward Owen Sound	Owen Sound – Toronto	Summerville toward Toronto
Location

Dixie GO Station is a GO Transit railway station on the Milton line in the Dixie neighbourhood of Mississauga, Ontario, Canada. It is located at 2445 Dixie Road, just south of Dundas Street East.

Like most GO stations, Dixie offers parking facilities for commuters, and allows for wheelchair-accessible train services through a raised mini-platform giving access to the 5th carriage from the locomotive; it is one of the only three stations on the Milton Line (excluding Union Station) that offer the mini-platform. The station building houses a ticket sales agent and a waiting room.

Although ridership is growing on the Milton line including at Dixie, GO cannot increase its services here at present because the line is shared with busy Canadian Pacific Kansas City freight trains.

In order to increase capacity on the Milton line, GO plan to extend Dixie's platform to accommodate twelve-carriage trains once more powerful locomotives capable of pulling such trains have entered service in 2008.

== Connecting transit ==
Three MiWay routes serve the station, including Routes 31 Ogden and 51 Tomken that enter the station, and Route 5 Dixie that passes outside the station entrance.
