= Milton GO Station =

Railway station in Ontario, Canada

Milton
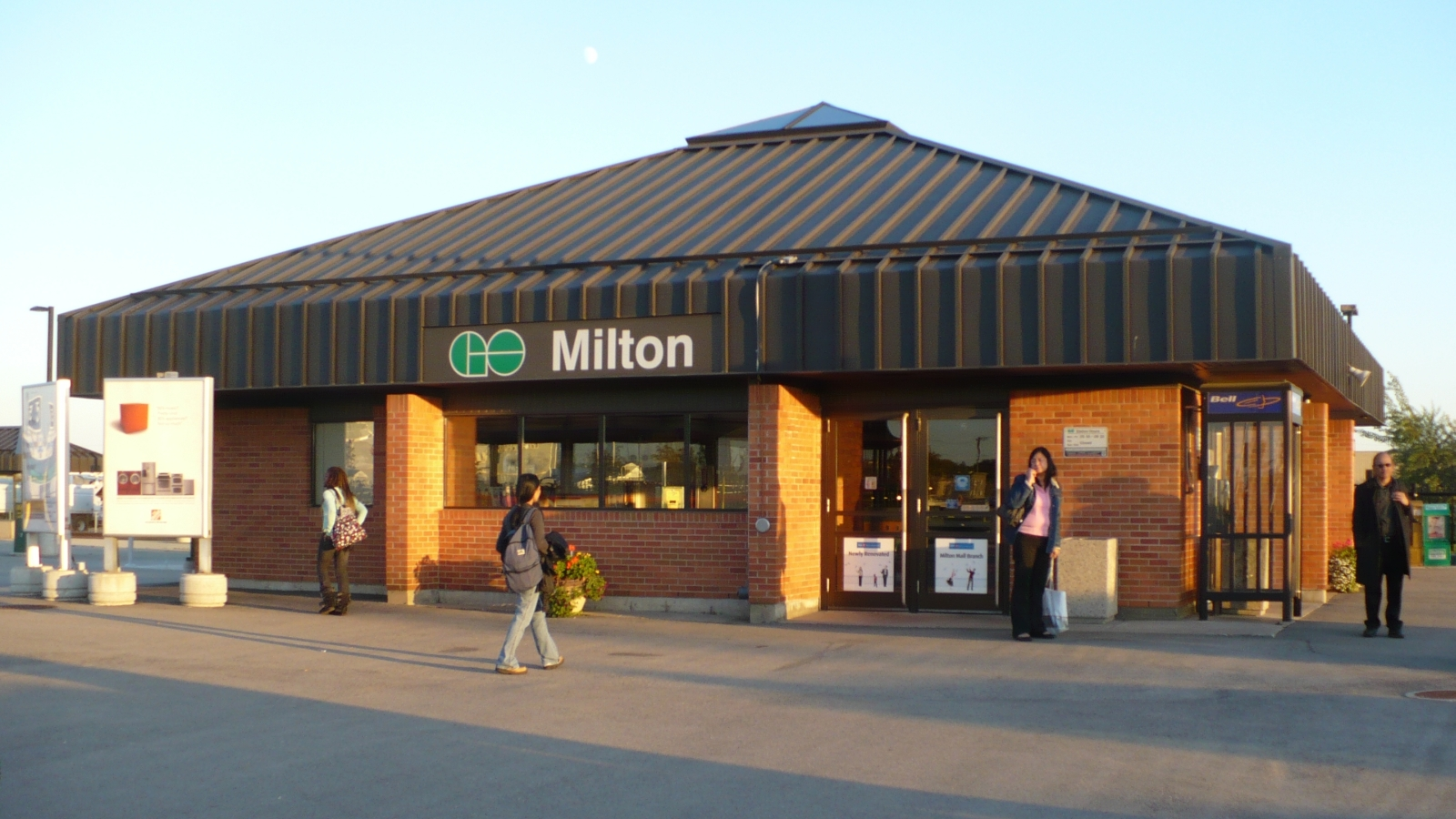
- Station building in 2008

General information
- Location: 780 Main Street East; Milton, Ontario; Canada
- Coordinates: 43°31′25″N 79°52′02″W
- Owner: Metrolinx
- Platforms: 1 side platform
- Tracks: 3
- Bus routes: 21 22 27
- Bus stands: 7
- Connections: Milton Transit

Construction
- Structure type: Brick station building
- Parking: 1,082 spaces
- Cycle facilities: Yes
- Accessible: Yes

Other information
- Station code: GO Transit: ML
- Fare zone: 24

History
- Opened: October 25, 1981; 45 years ago

Services
Preceding station	GO Transit	Following station
Terminus	Milton	Lisgar towards Union
Former services at CP station
Preceding station	Canadian Pacific Railway	Following station
Christie toward Detroit	Detroit – Montreal	Hornby toward Montreal Windsor
Location
- Milton Go Station in Milton, Ontario.

Milton GO Station is the western terminus of GO Transit's Milton line in the Greater Toronto Area, Ontario, Canada. It is located at 780 Main Street East in the Town of Milton, near Main Street and Ontario Street.

== Description ==
Milton GO Station offers parking for commuters, a station building housing ticket sales and a waiting room (open from 5:45 AM to 9:00 AM on weekdays), and a bus loop serving GO and Milton Transit buses. Located near Highway 401, it is placed to be accessible to residents of Cambridge, Kitchener, and Waterloo commuting to Toronto, with user having options such as shuttle buses and a park and ride.

A new layover facility (overnight service and storage yard) was built in 2006, and opened at the beginning of 2007 with capacity to store eight 12 car trains. Currently, seven 12 car trains are operated, with an eighth train planned to ease congestion in June 2012. This facility replaced one located 8 miles west at Guelph Junction in Campbellville, which could not be expanded beyond its five 10 car tracks.

== History ==
The initial Go Station site layout plans, alongside the proposed Toronto/Milton commuter rail service, was up for public review in 1980, with an open house session to review the service on August 5, 1980, in Meadowvale.

Milton Go Station had its inauguration day on October 25, 1981, and the inaugural run offered a free ride to Union Station. With service effective Monday on October 26, 1981, there were a reported 272 Milton residents using the train line, with the following day increasing to 303 Milton residents, all using the initial three departure times across six stops to Union Station.

== Connecting buses ==
Milton Transit

All of Milton Transit's regular routes start and end at Milton GO Station except for route 1 between Milton GO Station and Conestoga, and 21 between Milton and Lisgar GO stations

- 1 High Point
- 2 Main (East & West)
- 3 Trudeau
- 4 Thompson / Clark
- 5 Yates
- 6 Scott
- 7 Harrison
- 8 Willmott
- 9A/9B Ontario South
- 21 Steeles
- 52 School Extra
- 53 School Extra
- 54 School Extra

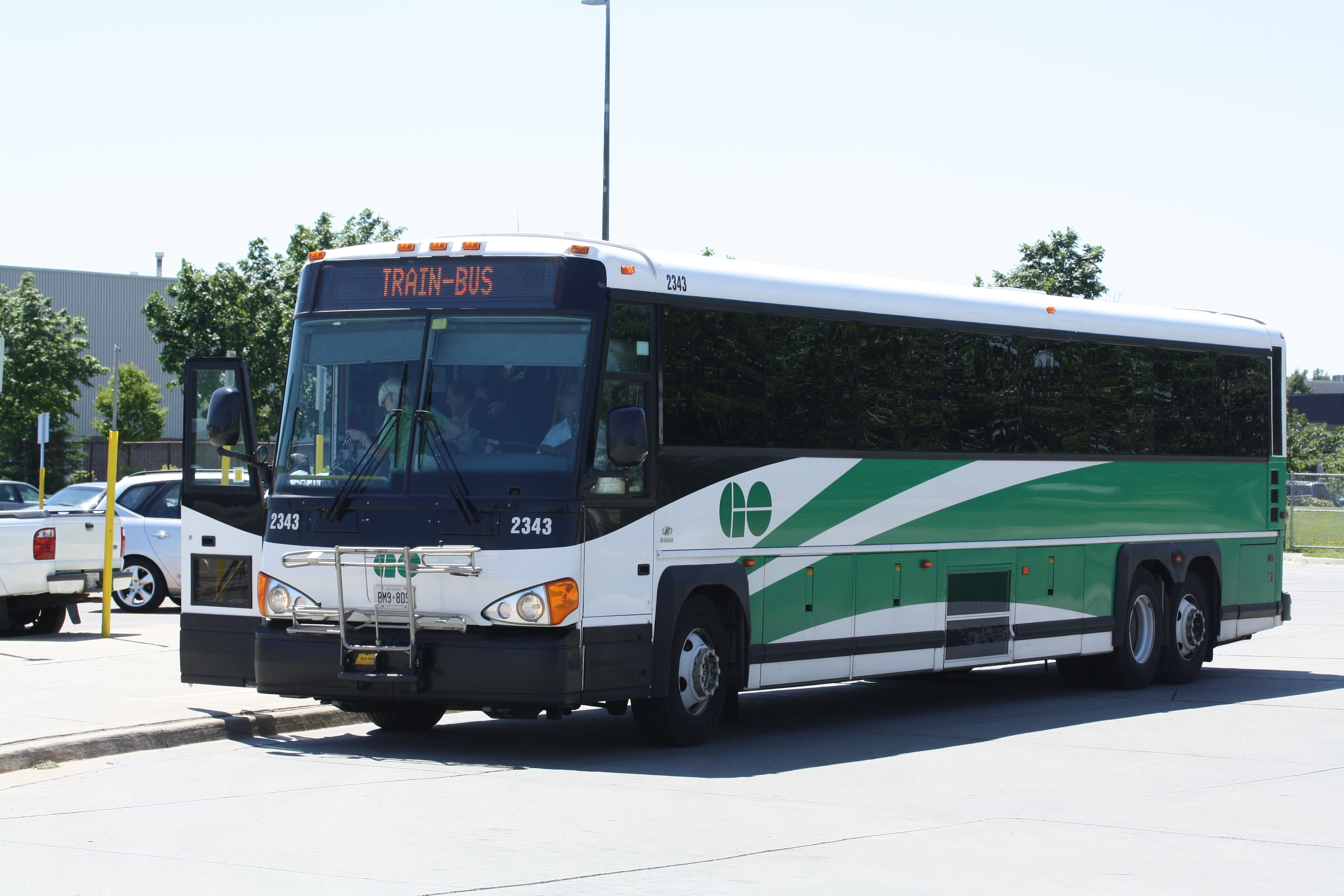
GO Bus at Milton GO Station.

GO Transit

- 21 Milton
- 21A Milton
- 21F Milton
- 22 Milton / Oakville
- 27A Milton / North York
- 27F Milton / North York
