= Windsor Drive (disambiguation) =

Windsor Drive is an American indie rock band.

Windsor Drive may also refer to:

- Windsor Drive (film), a 2015 American film
- Windsor Drive, in Chelsfield, London, England, UK
- Windsor Drive, in Lambs Lane, Lawshall, Suffolk, England, UK
- Windsor Drive, a portion of Virginia State Route 206, US

== See also ==
- Royal Windsor Drive, Mississauga, Ontario, Canada
- Windsor Way (Vancouver), British Columbia, Canada
- Windsor Avenue Congregational Church, Main Street, Hartford, Connecticut, US
- Windsor Road (disambiguation)
- Windsor (disambiguation)
