= Windsor Road (disambiguation) =

Windsor Road is a major road in Sydney, New South Wales, Australia.

Windsor Road may also refer to:

- Windsor Road, Nova Scotia, Canada; a district of in the Municipality of the District of Chester
- Windsor Road Historic District, Newton, Massachusetts, US
- Windsor Road railway station, Southport, Lancashire, England, UK
- Windsor Road, a portion of County Route 641 (Mercer County, New Jersey), US

== See also ==
- List of roads in Windsor, Ontario, Canada
- New Windsor Road, a portion of Maryland Route 31
- Old Windsor Road, in Sydney, Australia
  - Windsor Road cycleway, a cycleway along the road
- Windsor Way (Vancouver), a bike path in British Columbia, Canada
- Windsor Avenue Congregational Church, Main Street, Hartford, Connecticut, USA
- Windsor Mill Road, Baltimore, Maryland, USA
- Windsor Bridge
- Windsor Drive (disambiguation)
- Windsor (disambiguation)
