= List of roads in Mississauga =

The following is a list of non-numbered and numbered (Peel Regional Roads) in Mississauga, Ontario.

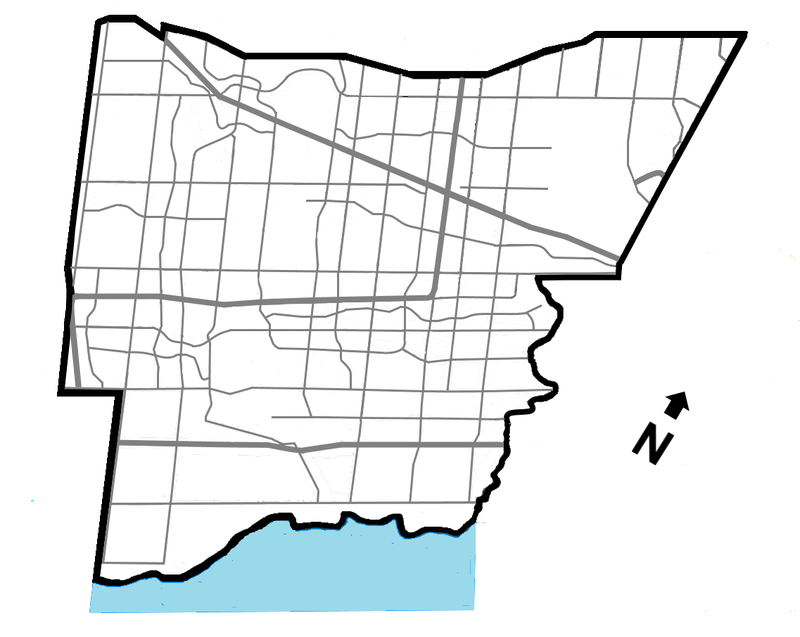
Map showing Mississauga's major streets and highways

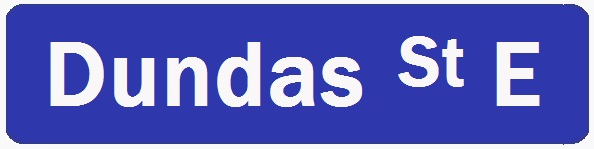
Graphic of a Mississauga traffic light-mounted street sign

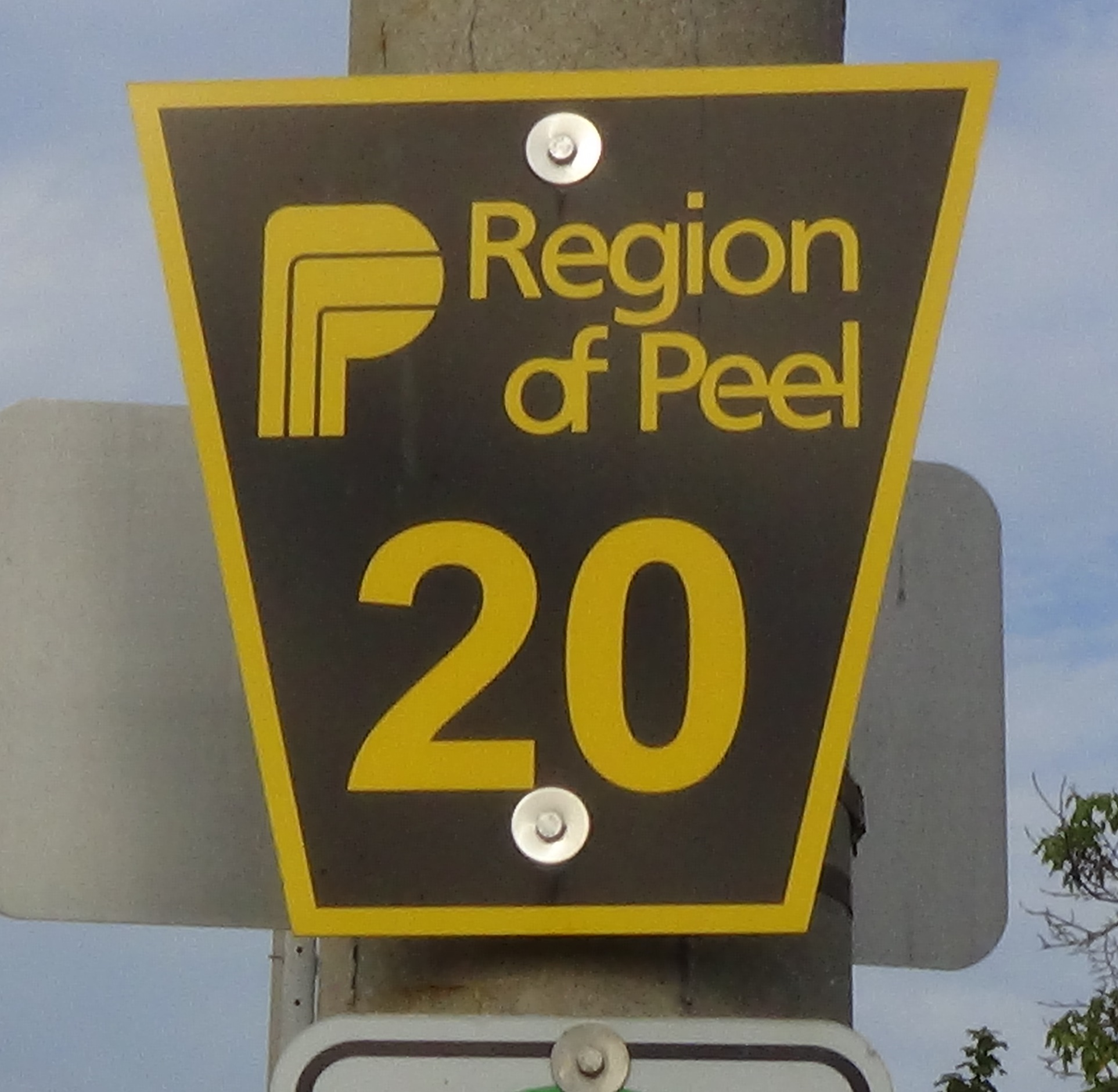
Some arterial roads in Mississauga are maintained by Peel Region and are numbered: A Peel Regional Road 20 sign on Queensway

== History and layout ==
Most major roads in Mississauga are concession roads laid out in the early 19th Century, when much of the city was known as Toronto Township. East-west roads were historically called concessions, while north–south roads were called lines (with two and parts of a third still bearing that designation). East-west roads were surveyed from Dundas Street and (with the exception of Lakeshore Road) divided by Hurontario Street as East or West (e.g. Dundas Street East and Dundas Street West), while north–south roads were surveyed from Hurontario, although these streets are not divided into North or South sections.

Mississauga is unusual in that there were two different surveys used; with Lower Base Line (present Eglinton Avenue), being the dividing line between them. For the north–south roads, the southern survey used the square 1,000-Acre Sectional System spacing of about 1 1/4 miles (2.0 km), while those in the northern survey were spaced at 1 7/8 miles (3.0 km) for concessions and 5/6 mile (1.3 km) for lines. This meant that the roads in the two surveys did not line up, except at 2 1/2 miles (4.0 km) intervals on either side of Hurontario (although due to the relatively short distance across the city and the presence of the deep Credit River valley in the south, only present Winston Churchill Boulevard and Dixie Road actually fit this pattern). Another result of the two surveys was that there were an unequal number of lines across the township. To rectify this, short roads or extensions from the north were added to the (older) southern survey (e.g. present Tomken Road) to match up the number of roads. For example, this adjustment allowed the precursor to Dixie Road to be numbered Third Line East for its full length.

== East–west roads ==
=== Lakeshore Road ===
Lakeshore Road
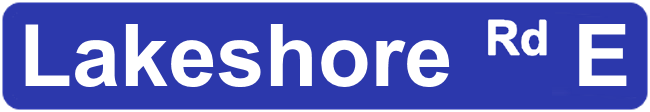
- Location: Winston Churchill Blvd. - Etobicoke Creek (continues east into Toronto as Lake Shore Blvd; west into Oakville)

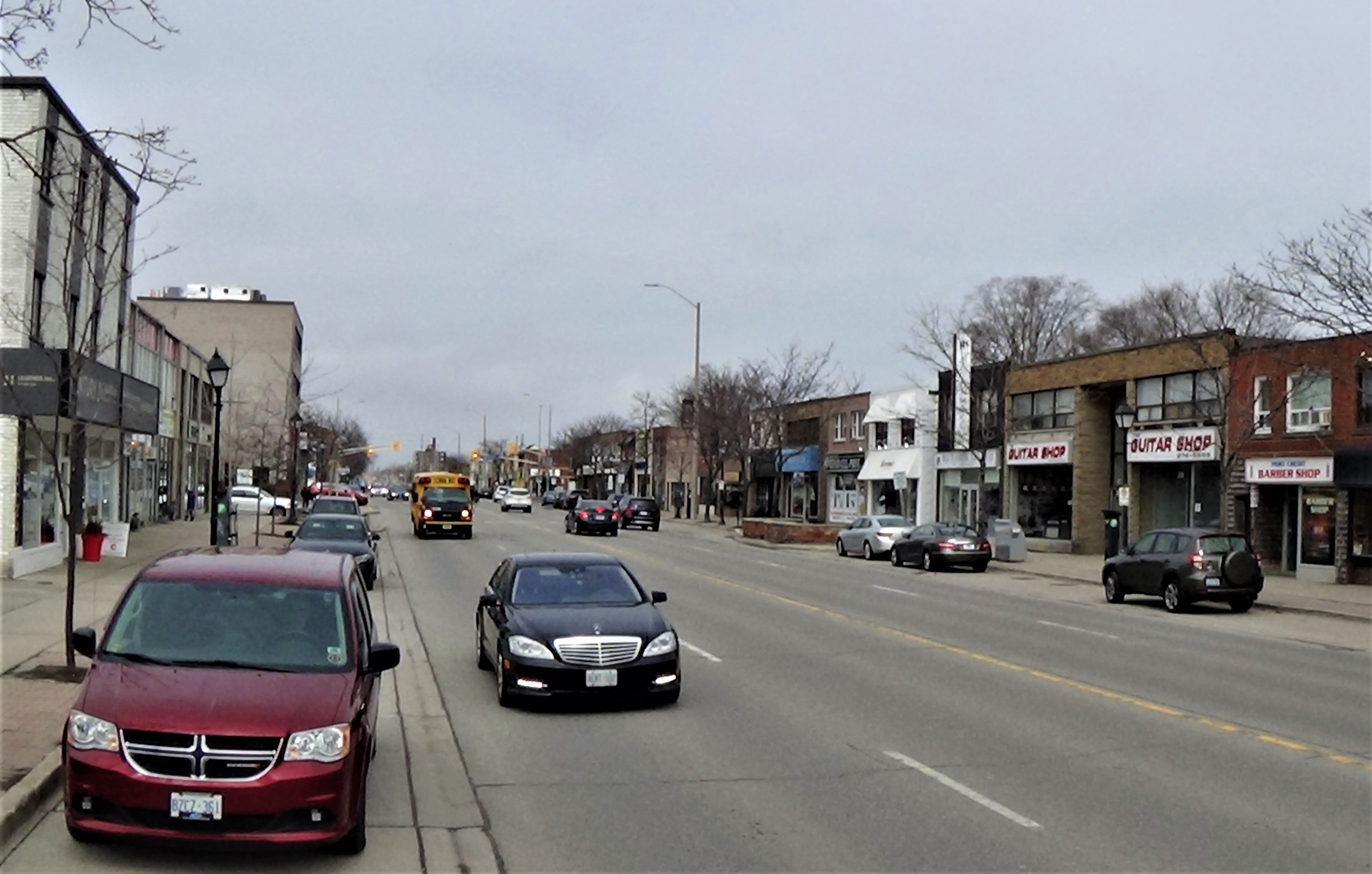
Lakeshore Rd. in Port Credit

A part of the former Highway 2, Lakeshore Road is the most southerly major arterial road in Mississauga, and is a continuation of Lake Shore Boulevard in Toronto. Lakeshore jogs 2 km south at Southdown Road in order to remain close to the shoreline, and it continues west into Oakville, before ending in Burlington. Lakeshore is the only arterial road which crosses Hurontario Street but is not divided into east and west segments by it, instead being split by the Credit River.

=== Royal Windsor Drive ===
Royal Windsor Drive
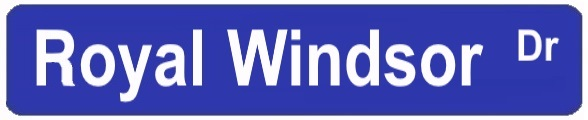
- Location: Winston Churchill Blvd. - Southdown Rd. (continues west into Oakville; east as the eastern leg of Lakeshore Rd.)

Royal Windsor Drive is the westerly continuation of Lakeshore Road's main (eastern) section. It was the concession road between Concession II SDS (South of Dundas Street) and Concession III SDS, which is the present western section of Lakeshore after it jogs south along Southdown Road.

=== Queensway ===
Queensway
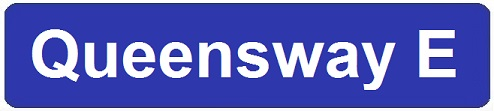
- Location: Glengarry Rd. - Etobicoke Creek (continues east into Toronto)

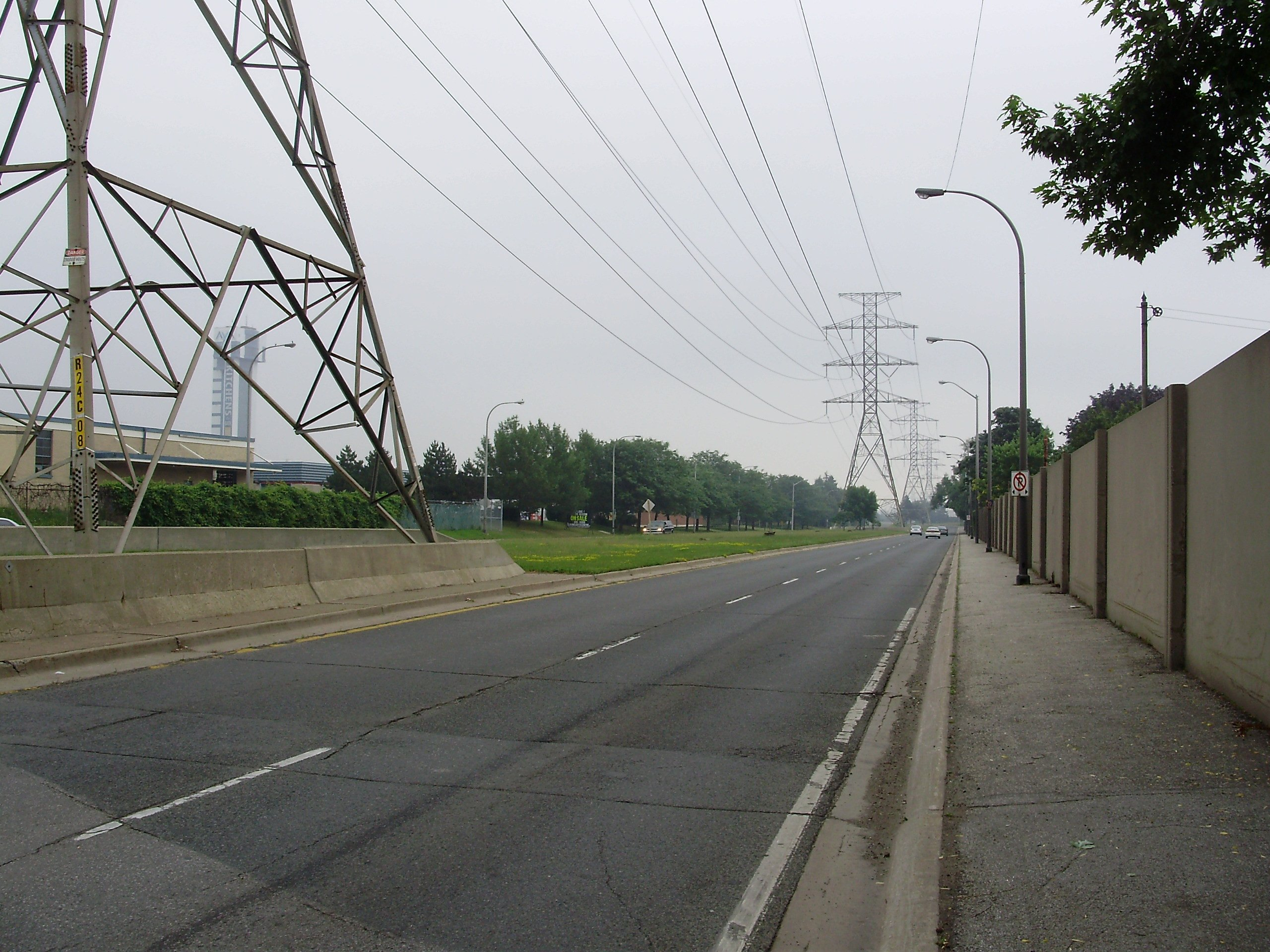
East of Dixie Road, Queensway runs with a hydro corridor in its median.

Queensway (often called The Queensway after its official name in Toronto) is designated as Peel Regional Road 20 east of Mavis Road. Once referred to as the Upper Middle Road as it was located north of The Middle Road (now part of the Queen Elizabeth Way). The road's name comes from Queen Street in Old Toronto, of which Queensway is a westerly continuation of.

=== Dundas Street ===
Dundas Street
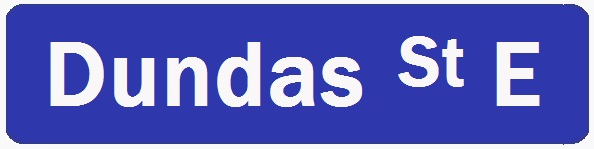
- Location: Ninth Line — Etobicoke Creek (continues east into Toronto; west into Oakville)

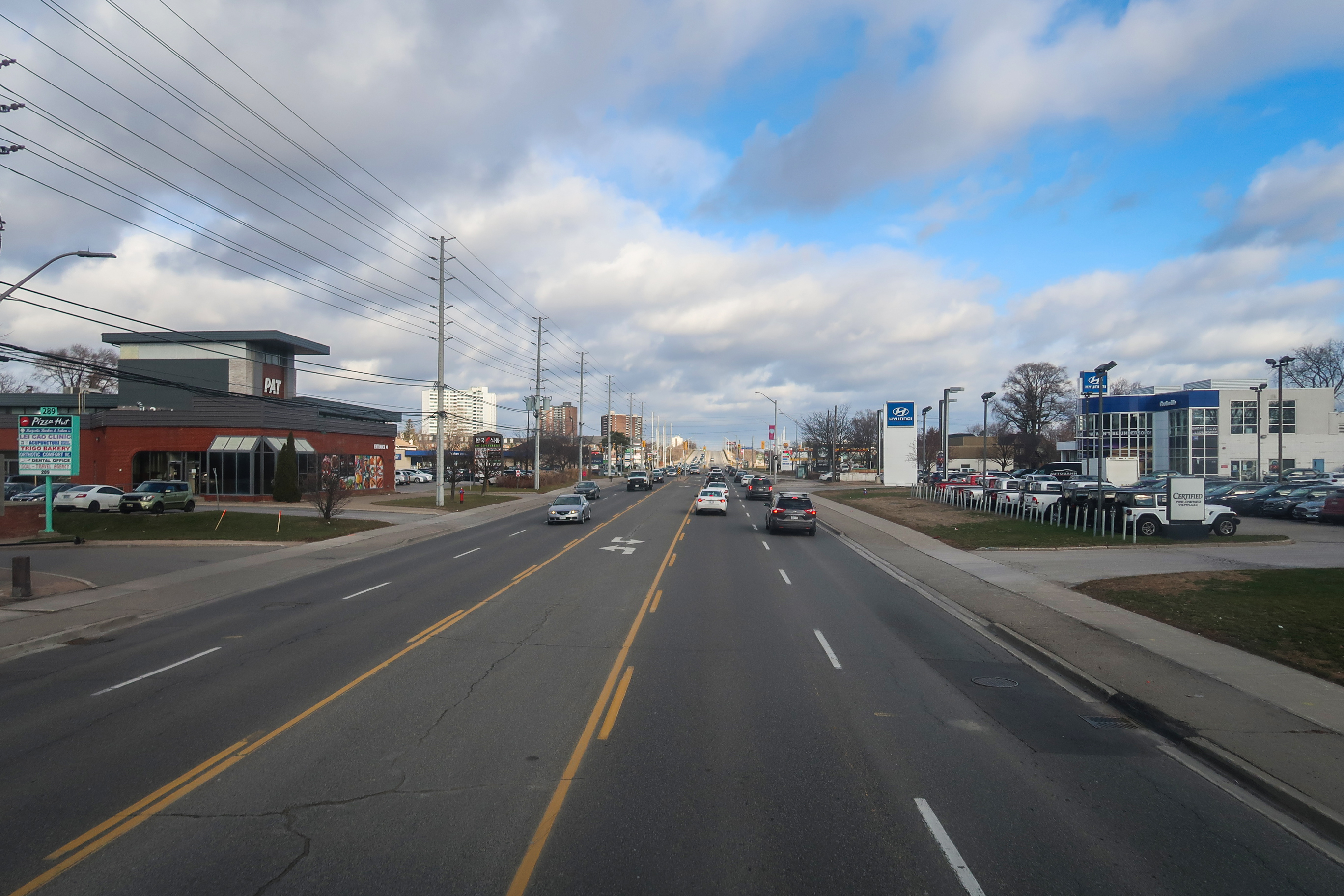
Dundas St. east of Cawthra Rd.

Dundas Street is a section of the former Highway 5, and was an important historical route running from Toronto to London. Dundas is traditionally considered Mississauga's main east–west street.

NORTH

=== Bloor Street ===
Bloor Street
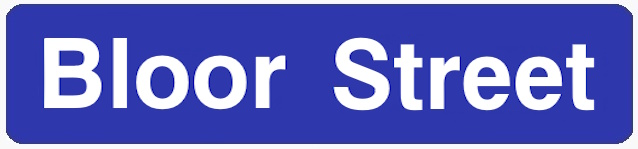
- Location: Central Pkwy — Etobicoke Creek (continues east into Toronto)

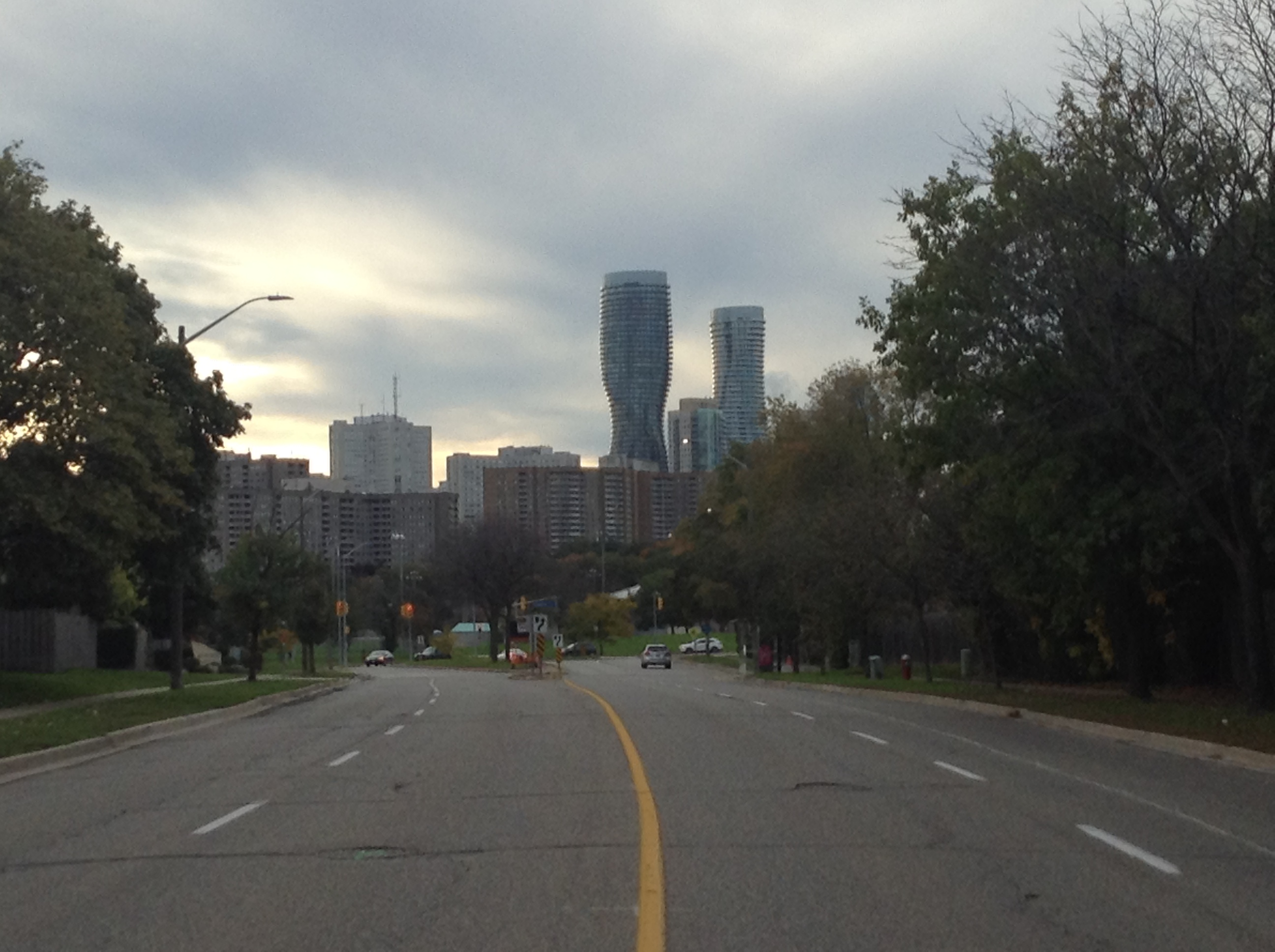
Looking towards the western terminus of Bloor with the Absolute World towers beyond

Bloor Street continues from Toronto and ends at Central Parkway, which turns from an east–west alignment (which effectively continues the street farther west) to a north–south alignment at Bloor. The street did not originally reach Mississauga, but was constructed through it (when it was still Toronto Township) beginning in the mid-1960s, although the street was not bridged over the Etobicoke Creek (the present Mississauga/Toronto boundary) until 1971.

=== Central Parkway ===
Central Parkway
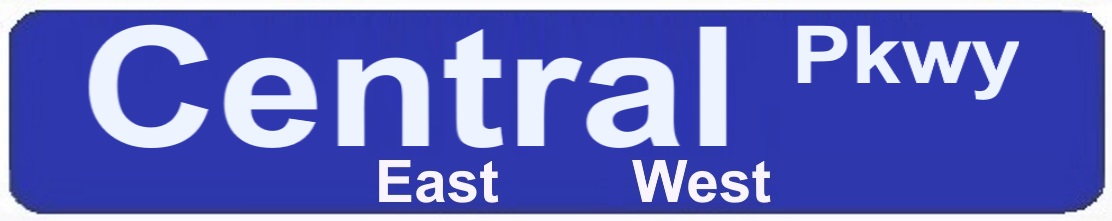
- Location: Burnhamthorpe Rd. - Eglinton Ave. via south-east-north loop (west leg continues north as Creditview Rd.; east leg continues north as Kennedy Rd.)

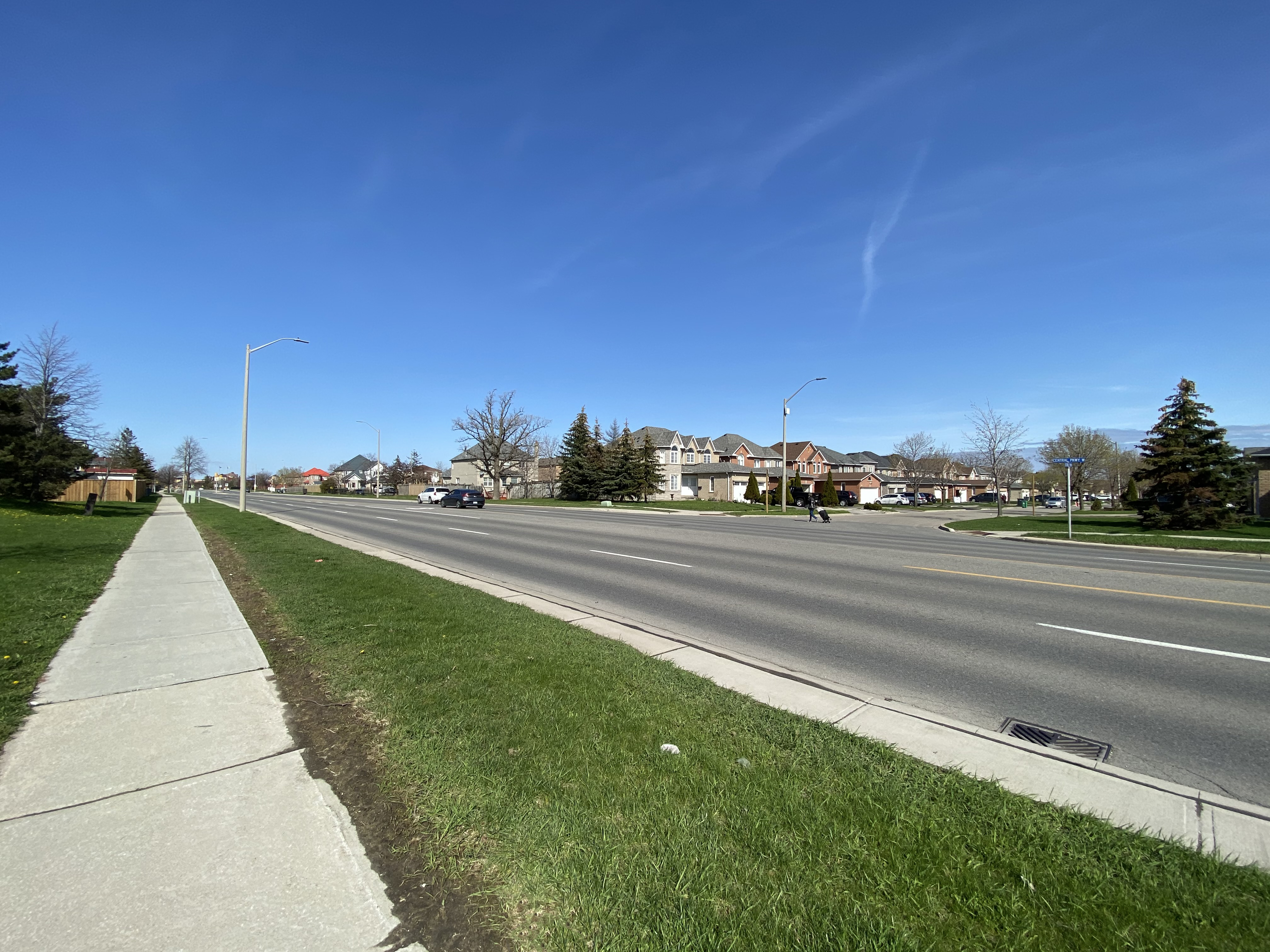
Central Parkway West

Central Parkway is a road with an unusual course; running south from Burnhamthorpe Road as a continuation of Creditview Road, then turns east along the baseline of Bloor St. west of its terminus, where it turns back north to Eglinton Avenue and becomes Kennedy Road, forming a U-shaped loop consisting of the three streets.

The Mississauga Transitway's Central Parkway Station is located on the road's east side, north of the intersection with Rathburn Rd and just south of where it passes underneath (but does not interchange with) Highway 403.

=== Burnhamthorpe Road ===
Burnhamthorpe Road
- Location: Ninth Line — Etobicoke Creek (continues east into Toronto; west into Oakville)

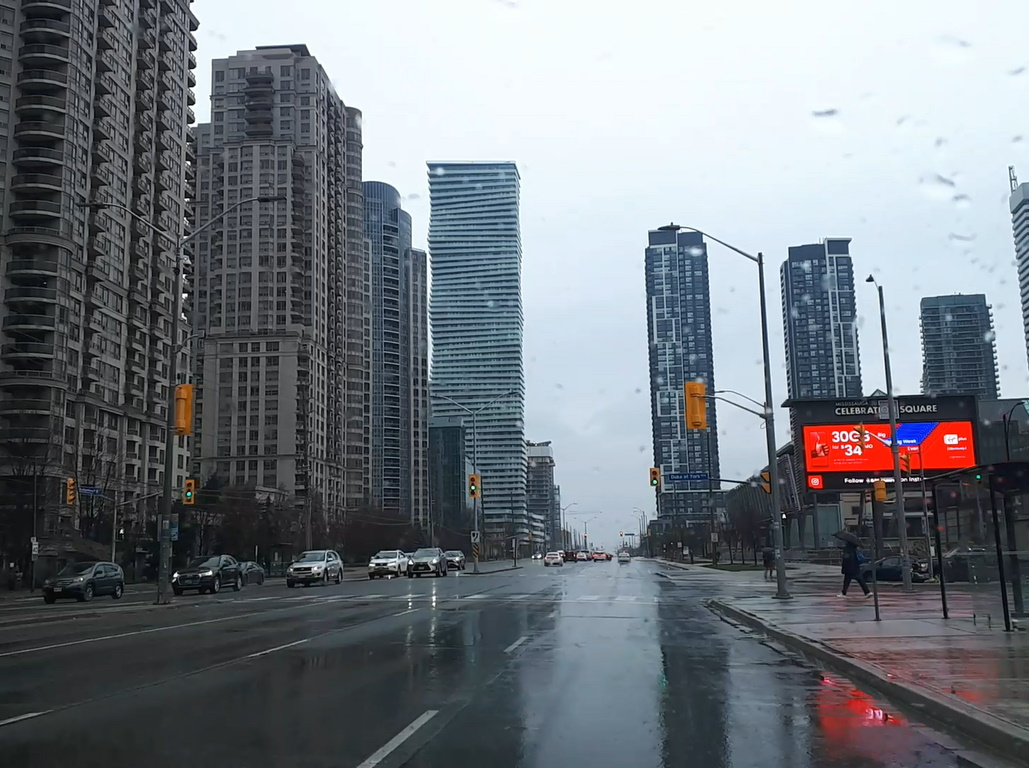
Burnhamthorpe Road in the City Centre

Burnhamthorpe Road runs across the city and continues into both Toronto and Oakville, passing through the Mississauga City Centre en route. An unusual aspect of Burnhamthorpe is that, unlike other thoroughfares originating in Toronto, the road is relatively short in that city and its primary section runs through Mississauga. The road is named after the former hamlet at the intersection of Dixie Road, which was in turn named by settler John Abelson after his hometown of Burnham Thorpe, England.

=== Rathburn Road ===
Rathburn Road
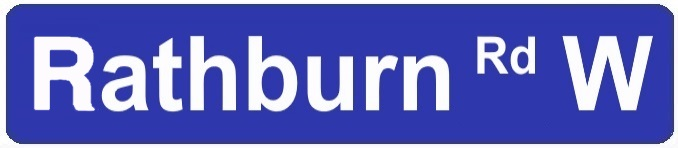
- Location: Creditview Rd — dead end at Etobicoke Creek (continues east into Toronto via Mill Road)

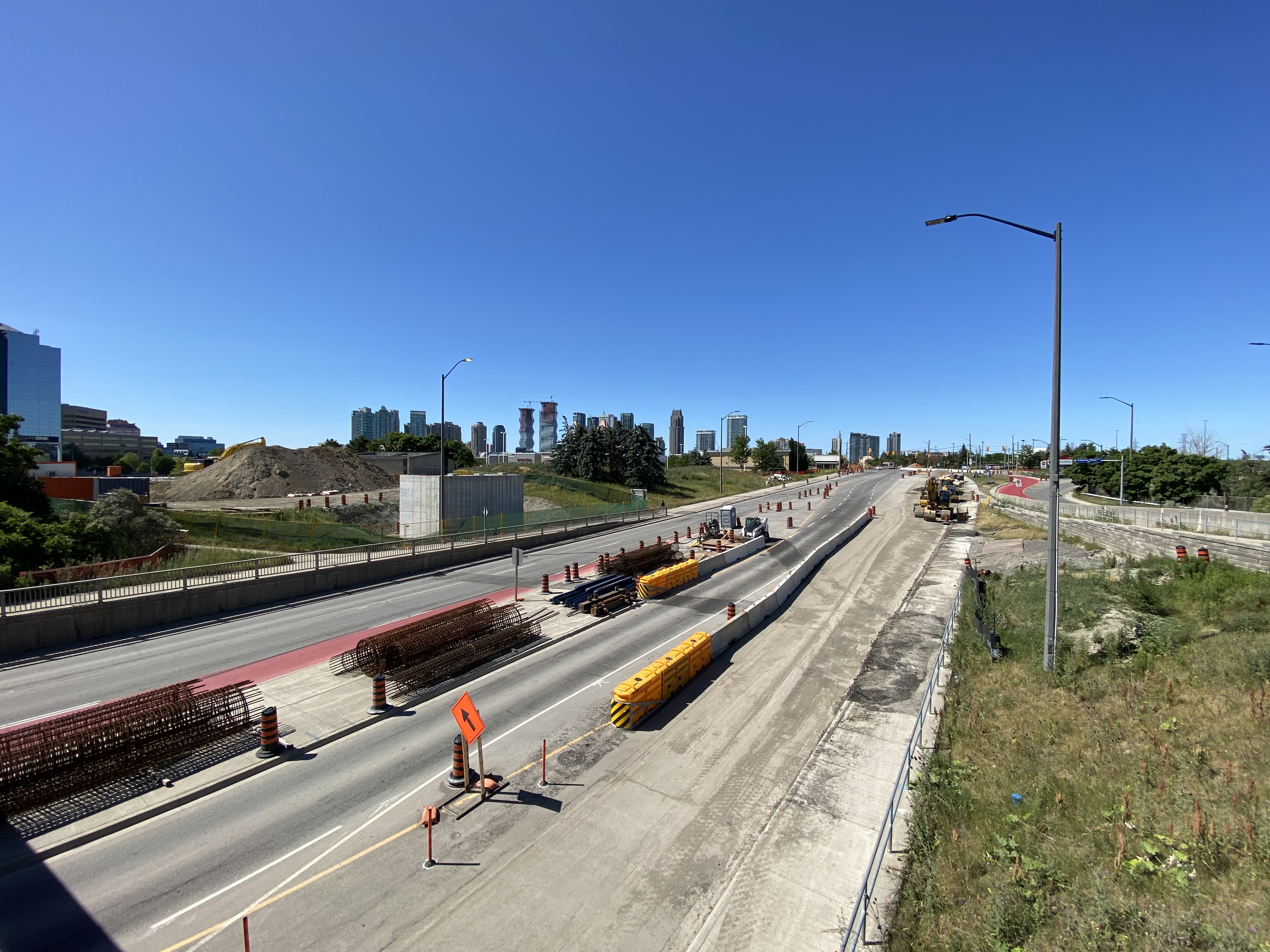
Rathburn Rd. looking west from the Hurontario St. overpass, with construction work for the Hurontario LRT in progress.

Rathburn Road runs from Creditview Road to east of Fieldgate Drive. Originally intended to be an extension of a separate, older section in Toronto. However, a proposed bridge over the Etobicoke Creek to connect the two sections was never constructed due to opposition by residents. Due to the dead end at the creek, the easternmost section is bypassed, with traffic being defaulted south to Burnhamthorpe Rd. via Ponytrail Drive. Rathburn passes by the City Centre Transit Terminal across from Station Gate Rd within the City Centre, next to Square One Shopping Centre.

=== Centre View Drive ===
Centre View Drive
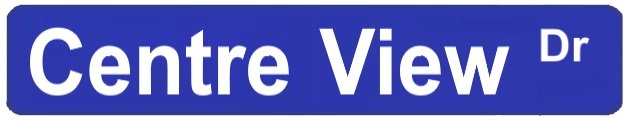
- Location: Mavis Rd/Highway 403 - Rathburn Rd. (continues south as City Centre Dr.)

Centre View Drive was constructed in the early 1990s to provide direct access between Highway 403 and the City Centre. It splits off the eastbound Mavis Road offramp and passes under it (westbound traffic uses Mavis itself to access the 403) then ducks beneath Confederation Parkway and runs parallel to the freeway until just west of Hurontario Street, where it turns south, crosses Rathburn Rd., and continues as City Centre Drive.

=== Eastgate Parkway ===
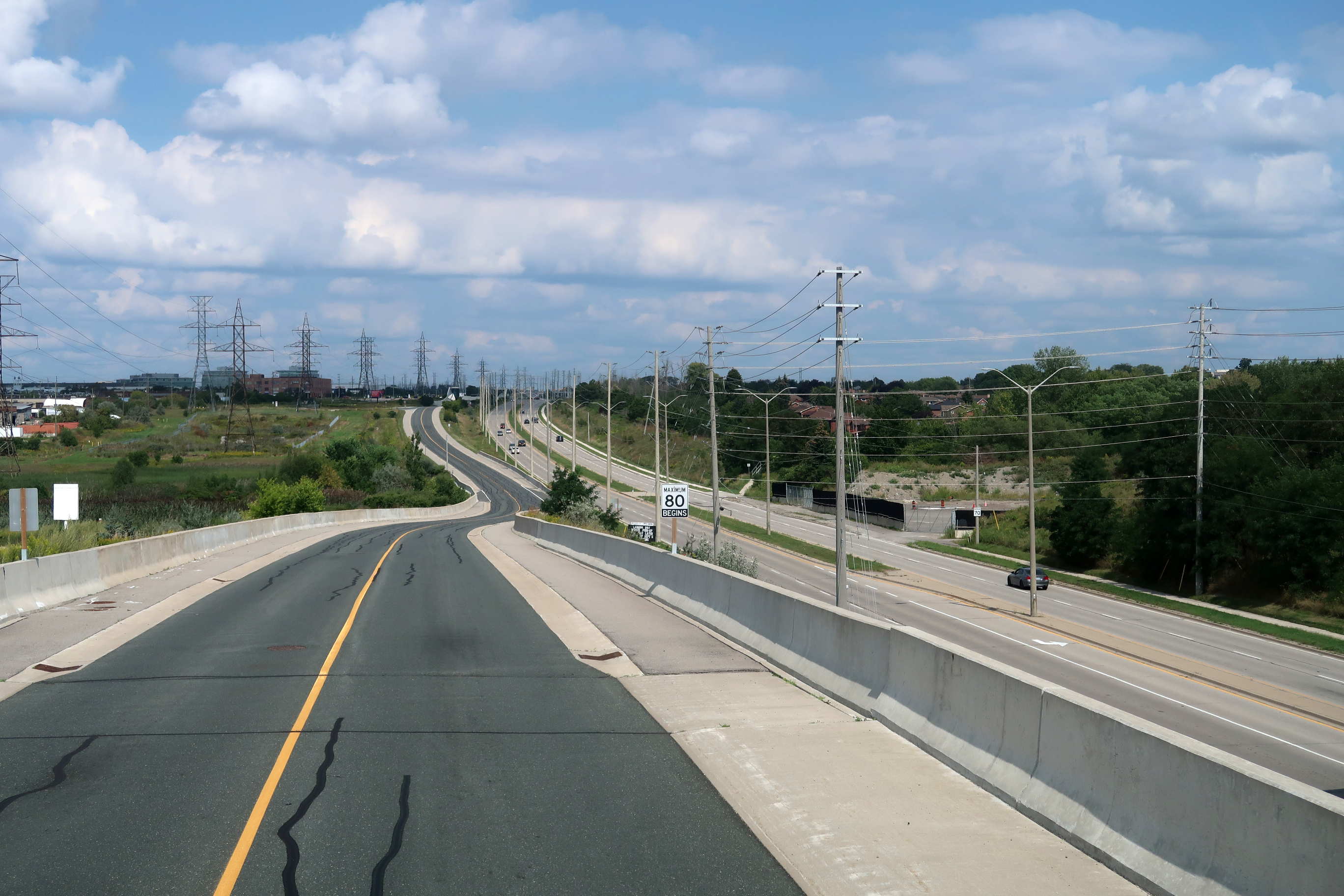
The Mississauga Transitway running alongside Eastgate Parkway

Eastgate Parkway
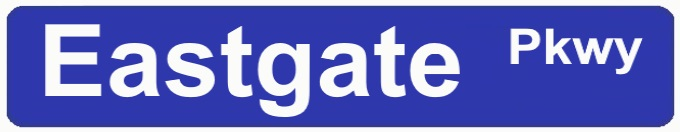
- Location: Highway 403 - Eglinton Ave. (continues north as Creekbank Dr.)

Eastgate Parkway was also constructed in the early 1990s, as an arterial extension of the east–west leg of Highway 403 where the freeway sharply turns north to meet Highway 401 near the northern terminus of Cawthra Road. It runs east to Fieldgate Drive, where it curves north to end at Eglinton Avenue. A portion of the Mississauga Transitway runs parallel to the road for its entire length.

=== Eglinton Avenue ===
Eglinton Avenue
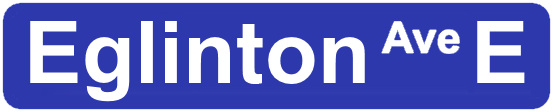
- Location: Highway 407 overpass — Renforth Drive (continues east into Toronto; west into Milton as Lower Baseline)

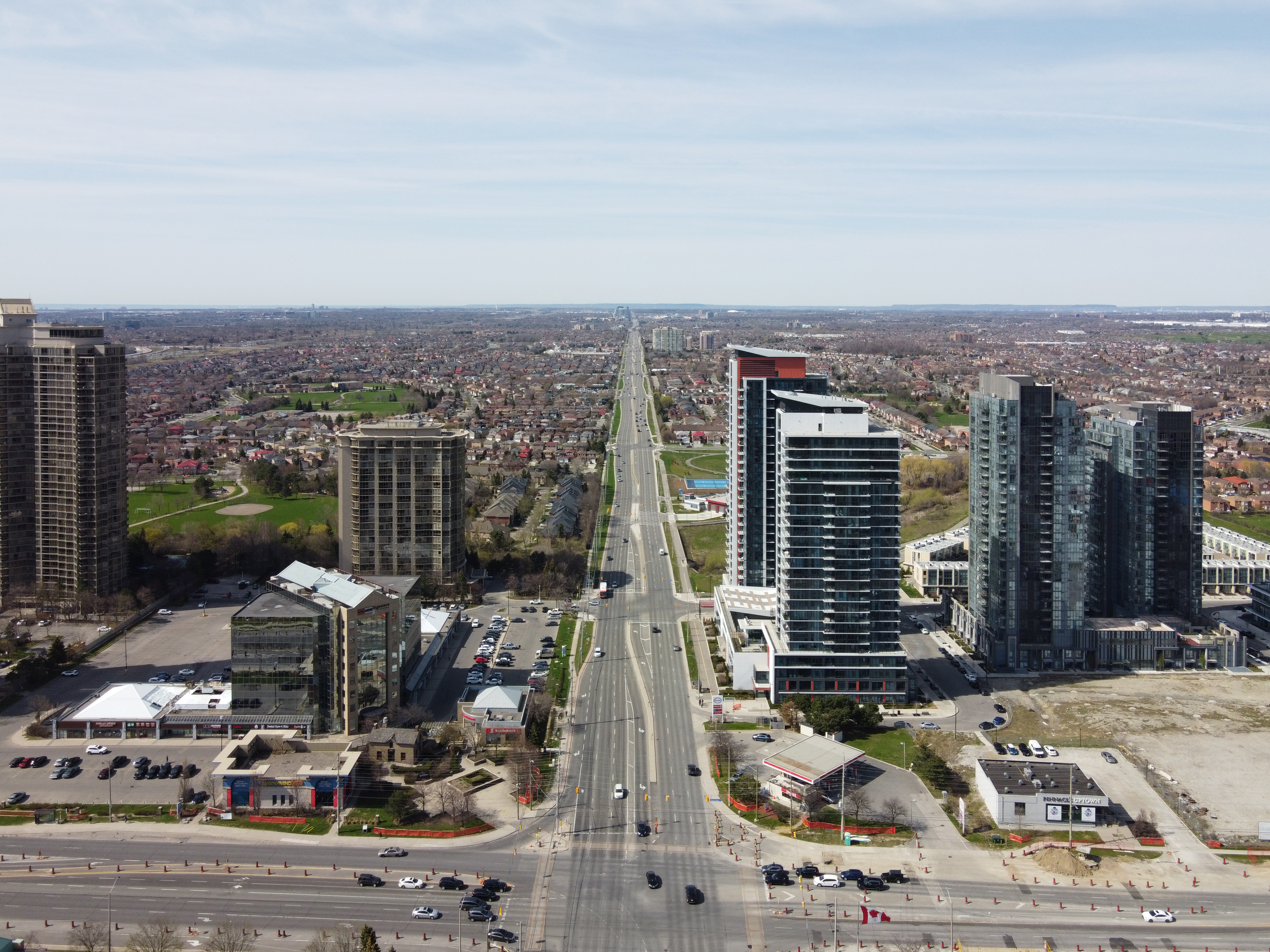
Aerial view along Eglinton Ave. looking west from Hurontario St.

Eglinton Avenue continues west from Toronto and continues further west into Milton as Lower Baseline. From Renforth Drive west to the Etobicoke Creek, it forms part of the Mississauga-Toronto city boundary. The Mississauga Transitway runs along the north side of the street along this stretch.

Formerly called Lower Baseline, which was so named due its role as the divider between two separate concession road surveys, which resulted in it being the original termini of several north–south roads on both sides of it.

=== Matheson Boulevard ===
Matheson Boulevard
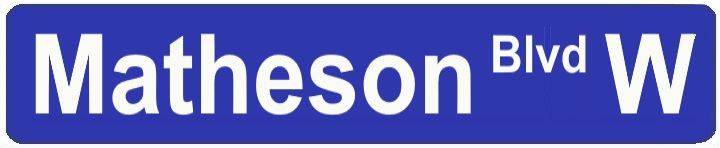
- Location: Terry Fox Way — Renforth Drive (continues 350 m. east into Toronto)

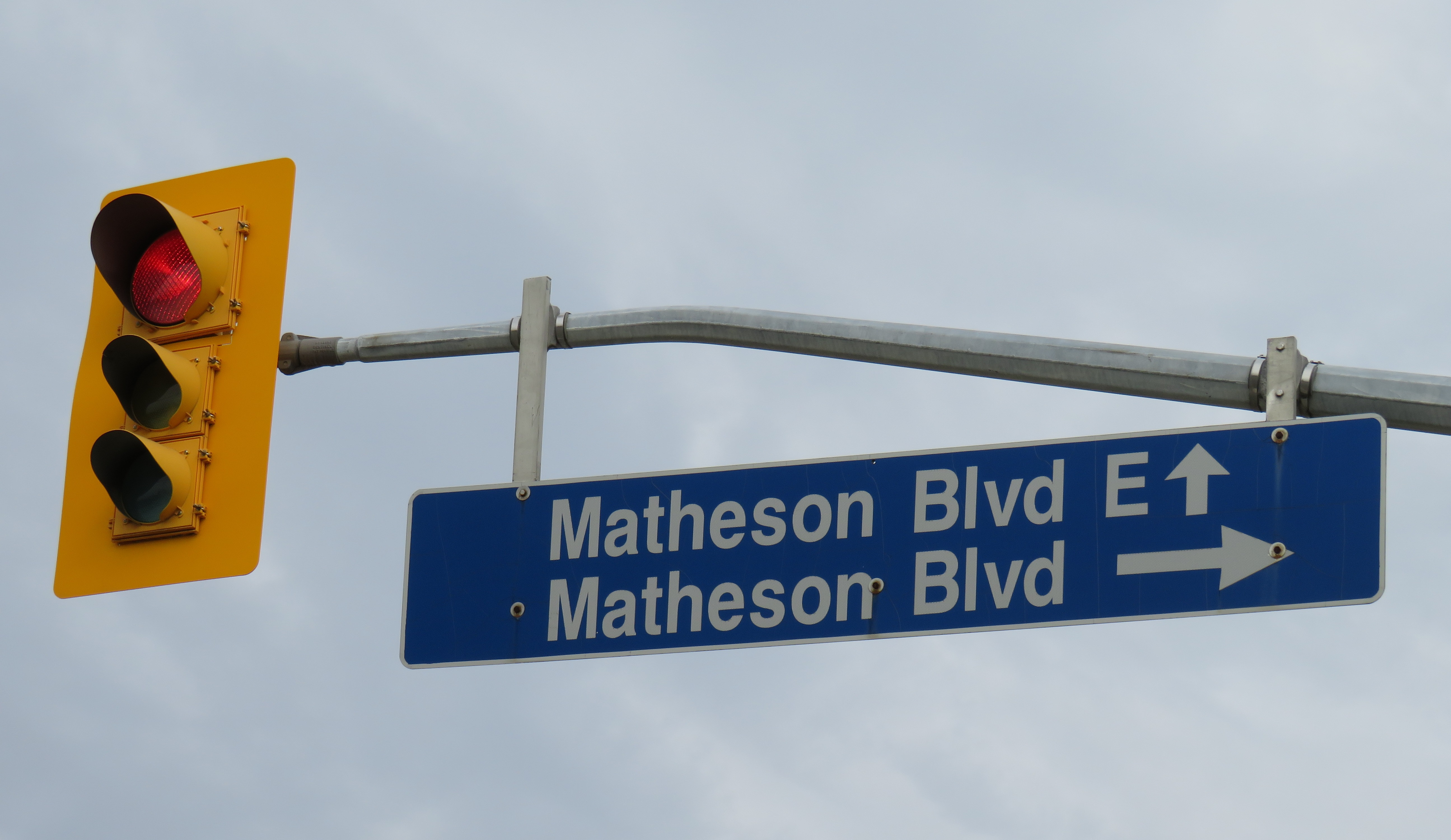
Street sign at the corner of the two Matheson Blvds.

Matheson Boulevard is a mid-concession road built in modern times and follows a gradual diagonal course. It runs east from Terry Fox Way to Renforth Drive and has a brief 350 metre (0.2 mile) extension into Toronto via an overpass to meet Eglinton Ave. It was originally an L-shaped side street centred around Dixie Road, east of which it turned south. It was later widened and extended in both directions, with the eastern section through the Airport Corporate Centre separated from the western section until it was bridged over the Etobicoke Creek. The extension resulted in the short north–south section being bypassed, though it was not renamed, and was itself extended south to meet Eglinton. However, this is technically not a name duplication, as the main section of the street carries an "East" designation, while the bypassed portion does not.

=== Britannia Road ===
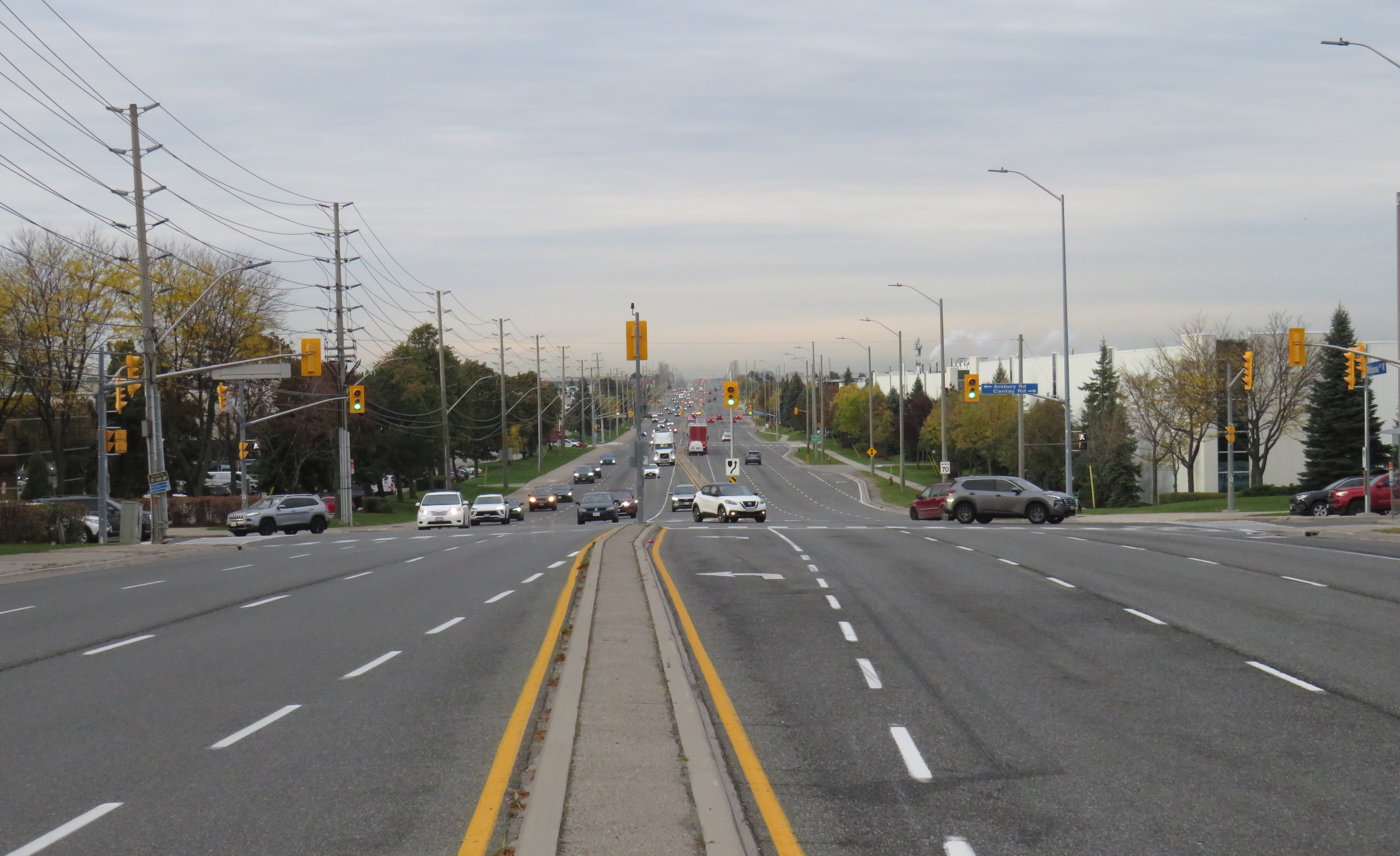
Britannia Road looking west from Hurontario St.

Britannia Road
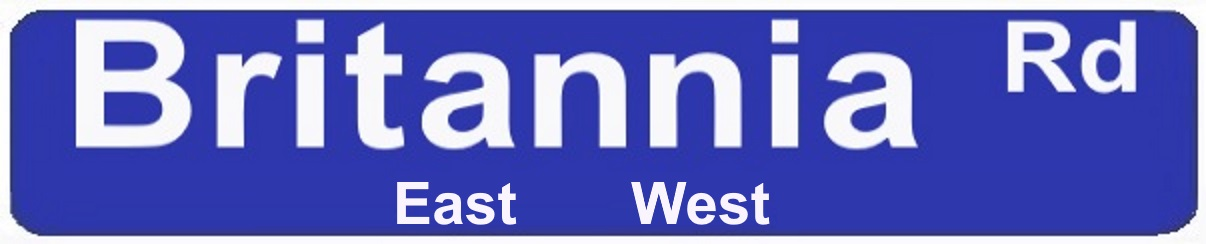
- Location: Highway 407 - Pearson Airport cargo terminal (interrupted by the Highways 401, 403, and 410 interchange; continues west into Milton)

Britannia Road is named after the historic hamlet of Britannia, which was located at the intersection of Hurontario St, where its historic church and cemetery still stand. It continues east from Milton, and is designated as Peel Regional Road 3 as far as Hurontario St. It then continues to Kennedy Road, where it breaks due to the presence of the Highways 401, 403, and 410 stack interchange. It resumes west of Tomken Road and ends in the cargo terminal area of Toronto Pearson International Airport. Originally extended to Indian Line (now mostly part of present-day Highway 427) but that section was cut off by the airport, though the easternmost portion still exists and is named Elmbank Drive, after the hamlet the airport displaced.

=== Courtneypark Drive ===
Courtneypark Drive
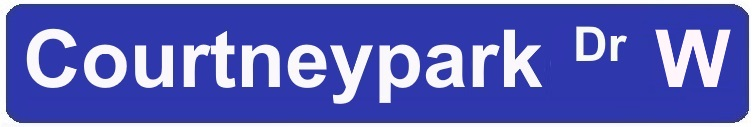
- Location: Mavis Rd. - Britannia Rd.

Courtneypark Drive is a modern, mid-concession road and runs east from Mavis Road and joins with Britannia Rd. in the western infield area of Pearson Airport.

=== Derry Road ===
Derry Road
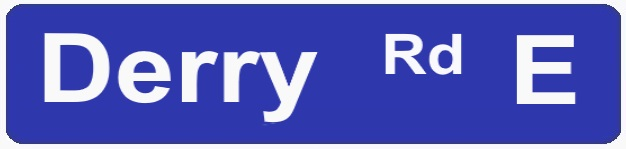
- Location: Highway 407 - Highway 427 (continues west into Milton; east into Toronto as Rexdale Blvd.)

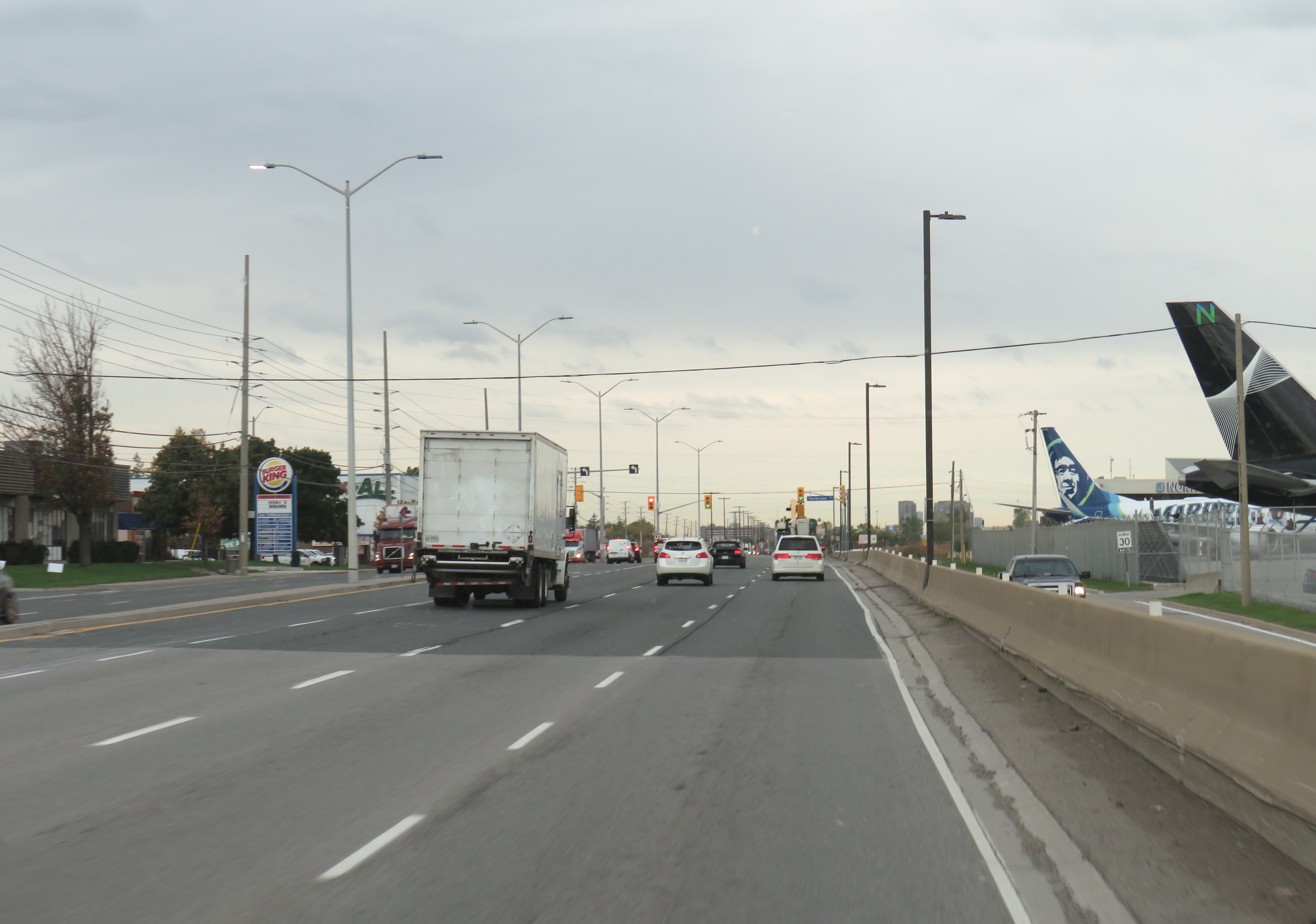
Derry Road at the foot of Torbram Road near Pearson Airport

Derry Road is designated as Peel Regional Road 5. It serves as the primary east–west route for the city's most northerly neighbourhoods, including Malton, Meadowvale, and Lisgar. Through Meadowvale Village a newer, six-lane bypass was built to the north of the original road to preserve the former rural hamlet; the bypassed section has since been renamed as Old Derry Road. Between Dixie and Airport Roads, Derry passes through Pearson Airport to the north. After exiting Malton at Highway 427, the street continues as Rexdale Boulevard in Toronto.

== North–south roads ==
Mississauga's north–south roads were lines, running perpendicular to the concession roads, with Hurontario St. as the dividing line. Due to the separate survey grids on either side of Eglinton Ave., few roads run the full north–south distance through the city, except where the two grids line up.

WEST of Hurontario

=== Ninth Line ===
Ninth Line
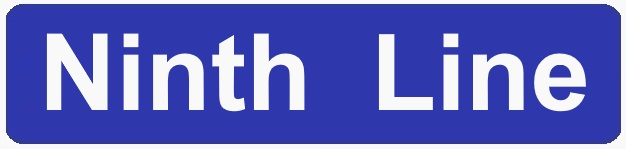
- Location: Dundas St.- north city limits (continues south into Oakville; north into Halton Hills)

Ninth Line (not to be confused with Ninth Line in York Region) was originally within Halton Region, and its designation is a throwback to the numbered line-road sequence within it; beginning at present-day Tremaine Road in the west as the baseline, Bronte Street in Milton being First; Highway 25 Second; and so on.

When Mississauga was incorporated as a city, land was transferred from Halton to Peel. At that time, Ninth Line marked much of the western boundary between Mississauga and Halton Region. Due to an additional annexation west to Highway 407 in 2010, the central section is now entirely within the city, but the road was never redesignated to reflect this. However, the stretch between Dundas St. and the vicinity of the Highways 403 and 407 interchange still serves as the west city limits, and Ninth Line also continues entirely within Halton north and south of these points.

=== Winston Churchill Boulevard ===
Winston Churchill Boulevard
- Location: Lakeshore Rd. - Highway 401 (continues north and forms the boundary of Halton Hills and Brampton)

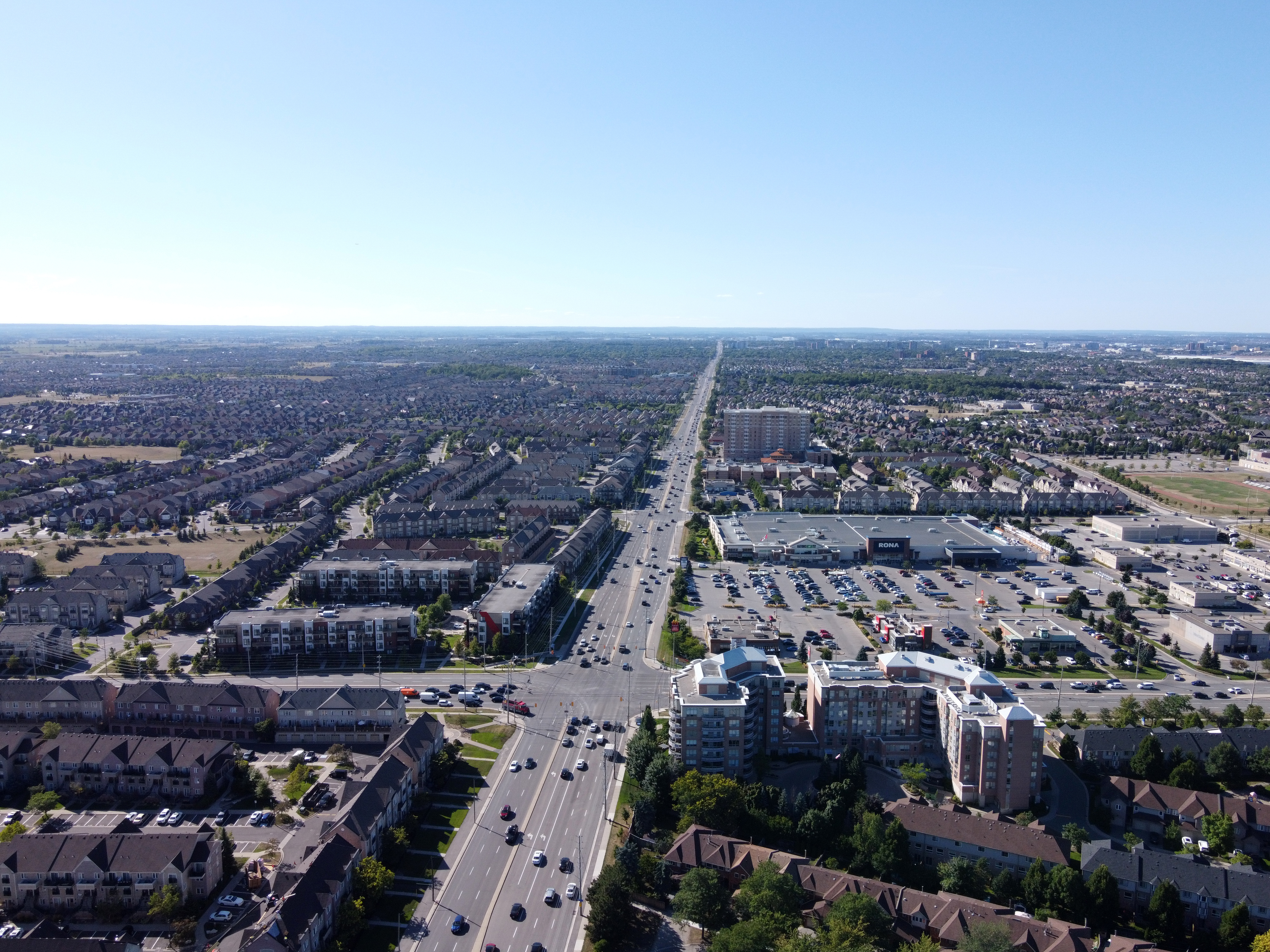
Aerial view of Winston Churchill Blvd. looking north from south of Eglinton Ave.

Winston Churchill Boulevard is designated Regional Road 19 between Lakeshore Rd. and Dundas St. It was the original western boundary of the city, and the historic boundary between Halton and Peel Counties, until the lands to the west (from Dundas St. northwards) were transferred from Halton to Peel upon their restructuring into regional municipalities. It still forms the city limits south of Dundas.

The Mississauga Transitway's Winston Churchill Station is located on the west side of the road, just north of where it interchanges with Highway 403.

=== Glen Erin Drive ===
Glen Erin Drive
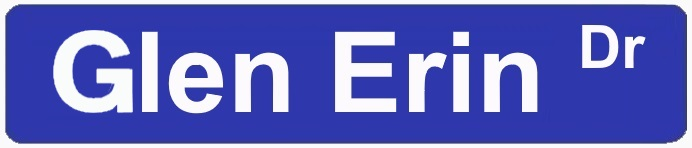
- Location: Dundas St. - Derry Rd.

Glen Erin Drive is a winding road that was constructed in phases to serve the planned communities of Erin Mills and Meadowvale, with the central connecting portion being completed in 1993.

=== Southdown Road ===
Southdown Road
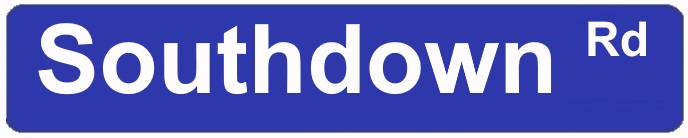
- Location: Lakeshore Rd. - QEW (continues west as the western leg of Lakeshore Rd; north as Erin Mills Pkwy)

Southdown Road begins where Lakeshore Rd. jogs by continuing it northwards at a 90-degree curve, functioning as the link between Lakeshore's two sections. It has two lanes until just south of the intersection of Royal Windsor Dr. and the eastern leg of Lakeshore, and widens to four lanes until it reaches the Queen Elizabeth Way, where it continues as Erin Mills Parkway.

Clarkson GO Station is located on the road.

=== Erin Mills Parkway ===
Erin Mills Parkway
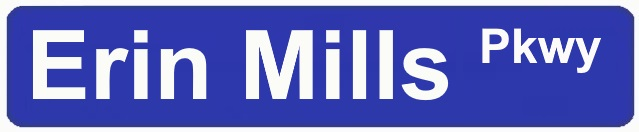
- Location: QEW — Turner Valley/Mississauga Rds. (continues south as Southdown Rd; north as Mississauga Rd.)

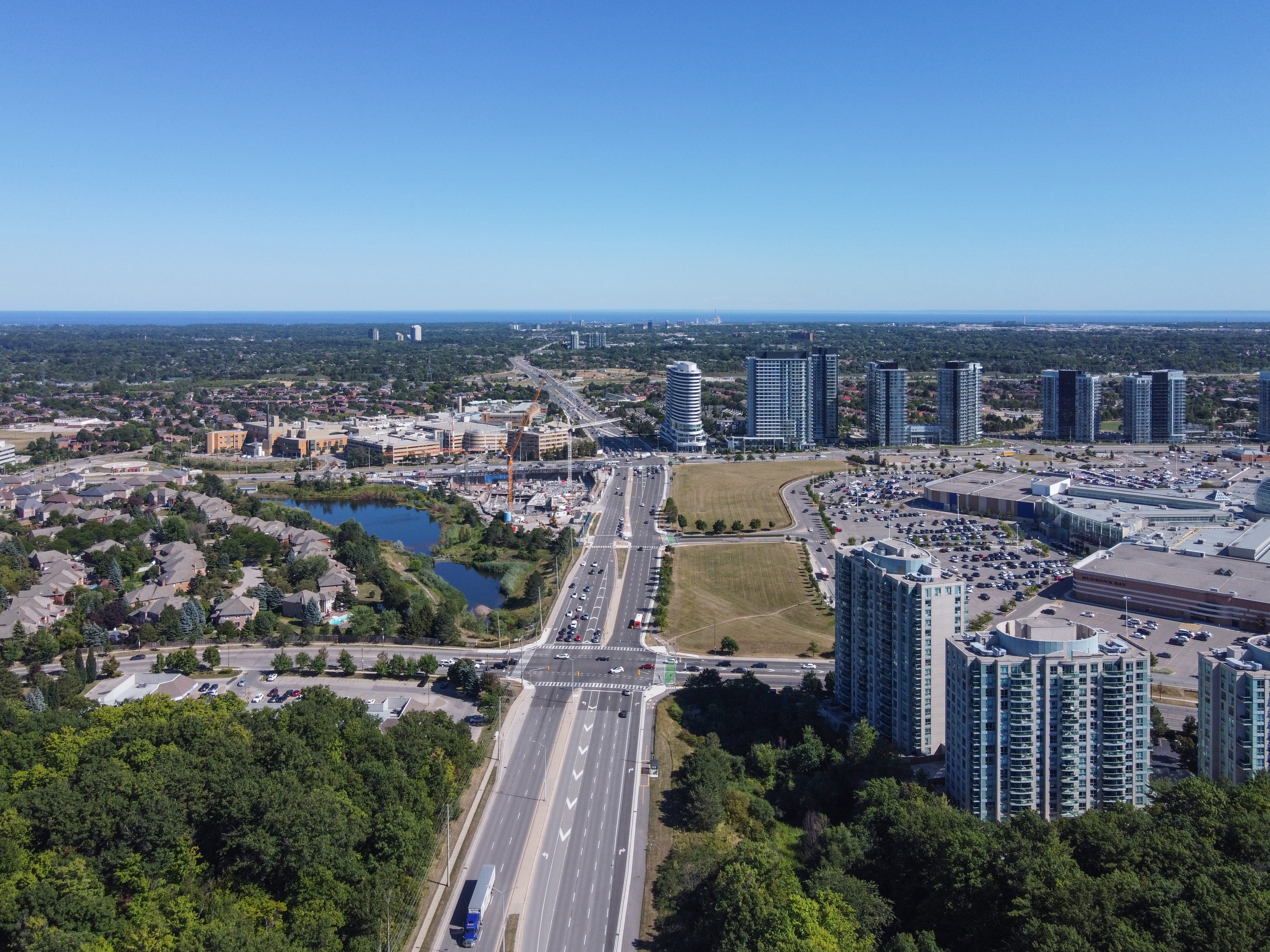
Erin Mills Parkway at Erin Mills Town Centre

Erin Mills Parkway is designated Regional Road 1, and is a very busy six-lane arterial which begins at the Queen Elizabeth Way as a continuation of Southdown Rd. It was named after the Erin Mills community through which it predominantly runs and was built as a realignment of Fifth Line West (which still exists in two sections; the first which still runs for approximately 1 km. (0.6 mi.) on each side of Dundas St., and the second as a part of Turney Drive, which also incorporates a former section of Thomas Street) and runs north to the intersection of Mississauga and Turner Valley Roads. Mississauga Road turns in from the east and continues Erin Mills' course northwards.

The Mississauga Transitway's Erin Mills Station is located on the west side of the street, just north of where it interchanges with Highway 403.

=== Mississauga Road ===
Mississauga Road
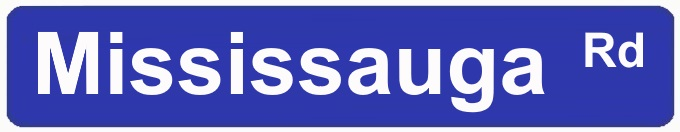
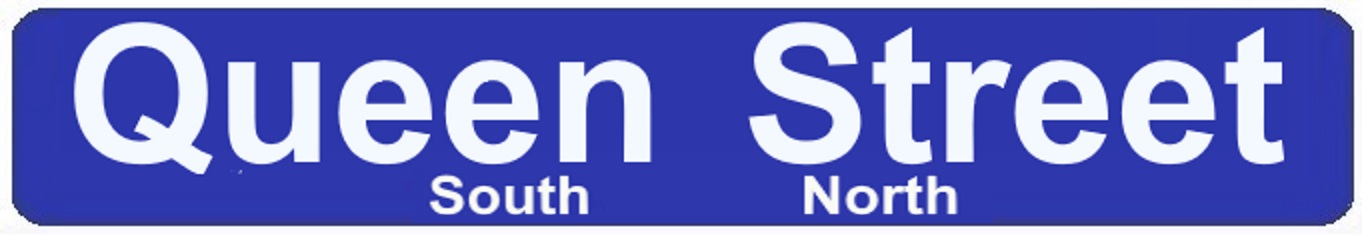
- Location: Lake Ontario — north city limits (continues north into Brampton)

Mississauga Road begins at J.C. Saddington Park by as a north–south road, then angles northwest from near the QEW to south of Dundas St. where it resumes its north–south course. It serves as the main drag of Streetsville where it is called Queen Street and uses Britannia Rd. as an anomalous local north–south divider. Despite its length, its a predominantly low-capacity two-lane road until Britannia Road, where it widens to four lanes, and expands to a major six-lane artery after it merges with Erin Mills Pkwy (see above) and assumes the Regional Road 1 designation just south of Highway 401. It continues into Brampton and ends in Caledon.

From Eglinton northwards, it was formerly Fourth Line West.

=== Creditview Road ===
Creditview Road
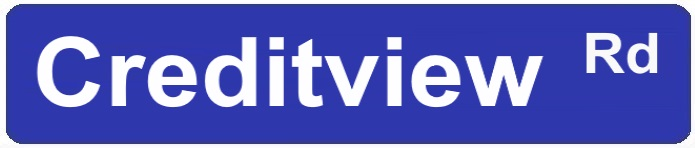
- Location: Burnhamthorpe Rd. - Derry Rd. (continues south as Central Pkwy.; north as Meadowvale Blvd.)

Creditview Road gets its name due to it running very near or within the Credit River valley, although it only runs through the valley itself within Brampton today. The southern portion between Burnhamthorpe Rd. and Eglinton Ave. was realigned to link with the western leg of Central Parkway. The old portion was renamed, on each side of Highway 403, as Perivale and Rathkeale Roads, with their former status as Creditview being evident by the utility poles which still line them. To the north, the street was also realigned near Derry and Old Derry Roads to bring it outside the Credit River valley and interline it with Meadowvale Boulevard, leaving two bypassed sections: Old Creditview Road and Bellshire Gate. Consequently, the Mississauga section of Creditview is now entirely discontinuous from the Brampton section.

=== Mavis Road ===
Mavis Road
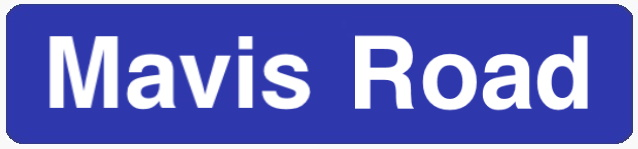
- Location: Queensway — north city limits (continues south as Stavebank Rd; north into Brampton)

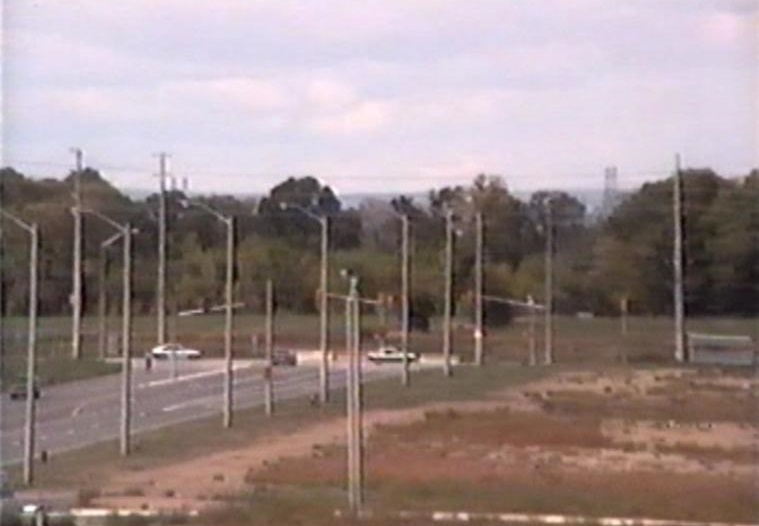
The former northern terminus of Mavis Rd. at Britannia Rd. in 1991.

Mavis Road is a continuation (and formerly part) of Stavebank Road. It originally ended at Eglinton, but was extended to its present length in two phases during the 1990s, bypassing Second Line West (see Terry Fox Way) to preserve Meadowvale Village, and then merging with it just north of the city limits in Brampton.

The Canadian Pacific Railway crossing north of Dundas St. (since replaced by an underpass) was the site of the infamous 1979 train derailment.

=== Confederation Parkway ===
Confederation Parkway
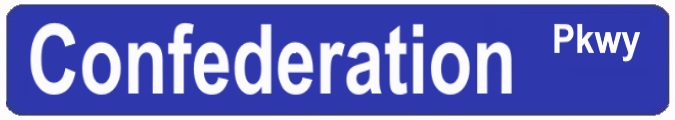
- Location: Queensway — Eglinton Ave. (continues north as McLaughlin Rd.)

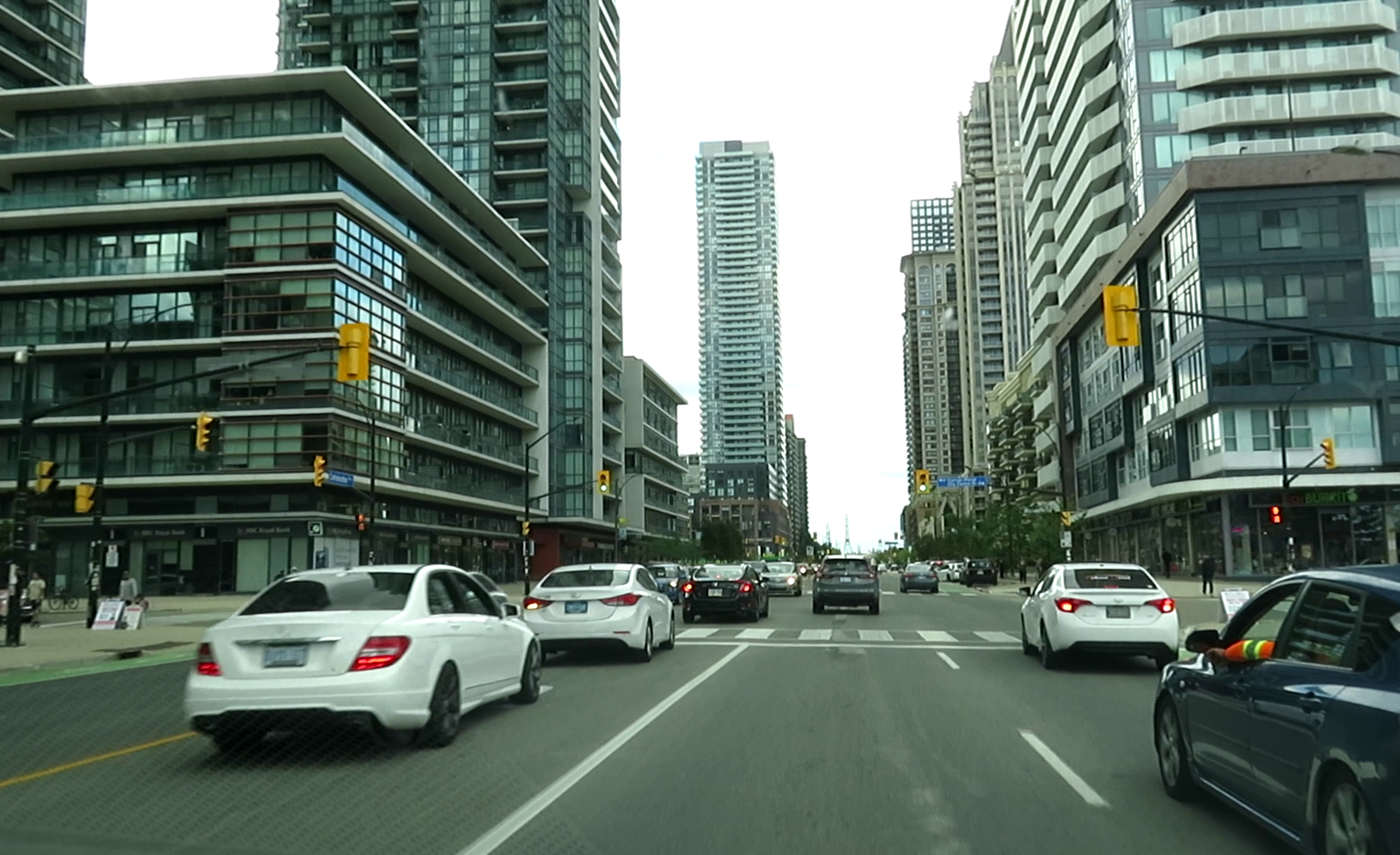
Highrises lining Confederation Pkwy. in the City Centre

Confederation Parkway begins as a two-lane road at Queensway, widens to four lanes at Dundas St., and curves northwesterly towards Eglinton Ave. The short section through the City Centre is rapidly developing into an urban canyon flanked with highrise condominiums.

=== McLaughlin Road ===
McLaughlin Road
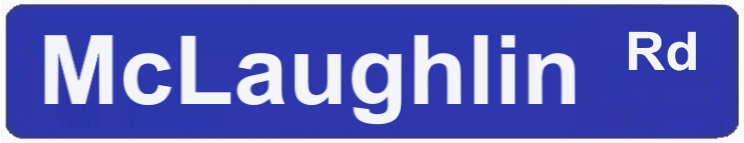
- Location: Eglinton Ave. - north city limits (continues south as Confederation Pkwy; north into Brampton)

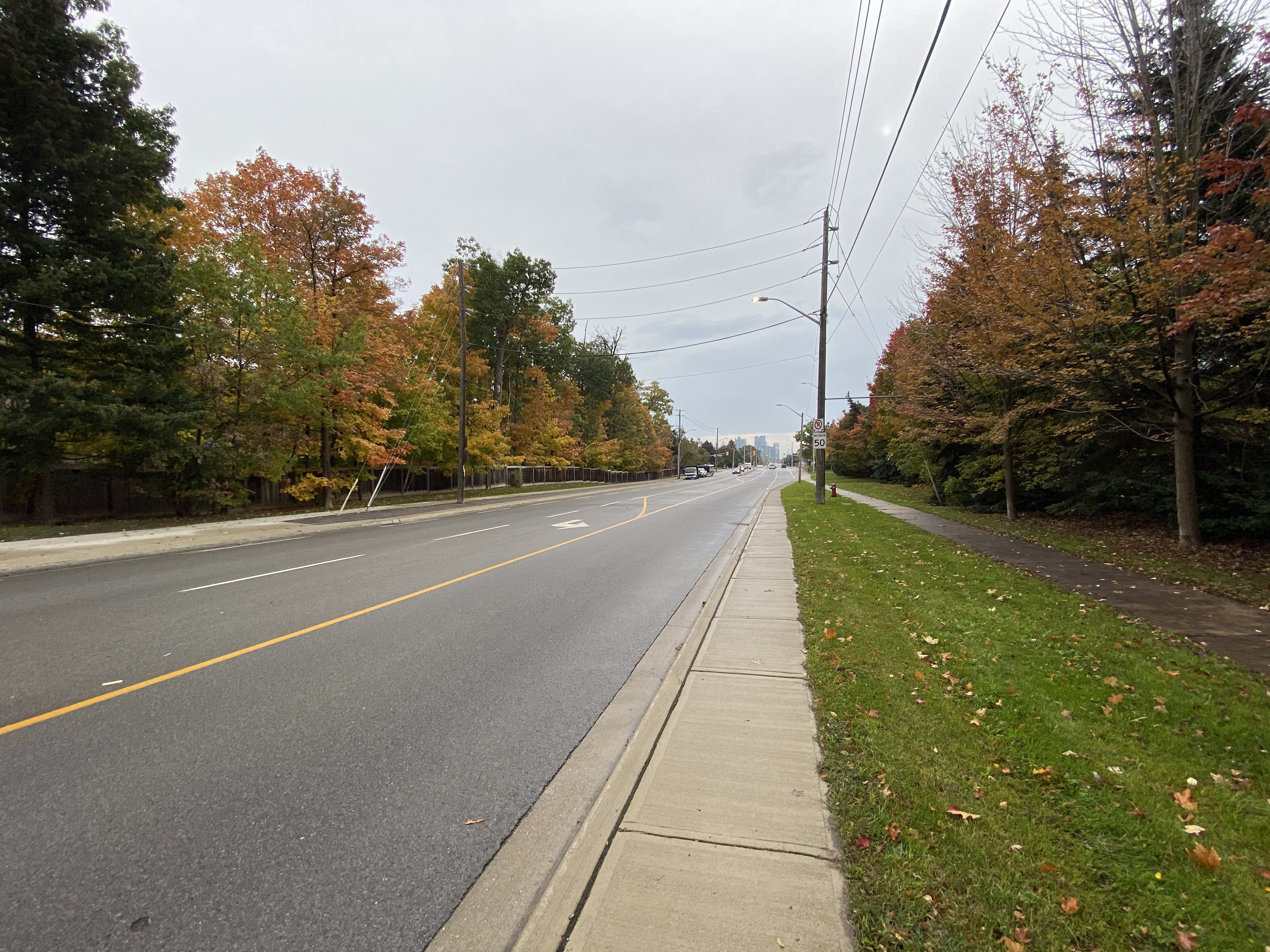
Two-lane section McLaughlin Rd. near the Britannia Farm sugar bush

McLaughlin Road is a continuation of Confederation Parkway. When it was reconstructed from a rural to a suburban road in 1989, it was built with only two lanes between Bristol Road and Matheson Boulevard to preserve a maple sugar bush on the western boundary of the historic Britannia Farm property.

=== Hurontario Street ===
Hurontario Street
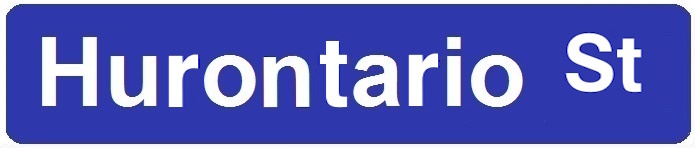
- Location: Lakeshore Rd. - north city limits (continues north into Brampton)

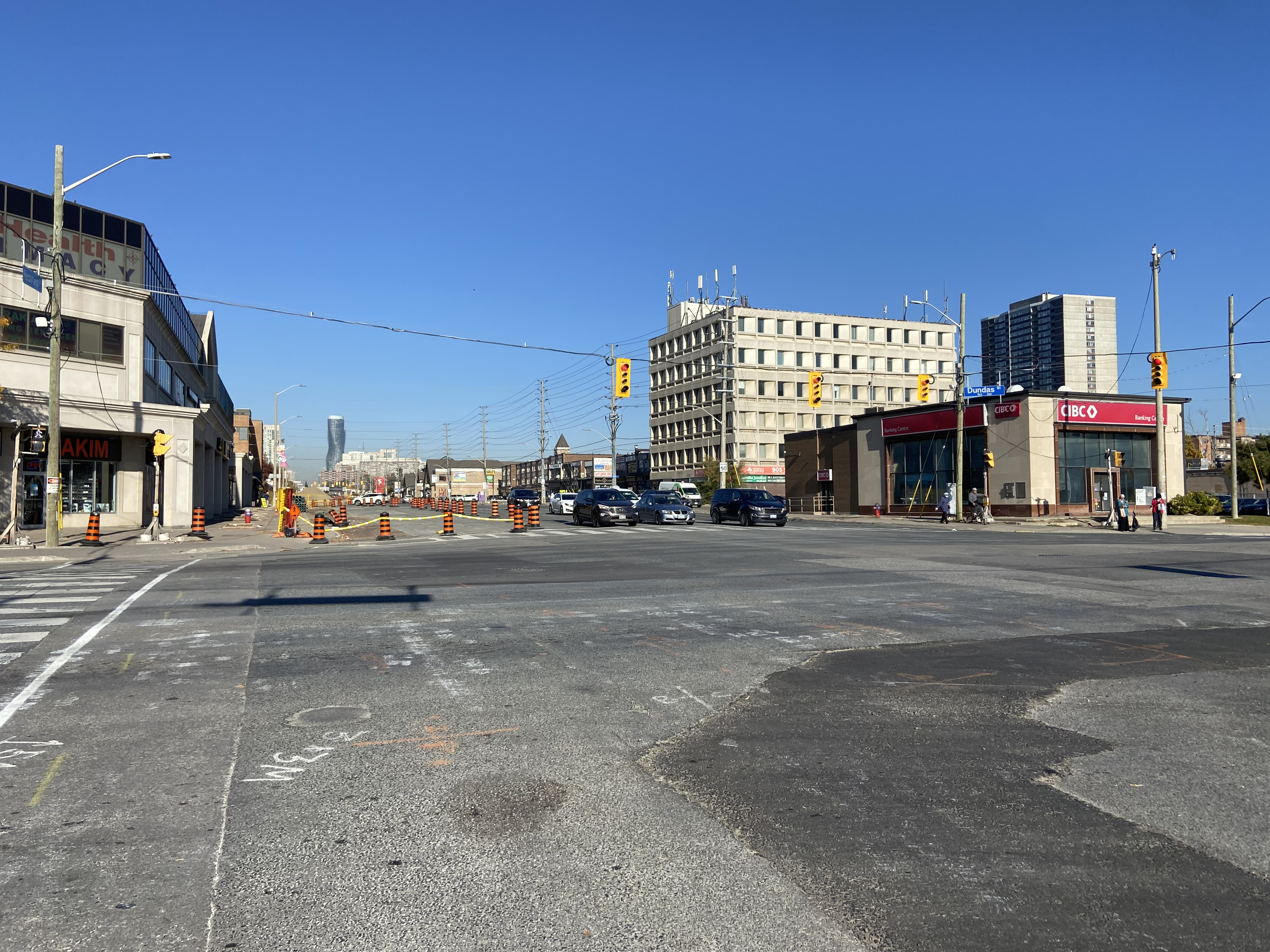
Looking north up Hurontario St. from Dundas St.

Hurontario Street is Mississauga's main street. Runs north from Lakeshore Road (Lake Ontario) and continues all the way to Collingwood on Georgian Bay (Lake Huron), hence the street's name. Formerly part of Highway 10 and still often colloquially labelled as such. The Hurontario LRT, a light rail transit line planned to run along the street, has been approved. Construction began in 2020 and the line is projected to enter service in fall 2024.

Hurontario was the centre of the land survey, and marks the division between 'East' and 'West'.

EAST of Hurontario

=== Kennedy Road ===
Kennedy Road
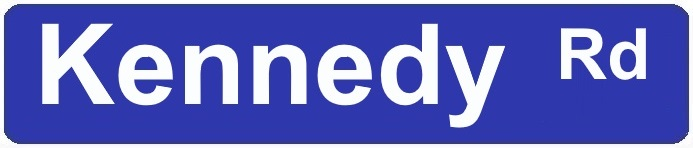
- Location: Eglinton Ave. - north city limits (continues south as Central Parkway; north into Brampton)

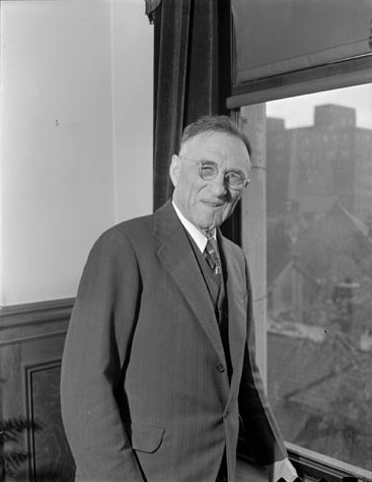
Thomas Laird Kennedy, the 15th Premier of Ontario; whom Kennedy Rd. is named after

Kennedy Road runs north from Eglinton Ave. and continues south of it as Central Parkway. It is named after Thomas Laird Kennedy, a former local MPP and the 15th Premier of Ontario.

=== Cawthra Road ===
Cawthra Road
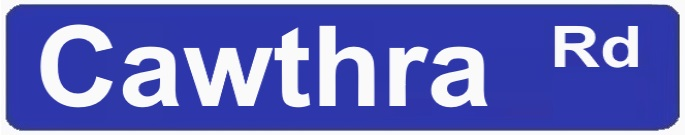
- Location: Lakeshore Rd. - Highway 403

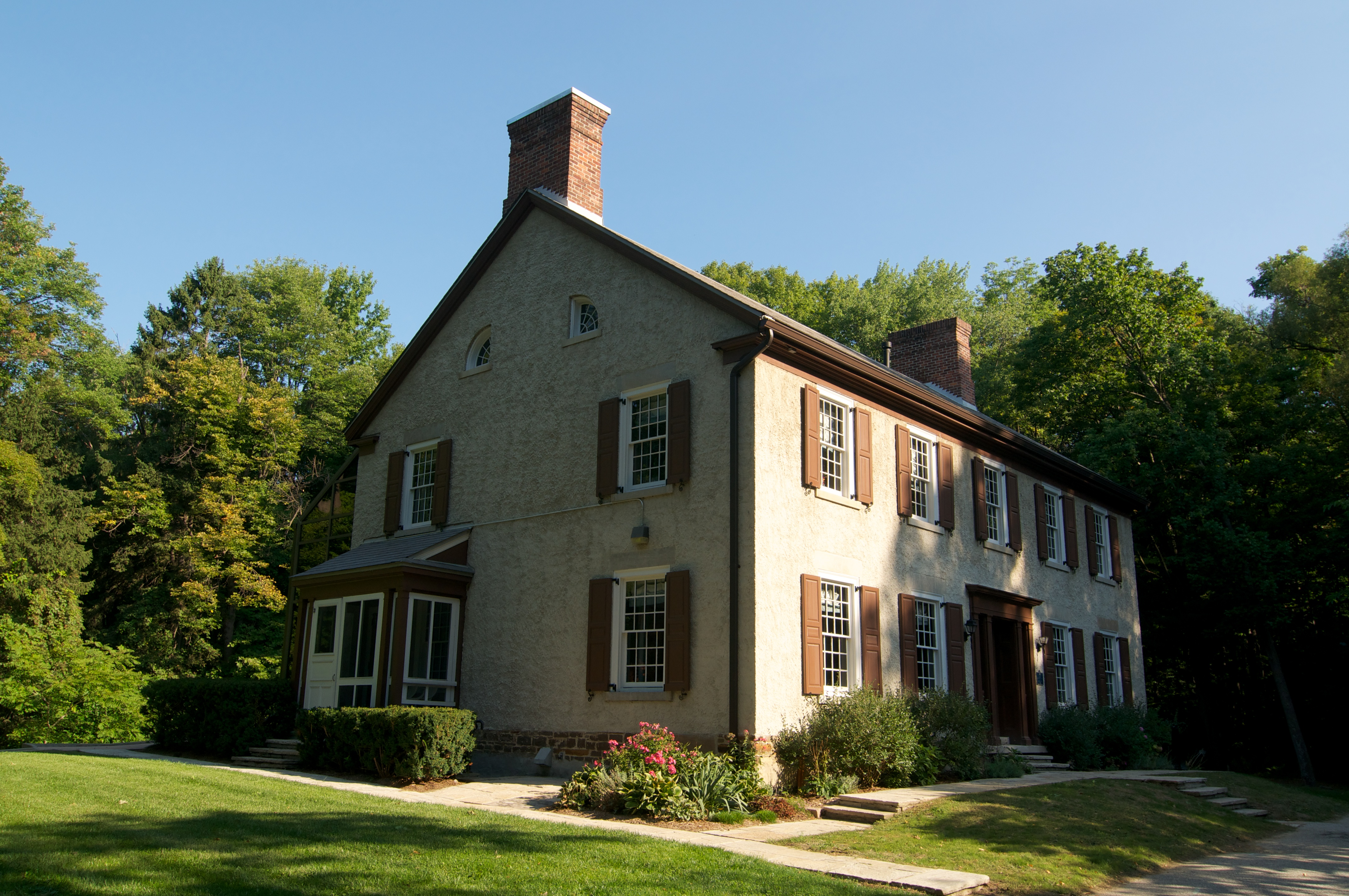
Cawthra Estate

Cawthra Road is designated as Peel Regional Road 17 and runs from Lakeshore Road to Eastgate Parkway and then interchanges with Highway 403. The road originally continued to Eglinton Avenue, but its northernmost section was absorbed into the present interchange, though access to/from Eglinton is still provided via the ramps. Named after the Cawthra family, whose estate, today owned by the City of Mississauga, is still located on the road.

The Mississauga Transitway's Cawthra Station was named after the street, though its physical location is on Eastgate Pkwy, about 200 m to its east.

=== Tomken Road ===
Tomken Road
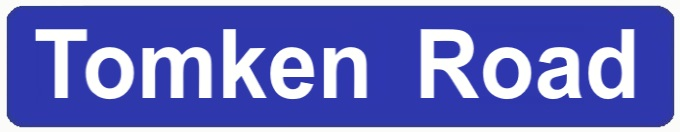
- Location: Dundas St. - north city limits (continues north into Brampton)

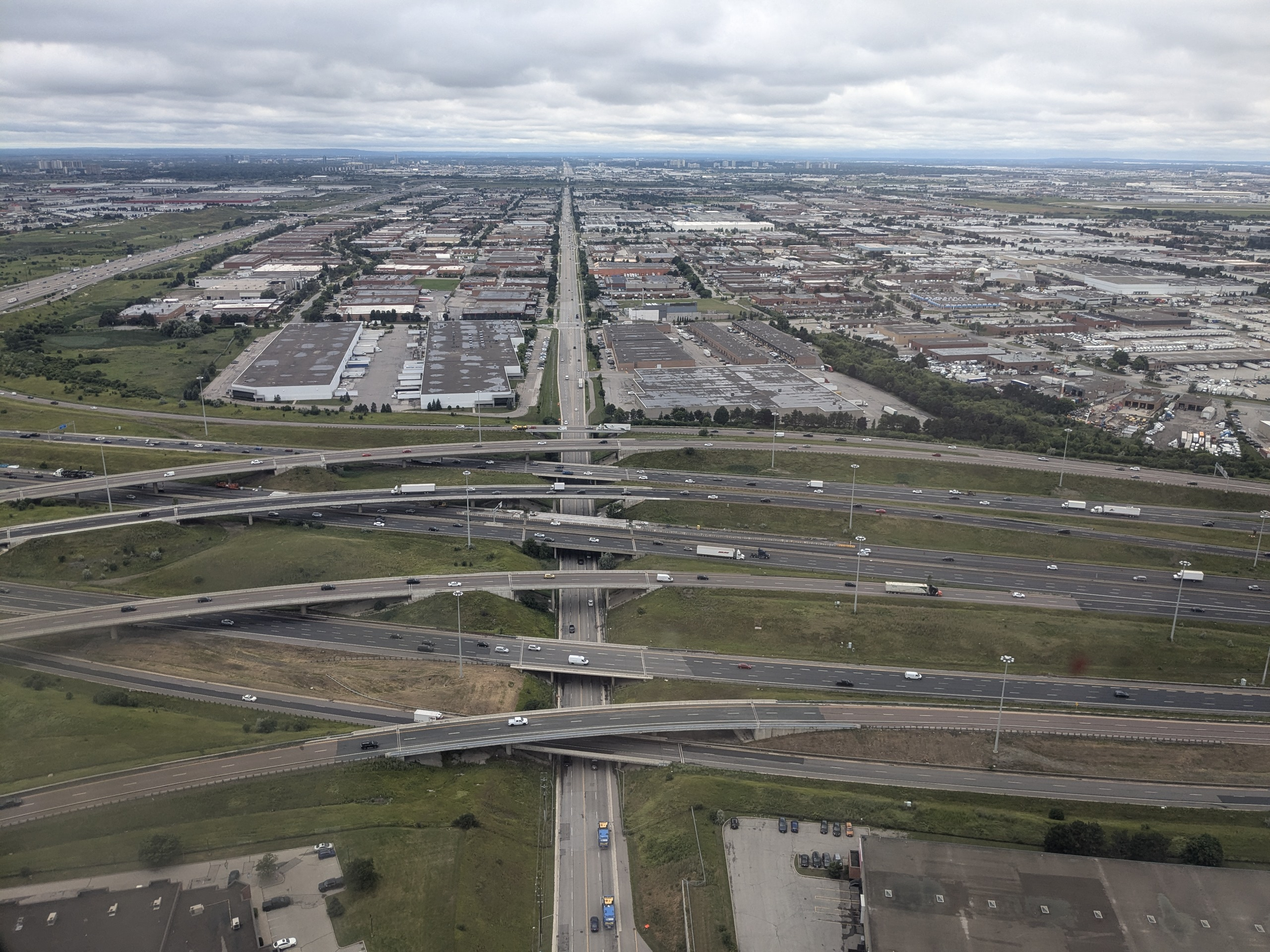
Tomken Road looking north from Highway 401. Note Highway 410 (left) swinging east to follow Tomken Rd's alignment in the distance (top), showing its former status as part of Heart Lake Rd, which was subsumed by the highway through Brampton.

Tomken Road runs north from Dundas Street and into Brampton. Like Kennedy Road, it is named for Thomas Laird Kennedy, with "Tomken" being a portmanteau: Tom Kennedy. In the road's earliest days it was known as Second Line East, and is one of the few concession roads extended pre-20th century to pass through both survey grids. The portion north of Eglinton Ave. was once called Heart Lake Road (parts of which still exist to the north in Brampton), but was absorbed into Tomken, as a result of both a jog elimination at Eglinton, and of being severed from the Brampton section due to Highway 410 subsuming most of its route in that city.

The Mississauga Transitway's Tomken Station is located on the road's west side, just north of Eastgate Pkwy.

=== Dixie Road ===
Dixie Road
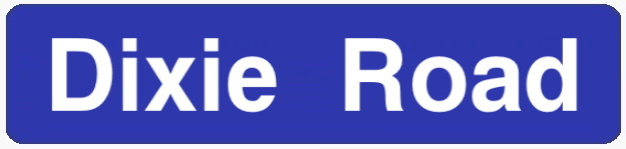
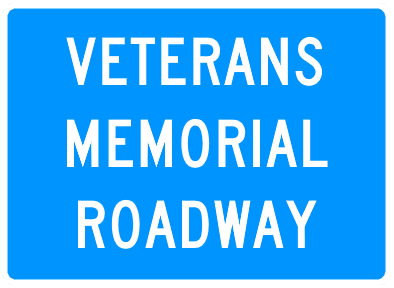
- Location: Lakeshore Rd. - north city limits (continues north into Brampton)

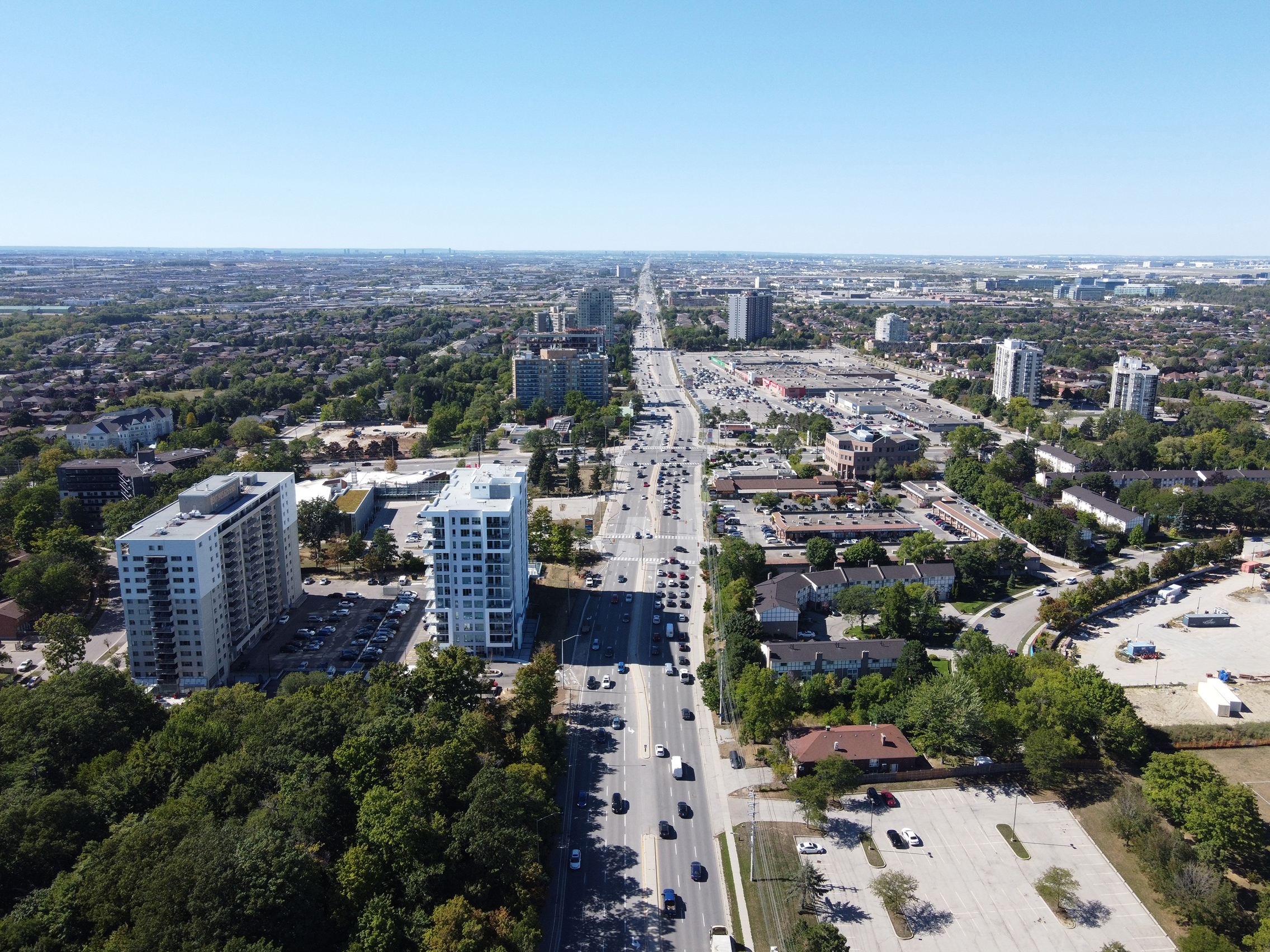
Aerial view of Dixie Road, looking north from near Burnhamthorpe Road

Dixie Road is designated as Peel Regional Road 4 (and also, as of 2016, Veterans Memorial Roadway) and is one of city's busiest roads, with very heavy truck traffic in the industrial areas in the vicinity of Highway 401. It is named after a former hamlet, which itself was named for Dr. Beaumont Dixie, who lived in Erindale. Dixie forms the western boundary of Pearson Airport for a short distance south of Derry Road, and is the easternmost arterial in the southern half of Mississauga, due to the city's eastern boundary tapering towards the lake.

Dixie is the only north–south road (apart from the baseline, Hurontario St.) that was entirely within the historic Toronto Township that was surveyed to run the full distance through the township, and was designated Third Line East.

The Mississauga Transitway's Dixie Station is located on the street's west side, just north of Eastgate Pkwy.

=== Bramalea Road ===
Bramalea Road
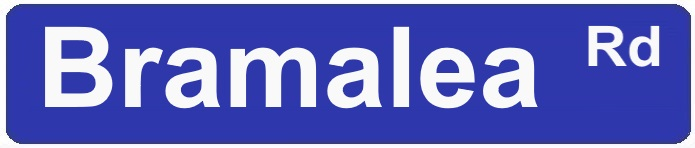
- Location: Dead end south of Derry Rd. - north city limits (continues north into Brampton)

Bramalea Road begins as a dead end south of Derry Rd. and runs north. It is named after the Bramalea district of Brampton—Bramalea being a portmanteau of Brampton, Malton, and lea (an old English word meaning meadow or grassland) created by the farmer William Sheard, who owned a large parcel of cattle grazing land that he sold for the new venture—through which it passes after leaving Mississauga.

=== Torbram Road ===
Torbram Road
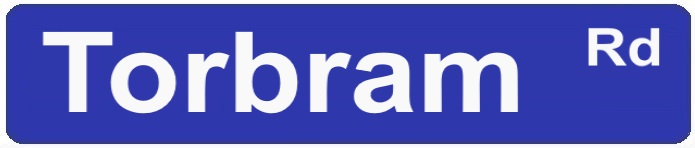
- Location: Derry Rd. - Canadian National Halton Subdivision (North city limits) (continues north into Brampton)

Torbram Road's name is a portmanteau of Toronto and either Brampton or Bramalea. "Toronto" likely refers to Toronto Township, the precursor municipality to Mississauga, rather than to the city. It runs north from Derry Rd. and was originally Fifth Line East, which once continued south to present-day Eglinton Avenue (passing through Elmbank en route), with the southern section being removed with the expansion of Pearson Airport.

=== Airport Road ===
Airport Road
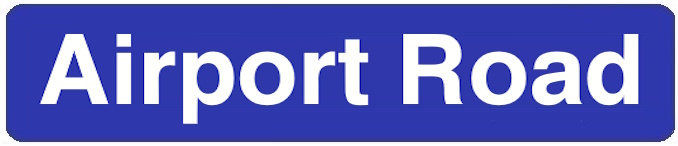
- Location: Highway 427 - CN Halton Sub. (North city limits) (continues north into Brampton; east into Toronto as Dixon Rd)

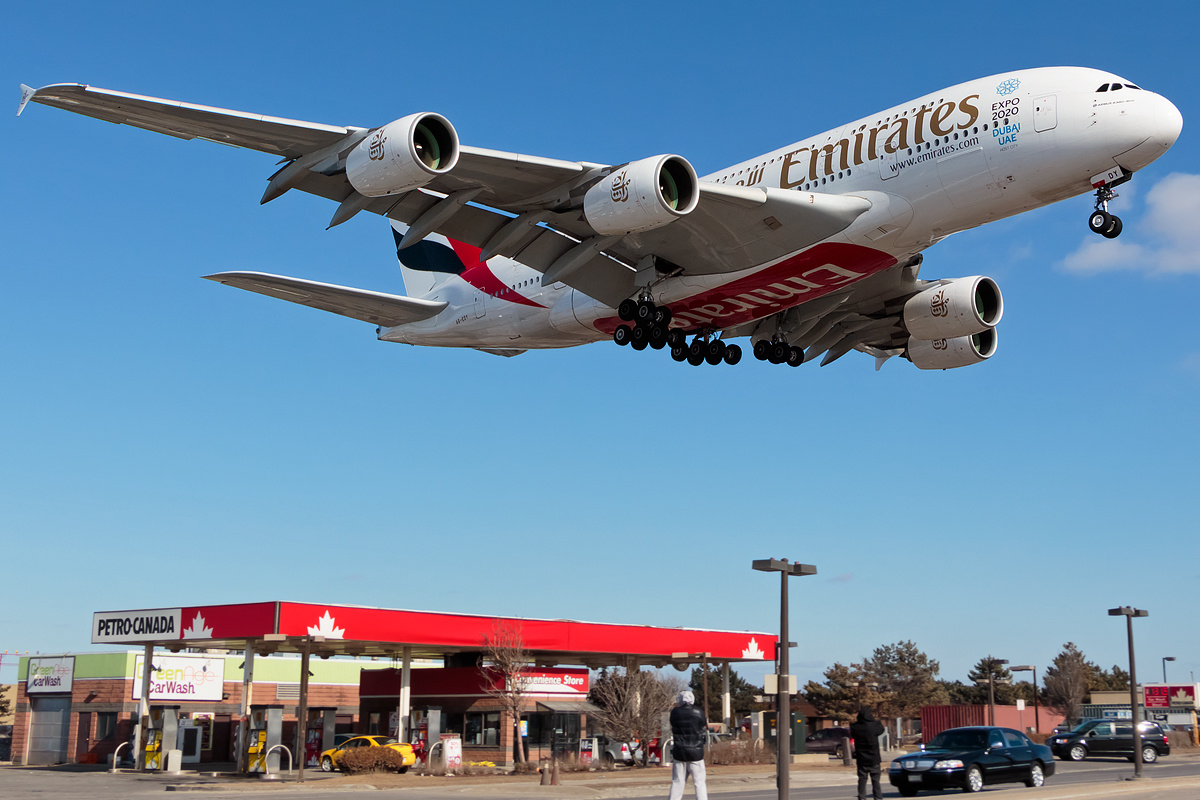
An Airbus A380 landing at Pearson Airport passes low over Airport Road

Airport Road is designated as Peel Regional Road 7 and, as the name suggests, passes by Pearson Airport. Its original southern terminus was at Lower Baseline (present-day Eglinton Ave.) but today swings east to link with Dixon Road in Toronto at Highway 427. Northwards, it runs through the Malton neighbourhood, and continues all the way to the Dufferin/Simcoe County line south of Stayner where it officially loses its name.

=== Goreway Drive ===
Goreway Drive
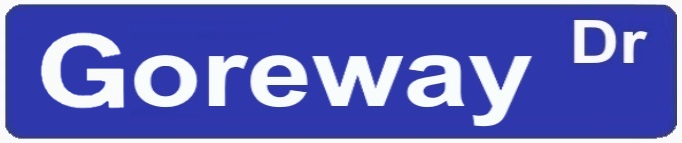
- Location: Highway 427 overpass — CN Halton Sub. (North city limits) (continues north into Brampton; east into Toronto as Disco Rd.)

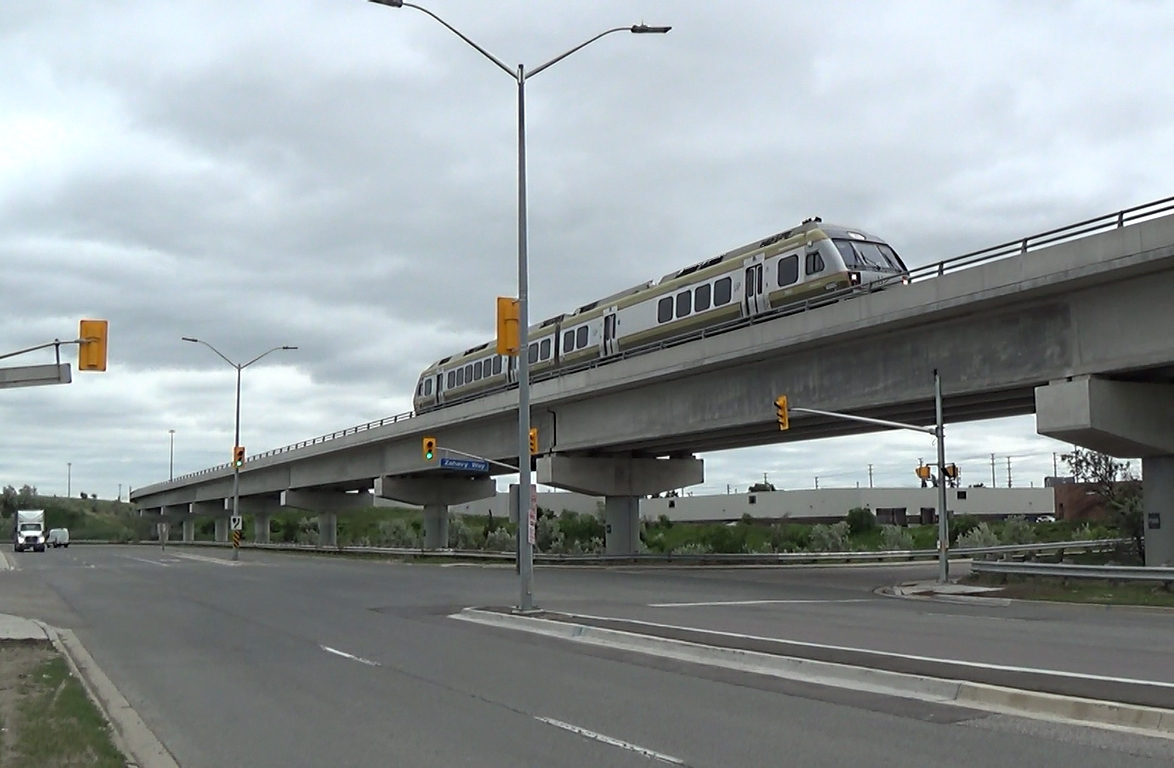
The elevated trackway of the UP Express along Goreway Dr.

Goreway Drive is named after the former Toronto Gore Township. It begins south of Derry Rd. at Highway 427 (but has no interchange), and passes under the freeway into Toronto as Disco Road. The elevated tracks of the Union Pearson Express (UP) run alongside the street near its southern end. To the north it enters Brampton at the Canadian National Halton Subdivision. In 2023, construction started on a long-delayed overpass to replace the former level crossing. The bridge opened to traffic in October 2025.

=== Finch Avenue ===
Finch Avenue
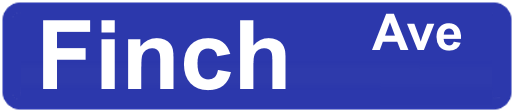
- Location: Highway 427 - CN Halton Sub. (North city limits) (continues north into Brampton; east into Toronto)

Finch Avenue is designated Peel Regional Road 2, and runs for only 1 km. (0.6 mi.) through the extreme northeast corner of the city before continuing into Brampton where it ends at Steeles Avenue after a similarly short distance, making it the shortest regional road in Peel Region. However, to the south, it curves eastwards to cross Highway 427 into Toronto, where it continues as one of that city's major east–west streets and eventually reaches Pickering. The Indian Line Campground, situated in the Claireville Conservation Area, is located on the street.

== Collector roads ==
=== Argentia Road ===
Argentia Road
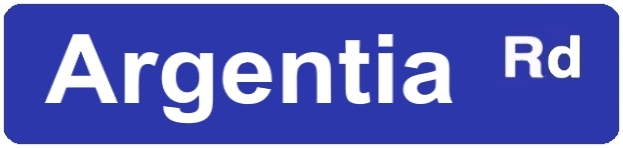
- Location: Ninth Line — Creditview Road

Argentia Road is located in Meadowvale, running east and southeast from Ninth Line and ending at Creditview Road, crossing Derry Rd. just west of where Derry passes under Highway 401. The section between Ninth and Tenth Lines is an extension opened in 2016. Most of the street has four lanes, except for the westernmost section, which has two lanes plus bike lanes.

=== Battleford Road ===
Battleford Road
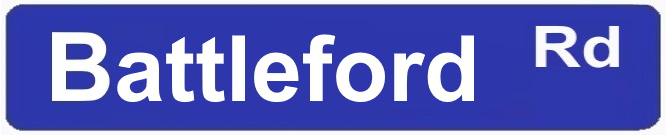
- Location: Tenth Line - Britannia Rd. (continues west as Trelawny Cir.)

Battleford road is a short but important east–west collector in Meadowvale. It runs east from Tenth Line (where it continues as Trelawny Circle) and turns south east of Erin Mills Parkway, where it narrows to two lanes and ends as a cul-de-sac.

=== Bristol Road ===
Bristol Road
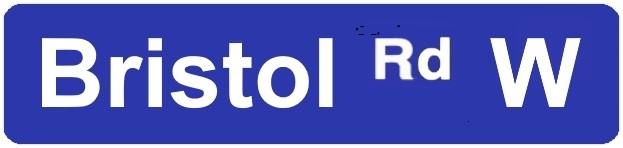
- Location: Credit River — Kennedy Rd. (continues west as Main St.)

Bristol Road begins at the Credit River as a continuation of Main Street in Streetsville and continues east to Kennedy Rd. The westernmost section was an historic minor route running east from the former village. The rest of the street was built, beginning in the vicinity of Hurontario St. in the late 1980s, and reached its full length by the late 1990s.

=== The Collegeway ===
The Collegeway
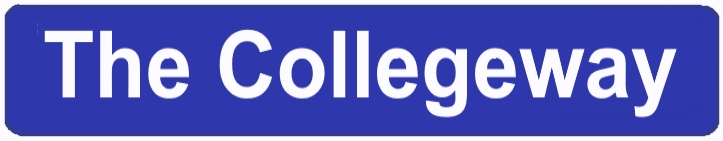
- Location: Laird Rd. - UTM

The Collegeway begins on the campus grounds of the University of Toronto Mississauga (formerly known as Erindale College, hence its name) and wends its way west through Erin Mills to Laird Road ending just before Highway 403. It runs between Dundas St. and Burnhamthorpe Rd. and intersects with major arterial roads such as Mississauga Rd, Erin Mills Pkwy, and Winston Churchill Blvd. The road traverses mainly residential area, but does pass notable non-residential zones like the University, the South Common Centre shopping mall and industrial area west of Ridgeway Drive towards Laird Rd.

=== Duke of York Boulevard ===
Duke of York Boulevard
- Location: Webb Dr. - Centre View Dr.

Duke of York Boulevard is a major north-south street in the Mississauga City Centre, serving as a central drag in the downtown core with more of a pedestrian focus, relative to the more peripheral Confederation and Hurontario. Both Square One Mall and the Mississauga City Centre Transit Terminal are situated shortly to the street's east. The street was named after disgraced former Prince of the Commonwealth realm Andrew Mountbatten-Windsor in 1989, although in 2025 any official affiliation with him was removed.

=== Meadowvale Boulevard ===
Meadowvale Boulevard
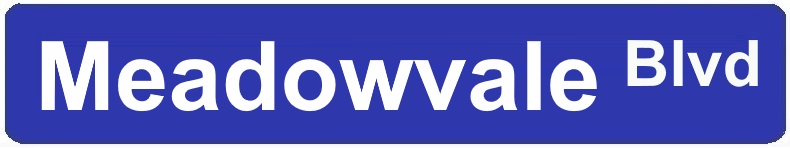
- Location: Derry Rd. - North city limits (continues south as Creditview Rd.; north as Heritage Rd. into Brampton)

Meadowvale Boulevard begins at Derry Rd. and is a continuation of Creditview Rd. It runs northwest and crosses Mississauga Rd., where it dips to the southwest to parallel Hwy. 401. It then turns sharply to the north to follow the former Fifth Line alignment (also followed by Erin Mills Pkwy. further south), into Brampton as Heritage Road. The road originally ran only to Mississauga Rd., but was extended to connect with Creditview Rd. when the latter was realigned concurrent with the construction of the new Derry Rd.

=== Ridgeway Drive ===
Ridgeway Drive
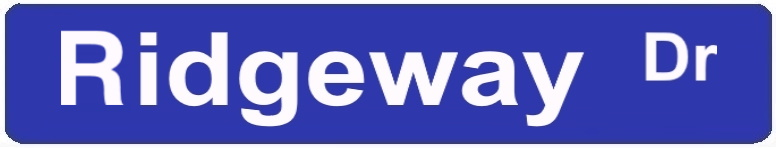
- Location: Dundas St. - Eglinton Ave. (continues south as Winston Park Dr. into Oakville)

Ridgeway Drive runs north off Dundas St. west of Winston Churchill Blvd. and ends at Eglinton Ave. The road originally ended at Unity Drive/Sladeview Crescent, but was later bridged over Highway 403 to reach Eglinton Ave. Ridgeway was proposed to be the western terminus of the Mississauga Transitway, but the busway was only constructed as far west as Winston Churchill Blvd.

=== Tenth Line West ===
Tenth Line West
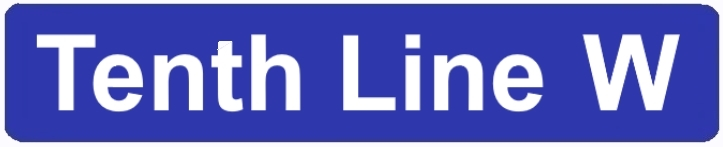
- Location: Eglinton Ave. - Dead end at Hwy. 401

Tenth Line West (or simply Tenth Line) runs north from Eglinton Ave. through Churchill Meadows and the boundary between the Lisgar and Meadowvale neighbourhoods and ends at a dead end at Highway 401. Like Ninth Line, it was once entirely in Halton Region but has been wholly within Mississauga after the 1974 annexation of lands west of Winston Churchill Blvd. Unlike Ninth Line, Tenth Line bears a "West" designation, despite neither road ever having such previously in Halton (due to the numbering sequence only being counted eastwards from the baseline) as well as actually being the seventh concession road west of Hurontario St. based on Mississauga's survey grid. An unusual planning aspect along the street is the presence of a series of unnamed cul-de-sacs, each contained six homes, running off the west side of the street north of Britannia Road, in the Trelawny neighbourhood.

=== Terry Fox Way ===
Terry Fox Way
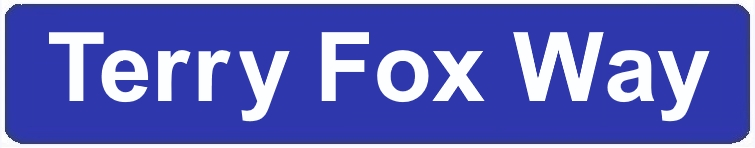
- Location: Eglinton Ave. - Britannia Rd. (continues as Silken Laumann Way)

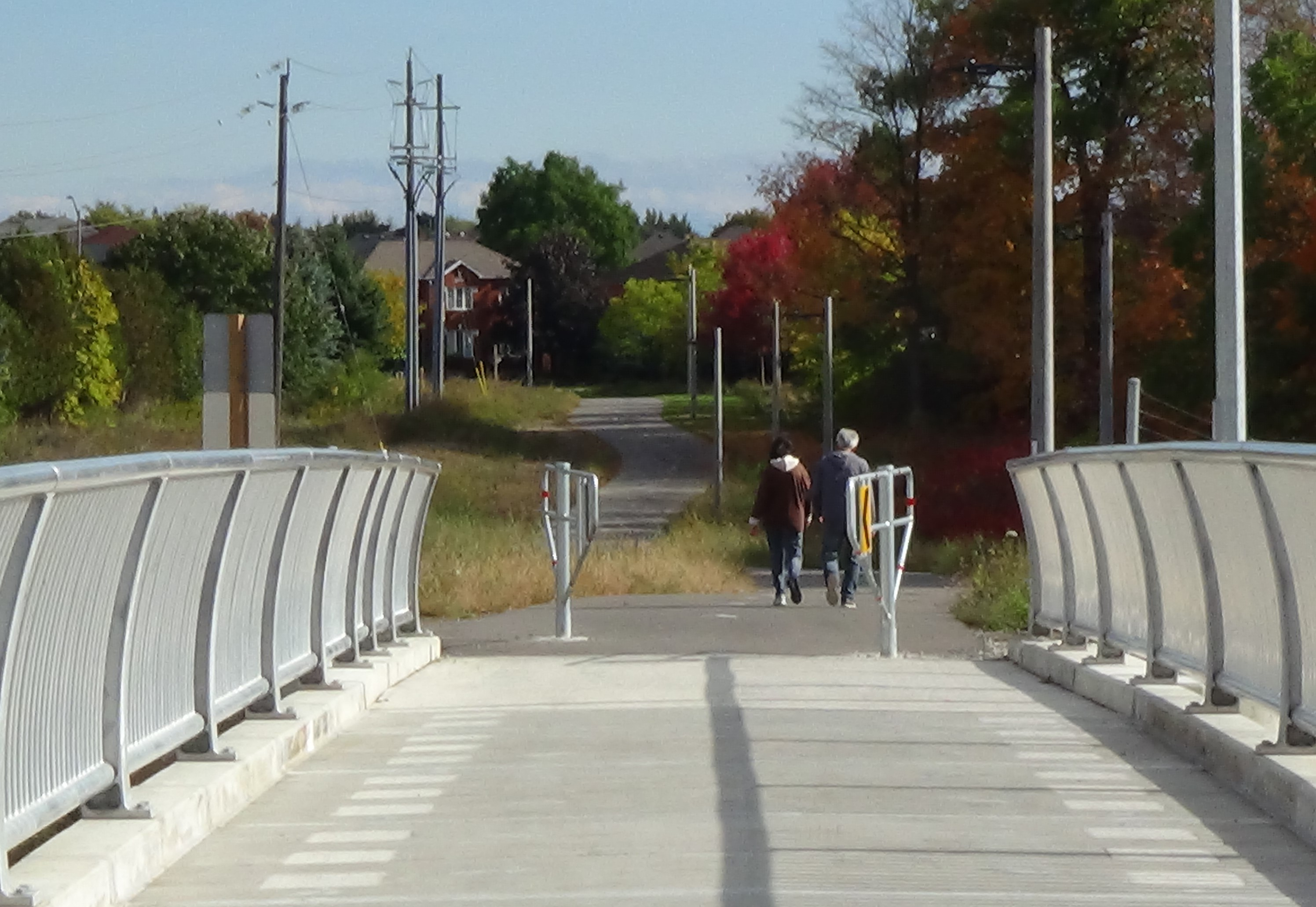
Looking along the pedestrian bridge across Hwy. 401 to the pathway along the former 2nd Line alignment

Terry Fox Way (along with Silken Laumann Way) was formerly the part of Second Line West from Eglinton Ave. to north of Britannia Rd., after Second Line was broken up into segments after the construction of the northern section of Mavis Rd. Two other sections of Second Line south of Highway 401 are incorporated into portions of minor side streets. Second Line still exists in name north of the 401, and until 2016, crossed the freeway until the overpass was demolished for a highway widening project. A pedestrian bridge was constructed to replace the original structure, which opened in 2020. On October 19, 2021, the replacement bridge was struck by a dump truck with the box tilted up, causing minor damage to the structure.

The street is named after the late Terry Fox, the amputee who (with a prosthetic leg) attempted to run across Canada to raise money for cancer research, but was forced to abandon the run halfway through after his cancer returned. It was originally proposed to be named "Gandhi Way" after the Indian human rights activist Mahatma Gandhi, but that name was rejected due to public opposition.

=== Thomas Street ===
Thomas Street
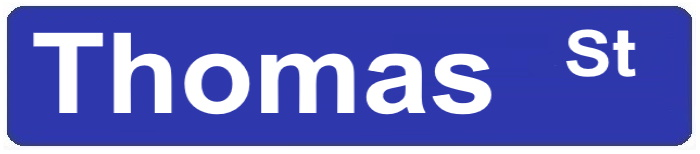
- Location: Ninth Line — Queen St. (Mississauga Rd.)

Thomas Street runs west from Queen St. (Mississauga Rd.) in Streetsville, and ends at Ninth Line. The section east of Winston Churchill Blvd. is a historic rural road leading west from the former town, but the street was extended west to Ninth Line in the mid 1990s with the development of the Churchill Meadows neighbourhood. As is the case with Erin Mills Parkway, it also originally followed a section of the present Turney Drive.

== Other historically notable roads ==
=== Indian Line ===
Indian Line is a short industrial side street running north from Campus Road, fronting Highway 427. It is all that remains of what was originally a long road that served as the divider between the historic Peel and York counties, and later also Metropolitan Toronto, and got its name as it ran along the western boundary of the 1787 Toronto Purchase from the Mississauga First Nation by the British. It ran north from present-day Eglinton Ave. to Bolton and beyond. The section forming Mississauga's eastern border was later mostly reconstructed into the 427 as well as a section of Renforth Drive; the portions farther north were incorporated into Highway 50, with the present remaining section retained to maintain access to driveways.

=== Sherway Drive ===
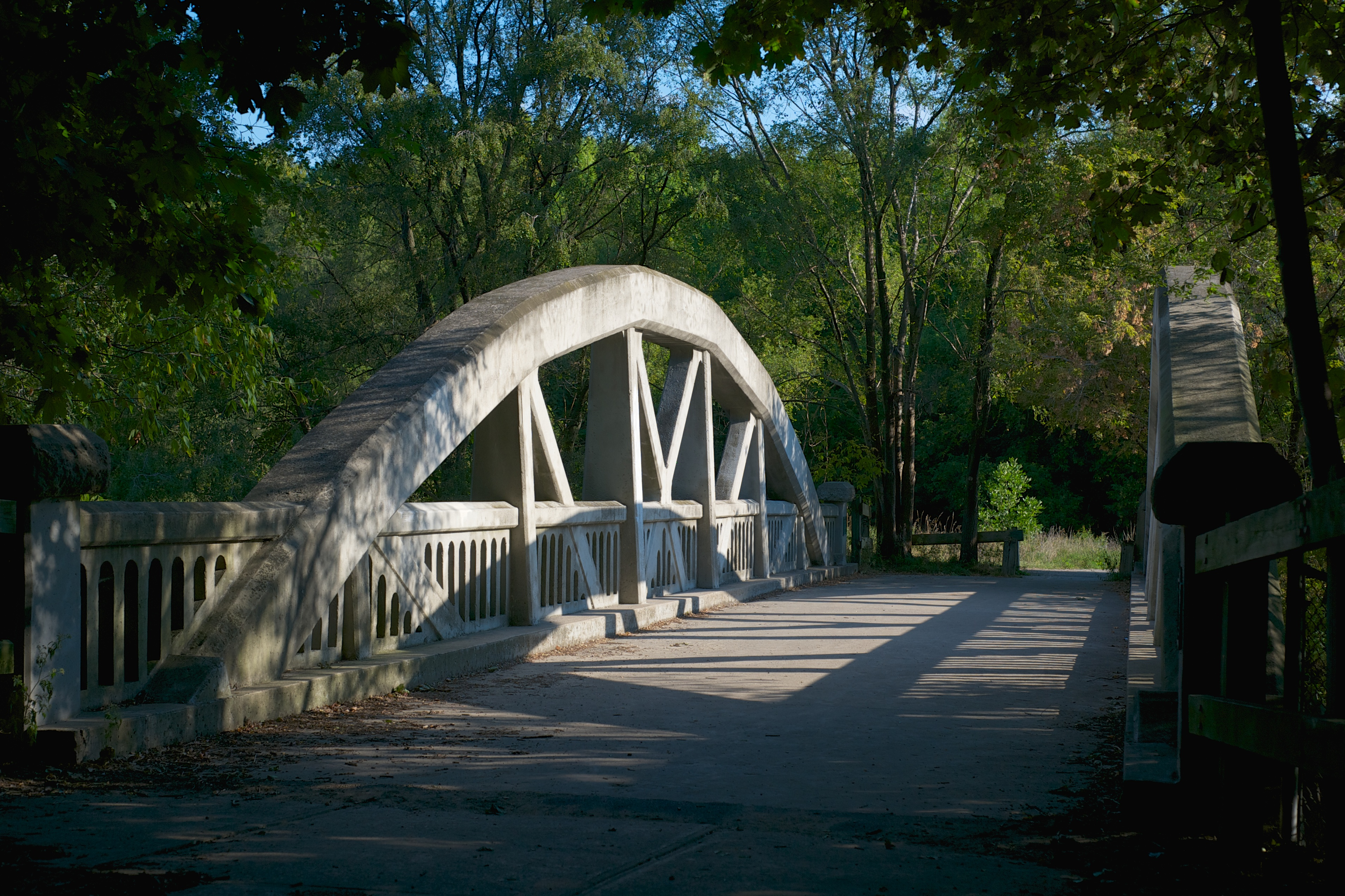
Middle Road Bridge

Sherway Drive is a residential street in the southeast area of the city, running east off Dixie Rd to the Etobicoke Creek. It was once part of the course of The Middle Road, which later became the QEW. It is noted for the concrete bowstring bridge that crosses the creek. The bridge is named the Middle Road Bridge (also known as the Sherway Drive Bridge), and was built in 1908, and carried only one lane of traffic, and today is strictly a pedestrian crossing. The street continues on the Toronto side of the creek and is also a minor side street on which the Queensway Health Centre is located.

== Provincially maintained highways ==
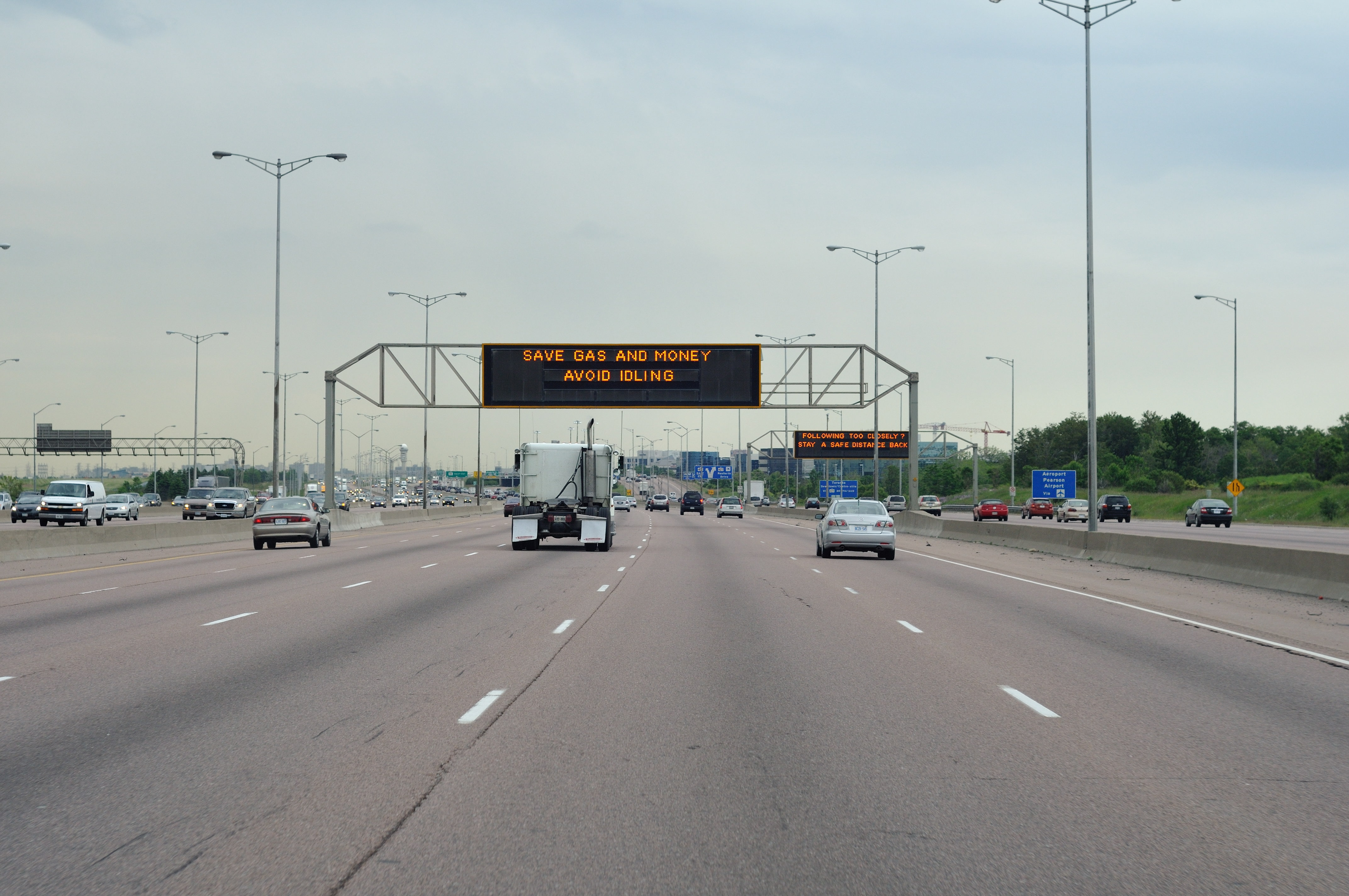
With 18 lanes, 401 in Mississauga near Pearson Airport is one of the world's widest and busiest freeways

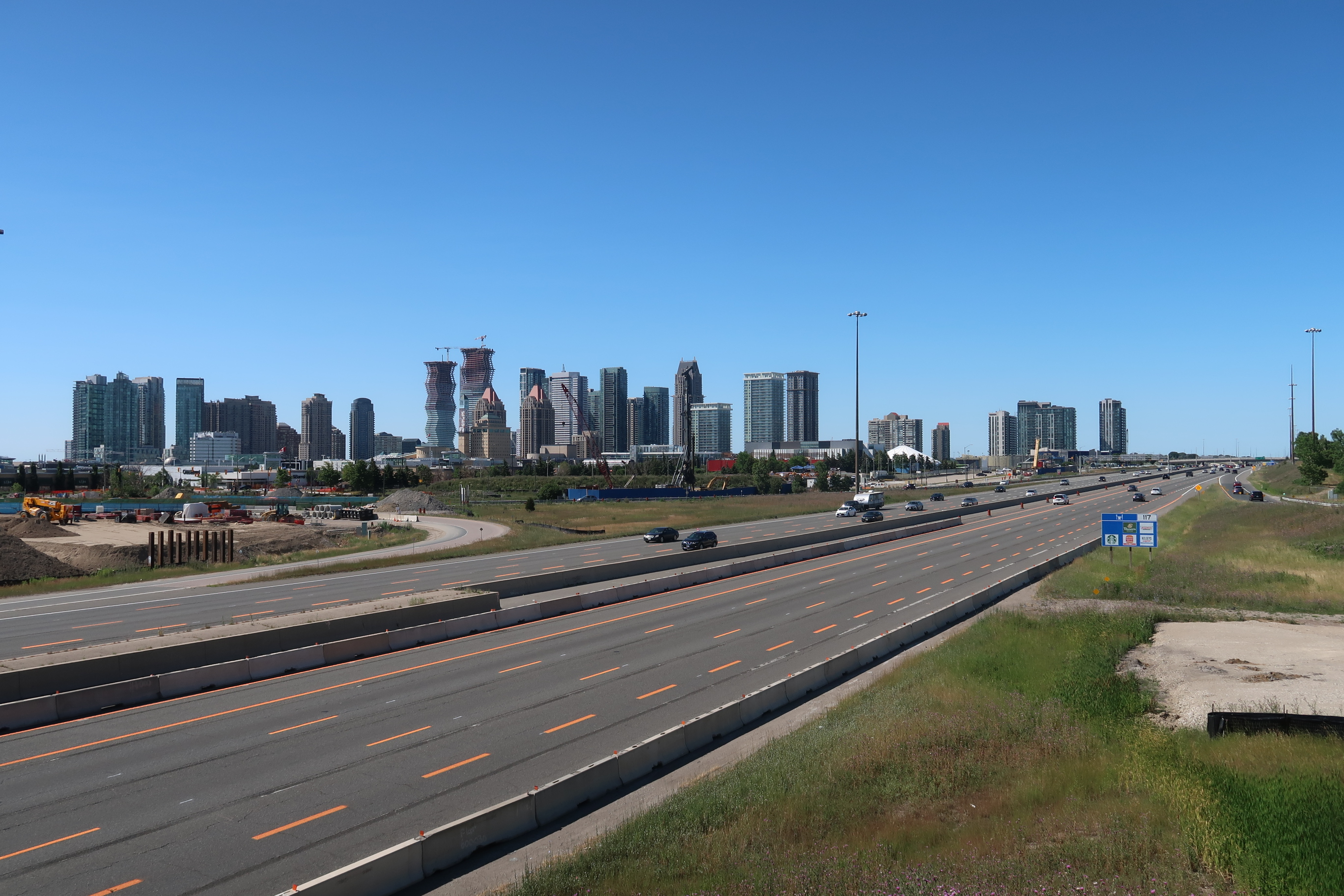
Highway 403 near Mississauga City Centre

There are five provincially maintained highways that interchange with roads in Mississauga:

- Queen Elizabeth Way
- Highway 401
- Highway 403
- Highway 410
- Highway 427 - only section north of Airport Road to Finch Avenue are within Peel

There are two other 400-series roads not fully maintained by the province for the portions within Mississauga:

- Highway 407 is the only privately owned highway in Mississauga and not maintained by the MTO.
- Highway 409 is partially located in Mississauga (namely west of Highway 427) and is maintained by the Greater Toronto Airport Authority since 2000. Sections east of Highway 427 are in Toronto and still maintained by the MTO.

== See also ==
- List of numbered roads in Peel Region
- List of roads in Brampton: For descriptions of northward continuations of various north-south roads within that city.
