= Windsor Street (Vancouver) =

Bike path in Vancouver, Canada

Windsor Way is a bike-path in East Vancouver, Canada.

== Route ==
Windsor Street provides a north-south connection between Great Northern Way and the Midtown/ Ridgeway Greenway and the Inverness Bike Route.

Measures along the proposed bikeway to reduce vehicle speeds and to help cyclists cross busy arterials include traffic circles, corner bulges, centre medians, speed humps, and traffic lights crontrolled by cyclists and pedestrians.
