= 504 Züm Chinguacousy =

Future bus rapid transit line in Brampton, Ontario, Canada

504

Overview
- System: Züm
- Operator: Brampton Transit
- Status: Under construction

Route
- Communities served: Brampton
- Start: Sandalwood Parkway
- Via: Steeles Avenue and Chinguacousy Road
- End: Bramalea GO Station
- Stops: 18

504 Züm Chinguacousy is a bus rapid transit route that is under construction in Brampton, Ontario, Canada, that will be part of the Züm network.

The route will operate between Bramalea GO Station, travelling west along Steeles Avenue before heading north on Chinguacousy Road and terminating at Sandalwood Parkway.

The route is scheduled to launch with the opening of the Hurontario LRT. Upon opening, 504 Züm Chinguacousy will replace Route 104 Chinguacousy Express, one of Brampton Transit's three express routes. Route 4 Chinguacousy serves as one of the busiest transit routes in Brampton, and the introduction of bus rapid transit service is intended to accommodate increased ridership demand along the Chinguacousy Road corridor. Construction is also upgrading cycling infrastructure along the corridor to promote active transportation.

== Stops ==
504 Chinguacousy
Name	Local parallel routes	Connections
Bramalea GO Station	511, 11/11A Steeles, 301 Westcreek Employment Shuttle	GO Transit Kitchener line GO Transit bus services MiWay
Dixie	511, 11/11A Steeles, 301 Westcreek Employment Shuttle	
West Drive / Tomken	511, 11/11A Steeles	
Rutherford / First Gulf	511, 11/11A Steeles	GO Transit GO Transit bus services
Kennedy	511, 11/11A Steeles	GO Transit GO Transit bus services
Brampton Gateway Terminal	511, 3/3A McLaughlin, 4/4C Chinguacousy, 11/11A Steeles, 51 Hereford, 53 Ray Lawson, 56 Kingknoll, 57 McMurchy	502
McMurchy	511, 3/3A McLaughlin, 4/4C Chinguacousy, 11/11A Steeles, 51 Hereford, 53 Ray Lawson, 56 Kingknoll, 57 McMurchy	
Sheridan College Terminal	511, 3/3A McLaughlin, 4/4C Chinguacousy, 11 Steeles, 51 Hereford, 53 Ray Lawson, 56 Kingknoll	MiWay
Steeles	511, 4/4C Chinguacousy, 11 Steeles, 51 Hereford	
Charolais	4/4C Chinguacousy	
Dusk / Drinkwater	4/4C Chinguacousy	
Bonnie Braes / Sterritt	4/4C Chinguacousy	
Queen	4/4C Chinguacousy	561
Valleyway / Major William Sharpe	4/4C Chinguacousy	1A, 57
Williams	4/4C Chinguacousy	29
Bovaird	4/4C Chinguacousy	505
Fairhill / Duffield	4/4C Chinguacousy	
Sandalwood Parkway	4/4C Chinguacousy	23

== See also ==
- Brampton Transit
- Züm
- Hurontario LRT
