= Humber College station =

Toronto subway station

Humber College
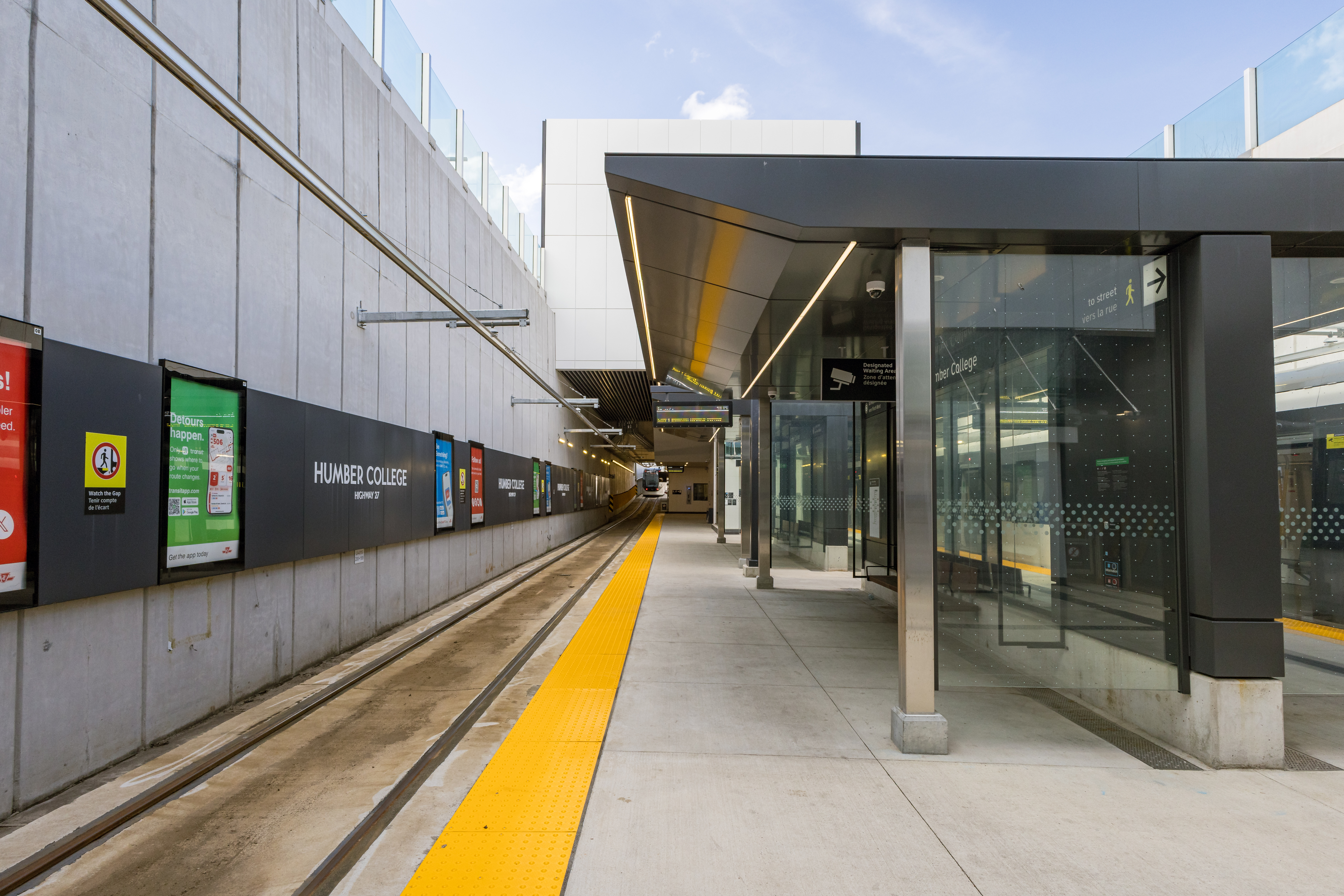
- Humber College station platform

General information
- Location: 145 Humber College Boulevard; Toronto, Ontario; Canada
- Coordinates: 43.7299°N 79.6017°W
- Owner: Metrolinx
- Platforms: Centre platform
- Tracks: 2 platform tracks
- Connections: TTC buses; Brampton Transit; MiWay; York Region Transit

Construction
- Structure type: Below-grade
- Accessible: Yes

Other information
- Status: Open

History
- Opened: December 7, 2025; 11 months ago

Services
Preceding station	Toronto Transit Commission	Following station
Terminus	Line 6 Finch West	Westmore towards Finch West
Location

Humber College is a Toronto subway station on Line 6 Finch West, in Toronto, Ontario, Canada. It is located at the southwest corner of Highway 27 and Humber College Boulevard on the north campus of Humber Polytechnic in the Etobicoke district of Toronto, and is the western terminus of the line. A walkway connects the station to the Humber College Bus Terminal. The station retained its planned name after Humber College rebranded to Humber Polytechnic.

== Description ==
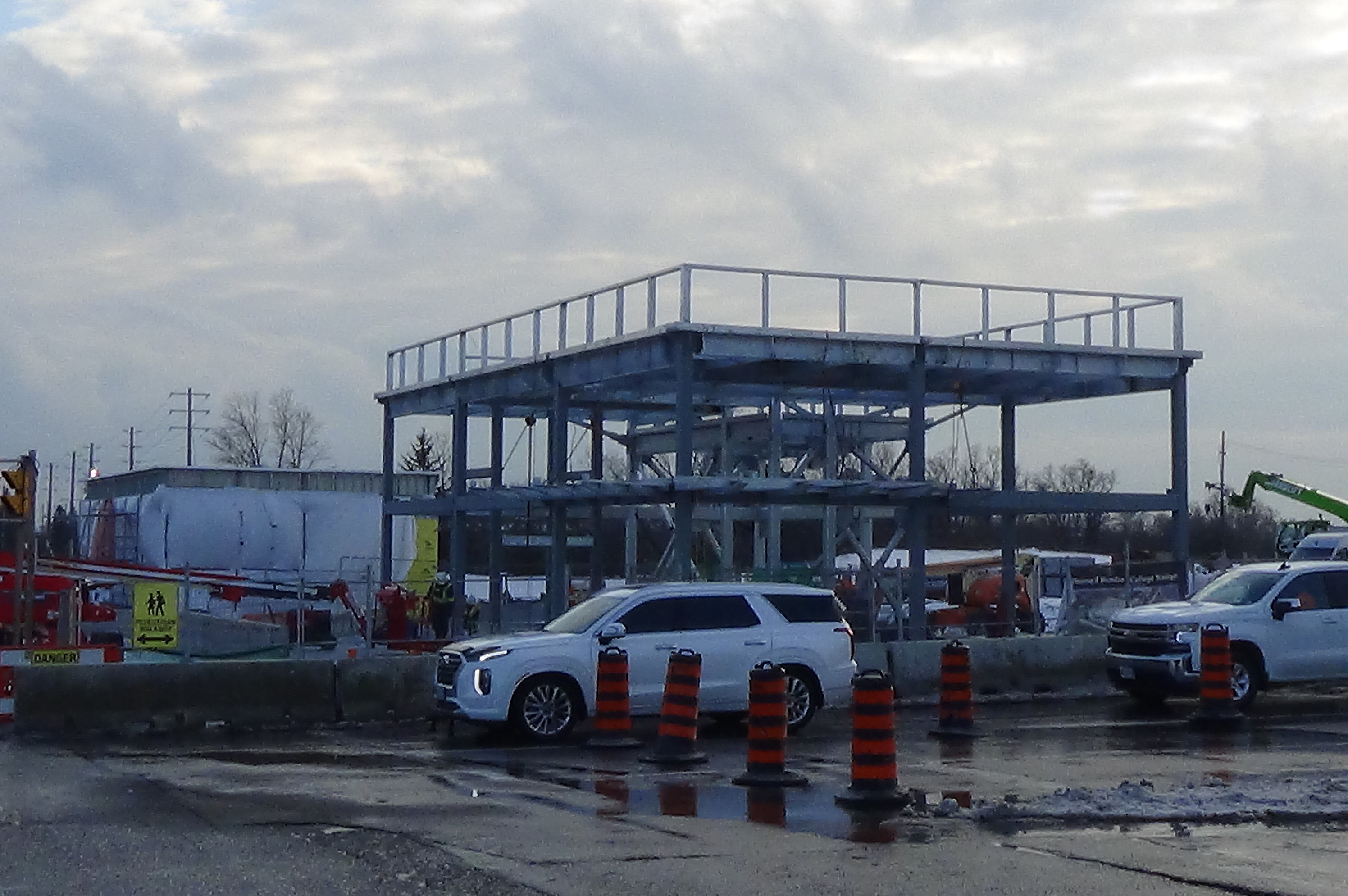
The station under construction in December 2022

The station is located below street level parallel to Highway 27, with the central part of the island platform in an open trench and both ends partly underneath the two entrance buildings: one on the south side of Humber College Boulevard and the second on the north side of President's Way, a new access road flanked by an exterior walkway with a 200-metre (660 ft) canopy that links the station to the Humber College Bus Terminal and the Humber Polytechnic campus. The lack of a roof over the trench allows natural light to reach the platform, and the open section of the platform has several canopies for weather protection. The station has a bike room to accommodate 40 bicycles, two elevators for accessibility, Wi-Fi, and washrooms.

Besides Humber Polytechnic, the station also serves Etobicoke General Hospital located at the southeast corner of Humber College Boulevard and Highway 27.

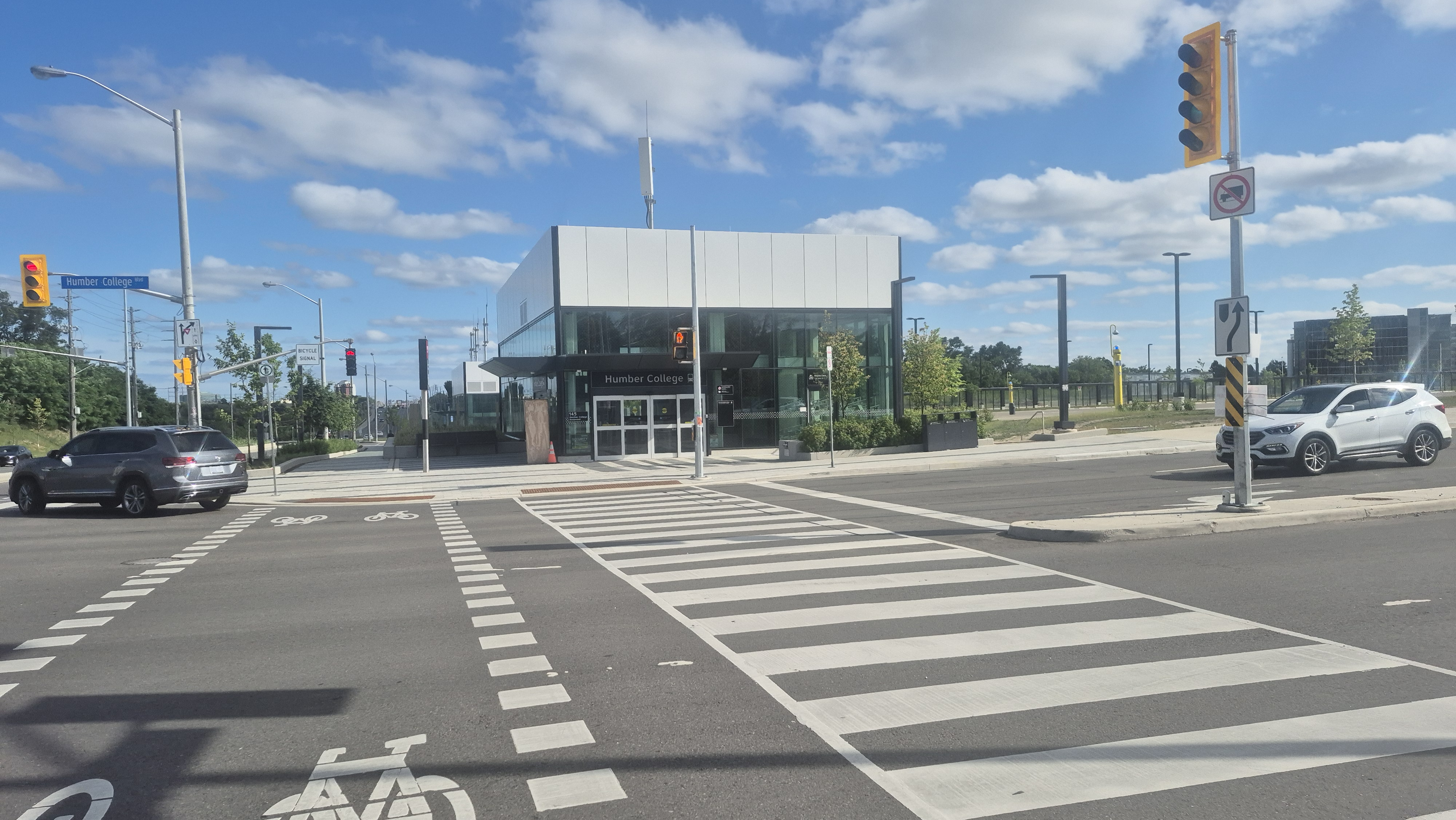
North entrance at Humber College Boulevard prior to opening (July 2025)

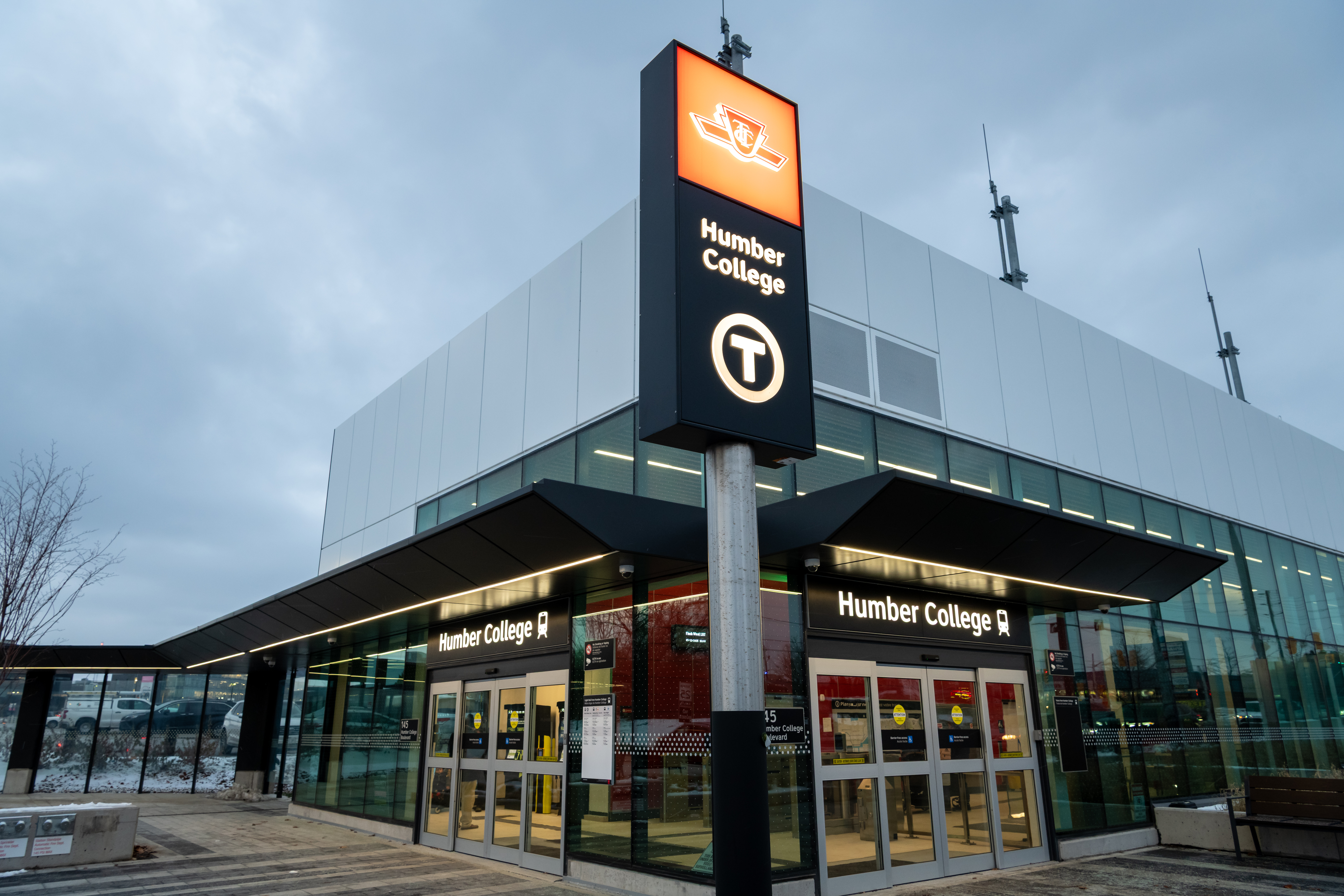
The south entrance, which leads to and from the Humber College Bus Terminal

== LRT infrastructure in the vicinity ==
North of the station, the line runs in a trench beside Highway 27, rising partway to surface level to a flat section where a pair of single crossovers to reverse light rail vehicles (LRVs) are located. It then dips back down until Finch Avenue West, where it enters a short tunnel and curves 90° east under the intersection. After exiting the tunnel, it rises to the surface to begin its run along the centre of Finch. There are also tail tracks south of the platform for overnight storage for two LRVs.

== Humber College Bus Terminal ==
Unlike other TTC stations with terminals connecting to surface routes, Humber College station does not have an attached bus terminal within the station itself but connects with the pre-existing Humber College Bus Terminal, which opened in 2015. The terminal is located on the Humber Polytechnic North Campus, approximately 300 metres (980 ft) west of the LRT station and thus is not within its fare-paid area. Along with TTC buses, the terminal is served by MiWay, Brampton Transit (which includes Züm), GO Transit and York Region Transit.

The bus terminal is bounded by the Barrett Centre for Technology Innovation to the south, Aboretum Boulevard to the east, Spruce Vista on the north side and Silver Bell Lane on the west side. The terminal has 10 bus bays: 6 bays are along an island platform on the south side of Spruce Vista, 3 bays are along a side platform next to the Barrett Centre, and 1 platform is on the west side of Silver Bell Lane. Platforms have waiting shelters and next bus displays.

=== TTC buses ===
The TTC bus routes serving the terminal are:

Route	Name	Additional information
37A	Islington	Southbound to Islington Station via Woodbine Racetrack and Rexdale Boulevard
96AD	Wilson	Northbound via Carrier Drive; eastbound to York Mills station via John Garland Boulevard and Kipling Avenue
96B	Wilson	Northbound to Albion Road via Humberline Drive; eastbound to York Mills station via Martin Grove Road and Westhumber Boulevard
906	Airport – Humber College Express	Westbound to Humberwood Loop; southbound to Pearson Airport (Viscount Terminal Link station)
927B	Highway 27 Express	Northbound to Steeles Avenue West; southbound to Kipling station
927D	Highway 27 Express	Northbound to Steeles Avenue West and Signal Hill Avenue via Royalcrest Road; southbound to Kipling station
996	Wilson Express	Westbound to Humberwood Loop; eastbound to Scarborough Centre station via Wilson station and York Mills station

=== Regional buses ===
The following regional bus routes serve the terminal:

Agency	Route	Name	Additional information
Brampton Transit (includes Züm)	11	Steeles	To Lisgar GO Station via Brampton Gateway Terminal
Brampton Transit (includes Züm)	11A	Steeles	To Brampton Gateway Terminal
Brampton Transit (includes Züm)	50	Gore Road	To Gore Meadows Community Centre
Brampton Transit (includes Züm)	50A	Gore Road	To Squire Ellis Drive (limited service)
Brampton Transit (includes Züm)	511	Züm Steeles	To Lisgar GO Station via Brampton Gateway Terminal (bus rapid transit route)
Brampton Transit (includes Züm)	511C	Züm Steeles	To Sheridan College via Brampton Gateway Terminal (bus rapid transit route)
GO Transit	40H, 40M	Hamilton / Richmond Hill	Eastbound to Highway 407 Bus Terminal (weekdays only)
GO Transit	40H, 40M	Hamilton / Richmond Hill	Westbound to Hamilton GO Centre via Pearson Airport Terminal 1 (weekdays only)
MiWay	22	Finch	Westbound to Westwood Square Bus Terminal
MiWay	107	Malton Express	Westbound to Mississauga City Centre Transit Terminal
York Region Transit	7	Martin Grove	Northbound to Al Palladini Community Centre
York Region Transit	13	Islington	Northbound to Kleinburg (weekdays only)
