= Brampton Gateway Terminal =

Bus station in Ontario, Canada

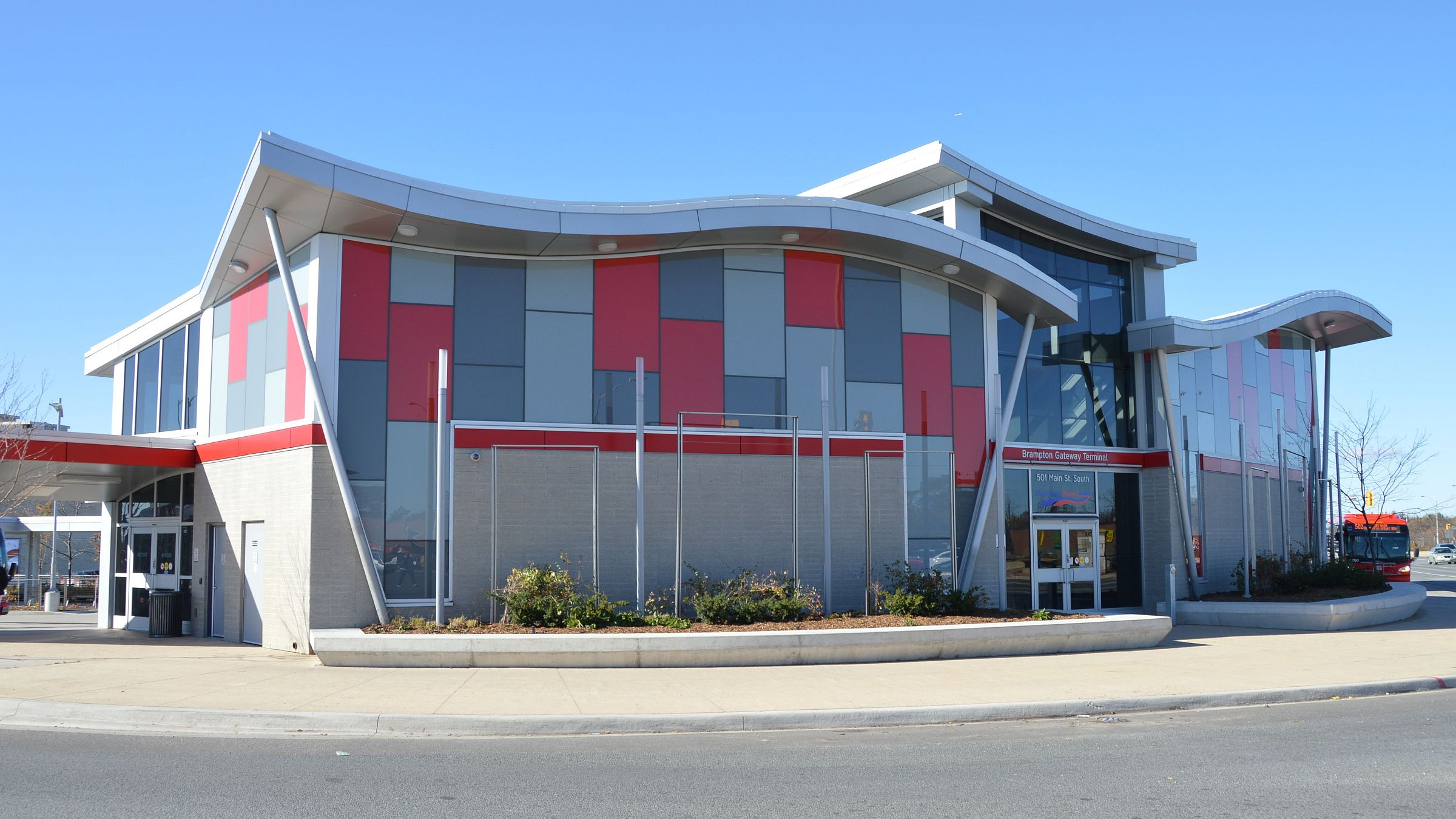

General information
- Location: 501 Main Street South, Brampton, Ontario; Canada
- Coordinates: 43°39′57″N 79°44′01″W
- Owner: City of Brampton
- Bus stands: 17
- Bus operators: Brampton Transit; MiWay

Construction
- Structure type: Terminal building with an enclosed waiting area
- Cycle facilities: Rack and shelter
- Accessible: yes

History
- Opened: November 26, 2012; 13 years ago (bus service); TBD (Hurontario LRT)

Future services
Preceding station	Metrolinx	Following station
Terminus	Hurontario LRT	County Court toward Port Credit
Location

Brampton Gateway Terminal is a Brampton Transit and MiWay bus station serving the south-central and western areas of Brampton, Ontario. It is located on the north-west corner of Steeles Avenue and Main Street adjoining the Shoppers World Brampton shopping centre. The terminal opened on November 26, 2012 to replace the Shoppers World Terminal on the south-west side of the shopping centre.

== History ==
In 2009, the manager of Land Use Policy recommended that, with the addition of Acceleride (later Züm) and a proposed Hurontario–Main LRT, there was a "demonstrated need" to move the terminal to the corner of Hurontario and Steeles. Such a move would allow less diversion time from the route to the station, and for a larger station.

As a stop on the potential LRT, the terminal is considered part of the Hurontario Higher Order Transit corridor. Expropriations were made to allow for the terminal to be moved; this stands in contrast to the previous location which was leased from Shoppers World Brampton. As of spring 2010, the terminal redesign and relocation was scheduled to coincide with the Zum Main Street launch in fall 2011; it was listed as a 2011 service initiative in the agency's 2011 Current and Capital Budget.

A contract for the construction of the new terminal, its amenities, plus road and intersection improvements was awarded to Graham Construction and Engineering. The lowest tender, the contract was worth $10,190,340. Earlier estimates presumed an $8.3 million cost. A City report placed the "higher actual costs" on a limited construction time-line and tendering the contract during the summer.

The bus station will be the northern terminus of the Hurontario LRT which extends south to Port Credit GO Station in Mississauga. The light rail line is scheduled for completion in 2024.

== Routes ==
This terminal has 15 bus bays with several of them being on the streets.

Legend
2	Regular service
103	Miway
104	Express service
502	Züm

Route		Direction	Destination	Destination	Bay
2	Main	NB	Downtown Brampton Terminal	Heart Lake Terminal	9
2	Main	SB	Hurontario and 407 GO Park and Ride		13
3	McLaughlin	NB	Sandalwood Loop		6
3A	McLaughlin	NB	Flower City Community Campus	Sandalwood Loop	6
4	Chinguacousy	NB	Sheridan College	Clockwork Drive	3
4C	Chinguacousy	NB	Sheridan College	Mount Pleasant GO Station	3
8	Centre	EB	Peel Memorial Centre for Integrated Health and Wellness	Bramalea Terminal	12
11	Steeles	WB	Sheridan College	Lisgar GO Station	1
11D	Steeles	WB	Sheridan College	Lisgar GO Station	1
11	Steeles	EB	Bramalea GO Station	Humber College	7
11A	Steeles	EB	Bramalea GO Station	Humber College	7
11D	Steeles	EB	Bramalea GO Station	Humber College	7
52	McMurchy	NB	Downtown Brampton Terminal		11
53	Ray Lawson	WB	Sheridan College	James Potter Road	2
53A	Ray Lawson	WB	Sheridan College	Creditview Road/Bonnie Braes Drive	2
54	County Court	CW	County Court Boulevard	Sheridan College	12
57	Charolais	NB	Flower City Community Campus	Major William Sharpe Drive	5
103	Hurontario Express	SB	Mississauga City Centre Transit Terminal	Trillium Health Centre	15
104	Chinguacousy Express	NB	Sheridan College	Mount Pleasant GO Station	3
199	UTM Express	SB	University of Toronto Mississauga		12
502	Züm Main	NB	Downtown Brampton Terminal	Sandalwood Loop	10
502	Züm Main	SB	Highway 407 Go Park & Ride	Mississauga City Centre Terminal	14
511	Züm Steeles	EB	Bramalea GO Station	Humber College	8
511C	Züm Steeles	EB	Bramalea GO Station	Humber College	8
511	Züm Steeles	WB	Sheridan College	Lisgar GO Station	1
511C	Züm Steeles	WB	Sheridan College		1
