= Brampton Transit =

Public transport bus operator for Brampton, Ontario

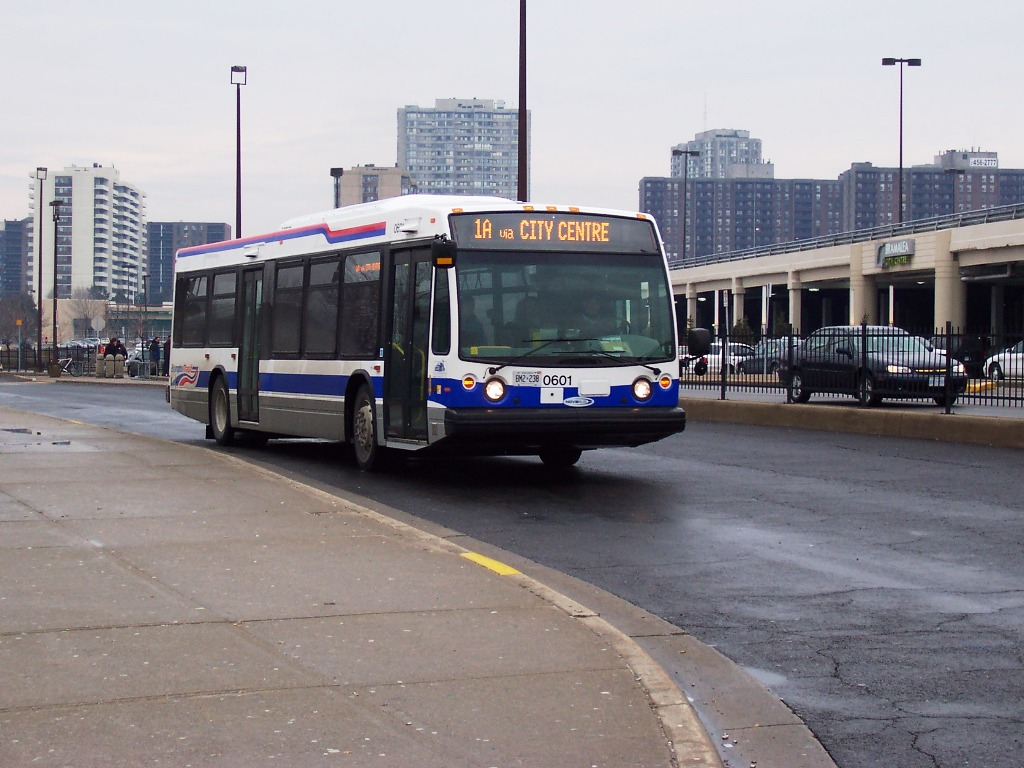
- Brampton Transit Nova Bus LFS in the old Bramalea City Centre terminal in 2006
- Parent: City of Brampton
- Founded: 1974; 52 years ago
- Headquarters: 185 Clark Boulevard; Brampton, Ontario
- Locale: Brampton, Ontario
- Service area: Greater Toronto Area
- Service type: Public transit
- Routes: 51
- Depots: 2
- Fleet: 422
- Daily ridership: 107,500 (weekdays, Q2 2026)
- Annual ridership: 37,907,698 (2025)
- General manager: Heidi Dempster
- Website: brampton.ca/en/residents/transit

Brampton Transit (BT) is a public transport bus operator for the City of Brampton in the Regional Municipality of Peel, and within the Greater Toronto Area (GTA) in Ontario, Canada. Brampton Transit began operations in 1974. In 2025, the system had a ridership of 49,200,800, or about 107,500 per weekday as of the second quarter of 2026.

Züm, a series of bus rapid transit routes running along various major roads within Brampton, was introduced in 2010. All Züm routes (with the exception of one) continue into neighbouring municipalities, namely Mississauga, Vaughan, and Toronto (Humber College Bus Terminal).

== Connections ==
Brampton Transit is connected with Mississauga's MiWay to the south, Milton Transit to the west, Toronto Transit Commission (TTC) to the southeast and York Region Transit (YRT) to the east. The Züm network directly connects to these neighbouring transit agencies, in some cases overlapping with their routes for considerable distances. This includes the 501 Züm Queen in Vaughan running alongside Viva Orange from Highway 50 east to Vaughan Metropolitan Centre subway station, 502 Züm Main running alongside 103 Hurontario Express from Highway 407 south to Mississauga City Centre Transit Terminal (next to Square One Shopping Centre) and 505 Züm Bovaird (both into Mississauga) running alongside MiWay and TTC routes to Pearson's Viscount Terminal Link station or into Toronto.

Most major north-south conventional routes connect to MiWay, primarily beginning or ending their route at or near Derry Road in Mississauga. As with some routes on the Züm network, a few conventional routes also overlap further south into Mississauga providing additional or integrated service alongside MiWay from the same street coming from Brampton. Examples include the 7/7A Kennedy looping via Courtneypark Drive, 30 Airport Rd and 14 Torbram terminating at Westwood Square, and 18 Dixie looping via Courtneypark Drive, Tomken Road, and Meyerside Drive.

Steeles Avenue is a major thoroughfare across the south end of the city. Route 11 Steeles runs from west of Brampton Gateway at Hurontario Street, and eastward into Toronto to Humber College Bus Terminal at Humber College's North Campus. There is a transfer at the college with Route 50/50A Gore Road, that serves developments in The Gore Road area near the former Highway 50 and Albion Road. In September 2007, the western part of the route was cut back to Brampton Gateway and replaced with Route 51 Hereford. However in March 2025, the 11 Steeles got a massive service improvement on the section between Lisgar GO and the Brampton Gateway Terminal, with all day frequencies of at least 30-35 min on weekdays, and 40-45 mins on weekends. It connects with Miway at Mississauga Road and Meadowvale Boulevard. The 511 Züm Steeles route serves the entire length of Steeles through the city, from Humber College Bus Terminal to Lisgar GO station in Mississauga. It is the only Brampton Transit route to have both its endpoints outside Brampton.

Four routes run north into Caledon to provide service to urbanized areas bordering Brampton as well as the community of Bolton in the otherwise rural municipality.This includes Route 41, which replaced the former Bolton line bus route which was operated by Voyago until May 2024.

Brampton Transit carries riders to and from the three Kitchener line commuter rail stations operated by GO Transit in the city; Bramalea, Brampton, and Mount Pleasant, where connections to GO buses can be made. GO buses also make an on-street connections at Brampton Gateway Terminal, and serves shopping centres such as Bramalea City Centre and Trinity Common. GO is an interregional agency that provides higher-order transit links Brampton to Toronto and other cities in the Golden Horseshoe.

== Fares ==
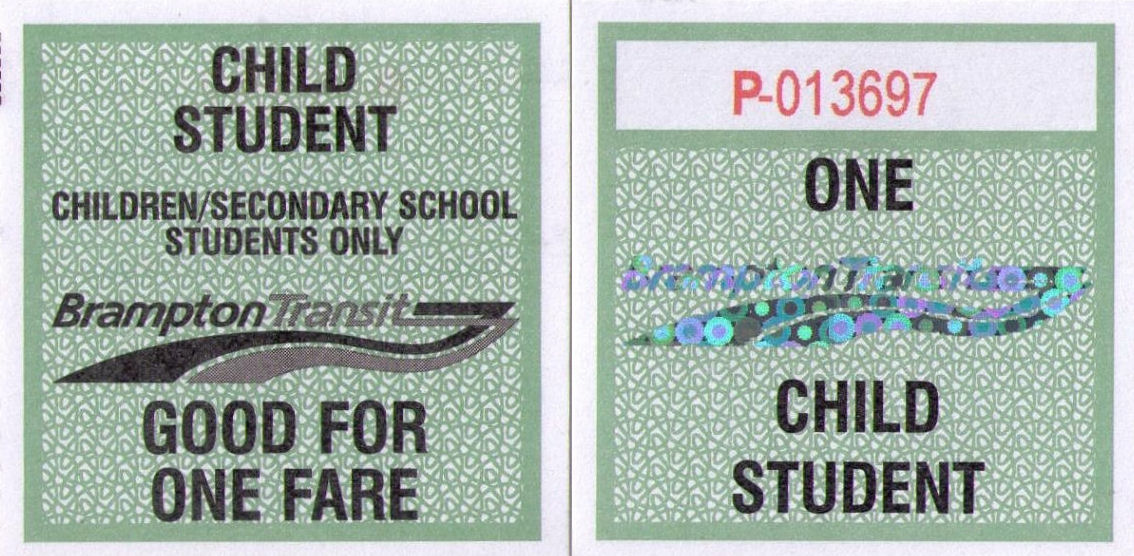
2008 Children/Student 10 ticket

Fares are as of February 9, 2026. The cash fare is $4.75.

Customers paying their bus fares with cash (and in some cases, special purpose paper tickets) may request a paper transfer from the bus driver; for customers using Presto cards, the transfer is applied automatically from initial tap on. Both are valid for two hours from the time of first boarding, which allows customers to transfer freely between Brampton Transit buses in any direction, as well as transferring to or from other neighbouring municipal transit agencies in the GTHA, such as Milton Transit, MiWay, Oakville Transit, and York Region Transit services.

Since February 26, 2024, there are also free transfers available between Brampton Transit and the TTC (separate fares were charged previously) for riders paying with Presto, credit, or debit cards. However, this does not apply to paper transfers, which still requires an additional fare to be paid.

Since August 11, 2022, customers also have the option to pay the equivalent of the Brampton Transit adult cash fare by contactless credit card, debit card or mobile wallet by tapping it on a Presto fare reader. Similar to the Presto card, the 2-hour transfer is applied automatically onto a customer's contactless credit or debit card or mobile wallet after the initial fare is paid.

Preschoolers (ages 5 and under), blind people and senior residents – who resides in the City of Brampton for those ages 65 and older so long as they carry a valid Brampton Transit Identification Card and a Presto card with a free annual pass loaded on it – can travel fare free on Brampton Transit. War veterans also travel for free by Veteran Transit Pass Program.

== Terminals ==
=== Brampton Gateway Terminal ===
The new terminal, located on the northwest corner of Steeles Avenue and Main Street, opened on 26 November 2012. replacing the Shoppers World Terminal.

=== Downtown Terminal ===
The Downtown Terminal consists of two platform areas. The first being the terminal itself just off of Main and Nelson which services routes such as:

- 501 Züm Queen
- 561 Züm Queen West
- 1/1A Queen
- 52 McMurchy

The second portion is the two Züm stops on opposite sides of Main street. These stops service routes:

- 502 Züm Main
- 2 Main
- 24 Van Kirk
- 25 Edenbrook

For GO bus and trains servicing Downtown Brampton Terminal, see Brampton GO Station

=== Heart Lake Terminal ===
Location: Conestoga Drive, NW of Sandalwood Parkway and Kennedy Road
Coordinates: 43°43′41″N 79°47′53″W
Opened: Unknown
Brampton routes: 2, 7/7A, 28/28A, 201, 202, 203, 204
Transit connections: None

=== Shoppers World Terminal ===
This terminal was replaced by Brampton Gateway Terminal, located on the northwest corner of Steeles Avenue and Main Street, on 26 November 2012. The old facility stands empty; it is to be demolished and the area to be used by Shoppers World Brampton as an additional parking lot.

=== GO Train stations ===
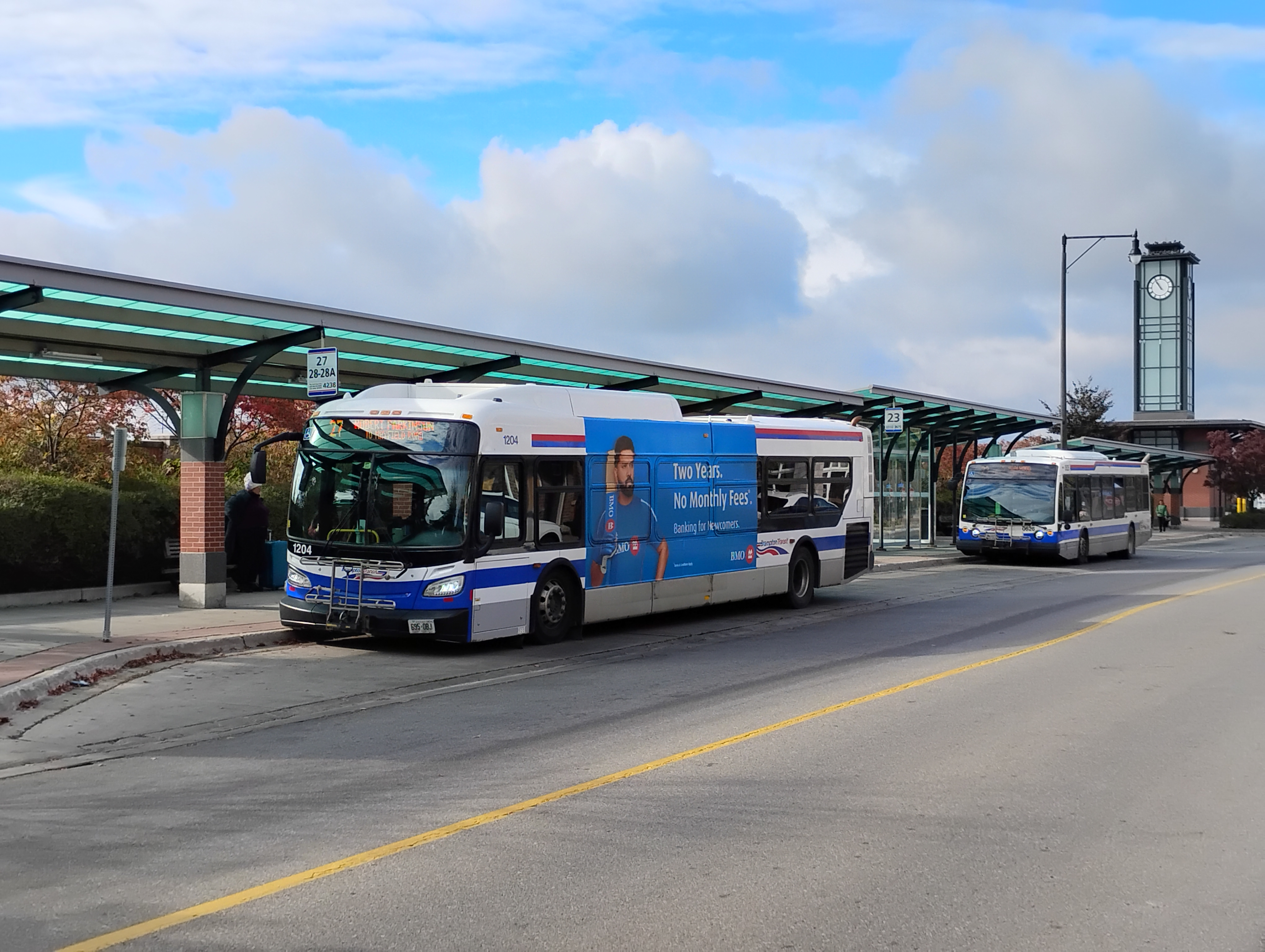
North side terminal at Mount Pleasant GO station

- Bramalea GO Station – Routes: 11/11A/11D, 13, 15/15A, 16, 115, 301, 511/511C
- Brampton GO Station – connection to Downtown Transit Terminal via pedestrian tunnel. Also connects with Via Rail.
- Mount Pleasant GO Station – Has two terminals; one on each side of the station: Routes: 1, 4C, 5/5A, 9, 29/29A, 60/60A, 505, 561 at the south side terminal. Routes 6, 23, 26, 27, and 28/28A at the north Mount Pleasant Village terminal.
- Lisgar GO Station in Mississauga – Routes: 11/11D, 511
- Malton GO Station in Mississauga – Route: 14/14A. Also connects with Via Rail.

=== Terminals outside Brampton ===
- Westwood Square in Mississauga – Routes: 5, 14/14A, 30
- Humber College Bus Terminal (Humber Polytechnic North Campus) in Toronto – Routes: 11/11A/11D, 50/50A, 511/511C
- Pearson International Airport in Mississauga – Route: 115
- Mississauga City Centre Transit Terminal in Mississauga – Route: 502 Züm Main
- University of Toronto Mississauga bus terminal in Mississauga – Route: 199
- Viscount Terminal Link station in Mississauga - Route: 505 Züm Bovaird

== Routes ==
All Brampton Transit and Züm routes are wheelchair-accessible.

| Legend | | Bus type used |
|---|---|---|
| 1 | Regular service | Regular |
| 104 | Express service | Regular |
| 200 | iRide school service | Regular |
| 300 | Employment shuttle service | Regular |
| 501 | Bus rapid transit (BRT) service | Züm |

| Route | | Direction and termini | | | | Connecting Züm services | Availability (Note: Unless otherwise noted, services are available 7 days a week.) |
|---|---|---|---|---|---|---|---|
| 1 | Queen | EB | To Highway 50 via Bramalea Terminal via Flower City Community Campus (limited service only) | WB | To Mount Pleasant GO Station via Bramalea Terminal via Flower City Community Campus (limited service only) | 501 502 505 561 | |
| 1A | Queen | EB | To Coventry Road via Bramalea Terminal via Flower City Community Campus (limited service only) | WB | To Major William Sharpe Drive via Bramalea Terminal via Flower City Community Campus (limited service only) | 501 502 505 561 | Mon–Fri (no evening service) |
| 2 | Main | NB | To Heart Lake Terminal via Brampton Gateway Terminal | SB | To Hurontario/407 GO Park & Ride via Brampton Gateway Terminal | 501 502 505 511 511C 561 | |
| 3 | McLaughlin | NB | To Sandalwood Loop | SB | To Brampton Gateway Terminal | 502 505 511 511C 561 | |
| 3A | McLaughlin | NB | To Sandalwood Loop via Flower City Community Campus | SB | To Brampton Gateway Terminal via Flower City Community Campus | 502 505 511 511C 561 | |
| 4 | Chinguacousy | NB | To Clockwork Drive via Sheridan College | SB | To Brampton Gateway Terminal | 502 505 511 511C 561 | |
| 4C | Chinguacousy | NB | To Mount Pleasant GO Station via Sheridan College | SB | To Brampton Gateway Terminal | 502 505 511 511C 561 | |
| 5 | Bovaird | EB | To Westwood Square via Trinity Common Terminal | WB | To Mount Pleasant GO Station via Trinity Common Terminal | 501 502 505 511 511C 561 | |
| 5A | Bovaird | EB | To Gore Meadows Community Centre via Trinity Common Terminal | WB | To Mount Pleasant GO Station via Trinity Common Terminal | 501 502 505 511 511C 561 | Mon–Fri |
| 6 | James Potter | NB | To Mount Pleasant Village | SB | To Hurontario/407 GO Park & Ride | 502 505 511 561 | |
| 7 | Kennedy | NB | To Mayfield Road | SB | To Courtneypark Drive | 501 502 505 511 511C | |
| 7A | Kennedy | NB | To Heart Lake Terminal | SB | To Courtneypark Drive | 501 502 505 511 511C | Mon-Fri |
| 8 | Centre | EB | To Bramalea Terminal | WB | To Brampton Gateway Terminal | 501 502 511 511C | |
| 9 | Vodden | EB | To Edvac Drive via Bramalea Terminal | WB | To Mount Pleasant GO Station via Bramalea Terminal | 501 502 505 561 | No late evening service |
| 10 | South Industrial | NB | To Bramalea Terminal | SB | To First Gulf Boulevard | 501 511 511C | Mon–Fri (no evening service) |
| 11 | Steeles | EB | To Humber College Bus Terminal via Brampton Gateway Terminal | WB | To Lisgar GO Station via Brampton Gateway Terminal | 502 505 511 511C | |
| 11A | Steeles | EB | To Humber College Bus Terminal | WB | To Brampton Gateway Terminal | 502 505 511 511C | |
| 11D | Steeles | EB | To Humber College Bus Terminal via Brampton Gateway Terminal via Maple Lodge Farms | WB | To Lisgar GO Station via Brampton Gateway Terminal via Maple Lodge Farms | 502 505 511 511C | Mon–Fri (limited service) |
| 12 | Grenoble | NB | To Countryside Drive via Brampton Civic Hospital | SB | To Bramalea Terminal via Brampton Civic Hospital | 501 505 | |
| 13 | Avondale | NB | To Bramalea Terminal | SB | To Bramalea GO Station | 501 511 511C | Mon–Sat |
| 14 | Torbram | NB | To Countryside Drive | SB | To Westwood Square | 501 505 511 511C | |
| 14A | Torbram | NB | To Countryside Drive | SB | To Westwood Square | 501 505 511 511C | |
| 15 | Bramalea | NB | To Inspire Boulevard via Bramalea Terminal | SB | To Derry Road via Bramalea Terminal | 501 505 511 511C | |
| 15A | Bramalea | NB | To Countryside Drive via Bramalea Terminal | SB | To Bramalea GO Station via Bramalea Terminal | 501 505 511 511C | Mon–Fri (no late evening service) |
| 16 | Southgate | NB | To Bramalea Terminal | SB | To Bramalea GO Station | 501 511 511C | |
| 17 | Howden | NB | To Trinity Common Terminal | SB | To Bramalea Terminal | 501 505 | |
| 18 | Dixie | NB | To Mayfield Road via Bramalea Terminal | SB | To Meyerside Drive via Bramalea Terminal | 501 505 511 511C | |
| 18A | Dixie | NB | To UPS Caledon via Bramalea Terminal | SB | To Meyerside Drive via Bramalea Terminal | 501 505 511 511C | Limited service |
| 19 | Fernforest | NB | To Countryside Drive | SB | To Bramalea Terminal | 501 | |
| 20 | East Industrial | EB | To Devon Road | WB | To Bramalea Terminal | 501 505 505A | Mid-day |
| 20A | East Industrial | EB | To Airport Road And Driver Road | WB | To Bramalea Terminal | 501 505 511 511C | Peak hours |
| 23 | Sandalwood | EB | To Highway 50 and Fogal Road via Trinity Common Terminal | WB | To Mount Pleasant Village (Mount Pleasant GO Station north side) via Trinity Common Terminal | 501 502 505 | |
| 24 | Van Kirk | NB | To Collingwood Avenue | SB | To Peel Memorial Hospital | 501 502 561 | |
| 25 | Edenbrook | NB | To Tim Manley and Petch Avenues | SB | To Peel Memorial Hospital | 501 502 561 | Peak hours |
| 26 | Mount Pleasant | NB | To Mayfield Road | SB | To Mount Pleasant Village (Mount Pleasant GO Station north side) | 505 561 | |
| 27 | Robert Parkinson | NB | To Mayfield Road | SB | To Mount Pleasant Village (Mount Pleasant GO Station north side) | 505 561 | Mon–Sat (no evening service) |
| 28 | Wanless | EB | To Heart Lake Terminal | WB | To Mount Pleasant Village (Mount Pleasant GO Station north side) | 502 505 561 | No evening service |
| 28A | Wanless | EB | To Heart Lake Terminal via Remembrance Road | WB | To Mount Pleasant Village (Mount Pleasant GO Station north side) via Remembrance Road | 502 505 561 | No evening service |
| 29 | Williams | EB | To Queen Street and Goreway Drive | WB | To Mount Pleasant GO Station | 501 502 505 561 | |
| 30 | Airport Road | NB | To Mayfield Road; To AMB Distribution Centre (limited service only) | SB | To Westwood Square | 501 505 511 511C | |
| 31 | McVean | NB | To Mayfield Road | SB | To Queen Street | 501 | |
| 31A | McVean | NB | To Bloomsbury Avenue and Richgrove Drive via Castlemore Road and Goreway Drive | SB | To Queen Street | 501 | |
| 32 | Father Tobin | CW | To Trinity Common Terminal | | | 505 | |
| 35 | Clarkway | NB | To Humberwest Parkway/Airport Road via Gore Meadows Community Centre | SB | To Queen Street/Highway 50 via Gore Meadows Community Centre | 501 505 | |
| 41 | Bolton | NB | To Caledon Recreation Centre | SB | To Queen St and Hwy 50 | 501 | Peak hours |
| 50 | Gore Road | NB | To Gore Meadows Community Centre | SB | To Humber College Bus Terminal | 501 511 511C | |
| 50A | Gore Road | NB | To The Gore Road and Squire Ellis Drive via Gore Meadows Community Centre | SB | To Humber College Bus Terminal | 501 511 511C | |
| 51 | Hereford | EB | To Royal Bank Drive/Syntex Court | WB | To Steeles Avenue/Heritage Road | 511 | |
| 52 | McMurchy | NB | To Downtown Brampton Terminal | SB | To Brampton Gateway Terminal | 501 502 511 511C 561 | |
| 53 | Ray Lawson | EB | To Brampton Gateway Terminal | WB | To James Potter Road/Charolais Boulevard | 502 511 511C | |
| 53A | Ray Lawson | EB | To Brampton Gateway Terminal | WB | To Creditview Road/Bonnie Braes Drive | 502 511 511C 561 | Mon-Fri (Limited service) |
| 54 | County Court | CW | To Brampton Gateway Terminal | | | 502 511 511C | |
| 57 | Charolais | NB | To Major William Sharpe Drive via Flower City Community Campus | SB | To Brampton Gateway Terminal | 502 511 511C 561 | |
| 58 | Financial | NB | To Embleton Road/Rivermont Road | SB | To Derry Road | 511 | Peak hours |
| 60 | Mississauga Road | NB | To Mount Pleasant GO Station | SB | To Royal Bank Drive and Syntex Court | 505 511 561 | |
| 60A | Mississauga Road | NB | To Mount Pleasant GO Station | SB | To Queen Street and Mississauga Road | 505 561 | Mon-Fri (Limited service) |
| 81 | Mayfield West | NB | To Bonnieglen Farm Boulevard | SB | To Sandalwood Loop | 502 | |
| 104 | Chinguacousy Express | NB | To Sandalwood Parkway via Sheridan College | SB | To Brampton Gateway Terminal via Sheridan College | 502 505 511 511C 561 | Mon–Fri |
| 115 | Airport Express | NB | To Bramalea Terminal | SB | To Toronto Pearson International Airport Terminal 1 | 501 505 511 511C | |
| 199 | UTM Express | NB | To Brampton Gateway Terminal | SB | To University of Toronto Mississauga via Highway 407 | 502 511 511C | Peak hours Sep–Apr |
| 200 | Turner Fenton SS | EB | To Turner Fenton Secondary School | WB | To Brampton Gateway Terminal | 502 511 511C | School |
| 201 | Mayfield SS | EB | To Mayfield Secondary School via Inder Heights Drive | WB | To Heart Lake Terminal via Inder Heights Drive | | School |
| 202 | Mayfield SS | EB | To Mayfield Secondary School via Braidwood Lake Drive and Kenpark Avenue | WB | To Heart Lake Terminal via Kenpark Avenue | | School |
| 203 | Mayfield SS | WB | To Heart Lake Terminal via Kennedy Road | | | | School |
| 204 | Mayfield SS | WB | To Heart Lake Terminal via Braidwood Lake Road | | | | School |
| 205 | St. Thomas Aquinas SS | EB | To St. Thomas Aquinas Secondary School via Queen Street | WB | To Bramalea Terminal via Queen Street | 501 | School |
| 206 | St. Augustine SS | NB | To St. Augustine Secondary School | SB | To County Court Boulevard | 502 511 | School |
| 207 | Mayfield SS | NB | To Mayfield Secondary School via Bramalea Road | SB | To Bramalea Terminal via Bramalea Road | 501 505 | School |
| 208 | Mayfield SS | NB | To Mayfield Secondary School via Dixie Road | SB | To Bramalea Terminal via Dixie Road | 501 505 | School |
| 209 | St. Augustine SS | NB | To Major William Sharpe Drive | SB | To St. Augustine Secondary School | 561 | School |
| 211 | Chinguacousy SS | EB | To Goreway Drive | WB | To Chinguacousy Secondary School | 505 | School |
| 212 | St. Roch SS | NB | To St. Edmund Campion Secondary School | SB | To St. Roch Secondary School | 505 | School |
| 213 | St. Edmund Campion SS | NB | To Mayfield Road | SB | To St. Edmund Campion Secondary School | | School |
| 214 | Cardinal Ambrozic SS | EB | To Cardinal Ambrozic Secondary School | WB | To Airport Road | 505 | School |
| 215 | St. Thomas Aquinas SS | EB | To St. Thomas Aquinas Secondary School via Vodden Street | WB | To Mount Pleasant GO Station via Vodden Street | 501 502 505 561 | School |
| 216 | David Suzuki SS | EB | To Nelson Street | WB | To David Suzuki Secondary School | 501 502 505 561 | School |
| 217 | St. Thomas Aquinas SS | EB | To St. Thomas Aquinas Secondary School via Central Park Drive | WB | To Bramalea Terminal via Central Park Drive | 501 | School |
| 218 | Heart Lake SS | EB | To Heart Lake Terminal | WB | To Heart Lake Secondary School | | School |
| 300 | Heart Lake Employment Shuttle | NB | To Ecopark Close (Heart Lake Business Park) | SB | To Trinity Common Terminal | 505 | Limited service |
| 301 | Westcreek | NB | To Bramalea GO Station | SB | To Westcreek Boulevard | 511 511C | Mon–Fri (limited service) |
| 302 | Deerhurst | NB | To Queen Street/Goreway Drive | SB | To Steeles Avenue/Goreway Drive | 501 511 511C | Peak hours |
| 501 | Züm Queen | EB | To Smart VMC Terminal | WB | To Downtown Brampton Terminal | 502 505 561 | |
| 502 | Züm Main | NB | To Sandalwood Loop via Brampton Gateway Terminal | SB | To Mississauga City Centre (Square One) via Brampton Gateway Terminal | 501 505 511 511C 561 | |
| 505 | Züm Bovaird | EB | To Viscount Station | WB | To Mount Pleasant GO Station | 501 502 511 511C 561 | No evening service |
| 511 | Züm Steeles | EB | To Humber College Bus Terminal via Brampton Gateway Terminal | WB | To Lisgar GO Station via Brampton Gateway Terminal | 502 505 | |
| 511C | Züm Steeles | EB | To Humber College Bus Terminal via Brampton Gateway Terminal | WB | To Sheridan College via Brampton Gateway Terminal | 502 505 | |
| 561 | Züm Queen West | EB | To Downtown Brampton Terminal | WB | To Mount Pleasant GO Station | 501 502 505 | Mon–Fri (no evening service) |
Under construction
| 504 | Züm Chinguacousy | NB | To Sandalwood Parkway | SB | To Bramalea GO Station | 502 505 511 511C 561 | TBA |

== Vehicles ==
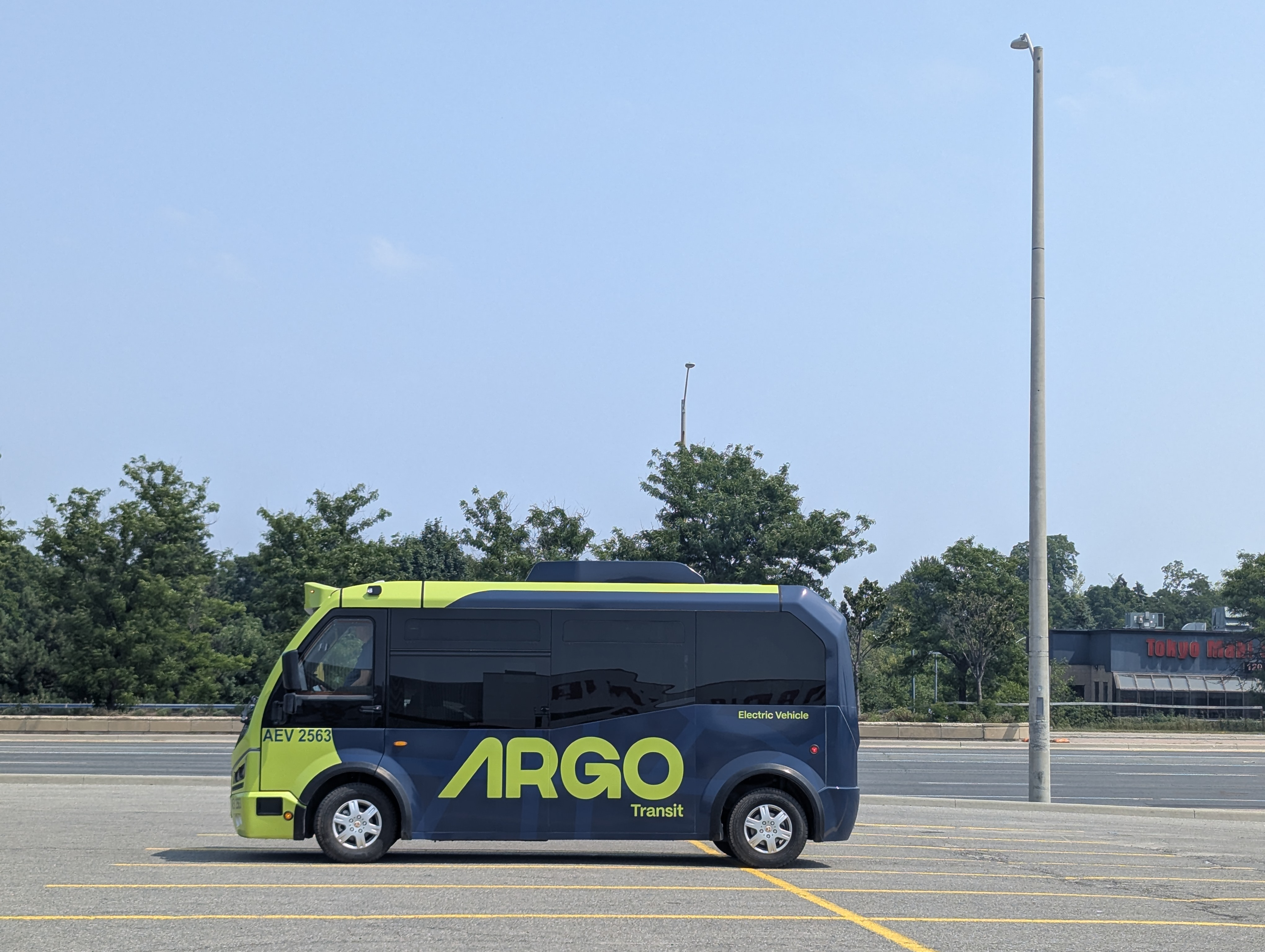
Fully electric Argo vehicle available on-demand to residents as part of a 12-month pilot project launched in Summer 2025

Brampton Transit has an active fleet of 473 buses including:

- New Flyer:
  - 2008-2010 D40LF: 0830-0838 (0830-0834: Clark. 0835, 0837-0838: Sandalwood) (Former London Transit 138, 140-141, 143-144, 147, 156, 159)
  - 2010 XDE40: 1050-1074 (Sandalwood)
  - 2010-2011 XD40: 1101–1130 (Clark)
  - 2011 XDE40: 1150–1165 (Sandalwood)
  - 2012 XD40: 1201–1218 (1201–1210: Sandalwood. 1211–1218: Clark)
  - 2012 XDE40: 1250–1251 (Sandalwood)
  - 2012 XDE60: 1275–1294 (Sandalwood)
  - 2013 XDE60: 1475–1484 (Sandalwood)
  - 2014 XDE60: 1575–1579 (Sandalwood)
  - 2015 XDE60: 1580–1592 (Sandalwood)
  - 2016 XDE60: 1675–1682 (Sandalwood)
  - 2017 XDE60: 1775–1784 (Sandalwood)
  - 2018 XDE60: 1875–1885 (Sandalwood)
  - 2019 XDE60: 1975, 1976 (Sandalwood)
  - 2020 XDE60: 2075-2084 (Sandalwood)
  - 2020-2021 XE40: 2152-2157 (Sandalwood)
  - 2024 XDE40: 2401-2422 (Sandalwood)
  - 2024 XD60: 2475-2492 (Sandalwood)
  - 2026 XD60: 2621-2640 (Sandalwood)
  - 2026 XD60: 2675-2689 (Sandalwood)
- Nova Bus:
  - 2005–2006 2nd Gen LFS: 0601-0621 (Clark)
  - 2006: 2nd Gen LFS: 0622-0638 (0622-0625: Clark. 0626-0638: Sandalwood)
  - 2007: 2nd Gen LFS: 0701-0715 (Sandalwood)
  - 2007-2008 2nd Gen LFS: 0730-0739 (Sandalwood) (Former Grand River Transit 2701, 2706-2709, 2716, 2718, 2723, 8013, 8018)
  - 2008: 2nd Gen LFS: 0801-0827 (Clark)
  - 2009: 2nd Gen LFS: 0901-0916 (0901-0910: Sandalwood. 0911-0916: Clark)
  - 2009: 3rd Gen LFS: 0917-0926 (Sandalwood)
  - 2014: 4th Gen LFS: 1401–1414 (1401–1410: Clark. 1411–1415: Sandalwood)
  - 2015: 4th Gen LFS: 1501–1519 (1501–1509: Sandalwood. 1510–1519: Clark)
  - 2016: 4th Gen LFS: 1601–1623 (1601–1609: Sandalwood. 1610–1623: Clark)
  - 2017: 4th Gen LFS: 1701–1713 (1701-1706, 1708-1709: Clark. 1707, 1710-1713: Sandalwood)
  - 2018: 4th Gen LFS: 1801–1823 (1801-1802: Clark. 1803-1823: Sandalwood)
  - 2019: 4th Gen LFS: 1901-1916 (1901-1915: Sandalwood. 1916: Clark)
  - 2020: 4th Gen LFS: 2007-2024 (Sandalwood)
  - 2021: 4th Gen LFS: 2101-2108 (Sandalwood)
  - 2022: 4th Gen LFS: 2201-2224 (2201-2209: Sandalwood. 2210-2224: Clark)
  - 2025-2026 4th Gen LFS: 2501-2538
  - 2025: 4th Gen LFSe+: 2550-2559 (Sandalwood)

Retired models include:

- GMC New Look (T6H-4523N, T6H-5307N, T8H-5307A and others) Last unit retired in early 2007.
- New Flyer D800B (last unit retired in 2001).
- New Flyer D40 Suburban (formerly GO Transit) – retired in 2003 and 2004.
- Orion Bus Industries Orion I in 30' and 40' versions (last unit retired in 2011).
- Motor Coach Industries Classics retired in 2008.
- Leyland Olympian Double Decker 8500 (sold, now operated by a tour company in downtown Toronto)
- Orion Bus Industries (Orion V models from 1991 & 1999, Orion VI models from 1996 & 1998)
- New Flyer D40LF (models from 1996 retired by September 2012), (2002 and 2003 models retired by Summer 2021), (2004 models retired by March 2024). Last units, 0421 and 0427, retired in January 2023 and March 2024 respectively.
- New Flyer D60LF (formerly London Transit 21) retired in 2026.

Brampton Transit Transit Enforcement Officers patrol in white hybrid vehicles (Ford Fusion, Toyota Camry) with red and blue stripes.

== Garage facilities ==
Brampton Transit operates two bus garages; the Clark facility located at 185 Clark Boulevard, and the Sandalwood facility at 130 Sandalwood Parkway West. A third garage, the Cadetta Johnston Transit Facility, is under construction on Highway 50 and is expected to open in 2027.

== Bus rapid transit ==
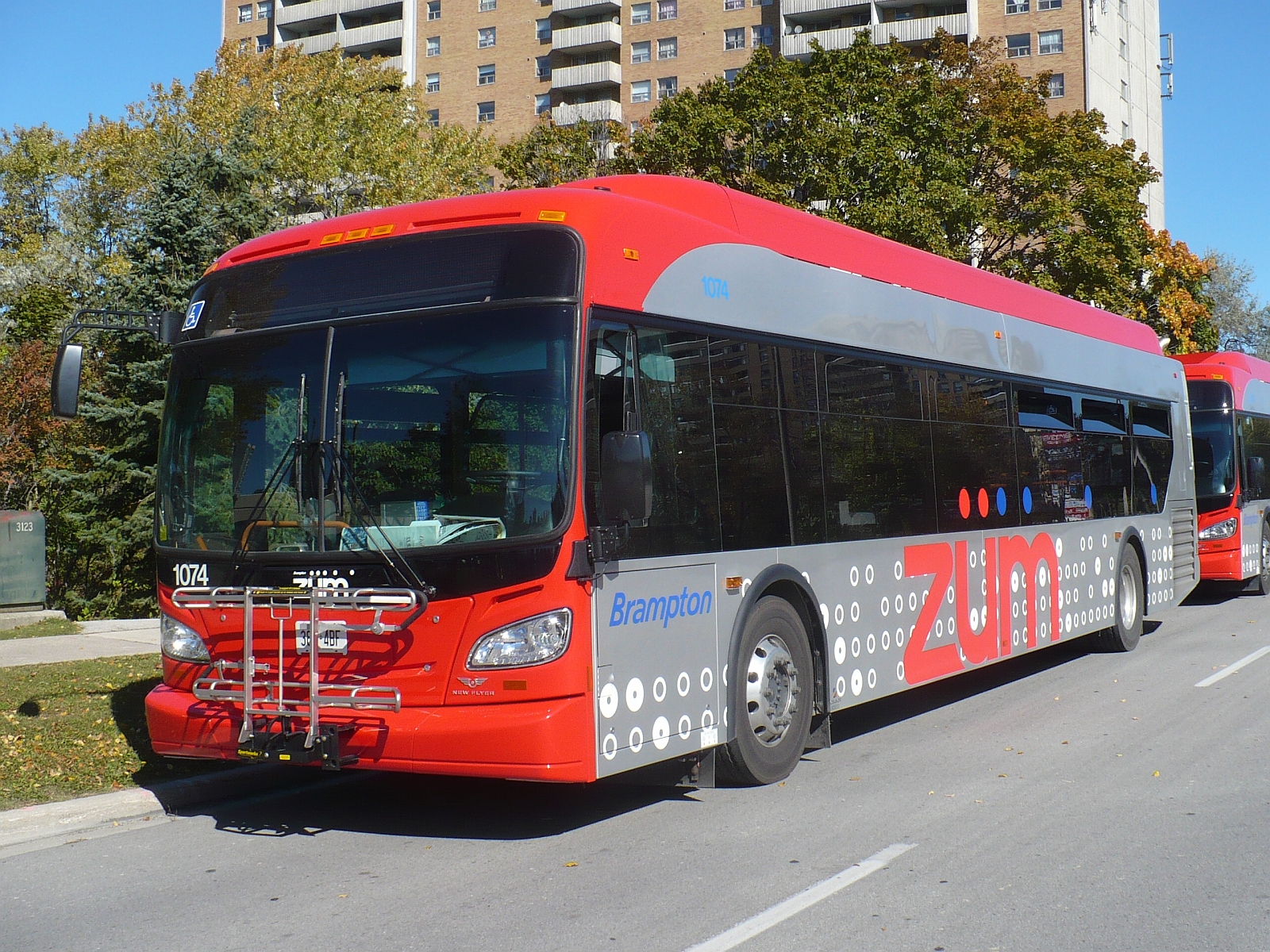
Züm New Flyer XDE40 in October 2010

Züm is Brampton's bus rapid transit system. In order of each route initially opening, its first corridor, 501 Zum Queen was launched on September 20, 2010, and runs along Queen Street from Downtown Brampton to York University via Bramalea Terminal. It later branched out to add frequency to the route, with the 501A going along Highway 407 and the 501C beginning at Bramalea Terminal rather than Downtown Brampton, to York University (both branches were discontinued in 2024). 502 Züm Main opened in 2011 and runs North & South along Main/Hurontario Street from Sandalwood Loop to Mississauga City Centre Transit Terminal (Square One). 511 Züm Steeles opened in 2012 and goes east to west along Steeles Avenue, from Lisgar GO Station in Meadowvale, Mississauga, to Humber College Bus Terminal in Toronto via Sheridan College and Brampton Gateway Terminal. 561 Zum Queen West opened in 2016 and operates service from Downtown Brampton to Mount Pleasant GO Station via Queen Street and Mississauga Road.

505 Züm Bovaird opened in 2014 and went east to west along Bovaird Drive from Mount Pleasant GO Station to the Queen Loop at Goreway and Queen. A north-to-south extension along Airport Road to Malton GO station was opened in 2018, realigning the route while no longer servicing the Queen Loop. A branch of this route, 505A, opening in 2022, runs from Trinity Common Terminal to Viscount station on the Pearson Airport Terminal Link Train. As of June 29, 2026, the 505A Züm Bovaird branch has been removed, and has been replaced by an extension of the regular 505 Züm Bovaird branch to Viscount Station, no longer serving Malton GO Station.

A new Zum Route along Chinguacousy Road is currently under construction. It will connect the Cassie Campbell Community Centre at Sandalwood Parkway, to Bramalea GO Station via Steeles Avenue. It will also connect with the under-construction Hurontario LRT upon that line's opening. This corridor is being constructed to alleviate overcrowding on the existing 4/4A Chinguacousy and Routes 11/11A/511/511A/511C along Steeles. The routes are currently the 2nd busiest and 5th busiest, respectively.

== Accidents ==
On November 16, 2011, a Züm bus on the 501 Queen route crashed through a noise wall after colliding with an SUV on Highway 7 in Vaughan, sending five people to the hospital. In the early hours of October 9, 2024, another Züm bus, this one not in service and carrying no passengers, crashed at a sharp angle through a similar wall along Bovaird Drive after colliding with a car, demolishing fences as it plowed through several backyards, although there were no injuries.

== See also ==
Brampton Transit makes connections to other transit systems in the Greater Toronto Area:

- Milton Transit
- MiWay (Mississauga Transit)
- Toronto Transit Commission (TTC)
- GO Transit
- UP Express
- Terminal Link Train
- York Regional Transit (YRT)
- Via Rail
