= Trinity Common Terminal =

Bus station in Brampton, Ontario, Canada

General information
- Location: 164 Great Lakes Drive; Brampton, Ontario; Canada
- Coordinates: 43°43′50″N 79°45′51″W
- Owner: City of Brampton
- Bus stands: 6
- Bus operators: Brampton Transit; GO Transit

Construction
- Structure type: At-grade
- Accessible: yes

Other information
- Station code: GO Transit: TRCM

History
- Opened: 1999
Location

Trinity Common Terminal is a Brampton Transit operated bus terminal serving the northeast area of Brampton, Ontario, Canada. Located centrally within Trinity Common Mall. The building for Trinity Common Terminal is currently closed until further notice.

== Routes ==
This terminal has 6 bus bays, with 2 being used as GO Transit bays.

=== Brampton Transit ===
==== Regular routes ====
- 5/5A Bovaird
- 17 Howden
- 23 Sandalwood
- 32 Father Tobin
- 300 Heart Lake Employment Shuttle

==== Züm route (bus rapid transit) ====
- 505 Züm Bovaird

=== GO Transit ===
- 32 Brampton Trinity Common GO Bus
