= Bolton line (bus route) =

Former public transit bus route serving Bolton, Ontario

Bolton Line

Overview
- Operator: Voyago
- Began service: 11 November 2019
- Ended service: 1 May 2024

Route
- Communities served: Bolton
- Start: Columbia Way
- Via: Highway 50 and Coleraine Drive
- End: Highway 7/Queen Street
- Stops: 39

Service
- Frequency: 30 minutes

The Bolton Line was a rush-hour-only bus route in Caledon, Ontario, Canada, serving the unincorporated community of Bolton within it. The route began service on November 11, 2019 and operated between Columbia Way in the community's north end and Highway 7/Queen Street at the boundary of the cities of Brampton and Vaughan in the south via Highway 50 and Coleraine Drive, serving Bolton's residential and industrial areas and connecting them with Brampton Transit and York Region Transit. The route was operated by Transdev, under contract with the Town of Caledon.

== History ==
On November 11, 2019, the Bolton Line began service, operating between King Street in Bolton and Highway 7/Queen Street.

The route initially operated with 27 stops but was later extended north to Columbia Way, providing service to the Caledon Recreation Centre, surrounding residential neighbourhoods, and nearby schools.

As urbanization was drawing Bolton closer to the Greater Toronto Area's main urban area, Brampton Transit announced plans in 2023 to replace the Bolton Line with Route 41 as part of a broader service expansion within Caledon.

Effective May 1, 2024, Brampton Transit took over the service to Bolton with Route #41 Bolton, replacing the Transdev-operated Bolton Line. The new route eliminated the previous double-fare arrangement and was integrated into Brampton Transit's network.

== See also ==
- Brampton Transit
- Transdev
