= 501 Züm Queen =

Bus rapid transit route in Brampton, Ontario

501

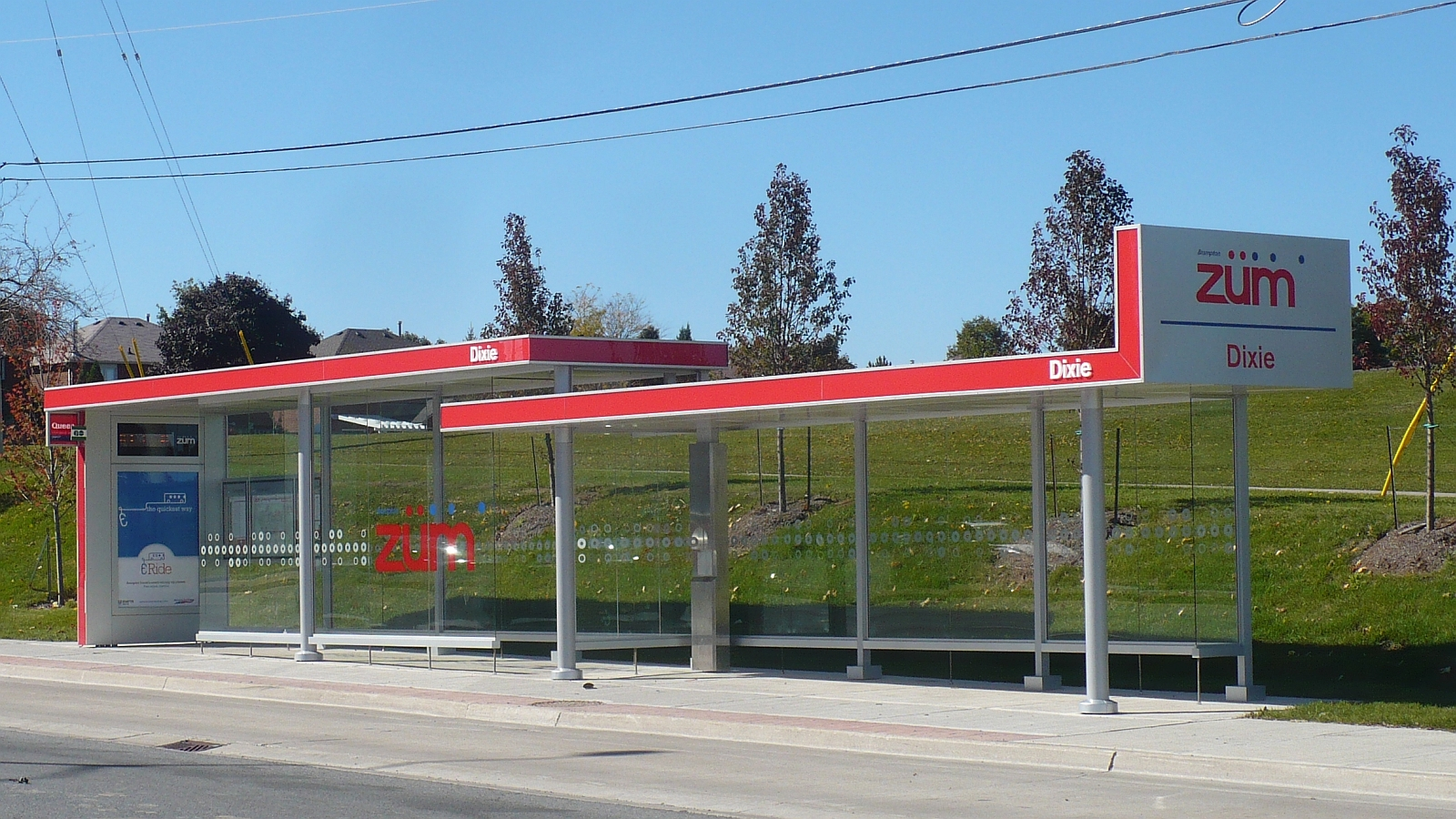
- Typical station stop: Westbound on the north side of Queen Street, just west of Dixie Road

Overview
- System: Züm
- Operator: Brampton Transit
- Vehicle: New Flyer Xcelsior

Route
- Communities served: Brampton and Vaughan
- Start: Downtown Brampton Terminal
- Via: Bramalea Terminal
- End: Vaughan Metropolitan Centre station
- Length: 24.0 kilometres (14.9 mi)
- Stops: 29
- Other routes: Viva Orange

Service
- Frequency: 7.5 minutes or better

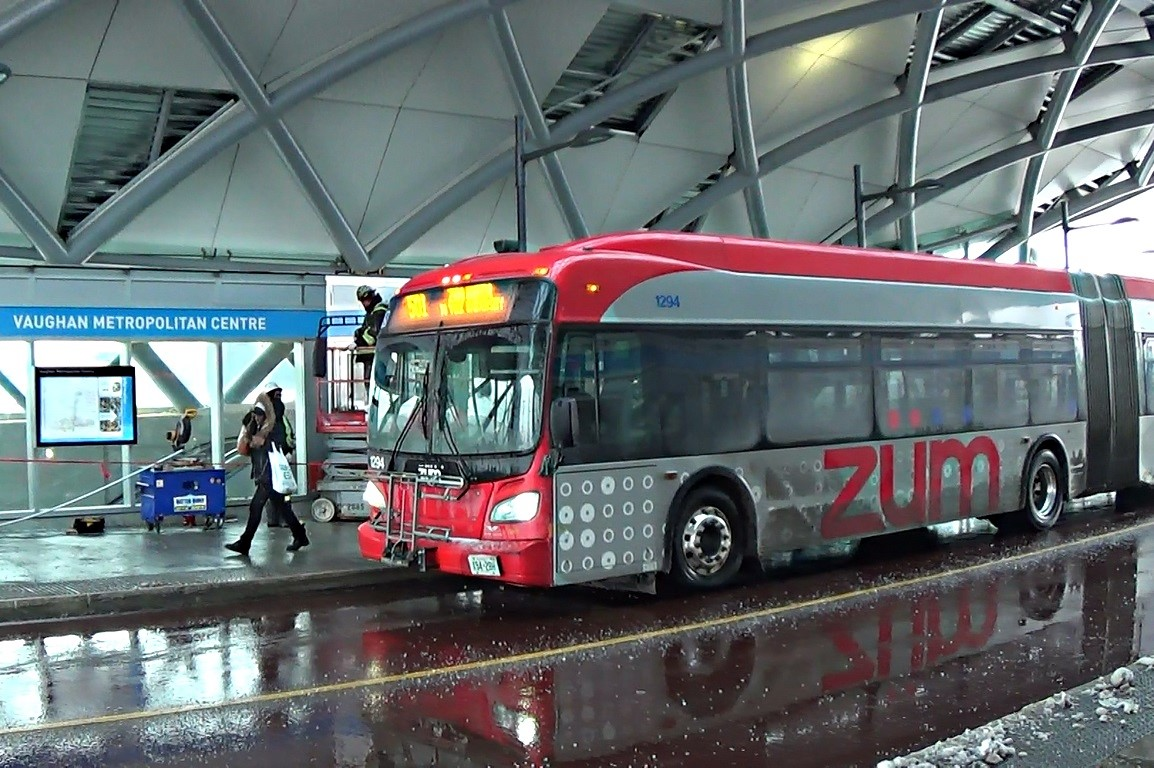
A 501 Züm Queen bus at the Viva station at Vaughan Metropolitan Centre station

501 Züm Queen is a bus rapid transit route in Brampton, Ontario, that is part of the Züm network. The route first began service on September 20, 2010, and runs between the Downtown Brampton Terminal in the west to the Toronto Transit Commission's Vaughan Metropolitan Centre station in Vaughan in the east. It runs along Queen Street in Brampton and continues along Highway 7 in Vaughan.

501 Züm Queen shares routing with York Region Transit's Viva Orange bus rapid transit route between Martin Grove Road and Vaughan Metropolitan Centre, and has been fare integrated with it since its creation. Both Brampton Transit and York Region Transit proofs of payment (Presto-marked transfers for riders paying cash) are accepted for the entire length of both bus routes.

== Route history ==
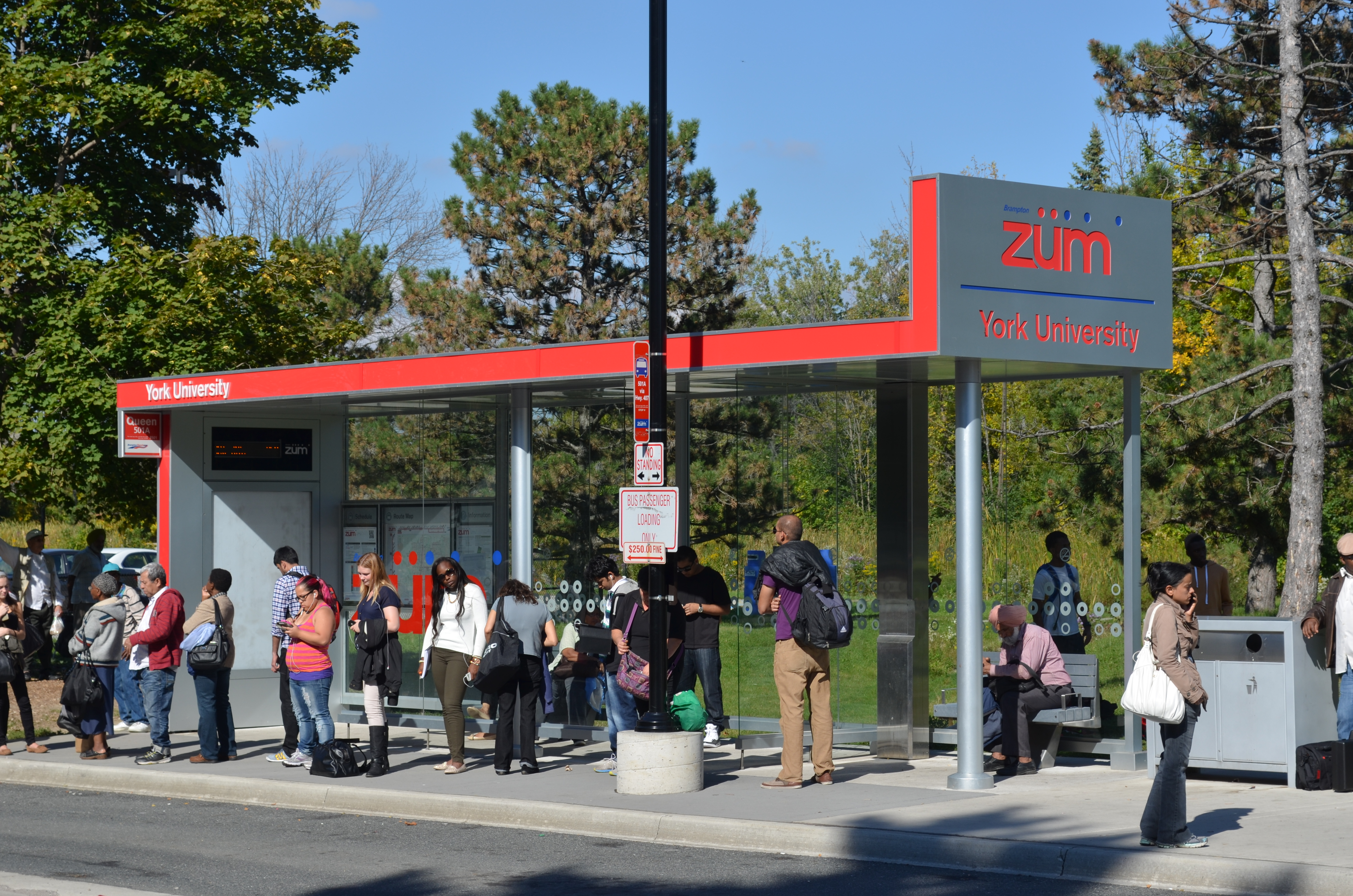
The former Züm stop at York University in 2013. Service to the university ended 11 years later in 2024.

Originally, the route continued to York University (which also had a subway connection when the line's extension to Vaughan opened on December 17, 2017). There were also two branch routes: 501A and 501C, which followed an express routing through Vaughan along Highways 427 and 407, with 501A running the full distance between the Downtown Brampton Terminal and York University, and 501C terminating at the Bramalea Terminal. These two branches were suspended during the COVID-19 pandemic, with the 501C being reinstated on September 6, 2022, and the 501 being cut back to Vaughan Metropolitan Centre station. On June 24, 2024, the 501C branch was cancelled permanently, leaving only the base route operating. Brampton Transit cited high operating costs due to Highway 407 tolls and the recently introduced fare integration program (enabling free transfers from the TTC subway) as reasons for the change.

== Stops ==
501 Queen
Name	Opening Date	Municipality	Local parallel routes	Connections
Downtown Brampton Terminal	September 20, 2010	Brampton	1/1A Queen	502 561
Centre	September 20, 2010	Brampton	1/1A Queen	
Kennedy	September 20, 2010	Brampton	1/1A Queen	
Rutherford	September 20, 2010	Brampton	1/1A Queen; 8 Centre	
West Drive / Laurelcrest	September 20, 2010	Brampton	1/1A Queen; 8 Centre	
Dixie	September 20, 2010	Brampton	8 Centre	
Bramalea Terminal	September 20, 2010	Brampton	1/1A Queen	GO Transit bus services
Bramalea	September 20, 2010	Brampton	1/1A Queen	
Finchgate/Glenvale	September 20, 2010	Brampton	1/1A Queen	
Torbram	September 20, 2010	Brampton	1/1A Queen	
Gateway/Chrysler	September 20, 2010	Brampton	1/1A Queen	
Airport Road	September 20, 2010	Brampton	1/1A Queen	505
Goreway	September 20, 2010	Brampton	1 Queen	
McVean	September 20, 2010	Brampton	1 Queen	
Gore Road	September 20, 2010	Brampton	31 McVean	
Highway 50	September 20, 2010	Brampton, Vaughan	1 Queen; 23 Sandalwood; 35 Clarkway; 41 Bolton; 77 Highway 7 (YRT)	York Region Transit GO Transit bus services
Gibraltar / New Huntington	December 19, 2023	Vaughan		
Roybridge Gate / Vaughan Valley	September 2, 2019	Vaughan	77 Highway 7 (YRT)	
Highway 27	September 20, 2010	Vaughan	77 Highway 7 (YRT)	
Martin Grove	September 20, 2010	Vaughan	77 Highway 7 (YRT)	York Region Transit Viva Orange
Kipling	September 20, 2010	Vaughan	77 Highway 7 (YRT)	York Region Transit Viva Orange
Islington	September 20, 2010	Vaughan	77 Highway 7 (YRT)	York Region Transit Viva Orange
Helen/Wigwoss	November 24, 2019	Vaughan	77 Highway 7 (YRT)	York Region Transit Viva Orange
Pine Valley	September 20, 2010	Vaughan	77 Highway 7 (YRT)	York Region Transit Viva Orange
Ansley Grove / Whitmore	September 20, 2010	Vaughan	77 Highway 7 (YRT)	York Region Transit Viva Orange
Weston	September 20, 2010	Vaughan	77 Highway 7 (YRT)	York Region Transit Viva Orange
Commerce	November 24, 2019	Vaughan	77 Highway 7 (YRT)	York Region Transit Viva Orange
Vaughan Metropolitan Centre	September 20, 2010 (stop) — December 17, 2017 (subway station)	Vaughan	77 Highway 7 (YRT)	York Region Transit Viva Orange Toronto subway Line 1 Yonge–University
Smart VMC Bus Terminal (Note: Smart VMC Bus Terminal is part of the VMC station complex.)	August 31, 2020	Vaughan		York Region Transit Toronto subway Line 1 Yonge–University

== See also ==
- 561 Züm Queen West
