= 502 Züm Main =

Bus rapid transit route in Brampton, Ontario

502

Overview
- System: Züm
- Operator: Brampton Transit
- Vehicle: New Flyer Xcelsior

Route
- Locale: Brampton and Mississauga, Ontario
- Start: Sandalwood Loop
- Via: Main Street / Hurontario Street
- End: Mississauga City Centre Transit Terminal (Square One Shopping Centre)
- Length: 20.3 kilometres (12.6 mi)

Service
- Frequency: 15 minutes or better
- Journey time: 40–50 Minutes

502 Züm Main is a bus rapid transit route in Brampton, Ontario which leads south into Mississauga, Ontario. Operated by Brampton Transit, it is the second Züm (the branding of the system's BRT network) corridor and began service on September 6, 2011. It runs from Sandalwood Parkway in the city's north end to MiWay's City Centre Transit Terminal in downtown Mississauga adjacent to Square One Shopping Centre in the south. It travels via the Downtown Brampton (next to Brampton GO Station) and Brampton Gateway Terminals along Main and Hurontario Streets through both cities. It covers the route of current Route 2, which has frequent rush-hour service. Route 502 extends and replace MiWay's Route 102 InterCity Express. It runs every 10 minutes during rush hours and 20 minutes off-peak hours, including weekends. Route 2's rush hour frequency was reduced to 20 minutes to optimize ridership.

A large portion of this route overlaps Mississauga's Hurontario Street corridor. Miway provides frequent local and express services on this corridor south of Steeles Avenue, with the section between Eglinton Avenue and Britannia Road being served with 3-minute frequencies.

Hurontario and Main from Port Credit GO Station to Queen Street are being converted to a light rail system, the Hurontario LRT. The leftover of the eventual Route 502 north of the Downtown Brampton Terminal will remain and possibly extended to Highway 410 in the north. As a preparation, both MiWay Route 103 and Züm Main overlap express service between Shoppers World Brampton and Eglinton Avenue.

== Stops ==
Stations
Name	Opening Date	City	Local/Other Parallel Routes	Connections
Sandalwood Loop	September 6, 2011	Brampton		
Sandalwood	September 6, 2011	Brampton	2 Main, 28/28A Wanless, 7 Kennedy	GO Transit
Bovaird	September 6, 2011	Brampton	2 Main	505 Züm Bovaird, GO Transit
Williams Parkway	September 6, 2011	Brampton	2 Main	GO Transit
Vodden	September 6, 2011	Brampton	2 Main, 24 Van Kirk, 25 Edenbrook	GO Transit
Nelson/Theatre Lane	September 6, 2011	Brampton	2 Main, 24 Van Kirk, 25 Edenbrook	Downtown Terminal for GO Transit, Via Rail, 501 Züm Queen and 561 Züm Queen West
Wellington	September 6, 2011	Brampton	2 Main	GO Transit
Nanwood	September 6, 2011	Brampton	2 Main	GO Transit
Brampton Gateway Terminal	November 26, 2012	Brampton	2 Main, 56 Kingknoll, 103 Hurontario Express (Miway)	MiWay, 511 Züm Steeles, GO Transit
Sir Lou/County Court North	September 6, 2011	Brampton	2 Main, 56 Kingknoll, 103 Hurontario Express (Miway)	MiWay, GO Transit
Ray Lawson/County Court South	September 6, 2011	Brampton	2 Main, 56 Kingknoll, 103 Hurontario Express (Miway)	MiWay, GO Transit
Derry	September 6, 2011	Mississauga	2 Main, 7/7A Kennedy; 17 Hurontario, 103 Hurontario Express (Miway)	MiWay
Courtneypark	September 6, 2011	Mississauga	2 Main, 7/7A Kennedy; 17 Hurontario, 103 Hurontario Express (Miway)	MiWay
Britannia	September 6, 2011	Mississauga	17 Hurontario, 103 Hurontario Express (Miway)	MiWay
Matheson	September 6, 2011	Mississauga	17 Hurontario, 103 Hurontario Express (Miway)	MiWay
Bristol	September 6, 2011	Mississauga	17 Hurontario, 103 Hurontario Express (Miway)	MiWay
Eglinton	September 6, 2011	Mississauga	17 Hurontario, 103 Hurontario Express (Miway)	MiWay
Mississauga City Centre Transit Terminal	September 6, 2011	Mississauga	17 Hurontario (Miway)	MiWay, GO Transit

== See also ==
- Hurontario LRT
