= 511 Züm Steeles =

Bus rapid transit route in Brampton, Ontario

511

Overview
- System: Züm
- Operator: Brampton Transit
- Vehicle: New Flyer Xcelsior

Route
- Communities served: Mississauga, Brampton, Toronto
- Start: Lisgar GO station
- Via: Steeles Avenue
- End: Humber College Bus Terminal
- Length: 26.2 kilometres (16.3 mi)

Service
- Frequency: 7.5 Minutes Or Better
- Operates: Monday-Sunday

511 Züm Steeles is a bus rapid transit route in Brampton, Ontario, Canada, operated by Brampton Transit as part of its Züm BRT network. The route serves Steeles Avenue and started service on November 26, 2012.

The main route runs from Lisgar GO station in northwest Mississauga east to the Humber College Bus Terminal, the western terminus of the Line 6 Finch West light rail line at Humber Polytechnic Humber North Campus, which is located at Highway 27 and Finch Avenue in Toronto. It makes connections with various local and express bus services at Brampton Gateway Terminal and Bramalea GO Station. Though largely industrial through Brampton, Steeles Avenue sees bus service every six minutes on current route 11. In September 2015, limited service on 511 Zum Steeles was extended to Lisgar GO Station operating only on weekdays. Eventually, full service on the entire route was implemented.

The route was suspended west of Chinguacousy Road in March 2021, after nine drivers tested positive for COVID-19. It was noted that the route led to a "large logistics business," in the midst of an outbreak. Shortly after, the outbreak was confirmed to be Amazon. Peel Public Health Medical Officer of Health Dr. Lawrence Loh denied there was a connection between the two outbreaks.

On December 22, 2022, 511 Zum Steeles along with its local route 11/11A Steeles entered the newly built bus terminal at Bramalea GO Station. This marks the first time that these routes directly serviced the station, as previously they stopped on-street at the intersection of Steeles Avenue and Bramalea Road.

A limited number of 511 Züm Steeles eastbound trips begin service at Amazon Fulfillment Centre at a stop located north of Steeles Avenue on Heritage Road. These trips operate daily during the early morning, early evening and late evening periods.

== Stops ==
Stations
Name	Opening Date	City	Local Parallel Routes	Connections
Lisgar GO Station	September 8, 2015	Mississauga	11 Steeles	GO Transit; Milton / MiWay; Milton Transit
Argentia	September 8, 2015	Mississauga	11 Steeles	MiWay
Winston Churchill	September 8, 2015	Brampton, Halton Hills	11 Steeles	
Heritage	September 8, 2015	Brampton	11 Steeles, 51 Hereford	
Hereford/Rivermont	September 8, 2015	Brampton	11 Steeles, 51 Hereford	
Mississauga	September 8, 2015	Brampton	11 Steeles, 51 Hereford	
Financial	September 8, 2015	Brampton	11 Steeles, 51 Hereford	
Chinguacousy/Mavis	September 8, 2015	Brampton	11 Steeles, 4/4A/104 Chinguacousy, 51 Hereford; 57 Courtneypark, 61 Mavis (Miway)	
McLaughlin (Sheridan College)	September 8, 2015	Brampton	11 Steeles, 3/3A McLaughlin, 4/4A/104 Chinguacousy, 51 Hereford, 53 Ray Lawson, 56 Kingknoll	
McMurchy/Malta	September 8, 2015	Brampton	11 Steeles, 3/3A McLaughlin, 4/4A/104 Chinguacousy, 51 Hereford, 53 Ray Lawson, 56 Kingknoll	
Brampton Gateway Terminal (Shoppers World)	November 26, 2012	Brampton	11 Steeles, 3/3A McLaughlin, 4/4A/104 Chinguacousy, 51 Hereford, 53 Ray Lawson, 56 Kingknoll	502
Kennedy	November 26, 2012	Brampton	11/11A Steeles	GO Transit GO Transit bus services
Rutherford/First Gulf	November 26, 2012	Brampton	11/11A Steeles	GO Transit GO Transit bus services
West Drive/Tomken	November 26, 2012	Brampton	11/11A Steeles	
Dixie	November 26, 2012	Brampton	11/11A Steeles	
Bramalea GO Station	December 22, 2022	Brampton	11/11A Steeles	Kitchener /
Torbram	November 26, 2012	Brampton	11/11A Steeles	
Airport Road	November 26, 2012	Brampton	11/11A Steeles	505
Goreway	November 26, 2012	Brampton	11/11A Steeles	
Finch	November 26, 2012	Brampton	11/11A Steeles (Eastbound)	
Darcel/Longo Circle	September 5, 2017	Mississauga	11/11A Steeles (Westbound); 22 Finch (Miway)	GO Transit GO Transit bus services
Finch/Humber College Boulevard	March 1, 2021	Toronto	11/11A Steeles, 50/50A Gore Road; 22 Finch (Miway)	Finch West TTC buses
Humber College Bus Terminal (Humber College station)	November 26, 2012 (service) — December 7, 2025 (LRT station)	Toronto	11/11A Steeles, 50/50A Gore Road; 22 Finch (Miway)	Finch West TTC buses
