= Mount Pleasant GO Station =

Railway station in Brampton, Ontario, Canada

Mount Pleasant
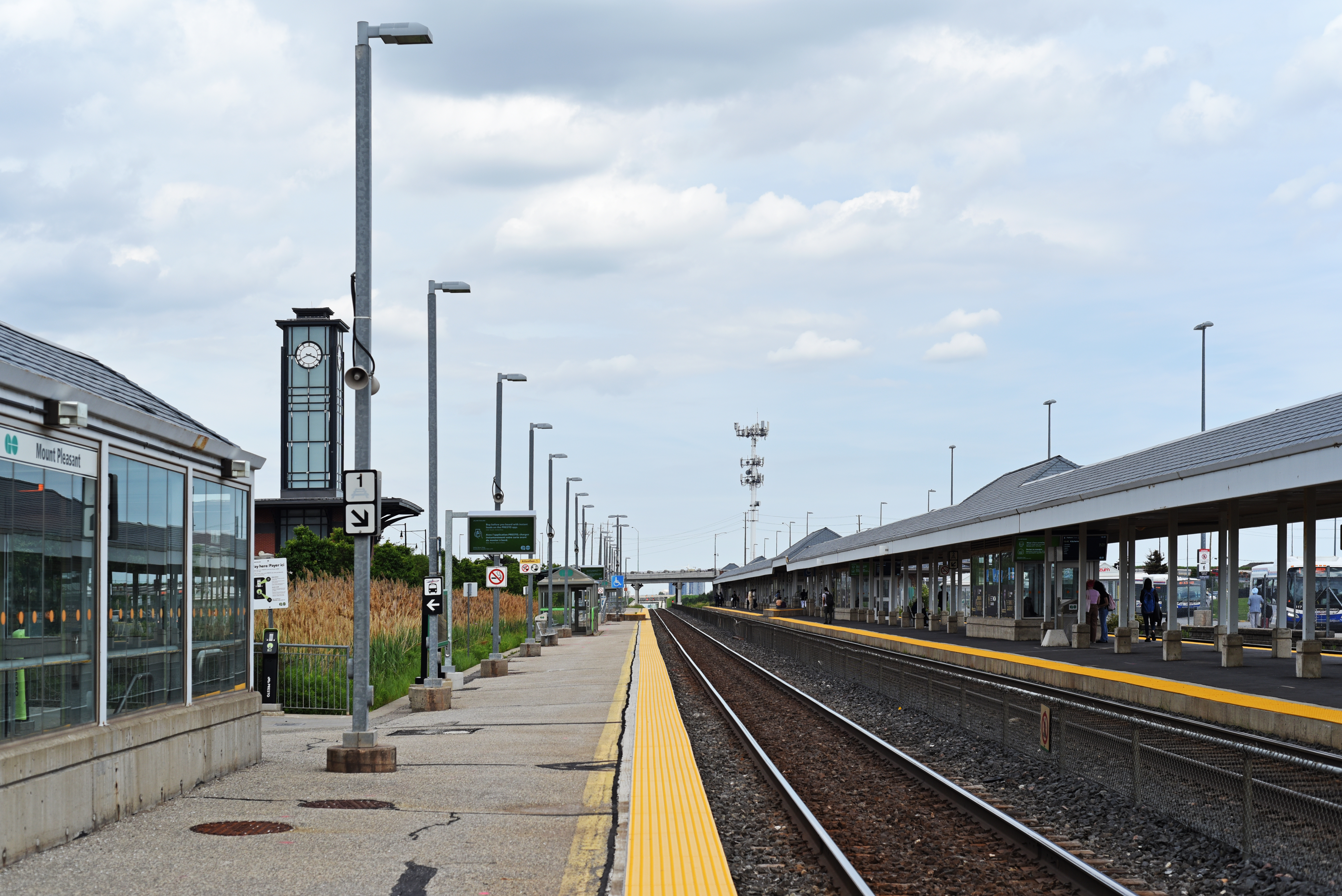

General information
- Location: 1600 Bovaird Drive West; Brampton, Ontario
- Coordinates: 43°40′30″N 79°49′18″W
- Owner: Metrolinx
- Platforms: 2 side platforms, 1 island platform
- Tracks: 3
- Bus routes: 31 33
- Connections: Brampton Transit (including Züm)

Construction
- Parking: 611 spaces
- Cycle facilities: Yes
- Accessible: Yes

Other information
- Station code: GO Transit: MO
- Fare zone: 34

History
- Opened: 2005; 21 years ago

Passengers
- 2018: 3,300 (daily avg.) ▲17.1%

Services
Preceding station	GO Transit	Following station
Georgetown towards Stratford	Kitchener	Brampton towards Union
Location

Mount Pleasant GO Station is a GO Transit railway station in Brampton, Ontario, Canada. Situated on the Kitchener line, it serves the Mount Pleasant district of Brampton. It is located at Bovaird Drive and Ashby Field Drive. As of April 2023, it is the western terminus for weekend and most off-peak Kitchener line train services. The station is wheelchair-accessible with a raised mini-platform. The parking lot has 1486 spaces and sufficient land to permit future expansion to about 2000 spaces.

== History ==
The station was completed on March 15, 2006, but it opened for service on February 7, 2005 while still under construction because GO Transit needed to alleviate parking shortages at Brampton GO Station, and also needed to serve the nearby community.

== Connections ==
The station has two bus terminals; a nine-bay bus loop serving both GO buses and Brampton Transit buses on the south side, and a second with four bays on the north side used exclusively by Brampton Transit buses.

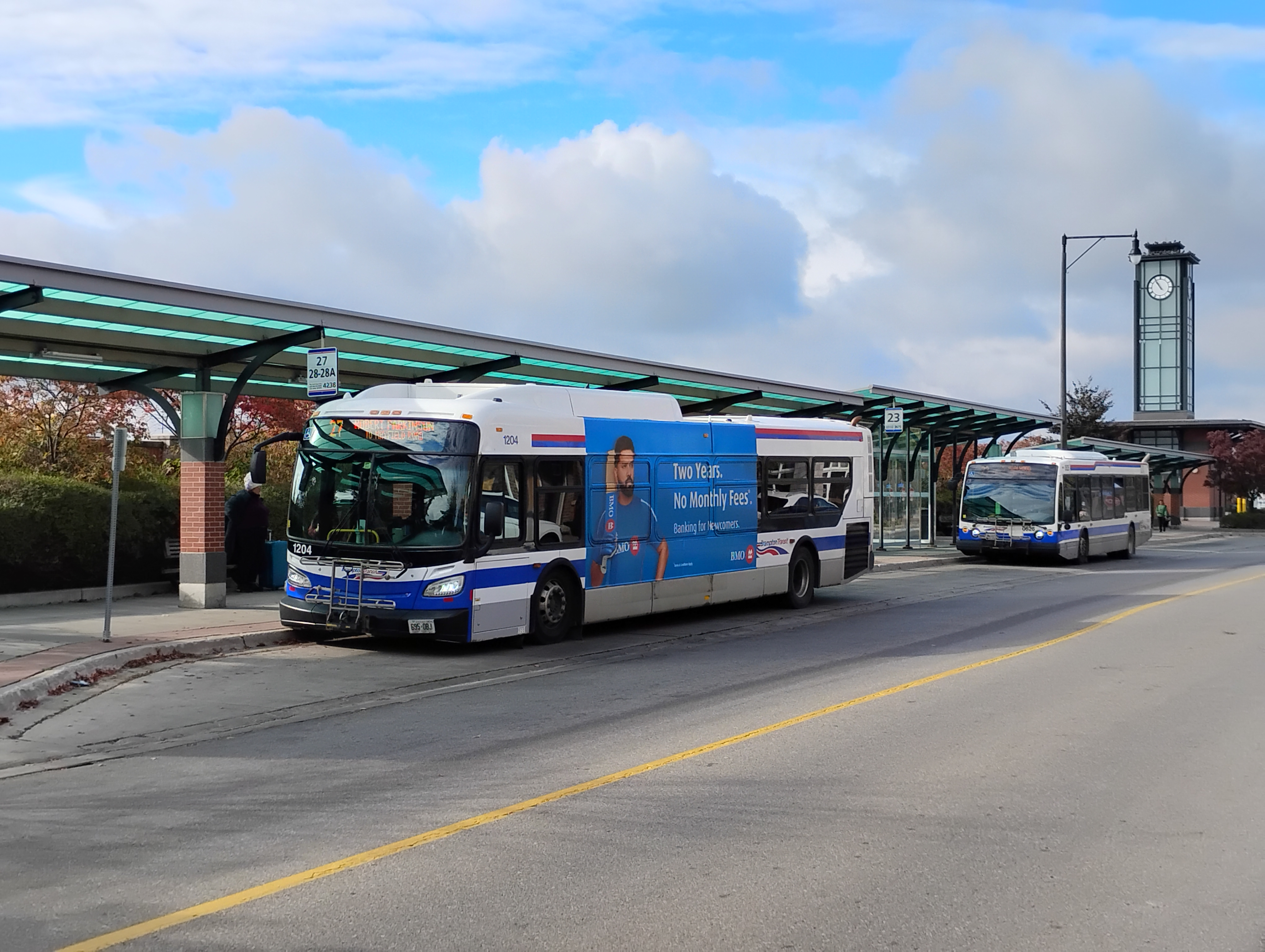
North side terminal

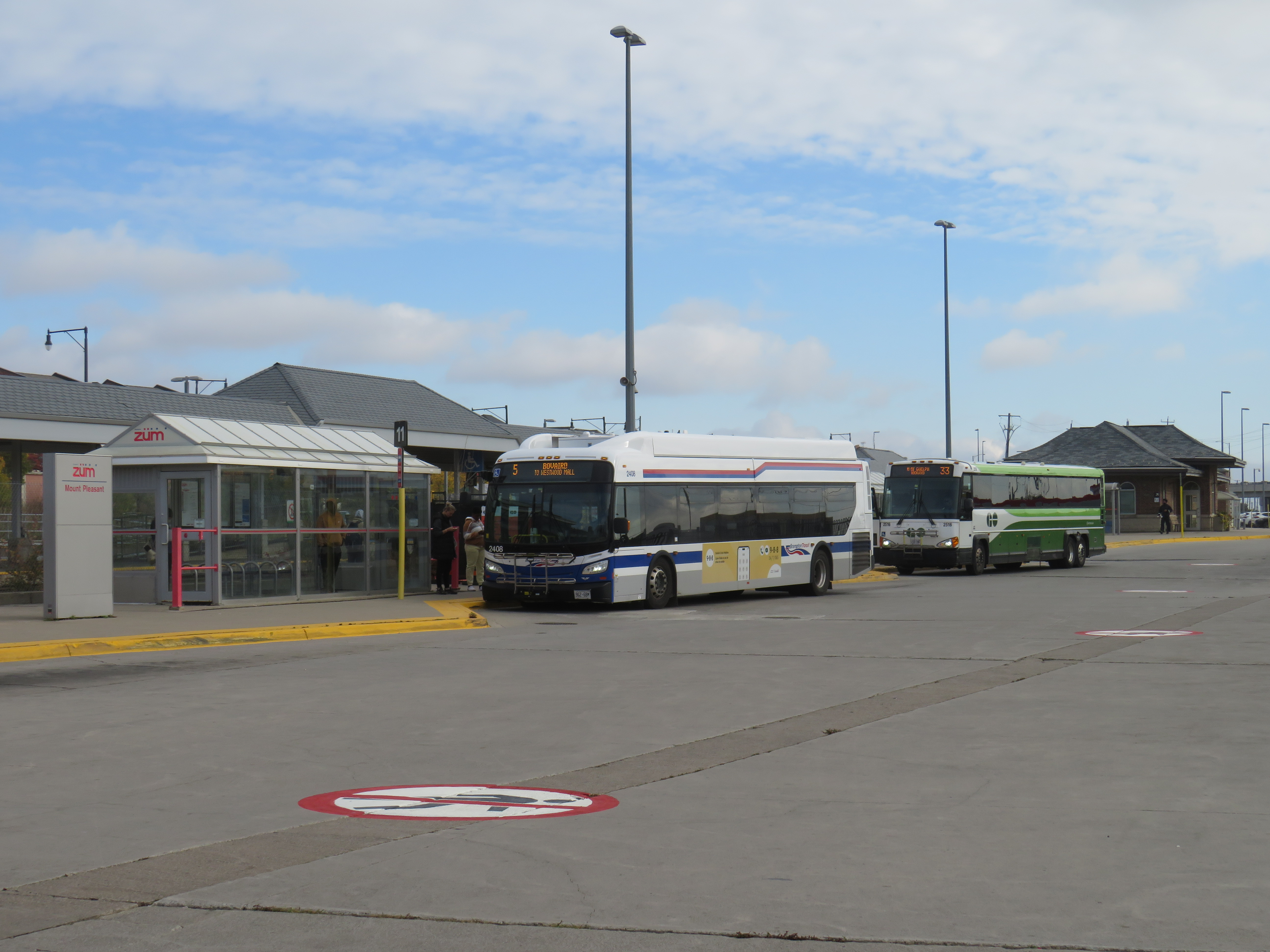
South side terminal

=== Bus bay assignments - North Side ===
- 1 - Brampton Transit Routes: 26 Mount Pleasant
- 2 - Brampton Transit Route: 6 James Potter
- 3 - Brampton Transit Route: 23 Sandalwood
- 4 - Brampton Transit Route: 27 Robert Parkinson & 28/28A Wanless

=== Bus bay assignments - South Side ===
- 5 - Brampton Transit Routes: 60/60A Mississauga Road
- 6 - Brampton Transit Route: 9 Vodden
- 7 - Brampton Transit Route: 29 Williams
- 8 - Brampton Transit Route: 4C Chinguacousy
- 9 - GO Transit Routes: 31-A,B,E,F, 33-D,E Eastbound
- 10 - GO Transit Routes: 31-A,E,F, 33-D,E,F Westbound
- 11 - Brampton Transit Routes: 5/5A Bovaird, 505 Züm Bovaird
- 12 - Brampton Transit Routes: 1 Queen, 561 Züm Queen West
