= Bramalea Terminal =

Bus station in Brampton, Ontario, Canada

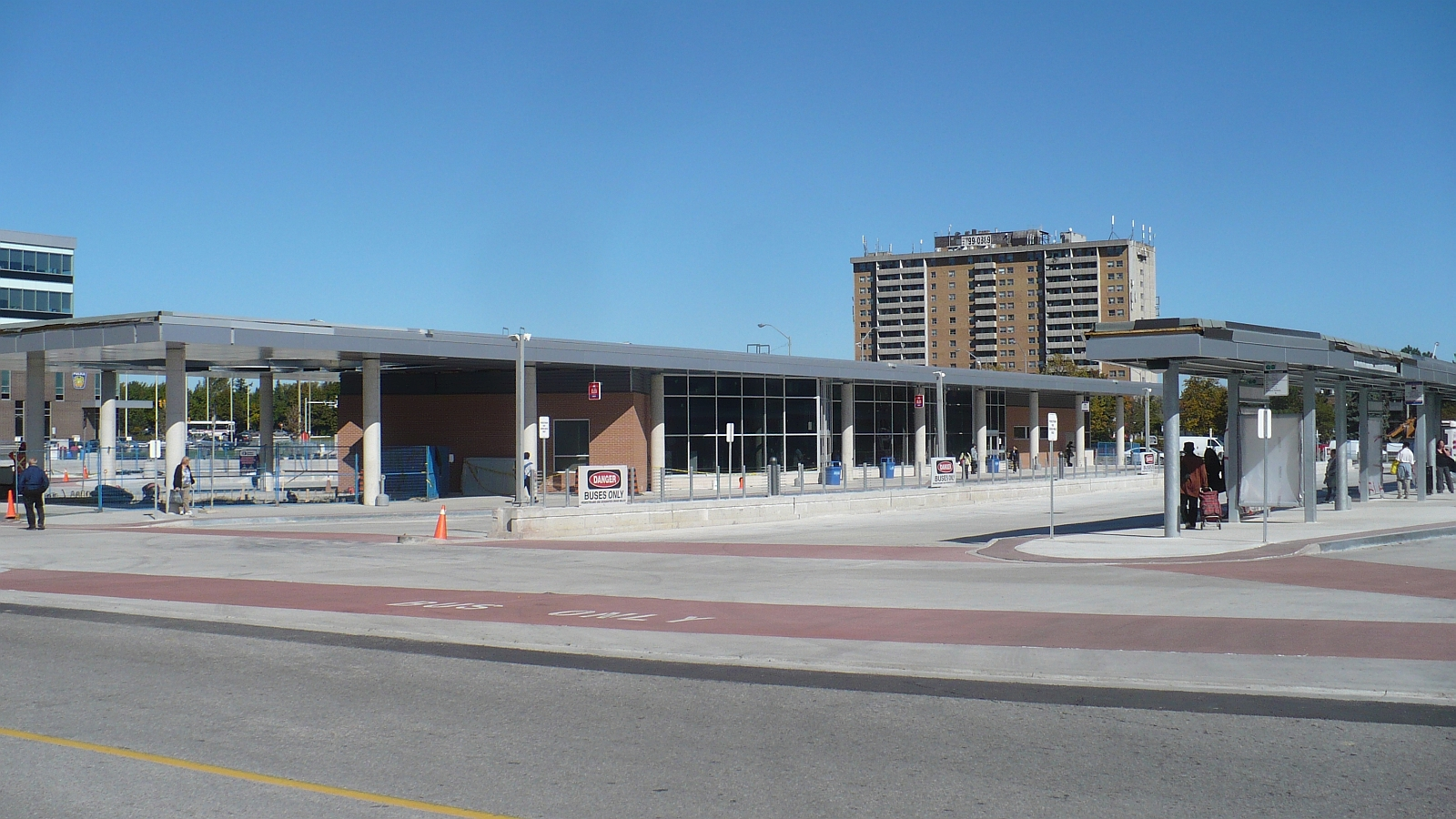

General information
- Location: 160 Central Park Drive
- Coordinates: 43°43′09″N 79°43′15″W
- Owner: City of Brampton
- Platforms: 18
- Bus operators: Brampton Transit (Züm); GO Transit

Construction
- Accessible: yes

Other information
- Station code: GO Transit: BLEA

History
- Opened: 1991
- Rebuilt: 2010
Location

Bramalea Terminal is a Brampton Transit bus station serving the community of Bramalea in Brampton, Ontario, Canada. It is located at the south west corner of Peel Centre Drive and Central Park Drive on the north side of the Brampton Civic Centre. The customer service centre building is situated in the northerly of two island platform areas, which are accessed by pedestrian cross walks. Within the building are service counters, washrooms, snack vending machines and a heated waiting area with screens displaying current bus route information.

== History ==
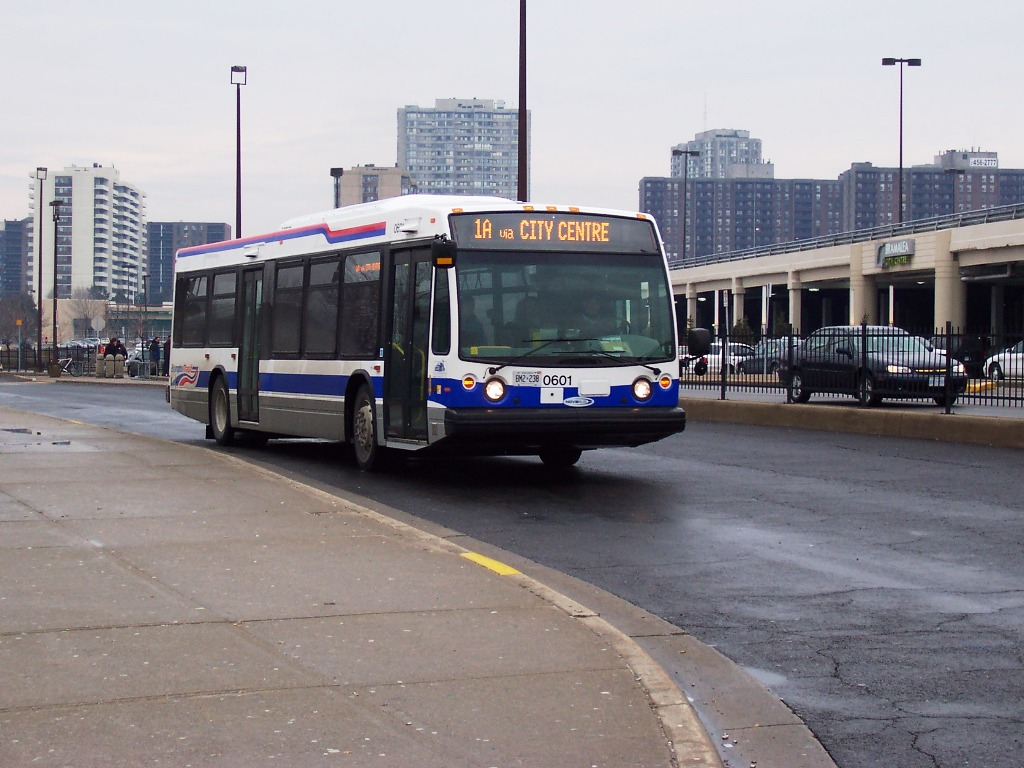
Nova Bus LFS in the old terminal on Clark Blvd. in 2006

Bus stops adjacent to Bramalea City Centre, referred to as City Centre Terminal, were replaced with a terminal opened September 25, 1991. This replaced a previous terminal, closer to the parking structure; when it rained, "water pours down from the car park above." That site, in use for almost two decades, was located on Clark Boulevard, on the south side of the mall. Mississauga's central transit hub was similarly named, as Mississauga City Centre Transit Terminal.

The City of Brampton issued a Request for Proposals due November 13, 2009, RFP 2009-078, "Construction of The New Bramalea City Centre Transit Terminal and Related Passenger Amenities Transit Priority Measures Road and Intersection Improvements". The estimated project value was $5,000,001 - $10,000,000, with a project team selected by Moffett & Duncan Architects Inc. M. J. Dixon Construction Limited was awarded the contract, for $7,542,150.00 including taxes, the lowest price by a qualified contractor, out of the eight bids received. Considered names for the station were "Brampton Transit – Bramalea Terminal", "Bramalea City Centre Transit Terminal", a variant of the existing branding, and "Brampton Transit – Queen East Terminal". The latter was noted to prevent Brampton Transit from using the name for possible future terminals further east on Queen Street. The first option, which was submitted to council for approval, was intended to "develop a new system wide guideline and protocol for the naming of its future terminals"

The terminal was relocated, as of 20 September 2010, now east of the mall. The spot was formerly a city owned parking lot for the Brampton Civic Centre, the location of Toronto Metropolitan University's School of Medicine. The new terminal opened in conjunction with the commencement of Züm bus rapid transit service along Queen Street.

The issue of pedestrian safety was highlighted soon after the terminal opened. While a crosswalk was just a short distance south of the station, many would cross Peel Centre Drive (running east–west) or Team Canada Drive (north–south) at random places along the edge of the station lot. In May 2011, city council approved the creation of a scramble intersection crossing, which would stop both directions of traffic while pedestrians can cross one road, or cross both by heading diagonally. Resident George Startup lobbied the city on the issue, which Brampton Safe City supported. Electrical issues delayed the installation of traffic lights at the intersection of Peel Centre Drive and Team Canada Drive, further adding to the issue.

With cement was cracking around the catch basins, and the southeast driveway apron cracked; as part of "standard contract procedure", the contractor was brought in to fix the deficiencies. Repairs on the facility began October 3, in the first of three phases, to end October 21, 2011. During part of the repair, stops were moved to Team Canada Drive and Peel Centre Drive.

Additional repairs, requiring closure, were made to the terminal in 2023.

== Bus routes ==
Brampton Transit bus routes

- 1/1A Queen
- 8 Centre
- 9 Vodden
- 10 South Industrial
- 12 Grenoble
- 13 Avondale
- 15/15A Bramalea
- 16 Southgate
- 17 Howden
- 18/18A Dixie
- 19 Fernforest
- 20/20A East Industrial
- 115 Airport Express (to Toronto Pearson International Airport)
- 205/217 St. Thomas Aquinas S.S.
- 207/208 Mayfield S.S.

Züm routes

- 501 Züm Queen

GO Transit bus routes

- 32 Brampton Trinity Common GO Bus
- 36 Brampton GO Bus

== Nearby landmarks ==
- 10 Peel Centre Drive, Region of Peel buildings including council chambers and offices, executive offices, and many other departments
- Bramalea City Centre, shopping mall, including a FreshCo grocery store nearby
- Brampton Civic Centre, municipal facility, including the Chinguacousy Branch of Brampton Library, Pearson Theatre, Peel Health services, etc. Formerly, it was the Township of Chinguacousy offices and City of Brampton offices.
- Chinguacousy Park
- Knightsbridge Senior Centre
