= Brampton Downtown Terminal =

Transit terminal in Brampton, Ontario

Downtown Terminal
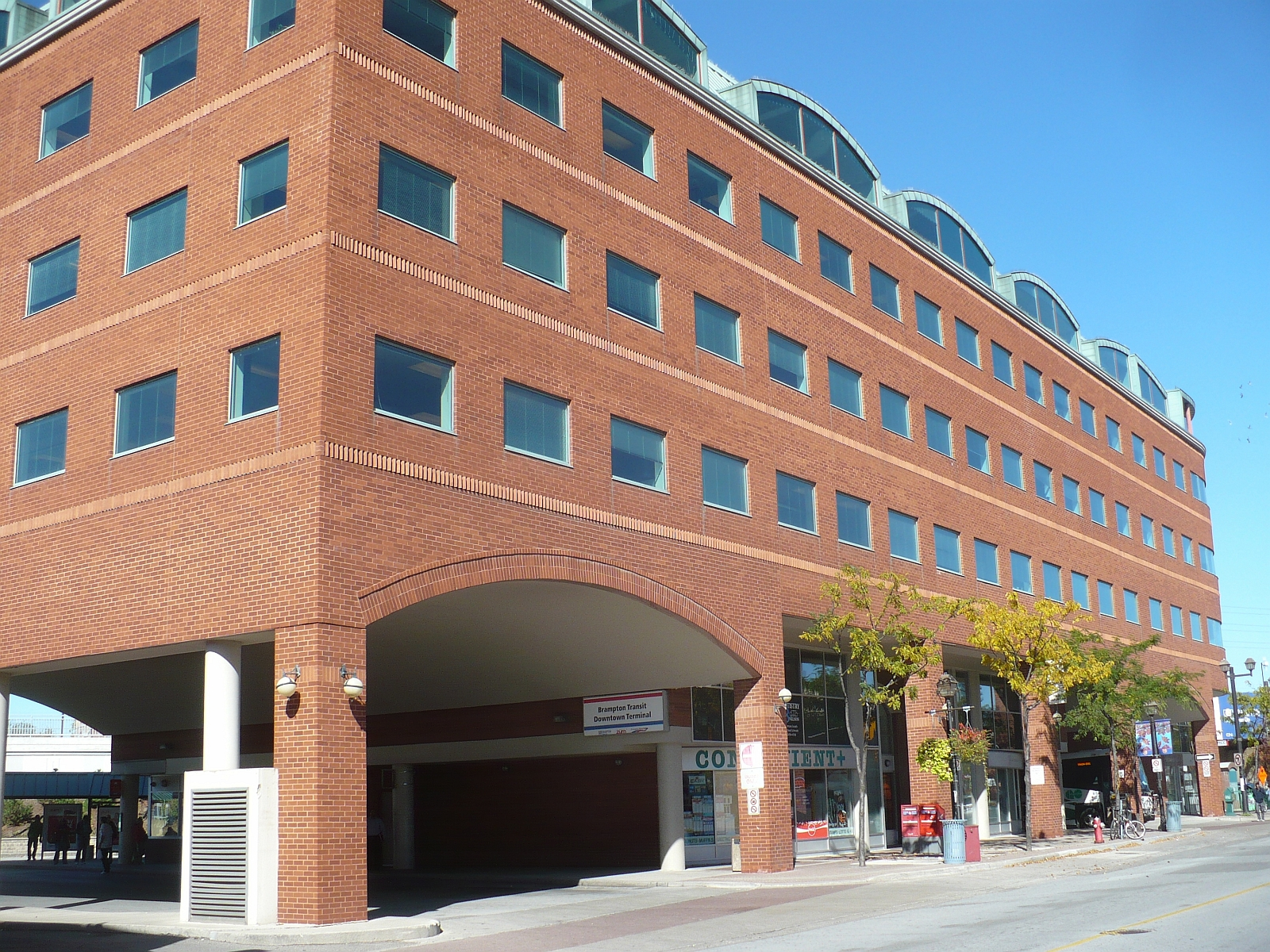

General information
- Other names: Brampton Bus Terminal
- Location: 8 Nelson Street, Brampton, Ontario; Canada
- Coordinates: 43°41′13″N 79°45′44″W
- Owner: City of Brampton
- Platforms: 9
- Bus operators: Brampton Transit (including Züm); GO Transit
- Connections: at Brampton GO Station

Construction
- Accessible: yes

Other information
- Station code: GO Transit: BRPT

History
- Opened: 1991
Location

Downtown Terminal (also known as Brampton Bus Terminal) is a Brampton Transit bus station serving the central area of Brampton, Ontario, Canada. It is located a block north of the intersection of Main Street and Queen Street, the two main streets in downtown. There is direct access to Via Rail and GO Transit trains at the adjoining Brampton GO Station. Municipal and private-sector partnerships funded this facility and built a six-storey office building above the transit terminal. A portion of the ground level of the building accommodates ticket sales and a heated waiting room.

== Bus routes ==
Brampton Transit

- 1/1A Queen
- 2 Main (Board at Main Street)
- 24 Van Kirk (Board at Main Street)
- 25 Edenbrook (Board at Main Street)
- 52 McMurchy

Züm

- 501 Züm Queen
- 502 Züm Main (Board at Main Street)
- 561 Züm Queen West

GO Transit

- 31 Kitchener GO Bus
- 33 Kitchener GO Bus
- 36 Brampton GO Bus
- 37 Orangeville GO Bus

Greyhound (originally Gray Coach Lines) formerly served the terminal on its route from Toronto via Orangeville and Shelburne to Owen Sound. The route was discontinued in early 2010.
