= Lisgar GO Station =

Railway station in Mississauga, Ontario, Canada

Lisgar
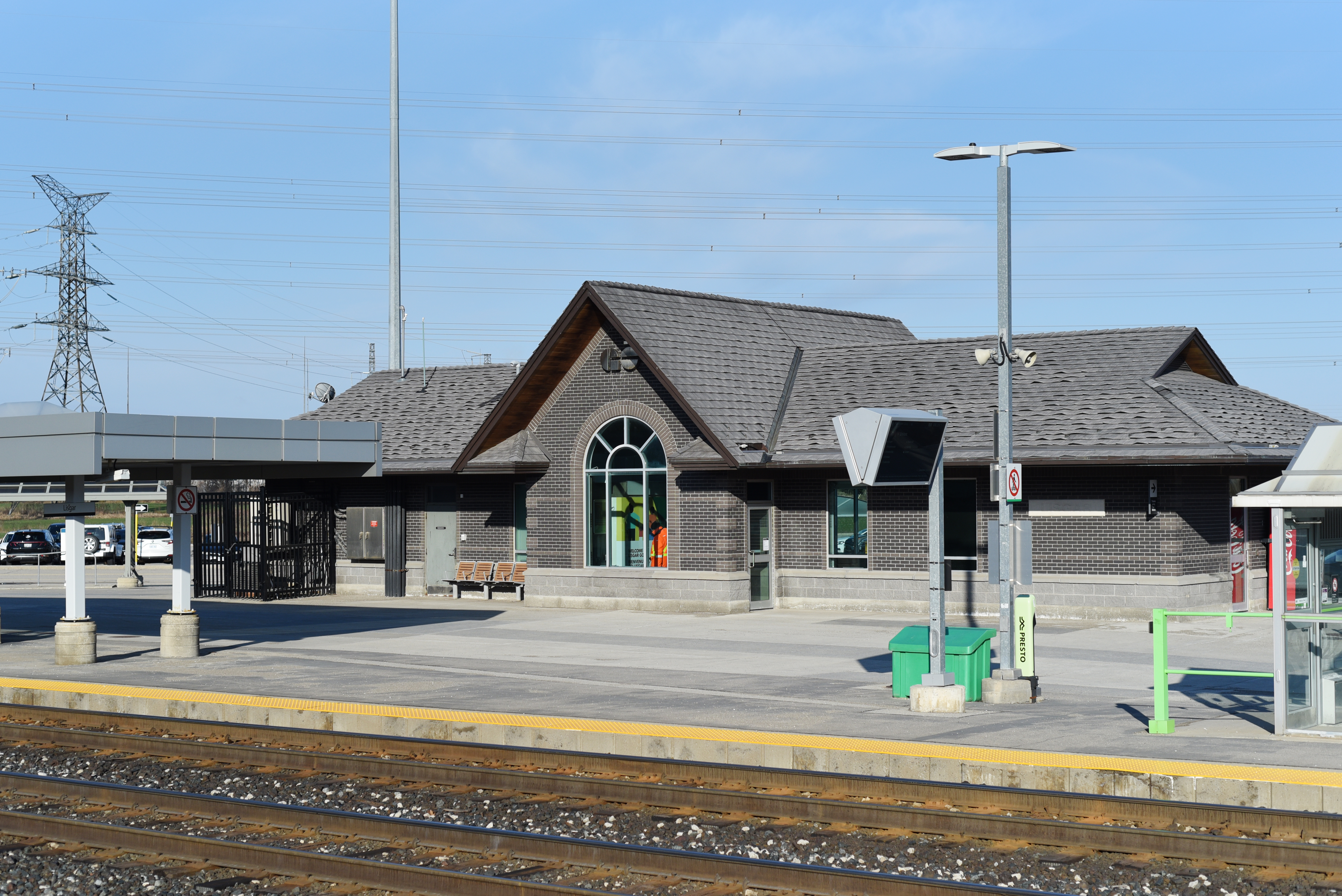
- Platform and station building in 2026

General information
- Location: 3250 Argentia Road; Mississauga, Ontario; Canada
- Coordinates: 43°35′27″N 79°47′19″W
- Owner: Metrolinx
- Platforms: 1 island platform (train); 6 bus bays
- Tracks: 2
- Bus routes: 21
- Connections: MiWay; Brampton Transit: 511; Milton Transit

Construction
- Structure type: Brick station building
- Parking: 788 spaces
- Cycle facilities: Yes
- Accessible: Yes

Other information
- Station code: GO Transit: LS
- Fare zone: 23

History
- Opened: 4 September 2007

Services
Preceding station	GO Transit	Following station
Milton Terminus	Milton	Meadowvale towards Union
Former services at CP station
Preceding station	Canadian Pacific Railway	Following station
Hornby toward Detroit	Detroit – Montreal	Streetsville Junction toward Montreal Windsor
Location

Lisgar GO Station is a railway station on GO Transit's Milton line in Mississauga, Ontario, Canada. It opened for service on September 4, 2007.

The station is located at Argentia Road and Tenth Line, near the interchange of Highway 401, and Highway 407. It is named after the Lisgar neighbourhood in which it is located, which is itself named after Lord Lisgar, second Governor General of Canada from 1869–1872.

The station was built to alleviate the congested Meadowvale GO Station and to provide better service for the local community. The station provides parking spaces for 788 vehicles. Construction began on new canopies, walkways, and shelters in August 2014 and was completed in early 2015.

In spring 2009, a 50 kW wind turbine was constructed at the station and was expected to supply up to 80% of the station's power. Taking advantage of the heavy prevailing winds from the west, the turbine is the first application of on-site wind generation for a North American transit system. However, after four years, the turbine was only producing 9% of its projected output.

== Connecting buses ==
MiWay

- 38 Creditview

Brampton Transit

- 11 Steeles
- 511 Züm Steeles

Milton Transit

- 21 Steeles

GO Transit

- 21 Milton/Toronto
