= 561 Züm Queen West =

Bus rapid transit route in Brampton, Ontario

561

Overview
- System: Züm
- Vehicle: New Flyer Xcelsior

Route
- Locale: 1 Queen
- Communities served: Brampton
- Start: Mount Pleasant GO Station
- Via: Mississauga Road and Queen Street
- End: Downtown Brampton Terminal
- Length: 6 miles (9.7 km)

Service
- Frequency: 30 minutes
- Journey time: 20-25 minutes
- Operates: Monday-Friday

561 Züm Queen West is a bus rapid transit route in Brampton, Ontario that was introduced on September 6, 2016 as part of Züm phase 2. It runs from Mount Pleasant GO Station where it connects with 505 Züm Bovaird and continues west along Bovaird Drive, south along Mississauga Road, and east along Queen Street to Downtown Brampton Terminal. The route currently operates only on weekdays during rush hours.The 1 Queen shares the entire length with this route and operates 30 minutes or better all day, every day.

The 561 was suspended due to the COVID-19 pandemic in the Regional Municipality of Peel. As of September 6, 2022, Route 561 has been restored to service.

== Stops ==
| Name | Opening Date | Local Parallel Routes | Major Connections |
|---|---|---|---|
| Mount Pleasant GO Station | September 6, 2016 | 1 Queen, 60 Mississauga Road | 505 Züm Bovaird, GO Transit |
| Bovaird | September 6, 2016 | 1 Queen, 60 Mississauga Road | GO Transit |
| Williams | September 6, 2016 | 1 Queen, 60 Mississauga Road | |
| Settlers Field/Beacon Hill | August 4, 2026 | 1 Queen, 60 Mississauga Road | |
| Mississauga | September 6, 2016 | 1 Queen | |
| Creditview | September 6, 2016 | 1 Queen | |
| James Potter | September 6, 2016 | 1 Queen, 53A Ray Lawson | |
| Chinguacousy | September 6, 2016 | 1 Queen | |
| McLaughlin | September 6, 2016 | 1/1A Queen, 57 Charolais | |
| McMurchy | September 6, 2016 | 1/1A Queen | |
| Downtown Brampton Terminal | September 6, 2016 | 1/1A Queen | 501 Züm Queen, 502 Züm Main, GO Transit |

== Controversy ==
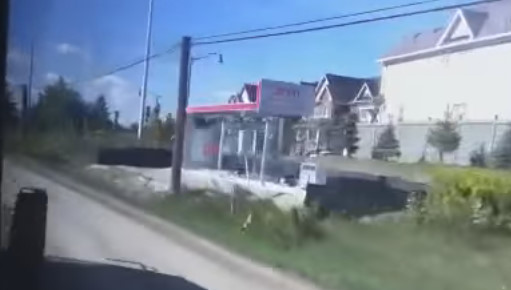
Disabled Züm station at Queen Street and James Potter Road

At that time when this route was implemented, several widening projects including Queen Street west of Chinguacousy, Mississauga Road north of Williams Parkway, and Bovaird Drive west of Mount Pleasant GO station were still ongoing and was not finished until November 2017. As a result, some of the Züm stations including Bovaird, Creditview, and James Potter were still unopened and was not expected to open until the widening project is complete because the road's width did not reach the Züm stations. Instead, temporary bus stops were placed nearby disabled Züm stations along the route. Also, heavy traffic and construction activities could result in bus delays along the route.
