= 505 Züm Bovaird =

Bus rapid transit route in Brampton, Ontario

505

Overview
- System: Züm
- Vehicle: New Flyer Xcelsior

Route
- Locale: 5/5A Bovaird, 30 Airport Rd; 7 Airport, 52B/D Lawrence West (MiWay)
- Communities served: Brampton, Mississauga
- Start: Mount Pleasant GO Station
- Via: Bovaird Drive and Airport Road
- End: Viscount Station
- Length: 26 kilometres (16 mi)

Service
- Frequency: 15-20 Minutes
- Operates: Monday-Sunday

505 Züm Bovaird is a bus rapid transit route serving Brampton and the neighbouring city of Mississauga in Ontario, Canada. This route began service on September 2, 2014. The headways are 15-17 minutes during peak periods, 16 minutes during weekends, and 20 minutes during weekday off peak. This route does not operate during early mornings on Sundays and late evenings on all days. This route duplicates service with 5 Bovaird and 5A Bovaird (between Mount Pleasant GO and Airport Road) before turning south and duplicating with the 30 Airport Road, and 5A Bovaird.

After terminating at the Airport Loop (Queen Street & Goreway Drive) during the route's initial run, a southern extension along Airport Road was added on September 4, 2018. The route terminated at Malton GO Station, just south of Derry Road in Mississauga. Also on the same day, the route no longer interlined with Route 561 Züm Queen West. A new branch, 505A was added on October 31, 2022. The branch ran from Trinity Common Terminal to Viscount station on the Terminal Link train which services Pearson Airport. As of June 29, 2026, the 505A branch was removed, and was replaced by an extension of the regular 505 Züm Bovaird branch to Viscount Station, adding all week service to Viscount Station, and removing service to Malton GO Station.

== Stops ==
	Stations				
Route	Name	Opening Date	Municipality	Local/Other Parallel Routes	Connections
505	Mount Pleasant GO Station	September 2, 2014	Brampton	5/5A Bovaird, 4C Chingacousy, 9 Vodden	GO Transit, 561 Züm Queen West
505	Worthington/Lake Louise	September 2, 2014	Brampton	5/5A Bovaird, 4C Chingacousy, 9 Vodden	GO Transit
505	Chinguacousy	September 2, 2014	Brampton	5/5A Bovaird, 9 Vodden	GO Transit
505	McLaughlin	September 2, 2014	Brampton	5/5A Bovaird	GO Transit
505	Main	September 2, 2014	Brampton	5/5A Bovaird	502 Züm Main, GO Transit
505	Kennedy	September 2, 2014	Brampton	5/5A Bovaird	
505	Heart Lake/Southlake	September 2, 2014	Brampton	5/5A Bovaird	
505	Trinity Common Terminal	September 2, 2014	Brampton	5/5A Bovaird	GO Transit
505	Dixie	September 2, 2014	Brampton	5/5A Bovaird	
505	Bramalea	September 2, 2014	Brampton	5/5A Bovaird	
505	Brampton Civic Hospital	September 2, 2014	Brampton	5/5A Bovaird, 35 Clarkway	
505	Torbram	September 2, 2014	Brampton	5/5A Bovaird, 12 Grenoble, 35 Clarkway	
505	Airport Road	September 2, 2014	Brampton	5/5A Bovaird, 35 Clarkway	
505	Cottrelle/North Park	September 4, 2018	Brampton	5A Bovaird, 30 Airport Road	
505	Williams	September 4, 2018	Brampton	5A Bovaird, 30 Airport Road	
505	Queen	September 4, 2018	Brampton	5A Bovaird, 30 Airport Road	501 Zum Queen
505	Woodslea/Intermodal	September 4, 2018	Brampton	5A Bovaird, 30 Airport Road, 20A East Industrial	
505	Steeles	September 4, 2018	Brampton	5A Bovaird, 30 Airport Road, 20A East Industrial	511 Zum Steeles
505	Morning Star	September 4, 2018	Mississauga	5A Bovaird, 30 Airport Road; 7 Airport (MiWay), 52B Lawrence West (TTC)	MiWay, TTC
505	Hull	September 4, 2018	Mississauga	7 Airport, 24 Northwest, 30 Rexdale (MiWay), 52B/52D Lawrence West (TTC)	MiWay, TTC
505	Derry (International Centre)	October 31, 2022	Mississauga	7 Airport (MiWay), 52B Lawrence West (TTC)	MiWay, TTC
505	American Drive/Airport Rd	October 31, 2022	Mississauga	7 Airport (MiWay), 52B Lawrence West (TTC)	MiWay, TTC
505	American Drive/Viscount (WB only)	October 31, 2022	Mississauga	107 Malton Express (MiWay), 906 Airport-Humber College Express (TTC)	MiWay, TTC
505	Viscount Terminal Link station	October 31, 2022	Mississauga	107 Malton Express (MiWay), 906 Airport-Humber College Express (TTC)	MiWay, TTC
