= Transportation in Markham, Ontario =

The city of Markham, in Ontario, Canada, offers a complex transportation infrastructure that includes airports, highways, public transit, regional roads, municipality-funded roads, and train services.

== Air ==
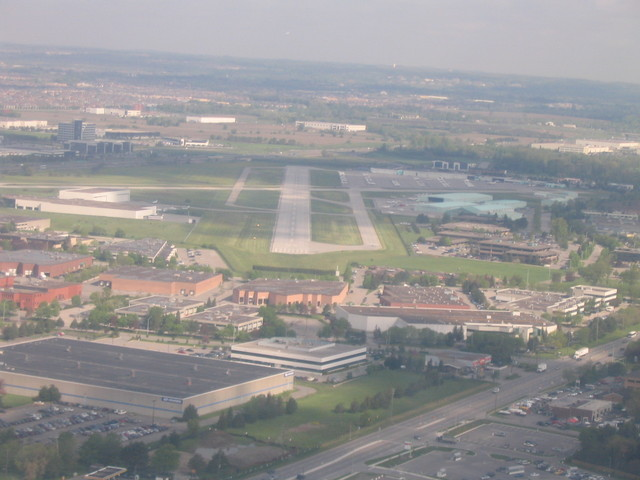
Buttonville Airport, looking from above.

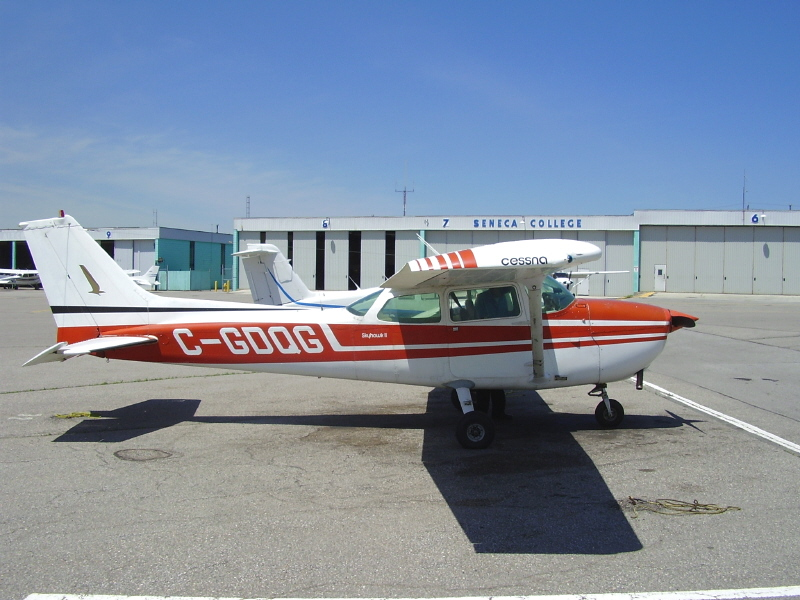
One of the training planes.

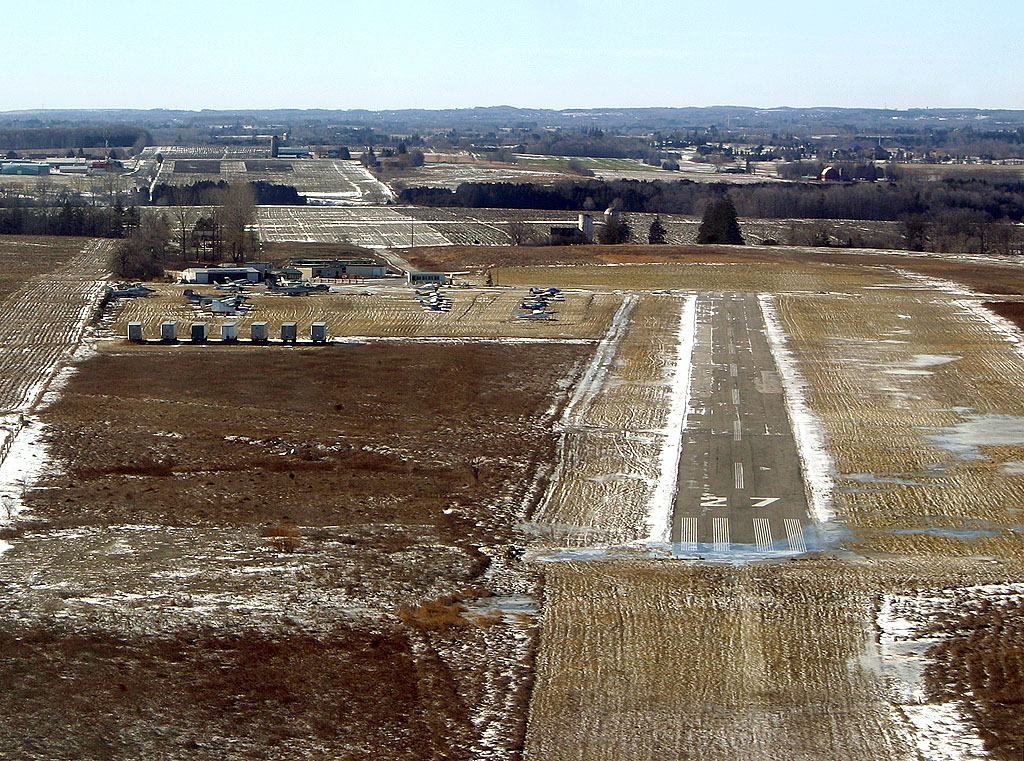
Markham Airport, looking from above.

Markham's proximity to Toronto makes its residents use Toronto Pearson International Airport to travel to various international destinations. However, the city of Markham has a local alternative to Pearson.

There are two airports in Markham, operated by two different operators. They are Toronto/Buttonville Municipal Airport and Toronto/Markham Airport. Their names are signed under Toronto because of Markham's proximity to Toronto.

Operated by Toronto Airways Limited, Toronto/Buttonville Municipal Airport is Canada's 8th busiest airport by aircraft movement in 2006. The airport is located at the city's west end, at 16th Avenue and Highway 404.

Buttonville Municipal Airport is privately owned until the licence expires in 2010. The Greater Toronto Airport Authority (GTAA) has plans to cease airport operation in 2011 and redirect Markham residents will use the nearby Pickering Airport in Pickering. In 2010, Toronto Airways announced the gradual closure of the airport (by 2017) and redevelopment of the airport site. As Pickering Airport remains unbuilt, tenants and users will need to find an alternate site. Owners of the current airport hope to relocate somewhere within York Region.

Buttonville Municipal Airport offers domestic flights and flights for United States destinations. Operators using the airport include NexJet Aviation Inc, Million Air, Executive Edge Air Charter, Aviation Limited and Canadian Flyers International. The airport also offers flight school hosted by the Seneca Community College.

The Toronto/Markham Airport is located at the northeastern end of the city, at Highway 48 and 19th Avenue. It is operated privately by Markham Airport Incorporated and owned by the Thomson family. Further growth of this airport is being explored.

There is only one heliport in Markham. The Toronto/Markham Stouffville heliport is located on the roof of the Markham Stouffville Hospital in the eastern end of city, at Highway 7 and Bur Oak Avenue. The heliport is privately owned, with ownership shared between Markham and Whitchurch-Stouffville. The pad will move to the roof when the new hospital expansion is completed in 2014.

== Cycling ==
Pavement marked a lane

Cyclists and motorists share a lane.

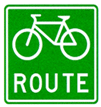
Pavement unmarked

Markham designated almost 400 km as "Cycling devoted routes" as part of the city's Master Cycling Plan. There are three primary cycling route signs. The first one, which displays a diamond and a bicycle, indicates an exclusive bicycle lane for cyclists.

The second sign is a green sign with a bicycle on top, and is the most frequent sign across Markham. Roads bearing this sign have no specially marked bicycle lane, but have other lanes wide enough for motorists and cyclists to comfortably share a lane.

The third sign is the rarest of all, with a car on the left side, a cyclist on the right, and a sign saying "Share the road". This sign is located on busy road where it is narrow enough that motorists and cyclists have to share a lane.

The Markham Council proposed a final draft of the "Cycling Master Plan" in 2007. The plan would be put in place in the next 15 years. The plan includes designating various major municipal roads into the following categories:

- Signed-Only Routes : On-road bicycle routes denoted strictly with bicycle route signs with no other physical changes to the roadway geometry. Users share the pavement with motor vehicles. There are no special lane designations.
- Bike Lanes and Paved Shoulder Bikeways : Facilities located in the traveled portion of the roadway and designed for one-way cyclist traffic. Bike lanes are typically located on urban streets with curbs, and paved shoulders are typically used to accommodate cyclists on rural cycling routes where no curbs exist.
- Multi-Use Trails : Facilities that are separate from the traveled portion of a roadway. They may take the form of a boulevard trail in a public road right-of-way, or a greenway completely separate from roads. The proposed cycling network will expand on the spine network developed as part of the first phase this study and is intended to provide access to existing and proposed utilitarian and recreational cycling routes and trail systems in the Town of Markham and adjacent municipalities.

== Public transport ==
Within the city of Markham, Toronto Transit Commission (TTC), Viva (a type of bus rapid transit), and York Region Transit (YRT) offers public transit services for the local residents. Since 1973, Markham has been providing a public transit of its own, namely Markham Transit, and was funded by the municipal government. In 2001, the York Regional government "merged" the Markham Transit with 4 other municipal-managed transit systems to form York Region Transit. In 2005, York Region Transit launched Viva, which operated in parts of Markham on Yonge Street and Highway 7. In addition, GO Transit provide passenger trains and shuttles to help commuters to get to their work.

=== Early modesL 1897–1977 ===
The Thornhill area of Markham was served by Metropolitan Street Railway Company from 1897 to 1930 (renamed Toronto and York Radial Railway Metropolitan Division in 1904 and Simcoe line by the TTC from 1927) and then by North Yonge Railways from 1930 to 1948.

After radial rail service ended in 1948, the TTC North Yonge buses took over. The route was renamed as 59 North Yonge in 1956 and eliminated in 1977, when the 97 Yonge buses began with service to Steeles only. GO Transit gradually replaced the TTC buses with Newmarket B/Route 62 and Yonge C/Route 63 in 1975.

=== GO Bus ===
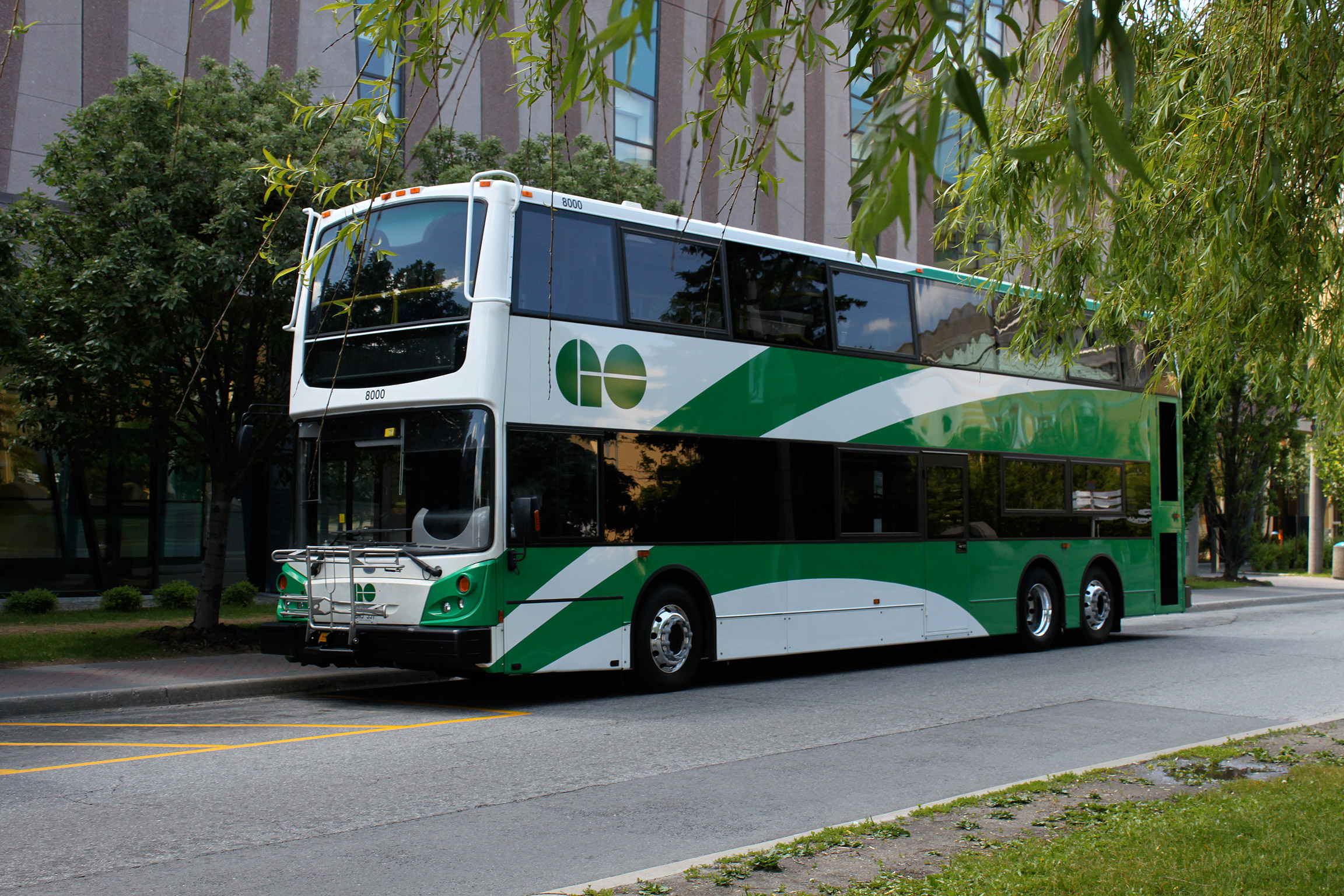
A Highway 407 GO bus at York University

Because GO Transit only train service to Markham only during rush hours, and GO train stations are not very frequent, GO buses serve as a popular alternative. GO operates east–west bus service through the city along Highway 407 ETR and shuttle bus service to Downtown Toronto when the Stouffville line is not running. GO buses also connect with other YRT routes and TTC routes.

GO buses also extend the service area of the GO trains. In Markham, there are only two lines independent of trains, one operating on Highway 7, linking Brampton and Markham, and the other one is the York University express, operating on Highway 407.

GO Transit is developing an east–west bus rapid transit line, called the 407 Transitway across Markham. It will consist of buses operating on a bus-only road, serving destinations such as Downtown Markham, Richmond Hill Centre and Vaughan Metropolitan Centre.

=== Toronto Transit Commission ===
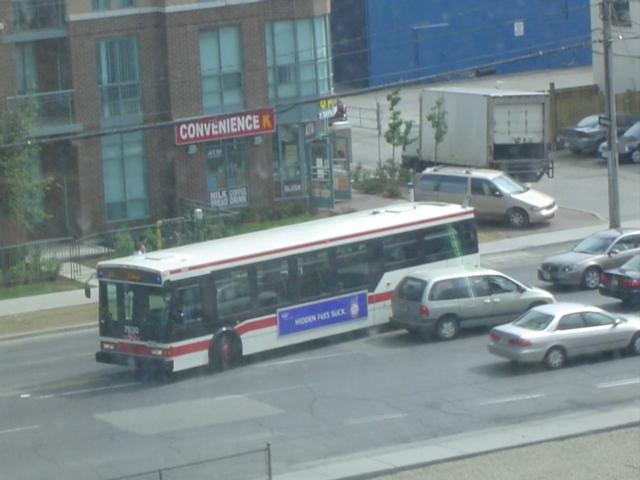
An Orion VII diesel bus operated by the Toronto Transit Commission

Markham's proximity to Toronto makes some bus routes in Markham operated by the Toronto Transit Commission (TTC). They are called the "TTC contracted routes operating within York Region," connect to subway or RT stations in Toronto, and thus help to connect Markham (or the whole York Region) with Toronto.

There are a total of 4 TTC contracted bus routes operating within Markham. There is a special fare policy to go with the special contracted bus program. A passenger who boards a TTC contracted bus route in York Region and travels within York Region must pay according to the YRT's fare policy and is entitled to another free ride of other York Region Transit/Viva operated bus routes, or TTC-contracted bus routes (if the passenger does not travel into Toronto). A passenger who boards a TTC-contracted bus route in York Region and travel into Toronto pays an extra fare (the YRT fare and the TTC fare). The passenger is entitled for a free ride on the subway or RT or streetcars or TTC bus routes operating within Toronto. A passenger who enters York Region again must pay another fare for the YRT.

In 2017, York Region began serving Toronto's Line 1 Yonge–University subway. In 2017, Vaughan was the first one to be served, and in the next decade, both Markham and Richmond Hill will be served on Yonge Street.

=== York Region Transit ===
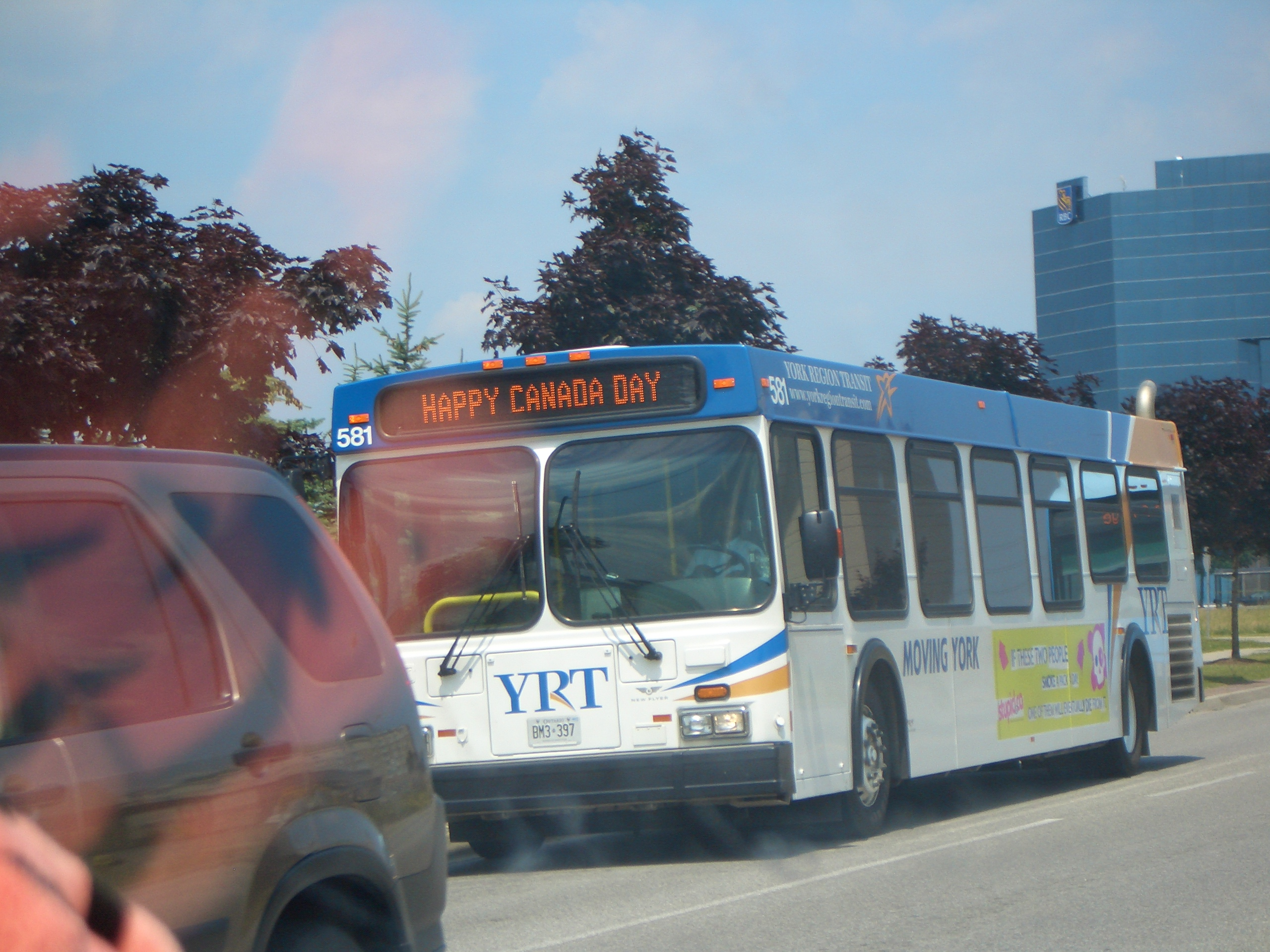
A YRT bus.

Markham Transit was merged with four other municipally managed transit systems in 2001 to form York Region Transit (YRT). York Region Transit serves Markham with over 40 routes. Most bus routes operate on arterial roads throughout Markham, which are laid in a grid.

YRT has a cash fare of $4.00 but discounted tickets are available in packs of 10 in some stores. YRT fare applies to all York Region Transit, Viva, Brampton Transit and Toronto Transit Commission routes within York Region, with the exception of five express routes.

As well as local service, YRT provides two different types of express services in Markham. The 91E Bayview Express is a limited-stop branch of the 91 Bayview bus, operates along Bayview, and requires regular YRT fare. The 300 (Business Express), 301 (Markham Express), 302 (Unionville Express), 303 (Bur Oak Express), and 304 (Mount Joy Express) are express routes that travel from Markham to Finch Bus Terminal via Highway 407 and require a YRT express fare.

YRT has two major terminals in Markham: Unionville GO Terminal and Markham Stouffville Hospital Bus Terminal. The new Cornell Terminal will be located on Rose Way, near Ninth Line and Highway 7. Construction began by Summer 2018 and is be completed by late 2019, which will result in a major restructuring of routes in Markham. This new bus terminal will replace the transit hub along Church Street at Country Glen Road.

=== Viva ===
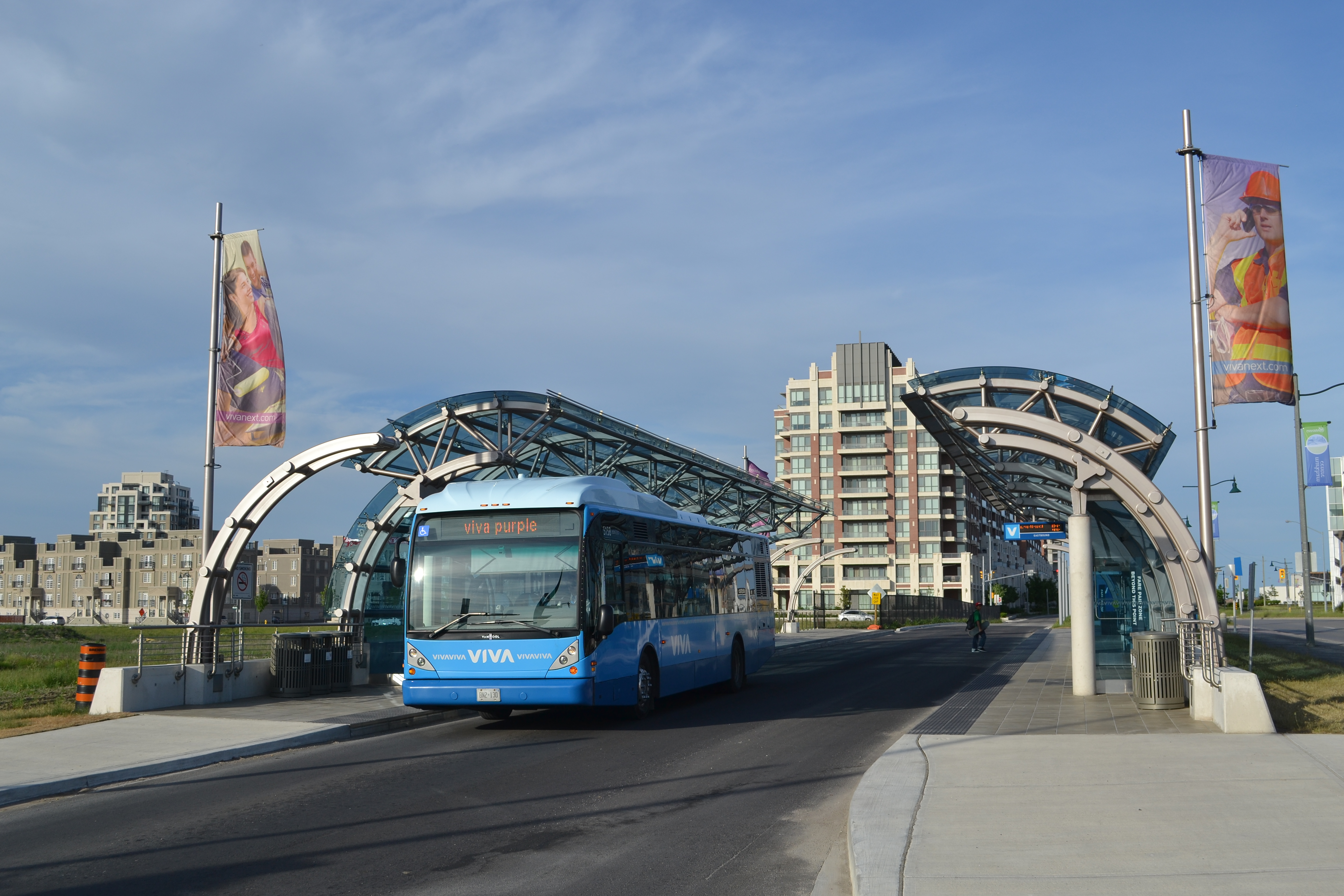
A Viva bus.

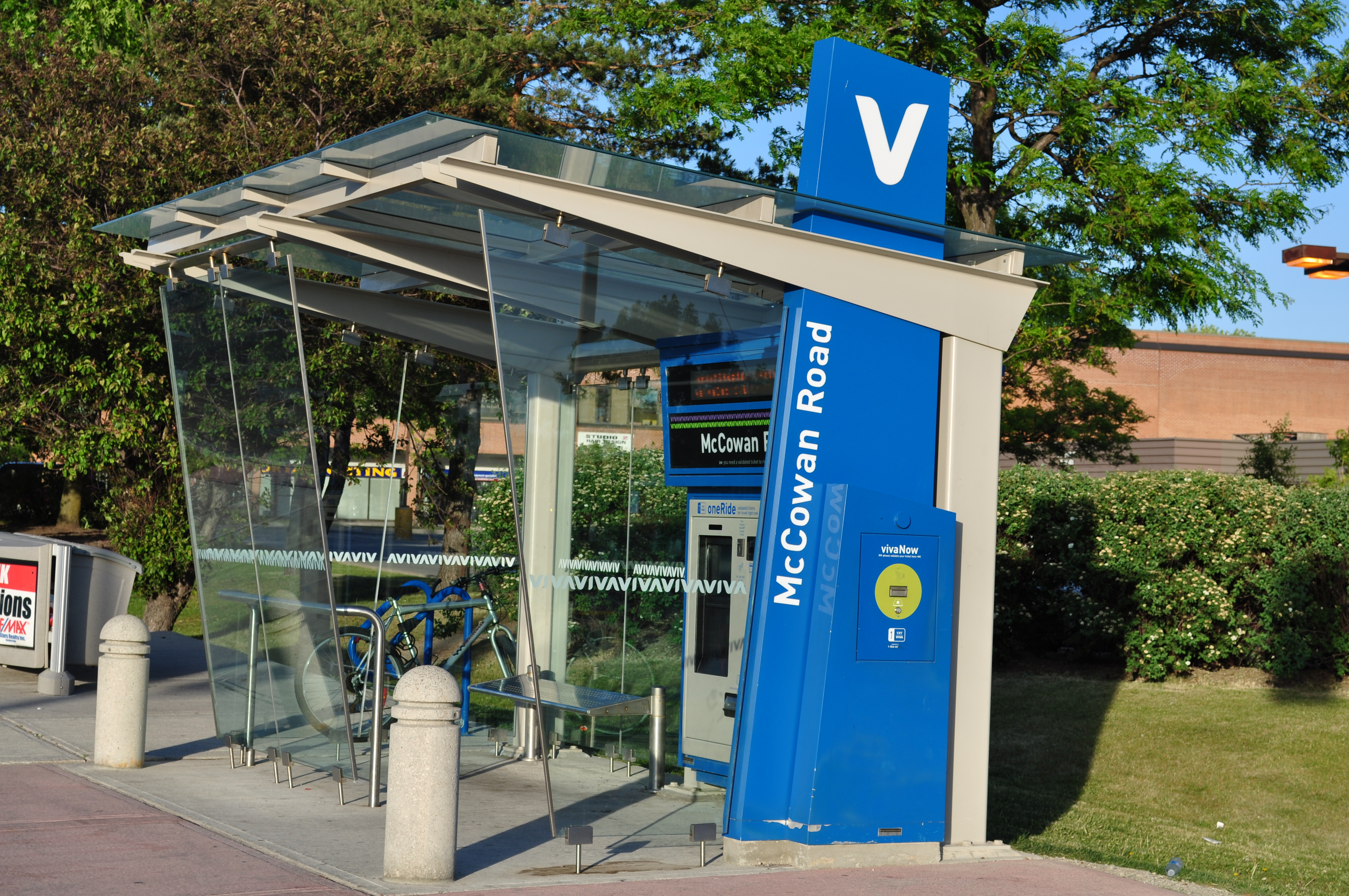
McCowan Vivastation

A map of the Viva bus routes effective winter 2015–16

The increase in congestion on York Region's roads made York Region Transit launch an express bus service, called "Viva," on September 4, 2005. Viva buses stop sonly at Vivastations, which are specially designed bus stops that incorporate a ticket vending machine and a ticket validator (Viva uses a proof-of-payment fare system to speed up boarding times), as well as a real-time display, which predicts when YRT and Viva buses arrive at the stop. Most Vivastations are blue, but several stops have a bronze design referred to as "vivavintage" to better suit the historic areas, especially along Yonge Street in Thornhill. Where there is limited space, miniature "vivamicro" stations are used. Viva abides by YRT's fare policy.

Viva is the brand name for the York Region Rapid Transit Plan and was funded through a public-private partnership (P3) consortium, the York Region Rapid Transit Corporation. York Region has control over all fares and service planning. Viva service is integrated with York Region Transit's conventional transit service and operated as one regional transit system (1system) that enables customers to travel across the Region.

The system opened to the public in four stages. The second phase was opened on October 16, 2005, the third phase was opened on November 20, 2005, and the first part of the fourth phase was opened on January 2, 2006 (the Cornell extension is the second part of Phase 4).

There are 4 Viva lines operating within Markham: Viva Blue (on Yonge Street), Viva Purple (on Highway 7), Viva Green, and Viva Pink (an alternative to Viva Blue and Viva Purple at peak hours).

Viva bus lines operate using a separate fleet of blue NovaBus and Van Hool buses. When Viva buses are behind schedule, they are given priority at traffic signals improves their efficiency. Buses operate 18 hours a day, 7 days a week, and 365 days a year and are every 5 to 25 minutes.

Viva is being upgraded to bus rapid transit with the construction of bus-only lanes along Highway 7, Yonge Street, Davis Drive, and Enterprise Drive. Viva is also considering extending its route into the fast-growing community of Cornell, in eastern Markham.

=== Paratransit ===
York Region Transit Mobility Plus provides paratransit services to those with mobility needs in the region that offer transport in York Region and some trips within Toronto.

== Rail ==
=== Passenger ===
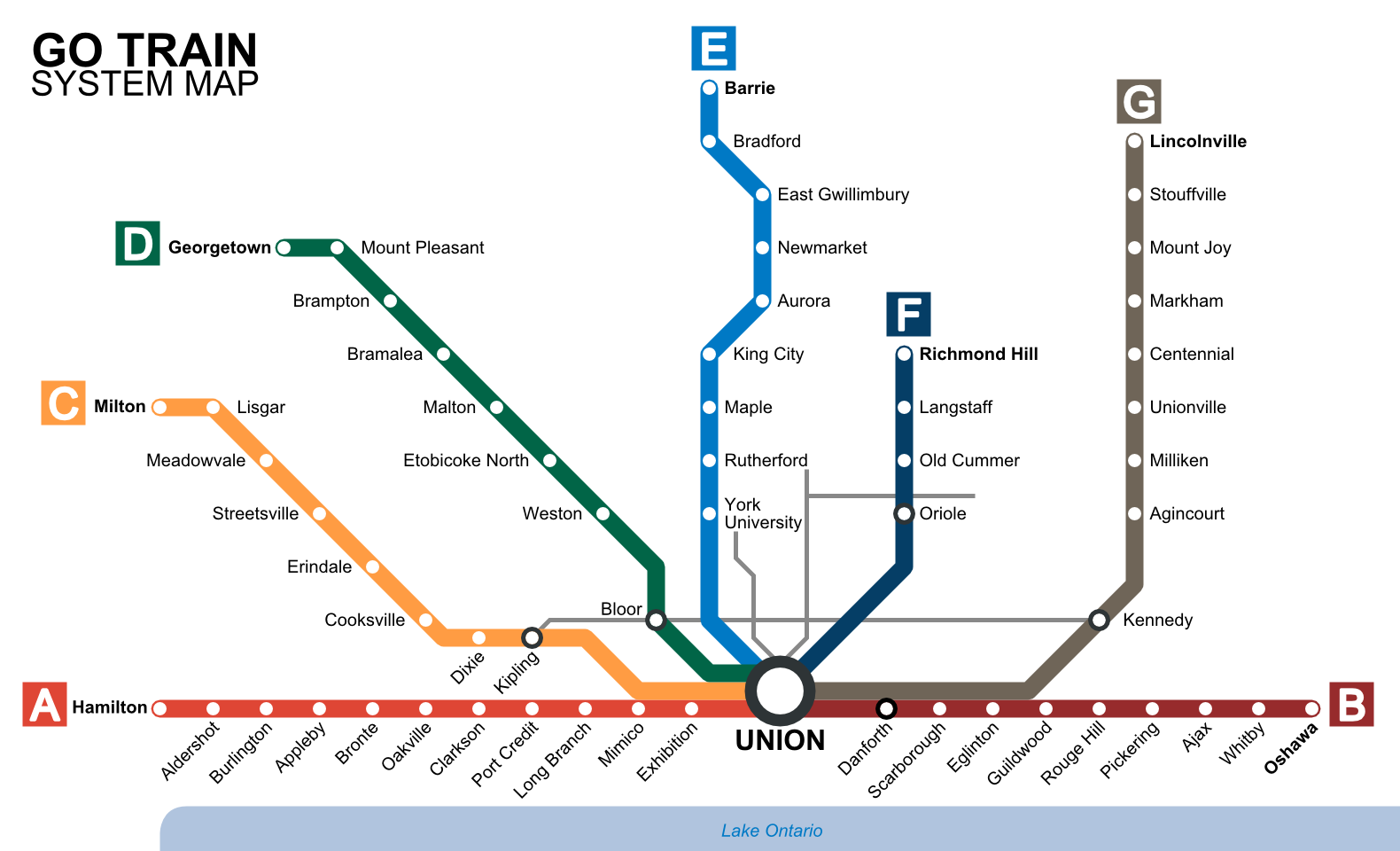
GO train system map

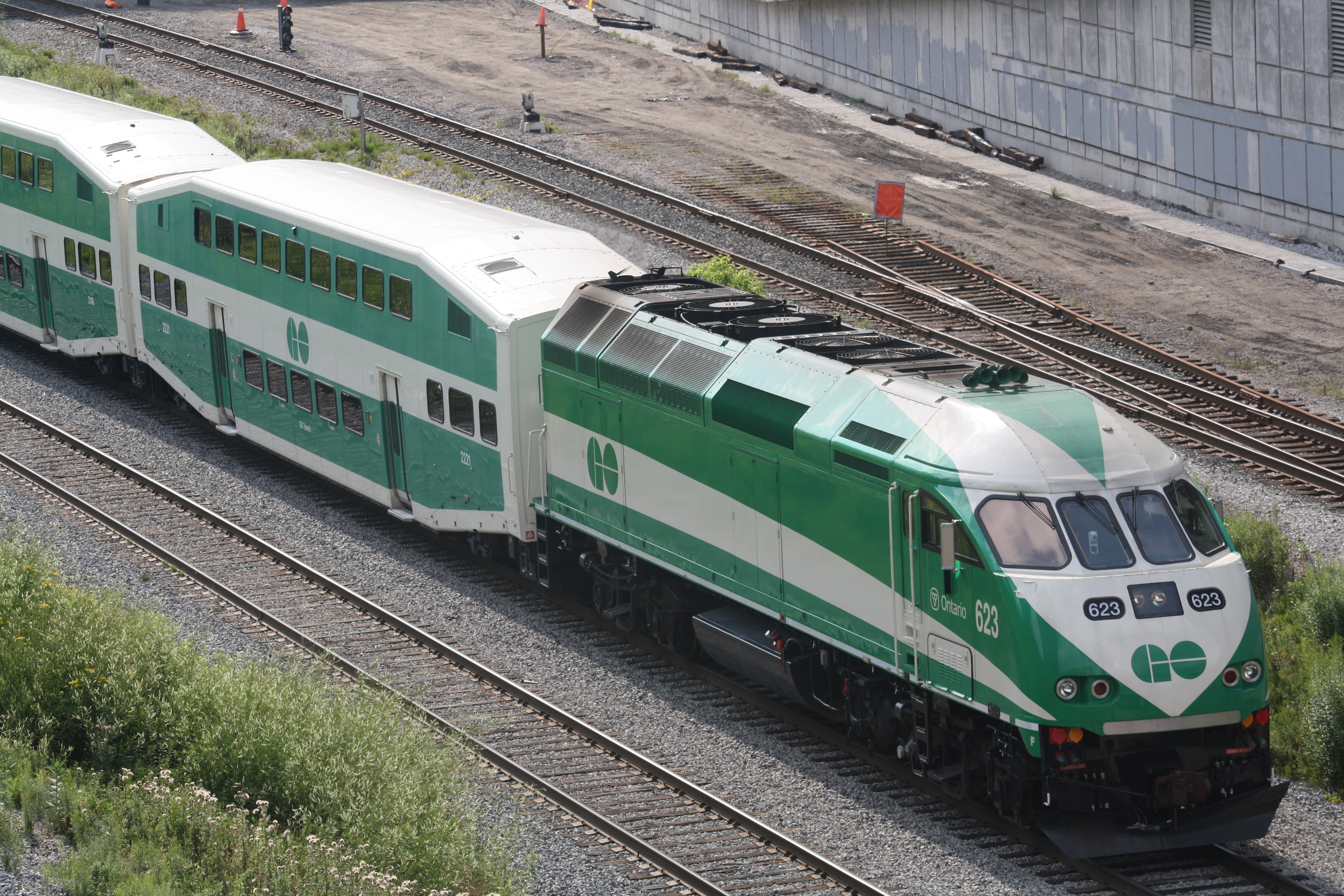
A GO train

Passenger rail service in Markham is provided by the GO Transit Stouffville line, which is a commuter rail line stretching from Lincolnville to Toronto The line operates only at rush hour and uses tracks owned by Metrolinx, the provincial transit agency. Five stations on the Stouffville line serve Markham, and four are within its municipal boundaries.

- Unionville (Enterprise Drive and Main Street Unionville), a major YRT and GO terminal. Connects to various YRT bus lines, Viva Blue, Viva Pink (rush hour only), Viva Purple, and Viva Green.
- Centennial (McCowan Road and Bullock Drive)
- Markham (Main Street Markham North and Bullock Drive), the oldest train station in Markham and itself an attraction of the town. It is originally a station of the Toronto and Nipissing Railway.
- Mount Joy (Highway 48 and Bur Oak Avenue)

Milliken (Steeles Avenue & Kennedy Road) was located in Markham from 1982 to 2005 but is now relocated beside Splendid China Tower, in Toronto.

GO's Richmond Hill line cuts through Markham, but there are no stops located within the city.

=== Freight ===
There are two major freight railways in the City of Markham: the Canadian National Railway (CN) and the Canadian Pacific Railway (CPR).

CNR has the most lines (York, Uxbridge and Bala Subdivisions) across Markham and primarily serves the south end of Markham.

CPR is mainly located in the southeastern end of the town with a single line (Havelock Subdivision).

Both CNR and CPR are responsible for freight trains servicing Markham and thus help goods produced in the city get delivered to the rest of the country.

== Roads ==
In terms of road systems, Markham is strongly influenced by its southerly neighbour, Toronto. Like Toronto, Markham inherits a grid-like road network that is funded by three levels of government. The government of Ontario funds the provincial highways across the town, York Region funds most of its arterial and main routes throughout the town, and Markham funds all local routes and some arterial routes.

=== Provincial highways ===
An Ontario King's Highways shield

The Ontario government funded only certain roads across Markham as Ontario provincial highways, including Highways 7, 48, and 404. Highway 404 serves as a major expressway linking Markham, Newmarket, and Downtown Toronto. Prior to the massive 1998 downloading, the Ontario government also funded Highway 11 (now York Regional Road 1, locally known as Yonge Street).

==== Downloading in 1997–1998 and effects on Markham ====
In 1997 and 1998, the Ontario government downloaded parts of Highways 7 (from the Richmond Hill–Markham boundary to Main Street Markham), 11 (whole length), and 48 (from the Toronto/Markham boundary to 16th Avenue). Due to the Ontario government running low on transportation budget, many road improvement projects are either delayed or cancelled, and thus making road conditions worse. Downloading the highways to the York Region government allow road conditions to be better, and thus more inviting to visitors.

===== Downloading of Highway 7 =====
The downloading of Highway 7 has become a major issue in the Town of Markham, and York Region has not since suggested a renaming of the road and so it is still "Highway 7" although the road is more of an urban thoroughfare, with its frequent traffic light stops, numerous bus routes, automobiles, and traffic congestions.

The Markham government is now suggesting to rename Highway 7 as "Avenue 7" and claimed that would help the road to sound more "urban." Markham Council is presenting the idea to the York Region government, as well as the Richmond Hill and Vaughan Councils. Some objecting voices stated that would be too confusing or that the name "Avenue 7" would not make sense because the main route south of Highway 7 is called "14th Avenue." The main route north of Highway 7 is "16th Avenue" and thus Highway 7 should be named as "15th Avenue." However, as any proposed name is expected to be applied along the entire road across the region, that designation would be problematic since Highway 7 has shifted southward to the west in Vaughan to follow the same baseline as 14th Avenue.

=== York Regional Roads ===
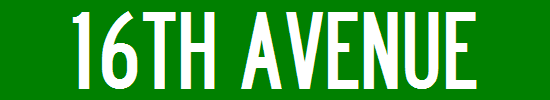
Street signs used on York Regional road intersections.

York Regional Road shield.

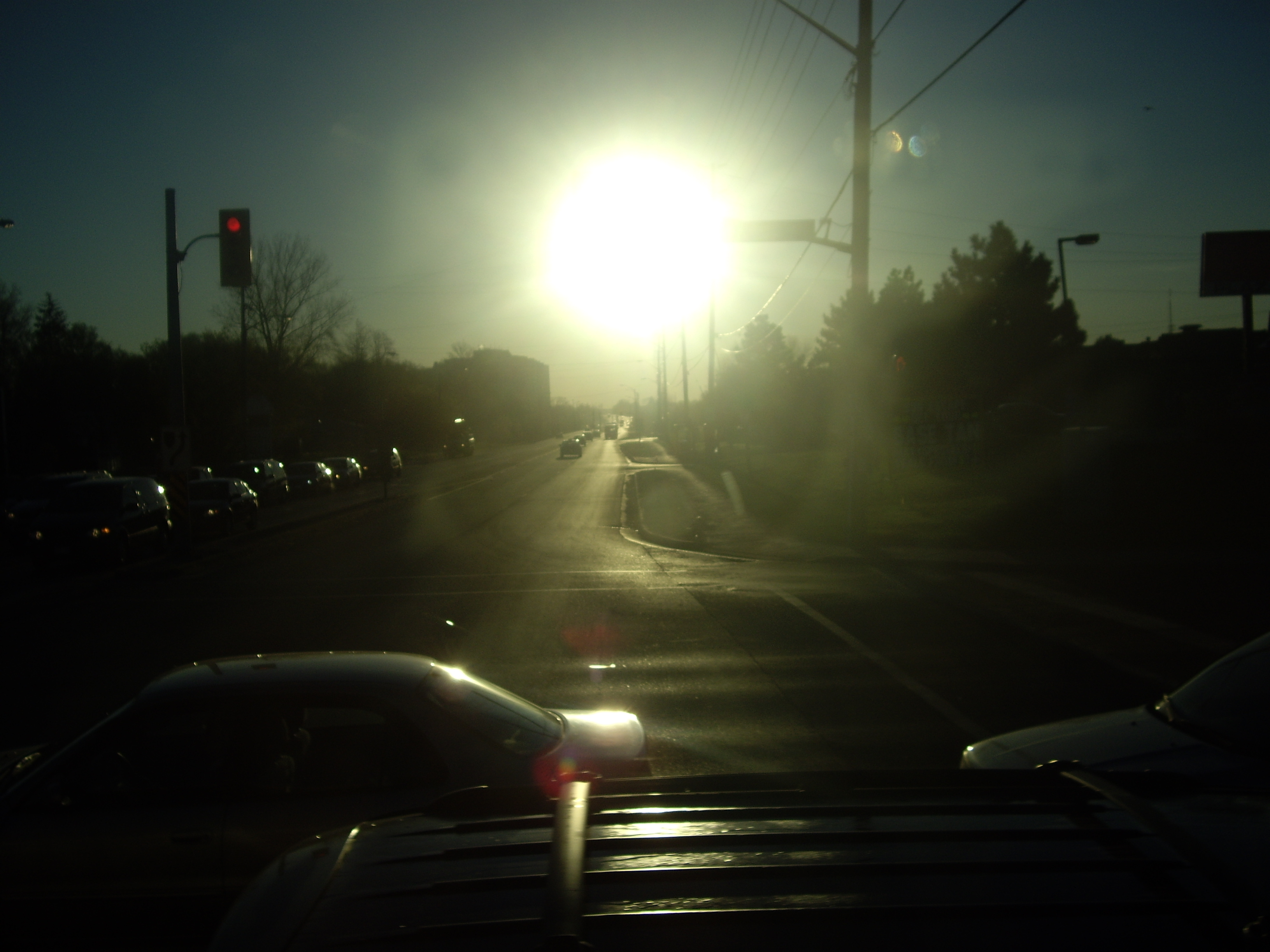
The corner of Kennedy Road and Regional Road 7.

Most main routes are urban "county" roads funded by York Region. Each of is assigned with a number that is shown by a shield shaping like a flowerpot. York Regional Roads, like the roads in Toronto, are laid out in a grid-like system. Most of the north–south routes inherit names from Toronto. For example, Warden Avenue in Toronto is still called Warden Avenue in Markham. Several of east-west York Regional Roads in Markham still retain their historical concession road numbers (as opposed with the concession roads in Toronto which have all been named), such as 14th Avenue and 16th Avenue (they are the 14th and 16th main routes from Front Street in Toronto). The York Regional Roads are laid out in a grid pattern about two kilometres apart. The regional road system is particularly successful since the landscape across Markham and York Region is relatively flat.

Most York Regional Roads within Markham are four lanes wide, with a few exceptions to the northern and eastern farmlands, where they are mostly two lanes.

York Regional Roads 1 (Yonge Street), 3 (Kennedy Road), 7 (Former Highway 7), 8 (Woodbine Avenue), 12 (Leslie Street), 25 (Major Mackenzie Drive), 30 (York Durham Line), 34 (Bayview Avenue), 48 (Donald Cousens Parkway), 49 (Elgin Mills Road), 65 (Warden Avenue), 67 (McCowan Road), 68 (Markham Road/Main Street Markham), 69 (Ninth Line), 71 (14th Avenue), and 73 (16th Avenue) pass through Markham.

=== Municipally-funded roads ===
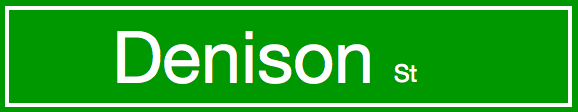
Road name signs used by the Markham government.

Road name signs used by Downtown Markham.

Markham also funds some of the main routes and all of the light-duty roads. Major roads that are funded by Markham are favourited by motorists for travelling within the city. Most motorists driving to other nearby municipalities must use York Regional Roads and so although they are called the "municipal main streets," they are relatively light duty, with one major exception being the combination of John Street, Esna Park Drive (North), and Alden Road, which link the two sections of York Regional Road 71. Those roads often serve as an alternative to car-jammed York Regional Roads. Markham also funds all side streets across the city.

=== Privately controlled ===
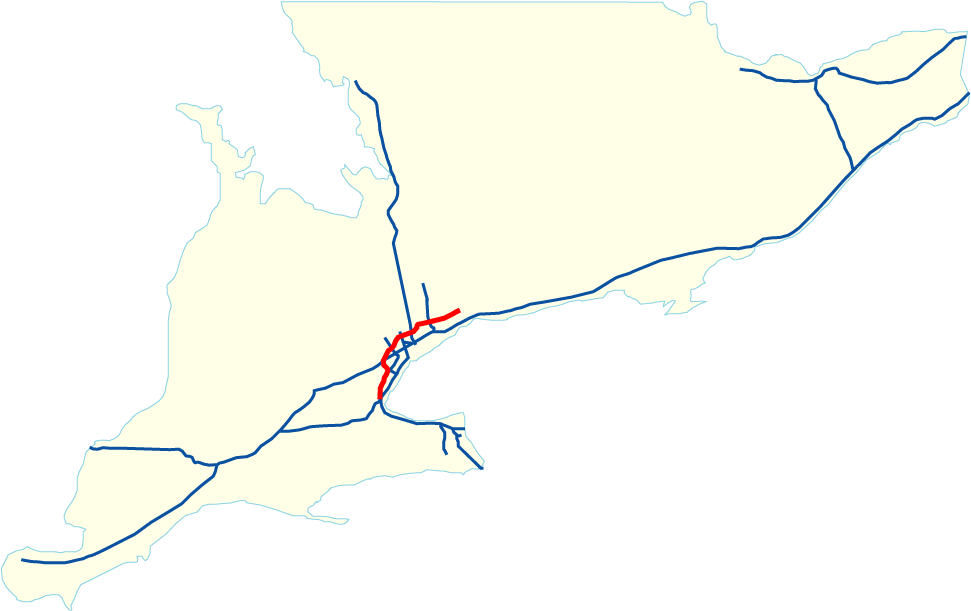
Highway 407's route across Southern Ontario, click to enlarge.

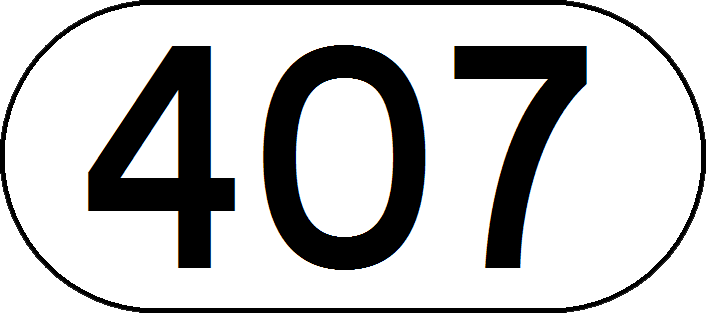
Highway 407's crest across the route.

In addition, Highway 407 Express Toll Route (407 ETR) is a majortoll east–west expressway and is privately controlled. The highway serves as an alternative to Highway 401, Highway 7, and Steeles Avenue, which are very busy roads. Users using Highway 407 must pay a toll.

Every time a customer uses the route, the cameras installed above every on ramp and offramp take a record of the transponder, which is leased by the Highway 407. The transponder holds information of the customer's automobile, and a bill will be mailed to the transponder holder's residence. If the customer has no transponder, the camera takes a photo of the vehicle's licence plate, and a video toll charge will apply. If the customer fails to pay, an interest is added to the owed amount. The fee is charged when the customer attempts to renew their driver's licence.

Highway 407 primarily serves Markham from Yonge Street to York-Durham Line. The highway connects Markham with Clarington to the east, and Burlington to the west.

=== Steeles Avenue ===
The entire length of Steeles Avenue (East) within Markham boundaries (Yonge Street to York-Durham Line) is under the jurisdiction of the City of Toronto government. Repairs and maintenance (such as snow removal) of the road are provided by Toronto Transportation, and signage is also provided by Toronto. Policing on both sides of Steeles Avenue is the responsibility of Toronto Police Service.

== See also ==
- Transportation in Mississauga
- Transportation in Toronto
- Transportation in Vaughan
