= Transportation in Toronto =

Road, rail and air networks in the Greater Toronto Area

Overview
- Locale: Greater Toronto Area
- Transit type: Passenger railway, subway, light rail, streetcar, bus, ridesharing, taxicab, ferry, bicycle, pedestrian

Transportation in the Canadian city of Toronto forms the hub of the road, rail and air networks in the Greater Toronto Area and much of southern Ontario. There are many forms of transport in the city, including railways, highways, and public transit. Toronto also has an extensive network of bicycle lanes and multi-use trails and paths.

== Railways ==
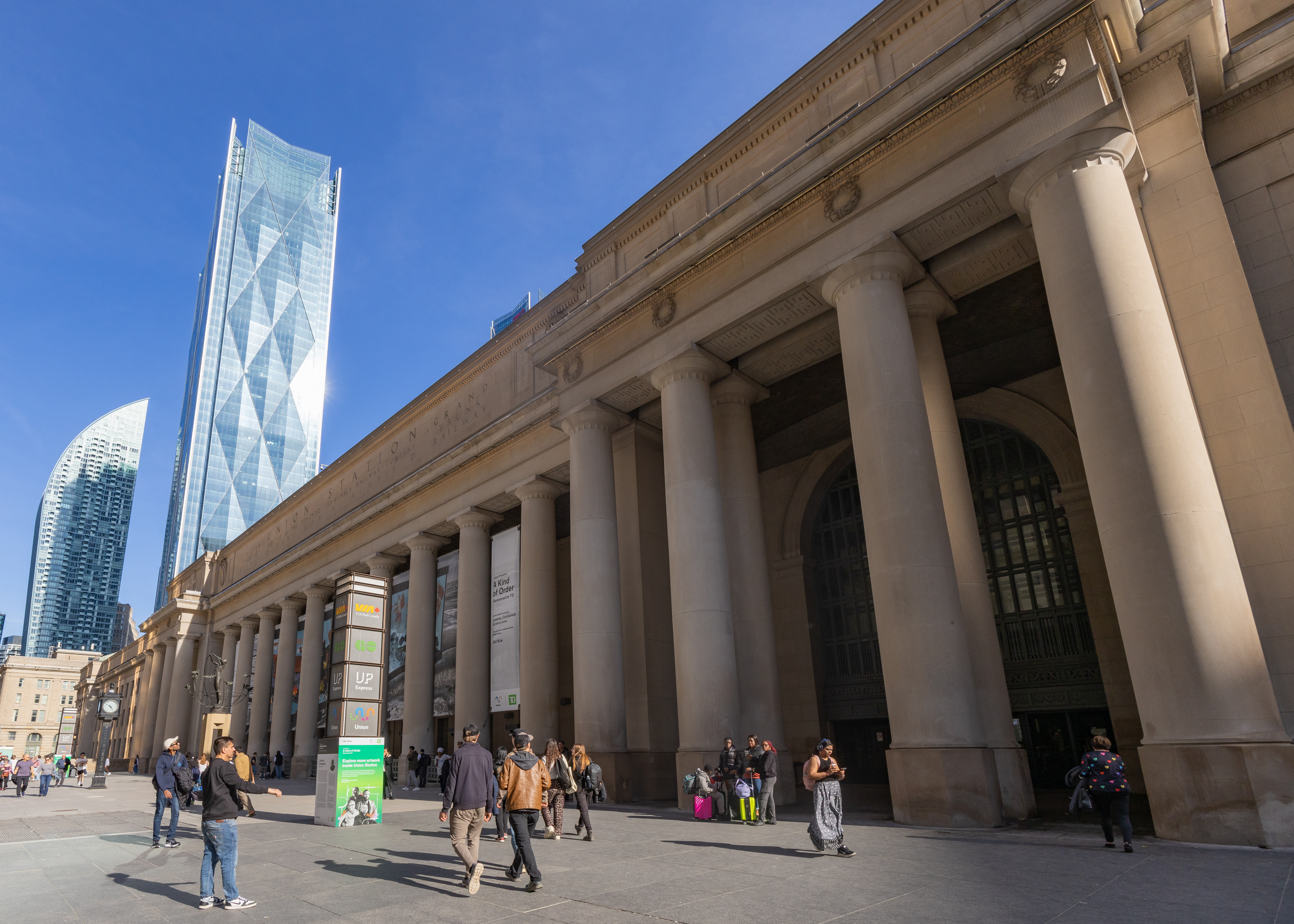
Union Station is the Intermodal passenger transportation hub of Toronto. It provides access to the region's commuter rail, GO Transit, and inter-city rail services Amtrak, and Via Rail.

Toronto is a major rail transportation hub in Canada and central North America, with most commercial rail freight operations carried out by two Class I railways, Canadian National Railway and Canadian Pacific Railway. Both companies operate major yards and intermodal facilities in various parts of Toronto to serve manufacturing and logistics customers. Although at one time both railways saw most of their operations based out of the waterfront area, over time they have shifted to facilities in suburban Toronto or adjacent municipalities. Most waterfront trackage has been scaled back and abandoned in favour of real-estate development, with the remaining main lines in this area being almost the exclusive domain of passenger carriers. Significant portions of the railway network in the City of Toronto have been sold by the commercial railways to GO Transit, the provincial commuter rail operator.

Toronto is served by inter-city Via Rail to other Canadian cities and Amtrak's daily New York City trains through Union Station, a grand neoclassical structure in the heart of the city's downtown, which is shared with GO Transit's commuter trains.

The Union Pearson Express, an airport rail link from Toronto Pearson International Airport to Union Station and the central business district, started operation on June 6, 2015. It was completed in time for the 2015 Pan American Games.

== Bus terminals ==
GO Transit operates all of its commuter bus services into and out of downtown Toronto from the Union Station Bus Terminal, a terminal owned and operated by GO Transit and adjacent to Union Station. This bus terminal was opened in 2020, replacing an earlier Union Station GO Bus Terminal. GO Transit also operates the Yorkdale Bus Terminal at Yorkdale Shopping Centre and several terminals at subway stations, including Finch Bus Terminal, Scarborough Centre Bus Terminal and York Mills Bus Terminal.

Most intercity coach services operate out of the new Union Station Bus Terminal after relocating from the decommissioned Toronto Coach Terminal at Bay and Dundas in 2021. Intercity coach companies operating services out of the Union Station Bus Terminal include Ontario Northland, Megabus, Rider Express, Flixbus, and Greyhound Lines.

== Roads and highways ==
=== Highways ===
There are a number of freeways that serve both the city proper and the Greater Toronto Area. Bisecting the city from west to east across its inner suburbs, Highway 401 (or simply, "the 401") acts as a bypass of the downtown core, and is both the busiest and widest highway in Canada. At its interchange with Highway 400, where it spans 18 lanes, it sees over 400,000 vehicles on an average day, making it one of the world's busiest highways.

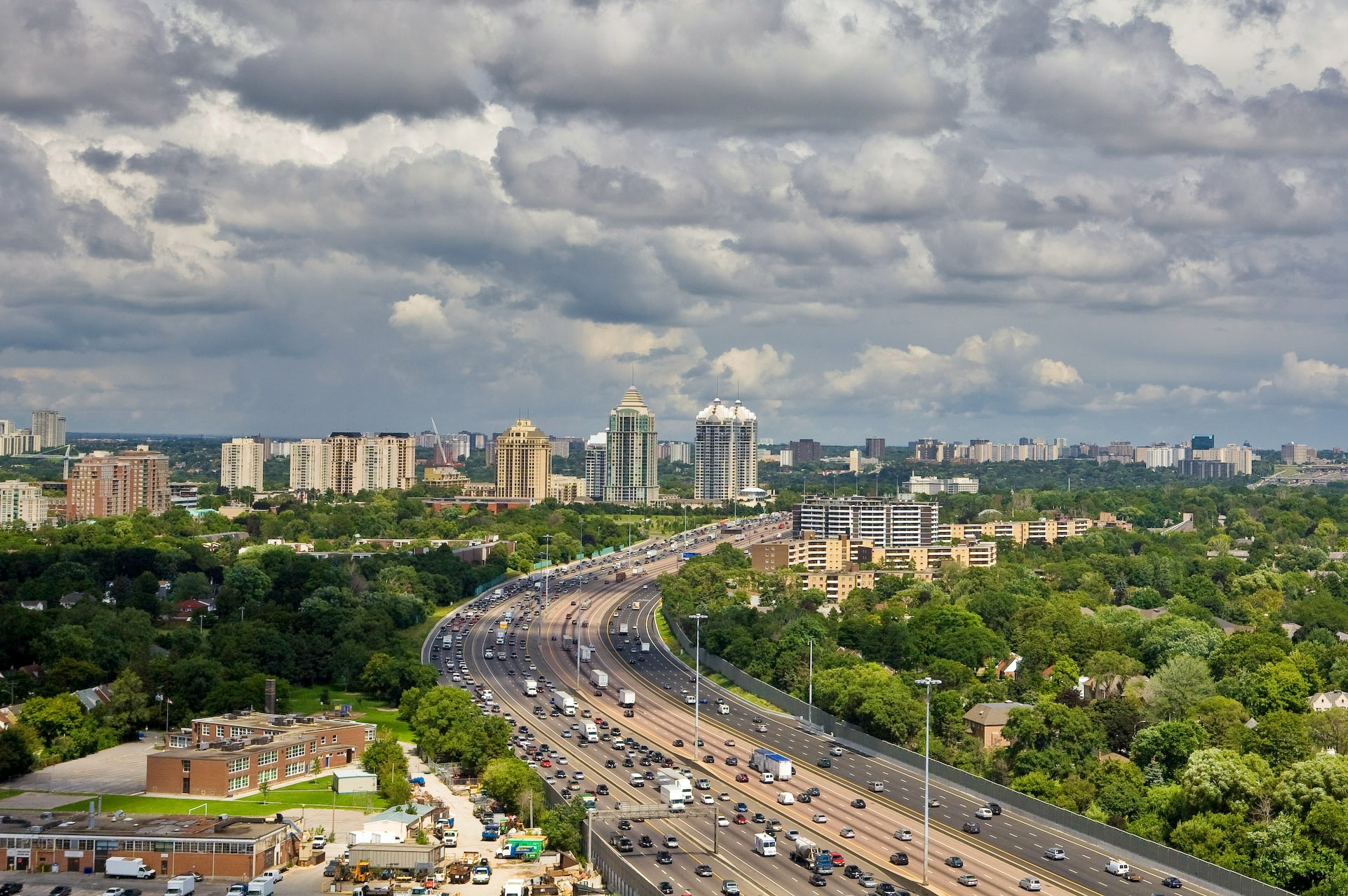
Highway 401 is a 400-series highway that passes west to east through Greater Toronto. The volume of vehicles that use the GTA's portion of Highway 401 makes it the busiest highway in North America.

At the western edge of the city, the 401 meets Highway 427, an important north–south artery between Toronto Pearson International Airport and the Gardiner Expressway. It mainly serves the airport and the western suburbs outside the city of Toronto. In the same area, the short length of Highway 409 connects the airport directly to the traffic flow of the 401. Moving east, the 401 then intersects Highway 400, which leads north to Barrie, the recreational areas of Ontario's "Cottage Country" and beyond, to the northern reaches of the province. East of the 400, the 401 meets Allen Road, the Don Valley Parkway / Highway 404, and finally Highway 2A before continuing eastwards out of Toronto into the suburbs of Pickering, Ajax, Whitby, and Oshawa.

Allen Road is an expressway from Eglinton Avenue to Sheppard Avenue north of the 401. The Don Valley Parkway is a north–south expressway that links downtown Toronto to the 401. Beyond the 401, this route is known as Highway 404, and connects the more distant outer suburbs of Markham, Richmond Hill, Aurora, and Newmarket to the 401.

The Gardiner Expressway (or colloquially, "the Gardiner") roughly follows the northern shore of Lake Ontario, and connects the western suburbs to the downtown core. West of Highway 427, the Gardiner becomes Queen Elizabeth Way (often called the QEW, or simply "The Q.E."), which heads towards Hamilton, Niagara Falls, and Fort Erie (and the Canada–United States border in the vicinity of Buffalo).

Allen Road, the Don Valley Parkway, the Gardiner Expressway, and Highway 2A are municipal expressways, meaning they are maintained by the city through the Toronto Transportation Services rather than the provincial government through the Ministry of Transportation. The other highways serving the city (the 400-series highways) are maintained by the provincial Ministry of Transportation.

Highway 407 ETR is not located within Toronto proper, but is a major highway in the Greater Toronto Area that acts as a secondary bypass around the northern end of the city, stretching from Burlington in the west to Pickering in the east. It is an electronic toll road with no physical toll booths, instead depending on automatic recognition of vehicle plates or electronic toll collection.

=== Roads ===
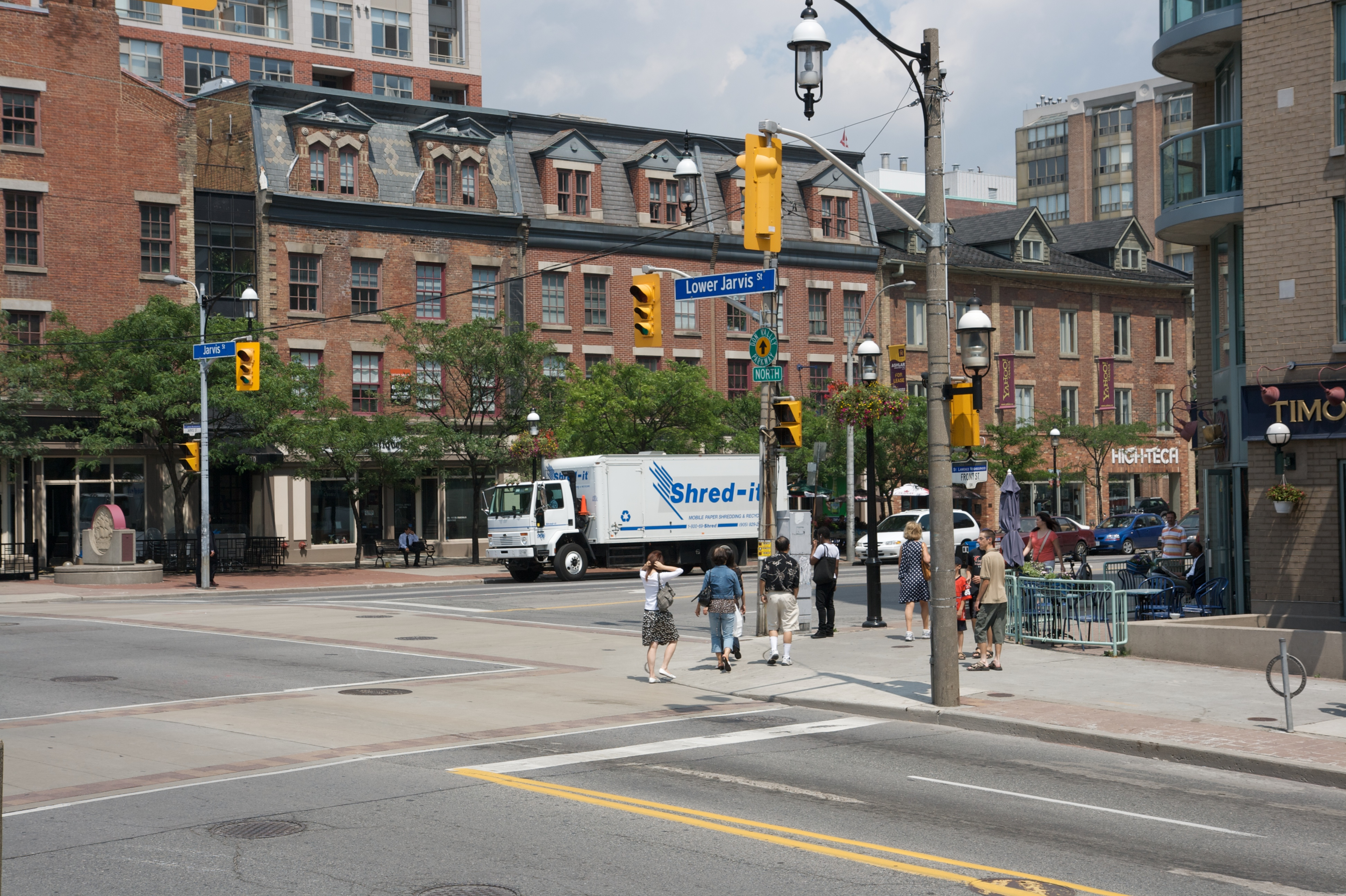
The intersection of Front Street and Jarvis Street in the neighbourhood of St. Lawrence. Front Street was one of the original streets of the Town of York.

Toronto has approximately 10,000 roads spanning a total of 5,397 kilometres (3,354 mi) across the city. Roads in the city are maintained by Toronto Transportation Services. The street network downtown mostly consists of a dense network of four-lane arterial and collector roads typical of an older North American city. Outside the downtown core, most arterial roads have two or three lanes of traffic in each direction.

Toronto's roads are largely built along a grid-based road system. The grid of major city roads was laid out by a concession road system, in which major arterial roads are 100 chains (2.0 km; 6,600 ft) apart (with some exceptions, particularly in Scarborough and Etobicoke, as they used a different survey). Major east–west arterial roads are generally parallel with the Lake Ontario shoreline, using Queen Street as a baseline, and major north–south arterial roads are roughly perpendicular to these streets, though slightly angled north of Eglinton Avenue. Toronto's grid north is approximately 17° to the west of true north. Many arterials – particularly north–south ones, due to the city originally being within the former York County – continue beyond the city into the 905 suburbs and further into the rural countryside.

Toronto's road grid is sometimes broken by geographical features, most notably the Don River ravines. For example, Lawrence Avenue and St. Clair Avenue are both split into two sections by the Don Valley, and, in the case of St. Clair Avenue, the distance between the two sections is 4.6 kilometres (2.9 mi). Roads sometimes change names, and the 1998 amalgamation caused some doubling in road names, although this is usually confined to smaller, more residential roads. The grid system is also occasionally broken by historical roads. These include streets such as Davenport Road and Vaughan Road, which follow an old native trail, while others, such as Kingston Road, were originally constructed to link Toronto with other settlements in Ontario.

Roads in Toronto are often potted with potholes due to freezing and thawing in the winter and spring seasons. On average, there are 100 major potholes reported with a high of 1000. Potholes are repaired by city crews. Full paving is done by contractors when the need arises.

=== Toll roads ===
No Toronto roads have been tolled since 1896; the closest is Highway 407 in Durham Region, York Region and Peel Region; the expressway runs northeast, north and northwest of the city, respectively.

From 1820 to 1896, tolls were collected on roads leaving the old city boundaries:

- Yonge and King
- Yonge and College/Carlton
- Yonge Street and Bloor Street
- Yonge Street at Gallows Hill
- Queen Street West and Ossington Avenue

== Public transportation ==
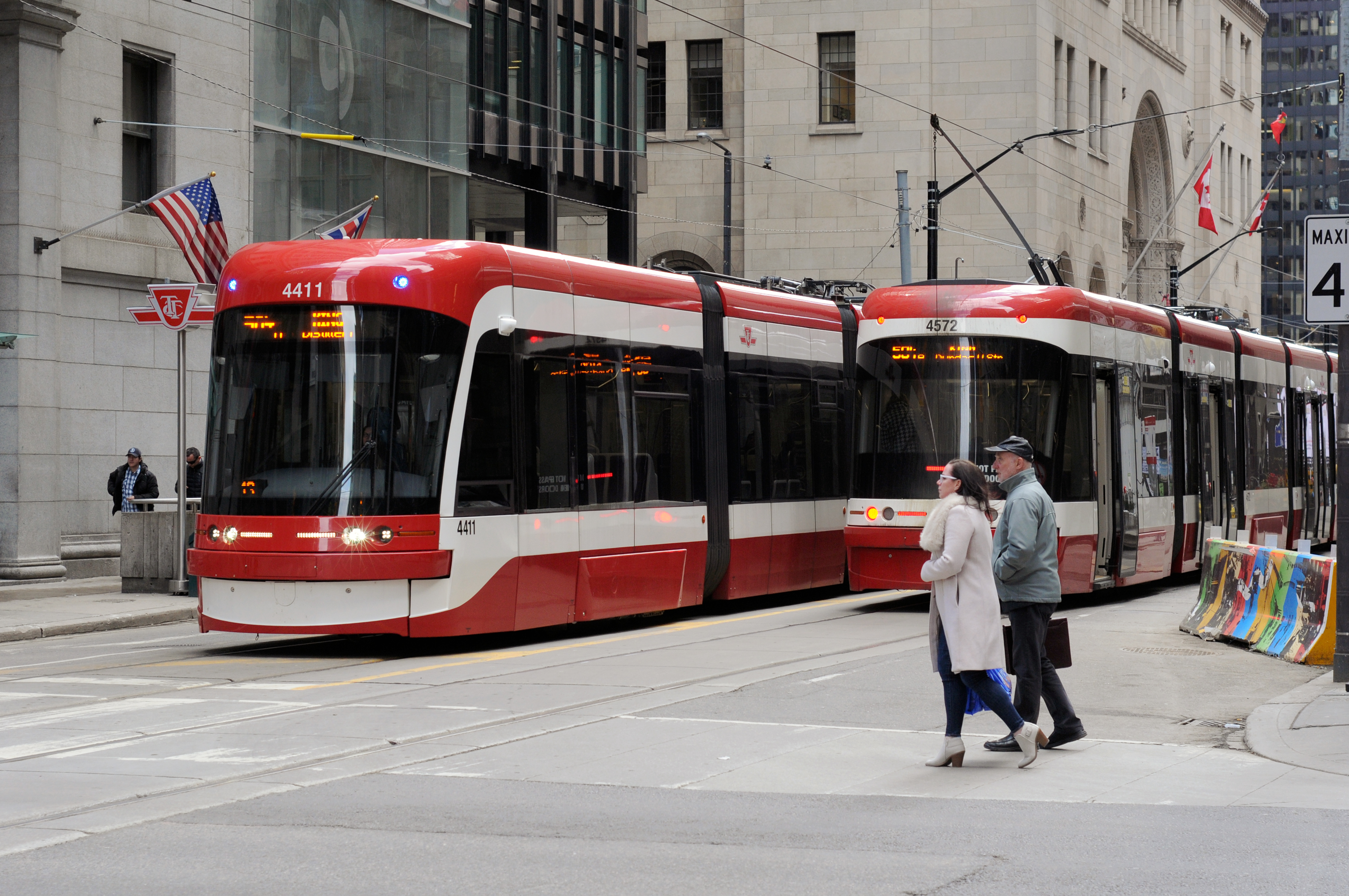
The Toronto streetcar system is the largest and busiest light-rail system in North America.

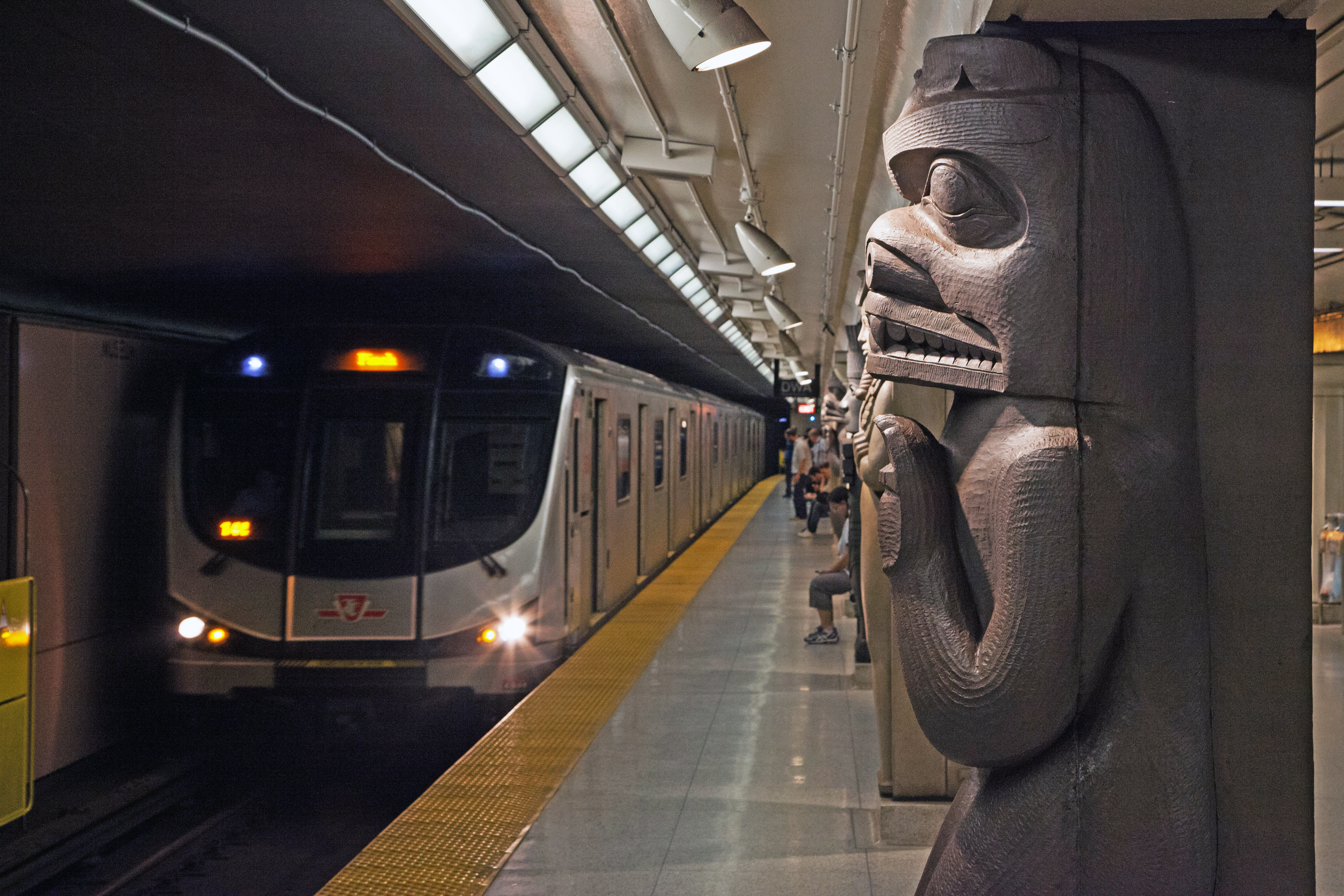
Subway platform for Museum station on the TTC's Line 1.

Within the city, the Toronto Transit Commission (TTC) operates an extensive system of subways, buses, and streetcars, covering 1,200 km (750 mi) of routes. A single flat fare applies for any trip within the city regardless of distance or transfers required with the exception of contracted routes that travel outside of the city and downtown express routes. The TTC is the third busiest transit agency by ridership in North America (after the Mexico City Metro and New York City's New York City Transit Authority).

=== Buses and streetcars ===
The rest of the city is primarily served by a network of about 150 bus routes, many of them forming a grid along main streets. Most bus routes connect to one or more subway stations, save a few routes that serve bus depots or GO stations. A more distinctive feature of the TTC is the streetcar system, one of the few remaining in North America with a substantial amount of in-street operation. The city of Toronto has the largest streetcar system in the Americas.

=== Rapid transit ===
The backbone of the TTC is the Toronto subway system with 5 lines: Line 1 Yonge–University, Line 2 Bloor–Danforth, Line 4 Sheppard, Line 5 Eglinton, and Line 6 Finch West. Lines 5 and 6 use light rail technology and are owned by Metrolinx, while the others are considered heavy rail and are owned by the TTC. Line 3 Scarborough closed in July 2023.

=== Commuter rail ===
Inter-regional commuter rail and bus service is provided by GO Transit. GO trains and buses connect the city to the rest of the Greater Toronto Area. Ontario Northland Motor Coach Services operates buses to destinations in northern Ontario.

== Airports ==
=== Toronto Pearson International Airport ===
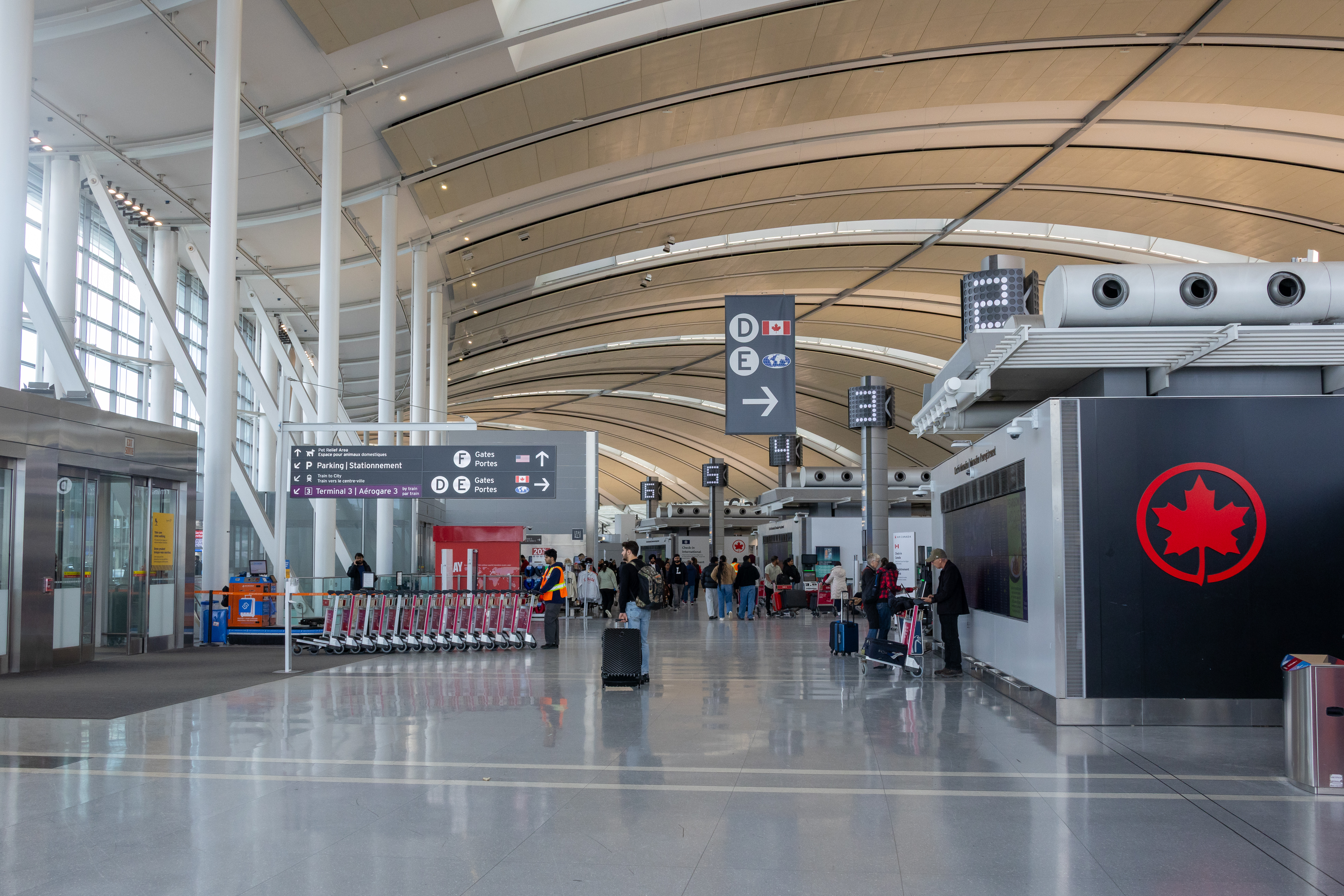
Terminal 1 is Toronto Pearson International Airport's largest Airport terminal. Made up of Terminals 1 and 3, Pearson International is the largest, and busiest airport in Canada.

Toronto's primary airport is Toronto Pearson International Airport (YYZ), straddling Toronto's western boundary with Mississauga. Pearson's air traffic is over 41 million passengers in 2015, and it is the world's largest originator of air traffic into the United States. It is the busiest airport in Canada and is the largest hub for Air Canada. It is the world's 15th busiest airport by flights as of 2014.

=== Billy Bishop Toronto City Airport (Island Airport) ===
The city also has a small commercial airport, the Billy Bishop Toronto City Airport (YTZ), commonly known as the "island airport" on Toronto Island, southwest of downtown. The airport is used for civil aviation, medevac flights, and regional airlines using STOL-type turboprop aircraft. Since 1984, regional carriers have included City Express, Jazz Air and since 2006, Porter Airlines. Airport access is via a short ferry ride or tunnel. 508,574 passengers used the airport in 2008, making it the busiest one-airline served airport in the world. In 2009 it surpassed Thunder Bay International Airport to become the 3rd busiest air facility in Ontario (after Toronto-Pearson and Ottawa International) serving 770,000 passengers, and growing to handle 2.3 million passengers in 2014.

=== Nearby airports ===
The Hamilton International Airport is an alternate, relief airport to Pearson. Situated in Hamilton, 85 km (53 mi) southwest of Toronto, it is also a terminus for low-cost carrier, charter airline, and cargo traffic.

Travellers from Toronto to the United States alternatively travel from Buffalo Niagara International Airport, located outside of Buffalo, New York, United States. The lower airfares offered for U.S. destinations make travelling from Buffalo a cost-effective alternative, despite the time needed to make the 170-kilometre (110 mi) trip by motor vehicle from Toronto.

There are a number of other general aviation airports in and around the city, including Markham Airport, Oshawa Airport, Brampton Airport, and Burlington Air Park (also known as Burlington Executive Aerodrome), although none see scheduled commercial passenger service. The city is also host to a number of heliports, primarily used for medevac flights to local hospitals. St. Michael's Hospital, the Hospital for Sick Children, and Sunnybrook Health Sciences Centre all have heliports listed in the Canada Flight Supplement. Within city limits there are also two helipads for private use. The Toronto/Wilson's Heliport owned by Wilson's Heli-Transport is located in Etobicoke. Polson Pier is home to the Chartright Polson Pier heliport (identifier CPP4), which sees occasional helicopter charter traffic. Adjacent to the Billy Bishop Toronto City Airport is a floatplane base of the same name (identifier CPZ9), owned by the Toronto Port Authority and operated by Stolport FBO. Aircraft using the water aerodrome land in the Toronto Harbour and use the floatplane ramp on the eastern portion of the main airport. The water aerodrome is open seasonally, from April 15 to November 15 of each year.

== Cycling ==
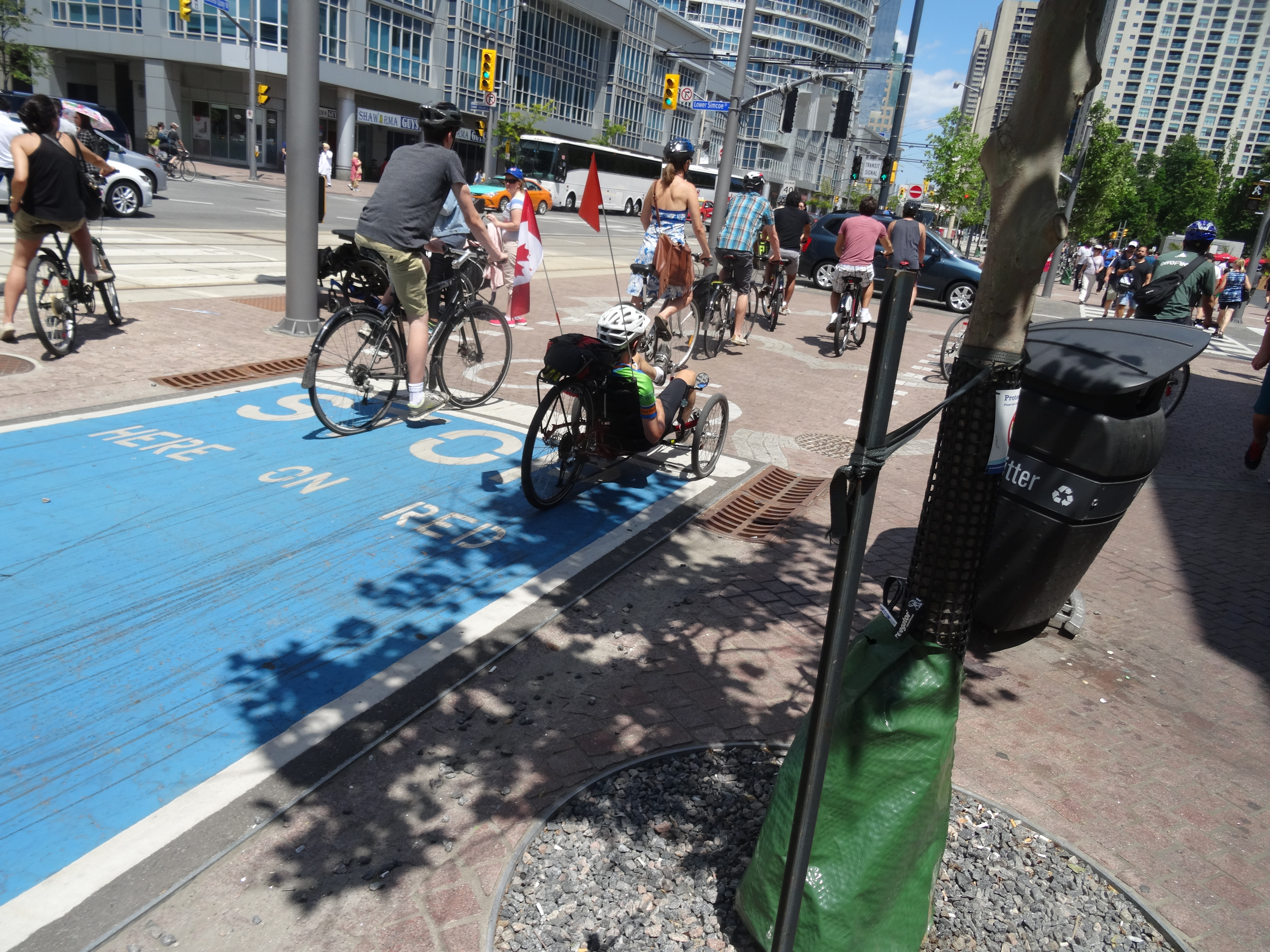
Bike lanes on Queens Quay. Bike lanes were introduced in order to improve the safety of cyclists.

Cycling in Toronto has improved over the years as the residents and municipal government have become more interested in it as a form of transportation. Toronto has a major program in place to dramatically expand the network through on-road separate bike lanes, with the goal of having any cyclist in the city proper within a five-minute ride of a designated bike route. The network includes a planned 500 km of on-street bike lanes, and another 250 km of off-road paved trails. To date, only a small portion of the network has been built. Gaining approval to put in the on-street bike lanes has proven to be a serious problem, and less than 90 km of the planned 500 km have been set up so far. The small coverage also reduces the overall usefulness of the network, as many of the lanes do not connect with each other (see Metcalfe's Law). In 2011, the Public Bike System Company launched a bicycle sharing system known as BIXI. The system was renamed Bike Share Toronto after it was taken over by the Toronto Parking Authority.

Two major off-road paved trails along the Don and Humber river valleys provide a backbone for transport on the east and west side of the downtown area. However, both trails are non-continuous and quite narrow in areas, making them unsuitable as major transport routes. The two trails are ostensibly connected together via a lakeside route, but due to a massive build-out of this area during the 1990s, the "trail" through much of the downtown area exists in name only.

Nevertheless, Toronto has an extensive bicycle culture. The municipal government encourages bicycle use through its Toronto Bike Plan. An extensive City of Toronto Bicycle Map is available from the City of Toronto free of charge as well as from their website. All TTC buses have bicycle racks attached to their fronts since 2013. Bicycles are allowed on the subway outside of the morning and evening rush hours. Since the late 2000s, the Toronto-Niagara Bike Train Initiative has helped connect Toronto cyclists with Niagara Region bike trails via Via Rail.

== Walking ==
A 2013 study by Walk Score ranked Toronto the 2nd most walkable city in Canada. In addition to surface-level paths and sidewalks, a network of underground pedestrian tunnels are used to connect the various buildings in Downtown Toronto. Known as PATH, it was intended to alleviate pedestrian traffic of downtown's sidewalks. Underground pedestrian tunnels were used in Toronto since 1900, although the construction of the larger PATH network did not commence until the 1960s. Spanning more than 30 kilometres (19 mi), with 371,600 square metres (4,000,000 sq ft) of retail space, the PATH network is recognized as the world's largest underground shopping complex by the Guinness Book of World Records.

== Ferries ==
The principal ferry service to the Toronto Islands is provided by the city's Parks, Forestry and Recreation division. Ferries run year-round from the Toronto Ferry Docks at the foot of Bay Street to Hanlan's Point, Centre Island, and Ward's Island.

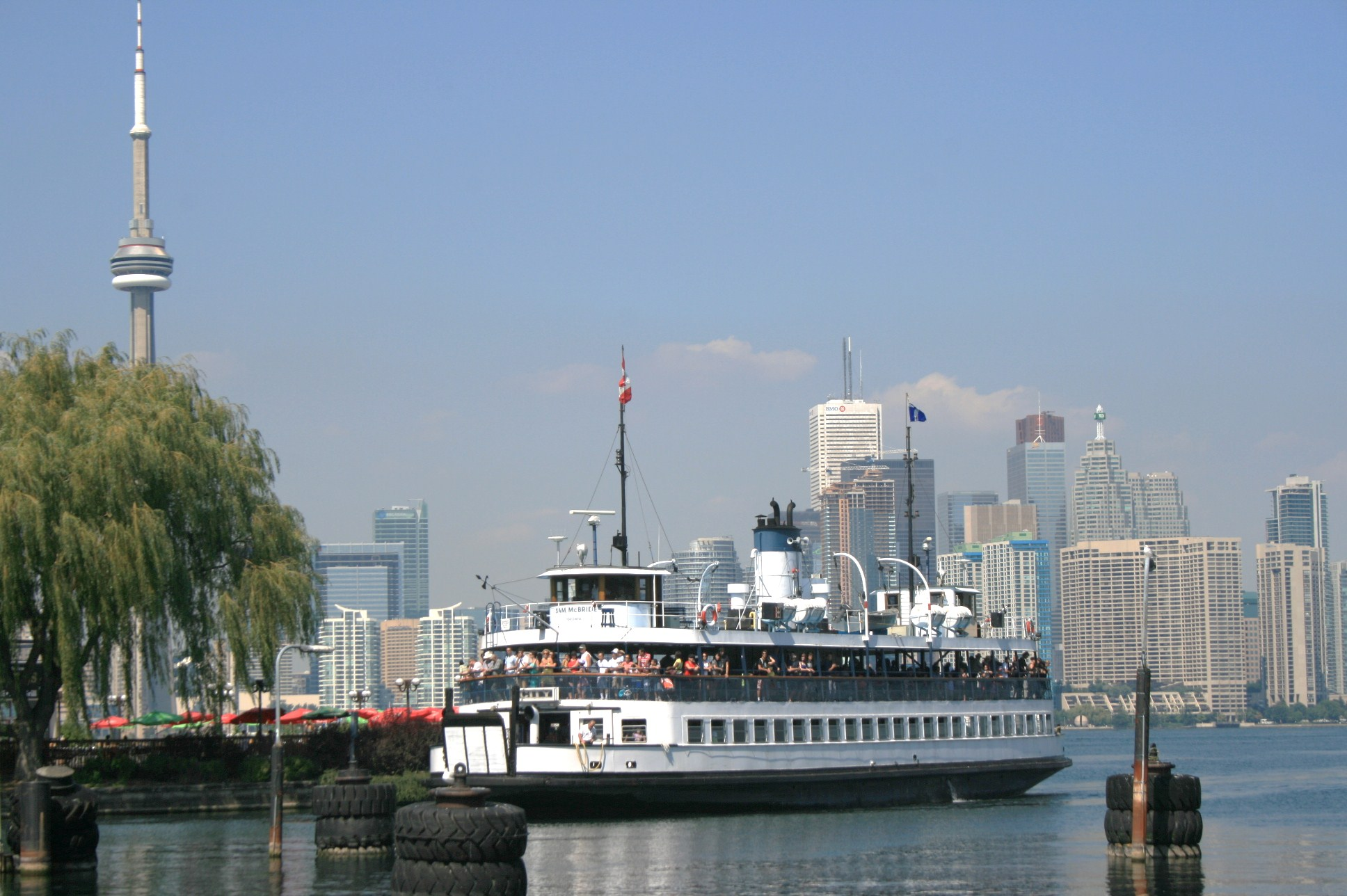
The City of Toronto operates four ferries to the Toronto Islands.

A high-speed passenger/vehicle ferry service across Lake Ontario to Rochester, New York was launched on June 17, 2004, using the vessel Spirit of Ontario I under the marketing term "The Breeze". After experiencing a financing-caused service interruption, it returned to service June 30, 2005, under the ownership of the City of Rochester and operated by Bay Ferries Great Lakes Limited, using the marketing term "The Cat". After an unprofitable summer of operation mostly due to delays, and despite adequate ridership, the newly elected Mayor of Rochester announced on January 10, 2006, that the service would be discontinued and the city would sell the ship, which was purchased by UK-based Euroferries Ltd, for service across the English Channel. It was finally sold in April 2007 to the German company Förde Reederei Seetouristik (FRS) for a ferry service between Spain and Morocco across the Strait of Gibraltar, and the Spirit of Ontario I was renamed HSC Tanger Jet II and later as HSC Dolphin Jet, crossing the Kattegat between Aarhus and Kalundborg in Denmark.

The International Marine Passenger Terminal at 8 Unwin Avenue in the Port Lands, built to accommodate multiple visits per day by The Breeze, is currently only used a couple of times a year to accommodate visiting cruise ships.

The Toronto Ferry Company's private ferry operation was taken over by the Toronto Transit Commission in 1927. The Royal Canadian Yacht Club has operated its two private ferries, the Hiawatha and Kwasind, for over a century.

The city also operates a ferry service to take passengers to and from the Billy Bishop Island Airport with its terminal at the foot of Bathurst Street.

== Future prospects and concerns ==
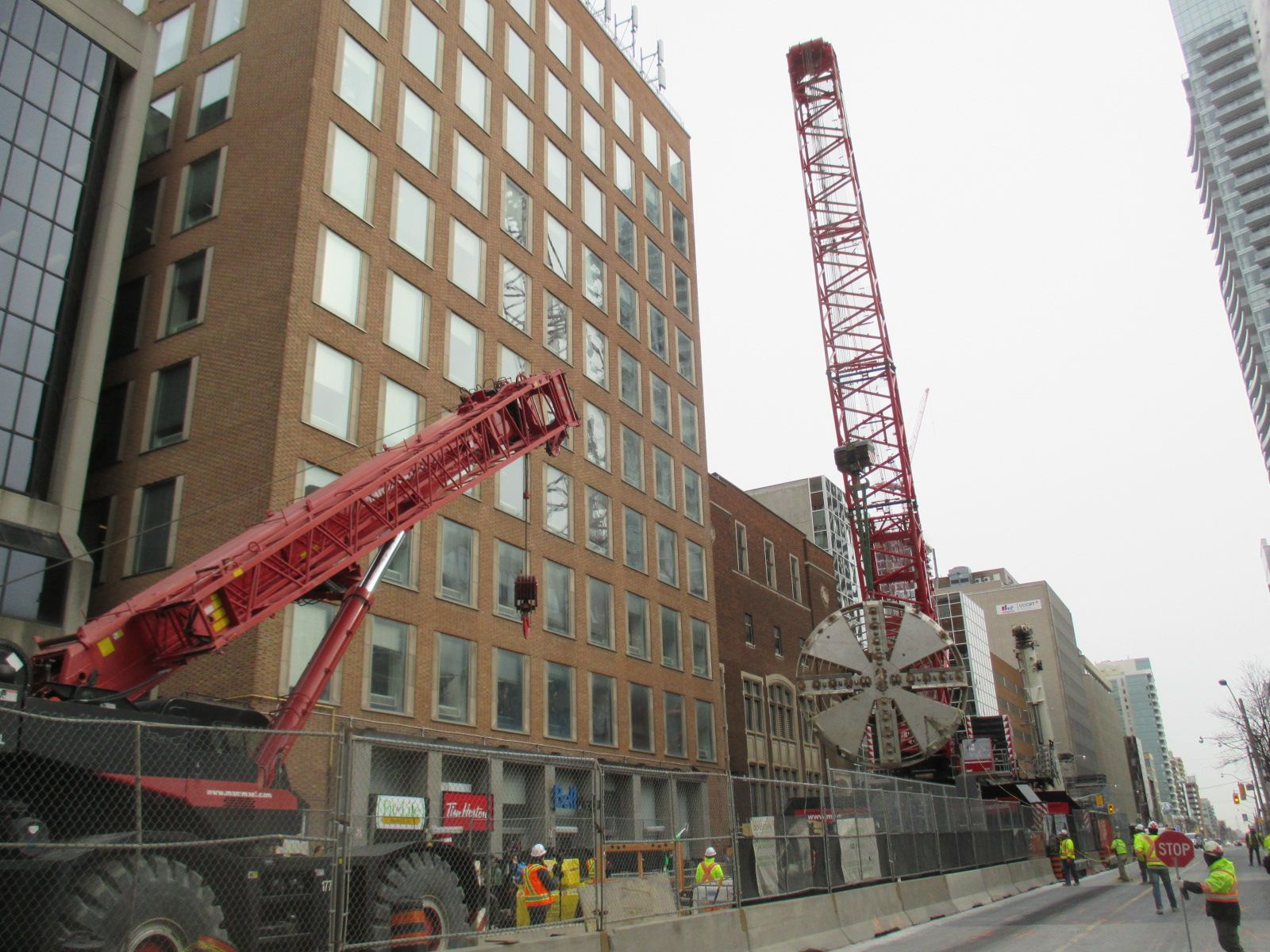
Extraction of the tunnel boring machine used to build Line 5 Eglinton. Part of the Toronto subway system, it opened in 2026.

The regional population of Toronto is expected to reach 7 million people within the next 10 years, up from the current 5.5 million, making it one of the fastest growing metropolitan areas in North America. Over the last couple of decades, traffic volumes has been increasing steadily in the Greater Toronto Area. However, road and transit investments have not kept pace with the growth in demand. Urban sprawl is a major factor: some commuters travel significant distances within the city and the surrounding GTA for employment. Downtown-to-suburb and suburb-suburb commutes have been increasing as well, which existing public transit services are not organized to efficiently accommodate. This contributes to congestion, adding to travel times and causing smog. Congestion in the GTA is estimated to cost the economy between 6 and 11 billion dollars each year. One study found that the average commute time in GTA exceeds that of 19 larger or comparably sized cities. Other studies comparing international cities show that Toronto residents on average spend the most time commuting to work in North America and sixth-most overall in the world.

In March 2004, the Ontario government announced the creation of the "Greater Toronto Transit Authority" (GTTA - not to be confused with GTAA, acronym for the Greater Toronto Airport Authority), renamed Metrolinx in December 2007, with the goal of facilitating improved integration between the city and suburban transport systems. One key element to this integration would be a single fare system, called Presto, to improve the convenience of transfers between different transit agencies. On March 23, 2006, the Government of Ontario announced funding for the extension northward of the TTC's Spadina Subway Line to the York University campus and beyond into the proposed Vaughan Metropolitan Centre in neighbouring Vaughan, York Region. When completed, it will be the first extension of the TTC subway system beyond the current post-1998 municipal border of Toronto. However, Toronto's existing transportation network, particularly public transit, have not kept up with the growth of the city. In the past decade, issues concerning transit funding and expansion have become political football. For example, in 2007, Metrolinx is provided $8.4 billion of funding to construct four light rail lines throughout the city, including light rail lines along Eglinton Avenue, Finch Avenue West, and Sheppard Avenue East, as well as a line replacing Line 3 Scarborough, all of which are expected to be completed and in operation by 2020. However, by 2017, political interference from provincial and municipal levels of government, funding cuts and delays meant that no lines will be complete by 2020, with no official opening date set for the initial phase of the Line 5 Eglinton. Funding for the daily operations of the TTC have become chronically low with the removal of provincial funding by the premier Mike Harris in the late 90s, leaving the City of Toronto as the sole source of operational subsidies.

=== Chief congestion officer ===
In the February 2025 Breaking Gridlock Action Plan, the Toronto Region Board of Trade called for a new city office to work with multiple departments to reduce congestion. In December 2025, Olivia Chow appointed Andrew Posluns as the city's first chief congestion officer of the Strategic Capital Coordination Office. Posluns reports to the deputy city manager for Infrastructure Services. The Toronto Sun suggested he may become the scapegoat for the city's traffic issues.

In the 2026 City of Toronto Congestion Management Plan, Posluns stated the plan would drive down travel times, find ways to improve congestion hot spots, and explore digital twins.

== See also ==
- Transportation in Markham, Ontario
- Transportation in Mississauga
- Transportation in Vaughan
