= Transportation in Vaughan =

The City of Vaughan in Ontario, Canada offers a complex transportation infrastructure, which includes highways, public transit, regional roads, municipality-funded roads, and train services.

== Air ==
Because of Vaughan's proximity to Toronto, Vaughan residents use Toronto Pearson International Airport in order to travel to various domestic and international destinations.

Alternatives to the Toronto Pearson International Airport are available in the nearby cities of Hamilton and Kitchener-Waterloo, where the Hamilton and Waterloo Airports are located.

Vaughan was once home to the now-closed Maple Airport. The only aerodromes that remain in the city are small private facilities. Two are unregistered helipads, one located at the Hwy 7 & 400 Walmart and another at the Eagle's Nest golf club in Maple. The third is the Kleinburg/Tavares Field (Identifier CTV4), a small grass strip with a 1000' runway and a helipad, located near Teston Road & Pine Valley Drive in Kleinburg

== Public transportation ==
Within the city, York Region Transit (YRT), which includes Viva (bus rapid transit); and the Toronto Transit Commission (TTC), provide public transit services. Prior to 2001, Vaughan was served by a municipal-funded transit system, namely Vaughan Transit. In 2001, the York Region government amalgamated the Vaughan Transit with four other municipal-managed transit systems in York Region to form YRT. In 2005, York Region Transit launched Viva, which operated in parts of Vaughan on Highway 7. In addition, GO Transit provides commuter trains and buses.

=== York Region Transit ===
YRT serves Vaughan with over 20 routes. Most of its bus routes operate on main roads throughout Vaughan, which is laid out in a grid-like system. Fares are $4.00 regardless of age. The Toronto Transit Commission (TTC) operates one contracted route along Bathurst Street, and a second (TTC or YRT) fare is charged when crossing the city limits at Steeles Avenue in the relevant direction. However, a TTC fare is not charged on YRT buses entering Toronto to make connections at terminals. York Region Transit allows Vaughan residents to travel around York Region, and to the surrounding Greater Toronto and Hamilton Area with GO Transit Connections.

It has five major terminals in Vaughan: Promenade Terminal located at the Promenade Mall, Vaughan Mills Terminal located at Vaughan Mills Mall, and at three TTC subway stations: SmartCentres Place Bus Terminal at Vaughan Metropolitan Centre, Highway 407, and Pioneer Village.

Connections to other transit systems include Brampton Transit, GO Transit, and the aforementioned TTC.

==== Viva ====
Due to the increased congestion on York Region's roads, York Region Transit launched a bus rapid transit (BRT) system on September 4, 2005, and named it Viva, meaning "praised by everyone" in Italian. Unlike regular YRT routes, Viva stops only at Vivastations, specially designed stops that incorporate a ticket vending machine and a ticket validator (fares are on a proof-of-payment basis to speed up boarding times), as well as a real-time "smart" display that notify passengers when the next vehicle is expected to depart. Most Vivastations are blue, but several stops on Yonge Street have a unique bronze design referred to as "vivavintage" to better suit the historic areas, especially along Yonge Street in Thornhill, where space is short and will be served by miniature "vivamicro" stations. YRT fares apply to VIVA.

It is the name for the York Region Rapid Transit Plan and was funded through a Public-Private Partnership (P3) consortium called the York Region Rapid Transit Corporation. York Region has control over all fares and service planning. Viva service is integrated with YRT's regular transit routes and operated as one regional transit system (1system) that enables customers to travel across the city and region.

The system was opened to public in four stages. The second phase was opened on October 16, 2005, the third phase was opened on November 20, and the first part of the fourth phase was opened on January 2, 2006.

There are four viva lines operating within Vaughan (80% of Viva lines operating within York Region): Viva Blue (on Yonge Street), Viva Orange (on Highway 7), and Viva Pink (an alternative to Viva Blue at peak-hours).

Viva bus lines operate using blue Van Hool and Novabus vehicles. Viva Orange buses use the Highway 7 Rapidway, which are reserved bus lanes in the centre of Highway 7, for part of the route. Viva buses are given priority at traffic signals, meaning that the bus driver can adjust the traffic lights when the bus are behind schedule due to a traffic congestion, significantly improving the efficiency of service. Buses operate 18 hours a day, 7 days per week, including holidays. Bus frequency ranges from 5 minutes to 15 minutes.

=== Toronto Transit Commission ===
In addition to YRT, the Toronto Transit Commission (TTC) also provides some services within the city:

==== Subway ====
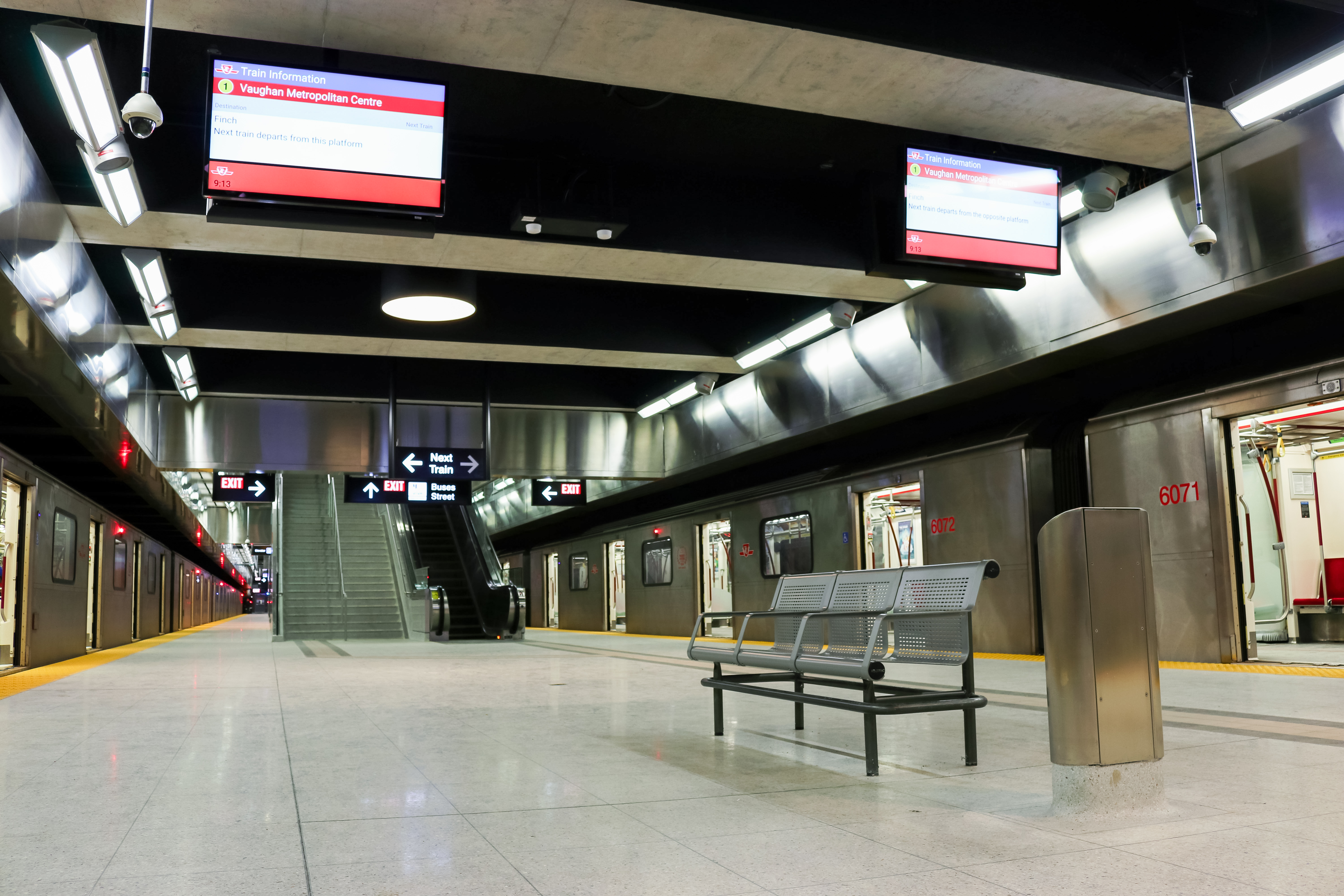
Vaughan Metropolitan Centre station platform

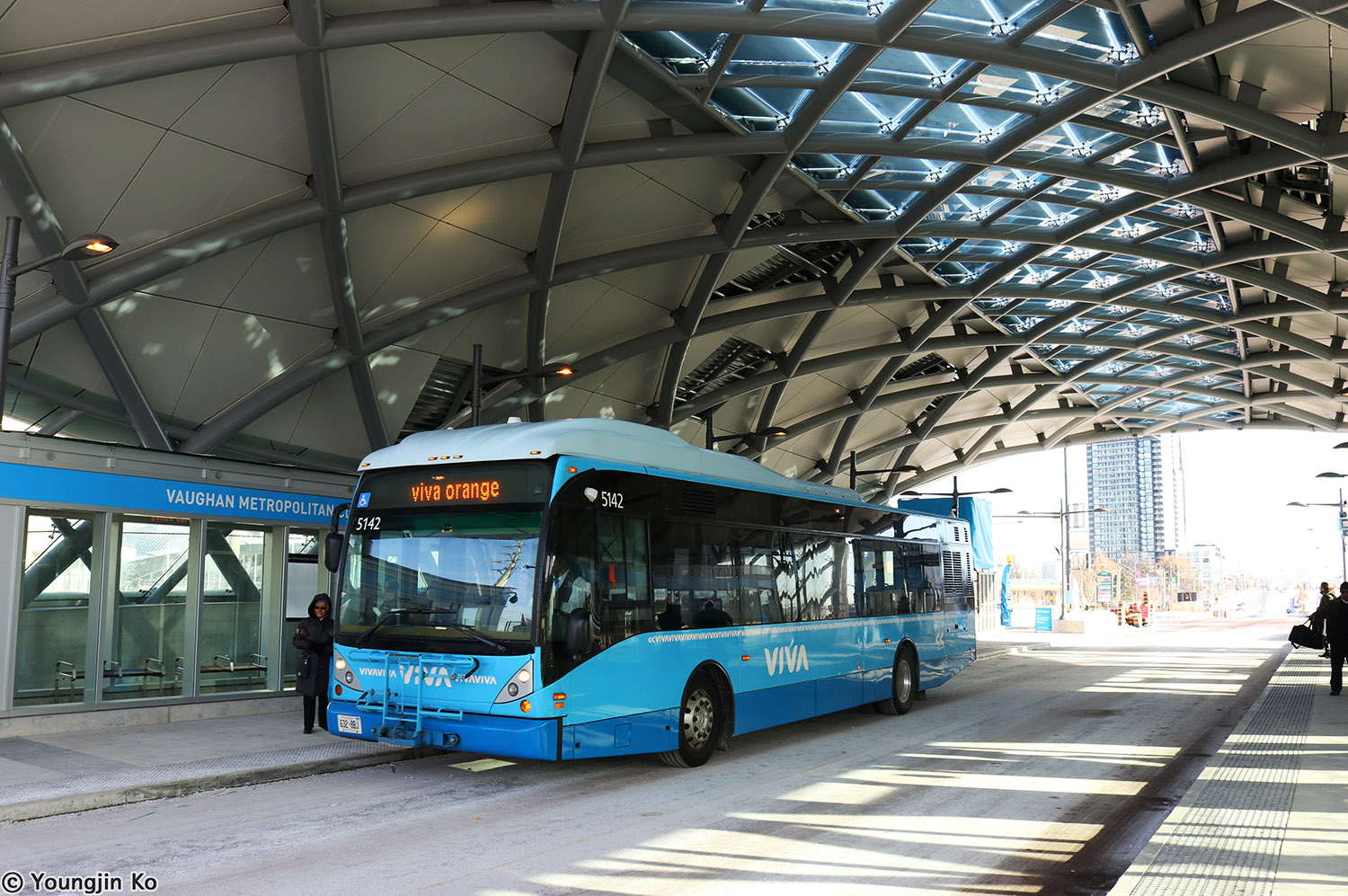
The Rapidway facility at the station

The TTC's Line 1 Yonge–University subway line travels into Vaughan to Highway 7 and Jane Street and opened on December 17, 2017. The three stations in Vaughan are named Pioneer Village, Highway 407, and Vaughan Metropolitan Centre. Unlike the case with TTC-operated buses, no extra fare is charged for travel into Vaughan.

Station name	Architect	Artist	Location/intersection
Pioneer Village	Alsop Architects with SGA/IBI Group Architects	realities:united (Tim and Yan Edler)	Straddles the Vaughan/Toronto boundary at York University. Steeles Avenue and Northwest Gate
Highway 407	Aedas	David Pearl	Highway 407 and Jane Street
Vaughan Metropolitan Centre	Arup with Grimshaw Architects	Paul Raff Studio	Vaughan Metropolitan Centre / Highway 7 and Millway Avenue (west of Jane St.)

==== Bus ====
There is also one TTC-contracted bus route operating within Vaughan, which serves Bathurst Street. Unlike the subway, a special fare policy applies to this route. A passenger who boards a TTC contracted bus in Vaughan and travels only within Vaughan may transfer to YRT operated bus routes without paying a second fare. A passenger who boards in Vaughan and travels into Toronto (or from Toronto into York) must pay an extra fare to continue their trip into the other transit system's territory. There were formerly five TTC-contracted bus routes serving major north–south streets which continued north from Toronto prior to the subway extension, but four were replaced with YRT routes because of route restructuring after the subway opened.

== Rail ==
The Barrie line, operated by GO Transit, provides the only passenger service to Vaughan. The two stations in the city are Rutherford GO Station, on Rutherford Road east of Keele Street and south of Rutherford Road, and Maple GO Station in Maple, located north of Major Mackenzie Drive and east of Keele Street. The line terminates at Barrie in the north and at Union Station in Toronto in the south.

== Roads ==
In terms of road systems, Vaughan is strongly influenced by its southerly neighbour, Toronto. Vaughan inherits a grid-like road network, funded by three levels of government. The government of Ontario funds the provincial highways across the town; the government of York Region funds most of its arterial and main routes throughout the town; and the government of Vaughan funds all local routes, and some arterial routes.

=== Provincial highways ===
The Ontario government funds only certain roads across Vaughan and designates them as Ontario Provincial Highways. These include Highways 400 and 427. Highway 400 serves as a major expressway linking Toronto, Vaughan, and Northern Ontario. Prior to the 1998 massive downloading, the Ontario government also maintained Highway 7 (now York Regional Road 7), Highway 11 ((Yonge Street), now York Regional Road 1), Highway 50 (now York Regional Road 24), and Highway 27 (now York Regional Road 27).

=== York Regional Roads ===
Most of the main arteries are urban "county" roads, maintained by York Region. Each of them is assigned with a number, which is shown by a shield shaped like a flowerpot. York Regional Roads are concession roads laid out in a grid, which is mostly contiguous with the road grid in Toronto to the south; a pattern resulting from Toronto formerly being part of York Region's predecessor: York County. The regional road grid is square, with roads spaced roughly two kilometres (1 1/4 mile) apart, and most of the north–south routes are continuations of major Toronto arterial streets. The regional road system is particularly successful since the landscape across Vaughan and York Region is relatively flat.

Most of the York Regional Roads within Vaughan are four or six lanes, with a few exceptions in the rural areas to the north and west, where they are mostly two lanes.

=== Municipal roads ===
The City of Vaughan maintains all secondary arteries and side streets. Roads owned by Vaughan are usually used for local travel within the city, although some such as Martin Grove Road and Clark Avenue cross municipal boundaries. Most vehicles travelling to other nearby municipalities use regional roads. They are called the "municipal main streets" but are typically relatively lightly travelled. Those roads often serve as an alternative to congested regional roads.

=== Privately controlled ===
In addition, Highway 407 Express Toll Route (407 ETR) is a major tolled east–west expressway. It is now privately controlled but was once provincially controlled. The highway serves as a bypass to Highway 401 and Highway 7, which are very busy roadways. Users of Highway 407 pay tolls based on distance travelled and vehicle type and are billed monthly.

Cameras installed on the highway's onramps and offramps of Highway 407 capture either the rear license plate number or transponder information from vehicles using the road. Transponders may be leased from Highway 407 for automobile users. Vehicles over five tonnes must use a transponder to use the road. Vehicle owners without a transponder are charged a "video toll charge" in addition to regular toll charges.

Highway 407 has an arrangement with the Ontario Ministry of Transportation requiring that all outstanding fees must be paid for drivers to renew their driving licenses.

Highway 407 primarily serves Vaughan from Highway 50 to Yonge Street. The highway connects Vaughan with Pickering, to the east, and Burlington, to the west.

== See also ==
- Transportation in Markham, Ontario
- Transportation in Mississauga
- Transportation in Toronto
