= Transportation in Mississauga =

In the northeast corner of Mississauga is Toronto Pearson International Airport (blue), the largest airport in Canada. Three GO Transit lines (dashed lines) have stations in the city, the Kitchener line (top right, adjacent to airport), the Milton line from central east to northwest, and the Lakeshore West line in the south. Provincial highways running east-west are Highway 401 in the north, Highway 403 centrally, and the Queen Elizabeth Way in the south. Provincial highways running north-south are Highway 407 in the west, Highway 410 centrally, and Highway 409 and Highway 427 in the east.

The transport infrastructure and services in the Canadian city of Mississauga, Ontario include provincial highways and municipal roads, passenger and freight rail, regional and municipal bus service, and an international airport. It is interconnected with air, road, and rail transportation networks spanning the Greater Toronto Area and beyond.

== Rail ==
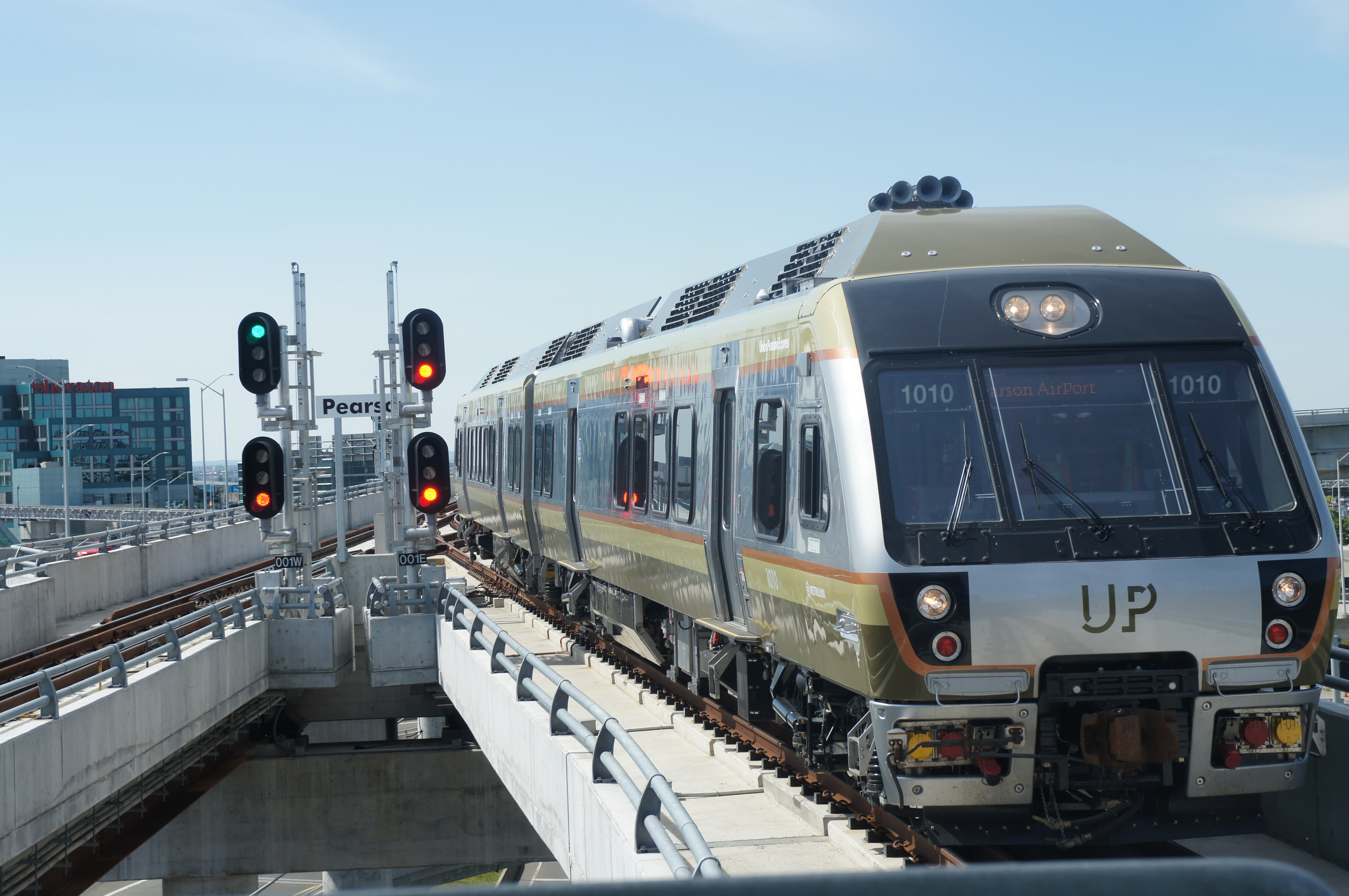
Union Pearson Express train approaching Pearson Airport station

Mississauga has rail networks that include three GO Transit lines, an airport rail link, and a light rail transit (LRT) line that is currently under construction.

=== GO Transit ===
Three GO Transit rail lines serve Mississauga.

The Kitchener line has one stop in Mississauga, at the Malton GO Station in Malton. The station also has Via Rail service, regional GO bus service, and municipal MiWay bus service.

Six of the nine stations on the Milton line are located in Mississauga. Dixie GO Station in the Dixie neighbourhood, Cooksville GO Station in the Cooksville neighbourhood, Erindale GO Station in the community of Erindale, Streetsville GO Station in Streetsville, Meadowvale GO Station in the community of Meadowvale, and Lisgar GO Station in the Lisgar neighbourhood of Meadowvale. All have regional GO bus service and connect with municipal MiWay bus service. Lisgar GO Station is the western terminus of the 511 Züm Steeles bus rapid transit (BRT) route operated by Brampton Transit.

The Lakeshore West line has two stops in Mississauga. Port Credit GO Station in the Port Credit neighbourhood and Clarkson GO Station in the neighbourhood of Clarkson both have connections with GO Transit and MiWay bus services. Clarkson GO Station also has Oakville Transit bus service.

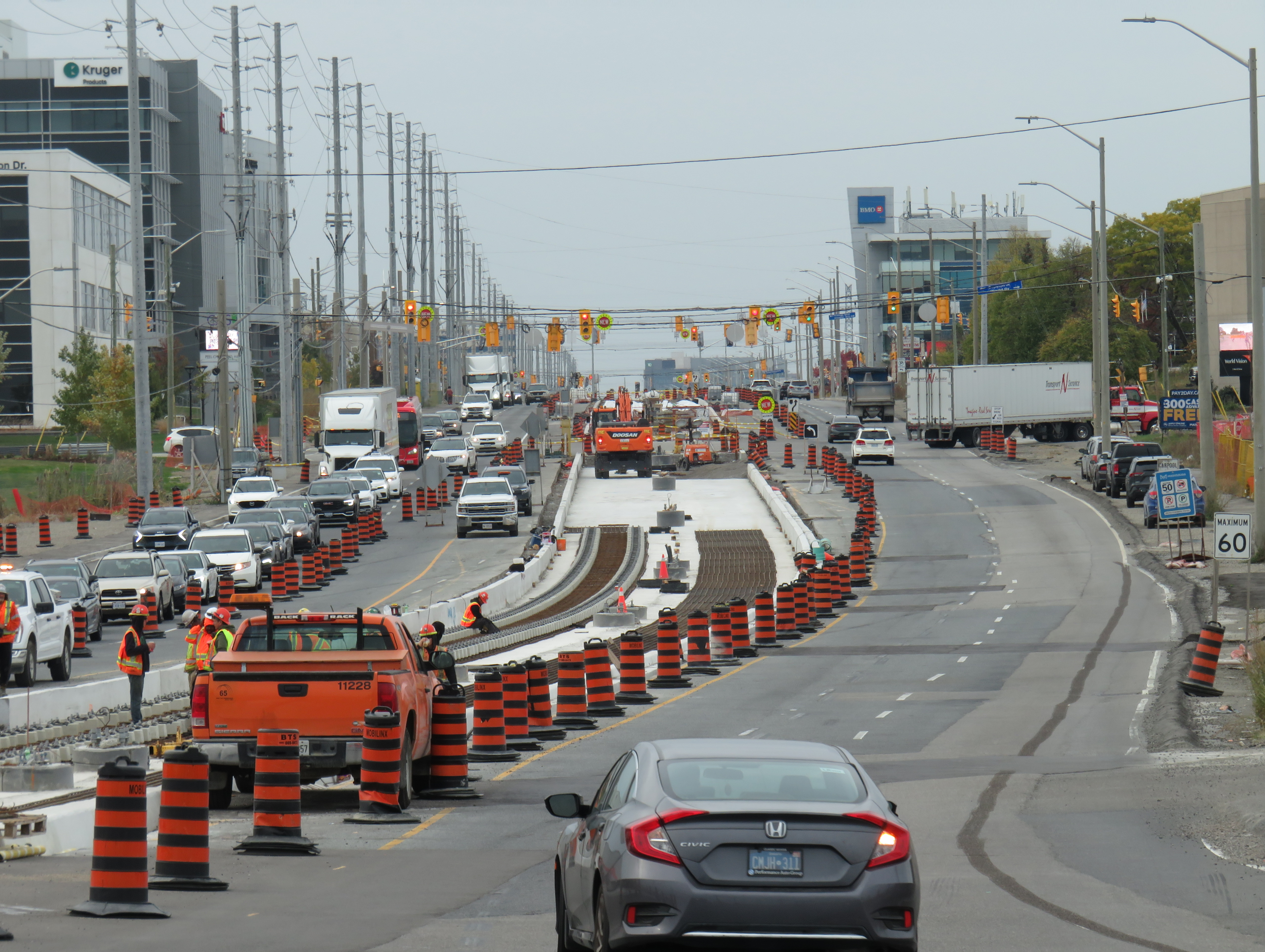
The Hurontario LRT under construction north of Highway 401 in 2023

=== Airport rail link ===
Union Pearson Express is an airport rail link connecting Toronto Pearson International Airport in Mississauga with Union Station in Downtown Toronto that began service in June 2015. It has one station in Mississauga, Pearson Airport station, located at Terminal 1 of the airport.

=== Light rail ===
The Hurontario LRT is an under construction 18-kilometre (11 mi) light rail line that will operate along Hurontario Street into Brampton. It will connect with Cooksville GO Station and Port Credit GO Station, and have stops with intersecting bus rapid transit corridors, including the Dundas Street BRT along Dundas Street, the planned 407 Transitway along Highway 407, and the Mississauga Transitway at the City Centre Transit Terminal on Rathburn Road.

== Public transit (bus) ==
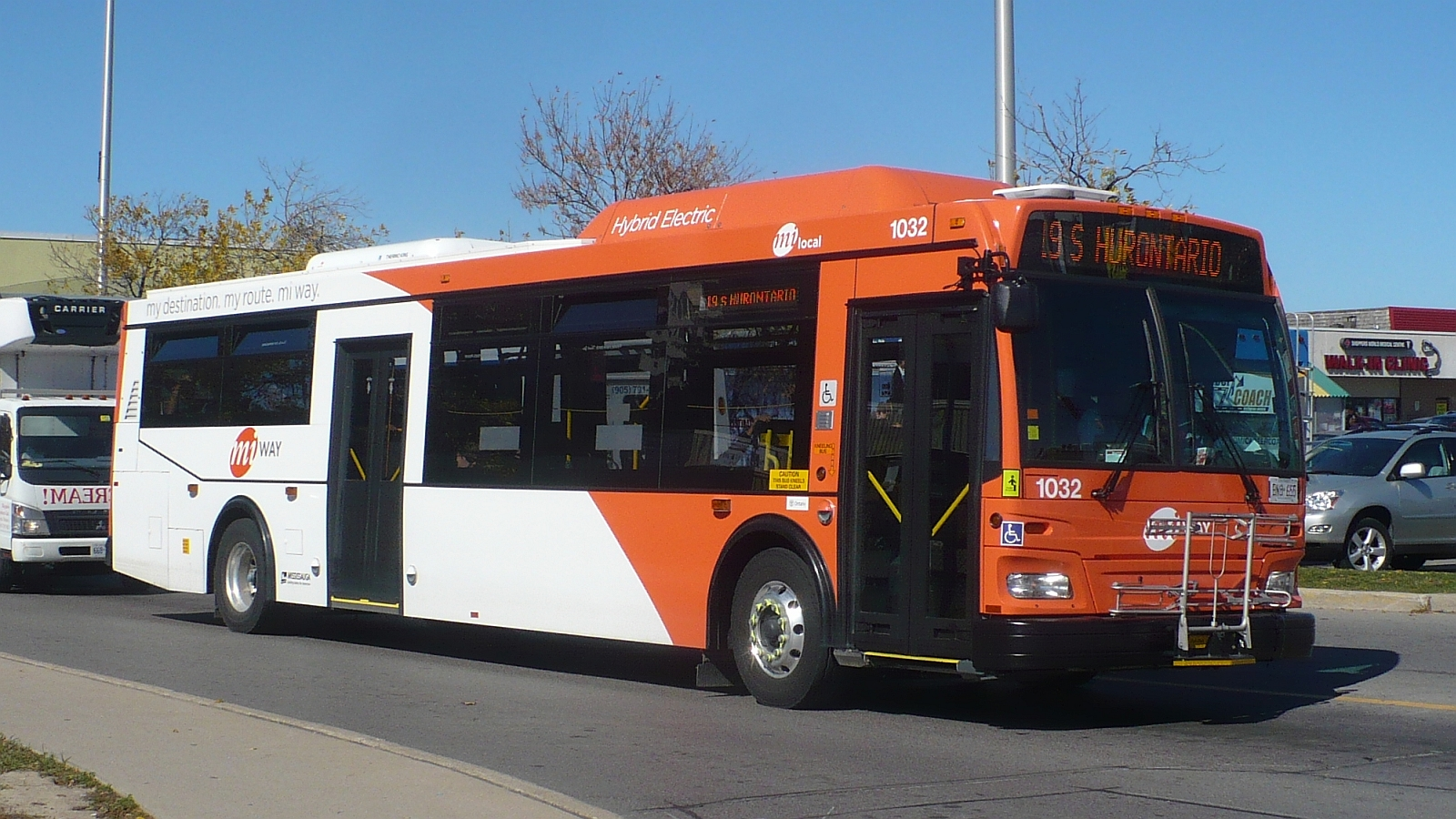
A MiWay bus

The city provides bus service via its public transport agency MiWay, operated by the Transportation and Works department. This includes the Mississauga Transitway; an 18-kilometre (11 mi) grade-separated BRT system spanning most of the city, adjacent to Highway 403 from Winston Churchill Boulevard to Cawthra Road, then paralleling Eastgate Parkway and crossing to the north side of Eglinton Avenue, which it parallels to its terminus at Renforth Drive.

MiWay service connects to the commuter rail service of GO Transit at its stations throughout Mississauga along three railway lines. It also has connections with nearby transit systems, namely Brampton Transit to the north, Oakville Transit to the west, York Region Transit to the northeast, and the Toronto Transit Commission (TTC) to the east; where a number of bus routes serve the TTC's Line 2 Bloor–Danforth at the Islington and Kipling stations of the Toronto subway.

== Highways ==
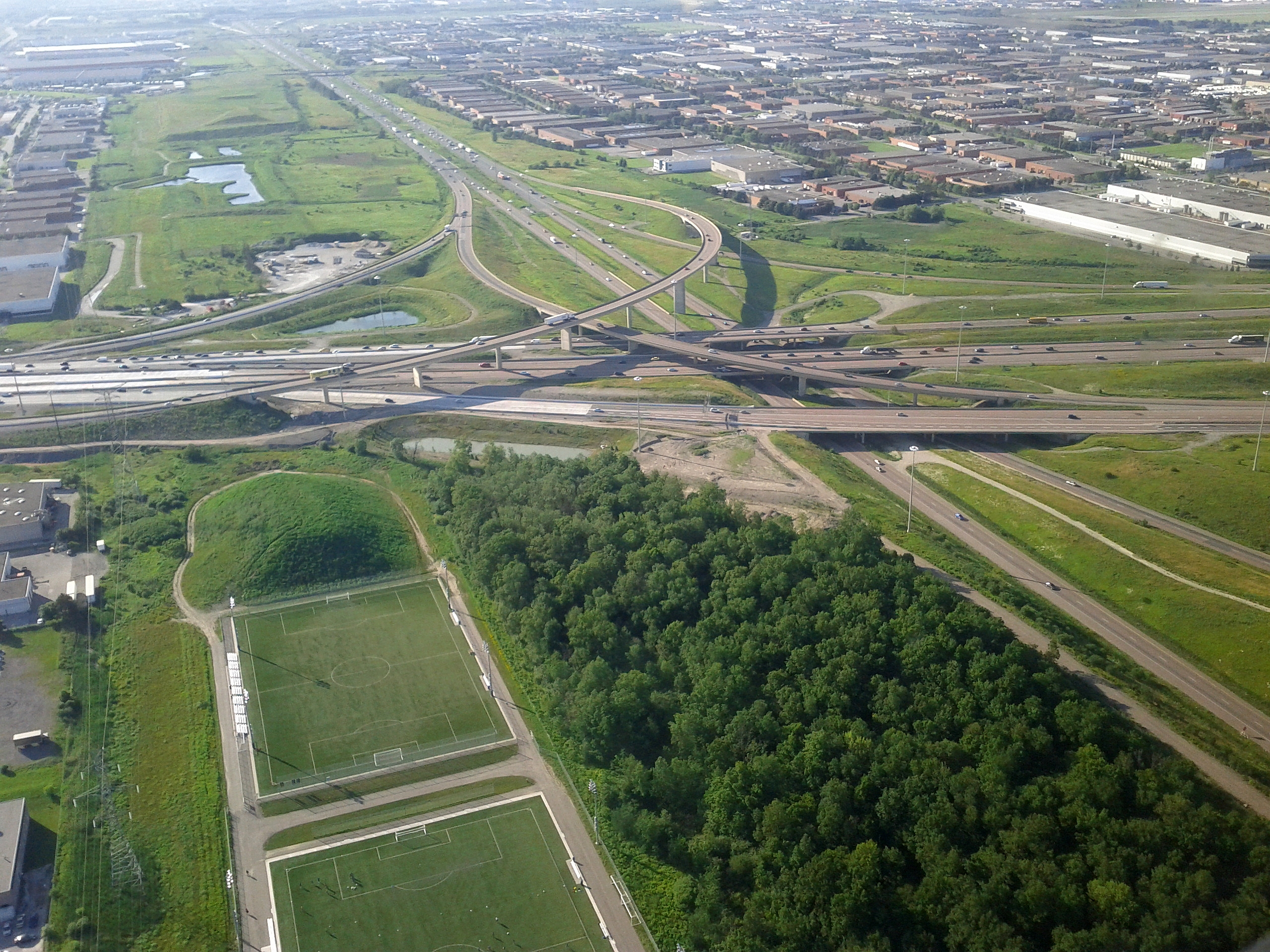
Looking northward at the intersection of Highway 401 (middle) with Highway 410 (top) and Highway 403 (bottom).

The Queen Elizabeth Way traverses the southern end of the city from Etobicoke in the northeast to Oakville in the southwest. Also continuing from Etobicoke into Mississauga is Highway 401, which passes south of Toronto Pearson International Airport to the northwest corner of the city and into Milton. There, it intersects with Highway 407, an electronically tolled highway running northeast into Brampton, and southeast toward Lake Ontario and which median defines the municipal boundary between Mississauga and Milton. Where it intersects Highway 403 is the location of the boundaries between Milton in the southwest, Oakville in the southeast, and Mississauga in the north. Highway 401 has six interchanges in Mississauga.

Highway 403 traverses Mississauga to the northeast, turning northwest at Cawthra Road until it intersects Highway 401, where it terminates at a stack interchange. From this point, the highway continues northwest as Highway 410 towards Brampton, where it intersects Highway 407.

Highway 427 defines some of the municipal boundary between Mississauga and Toronto on the northeast side of Toronto Pearson International Airport, and is intersected by Highway 409 which terminates at the airport and traverses eastward to Highway 401 in Toronto.

The proposed GTA West Corridor would connect to the interchange at Highway 401 and Highway 407 at the northwest periphery of the city.

== Airport ==
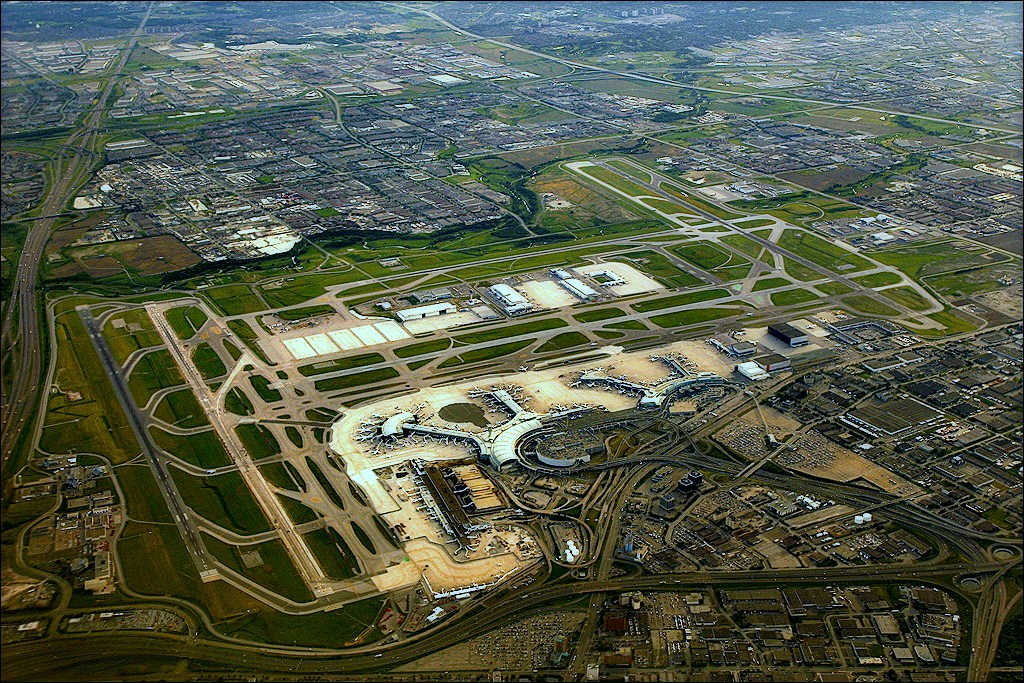
An aerial photograph of Toronto Pearson International Airport looking west-southwest. The white arced building is Terminal 1, and the partially arced building to its right is Terminal 3, the two passenger terminals at the airport.

Toronto Pearson International Airport (YYZ) is the busiest airport in Canada with over 40 million passengers in 2015. It is an international airport which serves the city of Toronto and municipalities in the Greater Toronto Area and beyond. Non-stop domestic flights to all major and many secondary cities throughout Canada are operated from the airport by several airlines. In 1952, the airport became the first in the world to provide facilities for United States border preclearance for flights to the United States.

As of 2013 the airport had 1.2 million sq ft (0.11 million m^{2}) of cargo-handling facilities and a dedicated cargo apron of 2.5 million sq ft (0.23 million m^{2}) with an annual capacity of 1 million t (0.98 million long tons).

== Cycling ==
The municipal government of Mississauga created a Cycling Master Plan in 2010 and a finalized plan in 2018 that will result in the implementation of 897 kilometres (557 mi) of cycling infrastructure to be built by 2045. These will include:

- cycle tracks that are physically separated from roads by a curb
- bicycle lanes that are separated from roads by barriers such as planters or bollards
- bicycle lanes adjacent to road lanes
- trails within parks (many cycle tracks are also designated as trails)
- other routes shared by cyclists and motorists, such as low-speed roads

As of 2018 the city had 54 kilometres (34 mi) of bicycle lanes, 88 kilometres (55 mi) of boulevard multi-use trails, 221 kilometres (137 mi) of off-road multi-use trails, and 91 kilometres (57 mi) of shared routes. The cost to expand the network is expected to be about $267 million in annual investments of about $5.3 million.

== Modalities ==
About 82% of trips of up to 5 kilometres (3.1 mi) within the city are with cars. As of 2016, 0.6% of trips are completed using a bicycle by 0.3% of the city's residents; of these, 87% are less than 5 kilometres.

== Safety ==
The government of the Regional Municipality of Peel established a Vision Zero policy in December 2017 to reduce road-related injuries and fatalities. The goal was to reduce such incidents by 10% by 2022, and to (potentially) completely eliminate them in the long term. A resolution to adopt this policy was passed by Mississauga City Council in February 2018.

Of the 473 reported collisions involving bicycles from 2010 to 2013, half resulted in an injury, 10 of which were major injuries, and 4 of which were fatal. Over 90% of these occurred at or near intersections.

== Future ==
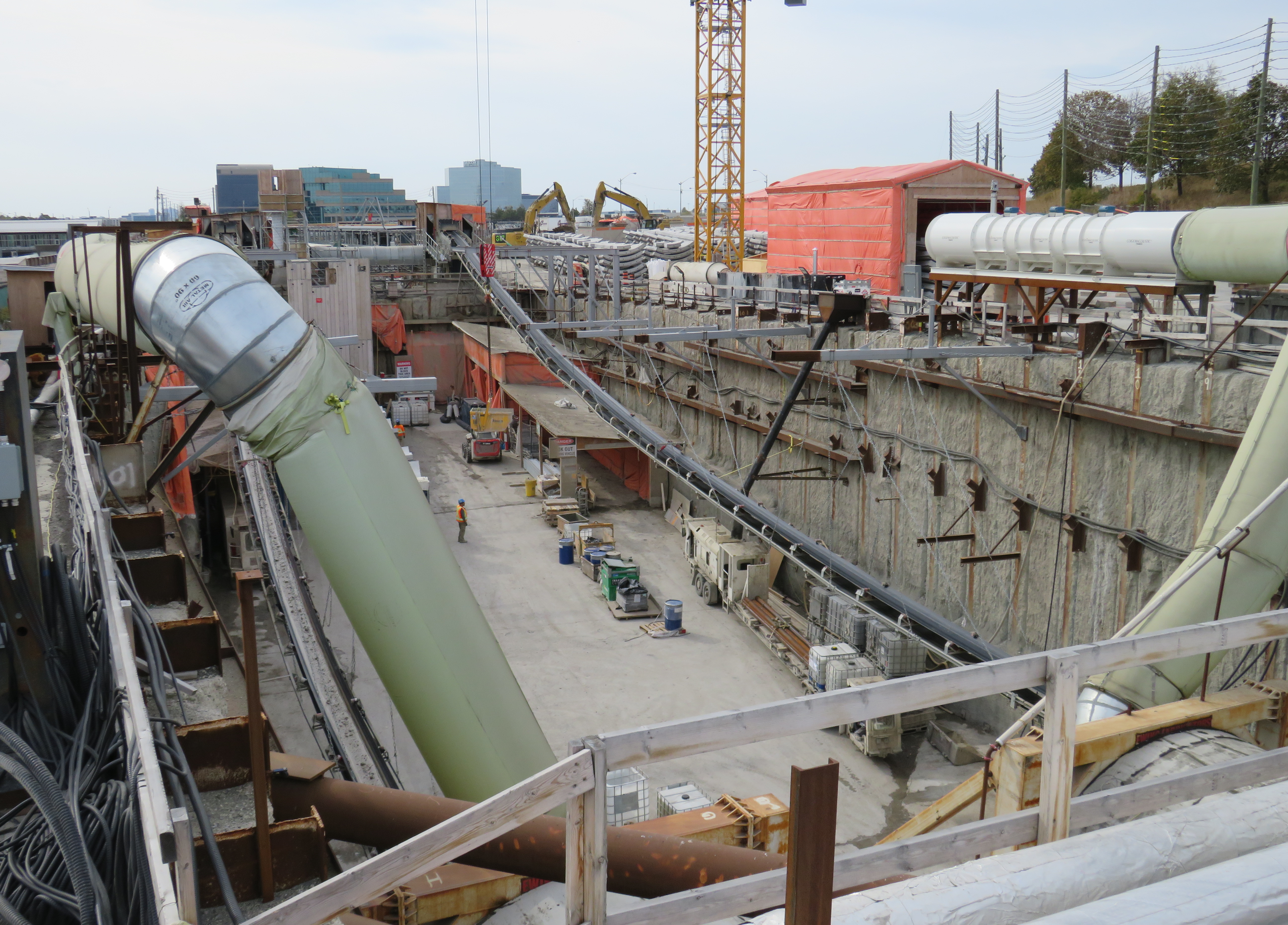
Renforth station (LRT) under construction in October 2023

An extension of Line 5 Eglinton, an underground light rail line, is under construction in both Mississauga and Toronto that will have a single station in Mississauga adjacent to the Mississauga Transitway's Renforth station. Construction is expected to be completed circa 2030 or 2031, with a later extension to the proposed Pearson Regional Transit Centre to be built later.

The proposed Downtown Mississauga Terminal and Transitway Connection is a "critical piece of transit infrastructure" that would serve the Hurontario LRT, the Mississauga Transitway, and Miway and GO Transit buses.

Two bus rapid transit lines are proposed for the city, one operating along a 2 kilometres (1.2 mi) segment of Lakeshore Road and the other a 48 kilometres (30 mi) line along Dundas Street from Kipling station in Toronto to Highway 6 in Hamilton.

== See also ==
- Transportation in Markham, Ontario
- Transportation in Toronto
- Transportation in Vaughan
