= List of GO Transit stations =

GO Transit serves the Greater Toronto Area in Southern Ontario, Canada with the following stations:

== Train ==
GO Transit rail stations
Corridor	Station	Code	Location	Coordinates	Platforms	Parking	Fare zone	Opening year (for GO service)
All	Union	UN	65 Front Street, Toronto	43°38′44″N 79°22′46″W	17	0	2	1967
Lakeshore West	Exhibition	EX	100 Manitoba Drive, Toronto	43°38′09″N 79°25′09″W	2	0	2	1967
Lakeshore West	Mimico	MI	315 Royal York Road, Toronto	43°36′59″N 79°29′50″W	4	330	3	1967
Lakeshore West	Long Branch	LO	20 Brow Drive, Toronto	43°35′31″N 79°32′44″W	3	49	3	1967
Lakeshore West	Port Credit	PO	30 Queen Street East, Mississauga	43°33′20″N 79°35′15″W	3	946	11	1967
Lakeshore West	Clarkson	CL	1110 Southdown Road, Mississauga	43°30′46″N 79°38′02″W	3	3199	12	1967
Lakeshore West	Oakville	OA	214 Cross Avenue, Oakville	43°27′17″N 79°40′58″W	4	4334	13	1967
Lakeshore West	Bronte	BO	2104 Wyecroft Road, Oakville	43°25′02″N 79°43′19″W	3	2764	14	1967
Lakeshore West	Appleby	AP	5111 Fairview Street, Burlington	43°22′45″N 79°45′40″W	3	2964	15	1988
Lakeshore West	Burlington	BU	2101 Fairview Street, Burlington	43°20′29″N 79°48′33″W	3	2105	16	1980
Lakeshore West	Aldershot	AL	1199 Waterdown Road, Burlington	43°18′46″N 79°51′19″W	4	1689	17	1992
Lakeshore West	Hamilton	HA	36 Hunter Street East, Hamilton	43°15′11″N 79°52′09″W	2	0	18	1996
Lakeshore West	West Harbour	WR	353 James Street North, Hamilton	43°15′56″N 79°51′55″W	2	46	18	2015
Lakeshore West	Confederation	CF	397 Centennial Parkway, Hamilton	43°14′30″N 79°45′33″W	1	148	80	2025
Lakeshore West	St. Catharines	SCTH	5 Great Western Street, St. Catharines	43°08′52″N 79°15′20″W	1	0	83	2009
Lakeshore West	Niagara Falls	NI	4267 Bridge Street, Niagara Falls	43°06′32″N 79°03′49″W	1	0	84	2009
Lakeshore East	Danforth	DA	213 Main Street, Toronto	43°41′12″N 79°17′58″W	3	0	6	1967
Lakeshore East	Scarborough	SC	3615 St Clair Avenue East, Toronto	43°43′01″N 79°15′18″W	3	626	6	1967
Lakeshore East	Eglinton	EG	2995 Eglinton Avenue East, Toronto	43°44′22″N 79°13′56″W	2	836	6	1967
Lakeshore East	Guildwood	GU	4105 Kingston Road, Toronto	43°45′18″N 79°11′53″W	3	1437	8	1967
Lakeshore East	Rouge Hill	RO	6251 Lawrence Avenue East, Toronto	43°46′49″N 79°07′49″W	2	1407	9	1967
Lakeshore East	Pickering	PIN	1322 Bayly Street, Pickering	43°49′52″N 79°05′09″W	3	3589	91	1967
Lakeshore East	Ajax	AJ	100 Westney Road South, Ajax	43°50′54″N 79°02′30″W	2	1644	92	1988
Lakeshore East	Whitby	WH	1350 Brock Street South, Whitby	43°51′53″N 78°56′17″W	2	3930	93	1988
Lakeshore East	Oshawa	OS	915 Bloor Street West, Oshawa	43°52′15″N 78°53′05″W	2	2643	94	1995
Milton	Kipling	KP	27 St Albans Road, Toronto	43°38′09″N 79°32′14″W	2	0	3	1981
Milton	Dixie	DI	2445 Dixie Road, Mississauga	43°36′28″N 79°34′39″W	1	936	11	1981
Milton	Cooksville	CO	3210 Hurontario Street, Mississauga	43°35′00″N 79°37′26″W	1	1675	11	1981
Milton	Erindale	ER	1320 Rathburn Road West, Mississauga	43°34′08″N 79°40′08″W	2	2201	12	1981
Milton	Streetsville	SR	45 Thomas Street, Mississauga	43°34′34″N 79°42′31″W	2	1540	21	1981
Milton	Meadowvale	ME	6845 Millcreek Drive, Mississauga	43°35′52″N 79°45′15″W	1	2010	22	1981
Milton	Lisgar	LS	3250 Argentia Road, Mississauga	43°35′26″N 79°47′18″W	1	792	23	2007
Milton	Milton	ML	780 Main Street East, Milton	43°31′24″N 79°52′01″W	1	1567	24	1981
Kitchener	Bloor	BL	1456 Bloor Street West, Toronto	43°39′29″N 79°27′03″W	3	0	2	1975
Kitchener	Mount Dennis	MD	3500 Eglinton Avenue West, Toronto	43°41′15″N 79°29′14″W	3	4	4	2025
Kitchener	Weston	WE	1865 Weston Road, Toronto	43°42′01″N 79°30′48″W	3	295	4	1974
Kitchener	Etobicoke North	ET	1949 Kipling Avenue, Toronto	43°42′23″N 79°33′45″W	1	687	4	1974
Kitchener	Malton	MA	3060 Derry Road East, Mississauga	43°42′18″N 79°38′18″W	3	779	31	1974
Kitchener	Bramalea	BE	1713 Steeles Avenue, Brampton	43°42′06″N 79°41′28″W	3	2377	32	1974
Kitchener	Brampton	BR	27 Church Street West, Brampton	43°41′12″N 79°45′53″W	2	933	33	1974
Kitchener	Mount Pleasant	MO	1600 Bovaird Drive West, Brampton	43°40′30″N 79°49′22″W	3	1116	34	2005
Kitchener	Georgetown	GE	55 Queen Street, Georgetown	43°39′20″N 79°55′07″W	4	625	35	1978
Kitchener	Acton	AC	39 Eastern Avenue, Acton	43°38′02″N 80°02′04″W	1	45	37	2013
Kitchener	Guelph	GL	79 Carden Street, Guelph	43°32′41″N 80°14′47″W	1	12	39	2011
Kitchener	Kitchener	KI	126 Weber Street West, Kitchener	43°27′20″N 80°29′36″W	1	0	27	2011
Kitchener	Stratford	SF	101 Shakespeare Street, Stratford	43°21′52″N 80°58′30″W	2	0	47	2026
Barrie	Downsview Park	DW	1212 Sheppard Avenue West, Toronto	43°45′14″N 79°28′42″W	1	0	19	2017
Barrie	Rutherford	RU	699 Westburne Drive, Vaughan	43°50′18″N 79°29′54″W	1	970	61	2001
Barrie	Maple	MP	30 Station Street, Vaughan	43°51′34″N 79°30′26″W	1	1319	61	1982
Barrie	King City	KC	7 Station Road, King City	43°55′12″N 79°31′37″W	1	555	62	1982
Barrie	Aurora	AU	121 Wellington Street East, Aurora	44°00′03″N 79°27′36″W	1	1462	63	1982
Barrie	Newmarket	NE	465 Davis Drive, Newmarket	44°03′39″N 79°27′37″W	1	265	64	1982
Barrie	East Gwillimbury	EA	845 Green Lane East, East Gwillimbury	44°04′40″N 79°27′19″W	1	646	44	2004
Barrie	Bradford	BD	300 Holland Street East, Bradford	44°07′02″N 79°33′22″W	2	359	65	1982
Barrie	Barrie South	BA	833 Yonge Street, Barrie	44°21′04″N 79°37′39″W	1	619	68	2007
Barrie	Allandale Waterfront	AD	24 Essa Road, Barrie	44°22′29″N 79°41′19″W	1	160	69	2011
Richmond Hill	Oriole	OR	3300 Leslie Street, Toronto	43°45′55″N 79°21′53″W	1	295	5	1978
Richmond Hill	Old Cummer	OL	5760 Leslie Street, Toronto	43°47′33″N 79°22′16″W	1	466	5	1978
Richmond Hill	Langstaff	LA	10 Red Maple Road, Richmond Hill	43°50′18″N 79°25′24″W	1	1137	60	1978
Richmond Hill	Richmond Hill	RI	6 Newkirk Road, Richmond Hill	43°52′30″N 79°25′36″W	1	2324	61	1978
Richmond Hill	Gormley	GO	1650 Stouffville Road, Richmond Hill	43°56′27″N 79°23′53″W	1	850	62	2016
Richmond Hill	Bloomington	BM	1796 York Regional Road 40, Richmond Hill	43°58′33″N 79°23′53″W	1	1000	98	2021
Stouffville	Kennedy	KE	2467 Eglinton Avenue East, Toronto	43°43′56″N 79°15′45″W	1	0	77	2005
Stouffville	Agincourt	AG	4100 Sheppard Avenue East, Toronto	43°47′08″N 79°17′02″W	1	342	7	1982
Stouffville	Milliken	MK	39 Redlea Avenue, Toronto	43°49′24″N 79°18′06″W	2	665	70	2005
Stouffville	Unionville	UI	155 YMCA Boulevard, Markham	43°51′06″N 79°18′53″W	3	1620	71	1991
Stouffville	Centennial	CE	320 Bullock Drive, Markham	43°52′25″N 79°17′22″W	1	451	72	2004
Stouffville	Markham	MR	214 Main Street North, Markham	43°52′58″N 79°15′45″W	2	413	72	1982
Stouffville	Mount Joy	MJ	1801 Bur Oak Avenue, Markham	43°54′01″N 79°15′47″W	1	1333	73	2004
Stouffville	Stouffville	ST	6176 Main Street, Stouffville	43°58′17″N 79°15′00″W	1	243	74	1982
Stouffville	Old Elm	LI	12958 Tenth Line, Stouffville	43°59′25″N 79°14′13″W	1	673	74	2008

== Planned train stations ==
Bold indicates stations currently under construction.

Corridor	Station	Location	Planned opening date
Lakeshore West	Park Lawn	Lake Shore Boulevard, Toronto	TBD
Lakeshore West	**Grimsby**	Casablanca Boulevard, Grimsby	2027
Lakeshore East	**East Harbour**	Eastern Avenue, Toronto	2028
Lakeshore East	**Thornton's Corners East**	Fox Street, Oshawa	TBD
Lakeshore East	**Ritson Road**	Front Street, Oshawa	TBD
Lakeshore East	**Courtice**	Courtice Road, Clarington	TBD
Lakeshore East	**Bowmanville**	Bowmanville Avenue, Clarington	TBD
Kitchener	King–Liberty	Sudbury Street, Toronto	TBD
Kitchener	**Woodbine**	Highway 27, Toronto	TBD
Kitchener	Breslau	Fountain Street, Woolwich	TBD
Kitchener	Kitchener Central	King Street, Kitchener	2029
Barrie	Spadina–Front	Spadina Avenue, Toronto	TBD
Barrie	**Junction Triangle**	Bloor Street, Toronto	2027
Barrie	**Caledonia**	Eglinton Avenue, Toronto	TBD
Barrie	Kirby	Kirby Road, Vaughan	TBD
Barrie	Mulock	Mulock Drive, Newmarket	TBD
Barrie	Innisfil	6th Line, Innisfil	TBD
Stouffville	**East Harbour**	Eastern Avenue, Toronto	2028
Stouffville	Finch–Kennedy	Finch Avenue, Toronto	TBD

== Bus ==
- Bramalea Terminal
- Brampton Terminal
- Cornell
- Dixie Transitway
- Erin Mills Transitway
- Finch
- Hamilton
- Hwy 407
- Kipling Terminal
- McMaster University
- Pearson Airport Terminal 1
- Renforth Transitway
- Richmond Hill Centre
- Scarborough Centre
- Square One
- Trinity Common
- Union Station
- University of Toronto Scarborough
- University of Waterloo
- Winston Churchill Transitway
- York Mills
- Yorkdale
