= Acton GO Station =

Railway station in Halton Hills, Ontario, Canada

Acton
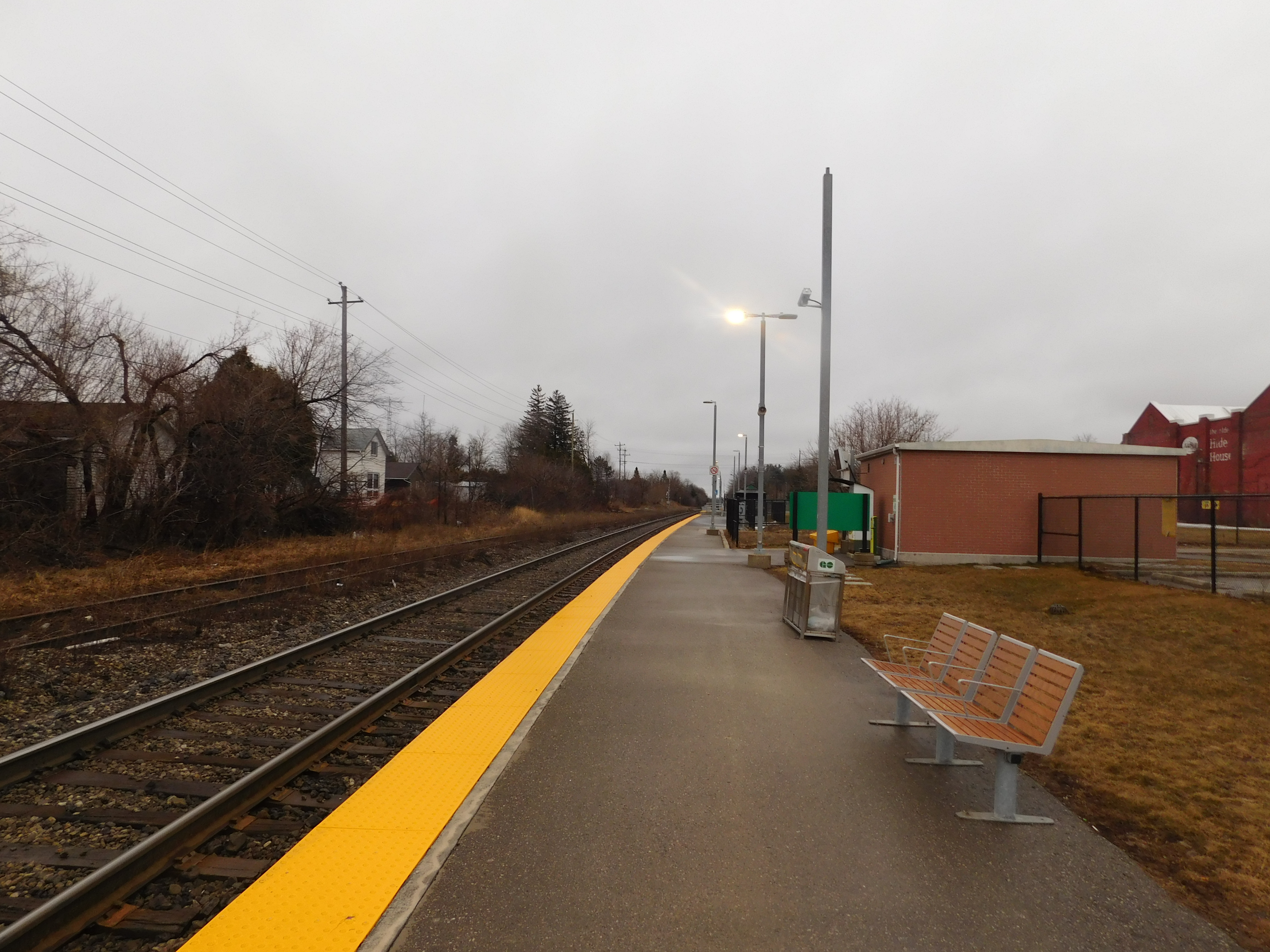
- Acton station in March 2019

General information
- Location: Eastern Avenue; Halton Hills, Ontario; Canada
- Coordinates: 43°38′02″N 80°02′05″W
- Owner: Metrolinx
- Bus routes: 31 33

Construction
- Parking: 50 spaces
- Accessible: Yes

Other information
- Station code: GO Transit: AC
- Fare zone: 37

History
- Opened: January 7, 2013; 13 years ago

Passengers
- 2018: 108 (daily average) ▲10.4%

Services
Preceding station	GO Transit	Following station
Guelph Central towards Stratford	Kitchener	Georgetown towards Union
Former services
Preceding station	Canadian National Railway	Following station
Rockwood toward Sarnia	Sarnia – Toronto via Lucan Crossing	Limehouse toward Toronto
Location

Acton GO Station is a railway station in Acton, a community in the town of Halton Hills, Ontario, Canada. It is served by GO Transit's Kitchener line. It is located at the intersection of Mill St East and Eastern Avenue, adjacent to the Old Hide House. Previous Acton stations were operated by the Grand Trunk Railway and, later, the Canadian National Railway.

== History ==
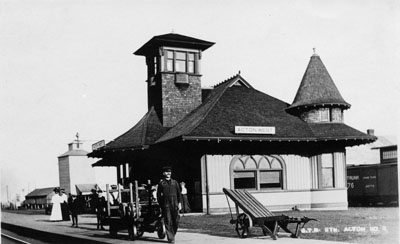
The 1908 station, which has been demolished.

The previous station building near this site in Acton had been constructed in 1908 by the Grand Trunk Railway with the origin of the line dating back to 1856. The line ultimately became part of the Canadian National Railway system and regular service to the town was discontinued in 1967. GO Trains had also stopped at the station for a brief time between 1990 and 1993.

The new Acton station was approved as part of the Georgetown-to-Kitchener Extension Environmental Assessment in 2009. In November 2010, a partial rollout of this plan was announced to be in place by late 2011. Two round trips daily were planned to serve Acton, Guelph and Kitchener with layover for those trains at a small facility in Kitchener. $18 million would be spent to get this first stage operational, with further upgrades to come. Service to Guelph and Kitchener began on December 19, 2011, but trains passed through Acton without stopping, as the Acton station was not ready.

Trains began serving the Acton station on January 7, 2013.
