= History of GO Transit =

GO Transit is an interregional public transit system in the Greater Golden Horseshoe of Ontario, Canada, operated by the provincial crown agency Metrolinx. It primarily serves the conurbation referred to by Metrolinx as the "Greater Toronto and Hamilton Area" (GTHA) with operations extending to several communities in the area centred around Toronto and Hamilton.

== Creation of GO Transit ==
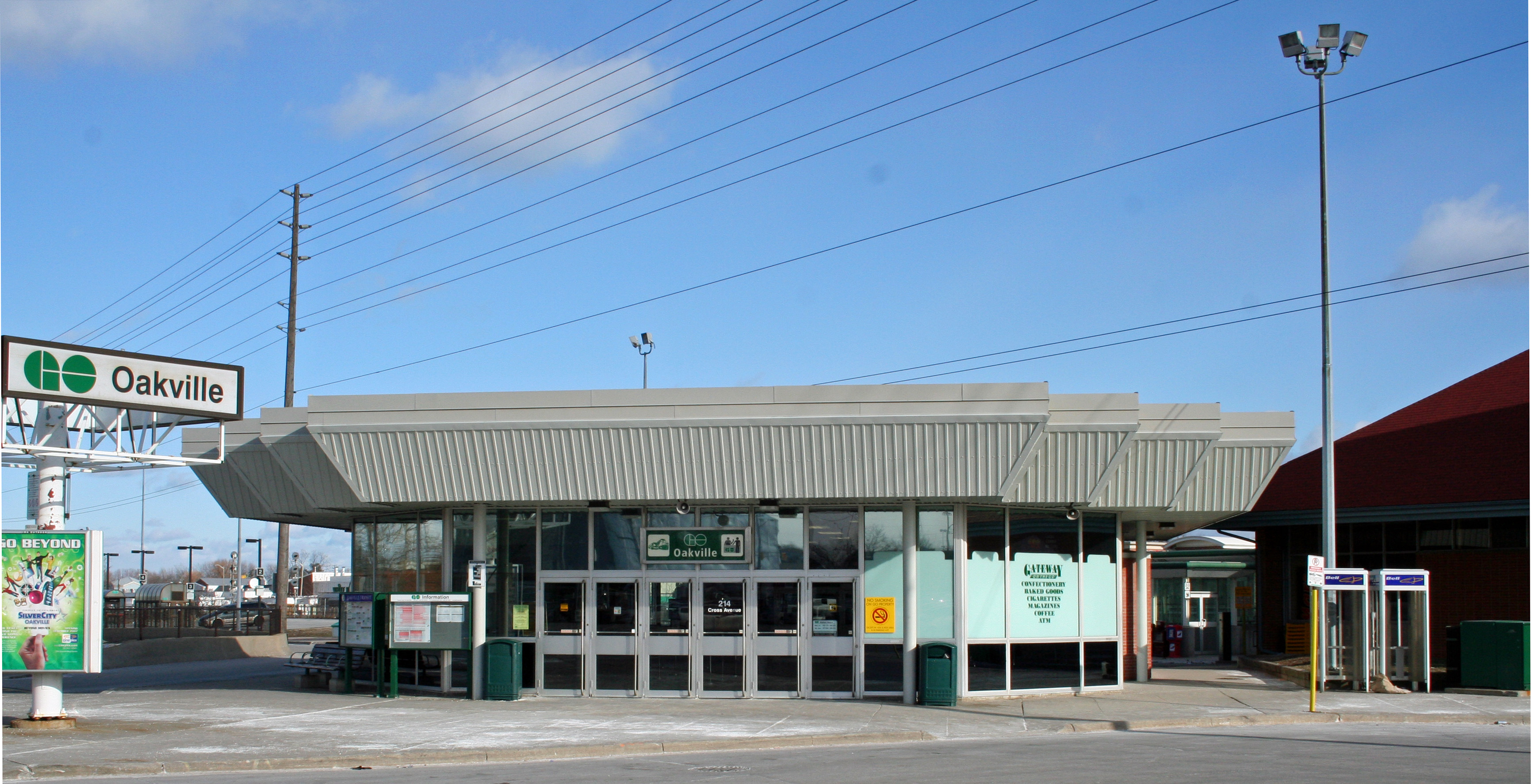
Oakville GO Station, the original western terminus for all-day service

GO Transit was created and funded by the provincial government in 1967 as Government of Ontario Transit (hence the acronym 'GO') and was financed entirely by the Province of Ontario until the end of 1997. The province subsidized any operating costs that were not recovered through revenue, and all capital costs. Responsibility for the system was then transferred to the Toronto Area Transportation Operating Authority (TATOA) and later to the Greater Toronto Services Board as part of the province's 'downloading' initiative, before finally returning to the province as a Crown Agency under Greater Toronto Transit Authority (GTTA).

GO began as a three-year experiment on May 23, 1967, with single deck push pull coaches built by Hawker-Siddeley Canada. GO planned for "50 trains operating on 60 miles of track" with a maximum of 20 minute headways between 6 am and midnight. The total system was delivered was 40 coaches, eight GP40TC locomotives, and eight cab cars. There was also an order for nine self-propelled multiple unit coaches, but they were not delivered until later.

The service ran on a single rail line along Lake Ontario's shoreline. All-day GO Train service ran from Oakville to Pickering with limited rush hour train service to Hamilton. Lakeshore GO trains carried 2.5 million riders that first year and was considered to be a success. GO Bus service, which started out in 1970 as an extension of the original Lakeshore train line, has subsequently become a full-fledged network after taking over Gray Coach Lines' commuter routes. It feeds the rail service and serves communities that trains do not reach.

== Expansion in the 1970s and 1980s ==
Expansion continued in the 1970s with the introduction of the Georgetown line in 1974 and the Richmond Hill line in 1978. Also in 1978 the GO Transit bi-level railcars were introduced, manufactured by Hawker Siddeley Canada, although many of the bi-level trains had to run with a single level cab car at first. In 1979 the GO Concourse at Union Station was built, which was later replaced by the current Bay Concourse. In 1981 the Milton GO Train line opened. In 1982, GO Transit took over VIA Rail service to Barrie and Stouffville, so the Bradford and Stouffville lines opened.

== Proposed GO ALRT system ==
Towards the end of 1982, Ontario Minister of Transportation and Communications, James Snow, announced the launch of GO ALRT (Advanced Light Rail Transit), an interregional light rail transit program. The proposed transit system would have allowed computer controlled trains to run at a maximum frequency of two minutes instead of the usual twenty minutes during rush hour. One line would have replaced the Lakeshore GO Train line and would have run from Hamilton to Oshawa. The other would have connected Oakville with downtown Mississauga, Toronto Pearson Airport, Downtown North York and Scarborough Town Centre before terminating at Pickering. A third line would have run north–south connecting Brampton with Mississauga. The rail cars (designed by the Urban Transportation Development Corporation) started out as an ICTS train - similar to the Scarborough RT - evolved in 1983 to the length of roughly a Toronto subway train. Further redesign in 1984-85 indicated that greater carrying capacity was going to be required resulting in cars similar in length to VIA Rail's LRC coach car. Meanwhile, Hamilton residents were strongly opposed to the plan. The proposal died in 1985 when long time Ontario Progressive Conservative premier Bill Davis was replaced by Frank Miller, who served only a few months in office.

With the end of GO ALRT and the creation of an Ontario Liberal provincial government supported by the Ontario New Democratic Party, it was decided that certain parts of the GO ALRT proposal would live on in the form of an extension of all-day GO Train service to Whitby and Burlington. The tracks between Pickering and Whitby had been built for the GO ALRT system but were soon converted to handle conventional GO Trains. All day GO Train service was brought to Whitby in 1988.

== Reduction of service in the 1990s ==
In the 1990s, the era of continuous growth came to end. Ridership shrank as a result of a recession in the early part of the decade. In spite of this, GO extended limited rush hour GO Train service to Barrie, Guelph, Acton and Oshawa in 1990. In the same year, GO also introduced off-peak train service on the Milton line, much of which only operated as far west as Erindale. In May 1992, while GO Transit celebrated its 25th birthday, all-day GO Train service was extended to Burlington with the building of a new station at Aldershot. However, in 1993 Ontario NDP premier Bob Rae announced his Social Contract program, which would see a "temporary" reduction in spending on services. Consequently, GO Train service to Barrie, Guelph and Acton were eliminated. All day GO Train service to Whitby and Burlington was reduced to rush hours only (while limited rush hour train service to Oshawa and Hamilton remained in place). All day Lakeshore train service existed only between Pickering and Oakville. In 1995 a new set of tracks and a station were built in Oshawa, allowing for frequent rush hour GO Train service to Oshawa. In 1996, off-peak service ceased on the Milton line.

With the election of Mike Harris as Ontario premier in June 1995, plans for expanding GO Transit were put on hold as part of an overall reduction in government spending.

== Shifting of responsibilities ==
In January 1997, the province announced it would hand over funding responsibility for GO Transit to the Greater Toronto Area municipalities (which consist of Metro Toronto (Now the City of Toronto), and the Regions of Halton, Peel, York, and Durham) and the neighbouring Region of Hamilton-Wentworth (which became the new City of Hamilton on 1 January 2001). In exchange, the province would assume certain other funding responsibilities from municipal governments.

A year later, on 1 January 1998, the GTA municipalities and Hamilton-Wentworth (now the city of Hamilton) began to fund GO Transit, cost-sharing all of GO's capital expenses and any operating costs that are not recovered through passenger fares and other revenue. On 1 January 1999, a new municipal agency created by the province came into being: the Greater Toronto Services Board (GTSB), composed of regional chairs, municipal mayors, and local councillors from the GTSB's service area. GO Transit transferred over to the municipal sector as an arm of the GTSB (Toronto Area Transit Operating Authority) on August 7, 1999, thus completing the process that had begun with the funding change of 1998.

In 2000, all day GO Train service was restored from Burlington to Whitby and finally brought to Oshawa (although weekend & holiday Lakeshore GO Train service was only provided between Pickering and Oakville).

On September 27, 2001, Premier Harris announced that the provincial government would take back responsibility for GO Transit, and put $3 billion into public transit in Ontario.

The GO Transit Act, 2001 was passed by the Ontario Legislature on December 5, 2001. Since January 1, 2002, GO Transit is no longer the responsibility of the municipalities of the Greater Toronto Area and Hamilton. GO has returned to provincial responsibility as a Crown Corporation, and the Greater Toronto Services Board no longer exists.

== Recent developments ==
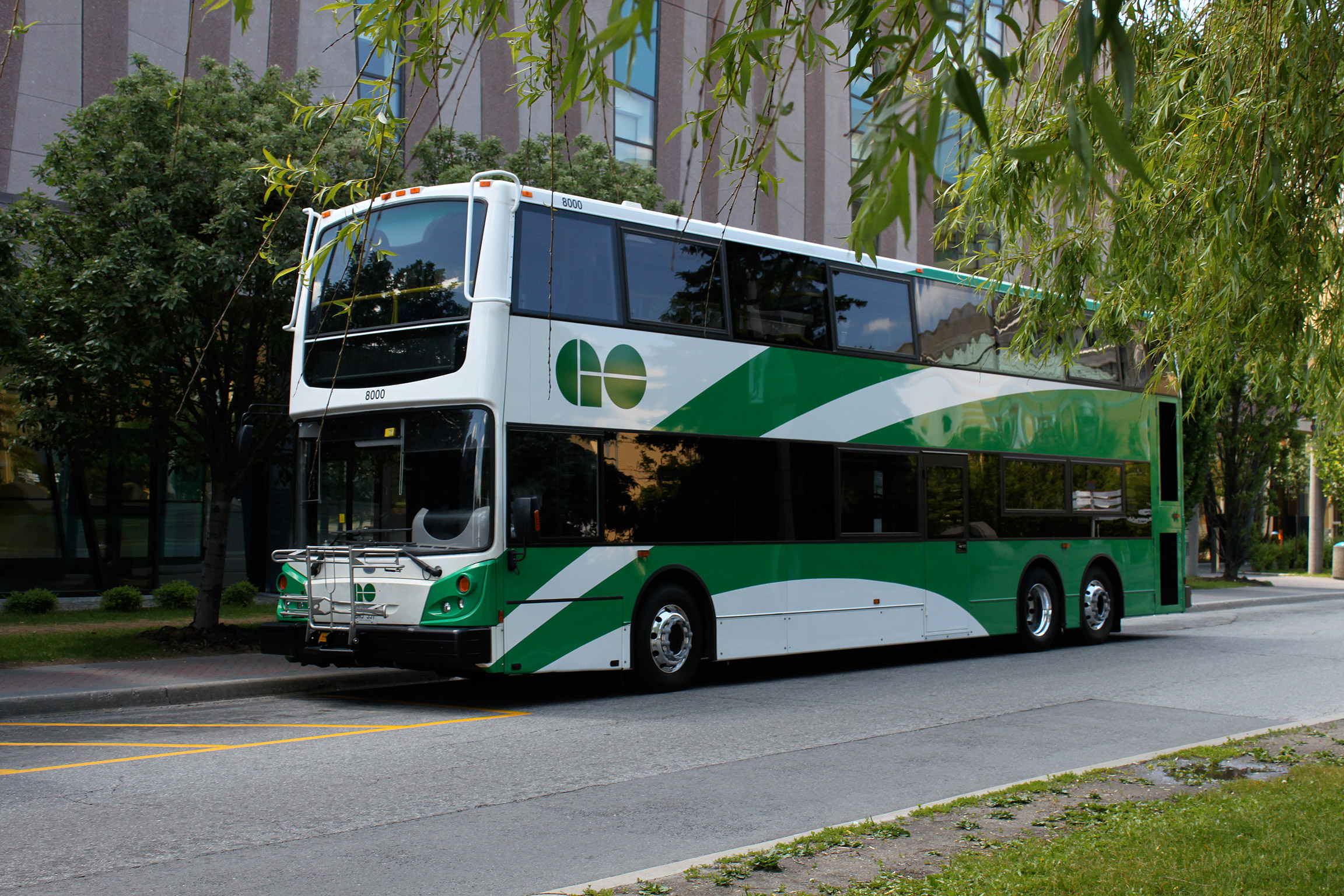
In 2008, GO introduced double-decker buses (still unusual in North America) on routes serving York University.

- December 30, 2006: the GO train service was fully restored along the Lakeshore East line to Oshawa, with service on weekends and holidays.
- September 4, 2007: much of the weekday train service on the Lakeshore West line was extended to Aldershot station, although many rush hour trains continued to originate and terminate at Burlington. A New station on the Milton Line opened at Lisgar. This is the first expansion of the Milton Line since its opening.
- October 28, 2007: GO train service was fully restored along the Lakeshore West line to Aldershot, having service include weekends and holidays.
- Fall of 2007: GO Transit added a new bus service between the University of Guelph and Cooksville, with additional stops at Aberfoyle and Square One. Additionally, the Highway 407 express route serving the Meadowvale and Bramalea GO stations and York University was extended to the University of Guelph. A new park-and-ride facility was also built in Aberfoyle at Brock and McLean roads near the 401, which doubles as a storage facility for GO buses in the Guelph area.
- December 17, 2007: the Bradford line was extended to Barrie South GO Station, restoring GO train service to Barrie for the first time in 15 years.
- April 8, 2008: the first revenue service for 12 car trains began with run 151 on the Milton line. Cab car 248 was in the lead with 605 pushing it by itself. Only two of six trips in both directions are scheduled to be operated with 12 car trains at this time.
- May 2, 2008: all trips on the Milton line were served with 12 car trains for the first time, and this is now permanent.
- June 28, 2008: train-meet service was added between Burlington and Stoney Creek, and between Bronte and Milton GO stations.
- September 2, 2008: train service on the Stouffville line was extended to Lincolnville GO Station. All train-meet service now connects at Lincolnville (rather than at Mount Joy for northbound trips and Stouffville for southbound trips).
- May 14, 2009: with the passage and approval of the 'Greater Toronto and Hamilton Area Transit Implementation Act, 2009', GO Transit was merged with Metrolinx.
- December 19, 2011: train service on the Georgetown line was extended to Kitchener restoring service to Guelph for the first time in over 18 years. The line was soon renamed the Kitchener line.
- January 30, 2012: Barrie Line service was extended to Allandale Waterfront station.
- June 29, 2013: GO transit increased train service on Lakeshore East and Lakeshore West to every 30 minutes, seven days a week. Adding 263 trains.
- September 24, 2018: Frequencies were improved again on both Lakeshore Lines. Trains run every 15 minutes on the Lakeshore East line while trains run every 20 minutes on the Lakeshore West Line.
- June 28, 2021: Bloomington GO was opened.
- January 18, 2022: The Minister of Transportation directed Metrolinx to advance the business case for a new GO rail line from Toronto's Weston GO Station to Bolton in the Town of Caledon, a development supported by the mayors of Caledon, the City of Vaughan, and the City of Brampton. If built, it would be the first entirely new GO rail line to open since 1982.

=== GO TRIP ===
GO TRIP was a jointly-funded plan, with the federal, provincial, and municipal governments contributing to the costs on a one-third/one-third/one-third cost-sharing basis. The majority of federal funding was committed by the then-Liberal federal government through their Canada Strategic Infrastructure Fund. Detailed information on these expansion projects can be found on the GO TRIP website.

GO TRIP's priority was augmenting the capacity and reliability of the existing GO rail network, but not substantively expanding the catchment area or adding new corridors. The majority of spending was allocated to reducing the interface between GO trains and growing volumes of Canadian Pacific Railway (CP) and Canadian National Railway (CN) freight traffic. This included rail-to-rail grade separations where GO's north–south lines cross east–west freight lines: the Snider Diamond, where the Barrie line had crossed the CN York Subdivision, was replaced by an overpass completed in June 2007; the Hagerman Diamond, where the Stouffville line had crossed the same CN line, was replaced by an underpass completed in November 2008. Work at the West Toronto Diamond to take the Georgetown line's tracks under CP's midtown Toronto mainline began in November 2006.

GO TRIP's one substantial extension of rail service involved restoring train trips to the Barrie area, using trackage beyond the then-terminus of Bradford owned by the City of Barrie (who acquired the right of way following CN's abandonment.) A somewhat shorter extension of rail service was made possible by pushing the Stouffville line's passenger terminus several kilometres further northeast of Stouffville proper to the new Lincolnville GO Station, at 10th Line and Bethesda Road in Whitchurch-Stouffville, where an existing layover facility was located. Two new infill stations were built as well: Mount Pleasant Station on the Georgetown line opened in February 2005 and Lisgar Station on the Milton line opened in 2007.

Other capital projects included adding increased track capacity on the CN and CP-owned railway lines so that more GO train trips would be possible. Third tracks were added from Burlington station to Bayview Junction (between Aldershot and Hamilton) on the Lakeshore West line, from Cherry Street in Downtown Toronto to Scarborough station on the Lakeshore East line, and from Mount Pleasant station to Bramalea station on the Georgetown line. A third track between Port Credit station and Kerr Street in Oakville was completed in 2011, giving the Lakeshore West line a minimum of three tracks from Union to Bayview junction in Burlington. A fourth track between Long Branch & Mimico was completed in 2013. Track upgrades on the Milton line to run more peak and off-peak trains were planned, but remain uninitiated. GO TRIP also attempted to curtail GO's need to move "deadheaded" trains back to its main Willowbrook Rail Maintenance Facility in the evening and then out to the termini in the early morning by constructing train layover facilities at the periphery of its rail network. New train layover facilities were built in Milton, Barrie and Hamilton; one proposed for immediately west of Mount Pleasant station is on hold.

In April 2009, it was announced that GO bus service would be extended into the Niagara Region. A station and park-and-ride facility in Grimsby was scheduled to open in June 2009. Further extensions to St. Catharines and Niagara Falls were planned, with service commencing by September 2009. It is expected that GO rail service will eventually be extended into the region. On 14 May 2009 transportation minister Jim Bradley announced that GO Transit would provide weekend and holiday train service from Toronto to Niagara Falls, with four trains per day per direction stopping at St. Catharines, Burlington, Oakville and Port Credit stations en route to Union. GO now runs commuter bus service to Peterborough and expects to run bus service to the Niagara region as well. On October 31, 2009, bus service to the Region of Waterloo commenced, terminating at Square One.

== See also ==
- Public transport in Canada

== Future ==
In 2014, the Ontario Provincial Government unveiled the GO Regional Express Rail project (GO RER) as part of a $15 Billion 10-year transit investment plan for the Greater Toronto and Hamilton area. This includes the electrification of core sections of the Lakeshore East line, Lakeshore West line, and Kitchener line, and the full-length electrification of the Barrie, Stouffville, and Union Pearson Express lines. Frequencies of train service will be increased to every 15 minutes or better on five of the corridors with frequencies as low as every 7.5 minutes on Stouffville and Kitchener. Other improvements include grade separations at key locations, new stations, level-boarding, and reconstruction of existing stations. New electric trains will be procured for RER service throughout the GO network. Once GO RER is complete, GO Transit will increase the number of train trips per week from 1,500 (as of 2015) to 6,000 weekly trips by 2025. The total cost for this plan is $13.5 billion. Electrification was expected to commence in 2022 and new service will be rolled in to phases in 2025–2030. Once complete, the GO RER network will be similar to other networks in Europe such as the Réseau Express Régional in Paris or the Berlin S-Bahn and will complement the existing Toronto Subway network.
