= Etobicoke North =

Etobicoke North may refer to:

- Etobicoke North (federal electoral district), federal riding in Toronto, Ontario, Canada
- Etobicoke North (provincial electoral district), provincial riding in Toronto, Ontario, Canada
- Ward 1 Etobicoke North, municipal ward in Toronto, Ontario, Canada
- Etobicoke North GO Station, GO Transit station in Toronto, Ontario, Canada
