= Brampton GO Station =

Railway station in Ontario, Canada

Brampton
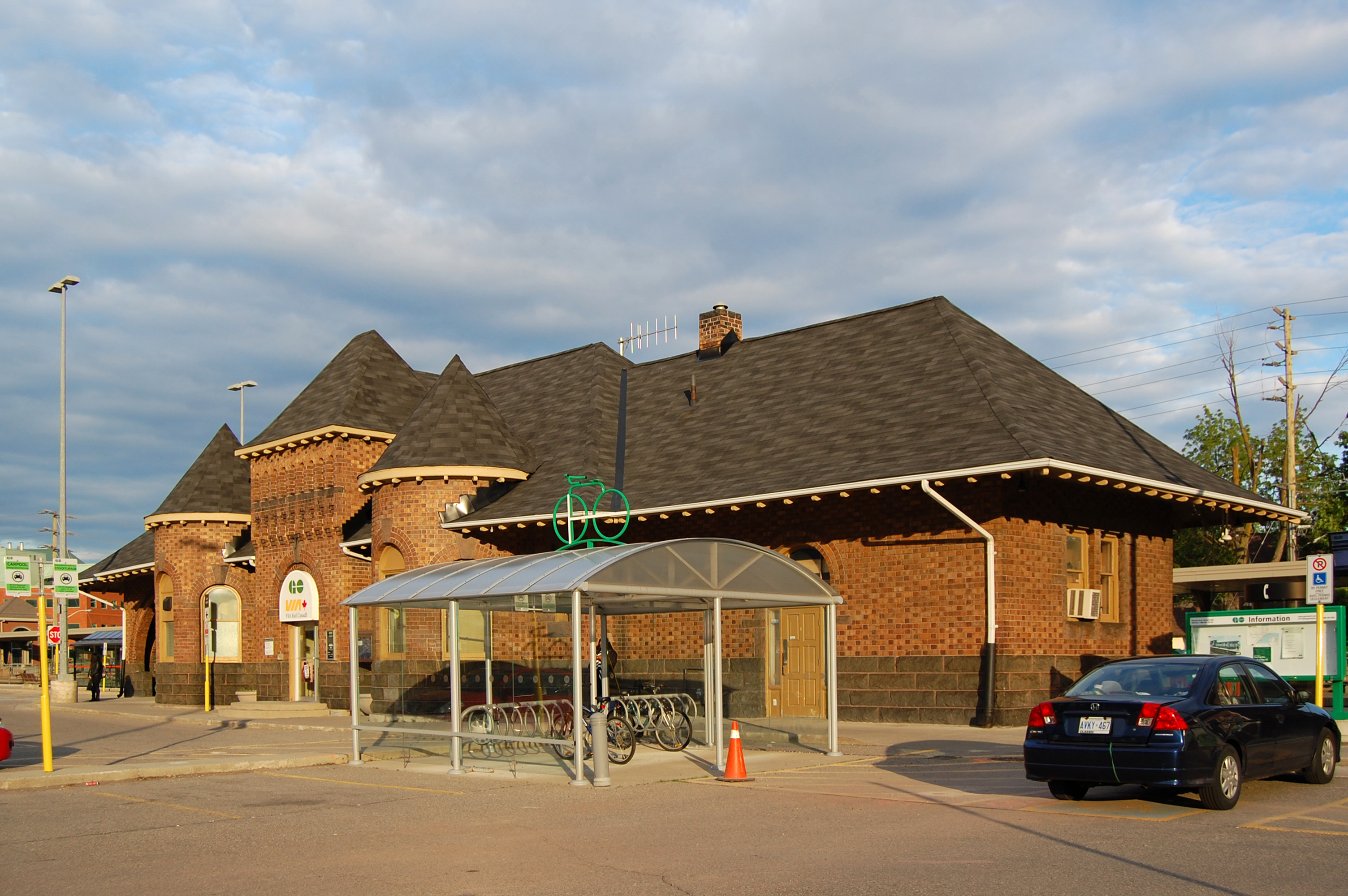
- The historic train station on Church Street

General information
- Other names: Brampton Innovation District GO
- Location: 27 Church Street West; Brampton, Ontario; Canada
- Coordinates: 43°41′13″N 79°45′53″W
- Owner: Metrolinx (station); Canadian National Railway (tracks)
- Lines: Quebec City–Windsor Corridor
- Platforms: 2 side platforms
- Tracks: 2
- Bus routes: 31 33 37
- Connections: Brampton Transit at Brampton Downtown Terminal

Construction
- Structure type: Unstaffed station
- Parking: 962 spaces
- Accessible: Yes

Other information
- Station code: GO Transit: BR; Via Rail: BRMP
- Fare zone: 33

History
- Opened: 1856; 170 years ago
- Rebuilt: 1907; 119 years ago (GTR); 2011; 15 years ago (GO Transit)

Passengers
- 2018: 2,500 (daily avg.) ▲4.9% (GO Transit)

Services
Preceding station	Via Rail	Following station
Georgetown toward Sarnia	Sarnia–Toronto	Toronto Terminus
Preceding station	GO Transit	Following station
Mount Pleasant towards Stratford	Kitchener	Bramalea towards Union
Former services
Preceding station	Amtrak	Following station
Georgetown toward Chicago	International	Malton toward Toronto
Preceding station	Canadian National Railway	Following station
Norval toward Sarnia	Sarnia – Toronto via Lucan Crossing	Malton toward Toronto

Heritage Railway Station (Canada)
- Designated: 1992
- Reference no.: 4567
Location

Brampton station, known as Brampton Innovation District GO Station (French: Gare Brampton Innovation District GO) by GO Transit for sponsorship reasons, is a railway station served by GO Transit and Via Rail, located at 27 Church Street West in downtown Brampton, Ontario, Canada. It is directly connected to the Brampton Downtown Terminal which serves GO Transit and Brampton Transit buses.

== History ==
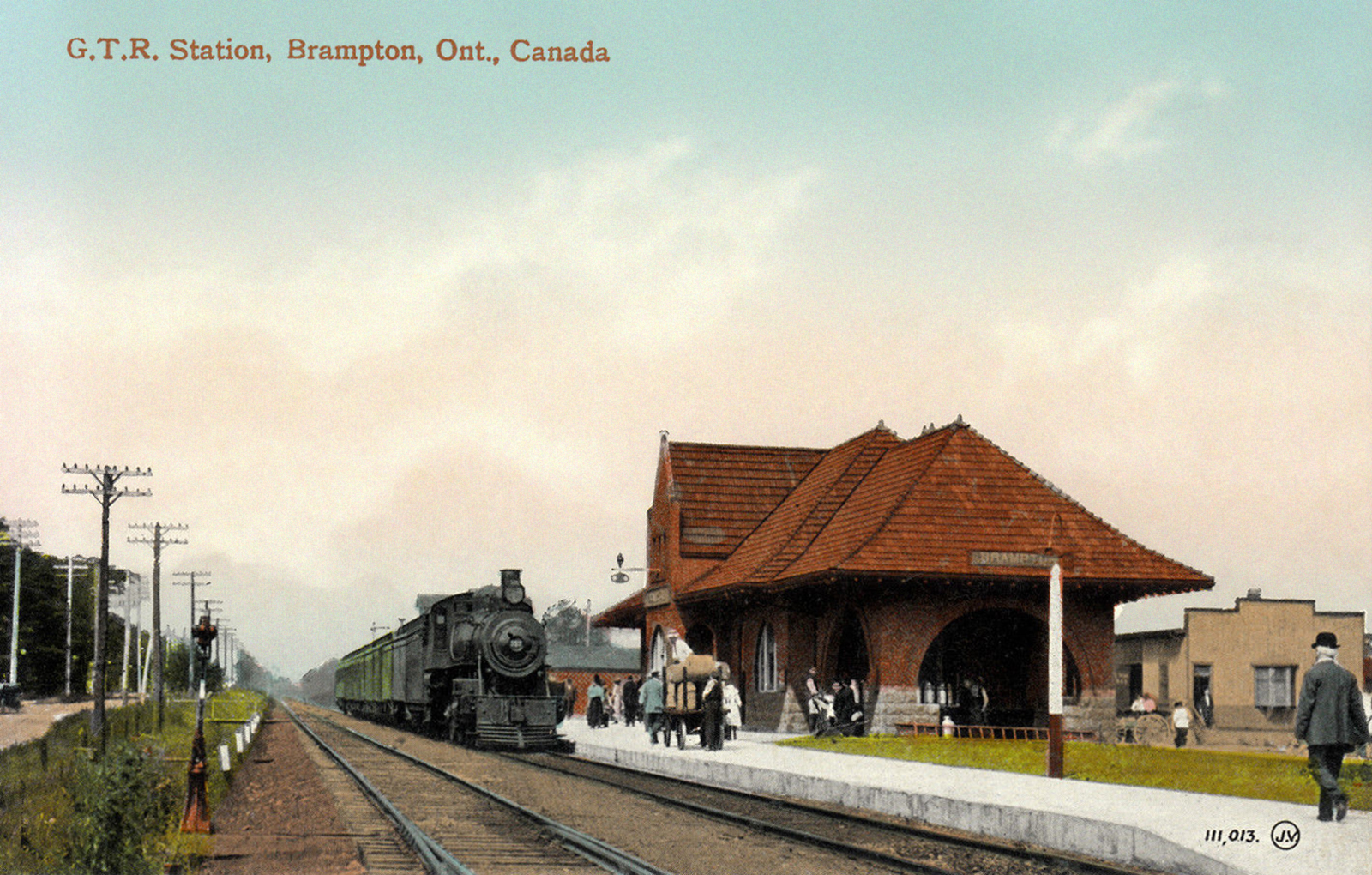
Brampton station circa 1910

Brampton station opened in 1856 as a part of the Grand Trunk Railway (GTR) line between Toronto and London. The current station building was built in 1907.

The GTR was acquired by the Canadian National Railway (CN) in 1923, then in 1977 CN's passenger rail division was transferred to Via Rail.

GO Transit began serving the station in 1974 with the creation of the Georgetown line (now Kitchener Line).

A new second platform on the south side of the tracks was built 2009-2011 featuring a covered section, improved lighting and security systems as well as an automatic snow melting system.

Passengers arriving at the Brampton Innovation District GO station may wish to pay particular attention to whether they are disembarking in the direction of the historic station on Church Street, or the pick-up and drop-off zone on Station Street at George Street North.

Previously, only the north track had been accessible to passenger trains with a tunnel underneath the track for passengers entering from Station Street at George Street North.

In July 2014, Metrolinx (GO Transit) purchased the station from CN for $2.5 million.

In late June 2023, the City of Brampton announced it had entered an agreement with Metrolinx to rename the station Brampton Innovation District GO for 10 years. New signage was expected to be installed in the fourth quarter of 2023.

== Overview ==
The station is wheelchair accessible and the building houses a waiting room and ticket sales. The train station is connected by a passenger tunnel to the Downtown Brampton Bus Terminal on the south side.

With growing commuter ridership, the station's parking lot is operating over its designed capacity, and cannot be extended because of its downtown location. Mount Pleasant GO Station opened in early 2005 to take some of the pressure off this station.

The trackage between Bramalea and Georgetown is still owned by Canadian National and it is part of the railway's primary freight line across Ontario. This limits the number of passenger trains that can operate through Brampton.

== Services ==
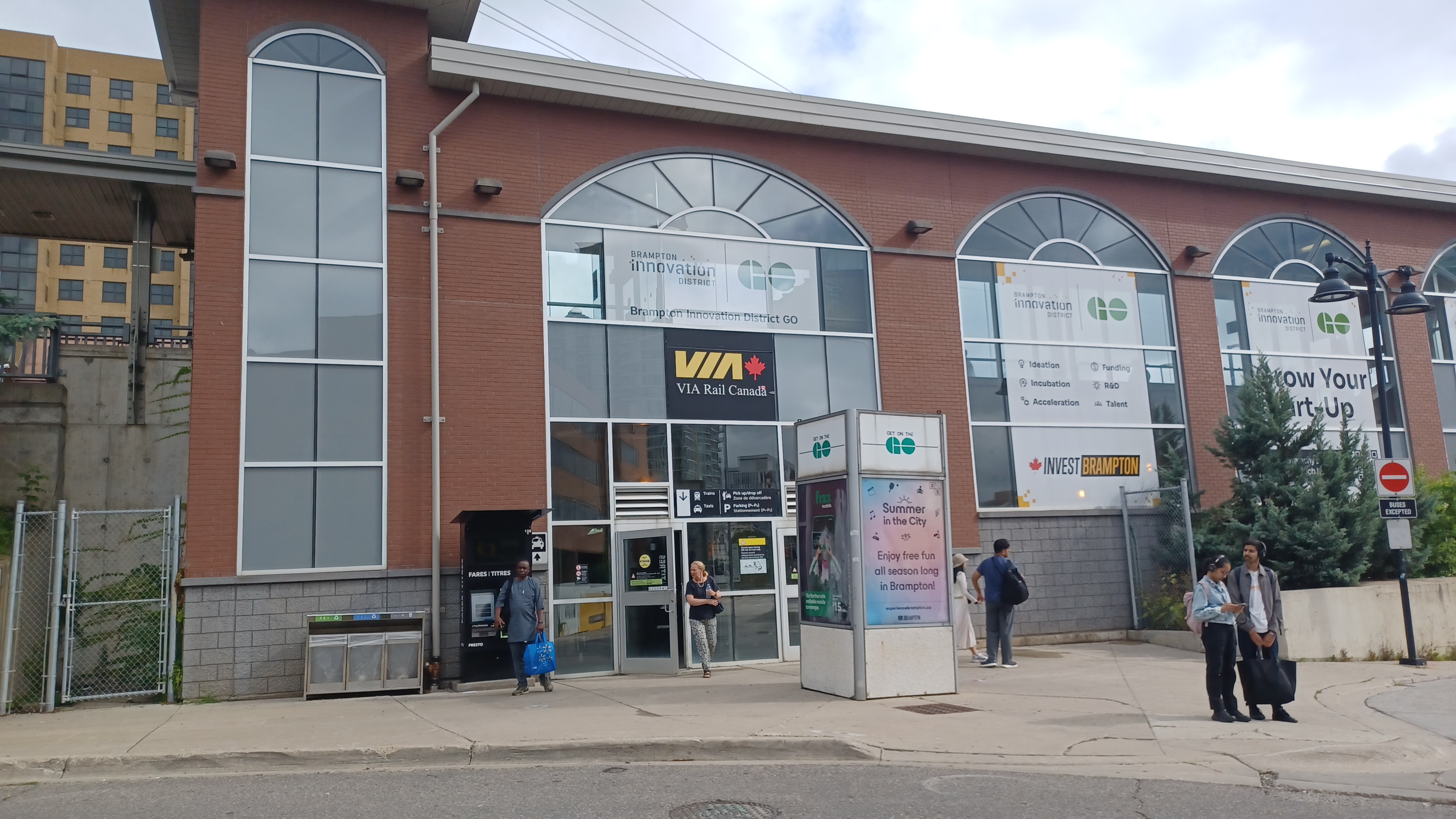
The GO Train Pick up/Drop off Zone on Station Street in downtown Brampton, Ontario.

The GO Transit Kitchener line trains operate between Toronto Union Station and Kitchener, with many trips terminating in Mount Pleasant or Georgetown. As of April 8, 2023, train service operates on weekdays and weekends with up to 3 trains per hour in the peak direction on weekdays, and one train per hour on weekday off-peak periods and weekends. Weekend service to the station first began on April 8, 2023.

Via Rail Corridor intercity trains operate west to Stratford, London, and Sarnia, and east to Toronto Union Station.

Between 1982 and 2004, Brampton was an intermediate stop on the International Limited, a joint Via Rail and Amtrak service between Chicago and Toronto.

The Downtown Brampton Terminal serves GO buses to Yorkdale, York Mills and Union stations in Toronto, Orangeville and Guelph, as well as Brampton Transit local buses.

== See also ==
- List of designated heritage railway stations of Canada
