= Malton GO Station =

Railway station in Mississauga, Ontario, Canada

Malton
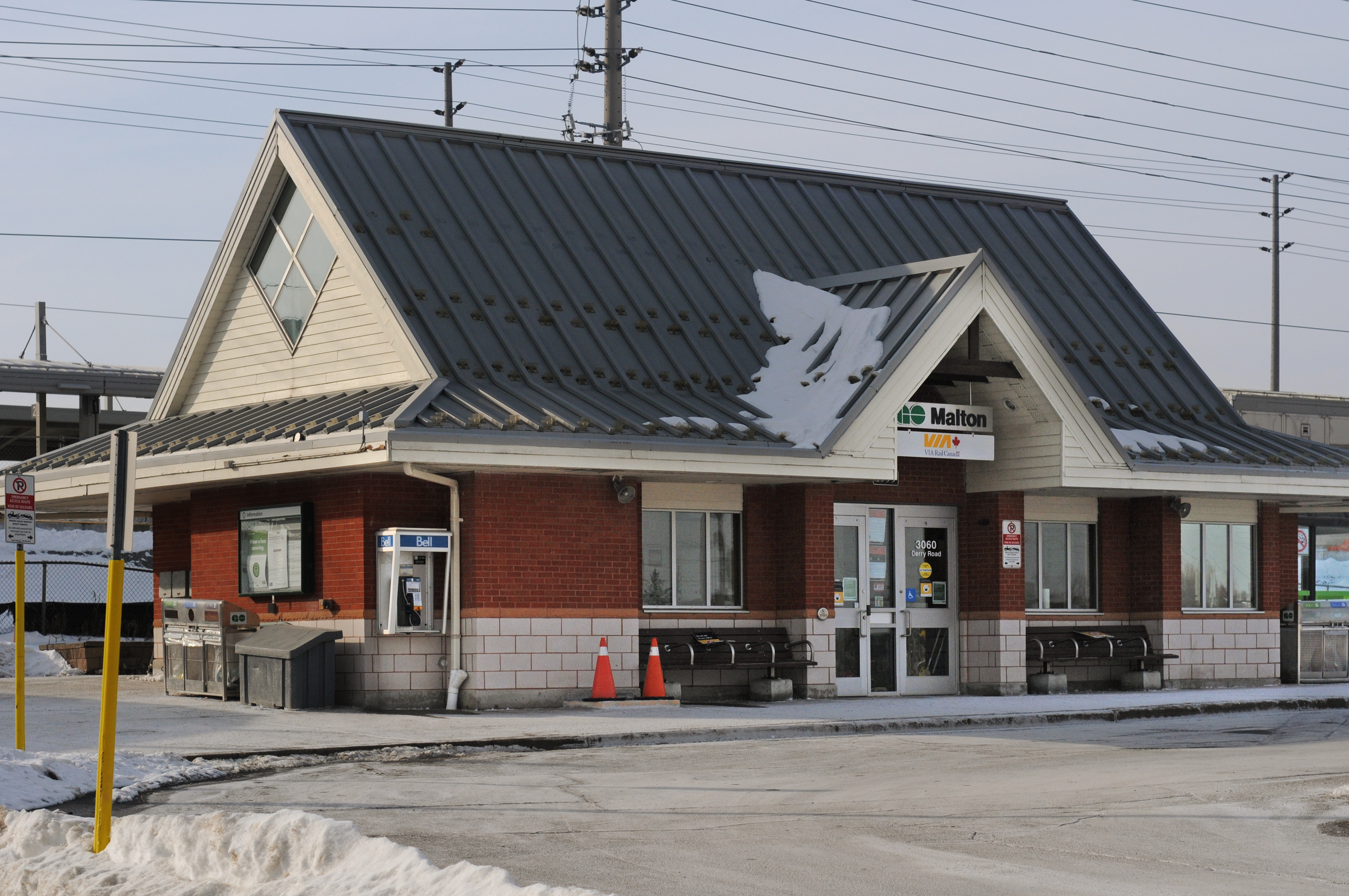

General information
- Location: 3060 Derry Road; Mississauga, Ontario; Canada
- Coordinates: 43°42′18″N 79°38′19″W
- Owner: Metrolinx
- Platforms: 1 side platform, 1 island platform
- Tracks: 3
- Bus routes: 31 38
- Connections: Brampton Transit; MiWay; Transhelp

Construction
- Structure type: Shelter
- Parking: 525 spaces
- Accessible: yes

Other information
- Station code: GO Transit: MA
- Fare zone: 31

History
- Opened: 1974; 52 years ago
- Rebuilt: 2014; 12 years ago

Passengers
- 2018: 1200 (daily avg.) ▲1.1% (GO Transit)

Services
Preceding station	GO Transit	Following station
Bramalea towards Stratford	Kitchener	Etobicoke North towards Union
Future services
Preceding station	GO Transit	Following station
Bramalea towards Stratford	Kitchener	Woodbine towards Union
Former services
Preceding station	Via Rail	Following station
Brampton toward Sarnia	Sarnia–Toronto	Toronto Terminus
Preceding station	Amtrak	Following station
Brampton toward Chicago	International	Toronto Terminus
Preceding station	Canadian National Railway	Following station
Brampton toward Sarnia	Sarnia – Toronto via Lucan Crossing	Magor toward Toronto
Location

Malton GO Station is a train and bus station on GO Transit's Kitchener line, located near Toronto Pearson International Airport in the community of Malton in Mississauga, Ontario, Canada. Until 2026, it was also served by Via Rail trains operating between Toronto, London and Sarnia.

== History ==
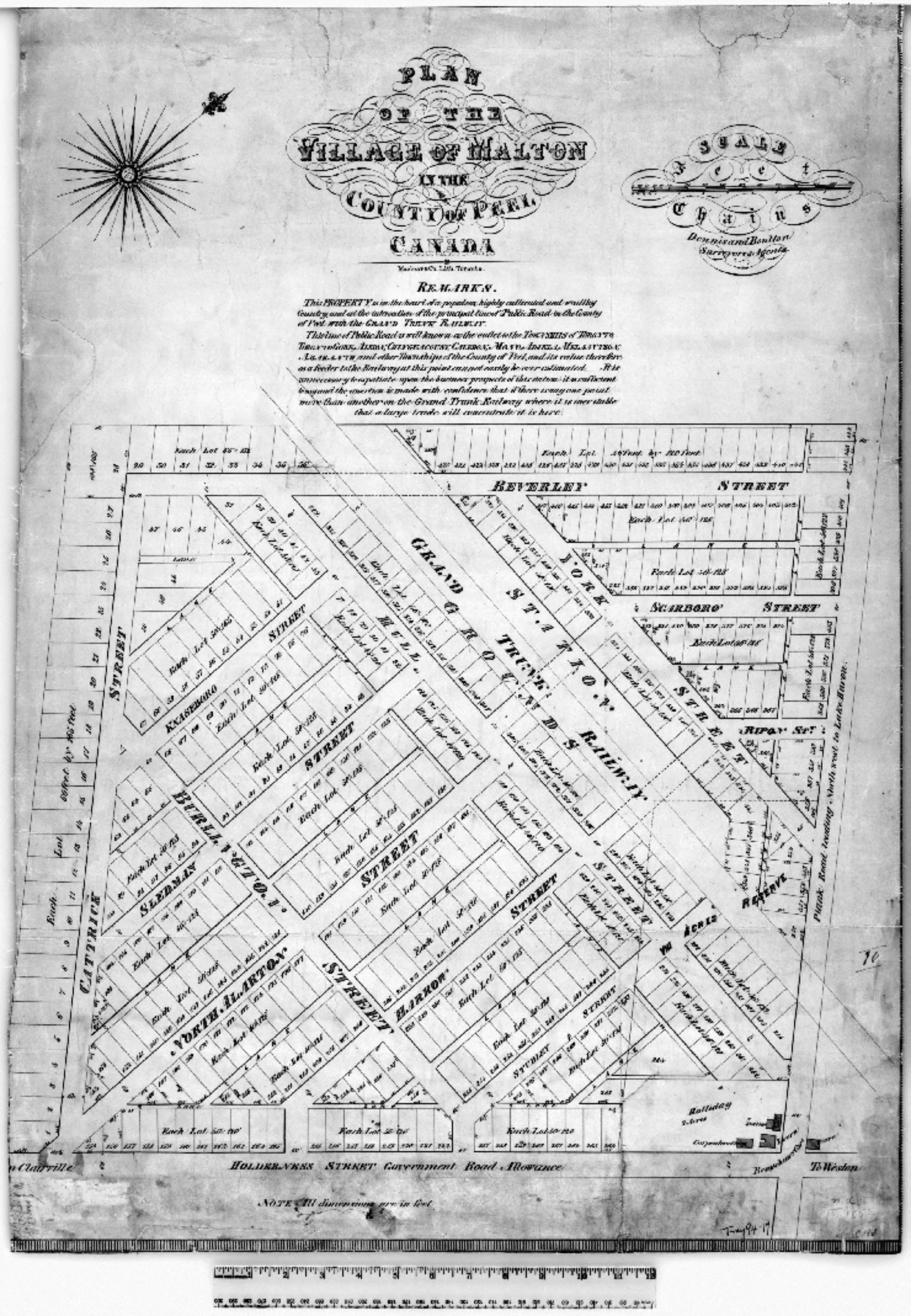
Village of Malton plan showing GTR station location

The original site of Malton railway station was approximately 0.8 km (0.5 mi) west of the current GO Transit facility, where Scarboro Street crosses the tracks. The first station was a wood-frame structure built in 1856 by the Grand Trunk Railway (GTR), which was superseded by a second frame building in 1912. Ownership of the station was transferred to Canadian National Railway in 1920 when it acquired the GTR, and CN demolished the station in 1973.

GO Transit constructed a new station building and platforms south of Derry Road and east of Airport Road for the introduction of GO Train service in 1974.

The International Limited was operated jointly by Via Rail and Amtrak between Chicago and Toronto. The service operated from 1982 to 2004.

Metrolinx, the parent agency of GO Transit, purchased the 25 km (15.5 mi) Weston Subdivision from Canadian National Railway in 2009, including the section through Malton. CN retained rights to serve freight customers along the line, while Via Rail continued to operate passenger trains.

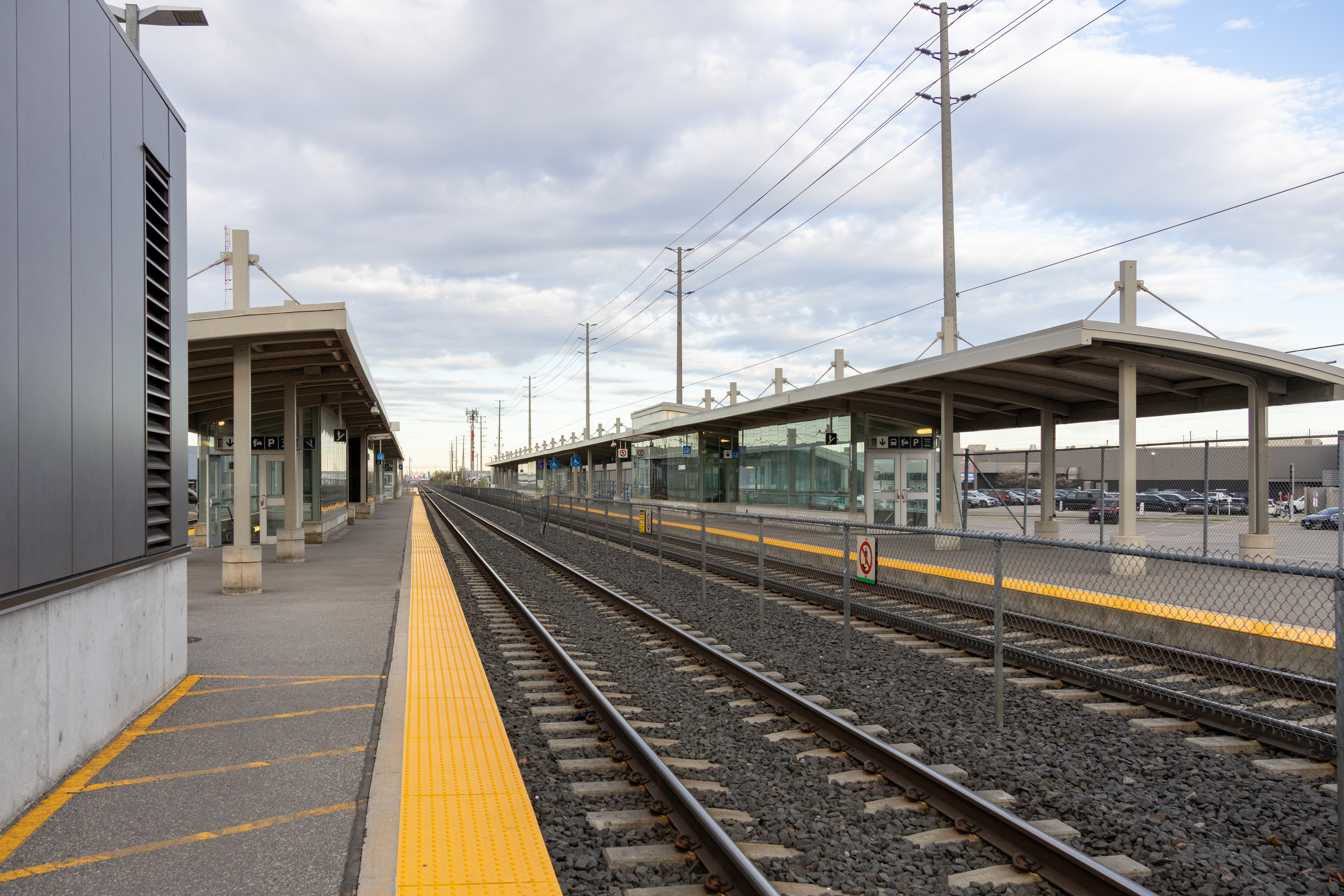
Station platforms in 2026

Station renovations included new walkways and a pedestrian tunnel providing access to new platforms, which have canopies rather than shelters, as well as an expanded parking lot. The previous brick station building was replaced by a new structure offering improved passenger facilities. The addition of elevators made the station fully accessible.

=== Discontinuation of Via Rail service ===
On September 16, 2026, Via Rail announced that it would cease serving Malton effective October 25. Guildwood station in Scarborough was also set to be removed from Via Rail's schedule as part of the changes, but that decision was later reversed.

Via Rail said that eliminating the stops would improve overall travel times, citing the stations' proximity to Union Station and the availability of GO Transit and other transportation services.

== Bus connections ==
- 31 Guelph - Georgetown - Brampton - Toronto GO Bus intermediate stops between Guelph Central Station, Georgetown GO Station, Brampton GO Station and Union Station Bus Terminal
- 38 Bolton GO Bus to Bolton
- 30 Rexdale (MiWay)

The local MiWay bus routes do not enter the station bus loop and can be boarded a short distance away on Derry Road. These consist of routes 18 and 42.

Local Brampton Transit buses also do not enter the station bus loop and can be boarded a short distance away on Derry Road, which is served by route 14/14A.
