= Woodbine GO Station =

Railway station under construction in Ontario, Canada

Woodbine

General information
- Location: Hwy 27 & Grandstand Entrance Rd; Toronto, Ontario; Canada
- Coordinates: 43.70619°N 79.59442°W
- Owner: Metrolinx
- Platforms: Island platforms
- Tracks: 3 (to be expanded to 4)
- Connections: TTC buses

Construction
- Parking: Yes
- Accessible: Yes

History
- Opening: TBA

Services
Preceding station	GO Transit	Following station
Malton towards Stratford	Kitchener Planned expansion	Weston towards Union
Preceding station	Metrolinx	Following station
Pearson Airport Terminus	Union Pearson Express	Weston toward Union
Location

Woodbine GO Station (also referred to as Highway 27–Woodbine) is an under construction commuter train station in Toronto, Ontario, Canada. It will be an infill station on GO Transit's Kitchener line and the Union Pearson Express in Etobicoke, adjacent to Woodbine Racetrack. The station will be located between Malton GO and Weston GO and will replace Etobicoke North GO Station upon opening.

== History ==
=== Planning ===
The station originated in the GO Expansion program's search for new station sites, and in the planned closure of Etobicoke North station. The existing station's platforms would be displaced by additional tracks built as part of the expansion of the rail tunnel under Highway 401 and Highway 409, and no alternative configuration at that site was found feasible. In June 2016, the Metrolinx board directed staff to study a replacement station near Highway 27. A site at 50 Resources Road, east of Islington Avenue, was also examined but rejected because of a restrictive covenant on the land, limited development potential and poor connectivity.

An initial business case, completed in November 2018, compared closing Etobicoke North without replacement against building a new station at Highway 27—Woodbine. It forecast 14,700 daily boardings and alightings at the new station in 2031, with a benefit-cost ratio of 2.1 to 3.3 and capital costs estimated at $92-117 million (2017 dollars). Much of the forecast ridership was tied to Humber College, about 3.5 km north along Highway 27; roughly three-quarters of morning peak alightings were projected to be destined there. The base case assumed service by Kitchener line GO trains only, with an UP Express stop studied as an option requiring an additional island platform.

=== Announcement and construction ===
The station was announced on March 6, 2019, at an event at Woodbine Racetrack, as a partnership between the Government of Ontario, Metrolinx and Woodbine Entertainment Group. Under Metrolinx's transit-oriented development approach, Woodbine Entertainment committed to paying the station's construction costs. Metrolinx CEO Phil Verster projected at the time that the station would be used by nearly 15,000 a day.

Early works, including overhead utility removal, site clearing and grading, began in February 2025, and the start of station construction was announced in June 2025. Sewer, utility and Grandstand Entrance Road realignment work followed in summer 2025. Over the weekend of April 17-20, 2026, Kitchener line service was suspended while the tracks were realigned onto a temporary diversion. A second weekend shutdown on May 15-19, 2026, allowed crews to remove track ballast and install a temporary pedestrian bridge to support platform construction. Temporary access bridges were in place by July 2026, and platform construction began in August 2026. The scheduled completion date has not been announced.

== Station design ==
The station will have a station building, island platforms serving both GO and UP Express trains, east and west pedestrian bridges, dedicated GO parking, a bus loop with a passenger waiting area, a passenger pick-up and drop-off area, and a multi-use path with road, bicycle and sidewalk access. It will be fully accessible. The platforms will include a snow-melt system.

The site lies just east of the Wice control location, where the UP Express spur to Pearson Airport diverges from the Kitchener corridor. Once the new station opens, Etobicoke North station will be demolished to make room for a fourth main track and signal upgrades.

== Connections and surroundings ==
The bus loop will connect to TTC, MiWay, York Region Transit and Brampton Transit routes. Besides Woodbine Racetrack, the station will serve Humber Polytechnic's North Campus, Woodbine Mall and Etobicoke General Hospital. Metrolinx expects the station to serve up to 7,000 daily riders by 2051, with trains as often as every 15 minutes during rush hours. According to Woodbine Entertainment, the station will support a redevelopment of the lands around the racetrack including more than 20,000 new homes.

=== Transit-oriented community ===
The station is located at the southeast corner of the Woodbine lands at 555 Rexdale Boulevard, Highway 27, the rail corridor and Highway 427. Under the 2023 Toronto-Ontario "New Deal" agreement, the City of Toronto and the provincial government agreed to advance a mixed-use transit-oriented community around the future station and to prioritize its planning approvals. The Minister of Municipal Affairs and Housing subsequently approved Official Plan Amendment 653 with modifications, re-designating the southeast quadrant of the Woodbine lands from employment lands to "Mixed Use Areas" and "Regeneration Areas". The City began a secondary plan study for the area in November 2025, in cooperation with landowner Woodbine Entertainment Group, with completion targeted within 18 months. Residential uses on the "Regeneration Areas" lands are not permitted until the secondary plan is adopted.
