= Weston GO Station =

Railway station in Toronto, Ontario, Canada

Weston
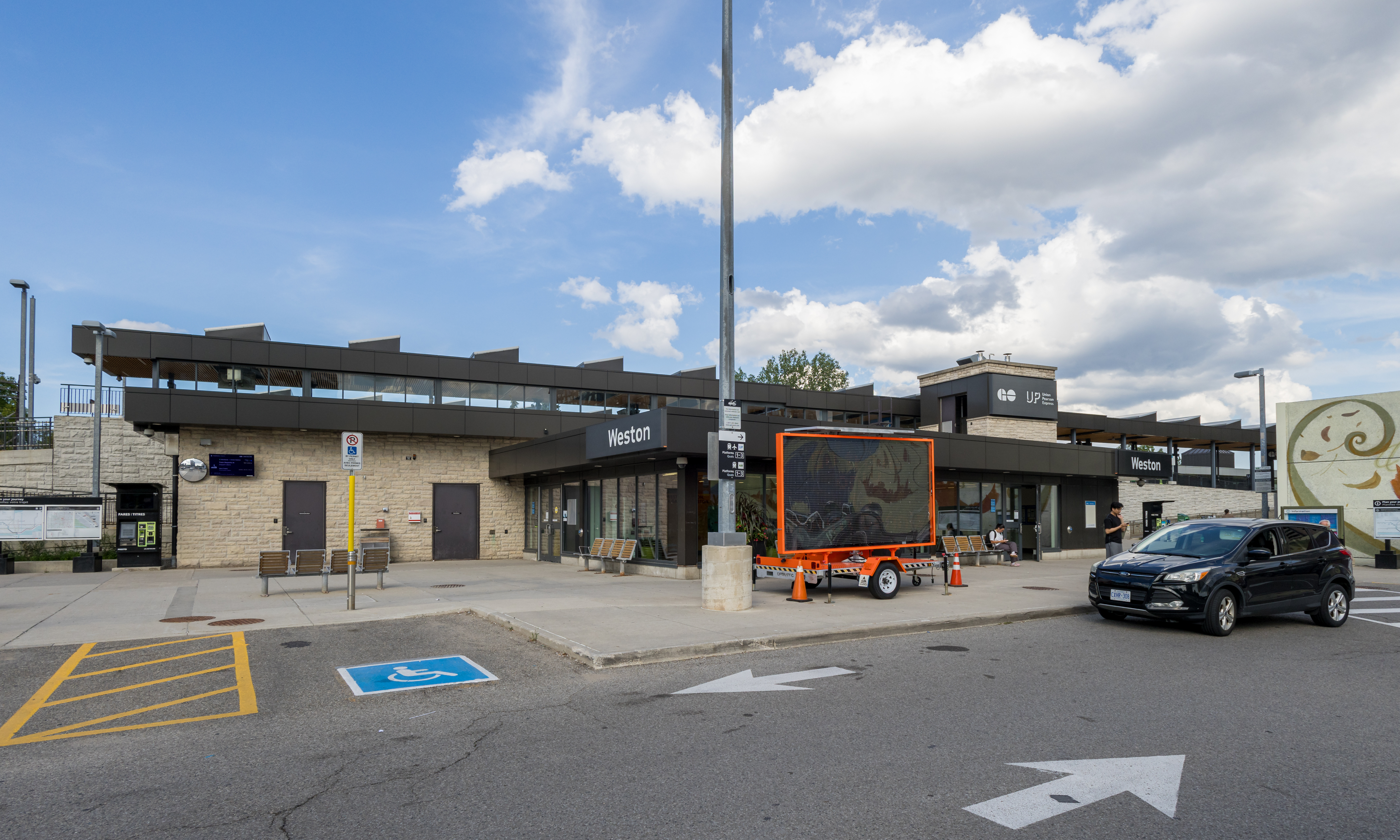
- Exterior of the station

General information
- Location: 1865 Weston Road; Toronto, Ontario
- Coordinates: 43°42′02″N 79°30′50″W
- Owner: Metrolinx
- Platforms: 2 side and 1 island platform
- Tracks: 4
- Connections: TTC buses

Construction
- Parking: 144
- Accessible: Yes

Other information
- Station code: GO Transit: WE
- Fare zone: 04

History
- Opened: 1974; 52 years ago
- Rebuilt: 2015

Passengers
- 2018: 1200 (daily avg.) ▲23.2% (GO Transit)

Services
| Preceding station | GO Transit | Following station |
|---|---|---|
| Etobicoke North towards Stratford | Kitchener | Mount Dennis towards Union |
| Preceding station | Metrolinx | Following station |
| Pearson Airport Terminus | Union Pearson Express | Mount Dennis toward Union |
Future services
| Preceding station | GO Transit | Following station |
|---|---|---|
| Woodbine towards Stratford | Kitchener | Mount Dennis towards Union |
| Preceding station | Metrolinx | Following station |
| Woodbine toward Pearson Airport | Union Pearson Express | Mount Dennis toward Union |
Former services at CN/CP stations
| Preceding station | Canadian National Railway | Following station |
|---|---|---|
| Magor toward Sarnia | Sarnia – Toronto via Lucan Crossing | West Toronto toward Toronto |
| Preceding station | Canadian Pacific Railway | Following station |
| Emery toward Sudbury | Sudbury – Toronto | West Toronto toward Toronto |
Location

Weston GO Station is a railway station in Toronto, Ontario, serving the GO Transit Kitchener line and the Union Pearson Express. It is located on the south side of Lawrence Avenue West, just east of Weston Road, in the neighbourhood of Weston.

== Overview ==
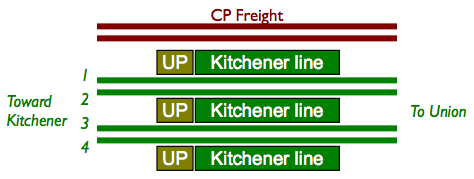
Track and platform configuration

Weston station consists of four tracks served by two side and one island platform. Each platform has two sections: UP Express trains stop at high-level platforms at the north end of the station, while Kitchener Line trains stop at low-level platforms at the south end of the station. In addition to the Metrolinx-owned passenger rail tracks, the double-tracked Canadian Pacific Kansas City MacTier Subdivision passes along the east side of the station.

The station is fully accessible, with pedestrian entrances from Weston Road and Lawrence Avenue and a pedestrian bridge across Lawrence Avenue. The station includes a kiss and ride passenger drop off area, and has a parking capacity for 220 cars.

== History ==
=== Early stations ===
The first stations at this location were the Weston stations of the Canadian National Railway (CNR) and Canadian Pacific Railway (CPR).

==== GTR Weston / CNR Weston ====
The CNR station was built south of John Street in 1856 by the Grand Trunk Railway (GTR), which was absorbed by the CNR in 1923.

==== CPR Weston ====
The Toronto, Grey and Bruce Railway (TG&B) went into service in 1871 on narrow gauge rail, which was converted to standard gauge track by 1881, and became part of the CPR in 1883. The CPR station was located on the north side of John Street west of Rosemount Avenue, and was constructed circa 1900 replacing an earlier TG&B structure. The station last saw passenger service in 1957, and was subsequently used as an order office until its demolition in 1973.

==== Legacy ====
A Tim Hortons store on the south side of Lawrence Avenue West, east of the tracks, pays homage to the old stations with a replica "Weston" station sign on the roof.

=== First GO Station ===
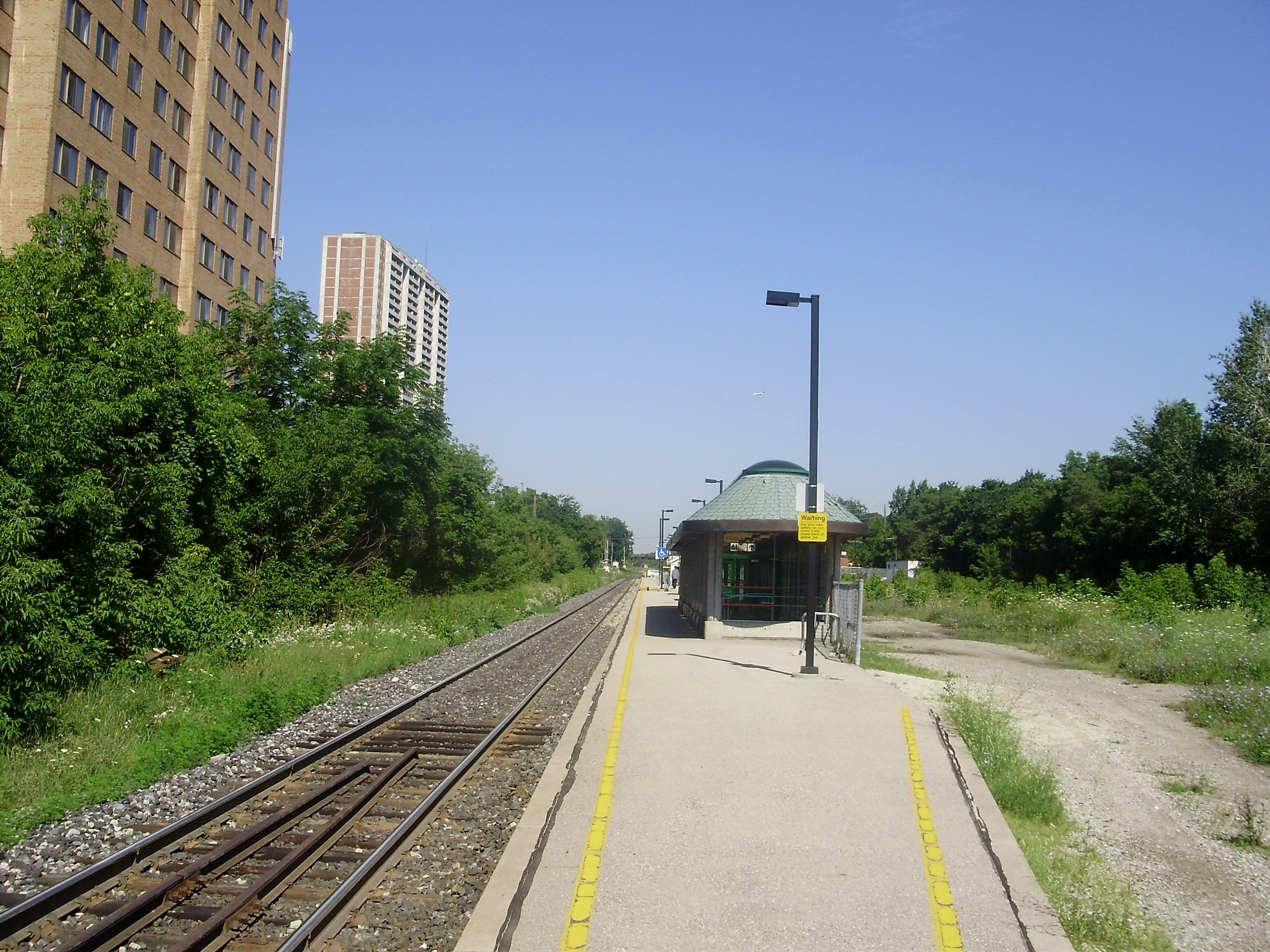
Original GO platform in 2008

The first Weston GO Station opened in 1974 and stretched north from Lawrence Avenue to John Street. It consisted of a single track and platform accessed via a staircase and entrance from a headhouse on Lawrence Avenue west of the railway overpass. The station was demolished in October 2013 following the opening of the temporary GO platform.

A temporary platform was opened on July 23, 2013 on the south side of Lawrence Avenue and in use until 2014 during construction of the new station. Ticket sales were moved to a temporary trailer until the new station was open. This was part of the Georgetown South railway improvement project, which included eliminating all level crossings of the Kitchener Line in the City of Toronto. The original GO station on the north side of Lawrence Avenue was demolished in late 2013 in order to construct a ramp into the new tunnel under the Weston area and allow for the pedestrian bridge construction over Lawrence Avenue.

=== Current GO Station ===
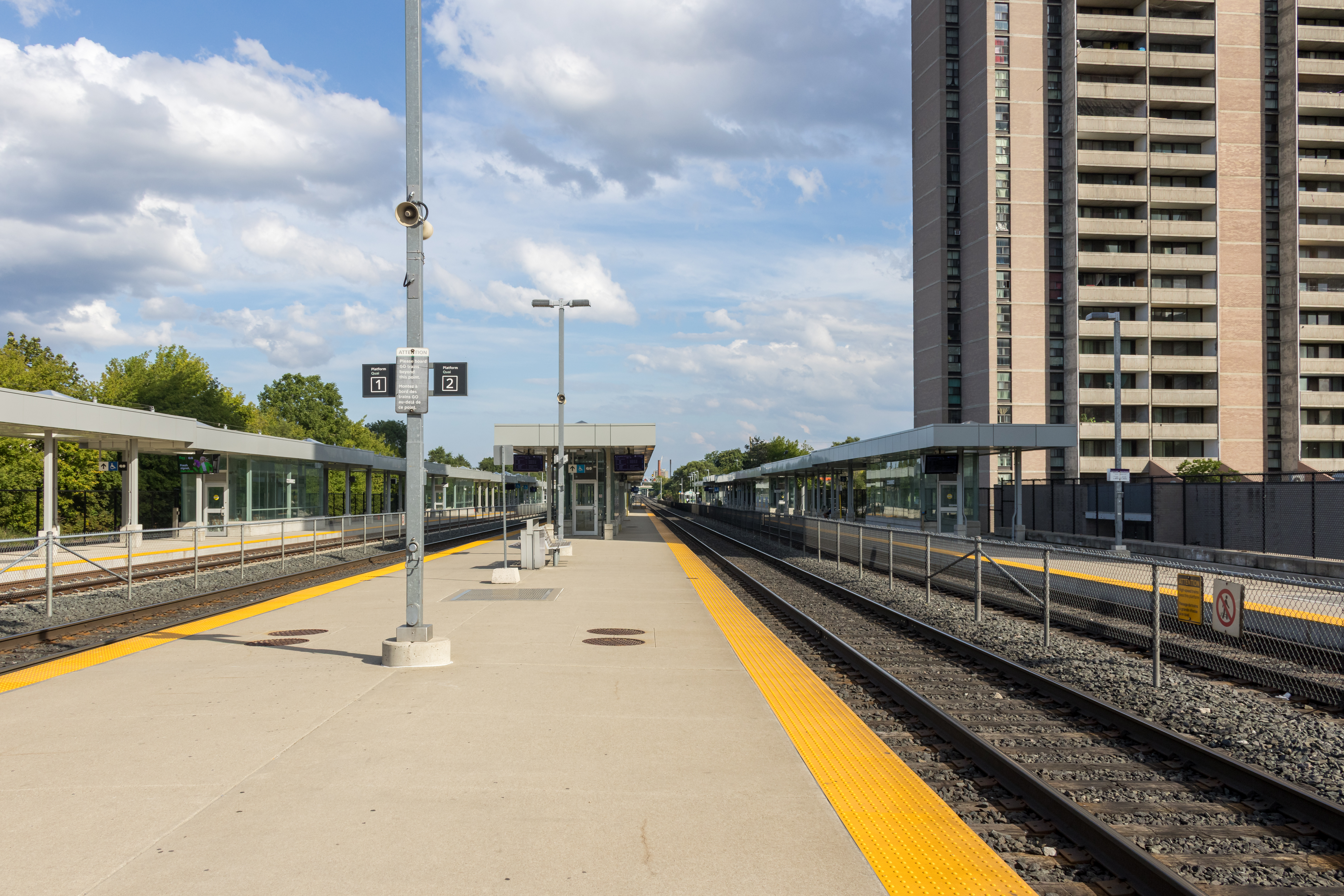
Upgraded and expanded GO platforms

As part of the Union Pearson Express project and Georgetown South expansion, construction on a new station commenced in August 2013. Completed in 2015, new station features many improvements over the previous station, such as more parking, more platforms, more tracks, heated shelters, enclosed entrances and space for future retail. The station building opened in June 2015 and parking facilities were completed by end of 2015. A new pedestrian bridge opened in late October 2016 providing a means to cross Lawrence Avenue without having to walk over to either Weston Road or Ralph Street.

The initial plan for the airport rail link service to Pearson International Airport, Blue22, did not include a stop at Weston station. However, in 2005, area residents campaigned for a stop on the service in 2005 as compensation for the negative impacts of the railway expansion. Following the takeover of the project by Metrolinx, Weston became a stop on the planned service. As a result, Weston has been a stop on the Union Pearson Express since the service began operation in June 2015. UPX president Kathy Haley said that ten per cent of UPX riders are expected to board at Weston GO Station.

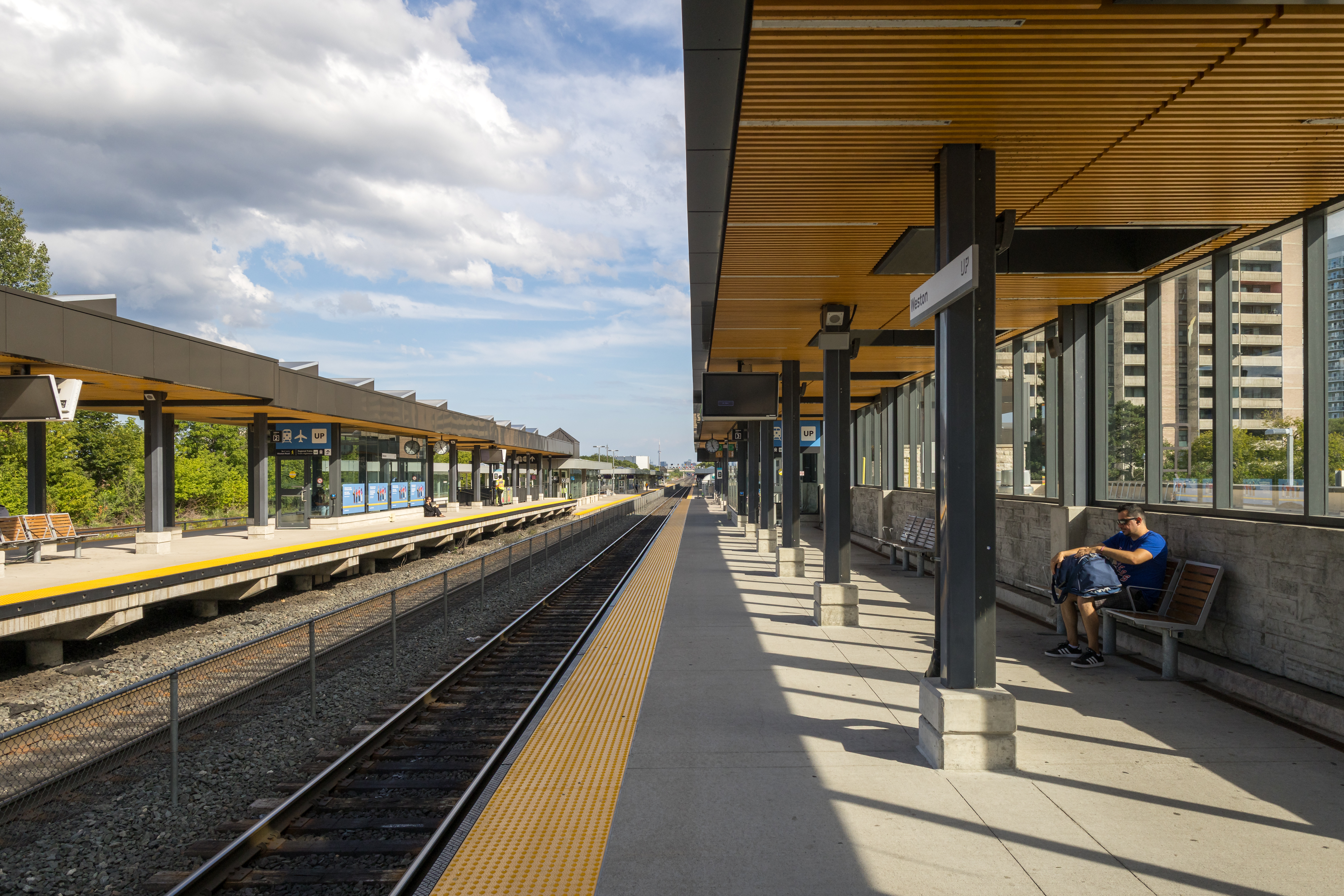
UP Express platforms

Further station enhancements were begun in 2019, and were completed in 2024, including a fourth track and platform plus more customer parking.

== Connections ==
There are no bus stops beside the station, but a short distance west at the intersection of Lawrence Avenue West and Weston Road, connections can be made to Toronto Transit Commission bus routes 52 Lawrence West, 79 Scarlett Road, 89 Weston, 952 Lawrence West Express and 989 Weston Express.
