= Kitchener station =

Railway station in Kitchener, Ontario, Canada

Kitchener
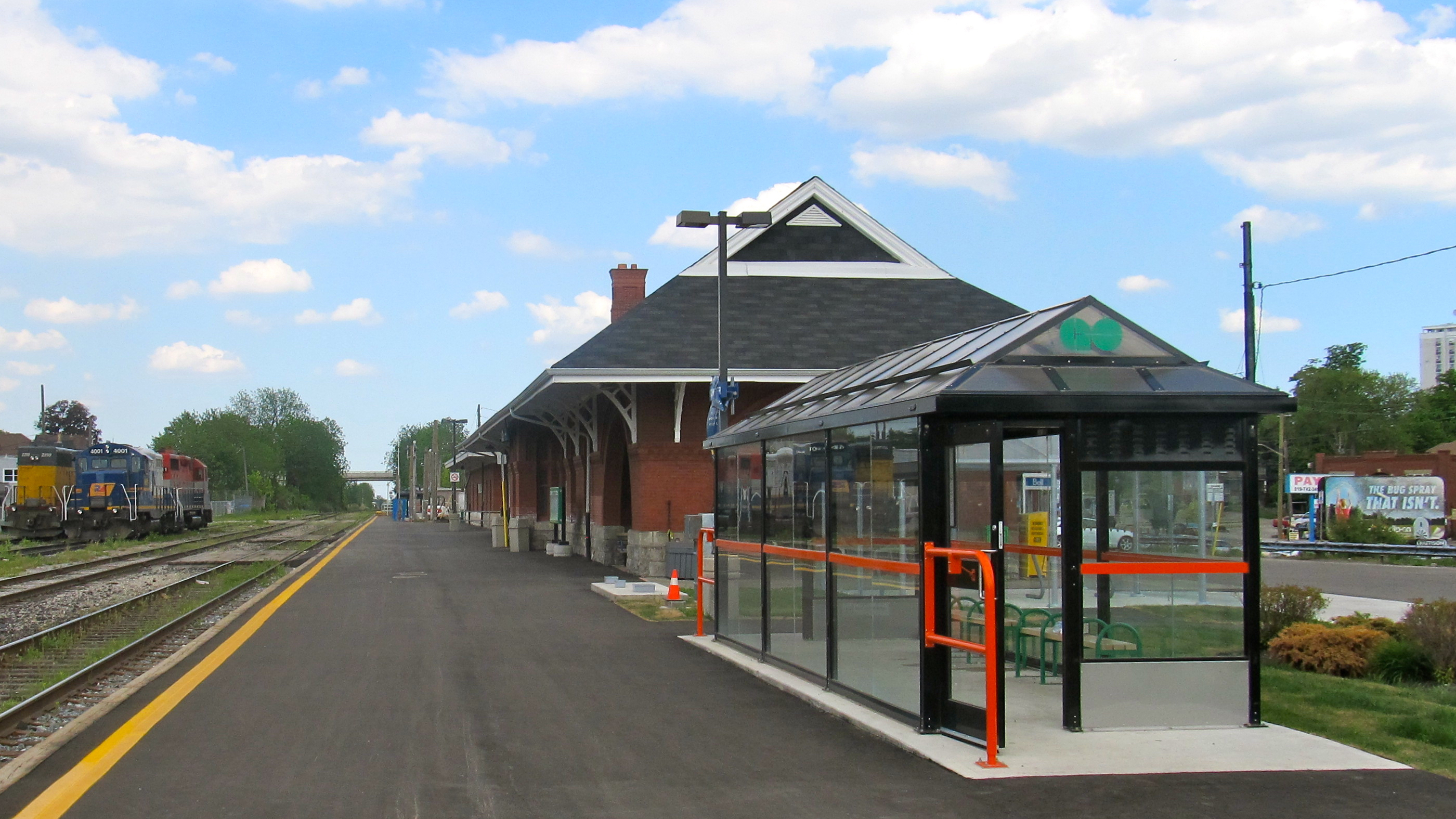

General information
- Location: 126 Weber St. West; Kitchener, Ontario; Canada
- Coordinates: 43°27′20″N 80°29′35″W
- Owner: Via Rail
- Platforms: 1 side platform
- Tracks: 2
- Bus operators: GO Transit; Grand River Transit
- Connections: 17B 30 30A GRT buses: 204 iXpress Highland–Victoria; 6 Bridge–Courtland; 8 Weber; 20 Victoria–Frederick; 34 Bingemans; Spurline Trail

Construction
- Structure type: Staffed station; Heritage station building
- Parking: Central Systems Auto Parks
- Cycle facilities: Outdoor sheltered bicycle storage
- Accessible: Yes

Other information
- Station code: GO Transit: KI
- Fare zone: 27

History
- Opened: 1856; 170 years ago
- Rebuilt: 1897; 129 years ago
- Former names: Berlin (1856–1916)

Key dates
- 1966: Clock tower removed by CN
- 2011: GO Train service begins

Services
Preceding station	Via Rail	Following station
Stratford toward Sarnia	Sarnia–Toronto	Guelph toward Toronto
Preceding station	GO Transit	Following station
Stratford Terminus	Kitchener	Guelph Central towards Union
Former services
Preceding station	GO Transit	Following station
Stratford towards London	Kitchener (express, 2021-2023)	Guelph towards Union
Preceding station	Amtrak	Following station
Stratford toward Chicago	International	Guelph toward Toronto
Preceding station	Canadian National Railway	Following station
Petersburg toward Sarnia	Sarnia – Toronto via Lucan Crossing	Breslau toward Toronto
Waterloo toward Elmira	Elmira – Galt	German Mills toward Galt (West)

Heritage Railway Station (Canada)
- Designated: 2006
- Reference no.: 4571
Location

Kitchener station is a railway station located in Kitchener, Ontario, Canada, slightly to the northeast of downtown Kitchener, at 126 Weber Street West, near the corner of Victoria Street. It is a heritage building containing a waiting room and ticket counter built beside a set of tracks also used as a freight yard. A separate building to the east of the passenger area, originally built in 1925 as a freight building, now serves as the headquarters for the Goderich–Exeter Railway.

The station is served by GO Transit regional trains operating between Kitchener and Toronto, serving as its terminus station, Via Rail intercity trains operating between Sarnia and Toronto via London, and GO Transit regional buses operating between Kitchener and Bramalea.

== History ==
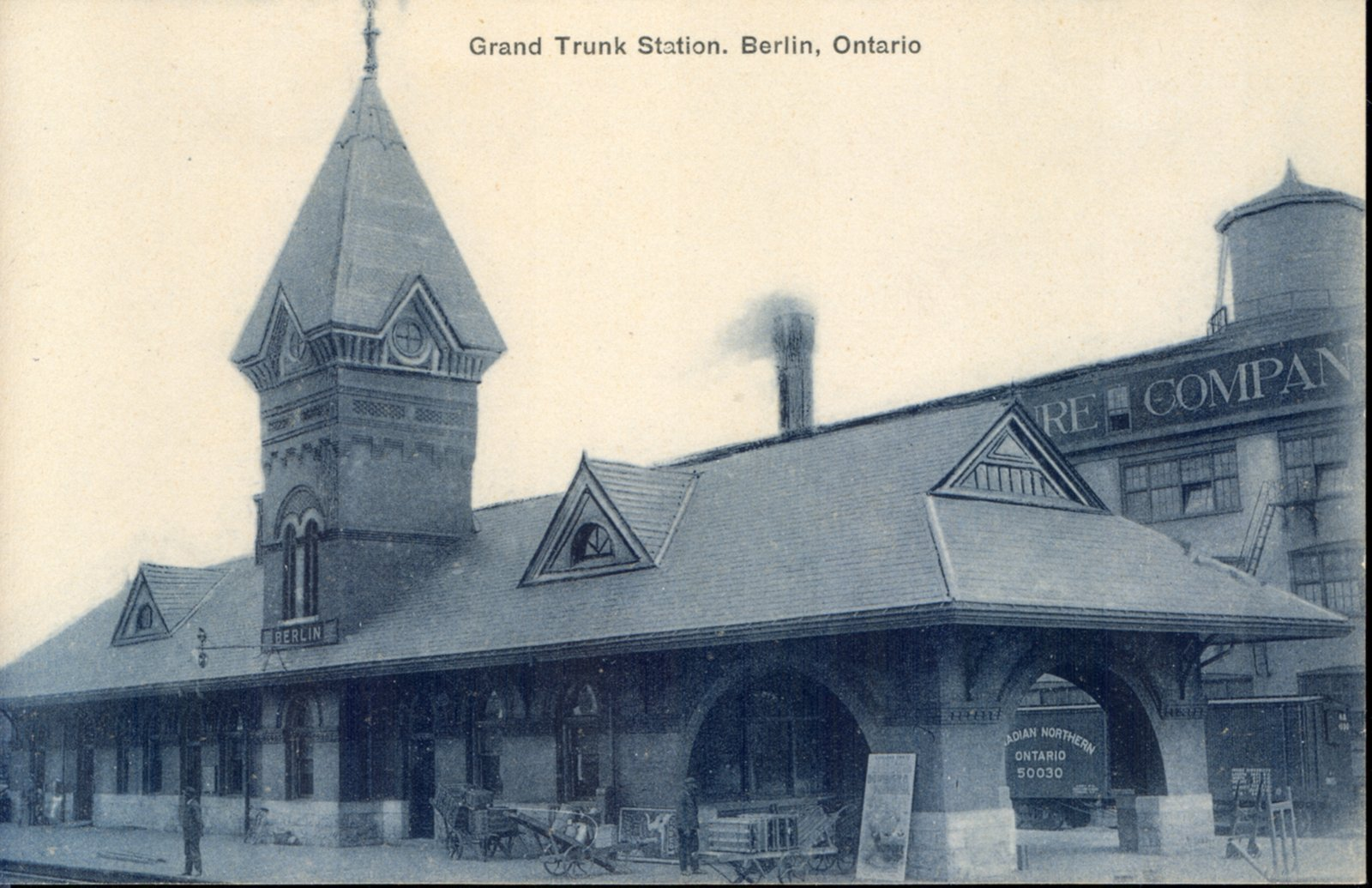
Postcard of Berlin GTR station

In 1856, the Grand Trunk Railway was in the process of a westward push, extending its Toronto–Brampton line. The first Grand Trunk train arrived in Guelph on January 30. On Wednesday, June 18, the first train arrived in Kitchener (then known as Berlin) with 150 passengers. The first Berlin railway station opened shortly after, on the 1st of July. The railway was extended beyond Berlin to St. Marys Junction in 1858, and to Sarnia in 1859.

In 1857, shortly after the arrival of the Grand Trunk, the Great Western Railway also arrived in Berlin via its subsidiary, the Preston and Berlin Railway. This branch line, the northern section of which still exists in the form of the CN Huron Park Spur, connected the northern Grand Trunk and southern Great Western mainlines to each other at a junction west of the newly built Kitchener Grand Trunk station, near King Street. The Great Western began to construct its own wooden station close to the junction, and had purchased land near the Grand Trunk station which would allow for either adjacent stations or a future union station. However, service on the Preston and Berlin line ended only a few months after it began due to the catastrophic collapse of its bridge over the Grand River, and the plans for a union station never bore fruit.

The Grand Trunk Railway built the current station building in 1897 to replace the original, smaller building built in 1856. The station building originally included a prominent Gothic clock tower. A second tower was added to the station after a 1908 fire. In 1916, the town of Berlin was renamed to Kitchener, and the station was renamed accordingly.

After the Great War, the Grand Trunk and several other financially distressed railways were nationalised and merged into the Canadian National Railway. The Guelph Subdivision was a secondary mainline for trains from Chicago, Michigan, and Western Ontario bound for Toronto and points East. Kitchener station served international GTR / CNR trains such as the Maple Leaf (Chicago - Port Huron - Toronto), as well as numerous regional trains.

In 1966, Canadian National Railway (CN), by this point the owner of the station, removed the clock tower and the other roof features. In 1983, CN threatened to demolish the station, but Via Rail, which had assumed responsibility for CN's passenger services in 1978, opted to retain it. Under the provisions of Canada's Heritage Railway Stations Protection Act, it was designated a railway heritage structure on February 15, 1994.

Between 1982 and 2004, Kitchener was served by the joint Via Rail-Amtrak International service between Chicago and Toronto.

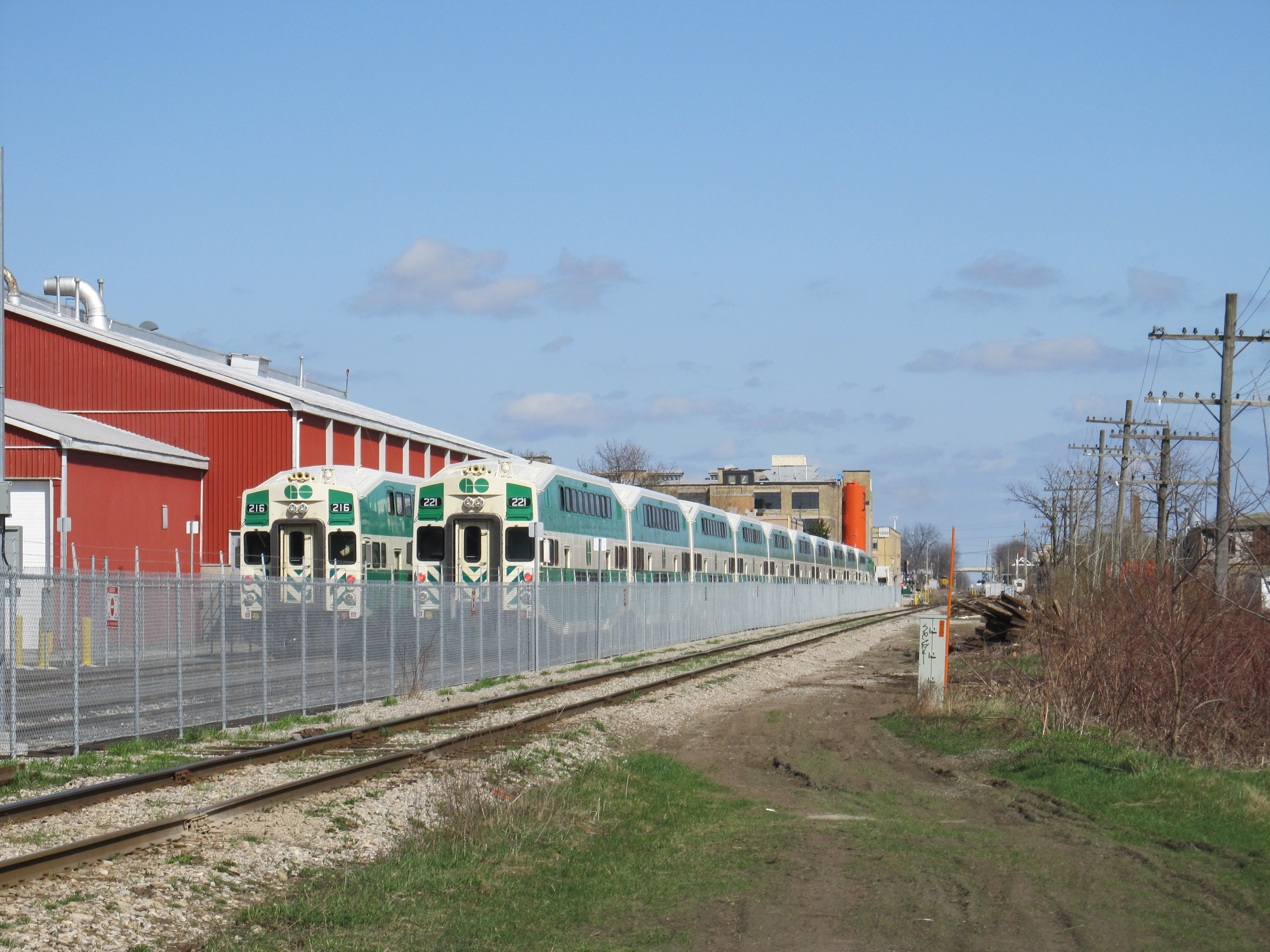
Pair of GO trains parked at the layover facility, located just west of the station

In November 2010, a partial rollout of GO train service was announced to be in place by late 2011. Two Kitchener line trains daily served Acton, Guelph and Kitchener with layover for those trains at a small facility in Kitchener. $18 million was spent to get this first stage operational, with further upgrades to come. Service began on December 19, serving only Kitchener and Guelph to begin with.

== Services ==
Service directly to the station is operated by GO Transit and Via Rail. In addition, GO Transit and Grand River Transit operate other bus services which stop near the station on either Weber Street or Victoria Street but do not enter the station's bus terminal.

=== Via Rail ===
Kitchener station is an intermediate stop on the Via Rail Toronto–London–Sarnia intercity train service, which forms a component of Via Rail's Corridor network. As of 2021, service consists of a single round trip per day.

=== GO Transit ===
The station is nominally the western terminus of GO Transit's Kitchener line regional/commuter rail service connecting Kitchener to Toronto via Guelph, Georgetown, and Brampton. As of 2021, the station was served by 10 eastbound and 9 westbound trains per weekday, one of which extended beyond Kitchener to London as part of a pilot project. The train to London ended service in October 2023, but service to Stratford station was permanently restored in 2026.

GO Transit bus route 30 also provides hourly bus service from Kitchener station to Bramalea GO Station where passengers can connect to hourly off-peak trains.

== Future ==
The Region of Waterloo plans to replace the existing Kitchener station with a new Kitchener Central Station or "Transit Hub" located at King Street where the railway crosses the Ion light rail line. The station would accommodate regional GO and intercity Via Rail trains, as well as intercity coach buses. The Central Station light rail stop opened in 2019 along with the light rail line itself. The Transit Hub construction will begin in 2025, with an opening date planned in 2029.

A larger GO train layover facility is planned west of Kitchener near Baden, in order to allow increased train service to Kitchener. In the meantime, trains are stored in an interim yard in Kitchener off Shirley Avenue east of the station.

In addition, an infill station known as Breslau GO is planned in the residential community of Breslau, across the Grand River to the east. The new station would be oriented around park and ride service, in order to address parking capacity without large-scale station parking downtown.

== See also ==
- List of historic places in Regional Municipality of Waterloo
- List of oldest buildings and structures in the Regional Municipality of Waterloo
- List of designated heritage railway stations of Canada
- Rail transport in Ontario
