= Etobicoke North GO Station =

Railway station in Toronto, Ontario, Canada

Etobicoke North
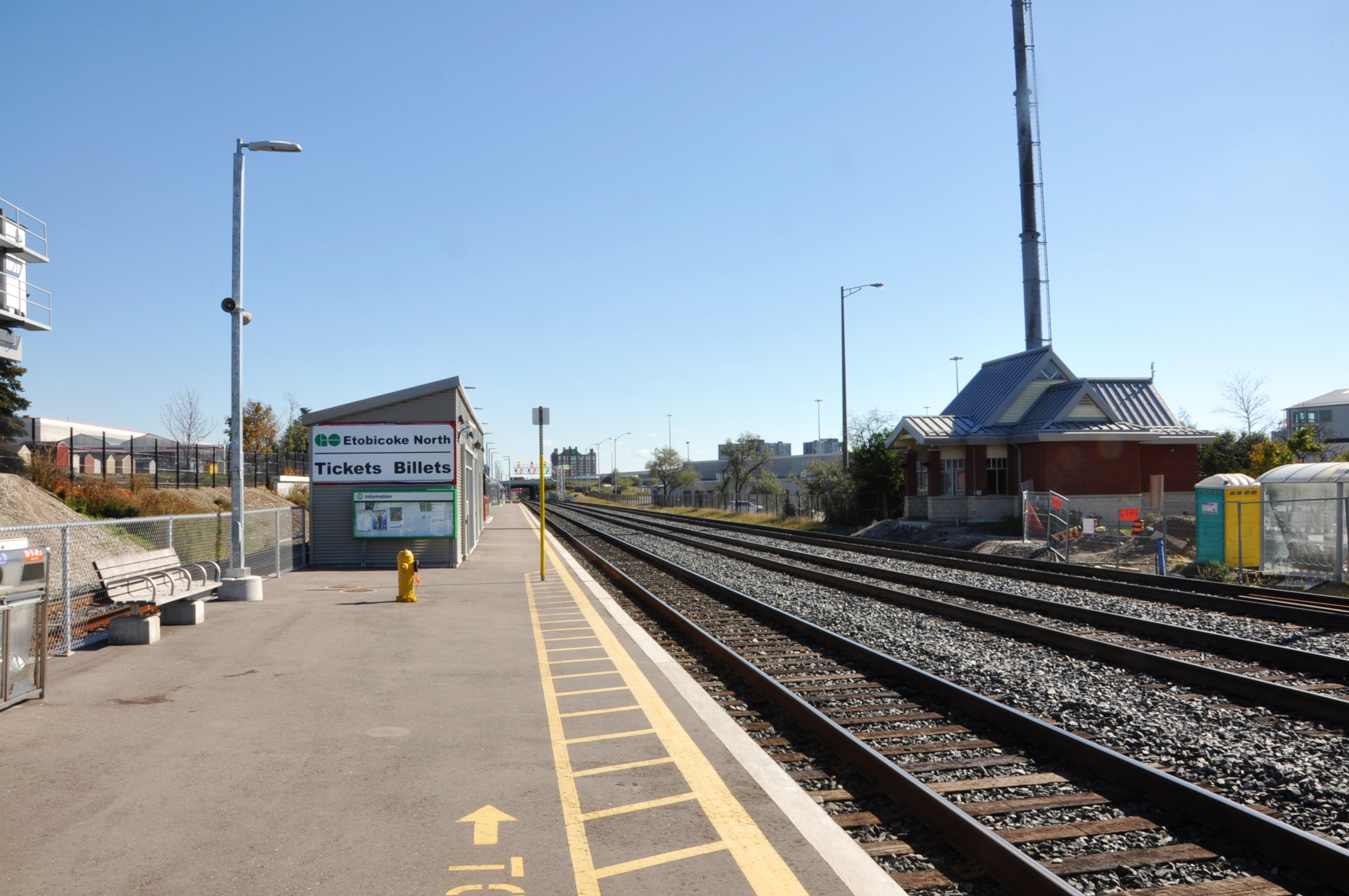

General information
- Location: 1949 Kipling Avenue; Etobicoke, Ontario; Canada
- Coordinates: 43°42′22″N 79°33′48″W
- Owner: Metrolinx
- Platforms: 1 side platform
- Tracks: 3 mainline 1 siding
- Connections: TTC buses

Construction
- Structure type: Waiting room and washroom
- Parking: 530 spaces
- Cycle facilities: racks
- Accessible: Yes

Other information
- Station code: GO Transit: ET
- Fare zone: 04

History
- Opened: 1974; 52 years ago

Services
Preceding station	GO Transit	Following station
Malton towards Stratford	Kitchener	Weston towards Union
Location

Etobicoke North GO Station is a GO Transit train and bus station on the Kitchener line in the Etobicoke district of Toronto, Ontario, Canada. It is located at 1949 Kipling Avenue just north of Belfield Road, close to the junction of Highways 401 and 409.

== Overview ==
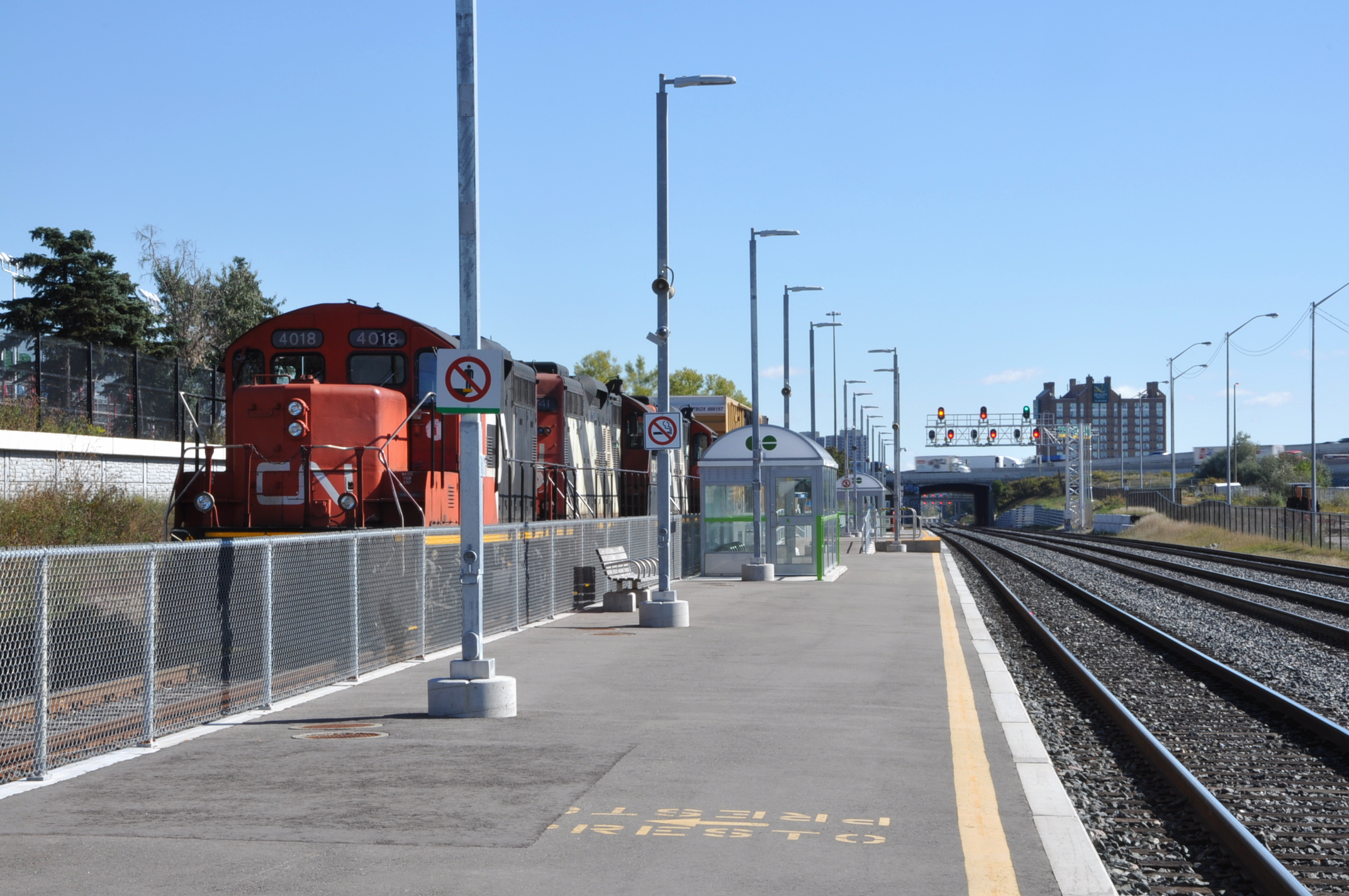
A train using the freight siding

The station has three mainline tracks and a single platform serving only the northernmost track. A fourth track passes along the north side of the station, but it is only used for local freight access so it is fenced off from the platform.

The platform can accommodate trains up to 12 cars long, and contains heated shelters and upgraded LED lighting.

== History ==
The station opened in late 1974, less than a year after GO Transit began operating the Georgetown (now Kitchener) line.

In 2013, construction began on the Georgetown South railway expansion project. In order to accommodate a widened railway and a significantly increased number of express trains, the original tracks and platforms were demolished and replaced. While the previous arrangement had been a 2-track railway with a side platform on the south side, the new configuration would be a 3-track railway with a side platform on the north side. The north parking lot was expanded to accommodate a new passenger pick-up and drop-off area and a bus loop, and the station building was also upgraded.

Until 29 June 2019, GO Transit operated connecting bus service at the station on route 38A, which operated during peak periods between Etobicoke North and Caledon via Humber College, Woodbridge and Bolton.

== Future ==
In December 2018, Metrolinx revealed a proposal to replace its Etobicoke North GO Station with a new GO station about two kilometres west, near Woodbine Racetrack. Demolishing the current Etobicoke North station would free up space for the railway to be widened from three mainline tracks to four. In June 2025, Metrolinx announced that Woodbine GO Station had begun construction and confirmed that Etobicoke North would be closed upon its completion.

== Services ==
Because only one of the three tracks has a platform, most Kitchener Line trains pass through Etobicoke North station without stopping. All Via Rail and UP Express trains also pass through the station without stopping. It is the only station along the Union Pearson Express route where those trains do not stop.

On weekdays during peak periods, GO trains stop every half hour in the peak direction, and there is no service in the counter-peak direction. On weekdays outside of peak periods, trains stop once per hour in each direction.

On weekends no trains stop at Etobicoke North station.

== Connecting transit ==
The closest bus stops are a short distance south on Kipling Avenue at Belfield Road, served by Toronto Transit Commission routes 45 Kipling & 945 Kipling Express. The station is connected by staircases and ramps from Kipling Avenue, which crosses below the tracks.
