= Breslau GO Station =

Future railway station in Woolwich, Ontario, Canada

Breslau

General information
- Location: Fountain Street; Woolwich, Ontario
- Coordinates: 43°29′7″N 80°23′45″W (expected)
- Owner: Metrolinx
- Platforms: Side platforms
- Tracks: 2
- Connections: GRT buses

Construction
- Parking: ~1000
- Accessible: Yes

History
- Opening: TBD

Services
Preceding station	GO Transit	Following station
Kitchener towards Stratford	Kitchener Planned expansion	Guelph Central towards Union
Location

Breslau GO Station is a planned GO Transit train station to be built by Metrolinx near the community of Breslau in Woolwich, Ontario, as part of the GO Expansion program. The preliminary plan is to provide approximately 1000 parking spaces. A kiss and ride area and a bus loop are also planned to be provided. Metrolinx expects the station's daily ridership to be 2,480 in 2031.

== History ==
=== Proposed GO station ===
The station was initially proposed in 2009 as part of the extension of the line from Georgetown to Kitchener and was meant to handle Waterloo Region's park and ride demand. Unlike many outside of the city of Toronto, the GO station in downtown Kitchener does not feature any free parking. The station was not built as part of that expansion and station was proposed again in 2015, as part of a larger list of potential future stations. In July 2016, the Initial Business Case analysis report was released, rating the station high for affordability and ease of construction but low for ridership.

On June 27, 2016, then-Minister of Transportation Steven Del Duca announced the station would be built as part of the RER program, and in 2019 Metrolinx approved the project including a completion date of 2025. However, in 2024 the project was described as still being in the "early stages". In June 2024, the Region of Waterloo purchased land in Breslau that could host a potential GO station and transit-oriented development. As of 2024, a required environmental assessment of the land has not been completed.

=== GTR/CNR Breslau Railway Station ===
The planned train station in Breslau is the community's second; the first was a single storey wood structure built by the Grand Trunk Railway in 1856. The GTR station was located on the south side of the tracks, and the west side of Woolwich Street South. Later assumed by Canadian National Railway as a railway/telegraph station, passenger service was abandoned sometime between 1961 and 1967. The station was demolished and is now the site of Fleischauer Brothers Landscaping.
