= Kitchener line =

Commuter rail service in Ontario, Canada

Kitchener
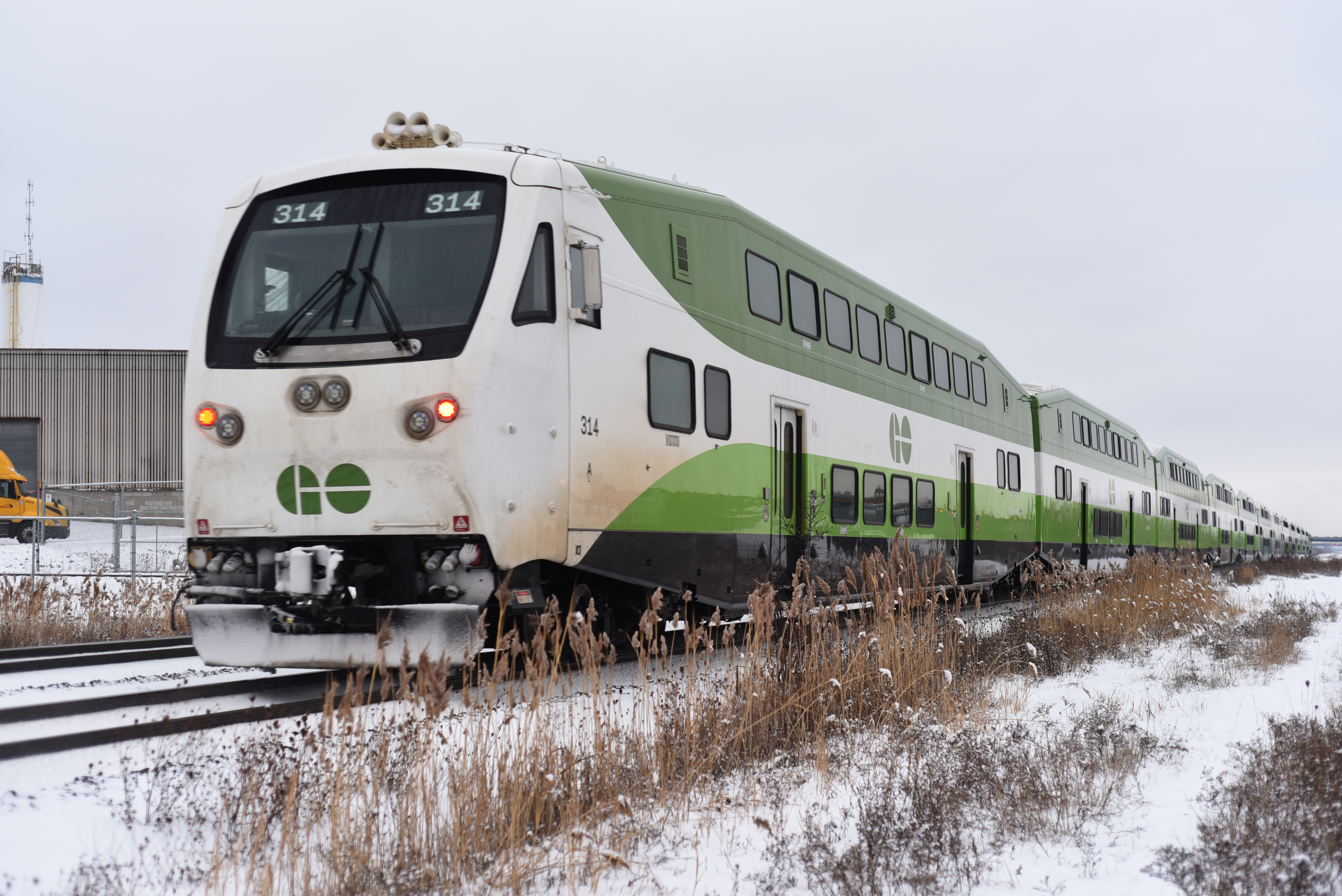
- A GO train on the Kitchener line train in Brampton

Overview
- Service type: Commuter rail
- System: GO Transit rail services
- Locale: Greater Toronto Area; Guelph; Waterloo Region; Stratford
- First service: April 29, 1974; 52 years ago
- Current operator: Alstom
- Daily ridership: 13,300 (2019)

Route
- Termini: Union; Stratford
- Stops: 14
- Distance travelled: 145 km (90 mi)

Technical
- Track gauge: 1,435 mm (4 ft 8 1/2 in) standard gauge
- Operating speed: 80 mph (128 km/h)
- Average length: 6–12 coaches
- Track owners: Metrolinx; Canadian National Railway

The Kitchener line is one of the seven passenger rail lines of the GO Transit system in the Greater Toronto Area, Ontario, Canada. It extends westward from Union Station in Toronto to Kitchener, though most trains originate and terminate in Brampton in off-peak hours. One train per day continues beyond Kitchener to Stratford.

== History ==
=== Services ===
The GO Transit Georgetown line opened on April 29, 1974, becoming the second line in the GO Transit rail network. Peak-direction train service operated between Georgetown and Union Station, replacing a commuter service previously operated by Canadian National Railway (CN).

Service was extended beyond Georgetown to Guelph on October 29, 1990, but was again cut back to Georgetown on July 2, 1993.

Limited weekday midday service was introduced in April 2002, with four trains in each direction between Union and Bramalea. These trains were discontinued in 2011 to facilitate construction of the Georgetown South Expansion project.

On December 19, 2011, the Georgetown Line was renamed the Kitchener Line as service was extended to Kitchener, making one intermediate stop at Guelph. Another intermediate stop, Acton, opened on January 7, 2013.

Weekday midday service was re-introduced in September 2015, with hourly service between Mount Pleasant and Union.

In September 2019, GO Transit introduced limited off-peak train service along the entire length of the line, with two new weekday round trips operating between Toronto and Kitchener outside of peak periods.

On October 18, 2021, service to London, Ontario began as a pilot project; one train per weekday in each direction runs as an extension of Kitchener line service, with intermediate stops in Stratford and St. Marys. The existing Via Rail station in each community served as each stop. Service beyond Kitchener was discontinued following the end of the project, on October 13, 2023. On July 6, 2026, service returned to Stratford with the addition of a weekend train running from Toronto to Stratford in the morning and back in the evening. However, only e-tickets loaded onto smartphones are available for Stratford trips. Physical tickets and Presto cards will not be accepted at the present time.

On April 8, 2023, hourly weekend service was introduced between Mount Pleasant and Union, with Kitchener express bus connections at Bramalea. Since the weekend service was introduced, passengers have complained about overcrowding on the new express buses between Bramalea and Kitchener, which at certain times resulted in some passengers being unable to board the buses.

On November 23, 2025, GO Transit introduced weekend service to Acton, Guelph, and Kitchener with four trains in the schedule: Two in each direction. Additionally, 30-minute weekend service began between Union and Bramalea.

=== Infrastructure ===
As a part of the GO Transit Rail Improvement Program, the West Toronto Diamond was grade separated. The Metrolinx Weston Subdivision, which carries the Kitchener Line as well as Union Pearson Express and Via trains, was lowered into a trench to pass under CP's North Toronto Subdivision. Trains began using the new grade separation in May 2014.

The Georgetown South railway expansion project was initiated in 2009 with Metrolinx now as its proponent. The project represented a significant increase in railway capacity, with the former one- to two-track railway being widened to 4 tracks within Toronto, with a total of 8 tracks where the Milton line and Barrie line share the corridor. All level crossings along the corridor were eliminated using railway or roadway underpasses. The plan would allow for an increased frequency of trains on the route, increasing service from approximately 50 per day to about 300. It drew criticism from Weston community groups, which opposed the increased use of diesel locomotives on the basis of air pollution. They preferred instead that the corridor be electrified. The group has also requested more stations along the route.

The Georgetown South project was later reduced in scope due to cost overruns: the corridor was expanded to three tracks, with the fourth track as well as the dedicated Barrie line tracks deferred to future projects. Construction on the Weston subdivision itself finished in 2015, allowing Union Pearson Express to begin operating, while additional track work in the Union Station Rail Corridor continued into 2016.

In 2009 Metrolinx purchased 26 kilometres (16 mi) of track along the corridor from Toronto to Bramalea for $160 million. In September 2014, it purchased the 53 kilometres (33 mi) of track from Georgetown to Kitchener from CN for $76 million.

In 2019, Metrolinx conducted a series of public forums on electrification of the Kitchener line from Georgetown to Kitchener, in a change from its earlier Regional Express Rail plan, which had called for continuation of diesel train service on the western portion of the line. Electrification plans reaffirmed overall Metrolinx goals of track bed and bridge improvements, quad-tracking sections of the line, and the addition of a station at Breslau.

In 2021, the second of two tunnels under Highways 401 and 409 was completed to allow two more tracks to be installed to increase Kitchener line capacity and support future all-day, two-way service.

On November 16, 2025, Mount Dennis station opened in the Mount Dennis neighbourhood of Toronto, with the station providing a direct transfer to the Toronto subway's Line 5 Eglinton after the line opened in 2026.

== Station list ==
Station	Municipality	Connections	Notes
Stratford	Stratford	Stratford Transit	
Kitchener	Kitchener	GRT	To be replaced by Kitchener Central Station
Breslau	Woolwich		Planned station
Guelph Central	Guelph	Guelph Transit	
Acton	Halton Hills	GO Transit GO Transit bus services	
Georgetown	Halton Hills	Mainline rail interchange	
Mount Pleasant	Brampton	Brampton Transit; 505 561	
Brampton	Brampton	Brampton Transit; 501 502 561	
Bramalea	Brampton	Brampton Transit; MiWay; 511	
Malton	Mississauga	MiWay; 505	
Woodbine	Toronto	TTC	Under construction
Etobicoke North	Toronto	TTC	To be closed upon Woodbine GO Station completion
Weston	Toronto	TTC	
Mount Dennis	Toronto	TTC	
Bloor	Toronto	TTC	
King–Liberty	Toronto	TTC	Planned station for Liberty Village
Union	Toronto	TTC	

== Current service ==
GO Transit train service previously operated on weekdays only. Weekend bi-directional hourly service was introduced on April 8, 2023, with all trains terminating at Mount Pleasant GO. During the times that trains do not operate, corresponding GO bus service is provided.

On weekdays during peak periods in the peak direction, approximately two trains per hour operate the full route between Toronto and Kitchener, while additional trips operate shorter segments to and from Toronto. Express trains typically serve all stations between Kitchener and Bramalea, and operate non-stop between Bramalea and Union.

Outside of peak periods, service operates hourly between Mount Pleasant and Union, of which two off-peak in each direction also cover the entire route from Kitchener to Toronto.

== Future expansion ==
=== Future stations ===
The Region of Waterloo is planning to build Kitchener Central Station, a transit hub, at the north-east corner of King and Victoria streets in Kitchener. The hub would serve GO Transit trains and buses as well as other local and intercity public transit services and would directly replace the existing Kitchener station.

A Breslau GO Station was proposed in 2008, and was included in an official expansion plan in June 2016. In 2024, the Region of Waterloo purchased land for the future station.

In 2025, construction began on a station near Woodbine Racetrack in Toronto. Upon the opening of Woodbine GO Station, Metrolinx plans to close Etobicoke North GO Station, which is located about two kilometres to the east.

As part of Toronto mayor John Tory's SmartTrack initiative, a new station is planned at King–Liberty GO Station near Liberty Village.

=== Future track improvements ===
The provincial initiative known as GO Expansion proposes upgrading the Kitchener line to increase service frequency, with the eventual goal of two-way, all-day hourly service to Kitchener, and two-way all-day 30-minute service to Mt. Pleasant, seven days a week. In 2021, the Province of Ontario predicted that with two-way, all-day service, ridership on the line would be about 11 million boardings annually by 2041.

Achieving the desired frequencies would require separate tracks for freight and passenger trains. CN Rail owns a 19-kilometre (12 mi) segment of the line between Georgetown and Bramalea that would be bypassed by a proposed 30-kilometre (19 mi) track to which freight traffic would be shunted. Once completed, Metrolinx will acquire the track segment between Bramalea and Georgetown. Between Georgetown and Kitchener, GO trains and CN freight trains share a single track line, which would need to be double-tracked.

In May 2022, Metrolinx announced that the construction contract was awarded to Dagmar Construction Inc. The work would include:

- a second platform at Guelph Central GO Station
- an extension of the north platform at Guelph Central GO Station
- a new storage track for maintenance vehicles west of Guelph
- a new passing track 2.6 kilometres (1.6 mi) long in Breslau (Woolwich Township)
- a new passing track at Acton GO Station
- a new storage track for maintenance vehicles near Rockwood
- track re-alignments between Kitchener and Georgetown

By October 2025, Metrolinx had reached an agreement with CN in order to upgrade the line west of Georgetown for all-day, two-way hourly service to Kitchener. The planned work includes adding 40 kilometres (25 mi) of new track, signal upgrades, bridge work, track re-alignments and platform expansions. There would be dedicated tracks for GO trains.

== See also ==
- Halton Subdivision – Canadian National rail line between Brampton and Georgetown partially used by Kitchener line trains
- Quebec City–Windsor Corridor (Via Rail) – larger trans-provincial rail corridor which includes the Kitchener line route
- Rail transport in Ontario
