= Stratford station (Ontario) =

Railway station in Ontario, Canada

Stratford
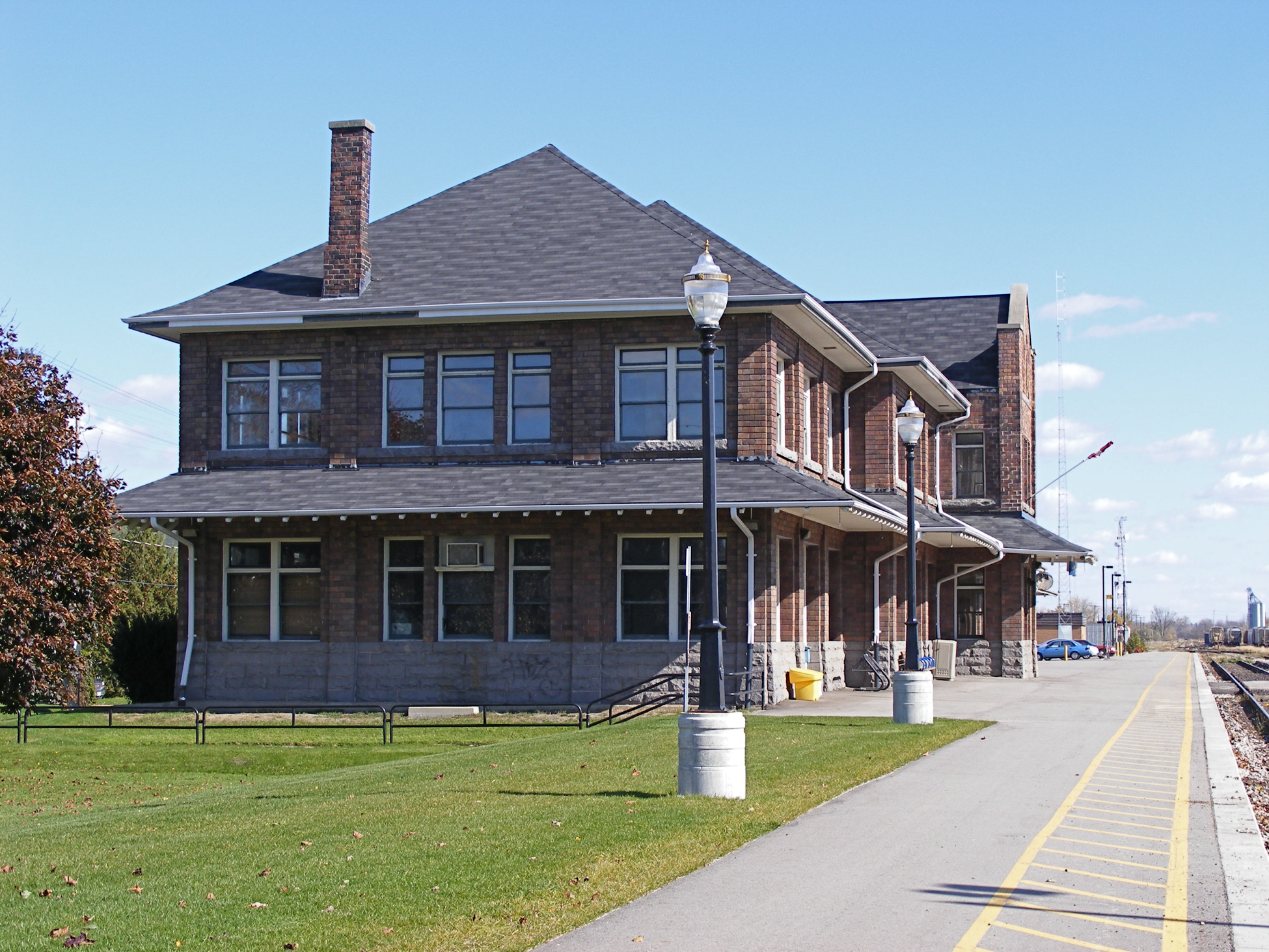
- Current buildings, constructed by the GTR in 1913

General information
- Location: 101 Shakespeare St, Stratford, Ontario; Canada
- Coordinates: 43°21′52″N 80°58′33″W
- Owner: Via Rail
- Platforms: 1 side platform
- Tracks: 2

Construction
- Structure type: Historic railway station
- Parking: Yes
- Accessible: Yes

Other information
- Status: Unstaffed station
- Station code: GO Transit: SF

History
- Opened: 1856
- Rebuilt: 1913, opened August 1914
- Former names: Grand Trunk Railway

Services
Preceding station	Via Rail	Following station
St. Marys toward Sarnia	Sarnia–Toronto	Kitchener toward Toronto
Preceding station	GO Transit	Following station
Terminus	Kitchener (express)	Kitchener towards Union
Former services
Preceding station	Amtrak	Following station
St. Marys toward Chicago	International	Kitchener toward Toronto
Preceding station	Canadian National Railway	Following station
St. Pauls toward Sarnia	Sarnia – Toronto via Lucan Crossing	Shakespeare toward Toronto
St. Pauls toward London	London – Stratford	Terminus
Sebringville toward Goderich	Goderich – Stratford	Terminus
Terminus	Stratford – Fort Erie	Tavistock toward Fort Erie

Heritage Railway Station (Canada)
- Designated: 1993
- Reference no.: 15767

Ontario Heritage Act
- Official name: 101 Shakespeare Street VIA Rail Station
- Designated: June 13, 1988
Location

Stratford station is a railway station in Stratford, Ontario, Canada. It is served by Via Rail services between Toronto, London and Sarnia, and is the western terminus of the GO Transit Kitchener line.

== History ==
From the fall of 1863, a young Thomas Edison worked as a telegrapher at the Stratford, Ontario station of the Grand Trunk Railroad. Edison's father was from Canada and fled to US after the Rebellion of 1837.

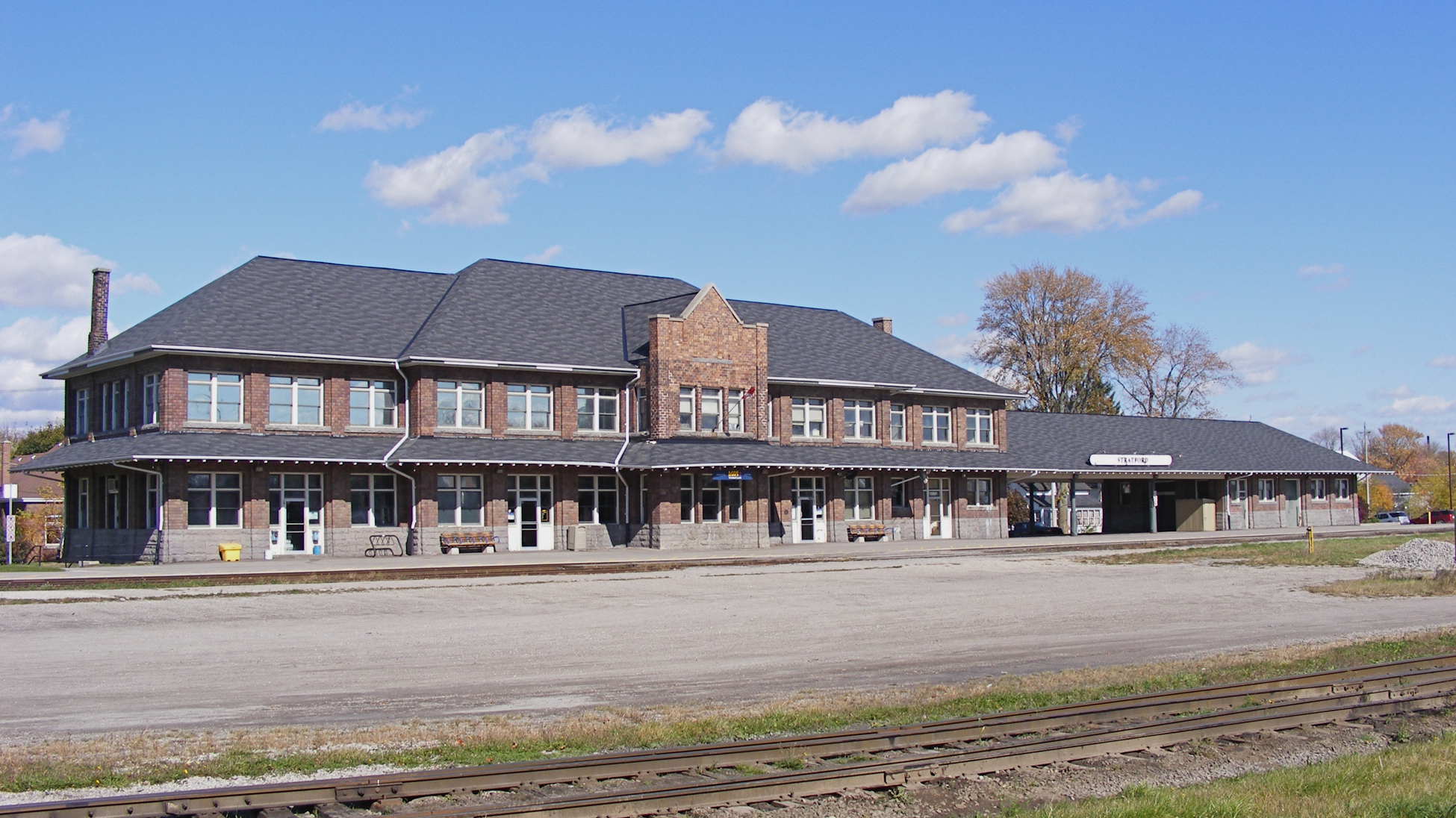
Historic 1913 GTR station

Two structures remain that were built in 1913 by the Grand Trunk Railway (GTR): a two-storey, brick-clad, railway station building, and a one-storey express building linked by an overhead canopy. The GTR merged into the Canadian National Railway in 1920. In addition to serving regional trains, it served international trains to Michigan and Chicago, including the Grand Trunk's long-running Maple Leaf.

The station buildings were designated as a Heritage Railway Station in 1993. The station is also designated under Part IV of the Ontario Heritage Act since June 13, 1988.

The Ontario Heritage Act designation notes that the station is built in the Prairie Style of architecture, influenced by Frank Lloyd Wright. It was erected by the Grand Trunk in 1913 and opened in August 1914. The designation covers the exterior of the whole structure, roof, masonry, windows, original doors and brick platforms (these were covered at the time of the designation in 1988). The building included a tower, that has since been removed.

The International Limited was operated jointly by Via Rail and Amtrak between Chicago and Toronto. The service operated from 1982–2004.

On October 18, 2021, a GO Transit pilot project began weekday service to London, with a stop in Stratford. The pilot ended in 2023.

In July 2026, GO Transit permanently restored one daily round trip between Stratford and Toronto. Weekday trains are timed to support commuting, while weekend trains are timed to support tourism to Stratford.

== Services ==
As of July 2026, Stratford station is served by two trains per day in each direction:

- One daily round trip on the Via Rail Corridor between Toronto and Sarnia
- One daily round trip on the GO Transit Kitchener line between Toronto and Stratford. On weekdays, GO services depart Stratford in the morning to Toronto, returning in the evening. On weekends, GO services depart Toronto in the morning to Stratford, returning to Toronto in the evening..

== See also ==
- Quebec City–Windsor Corridor (Via Rail) – trans-provincial passenger rail corridor which includes Stratford
- Rail transport in Ontario
- List of designated heritage railway stations of Canada
