= GO Transit bus services =

Bus services provided by GO Transit

GO Bus

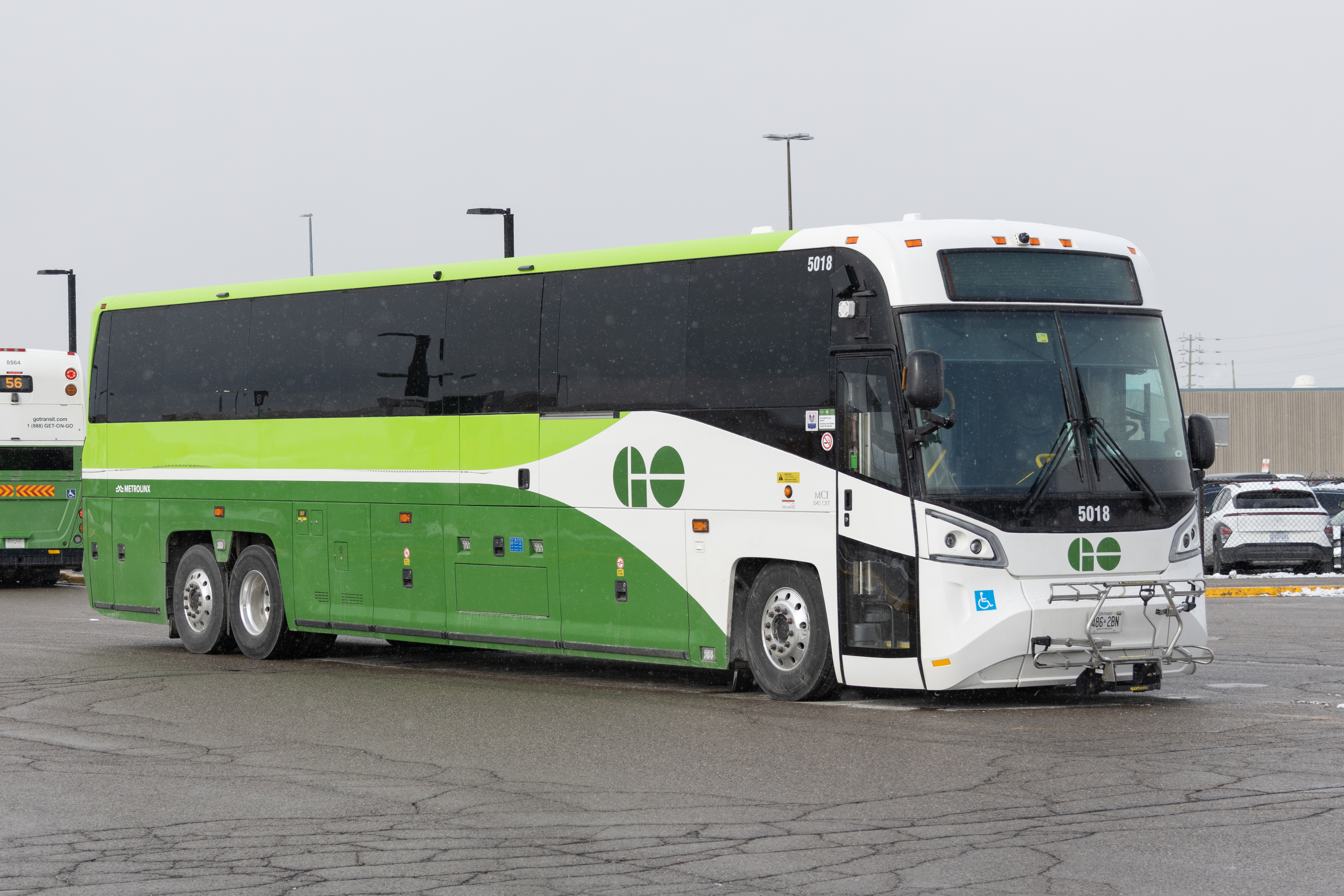
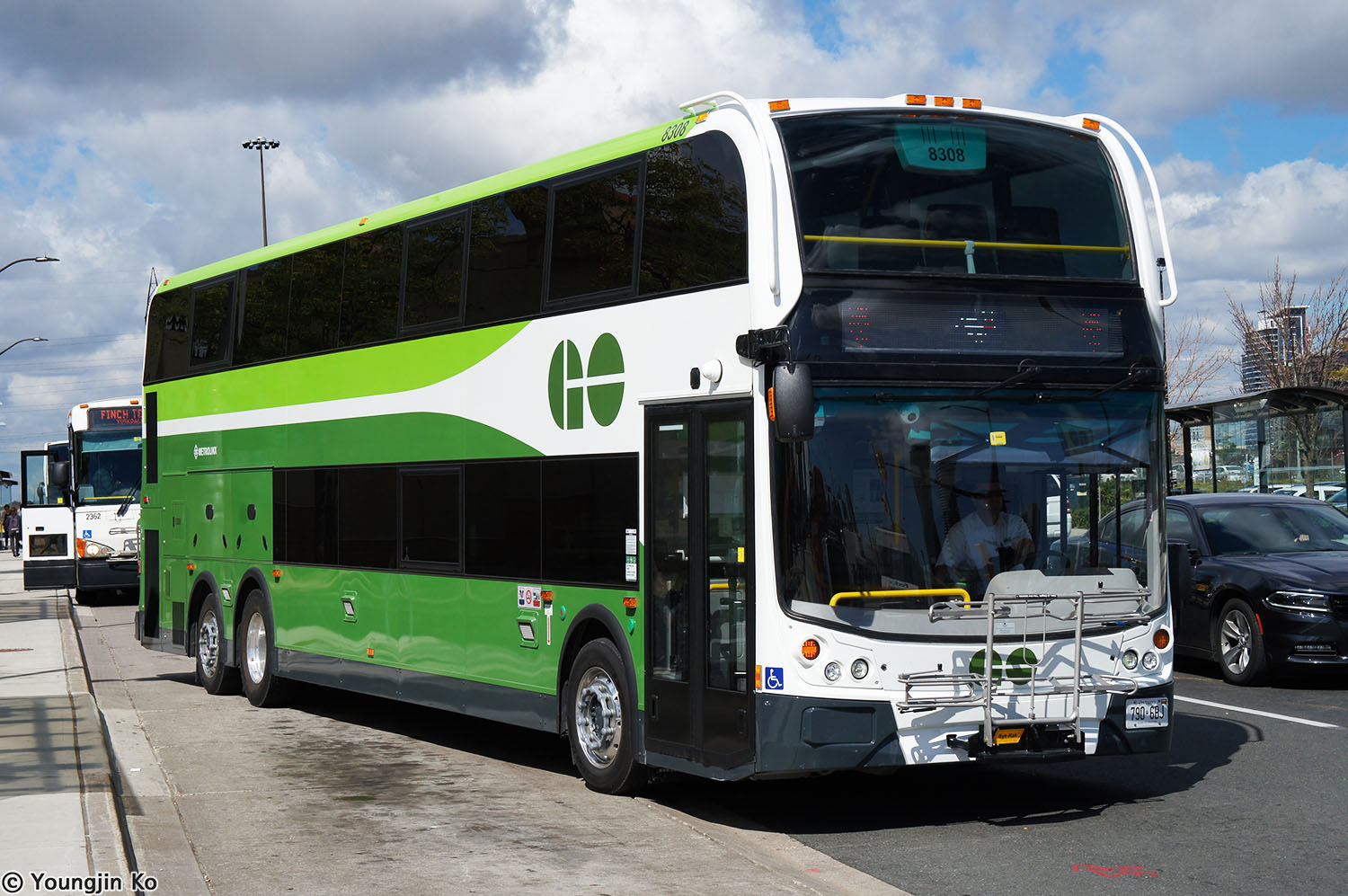
- Single-level MCI D-Series coach bus Double-decker Alexander Dennis Enviro500 bus
- Parent: GO Transit
- Founded: September 8, 1970; 56 years ago
- Service area: Greater Golden Horseshoe
- Service type: Intercity bus, rail replacement
- Stops: 844
- Stations: 47
- Fleet: 752
- Annual ridership: 18,405,400 (2025)
- Fuel type: Diesel, electric
- Operator: Metrolinx
- Website: gotransit.com

The GO Bus system is the regional and intercity bus network of GO Transit in the Greater Toronto and Hamilton Area (GTHA) and Greater Golden Horseshoe. In 2025, the system had a ridership of 18,405,400.

While GO Transit started as a single train line in 1967, 15 buses were introduced on September 8, 1970, extending service beyond the original Lakeshore line to Hamilton and Oshawa, as well as providing service north to Newmarket and Barrie. In 1989, GO started running buses between outer train stations and Union at off-peak times when trains were not scheduled. The bus network started expanding beyond train lines, feeding rail service and serving communities beyond the reach of existing trains. In 2000, GO Transit went beyond its existing train corridors and began service along Highway 407, linking York University to Oshawa, Mississauga and Oakville.

The GO Bus fleet consists of 366 single-level coach buses and 375 double-decker buses. Two of the coach buses are diesel-electric hybrid vehicles. GO Transit began acquiring double-decker buses in 2007 to relieve crowding on some routes. The first generation stood at a height of 4.3 metres, and second and third generations were built and acquired at even lower heights – in 2013 and 2016 at 4.15 and 3.9 metres, respectively – that allowed them to pass under lower bridges and trees and be used on additional routes. All of the buses are equipped with bike racks.

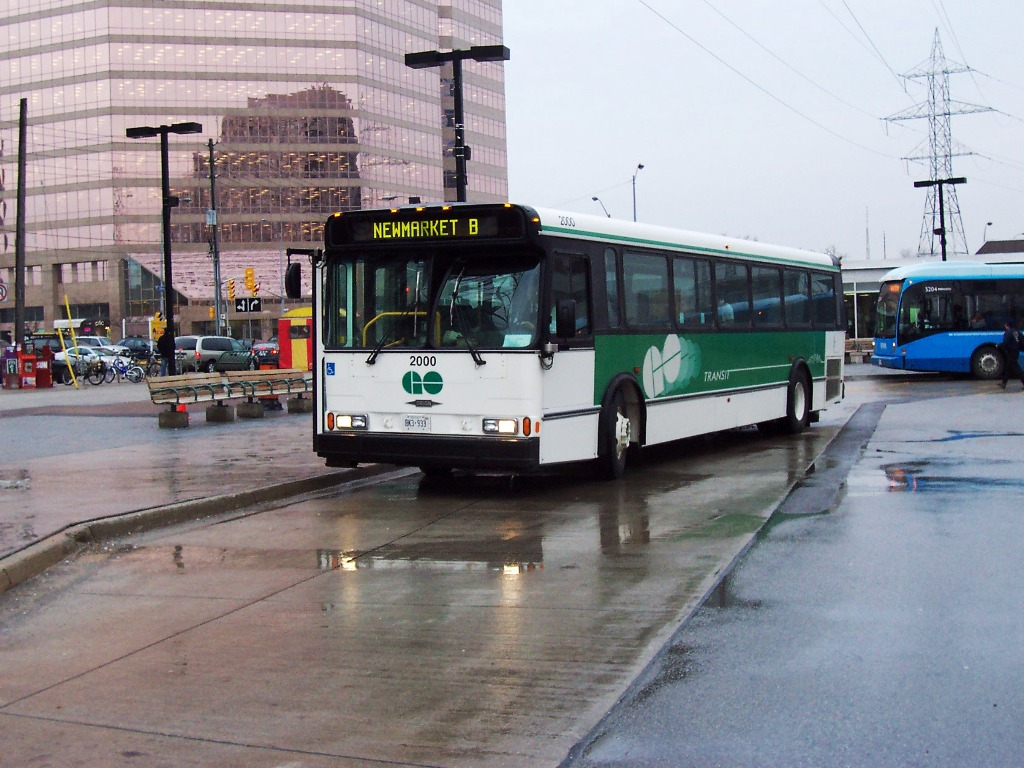
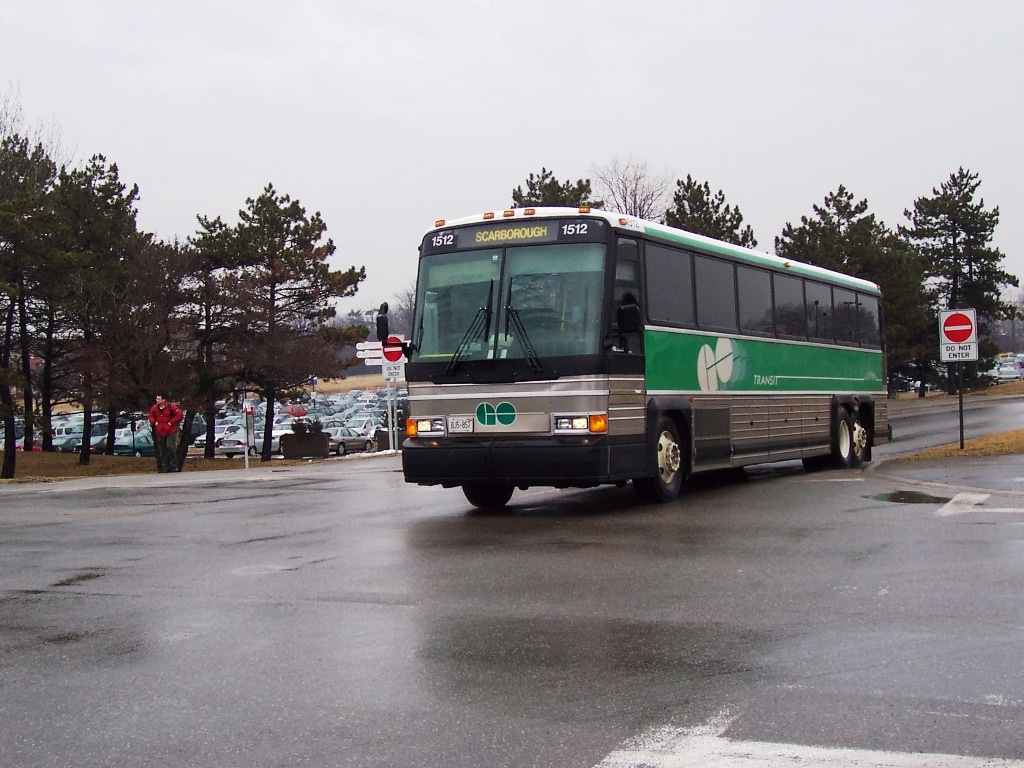
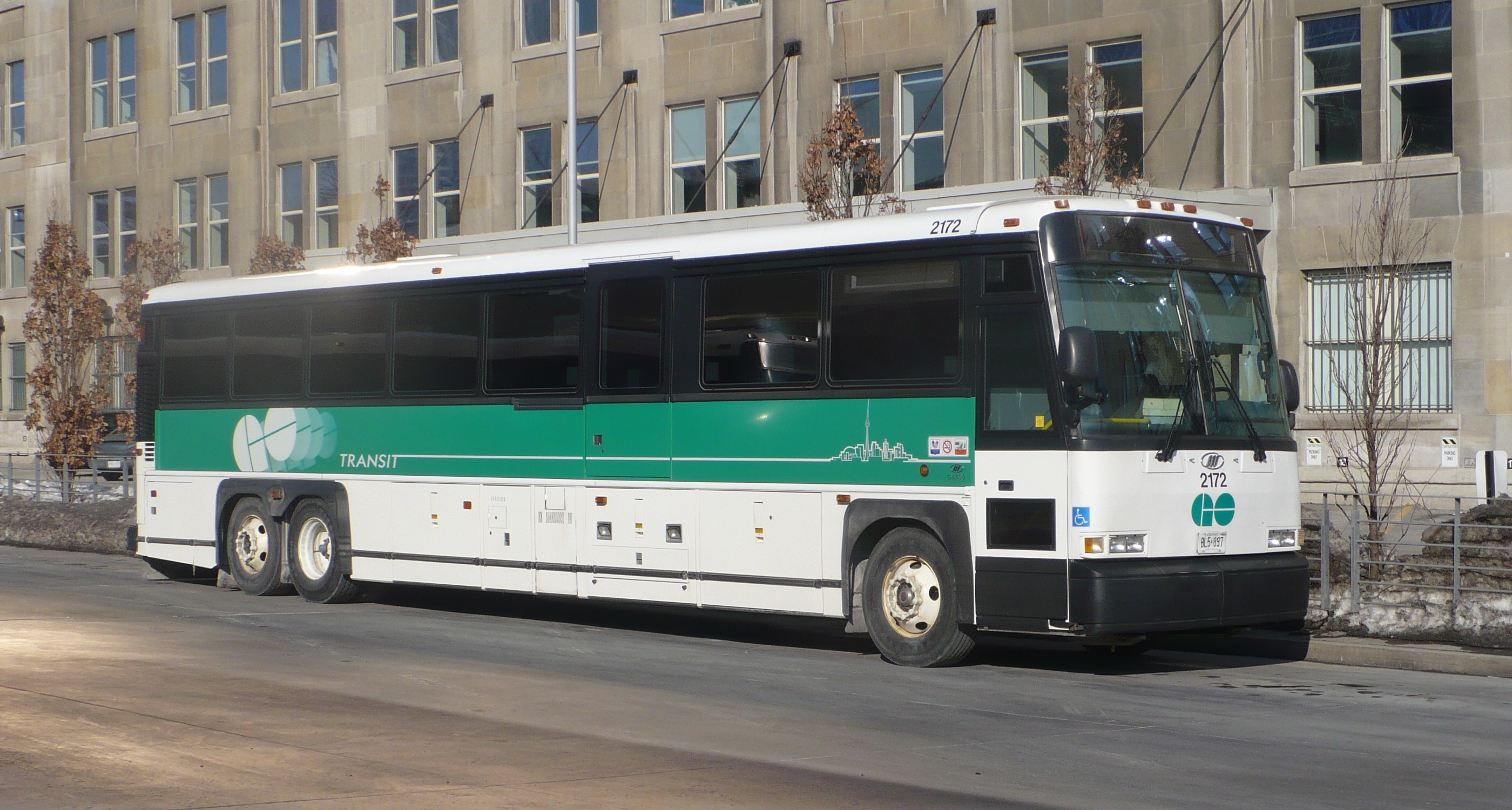
Older buses previously used by GO Transit.

GO buses serve 15 bus terminals, as well as several local stops which include carpool/park and ride lots established by the Ministry of Transportation along Ontario highways. On average, 2,458 weekday and 1,218 weekend bus trips are made, with 70% of all bus travellers going to or from Toronto. All GO Transit fares are calculated by the fare zones that the origin and destination of the trip are in, as well as by passenger category (adult, student, senior or child). GO Bus fares are not differentiated based whether or not trains are used for part of the trip.

== Routes ==
=== Lakeshore West corridor ===
Route		Major stops	Notes
Lakeshore West	11	Aldershot GO; Hamilton GO; West Harbour GO; Confederation GO; Grimsby Carpool; Beamsville Carpool; St. Catharines GO; Brock University	Limited weekday service
Niagara Falls/Toronto	12	Burlington Carpool; Burlington GO; Confederation GO; Grimsby Carpool; Beamsville Carpool; St. Catharines Fairview Mall; Niagara College; Niagara Falls P&R; Niagara Falls Bus Terminal	
Niagara Falls/Toronto	12A	Burlington Carpool; Burlington GO; Confederation GO; Grimsby Carpool	Weekday Toronto-bound
Niagara Falls/Toronto	12B	Burlington GO; Niagara Falls P&R; Niagara Falls Bus Terminal	Express service
Niagara Falls/Toronto	12D	Burlington GO; St. Catharines Fairview Mall; Niagara College; Niagara Falls P&R; Niagara Falls Bus Terminal	Express service
Brantford/Burlington	15	Aldershot GO; McMaster University; McMaster Innovation Park; Brantford Bus Terminal	
Brantford/Burlington	15A	Aldershot GO; McMaster University	Seasonal Friday eastbound
Brantford/Burlington	15B	Aldershot GO; McMaster University; McMaster Innovation Park; Brantford Bus Terminal; Six Nations of the Grand River Reserve; Mississaugas of the Credit First Nation	
Hamilton/Toronto Express	16	Union; Hamilton GO	
Lakeshore West	18	Aldershot GO; Hamilton GO	
Lakeshore West	18A	Union; Oakville GO; Bronte GO; Appleby GO; Burlington GO; Aldershot GO; Hamilton GO; West Harbour GO	Limited weekend express
Lakeshore West	18B	Union; Port Credit GO; Clarkson GO; Oakville GO; Burlington GO; Aldershot GO; Hamilton GO	Eastbound limited express (weekend only)
Lakeshore West	18C	Union; Port Credit GO; Clarkson GO; Oakville GO; Bronte GO; Appleby GO; Burlington GO; Aldershot GO; Hamilton GO	Sunday–Friday service
Lakeshore West	18E	Union; Port Credit GO; Clarkson GO; Oakville GO; Bronte GO; Appleby GO; Burlington GO; Aldershot GO; West Harbour GO	Eastbound service (Sunday-Thursday only)
Lakeshore West	18F	Union; Oakville GO; Bronte GO; Appleby GO; Burlington GO; Aldershot GO; Hamilton GO	Westbound express (Monday-Saturday only)
Lakeshore West	18G	Union; Oakville GO; Burlington GO; Aldershot GO; Hamilton GO	Weekday limited eastbound express
Lakeshore West	18H	Union; Port Credit GO; Clarkson GO; Oakville GO	
Lakeshore West	18J	Union; Port Credit GO; Clarkson GO; Oakville GO; Bronte GO; Appleby GO; Burlington GO; Aldershot GO; Hamilton GO; West Harbour GO	Saturday-Thursday service

=== Milton corridor ===
Route		Major stops	Notes
Waterloo/Hamilton	17	University of Waterloo; Wilfrid Laurier University; Guelph GO; University of Guelph; Aberfoyle P&R; Aldershot GO; McMaster University; Hamilton GO	Weekdays
Waterloo/Hamilton	17B	University of Waterloo; Wilfrid Laurier University; Kitchener GO; Aberfoyle P&R; Burlington GO	Summer Weekends
Mississauga/North York	19	Finch; Sheppard–Yonge; Yorkdale; Keele & Highway 401; Renforth; Dixie; Square One	
Milton	21	Union; Cooksville GO; Square One; Erindale GO; Streetsville GO; Meadowvale GO; Meadowvale Town Centre; Lisgar GO; Milton GO	Weekdays
Milton	21A	Union; Meadowvale GO; Meadowvale Town Centre; Milton GO	
Milton	21B	Union; Erindale GO; Streetsville GO; Lisgar GO	Weekdays
Milton	21C	Union; Cooksville GO; Square One	
Milton	21D	Union; Cooksville GO; Square One; Erindale GO; Streetsville GO; Meadowvale GO	Weekends
Milton	21E	Union; Cooksville GO; Square One; Erindale GO; Streetsville GO; Lisgar GO	Weekdays
Milton	21F	Union; Cooksville GO; Square One; Erindale GO; Streetsville GO; Meadowvale GO; Meadowvale Town Centre; Milton GO	Weekends
Milton/Oakville	22	Oakville GO; Sheridan College; Oakville Carpool; Milton GO; Milton Carpool	Weekdays
Waterloo/Mississauga	25	Square One; Erin Mills; Winston Churchill; Milton Carpool; Aberfoyle P&R; Cambridge SmartCentres; Sportsworld P&R; Wilfrid Laurier University; University of Waterloo	
Waterloo/Mississauga	25A	Square One; Milton Carpool; Wilfrid Laurier University; University of Waterloo	Weekdays
Waterloo/Mississauga	25C	Square One; Wilfrid Laurier University; University of Waterloo	Express
Waterloo/Mississauga	25K	Kipling; Renforth; Dixie; Square One; Erin Mills; Winston Churchill; Toronto Premium Outlets; Milton Carpool; Aberfoyle P&R; Cambridge SmartCentres; Sportsworld P&R; Wilfrid Laurier University; University of Waterloo	Seasonal Weekends
Waterloo/Mississauga	25L	Square One; Erin Mills; Winston Churchill; Toronto Premium Outlets; Milton Carpool; Aberfoyle P&R; Cambridge SmartCentres; Sportsworld P&R; Wilfrid Laurier University; University of Waterloo	Seasonal Weekends
Milton/North York	27A	Finch; Sheppard–Yonge; Yorkdale; Keele & Highway 401; Meadowvale Business Park; Meadowvale GO; Meadowvale Town Centre; Milton GO	Weekday off peak and weekends
Milton/North York	27B	Finch; Sheppard–Yonge; Yorkdale; Keele & Highway 401; Meadowvale Business Park; Meadowvale GO	Weekday off peak and weekends
Milton/North York	27D	Finch; Sheppard–Yonge; Yorkdale; Keele & Highway 401; Missisauga & Meadowvale; Meadowvale Business Park; Meadowvale GO; Meadowvale Town Centre; Milton GO	Rush hour only
Milton/North York	27F	Finch; Sheppard–Yonge; Yorkdale; Keele & Highway 401; Missisauga & Meadowvale; Meadowvale Business Park; Meadowvale GO	Rush hour only

=== Kitchener corridor ===
Route		Major stops	Notes
Guelph/Mississauga	29	Kipling; Renforth; Dixie; Square One; Erin Mills; Winston Churchill; Milton Carpool; Aberfoyle P&R; University of Guelph; Guelph Central GO	
Guelph/Mississauga	29A	Square One; Erin Mills; Winston Churchill; Milton Carpool; Aberfoyle P&R; University of Guelph	
Kitchener	30	Highway 407; Bramalea GO; Meadowvale Business Park; Kitchener; Kitchener GO; Wilfrid Laurier University; University of Waterloo	
Kitchener	30A	Bramalea GO; Kitchener; Kitchener GO; Wilfrid Laurier University; University of Waterloo	Express
Kitchener	30E	Bramalea GO; Wilfrid Laurier University; University of Waterloo	Express
Kitchener	30F	Highway 407; Bramalea GO; Wilfrid Laurier University; University of Waterloo	Limited eastbound trips
Kitchener	30G	Highway 407; Bramalea GO; Meadowvale Business Park; Wilfrid Laurier University; University of Waterloo	Limited eastbound trips
Kitchener	31	Union; Malton GO; Bramalea GO; Steeles Ave & Rutherford Rd; Shoppers World; Brampton GO; Mount Pleasant GO; Norval; Georgetown GO; Georgetown; Acton GO; Rockwood; Guelph Central GO; University of Guelph	Weekday limited westbound
Kitchener	31A	Union; Steeles Ave & Rutherford Rd; Shoppers World; Brampton GO; Mount Pleasant GO; Norval; Georgetown GO; Georgetown; Acton GO; Rockwood; Guelph Central GO; University of Guelph	Westbound limited trips
Kitchener	31B	Bramalea GO; Steeles Ave & Rutherford Rd; Shoppers World; Brampton GO; Mount Pleasant GO; Norval; Georgetown GO; Georgetown; Acton GO; Rockwood; Guelph Central GO; University of Guelph	Weekdays
Kitchener	31E	Union; Malton GO; Bramalea GO; Steeles Ave & Rutherford Rd; Shoppers World; Brampton GO; Mount Pleasant GO; Norval; Georgetown GO	
Kitchener	31F	Union; Steeles Ave & Rutherford Rd; Shoppers World; Brampton GO; Mount Pleasant GO; Norval; Georgetown GO	Limited eastbound trips
Kitchener	31K	Union; Steeles Ave & Rutherford Rd; Shoppers World; Brampton GO; Mount Pleasant GO	Limited trips
Kitchener	31L	Union; Malton GO; Bramalea GO	Express
Kitchener	31M	Brampton GO; Mount Pleasant GO; Georgetown GO; Georgetown; Acton GO; Guelph Central GO; University of Guelph	Limited westbound trips
Kitchener	31X	Union; Malton GO; Bramalea GO; Steeles Ave & Rutherford Rd; Shoppers World; Brampton GO; Mount Pleasant GO	Weekend limited trips
Brampton Trinity; Common/North York	32	Finch; Bramalea GO; Williams Pkwy Carpool; Trinity Common	Weekdays
Brampton Trinity; Common/North York	32B	Finch; Bramalea GO; Bramalea Terminal	Weekdays
Kitchener	33	York Mills; Yorkdale; Keele & Highway 401; Hurontario & 407 P&R; Shoppers World; Brampton GO; Mount Pleasant GO; Norval; Georgetown GO; Georgetown; Acton GO; Rockwood; Guelph Central GO; University of Guelph	Weekdays
Kitchener	33A	York Mills; Yorkdale; Keele & Highway 401; Hurontario & 407 P&R; Shoppers World; Brampton GO	Weekdays
Kitchener	33B	York Mills; Yorkdale; Keele & Highway 401; Hurontario & 407 P&R; Shoppers World; Brampton GO; Mount Pleasant GO	Weekdays
Kitchener	33E	York Mills; Yorkdale; Keele & Highway 401; Hurontario & 407 P&R; Shoppers World; Brampton GO; Mount Pleasant GO; Norval; Georgetown GO	Weekdays
Kitchener	33F	Mount Pleasant GO; Norval; Georgetown GO; Georgetown; Acton GO; Rockwood; Guelph Central GO; University of Guelph	Weekday eastbound
Kitchener	33G	Mount Pleasant GO; Norval; Georgetown; Georgetown GO	Weekends and holidays
Kitchener	33H	Bramalea GO; Steeles Ave & Rutherford Rd; Shoppers World; Brampton GO; Mount Pleasant GO; Norval; Georgetown GO	Weekday limited eastbound
Brampton/North York	36B	York Mills; Yorkdale; Keele & Highway 401; Bramalea GO; Bramalea Terminal	
Orangeville/Brampton	37	Brampton GO; Snelgrove; Victoria; Caledon Carpool; Orangeville Carpool; Orangeville Mall; Orangeville; Orangeville P&R	Weekdays
Orangeville/Brampton	37A	Brampton GO; Snelgrove; Victoria; Caledon Carpool; Orangeville Carpool; Orangeville Mall	Weekday northbound
Orangeville/Brampton	37B	Brampton GO; Snelgrove; Victoria; Caledon Carpool; Orangeville Carpool; Orangeville P&R	Weekday southbound
Orangeville/Brampton	37C	Bramalea GO; Victoria; Caledon Carpool; Orangeville Carpool; Orangeville Mall	Weekday limited southbound
Orangeville/Brampton	37D	Bramalea GO; Victoria; Caledon Carpool; Orangeville Carpool; Orangeville P&R	Weekday limited southbound
Bolton/Malton	38	Malton GO; Bolton South P&R; Bolton P&R; Bolton	Weekdays

=== Highway 407 corridor ===
Route		All stops	Notes
Hamilton/Richmond Hill	40	Richmond Hill Centre; Highway 407; Pearson; Renforth; Dixie; Square One; Oakville Carpool; Burlington Carpool; Hamilton GO	24hr service
Hamilton/Richmond Hill	40C	Unionville GO; Richmond Hill Centre; Highway 407; Pearson; Renforth; Dixie; Square One; Oakville Carpool; Burlington Carpool; Hamilton GO	24hr service
Hamilton/Richmond Hill	40H	Richmond Hill Centre; Highway 407; Humber College; Pearson; Renforth; Dixie; Square One; Oakville Carpool; Burlington Carpool; Hamilton GO	Weekday limited
Hamilton/Richmond Hill	40M	Unionville GO; Richmond Hill Centre; Highway 407; Humber College; Pearson; Renforth; Dixie; Square One; Oakville Carpool; Burlington Carpool; Hamilton GO	Weekday limited
Hamilton/Pickering	41	Pickering GO; Pickering; University of Toronto Scarborough; Centennial College; Scarborough Centre; North York; Richmond Hill Centre; Highway 407; Bramalea GO; Square One; Erin Mills; Oakville Carpool; Bronte Carpool; Burlington P&R; McMaster University; Hamilton GO	Weekdays
Hamilton/Pickering	41A	Pickering GO; Pickering; University of Toronto Scarborough; Centennial College; North York; Highway 407; Bramalea GO; Square One	Weekdays
Hamilton/Pickering	41C	Centennial College; North York; Highway 407; Bramalea GO; Square One	Weekdays
Hamilton/Pickering	41F	University of Toronto Scarborough; Centennial College; Scarborough Centre; North York; Richmond Hill Centre; Highway 407; Bramalea GO; Square One	Weekdays
Hamilton/Pickering	41G	Centennial College; Scarborough Centre; North York; Richmond Hill Centre; Highway 407; Bramalea GO; Square One; Erin Mills; Oakville Carpool; Bronte Carpool; Burlington P&R; McMaster University; Hamilton GO	Weekdays
Hamilton/Pickering	47	Highway 407; Bramalea GO; Square One; Erin Mills; Oakville Carpool; Bronte Carpool; Burlington Carpool; McMaster University; Hamilton GO	
Hamilton/Pickering	47A	Square One; Hamilton GO	Weekday express
Hamilton/Pickering	47D	Highway 407; Bramalea GO; Square One; McMaster University	Weekday express
Hamilton/Pickering	47G	Erin Mills; Bronte Carpool; Burlington Carpool; McMaster University	Weekdays
Hamilton/Pickering	47W	Canada's Wonderland; Highway 407; Bramalea GO; Square One; Erin Mills; Oakville Carpool; Bronte Carpool; Burlington Carpool; McMaster University; Hamilton GO	Summer weekends
Hamilton/Pickering	48	Highway 407; Bramalea GO; Hurontario & 407 P&R; Meadowvale GO; Meadowvale Town Centre; Aberfoyle P&R; University of Guelph	Weekdays
Oshawa/Oakville	52	Oshawa GO Station; Oshawa; Ontario Tech; Brooklin Carpool; Brougham Carpool; Cornell; Unionville GO; Richmond Hill Centre; Highway 407	Weekends
Oshawa/Oakville	52A	Oshawa GO Station; Oshawa; Ontario Tech; Cornell; Unionville GO; Richmond Hill Centre; Highway 407	Weekday limited express
Oshawa/Oakville	52X	Oshawa GO Station; Oshawa; Ontario Tech; Brooklin Carpool; Brougham Carpool; Cornell; Unionville GO; Richmond Hill Centre; Highway 407; Canada's Wonderland	Summer Weekends
Oshawa/Oakville	56	Oshawa GO Station; Oshawa; Ontario Tech; Brooklin Carpool; Brougham Carpool; Cornell; Unionville GO; Richmond Hill Centre; Highway 407; Bramalea GO; Square One; Erin Mills; Oakville Carpool; Sheridan College; Oakville GO	Weekdays
Oshawa/Oakville	56A	Oshawa GO Station; Oshawa; Ontario Tech; Unionville GO; Highway 407; Bramalea GO; Square One	Seasonal weekday express
Oshawa/Oakville	56B	Highway 407; Bramalea GO; Square One; Erin Mills; Oakville Carpool; Sheridan College; Oakville GO	Seasonal weekdays
Oshawa/Oakville	56C	Unionville GO; Richmond Hill Centre; Highway 407; Bramalea GO; Square One; Erin Mills; Oakville Carpool; Sheridan College; Oakville GO	Seasonal weekdays northbound
Pickering/Mississauga	94	Pickering; Scarborough Centre; Sheppard–Yonge; Yorkdale; Keele & Highway 401; Pearson; Renforth; Dixie; Square One	24hr service

=== Richmond Hill corridor ===
Route		Major stops	Notes
Richmond Hill	61	Union; Langstaff GO; Richmond Hill GO; Gormley GO; Bloomington GO	Weekdays

=== Barrie corridor ===
Route		Major stops	Notes
Barrie	65	Union; Aurora Carpool; Aurora GO; Newmarket GO; East Gwillimbury GO	
Barrie	65A	Union; Rutherford GO; Maple GO; King City GO	Weekday Southbound
Barrie	65C	Union; Aurora Carpool; Aurora GO	
Barrie	65E	Union; Rutherford GO; Maple GO; King City GO; Aurora GO; Newmarket GO; East Gwillimbury GO	
Keswick/North York	67	Finch; Sheppard–Yonge; Richmond Hill Carpool; Aurora Carpool; Davis Drive Carpool; Queensville Carpool; Woodbine Carpool	Weekdays
Barrie	68	Aurora GO; Newmarket GO; East Gwillimbury GO; Holland Landing; Bradford GO; Bradford; Churchill; Stroud; Barrie South GO; Allandale Waterfront GO	
Barrie	68B	East Gwillimbury GO; Holland Landing; Bradford GO; Bradford; Churchill; Stroud; Barrie South GO; Allandale Waterfront GO	
Barrie	68E	Aurora GO; Newmarket GO; East Gwillimbury GO	Weekday northbound

=== Stouffville corridor ===
Route		Major stops	Notes
Stouffville			
Stouffville	70	Unionville GO; Centennial GO; Markham GO; Mount Joy GO; Stouffville GO; Old Elm GO; Goodwood; Uxbridge	Weekday limited southbound
Stouffville	70B	Old Elm GO; Goodwood; Uxbridge	
Stouffville	70D	Mount Joy GO; Stouffville GO; Old Elm GO; Goodwood; Uxbridge	
Stouffville	71	Union; Unionville GO; Centennial GO; Markham GO; Mount Joy GO; Stouffville GO; Old Elm GO; Goodwood; Uxbridge	
Stouffville	71C	Union; Unionville GO; Centennial GO; Markham GO; Mount Joy GO; Stouffville GO; Old Elm GO	
Stouffville	71E	Union; Unionville GO; Centennial GO; Markham GO; Mount Joy GO	Weekday limited southbound

=== Lakeshore East corridor ===
Route		Major stops	Notes
Peterborough/Oshawa	88	Oshawa GO; Newcastle Carpool; Clarington North Carpool; Cavan/Millbrook Carpool; Peterborough South Carpool; Peterborough Bus Terminal; Trent University	
Peterborough/Oshawa	88B	Oshawa GO; Ritson P&R; Courtice P&R; Newcastle Carpool; Clarington North Carpool; Cavan/Millbrook Carpool; Peterborough South Carpool; Peterborough Bus Terminal; Trent University	Weekdays
Peterborough/Oshawa	88C	Oshawa GO; Peterborough Bus Terminal; Trent University	Express
Lakeshore East	90B	Union; Pickering GO; Ajax GO; Whitby GO; Oshawa GO	Late evening and early morning
Oshawa/Yorkdale	92	Yorkdale; York Mills; Scarborough Centre; North Rouge; Pickering; Ajax; Whitby; Oshawa Bus Terminal; Oshawa GO	
Oshawa/Yorkdale	92A	Yorkdale; York Mills; Scarborough Centre; North Rouge; Pickering; Ajax; Dundas St. & Hwy. 412 P&R	Weekdays
Oshawa/Finch	96B	Finch; Sheppard–Yonge; Scarborough Centre; Ajax GO; Whitby GO; Oshawa GO	
Oshawa/Finch	96Z	Finch; Sheppard–Yonge; Scarborough Centre; Toronto Zoo; Ajax GO; Whitby GO; Oshawa GO	Summer weekends

== Terminals, stations and carpool/park and ride lots ==
Bus Terminals, Stations and Carpool/Park and Ride Lots Served by GO Transit
Name	Type	Parking	Location	Coordinates	Notes
Aberfoyle	Park & Ride	202	Brock Road South at McLean Road, Puslinch	43°27′40″N 80°08′07″W	
Aurora	MTO Carpool	176	Highway 404 at Aurora Road, Aurora	44°00′49″N 79°24′26″W	
Beamsville	MTO Carpool	119	QEW at Ontario Street, Beamsville	43°11′18″N 79°28′34″W	
Bolton	Park & Ride	10	Highway 50 at Wilton Drive, Bolton	43°52′19″N 79°43′40″W	
Bolton South	Park & Ride	204	Highway 50 at Mayfield Road, Bolton	43°50′48″N 79°41′50″W	
Bowmanville	Park & Ride	85	74 Prince William Boulevard, Bowmanville	43°54′27″N 78°42′13″W	Future Bowmanville GO Station
Bramalea	Terminal	0	160 Central Park Drive, Brampton	43°43′08″N 79°43′14″W	
Brampton	Terminal	0	8 Nelson Street West, Brampton	43°24′41″N 79°27′16″W	
Brantford	Terminal	0	64 Darling Street, Brantford	43°08′25″N 80°15′54″W	
Bronte	MTO Carpool	84	Highway 407 at Bronte Road, Oakville	43°26′46″N 79°47′30″W	
Brooklin	Park & Ride	300	Highway 407 at Baldwin Street, Brooklin	43°56′40″N 78°57′36″W	
Brougham	MTO Carpool	327	Highway 407 at Brock Road, Brougham	43°54′52″N 79°06′16″W	
Burlington	MTO Carpool	105	Highway 407 at Dundas Street, Burlington	43°23′20″N 79°49′43″W	
Caledon	MTO Carpool	40	Highway 10 at Travelled Road, Caledon	43°51′38″N 79°59′45″W	
Cavan	MTO Carpool	115	Highway 115 at County Road 10, Cavan Monaghan	44°11′12″N 78°27′53″W	
Clarington North	MTO Carpool	42	Highway 35 at Highway 115, Clarington	44°03′50″N 78°37′33″W	
Courtice	Park & Ride	109	Courtice Road at Baseline Road Courtice	43°53′15″N 78°46′06″W	
Davis Drive	MTO Carpool	118	Highway 404 at Davis Drive, Newmarket	44°04′03″N 79°25′17″W	
Dixie	Station	170	4440 Dixie Road, Mississauga	43°37′49″N 79°36′52″W	
Dundas Street	Park & Ride	193	Dundas Street at Highway 412 Whitby	43°52′37″N 78°58′51″W	
Erin Mills	Station	300	4430 Erin Mills Parkway, Mississauga	43°33′08″N 79°42′02″W	
Finch	Terminal	0	5697 Yonge Street, Toronto	43°46′56″N 79°24′56″W	
Grimsby	MTO Carpool	202	South Service Road at Casablanca Boulevard, Grimsby	43°12′18″N 79°35′46″W	Future Grimsby GO Station
Hurontario & 407	Park & Ride	96	Highway 407 at Hurontario Street, Mississauga	43°39′08″N 79°42′38″W	Shown as "Hwy. 10 and 407" on signage
Maple	MTO Carpool	170	3401 Major Mackenzie Drive West, Vaughan	43°50′49″N 79°32′55″W	
McMaster University	Terminal	0	McMaster University, Hamilton	43°15′42″N 79°55′22″W	
Milton	MTO Carpool	157	Highway 401 at Highway 25, Milton	43°31′38″N 79°54′14″W	
Newcastle	MTO Carpool	152	Highway 35/115 at Highway 2, Newcastle	43°54′46″N 78°36′45″W	
Newmarket	Terminal	351	320 Eagle Street West, Newmarket	44°03′10″N 79°29′11″W	Service ended as of January 3, 2026.
Newmarket	MTO Carpool	312	Highway 400 at Highway 9, Newmarket	44°01′44″N 79°35′42″W	Service ended as of January 3, 2026.
Niagara Falls	Terminal	0	4555 Erie Avenue, Niagara Falls	43°06′30″N 79°03′49″W	
Niagara Falls	Park & Ride	45	Highway 420 at Stanley Avenue, Niagara Falls	43°05′47″N 79°05′05″W	Parking at 5451 Stamford Street
Oakville	MTO Carpool	375	Highway 407 at Trafalgar Road, Oakville	43°30′23″N 79°44′45″W	
Orangeville	MTO Carpool	55	Broadway at Highway 10	43°55′18.8″N 80°04′58.8″W	
Orangeville	Park & Ride	51	49 Town Line, Orangeville	43°54′48″N 80°05′24″W	
Oshawa	Terminal	0	47 Bond Street West, Oshawa	43°53′52″N 78°51′56″W	Closed as of September 5, 2020.
Peterborough Central	Terminal	0	190 Simcoe Street, Peterborough	44°18′17″N 78°19′22″W	
Peterborough South	MTO Carpool	150	Fisher Drive (Formerly: Crawford Drive) at Harper Road, Peterborough	44°16′04″N 78°20′57″W	
Queensville	MTO Carpool	210	Highway 404 at Queensville Sideroad, East Gwillimbury	44°08′31″N 79°26′26″W	
Renforth	Station	0	5001 Commerce Boulevard, Mississauga	43°39′47″N 79°35′28″W	
Richmond Hill	MTO Carpool	237	Highway 404 at Major Mackenzie Drive East, Richmond Hill, Ontario	43°52′51″N 79°22′48″W	
Richmond Hill	Terminal	0	8675 Yonge Street, Richmond Hill	43°50′24″N 79°25′31″W	
Ritson	Park & Ride	68	First Ave at Front Street Oshawa	43°53′06″N 78°51′17″W	
Scarborough	Terminal	0	300 Borough Drive, Toronto	43°31′47″N 80°13′32″W	
Sportsworld	Park & Ride	125	65 Sportsworld Crossing Road, Kitchener	43°24′35″N 80°23′35″W	
Square One	Terminal	193	210 Centre View Drive, Mississauga	43°35′41″N 79°38′51″W	
Trent University	Terminal	0	1600 W Bank Drive, Peterborough	43°21′21″N 78°17′12″W	
Union	Terminal	0	81 Bay Street, Toronto	43°38′39″N 79°22′40″W	
University of Guelph	Terminal	0	50 Stone Road East, Guelph	43°31′47″N 80°13′32″W	
University of Toronto Scarborough	Terminal	0	1265 Military Trail, Toronto	43°47′03″N 79°11′12″W	
University of Waterloo	Terminal	0	200 University Avenue, Waterloo	43°28′23″N 80°32′28″W	
Williams Parkway	MTO Carpool	75	Highway 410 at Williams Parkway, Brampton	43°42′59″N 79°45′04″W	
Winston Churchill	Station	300	4310 Winston Churchill Boulevard, Mississauga	43°32′30″N 79°42′46″W	
Woodbine	MTO Carpool	73	Highway 404 at Woodbine Avenue, East Gwillimbury	44°11′30″N 79°26′14″W	
Yorkdale	Terminal	0	1 Yorkdale Road, Toronto	43°43′32″N 79°26′52″W	
York Mills	Terminal	0	4023 Yonge Street, Toronto	43°44′41″N 79°24′25″W	

== Maintenance facilities ==
GO buses are maintained at 5 facilities:

- Brampton Garage (85 Van Kirk Drive)
- Halton Hills Garage (19 Mansewood Court, Acton)
- Oshawa Garage (1002 Thornton Road South - Boundary Road and Wentworth Street)
- Steeprock (200 Steeprock Drive, North York)
- Streetsville

== See also ==
- GO Transit fleet
- History of GO Transit
