= University of Waterloo station =

Light rail station and bus terminal in Waterloo, Ontario

University of Waterloo
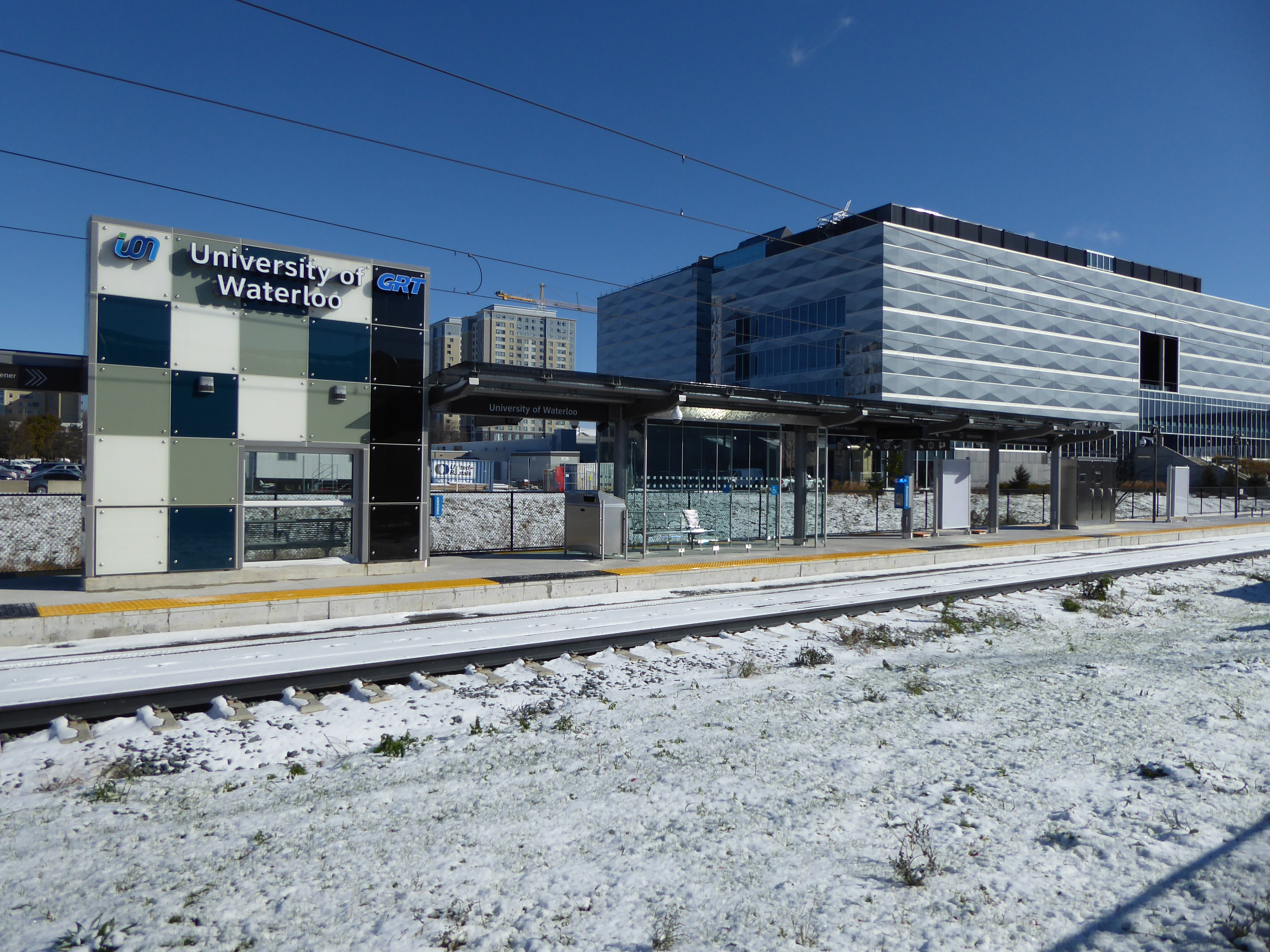
- Station structurally complete, November 2017

General information
- Other names: University of Waterloo Terminal
- Location: University of Waterloo; Waterloo, Ontario; Canada
- Coordinates: 43.47312°N 80.54107°W
- Platforms: Centre platform (Rail Platforms 1/2)
- Tracks: 2
- Train operators: Grand River Transit
- Bus routes: GRT buses: 9 Lakeshore; 13 Laurelwood; 19 Hazel; 30 Ring Road; 31 Columbia; 201 iXpress Fischer-Hallman; GO buses: 17 Waterloo / Hamilton; 25 Waterloo / Mississauga; 30 Kitchener
- Bus stands: 5 (Platforms 3-7)
- Bus operators: Grand River Transit; GO Transit
- Connections: Laurel Trail / Trans Canada Trail

History
- Opened: 2019 (Light Rail Platform); 2022 (Bus Platforms)

Services
Preceding station	Grand River Transit	Following station
Research and Technology toward Conestoga	Ion	Laurier–Waterloo Park toward Fairway
Location

University of Waterloo (also known as University of Waterloo Terminal) is a bus terminal and light rail station located at the University of Waterloo in Waterloo, Ontario, Canada. The site initially opened as a light rail station on Grand River Transit's ION light rail line in 2019, and the bus terminal for GRT buses was subsequently opened in 2022. The bus terminal is shared with GO Transit, which uses the easternmost eastbound platforms as its University of Waterloo Terminal for its intercity bus service.

== History ==
Before construction of the light rail station, GRT and intercity bus services had been slowly intensifying at a set of stops along the east end of the University of Waterloo's Ring Road near the Davis Centre building, most significantly Grand River Transit (including the 200 iXpress bus which was the predecessor of the Ion light rail system), GO Transit's 25 Waterloo–Mississauga intercity bus route, and the Waterloo Undergraduate Student Association's Fed Bus service. Half of the bus slips and shelters on Ring Road were removed during the construction of the Light Rail line, but the other half on the west side remain, used only by the Fed Bus service.

In 2016, with light rail infrastructure under construction, an adjacent dedicated bus station was announced. It would be east of the rail line and accessed from Phillip Street, shifting some buses off Ring Road and onto public roadways. Later, in 2020, it was announced that over $3 million in additional provincial, federal, and regional funding had been granted for amenities at the new bus station. This would include several heated waiting shelters and bike storage facilities.

The bus terminal partially opened on January 3, 2022, and then fully opened three weeks later, serving Grand River Transit routes; GO Transit buses switched over on March 15.

== Overview ==
Located on the campus of the University of Waterloo, the station primarily serves students and employees of the university. The main campus is on the west side of the station, with three engineering buildings to the south and administration buildings to the north.

The bus terminal was constructed on an existing access road between Phillip Street on the east and the University's Ring Road on the west, with a level crossing for the ION light rail line and the Laurel Trail at its western end. The Bus Terminal's road continues westward onto the campus grounds as William Tutte Way, named after University of Waterloo mathematician W.T. Tutte.

=== Freight Train Usage ===
From 11 PM-5 AM, freight trains are permitted to use the tracks used by the light rail line, as the line was built along a portion of track shared with the Waterloo Spur Line, which serves industrial locations in Elmira. To protect the station structure (and the trains themselves), a gauntlet track is in place alongside Platform 1 of the station that offsets the freight track a small distance.

== Services ==
=== Grand River Transit ===
Light Rail

Platform	Route	Name	Notes
1	301	ION Express	Northbound to Conestoga Station
2	301	ION Express	Southbound to Fairway Station

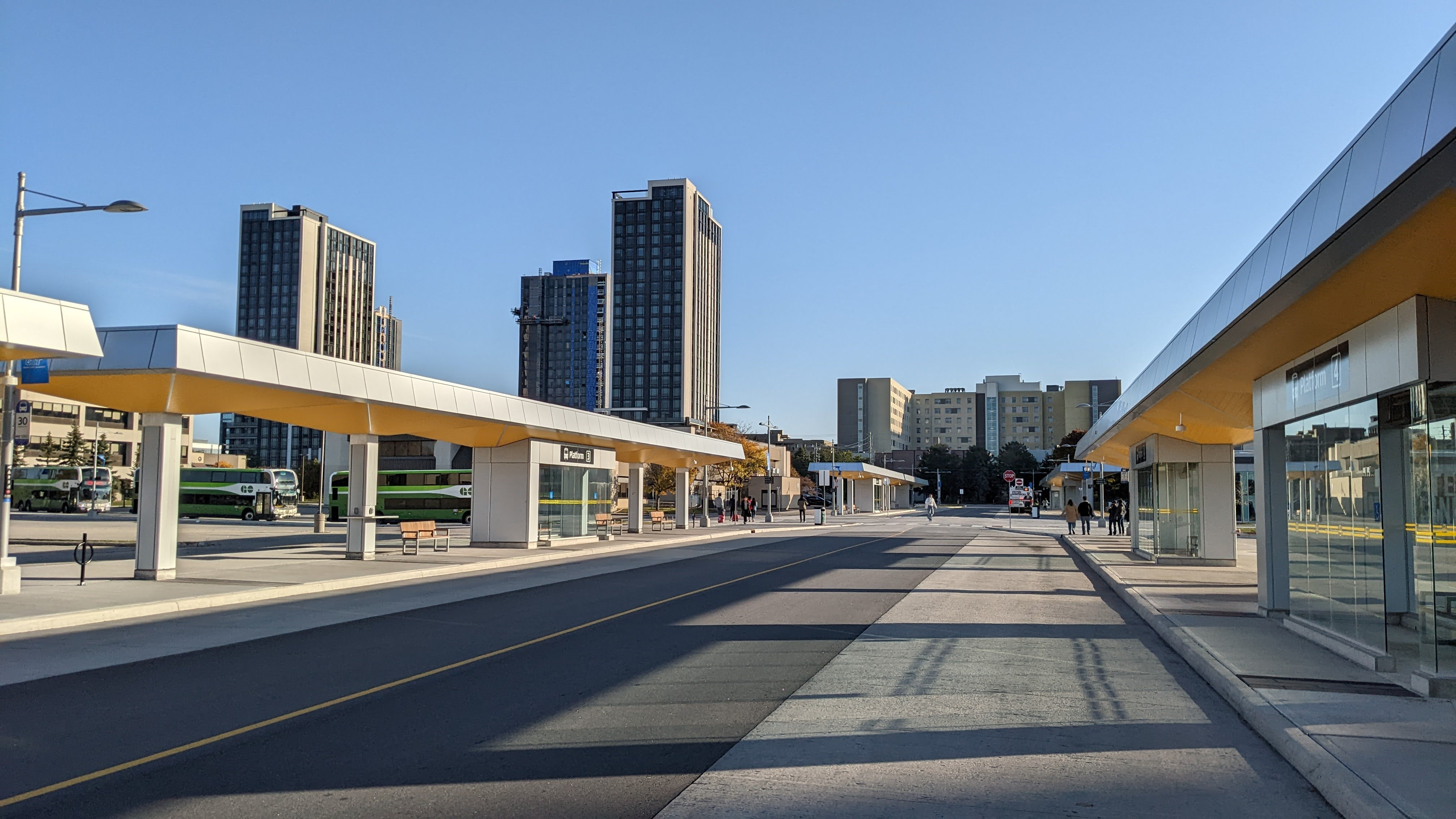
The bus platforms in October 2022

Buses

Platform	Route	Name	Notes
3	30	Ring Road	To University of Waterloo Station Via Ring Road
3	31	Columbia	Eastbound to Columbia/Sundew
4	31	Columbia	Westbound to Conestoga Station
3	201	iXpress Fischer Hallman	Eastbound to Conestoga College
4	201	iXpress Fischer Hallman	Westbound to Conestoga Station
4	19	Hazel	19A to St. Jacob's Market
4	19	Hazel	19B to Northfield station (Waterloo)
5	301R	ION Replacement Shuttle	Rail replacement bus service during 301 service disruptions.
6	9	Lakeshore	To Conestoga Station
6	13	Laurelwood	To The Boardwalk Station

=== GO Transit ===
All GO Transit buses load at Platform 6 and unload at Platform 7.

Platform	Route	Name	Notes
6C	17	Waterloo / Hamilton	To Hamilton GO Centre via: Wilfrid Laurier University; Guelph Central Station; University of Guelph; Aldershot GO Station; McMaster University
6C	17B	Waterloo / Hamilton	To Burlington GO via: Wilfrid Laurier University; Kitchener GO
6B	25	Waterloo / Mississauga	To Square One GO Terminal via: Wilfrid Laurier University; Cambridge Smartcentre; Milton Carpool; Winston Churchill Transitway Station; Erin Mills Transitway Station
6B	25A	Waterloo / Mississauga	To Square One GO Terminal via: Wilfrid Laurier University; Milton Carpool
6B	25C	Waterloo / Mississauga	To Square One GO Terminal via: Wilfrid Laurier University
6B	25K	Waterloo / Mississauga	To Kipling GO via: Wilfrid Laurier University; Cambridge Smartcentre; Milton Carpool; Toronto Premium Outlets; Winston Churchill Transitway Station; Erin Mills Transitway Station; Square One GO Terminal; Dixie Transitway Station; Renforth Transitway Station
6B	25L	Waterloo / Mississauga	To Square One GO Terminal via: Wilfrid Laurier University; Cambridge Smartcentre; Milton Carpool; Toronto Premium Outlets; Winston Churchill Transitway Station; Erin Mills Transitway Station
6A	30	Kitchener	To Highway 407 via: Bramalea GO Station; Meadowvale Business Park; Kitchener GO station; Wilfrid Laurier University
6A	30A	Kitchener	To Bramalea GO Station via: Kitchener GO station; Wilfrid Laurier University
6A	30E	Kitchener	To Bramalea GO Station via: Wilfrid Laurier University
6A	30F	Kitchener	To Highway 407 via: Bramalea GO Station; Wilfrid Laurier University
6A	30G	Kitchener	To Highway 407 via: Bramalea GO Station; Meadowvale Business Park; Wilfrid Laurier University
