= Centennial GO Station =

Railway station in Markham, Ontario, Canada

Centennial
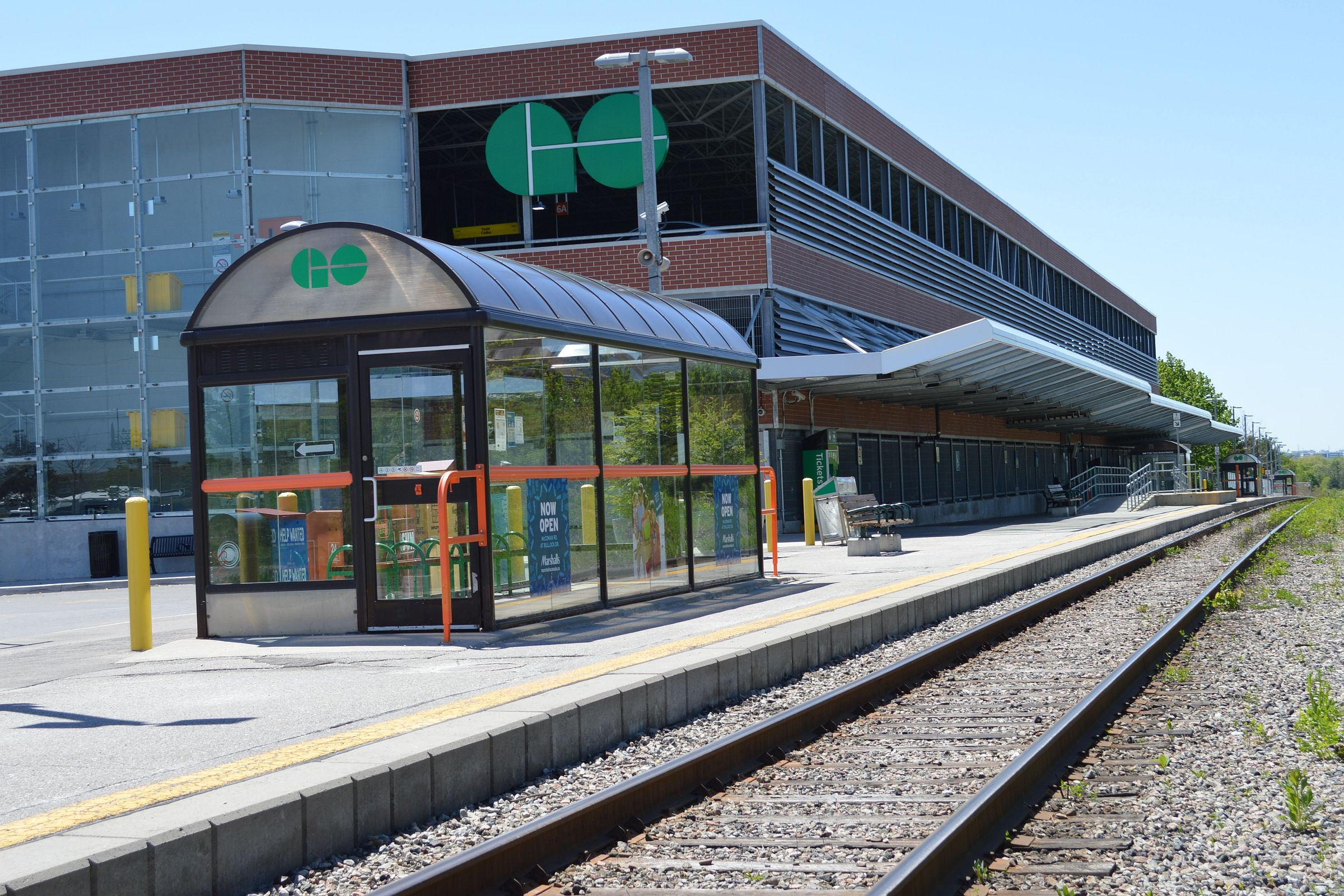
- Centennial GO Station in 2013

General information
- Location: 320 Bullock Drive; Markham, Ontario; Canada
- Coordinates: 43°52′25″N 79°17′21″W
- Owner: Metrolinx
- Platforms: 1 side platform
- Tracks: 1
- Bus routes: 70 71
- Connections: 129A TTC; York Region Transit

Construction
- Parking: 451 spaces + 2 electric vehicle parking/charging stations
- Cycle facilities: Yes
- Accessible: Yes

Other information
- Station code: GO Transit: CE
- Fare zone: 72

History
- Opened: September 2002

Passengers
- 2018: 177,000

Services
Preceding station	GO Transit	Following station
Unionville towards Union	Stouffville	Markham towards Old Elm
Location

Centennial GO Station is a train station on the GO Transit Stouffville line in Markham, Ontario, Canada. The station is located directly west of McCowan Road and north of Bullock Drive, near the Markham Centennial Park.

== History ==
The station opened in 2002 and was never a stop by previous line operators (Toronto and Nipissing Railway, Grand Trunk Railway and Canadian National Railway).

== Services ==
The parking structure acts as station with awnings covering part of the platform. Washrooms are founded at the adjacent community centre.

Centennial Station does not have a bus terminal. Connecting bus services serve on-street stops adjacent to the station at Bullock Drive and McCowan Road.

=== GO Transit ===
- Stouffville line GO trains service Centennial Station going southbound to Union Station and northbound to Old Elm. At times when Stouffville line GO trains are not operating, service is provided by GO bus route 71, which also continues beyond Old Elm to Uxbridge station.
- Route 54, a GO Transit bus, serves this station. This bus operates between Mount Joy Station and the bus terminal at Highway 407 station via Highway 407.

=== Toronto Transit Commission ===
129A McCowan North serves the station. There are northbound buses to Major Mackenzie Drive and southbound buses to Kennedy station via Scarborough Centre station. This route is operated by the TTC on behalf of York Region Transit. Despite this being a TTC bus, a YRT fare is charged when boarding north of Steeles Avenue.

=== York Region Transit ===
- 40 Unionville Local (rush hour only)
- 301 Markham Express (rush hour only)
