= Lincolnville =

Lincolnville may refer to:

== Places ==
Canada

- Lincolnville, York Region, Ontario, a community in the town of Whitchurch-Stouffville
- Lincolnville, Nova Scotia

United States

- Lincolnville Historic District, a U.S. Historic District located in St. Augustine, Florida
- Lincolnville, Indiana
- Lincolnville, Kansas
- Lincolnville, Maine
- Lincolnville, Pennsylvania
- Lincolnville, South Carolina

Australia

- a neighbourhood with a closed post office within the Melbourne suburb of Keilor East, Victoria
