= McMaster University Bus Terminal =

Bus terminal in Hamilton, Ontario, Canada

McMaster University

General information
- Location: McMaster University; Hamilton, Ontario; Canada
- Coordinates: 43°15′42″N 79°55′22″W
- Platforms: 5
- Bus routes: 15 17 41 47
- Connections: Hamilton Street Railway (nearby at Main Street or University Avenue)

Construction
- Structure type: None
- Parking: No
- Cycle facilities: Yes; Behind shelter for Platform 4
- Accessible: Yes

Other information
- Station code: GO Transit: MCUV
- Fare zone: 18

History
- Opened: April 5, 2007; 19 years ago
Location

McMaster University is a bus terminal located at McMaster University in Hamilton, Ontario, Canada. The terminal is situated between the Mary E. Keyes Residence and H. G. Thode Library. GO Transit exclusively uses the terminal, while Hamilton Street Railway provides connecting routes. The terminal opened on April 5, 2007, with full accessibility and includes five bus bays, three heated shelters, and large platforms.

== Services ==
=== GO Transit ===
Platform assignments

- 1 - Hamilton GO Centre (westbound route 47)
- 2 - Aldershot "train meet" connection (route 15/15A eastbound) to Lakeshore West GO Train service
- 2 - Brantford "train meet" connection (route 15 westbound)
- 3 - Route 47F to Highway 407 Bus Terminal
- 4 - Square One/Bramalea Express (routes 47A & 47B)
- 5 - Hwy 407 to Highway 407 Bus Terminal (eastbound route 47)

=== Hamilton Street Railway ===
Hamilton Street Railway (HSR) has several local bus routes that operate through the campus or on Main Street:

- 1/1A - King
- 5/52 - Delaware
- 10 - B line Express
- 51 - University (no Sunday or holiday service)
