= Markham GO Station =

Railway station in Markham, Ontario, Canada

Markham
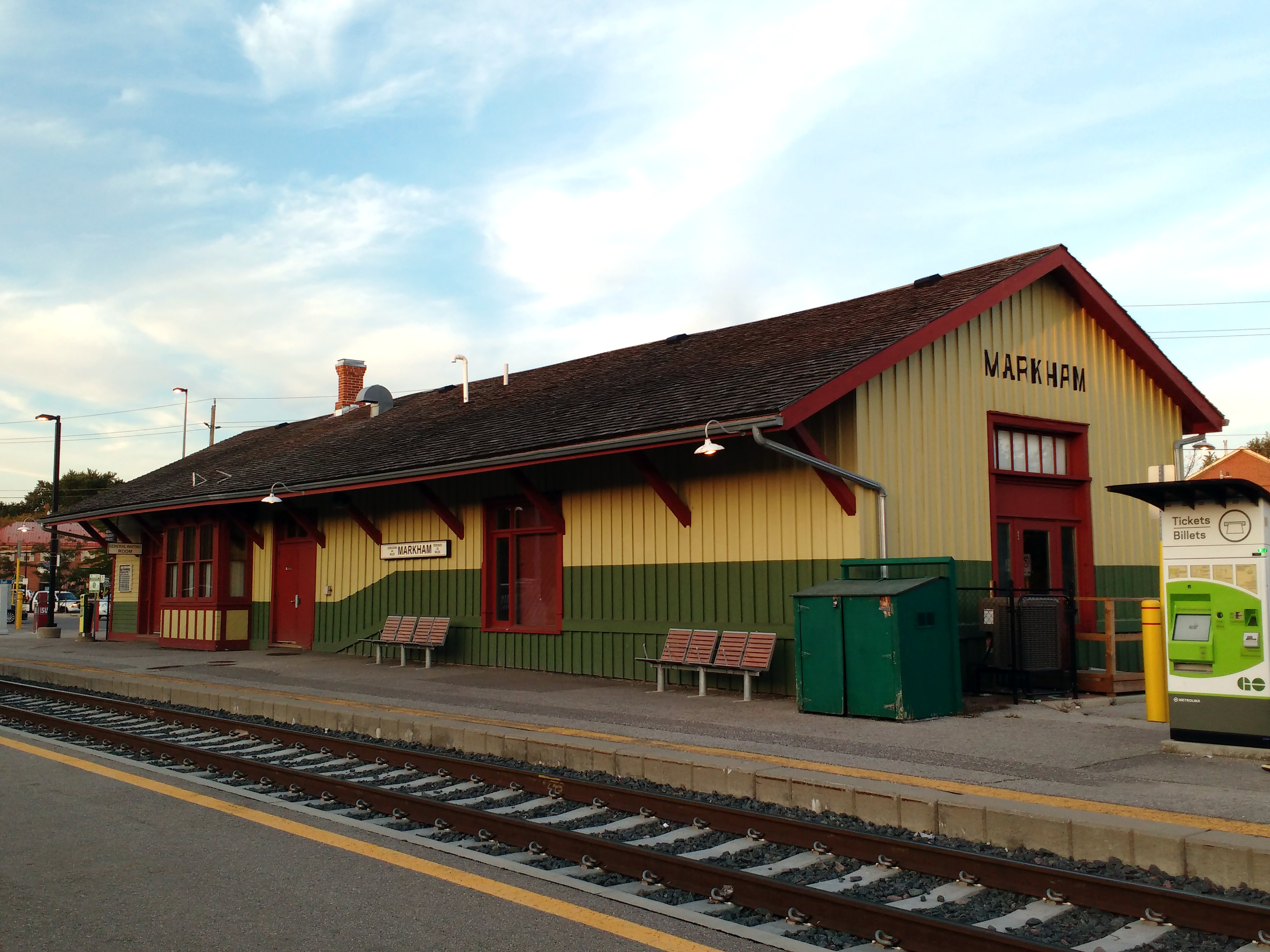
- Station building and platform in 2017

General information
- Location: 214 Main Street North; Markham, Ontario; Canada
- Coordinates: 43°52′58″N 79°15′45″W
- Platforms: 2 side platforms
- Tracks: 1
- Bus routes: 70 71
- Connections: TTC buses: 102D; York Region Transit

Construction
- Structure type: Station building with public washroom and waiting room
- Parking: 413 spaces
- Cycle facilities: Yes
- Accessible: Yes

Other information
- Station code: GO Transit: MR
- Fare zone: 72

History
- Opened: 1871 (T&NR); September 7, 1982 (GO Transit)

Passengers
- 2018: 155,000

Services
Preceding station	GO Transit	Following station
Centennial towards Union	Stouffville	Mount Joy towards Old Elm
Former services
Preceding station	Canadian National Railway	Following station
Unionville toward Toronto	Toronto – Belleville via Peterboro	Stouffville toward Belleville
Unionville toward Toronto	Toronto – Port Hope via Peterboro	Stouffville toward Port Hope

Heritage Railway Station (Canada)
- Designated: 1992
- Reference no.: 6762
Location

Markham GO Station is a railway station on GO Transit's Stouffville line, located on Markham Main Street North in Markham, Ontario, Canada.

== History ==
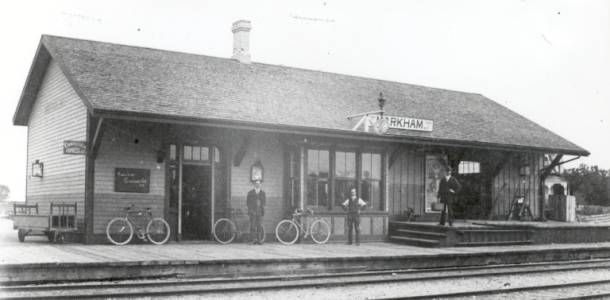
Toronto and Nipissing Station, c.1900

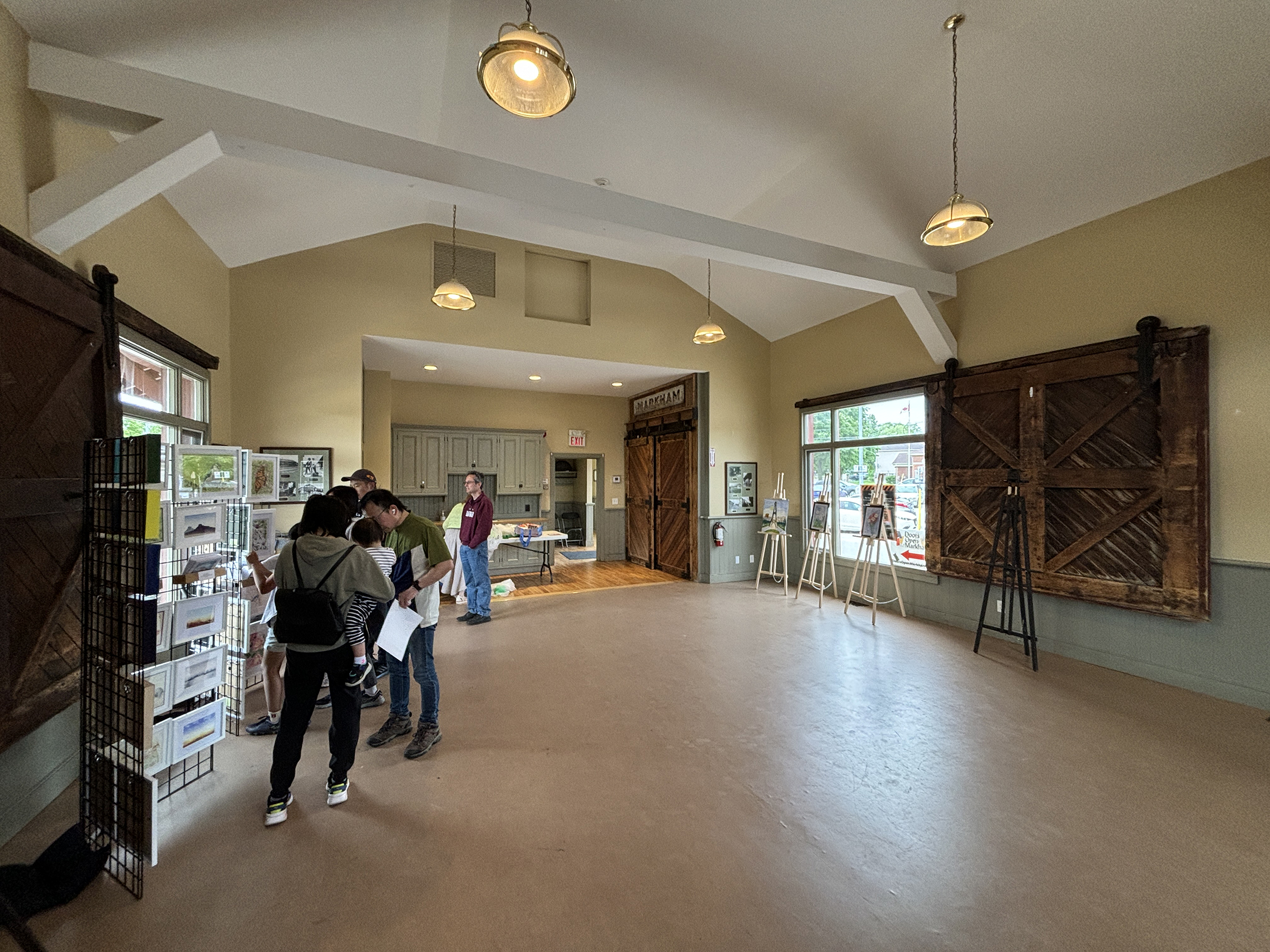
Mingay Room

The station was built in 1871 by the Toronto and Nipissing Railway, which was taken over by the Grand Trunk Railway, which ultimately became part of the Canadian National Railway in 1923. It has been designated as a heritage railway station by the Historic Sites and Monuments Board of Canada.

The station design is based on a classic Canadian Railway Style with elements of the Vernacular-Carpenter Gothic architecture of the mid-19th century in Ontario. while the station uses a gable roof, the enclosed platform shelter have Dutch gable roof design.

The city of Markham purchased the building as a Millennium project and are undertaking its restoration in conjunction with the Markham Village Conservancy, which manages the station. In addition to facilities for GO Transit, the building is used as a community centre, with two rooms that have a capacity of 30 and 100 people, respectively, which are available for rental.

== Services ==
Markham Station does not have a bus terminal. Connecting bus services serve on-street stops in front of the station on Markham Main Street.

=== GO Transit ===
- On weekdays, Stouffville line train service to Markham Station consists of 9 trains southbound to Union Station in the morning and 9 trains northbound to Lincolnville in the afternoon or late evening. Service at other times and in other directions is provided by GO bus route 71, which continues beyond Lincolnville to Uxbridge station.
- Route 54 (Hwy 407 East GO Bus) operates between Mount Joy and Highway 407 Bus Terminal.

=== York Region Transit ===
- 301 Markham Express (rush hour only)

=== Toronto Transit Commission ===
- 102D Markham Road northbound to Major Mackenzie Drive and southbound Warden Subway Station (second longest bus route after 54 Lawrence East).

== See also ==
- York Region Transit
- Toronto Transit Commission
- List of designated heritage railway stations of Canada
