= Mount Joy GO Station =

Railway station in Markham, Ontario, Canada

Mount Joy
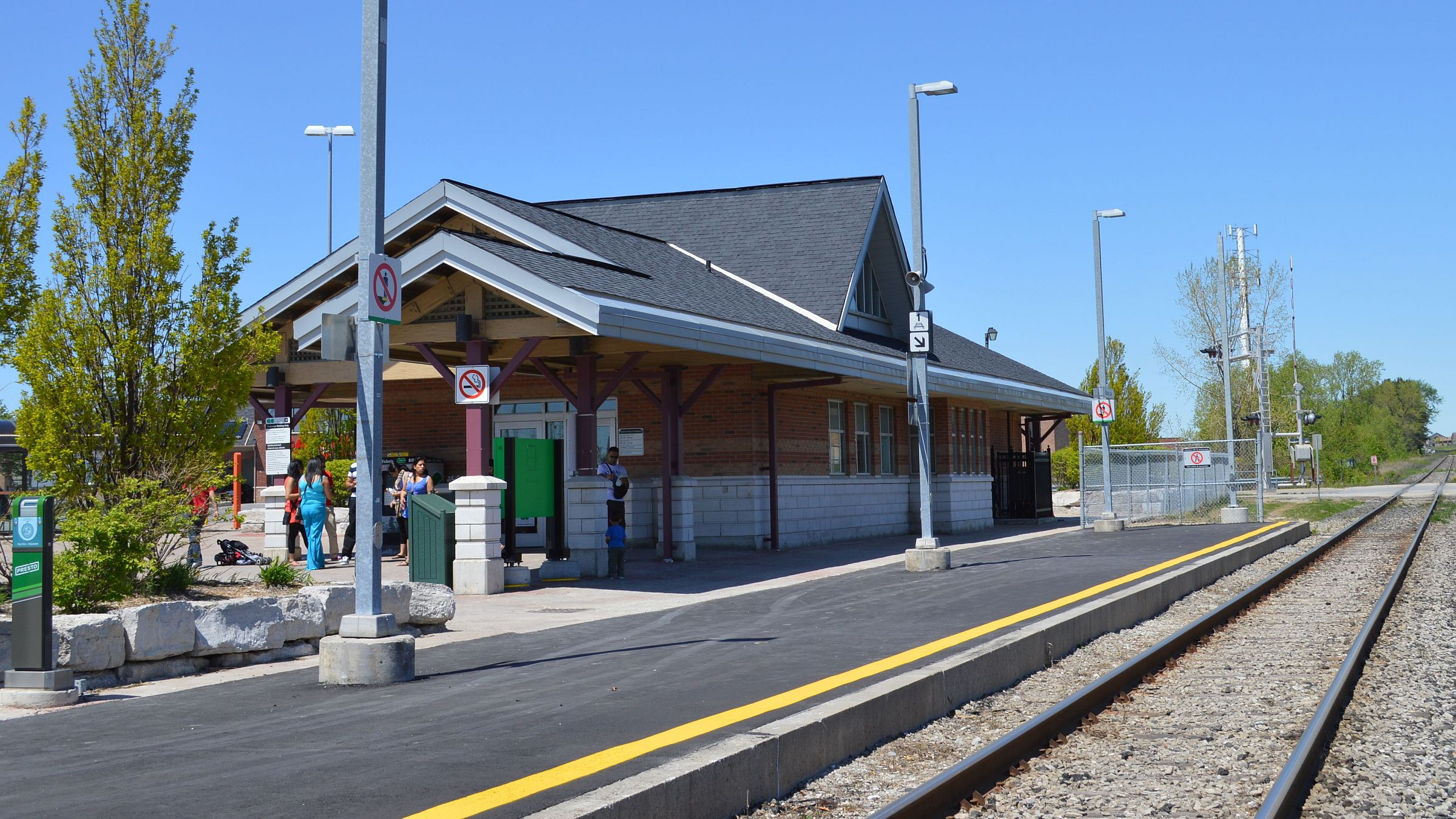
- Station building and platform in 2013

General information
- Location: 1801 Bur Oak Avenue; Markham, Ontario; Canada
- Coordinates: 43°54′02″N 79°15′47″W
- Owner: Metrolinx
- Platforms: 1 side platform
- Tracks: 1
- Bus routes: 70 71
- Connections: York Region Transit; 102D TTC

Construction
- Structure type: Station building with assessable washrooms and waiting area; standalone enclosed shelters along platform and bus loop
- Parking: 1333 spaces
- Cycle facilities: Yes (partially enclosed structures with racks)
- Accessible: Yes

Other information
- Station code: GO Transit: MJ
- Fare zone: 73

History
- Opened: December 2002; 23 years ago

Passengers
- 2018: 310,000

Services
Preceding station	GO Transit	Following station
Markham towards Union	Stouffville	Stouffville towards Old Elm
Location

Mount Joy GO Station is a railway station and bus station in the GO Transit network located in the City of Markham, Ontario, Canada. It is located in the community of Mount Joy, north of the old town of Markham, at the intersection of Markham Road and Bur Oak Avenue and is a stop on the Stouffville line train service. It is also the northern terminus of most of the Stouffville line's off-peak train services.

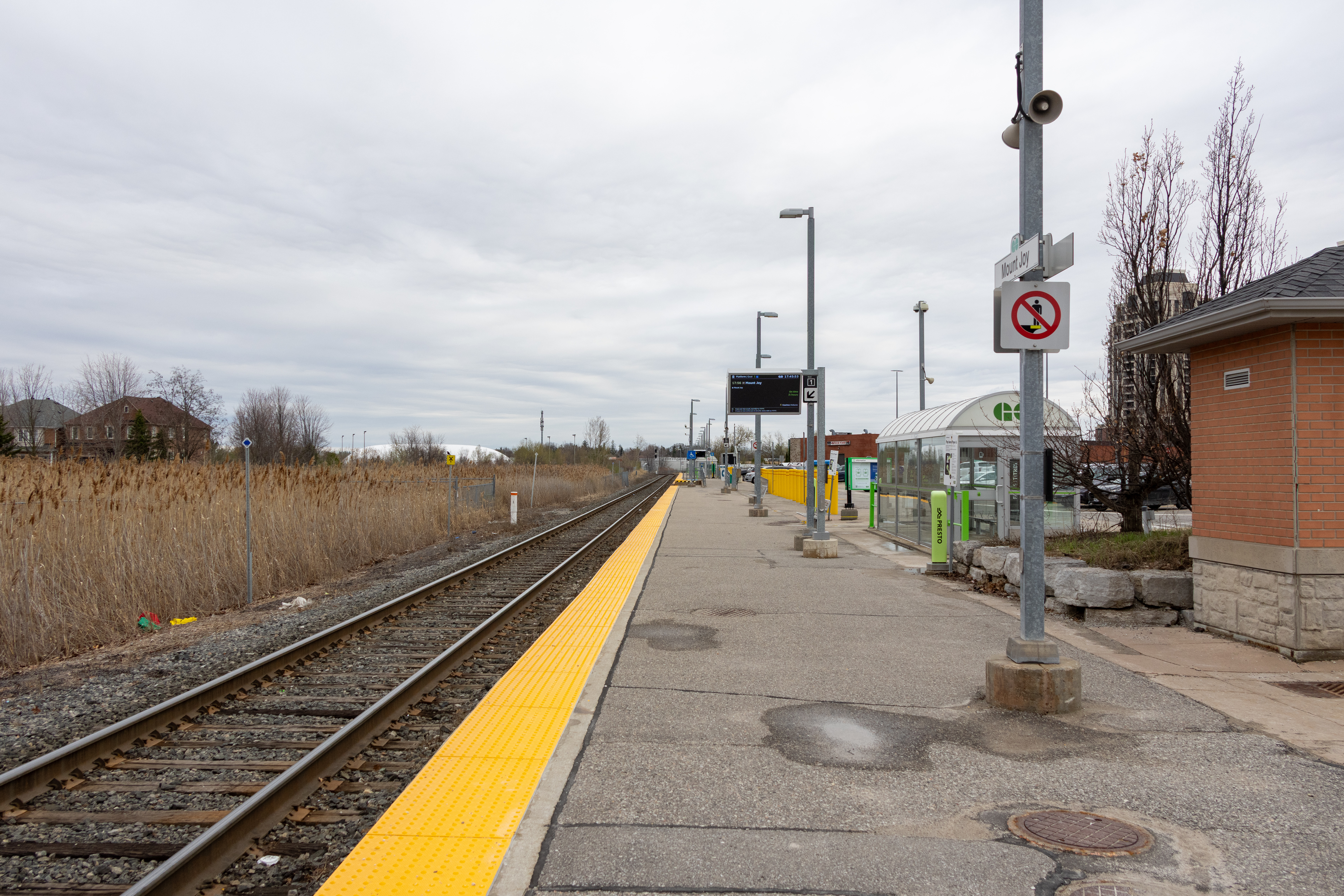
Station platform in 2026

== Connecting transit ==
=== GO Transit ===
- York University GO Bus Service; Eastern Terminus of Route 54 (Highway 407 East Service, Markham-Hwy 407 Bus Terminal branch)
- Routes 70 and 71 (Stouffville GO Train-Bus Service) which provide off-peak and contra-peak service.

=== York Region Transit ===
- 18 Bur Oak eastbound to Cornell Terminal and westbound to Angus Glen Community Centre (No late evening or weekend service)
- 303 Bur Oak Express runs east along Bur Oak Avenue to the community of Cornell before running express to Finch Station. (rush hours only, AM to Finch, PM from Finch)
- 304 Mount Joy Express runs in the communities west and southwest of the station before running express to Finch Station. (rush hours only, AM to Finch, PM from Finch)

=== Toronto Transit Commission ===
102D Markham Road to Warden Station. This route is operated by the TTC on behalf of YRT. A YRT fare is charged when the bus is in Markham and a TTC fare charged when the bus is in Toronto (i.e. South of Steeles Avenue)
