= Oshawa Bus Terminal =

Former Canadian bus terminal

General information
- Location: 47 Bond Street West; Oshawa, Ontario; Canada
- Coordinates: 43°53′52″N 78°51′56″W
- Owner: City of Oshawa
- Bus operators: GO Transit; Durham Region Transit; TOK Coachlines

Construction
- Cycle facilities: Yes

Other information
- Station code: GO Transit: OSHW
- Fare zone: 94

History
- Closed: September 5, 2020
Location

Oshawa Bus Terminal was a bus terminal located at 47 Bond Street West in Oshawa, Ontario, Canada. The building is owned by the City of Oshawa and incorporates a multi-storey municipal parking lot; it no longer serves buses. City Council has adopted, in principle, the Downtown Action Plan, July 2005, which recommended that the bus terminal functions should be relocated from this priority development site.

On November 2, 2018, the Oshawa Bus Terminal partially shut down; ticket booths, the waiting room and washrooms were closed indefinitely. GO Transit stopped selling tickets at the ticket booth on October 30 but tickets and Presto remained available via a vending machine. Ticket sales for Durham Region Transit ended after November 2. Greyhound Canada ended parcel delivery services at the terminal on October 31.

Effective September 5, 2020, the bus terminal fully closed. GO Transit was the last user of the terminal. Instead of terminating at Oshawa Bus Terminal, GO routes 52 and 92 would use nearby street stops and would continue on to terminate at Oshawa GO Station instead of the downtown terminal.

As this is the hometown of General Motors Canada, the bus terminal has murals of the auto industry decorating the face of the structure. Eight panels represent each of GM's corporate values: Heritage, Diversity, People, Innovation, Safety, Environment, Customer Enthusiasm and Quality.

== Bus services ==
Since September 5, 2020, none of the following bus services have used the terminal. All have on-street stops in the vicinity of the closed terminal.

=== GO Transit ===
- Hwy 2 GO Bus Service (route 92) to Yorkdale Bus Terminal and Oshawa GO Station: The bus no longer stops inside the bus terminal as of September 5, 2020, and instead stops at Centre/Simcoe and Athol streets.
- Hwy 407 East GO Bus Service (route 52) to Highway 407 Bus Terminal via Durham College/UOIT and to Oshawa GO Station: The bus no longer stops inside the bus terminal as of September 5, 2020, and instead stops at Centre/Simcoe and Athol streets.
- Lakeshore East GO Train & Bus Service, from Oshawa GO Station to Courtice, Bowmanville and Newcastle (Note: this service operates on Bond Street and King Street, and does not enter the bus terminal)

=== Durham Region Transit ===
Customers travelling within Durham Region can ride on GO Transit buses with a DRT ticket, pass, or transfer under the fare integration agreement. Local DRT bus routes operate on the adjoining street grid: Centre Street, Simcoe Street, Bond Street and King Street.

- 401 / 401B / 401C Simcoe
- 402 King
- 405 / 405B Wilson
- 407 / 407C Ritson Colonel Sam
- 900 PULSE - Highway 2 BRT
