= Lincolnville, Whitchurch-Stouffville =

Lincolnville
- Unincorporated community
- Interactive map of Lincolnville
- Coordinates: 44°0′45.2412″N 79°14′22.4736″W
- Country: Canada
- Province: Ontario
- Regional municipality: York Region
- Town: Whitchurch-Stouffville
- Hamlet: Lincolnville
- Amalgamation: (With Village of Stouffville); 1 January 1971

Government
  - Type: Municipality
  - Mayor: Iain Lovatt
  - Councillor, Ward 5: Richard Bartley
- Elevation: 300 m (980 ft)
- Time zone: UTC−5 (EST)
  - Summer (DST): UTC−4 (EDT)
- Forward sortation area: L4A
- Area codes: 905 and 289

Lincolnville is a community and former hamlet situated in the Town of Whitchurch-Stouffville, Ontario, Canada.

Lincolnville is located at the intersection of Bloomington Road / Regional Road 40 (formerly Highway 47), York Durham Town Line / Regional Road 30 and Tenth Line (or 10th Concession Road).

Beyond an inn, saw mills and gravel pits (still in operation), it did not evolve as much as other hamlets in Whitchurch-Stouffville. The nearest post office in the 19th century was located further west in Bloomington. Toronto and Nipissing Railway built their line that crossed south in 1877 but stations were only found to the east in Goodwood and west in Stouffville. Subsequent owners do not service Lincolnville until GO Transit established a Lincolnville station in 2008, but that station was renamed Old Elm GO Station in October 2021.

The former hamlet remains a rural and mainly agricultural area with a few residential lots.

The hamlet name's origin is unknown but likely shares the same links to Abraham Lincoln as those in the United States and one in Nova Scotia. Maps from the 19th century (namely 1860s and 1870s) through into today often fail to mention the hamlet's existence.
