= Brantford Transit =

Public transit service serving Brantford, Ontario, Canada

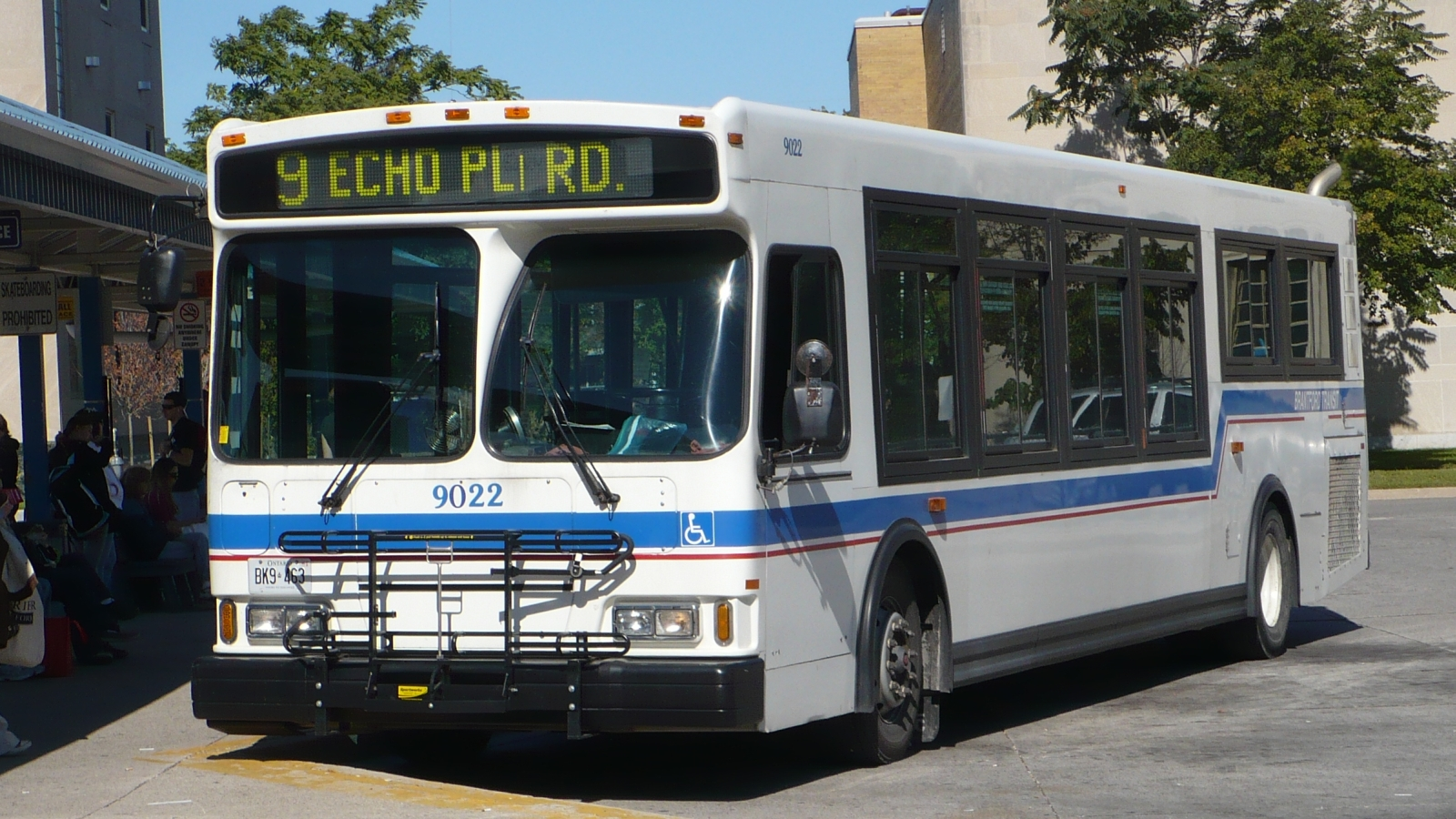
- Founded: 1940
- Headquarters: 64 Darling St., Brantford, ON
- Service area: Brantford, Ontario
- Service type: Bus service
- Routes: 13 fixed routes
- Stops: Over 500
- Hubs: Lynden Park Mall, Darling Street Terminal, and various points throughout Brantford
- Fleet: 36 conventional Busses; 10+ Paratransit vehicles (Brantford Lift)
- Daily ridership: 6000+
- Fuel type: Diesel and Natural unleaded gasoline Battery electric
- Operator: City of Brantford
- Website: Brantford Transit

Brantford Transit is a public transit service serving Brantford, Ontario, Canada. It operates bus service for over 2.5 Million passengers per year.

== Services ==
Regular transit services operate on a variety of routes & schedules from the downtown terminal and other transit hubs within the city.

Routes include:

- A Telephone Line
- B Daffodil Line
- 1 Eagle Place Loop
- 5 D'Aubigny Line
- 7 Braneida Loop
- 8 Holmedale and Mayfair Line
- 9 Echo Place and Sinclair Boulevard Loop
- 14 East Brantford Evening Loop
- 20 Grand River Line
- 21 Tollgate Line (limited weekday only service)
- 23 Memorial Line
- 24 Park Line
- 25 Beaver Line

Brantford Transit connects with regional transit and intercity services at the Brantford Transit Terminal, where GO Transit bus route 15 connects the city to stops in Hamilton before terminating at Aldershot GO Station in Burlington.

Brantford Lift is a Door-to-Door Para-Transit service for registered people who cannot access the planned route transit service due to accessibility issues.

== History ==
Public transit began in Brantford in 1886 with horse drawn cars which by 1893 had been converted to electric. The City of Brantford took over these operations in 1914. The Public Utilities Commission was formed in 1935 by amalgamating the Hydro Electric Commission, the Board of Water Commissioners and the Municipal Railway Commission. Around 1936 buses began to replace street cars and by the end of 1939 the change over was complete.

During the early 1980s Brantford Transit introduced brand painted buses in place of the normal cream and maroon livery. Examples include Minolta, Parsons, Whirlpool and Zenith. These rolling advertisements were the forerunners of today's ad wrapped buses you see now in Brantford and other cities.

The fleet colours were also changed to white, black, blue and red.

In September 2026, Brantford Transit took on the delivery of its first two battery electric buses from New Flyer Industries, the two buses entered service later that month.

== Fleet ==
Fleet number range	Year	Manufacturer	Model	Engine	Transmission
10121	2011	Nova Bus	LFS	Cummins ISL9	ZF 6AP1400B
10123-10125	2012	Nova Bus	LFS	Cummins ISL9	ZF 6AP1400B
10131-10132	2013	Nova Bus	LFS	Cummins ISL9	ZF 6AP1400B
10151-10153	2015	Nova Bus	LFS	Cummins ISL9	ZF 6AP1400B
10161-10162	2016	Nova Bus	LFS	Cummins ISL9	ZF 6AP1400B
101808-101810	2018	Nova Bus	LFS	Cummins L9	ZF 6AP1400B
102105-102109	2021	Nova Bus	LFS	Cummins L9	ZF 6AP1420B
102201-102205	2022	Nova Bus	LFS	Cummins L9	ZF 6AP1420B
102301-102301	2023	Nova Bus	LFS	Cummins L9	ZF 6AP1420B
2601-2609	2026	New Flyer Industries	XD40	Cummins L9	ZF 6AP1420B
2610-2611	2026	New Flyer Industries	XE40 CHARGE NG	Accelera ELFA 3	Direct Drive

== See also ==
- Public transport in Canada
