= Yorkdale Bus Terminal =

Bus terminal in Toronto, Ontario, Canada

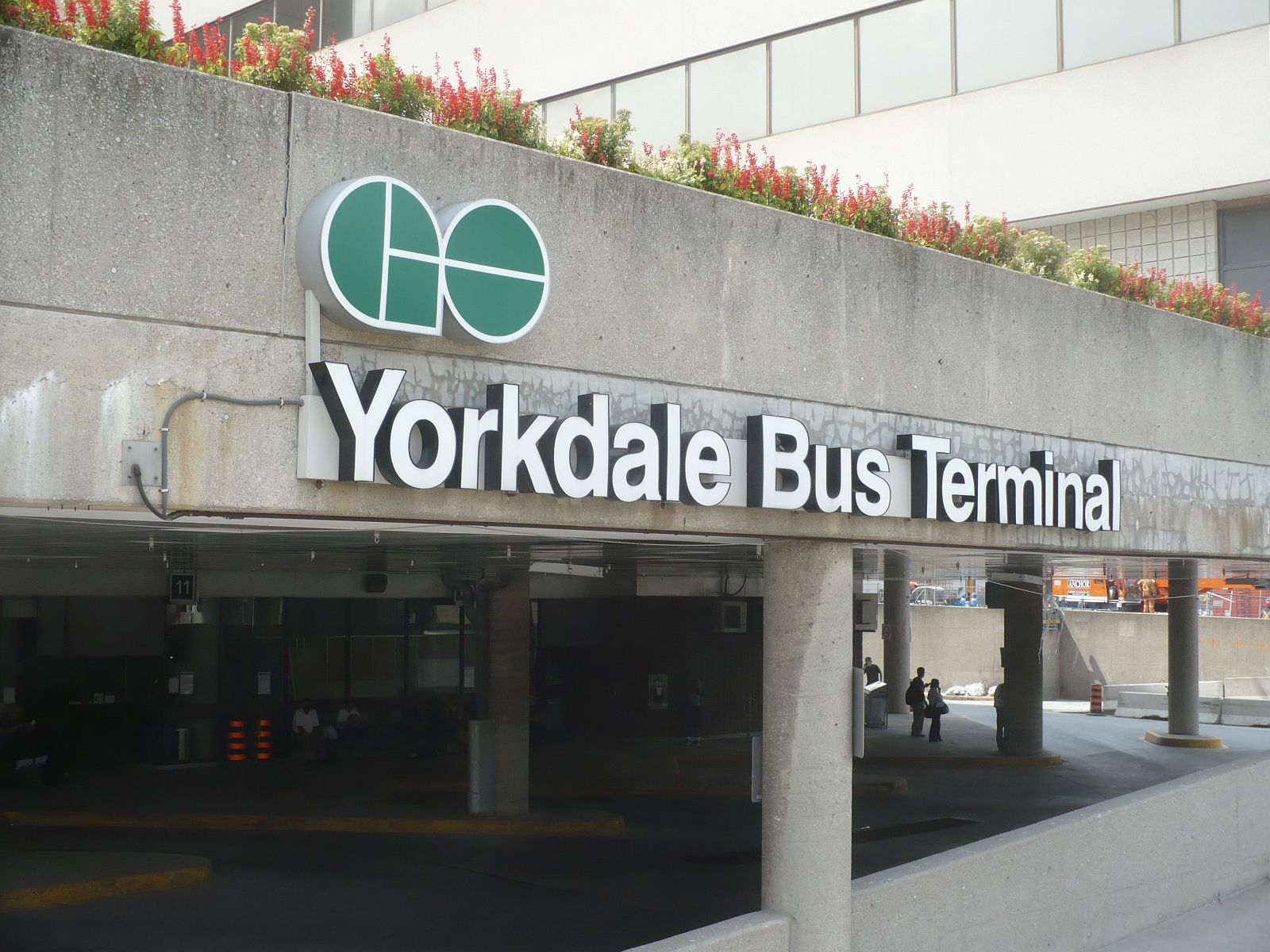

General information
- Location: 1 Yorkdale Road; Toronto, Ontario; Canada
- Coordinates: 43°43′31″N 79°26′56″W
- Bus stands: 13
- Bus operators: GO Bus; Ontario Northland; Megabus
- Connections: Yorkdale; TTC buses

Construction
- Parking: Shopping centre parking only

Other information
- Station code: GO Transit: YKDL

History
- Opened: 1979
Location

Yorkdale Bus Terminal, located at 1 Yorkdale Road, Toronto, Ontario, Canada occupies the lowest level of an office building adjacent to Yorkdale Shopping Centre and is connected directly to Yorkdale subway station by a pedestrian bridge.

Its creation was announced by James Snow, the Ontario Minister of Transportation and Communications, in March 1977. Construction of the station started soon afterward and was expected to be completed by late 1977.

The bus terminal is strategically located in the middle of what was formerly the North York, at Allen Road on the south side of Highway 401, the main transportation artery across the Greater Toronto Area. That is ideal for providing GO Transit commuter bus services to points east and west of the city and long-distance intercity coach connections by Ontario Northland. When it opened on October 12, 1979, it was a hub for Gray Coach interurban bus service and, until 2000, for the Toronto Airport Express bus service, which was originally operated by Gray Coach and, after 1993, by Pacific Western Transportation.

Because of the office building directly above the terminal, there is a severe height restriction within the terminal, which prevented GO Transit from operating its current fleet of double-decker buses into the terminal until Enviro 500 'Super-Lo' models became available.

== Services ==
=== GO Transit ===
- Route 19 Mississauga/North York
- Route 27 Milton/North York
- Route 33 Guelph/North York
- Route 36 Brampton/North York
- Route 92 Oshawa/Yorkdale
- Route 94 Pickering/Mississauga

=== Megabus ===
- Mississauga/Kingston

=== Ontario Northland ===
- Toronto/Sudbury
- Toronto/North Bay

== Local bus connections ==
Bus stop is located on the west side of Yorkdale Road to the north of the terminal.

- 47 Lansdowne (TTC)
