= Old Elm GO Station =

Railway station in Whitchurch-Stouffville, Canada

Old Elm
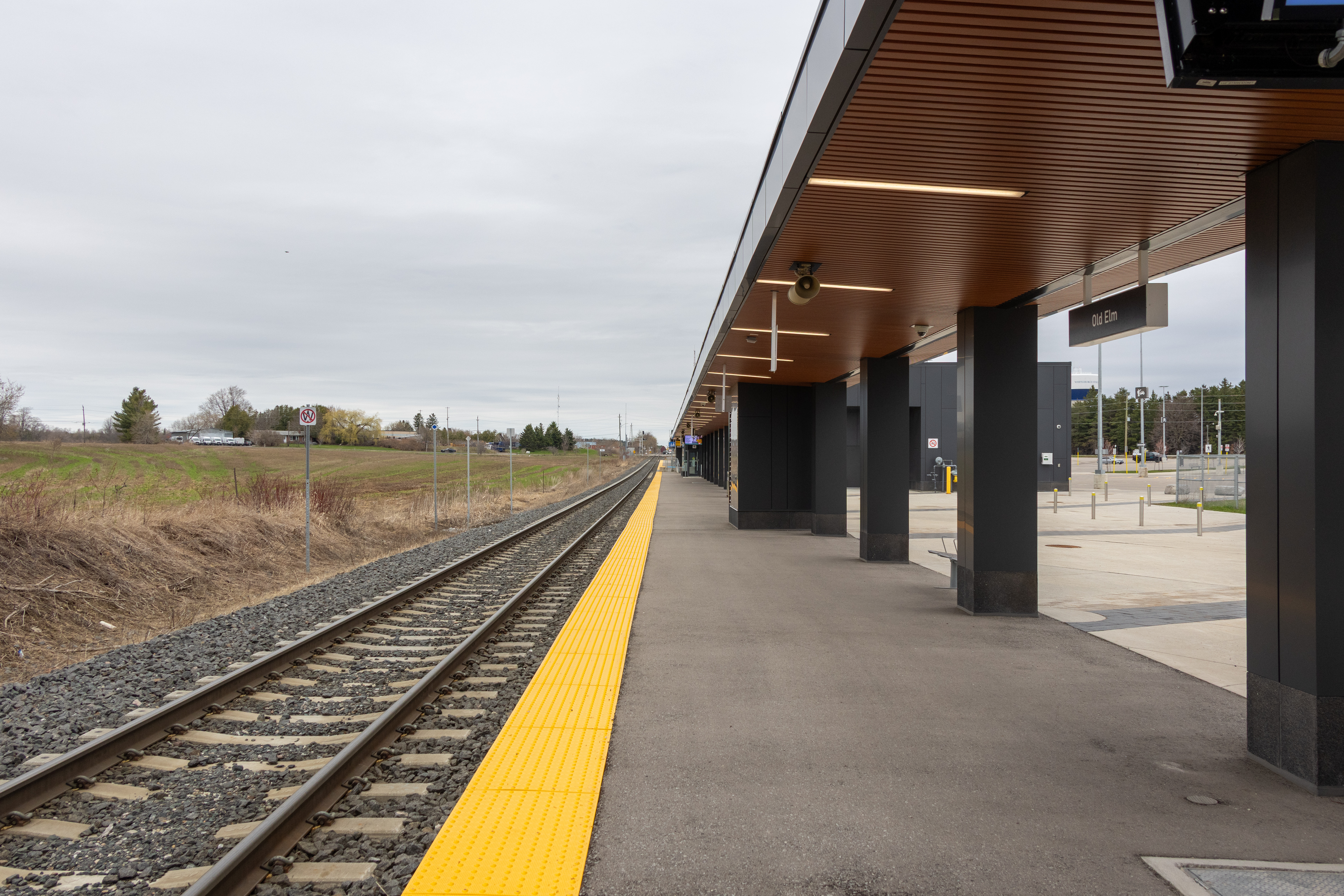
- Station platform in 2026

General information
- Location: 12958 Tenth Line; Stouffville, Ontario; Canada
- Coordinates: 43°59′25″N 79°14′13″W
- Owner: Metrolinx
- Platforms: Side platform
- Tracks: 1
- Bus routes: 70 71

Construction
- Structure type: Shelters
- Parking: 673 spaces
- Accessible: Yes

Other information
- Station code: GO Transit: LI
- Fare zone: 74

History
- Opened: 2008
- Rebuilt: 2023 at new location
- Former names: Lincolnville (2008–2021)

Passengers
- 2018: 33,000

Services
Preceding station	GO Transit	Following station
Stouffville towards Union	Stouffville	Terminus
Location

Old Elm GO Station (formerly Lincolnville) is a train and bus station in the GO Transit network located in Whitchurch-Stouffville, Ontario, Canada. Old Elm is the northeastern terminus of train service on the Stouffville line. The original station opened on September 2, 2008 on the north side of Bethesda Road, adjacent to the GO train storage yard. Old Elm was rebuilt further south on the west side of Tenth Line, and opened on October 17, 2023.

== Station name ==
The station was referred to by the provisional name of Stouffville North before adopting the Lincolnville name partway through construction. Historically, Lincolnville is the name of a hamlet which was located at the corner of Bloomington Road and Highway 47 (Old Concession 10 Road), divided between the townships of Uxbridge to the east and Whitchurch to the west. On October 16, 2021, the station was renamed Old Elm GO after an elm tree located on the premises of the new station along Tenth Line.

The station's namesake tree is 200 years old, 40 metres (130 ft) tall and 4 metres (13 ft) wide. It had survived Dutch elm disease during the 1970s and 1980s. The tree was to be cut down in order to make room for the station's bus loop, but the local community successfully lobbied to have it preserved. The bus loop was realigned around the tree, and as a result the station has 30–40 fewer parking spaces than originally planned.

== Description ==
The station has a bus loop and a passenger pick-up and drop-off area. There is parking for 673 vehicles including 15 accessibility stalls and 4 stalls for scooters and motorbikes. There are also 35 bike racks. The accessible platform features heated shelters, a platform canopy, and a platform snow-melting system. The station entrances for buses and motor vehicles are signalized.

== History ==
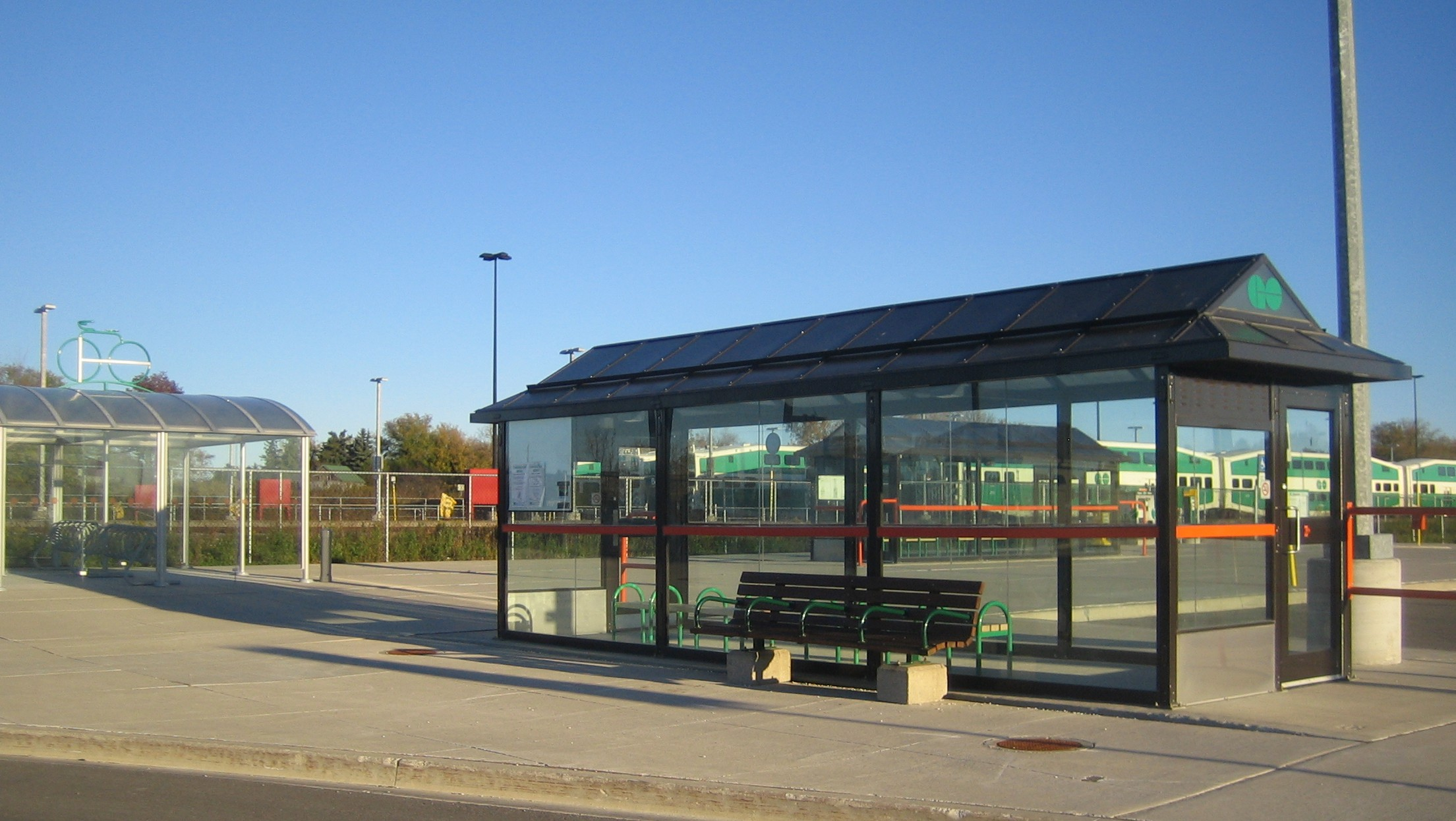
The first station, then-called Lincolnville, was located at Bethesda Road

Lincolnville station opened on September 2, 2008 at Bethesda Road, after some delay; it had initially been projected to open the preceding June. It was built to relieve the line's previous terminus, Stouffville GO Station, which is located in Stouffville proper; it could not expand its parking and had limited bus interchange capabilities. Constructed next to the existing Stouffville layover facility at 10th Line and Bethesda Road, Lincolnville station cost $5.5 million and extended passenger service approximately 3 kilometres (1.9 mi) farther from Union Station in Toronto. The station's park-and-ride catchment includes much of the municipality of Uxbridge, and it is seen as a precursor to eventual GO Train service to the townsite of Uxbridge proper. From 2010 to 2011, 410 additional parking spots were built, along with a bus storage facility and crew centre. The adjacent layover facility was completed in October 2019.

In 2021, construction began to relocate the station 500 metres (1,600 ft) to the south. The new station would include a parking lot with 672 spaces, a bike lane, a bus loop, and improved accessibility. The new station opened on October 17, 2023.

== Bus connections ==
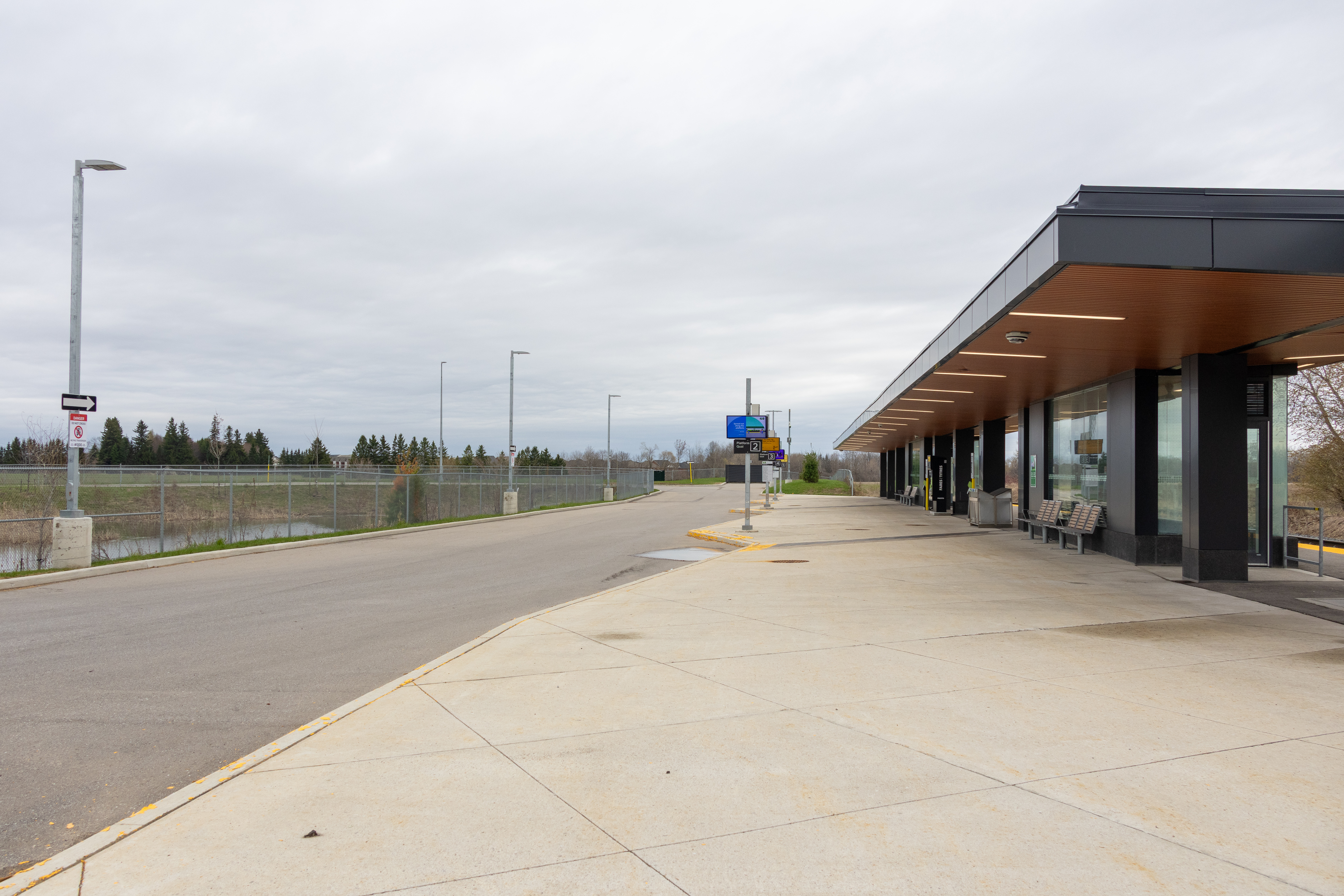
Bus platforms, located at the south end of the station.

- 70–71 GO Bus: Northbound to Goodwood and Uxbridge and southbound to Union Station.
- There is no local York Region Transit bus service.

== See also ==
- Uxbridge station (Ontario)
