= Toronto Premium Outlets =

Shopping center in Halton Hills, Ontario, Canada

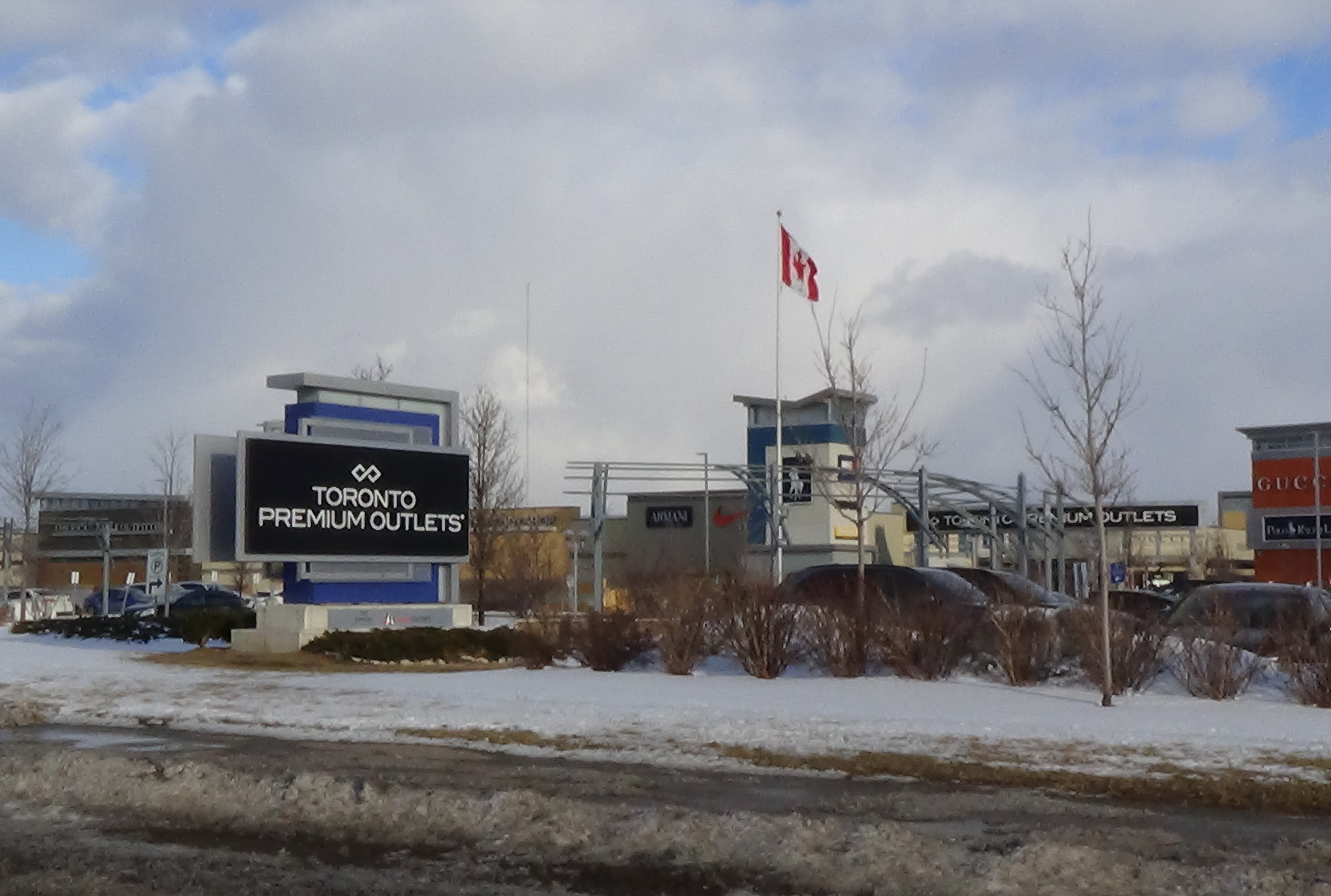
- Location: Halton Hills, Ontario, Canada
- Coordinates: 43.57553°N 79.82996°W
- Address: 13850 Steeles Avenue
- Opened: August 1, 2013
- Developer: Simon Property Group
- Manager: Helena Moniz, General Manager
- Owner: Premium Outlets and SmartCentres
- Floor area: 800,000
- Floors: 1 (Retail) 5 (Parking)

Toronto Premium Outlets is an outlet mall in Halton Hills, Ontario, Canada. Being the first Premium Outlets center in Canada, and the first conglomeration of stores of its type in that nation, the facility opened on August 1, 2013. It was formerly anchored by Saks Off 5th.

The mall has 800,000 square feet (74,322 square meters) of shopping including the first ever Hudson's Bay Discount Store, which was later replaced by the co-owned Saks Off 5th banner, as well as Canada's first Restoration Hardware store, which has since closed.

Phase 2 of the construction began in 2017 and was completed on November 15, 2018.

== See also ==
- Vaughan Mills
- Dixie Outlet Mall
