= Bramalea GO Station =

Railway and bus station in Ontario, Canada

Bramalea
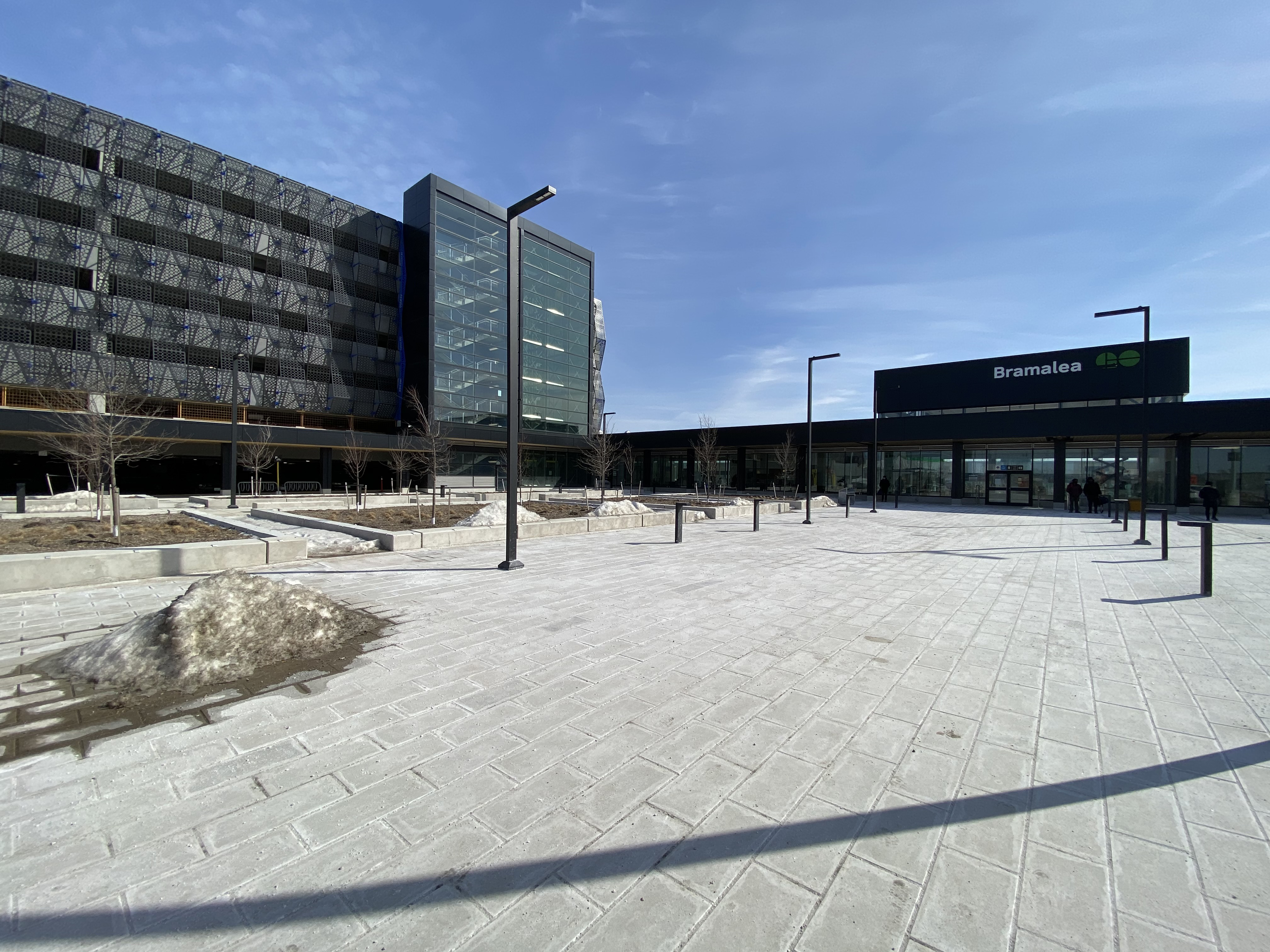
- Bramalea GO Station after rebuild in 2022

General information
- Location: 1713 Steeles Avenue; Brampton, Ontario
- Coordinates: 43°42′07″N 79°41′28″W
- Owner: Metrolinx
- Platforms: 1 side platform, 1 island platform
- Tracks: 4
- Bus routes: 30 31 32B 33H 36B 41 47 48 56
- Connections: Brampton Transit; MiWay

Construction
- Parking: 2,150 spaces
- Cycle facilities: Yes
- Accessible: Yes

Other information
- Station code: GO Transit: BE
- Fare zone: 32

Passengers
- 2018: 3300 (daily avg.) ▲1.1% (GO Transit)
- Rank: 8th in system, 2nd on Kitchener line

Services
Preceding station	GO Transit	Following station
Brampton towards Stratford	Kitchener	Malton towards Union
Brampton towards Stratford	Kitchener (express)	Union Terminus
Location

Bramalea GO Station is a GO Transit railway and bus station along the Kitchener line in Brampton, Ontario, Canada. It is located at 1713 Steeles Avenue East, near the community of Bramalea at Steeles Avenue East and Bramalea Road.

In addition to the Kitchener line train service, it is also served by numerous GO Transit, Brampton Transit bus routes, as well as one MiWay bus route.

Bramalea is equipped with parking facilities, elevators for wheelchair access, a station building housing a waiting room and ticket sales, a Ticket Vending Machine, and a bus loop. It is a common site for University of Waterloo students to transfer between the 30 bus and the train.

== History ==
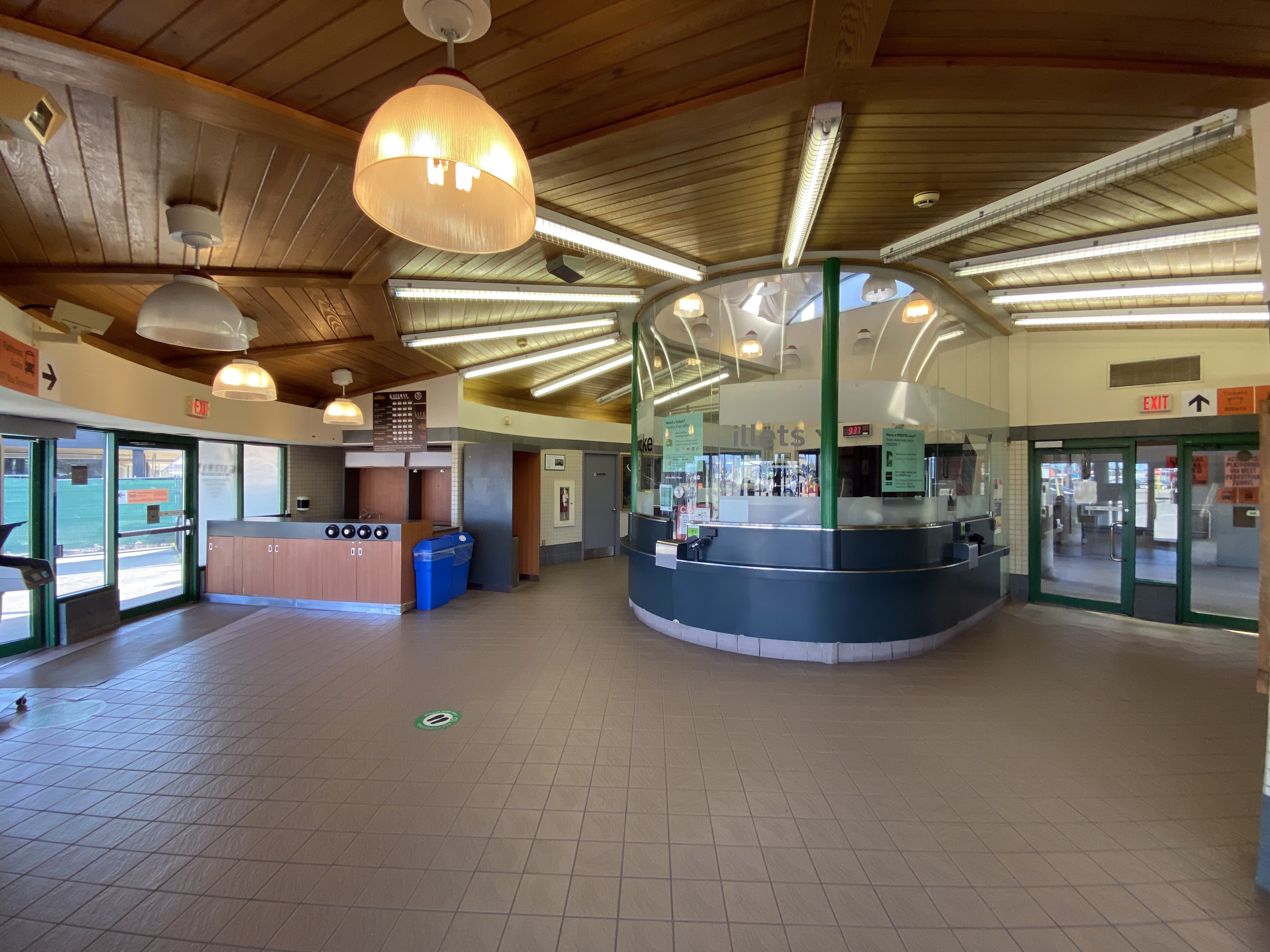
Original station building ticket office

Since midday train service on the Georgetown corridor was first launched in May 2002, GO Transit has hired various contractors to improve the station. First, the station was made wheelchair-accessible by building an additional pedestrian tunnel and a pair of elevators, completed in January 2003. In August of that year, construction began of a new rail platform, which was required to provide an all-day train service for the station, as the station is located on a busy railway corridor used by Canadian National Railways freight trains bypassing Toronto.

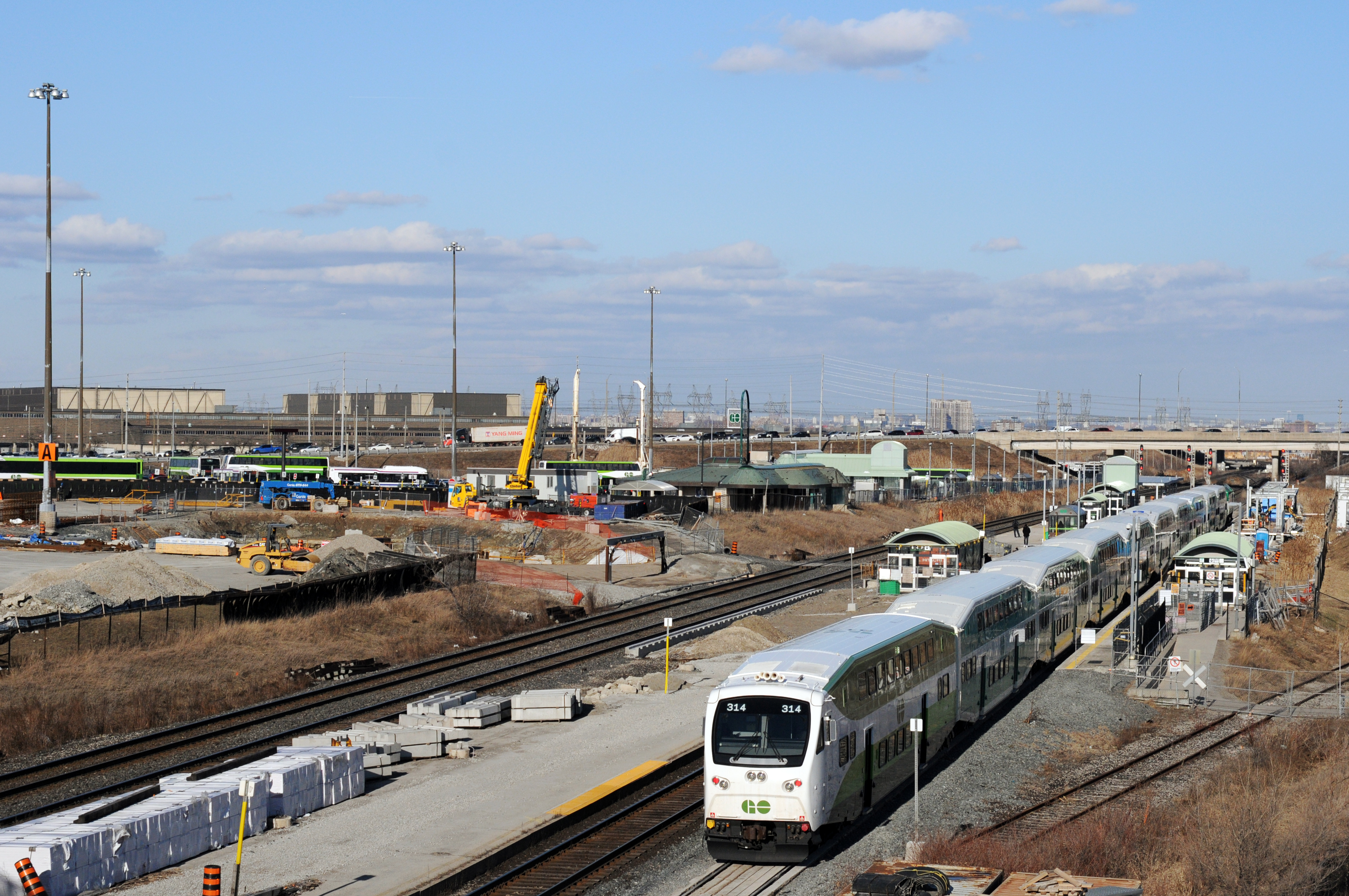
Construction improvements in 2019

To accommodate future increases in ridership, a new 650-space parking lot was opened in June 2005 on the south side of the tracks. GO Transit also constructed a bus garage at the northeast corner of Steeles Avenue and Bramalea Road. The garage was removed and replaced with additional parking spaces in November 2011. A platform extension to allow 12-car trains was completed in early 2017.

To support GO expansion plans for more frequent and reliable service on the Kitchener line, Bramalea station has undergone major improvements, including a new station building linked to a parking garage, a new passenger pick-up and drop-off area, improved bus platforms for GO Transit and Brampton Transit, with a dedicated Züm bus stop, covered bike parking, new retail spaces, improved access to Bramalea Road, a new accessible pedestrian tunnel at the west end of the station, enhanced safety features including new emergency call systems and upgraded lighting, platform improvements with a snow-melt system, and an extended platform to accommodate 12-car trains.

On September 13, 2021, a new parking garage opened as part of a rehabilitation project at the station. The multi-level garage can hold 2,059 vehicles and features a colour-coded wayfinding system, two elevators, a car counting system and over 100 security cameras. The car counting system will identify which levels have available parking spots, distinguishing accessibility from regular spots. Also opening is a new accessible tunnel to access train platforms directly from the station building. The station building has been redesigned with larger windows.

The improvement work was initially planned for completion in 2021, and after construction delays, the station revamp was completed on May 11, 2023.

== Bus service ==
Bus bay assignments:

- 5 – GO Transit Routes: 41, 47, 47D Westbound
- 6 – GO Transit Route: 56 Westbound
- 7 – GO Transit Route: 30 Westbound
- 8 – GO Transit Routes: 32, 36B
- 9 – GO Transit Route: 48 Westbound
- 10 – GO Transit Routes: 41, 41A, 47 Eastbound
- 11 – GO Transit Routes: 48, 56 Eastbound
- 12 – Brampton Transit Route: 15 Bramalea Southbound; MiWay Route: 51 Tomken
- 13 – Brampton Transit Routes: 40 Central Industrial, 92 Bramalea GO Shuttle
- 14 – Brampton Transit Routes: 13 Avondale, 16 Southgate
- 15 – Brampton Transit Route: 15/15A Bramalea Northbound
- 16 – GO Transit Routes: 25F, 48-B,F Westbound
