= Square One Bus Terminal =

GO Transit bus terminal in Mississauga, Ontario

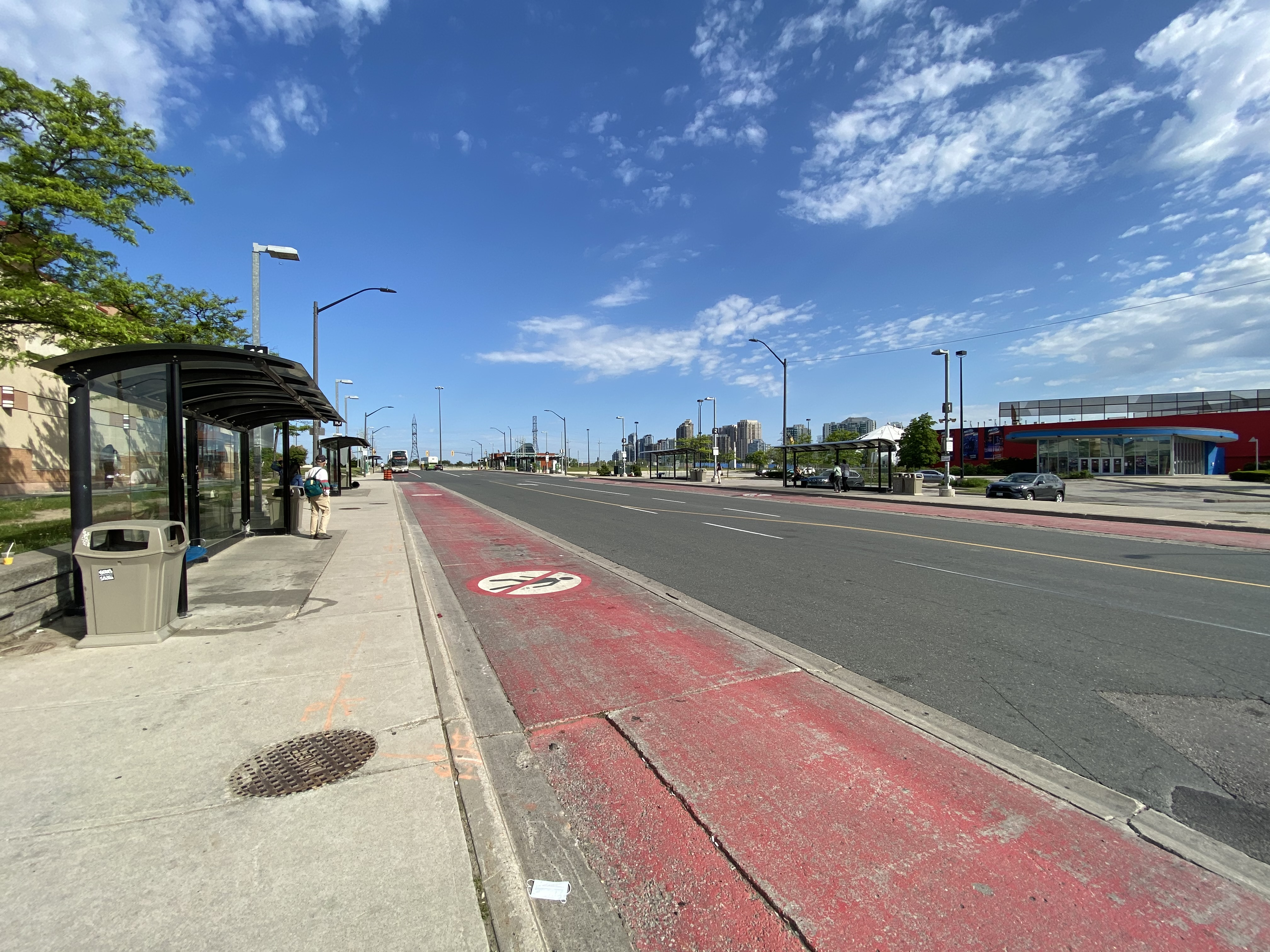

General information
- Location: 210 Centre View Drive; Mississauga, Ontario; Canada
- Coordinates: 43°35′41″N 79°38′51″W
- Bus stands: 12 bus bays
- Connections: at City Centre Transit Terminal

Construction
- Structure type: Bus shelters
- Parking: 193 spaces
- Cycle facilities: No
- Accessible: Yes

Other information
- Station code: GO Transit: 00132
- Fare zone: 20

History
- Rebuilt: 2016

Future services
Preceding station	Metrolinx	Following station
Eglinton toward Brampton Gateway	Hurontario LRT	Robert Speck toward Port Credit
Location

The Square One Bus Terminal is a GO Transit intercity bus terminal located in central Mississauga, Ontario, Canada. It is situated directly across Rathburn Road West from the City Centre Transit Terminal (the main hub for local MiWay bus service and a stop on the Mississauga Transitway) and Square One Shopping Centre, after which the terminal is named.

Routes stopping at the terminal include: off-peak bus service along the Milton GO Train corridor from downtown Toronto; Mississauga to Finch Bus Terminal; Mississauga to Guelph; Hamilton to Richmond Hill; Highway 407 West routes; and routes connecting Waterloo Region to Greater Toronto.

Services will also connect to the planned Hurontario LRT on Hurontario Street.

== Facilities ==
A permanent terminal building was opened in March 2016. The terminal includes public washrooms, an indoor waiting area, staffed ticket counters and 24-hour automated ticket vending machines.

The terminal includes 193 parking spaces along Centre View Drive.

== GO bus services ==
Westbound platform assignments:

- Platform 1: 40/40A Trafalgar Road, Dundas Street & Hamilton GO Centre
- Platform 2: 41, 47/47D Hamilton GO Centre
- Platform 3: 56/56B Oakville GO Station
- Platform 4: 21/21C
- Platform 5: 29 Guelph/Mississauga
- Platform 6: 25/25C Waterloo/Mississauga

Eastbound platform assignments:

- Platform 8: 41/41A Pickering GO Station, 47/47D Highway 407 station
- Platform 9: 56 Oshawa GO Station, 56B Highway 407 station
- Platform 10: 40 Pearson Airport/Richmond Hill Centre, 94 Pickering GO Station
- Platform 11: 19/19B Mississauga/North York/Kipling Bus Terminal, 29 Kipling Bus Terminal
- Platform 12: 21/21C Toronto Union Station
