= Goodwood, Ontario =

Place in Ontario, Canada

Coordinates: 44.036234°N 79.197895°W

Goodwood is an unincorporated community in Ontario, Canada. It is recognized as a designated place by Statistics Canada. Goodwood served as the primary exterior location in the Canadian comedy series Schitt's Creek.

== Demographics ==
In the 2021 Census of Population conducted by Statistics Canada, Goodwood had a population of 689 living in 237 of its 242 total private dwellings, a change of 3.9% from its 2016 population of 663. With a land area of 1.43 km^{2} (0.55 sq mi), it had a population density of 481.8/km^{2} (1,247.9/sq mi) in 2021.

== See also ==
- List of communities in Ontario
- List of designated places in Ontario
