= List of York Region Transit and Viva bus routes =

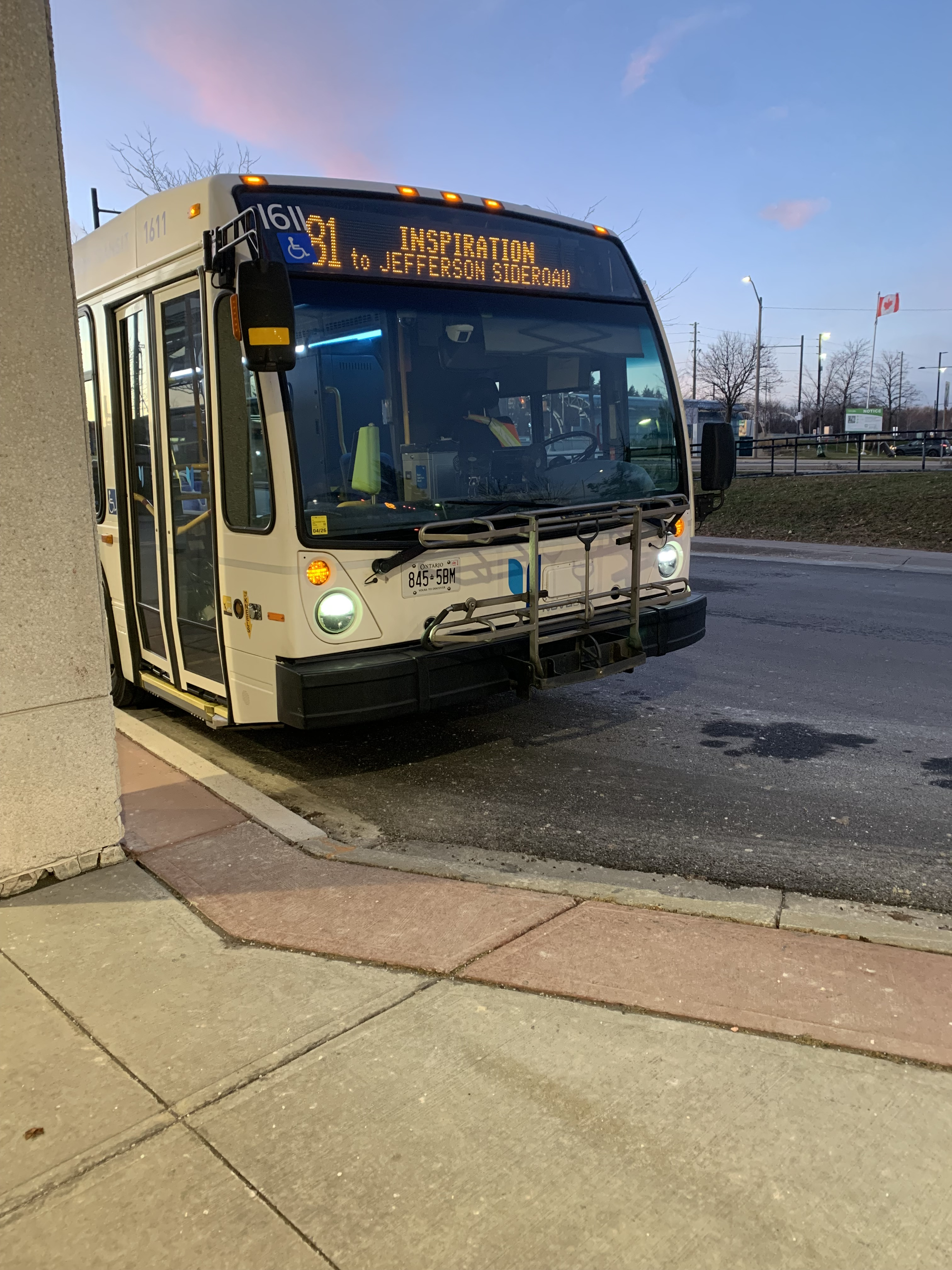
A 2016 NovaBus LFS on the 81 Inspiration service

This is a list of York Region Transit and Viva Rapid Transit bus routes in York Region, north of Toronto, Canada. The routes are divided into branch routes.

== Routes ==
Route information effective as of September 6, 2026.

=== Numbering conventions ===
- 1 to 199 — Regular bus (including Toronto Transit Commission (TTC) contracted routes)
- 300 series — Express
- 400 series — High school specials
- 500 series — Community bus
- 600 series — Viva (used internally)

Separate routes with duplicate names are distinguished by showing cardinal directions in brackets for the portions of the streets each serves.

Number	Route name	East/north destination	West/south destination	Via points	Connecting Viva services	Service time	Notes
1	Highway 7 (East)	Cornell Terminal	Richmond Hill Centre Terminal	Markham Stouffville Hospital, Copper Creek Dr.	Blue, Orange, Purple	Monday–Sunday	
2	Milliken	Eastvale Dr. / Cornell Terminal	Finch GO Bus Terminal	Middlefield Collegiate Institute	Blue, Purple	Monday–Sunday	Two weekday trips divert to Middlefield C.I. via Middlefield Rd., Highglen Ave., and Fonda Rd. during the school year. Weekday trips end at Markham Rd. & Denison St. Weekend trips end at Cornell Terminal.
3	Thornhill	The Shops on Steeles and 404	Pioneer Village TTC station	Promenade Terminal, Thornhill Community Centre	Blue, Orange	Monday–Sunday	
4	Major Mackenzie (Central)	Woodbine Ave.	Major Mackenzie West Terminal		Blue	Monday–Sunday	
5	Clark	Finch GO Bus Terminal	Glen Shields Ave.		Blue	Monday–Saturday	Trips operate counter-clockwise along Glen Shields Ave. during weekday AM rush and clockwise at all other times.
6	Major Mackenzie (West)	Major Mackenzie West Terminal	Barons St.			Monday–Sunday	
7	Martin Grove	Al Palladini Community Centre	Humber College TTC station		Orange	Monday–Sunday	
8	Kennedy	Major MacKenzie Dr.	Steeles Ave.	Milliken GO Station, Unionville GO Station	Purple	Monday–Sunday	
9	Ninth Line	Walmart Stouffville	Riverwalk Dr.	Cornell Terminal	Purple	Monday–Sunday	
10	Woodbridge	Vaughan Metropolitan Centre TTC station	Martin Grove Rd.		Orange	Rush Hour Only	
12	Pine Valley	Vaughan Mills Terminal	Islington Loop		Orange	Rush Hour Only	
13	Islington	Kleinburg	Humber College TTC station	Finch Avenue (connects with 6 other TTC Line 6 Finch West stops)	Orange	Monday–Friday	
14	14th Avenue	Cornell Terminal	Woodbine Ave.	Rouge Bank Dr.	Purple	Monday–Friday	Operates along Rouge Bank Dr. and Russell Jarvis Dr. during rush hour.
16	16th Avenue	Cornell Terminal	Lebovic Campus Dr.		Blue, Purple	Monday–Sunday	
17A	Birchmount	Highway 7	Warden TTC station		Purple	Rush Hour Only	Operated by the TTC.
18	Bur Oak	Cornell Terminal	Angus Glen Community Centre		Purple	Rush Hour Only	
20	Jane	Teston Rd.	Pioneer Village TTC station	Highway 407 TTC Station, Vaughan Metropolitan Centre TTC station, Vaughan Mills Terminal, Major Mackenzie West Terminal	Orange	Monday–Sunday	
21	Vellore	Cityview Blvd.	Vaughan Mills Terminal			Rush Hour Only	
23	Thornhill Woods	Teston Rd.	Finch GO Bus Terminal	Promenade Terminal	Blue, Orange	Rush Hour Only	
24	Woodbine	Honda Canada Plant	Don Mills TTC station	Allstate Parkway, Hillmount Rd.	Purple	Serves Allstate Parkway during rush hours and Hillmount Rd. during weekdays.	
25	Major Mackenzie (East)	Cornell Terminal	Harding Blvd.	Highway 404 & Major Mackenzie Park & Ride Lot	Blue, Purple	Monday–Saturday	
26	Maple	Maple GO Station	Vaughan Metropolitan Centre TTC station	Vaughan Mills Terminal	Orange	Rush Hour Only	
32	Aurora South	Bayview Ave. & Stone Rd.	Bathurst St. & McClellan Way	Aurora GO Station	Blue	Rush Hour Only	
33	Wellington–Leslie	Davis Drive & Highway 404 Park & Ride	Murray Dr.	Aurora GO Station	Blue, Yellow	Monday–Saturday	
40	Unionville	Markville Mall	Woodbine Ave.		Purple	Rush Hour Only	
44	Bristol	Newmarket Bus Terminal	Clockwise Loop	Upper Canada Mall	Blue, Yellow	Rush Hour Only	
50	Queensway	Sutton	Newmarket Bus Terminal	Newmarket GO Station, Southlake Regional Health Centre, Health and Active Living Plaza, Keswick Marketplace, The ROC	Blue, Yellow	Monday–Sunday	During the winter season it diverts to The ROC.
51	Keswick	Simcoe Ave.	Multi-Use Recreation Complex (MURC)	Keswick Marketplace		PM Rush Only	Three weekday afternoon rush hour trips it operates.
52	Holland Landing	Holland Landing	Newmarket Bus Terminal	Grist Mill	Blue, Yellow	Rush Hour Only	Southbound morning trips and northbound afternoon trips serve Grist Mill Plaza.
54	Bayview (North)	East Gwillimbury GO Station	Yonge St. & Wellington St.	Newmarket GO Station, Aurora GO Station	Blue, Yellow	Monday–Saturday	
55	Davis	Davis Drive & Highway 404 Park & Ride	Newmarket Bus Terminal	Newmarket GO Station, Southlake Regional Health Centre, Huron Heights Dr., 404 Town Centre	Blue, Yellow	Rush Hour Only	
56	Gorham–Eagle	404 Town Center	Newmarket Bus Terminal	Upper Canada Mall	Blue, Yellow	Rush Hour Only	
57	Mulock	404 Town Centre	Newmarket Bus Terminal		Blue, Yellow	Monday–Sunday	
68B	Warden	Angus Glen Community Centre	Warden TTC station		Purple	Monday–Sunday	Operated by the TTC. Increased frequency during the holiday season.
77	Highway 7 (West)	Finch GO Bus Terminal	Highway 50	Clark Ave., Promenade Terminal, Vaughan Metropolitan Centre TTC station	Blue, Orange	Monday–Sunday	Sunday service operates via Clark Ave. and New Westminster Dr. and Promenade Terminal. All other services operate via Yonge St. and Centre St.
80	Elgin Mills	Betty Roman Blvd.	Elgin West Community Centre		Blue	Monday–Sunday	
81	Inspiration	Bernard Terminal	Jefferson Sideroad	Richmond Hill High School	Blue	Rush Hour Only	Two trips divert via Richmond Hill High School.
82	Valleymede	Elgin Mills Rd. E.	Leslie St. & Commerce Valley Dr.	Richmond Green S.S., St Robert C.H.S	Purple	Rush Hour Only	Two trips divert via Richmond Green High School. Two trips also divert via St Robert Catholic School.
83	Trench	Bernard Terminal	Richmond Hill Centre	Richmond Hill High School, St Theresa High School	Blue, Orange, Purple	Monday–Friday	Two weekday trips divert via Richmond Hill High School. Six trips divert along Shaftsbury Ave. and Bathurst St. to serve St Theresa of Lisieux Catholic High School.
83A	Trench	Richmond Green S.S.	Hillcrest Mall		Blue	Rush Hour Only	
85	Rutherford	Leslie St.	Napa Valley Ave.	Rutherford GO Station, Vaughan Mills Terminal	Blue	Monday–Sunday	Select rush hour trips divert via Rutherford GO Station.
86	Newkirk–Red Maple	Shadow Falls Dr.	Richmond Hill Centre Terminal	Our Lady Queen of the World C.A., Richmond Hill GO Station	Blue, Orange, Purple	Monday–Saturday	Ten Northbound and Ten Southbound trips (One during the AM and one during the PM each direction) go via Crosby Ave. and Centre St. serving Our Lady Queen of the World C.A. Eighteen weekday trips divert via Richmond Hill GO Station, meeting GO Trains.
87	Autumn Hill	Richmond Hill Centre Terminal	Maple GO Station		Blue, Orange, Purple	Rush Hour Only	
88	Bathurst	Seneca College King Campus	Finch GO Bus Terminal	Promenade Terminal	Blue, Orange	Monday–Sunday	Two early morning southbound trips start from Elgin West Community Centre.
90	Leslie	John Birchall Rd.	Don Mills TTC station		Purple	Monday–Sunday	
90B	Leslie	16th Ave. (AM) / Highway 7 (PM)	Don Mills TTC station		Purple	Rush Hour Only	
91	Bayview (South)	Subrisco Ave.	Finch GO Bus Terminal		Blue, Purple	Monday–Sunday	
91B	Bayview (South)	Oak Ridges	Richmond Hill Centre Terminal		Blue, Orange, Purple	Rush Hour Only	
96	Keele–Yonge	Newmarket Bus Terminal	Pioneer Village station	King City GO Station, Kirby Rd.	Blue, Orange, Yellow	Monday–Sunday	Operates into Ravineview Dr. and Kirby Rd. during rush hours.
98	Yonge (North)	Green Lane	Bernard Terminal	Newmarket Bus Terminal	Blue, Yellow	Monday–Sunday	Late-night service is combined with route 99 Yonge, bypassing stop inside Bernard Terminal.
99	Yonge (South)	Bernard Terminal	Finch GO Bus Terminal	Richmond Hill Centre Terminal	Blue, Orange, Purple	Monday–Sunday	Late-night service is combined with route 98 Yonge, bypassing stop inside Bernard Terminal.
102D	Markham Rd.	Major Mackenzie Dr.	Warden TTC station		Purple	Monday–Sunday	Operated by the TTC.
105	Dufferin	Major Mackenzie Dr./Rutherford Rd.	Sheppard West TTC station		Orange	Monday–Sunday	No late evening & weekend service north of Rutherford Rd.
107	Keele	Teston Rd.	Pioneer Village TTC station		Orange	Monday–Sunday	
107B	Keele	Rutherford GO Station	Pioneer Village TTC station		Orange	Monday–Friday	
129A	McCowan North	Major MacKenzie Dr.	Kennedy Station		Purple	Monday–Sunday	Operated by the TTC.
160	Bathurst North	Promenade Terminal & Centre St.	Wilson TTC station		Orange	Monday–Sunday	Operated by the TTC.
165	Weston	Major Mackenzie West Terminal	Pioneer Village TTC station		Orange	Monday–Sunday	
300	Business Express	Finch GO Bus Terminal	Town Centre Blvd.		Blue, Purple	Rush Hour Only	Operates from Finch in AM and to Finch in PM.
301	Markham Express	Finch GO Bus Terminal	Mount Joy GO Station		Blue, Purple	Rush Hour Only	Operates to Finch in AM and from Finch in PM.
302	Unionville Express	Finch GO Bus Terminal	Main Street Unionville		Blue, Purple	Rush Hour Only	Operates to Finch in AM and from Finch in PM.
303	Bur Oak Express	Finch GO Bus Terminal	Mount Joy GO Station		Blue, Purple	Rush Hour Only	Operates to Finch in AM and from Finch in PM.
304	Mount Joy Express	Finch GO Bus Terminal	Mount Joy GO Station		Blue, Purple	Rush Hour Only	Operates to Finch in AM and from Finch in PM.
305	Box Grove Express	Finch GO Bus Terminal	Box Grove & Copper Creek		Blue	Rush Hour Only	
320	Jane Express	Major Mackenzie West Terminal	Highway 407 Station	Vaughan Metropolitan Centre TTC station, Vaughan Mills Terminal	Orange	Monday–Sunday	Formerly 720 - Highway 407 Term/Wonderland
360	Vaughan Mills/Wonderland	Finch GO Bus Terminal	Major Mackenzie West Terminal/Vaughan Metropolitan Centre TTC station	Richmond Hill Centre Terminal	Blue, Orange, Purple	Seasonal Service	Goes to Canada's Wonderland when it opens; while at other times it terminates at Vaughan Mills Terminal. Formerly 760 Vaughan Mills/Wonderland
361	Nashville Express	Major Mackenzie Dr.	Highway 407 Station			Rush Hour Only	Route operates in both directions during peak hours rather than peak direction.
391	Bayview Express	Subrisco Ave.	Finch GO Bus Terminal		Blue	AM Rush Only and Peak direction only	Trips start at Woodriver St. and Rosetree St. and serve limited stops to High Tech Rd., where it operates express to Finch GO Bus Terminal.
401	St. Brother Andre C.H.S.	Brother Andre C.H.S.	McCowan Rd. & 14th Ave.		Purple	School Days	
402	Bur Oak S.S. / Pierre Elliott Trudeau H.S.	Markham-Stouffville Hospital	Angus Glen Community Centre		Purple	School Days	
403	St. Brother Andre C.H.S.	Brother Andre C.H.S.	Markville Mall		Purple	School Days	
404	Markville S.S	Markville Secondary School	Helen Ave.		Purple	School Days	
405	St. Augustine C.H.S.	Markville Mall	St. Augustine C.H.S.		Purple	School Days	
408	Our Lady Queen of the World C.A.	Our Lady Queen of the World Catholic Academy	Richmond Hill Centre Terminal		Blue, Orange, Purple	PM School Days	
410	Markham District H.S.	Markham District H.S.	Woodbine Ave.			School Days	
411	Markham District H.S.	Markham District H.S.	Markham Rd. & 14th Ave.		Purple	School Days	
412	Thornlea S.S.	Thornlea S.S.	Simonston Blvd.			PM School Days	
413	St. Robert C.H.S. / Thornlea S.S.	St Robert C.H.S.	Simonston Blvd.			School Days	
414	St. Katharine Drexel C.H.S.	St. Katharine Drexel C.H.S.	Hoover Park Dr. & Sandiford Dr.			School Days	
415	Stouffville H.S.	Stouffville H.S.	Millard St. & Highway 48			School Days	
416	Markham District H.S.	Markham District H.S.	Riverwalk Dr.		Purple	School Days	
417	Bill Hogarth S.S.	Millard St.	Bill Hogarth S.S.		Purple	School Days	
418	Pierre Elliott Trudeau H.S.	Pierre Elliott Trudeau H.S.	Stony Hill Blvd.			School Days	
419	Pierre Elliott Trudeau H.S.	Pierre Elliott Trudeau H.S.	Elgin Mills Rd. E.			School Days	
420	Newmarket H.S.	Newmarket H.S.	Newmarket Bus Terminal		Blue, Yellow	School Days	
423	Newmarket H.S.	Newmarket H.S.	Bathurst St. & Woodspring Ave.		Yellow	School Days	
424	Keswick H.S.	Keswick H.S.	Ravenshoe			School Days	
425	Huron Heights S.S.	Huron Heights S.S.	Holland Landing		Yellow	School Days	
426	G.W. Williams H.S.	G.W. Williams H.S.	Bayview Ave. & Stone Rd.			School Days	
427	Sacred Heart H.S.	Sacred Heart H.S.	St. John's Sideroad	Newmarket H.S. (afternoon only)		School Days	
428	G.W. Williams H.S.	G.W. Williams H.S.	Bathurst St. & McClellan Way		Blue	School Days	
429	Cardinal Carter C.H.S.	Cardinal Carter C.H.S	Old Colony Rd.		Blue	School Days	
430	Sacred Heart C.H.S.	Sacred Heart C.H.S.	Newmarket Bus Terminal		Blue, Yellow	School Days	
431	Aurora H.S.	Aurora H.S.	Bathurst St. & McClellan Way			School Days	
432	Aurora H.S.	Bayview Ave. & Stone Rd.	Aurora H.S.		Blue	School Days	
433	Cardinal Carter C.H.S	Cardinal Carter C.H.S	Bathurst St. & King Rd.		Blue	School Days	
434	Cardinal Carter C.H.S	Murray Dr. & Wellington St.	Cardinal Carter C.H.S		Blue	School Days	
437	St Maximilian Kolbe C.H.S	Memorial Circle	St Maximilian Kolbe C.H.S			School Days	
438	St Maximilian Kolbe C.H.S	Orchard Heights Dr.	St Maximilian Kolbe C.H.S		Blue	School Days	
440	St Theresa C.H.S	St Theresa C.H.S	Centre St. E.		Blue	School Days	
442	Richmond Hill H.S.	Richmond Hill H.S.	Tower Hill Rd.		Blue	PM School Days	
443	Langstaff H.S.	Bernard Terminal	Richmond Hill Centre Terminal		Blue, Orange, Purple	School Days	
444	Langstaff H.S.	Langstaff H.S.	Commerce Valley Dr. West		Blue, Orange, Purple	School Days	
445	St Robert C.H.S.	Bernard Terminal	St Robert C.H.S.		Blue, Purple	PM School Days	
446	St Theresa C.H.S.	St Theresa C.H.S.	McCallum Dr.			School Days	
447	St Theresa C.H.S.	St Theresa C.H.S.	Shadow Falls Dr.		Blue	School Days	
448	Richmond Hill H.S.	Richmond Hill H.S.	Commerce Valley		Blue, Purple	School Days	
449	Richmond Green S.S.	Richmond Green S.S.	Woodbine Ave. & Major Mackenzie Dr.			School Days	
450	St Theresa C.H.S	St Theresa C.H.S.	Jefferson Sideroad & Yonge St.		Blue	School Days	
452	Richmond Green S.S.	Richmond Green S.S.	Hazelton Ave.			School Days	
460	Holy Cross C.A.	Forest Dr.	Holy Cross Catholic Academy		Orange	PM School Days	
461	Emily Carr S.S.	Emily Carr S.S.	Martin Grove Rd. & Langstaff Rd.			School Days	
462	Maple H.S.	Maple H.S.	Rutherford Rd.			School Days	
463	St. Joan of Arc C.H.S.	Kirby Rd.	St. Joan of Arc C.H.S.			School Days	
464	St. Joan of Arc C.H.S.	St. Joan of Arc C.H.S.	Vaughan Mills Terminal			School Days	
465	St. Joan of Arc C.H.S.	St. Joan of Arc C.H.S.	Knightswood Ave.			School Days	
466	Tommy Douglas S.S.	Tommy Douglas S.S.	Vaughan Mills Terminal			School Days	
467	Tommy Douglas S.S.	Tommy Douglas S.S.	Vaughan Mills Terminal	St Jean de Brebeuf C.H.S		PM School Days	
469	Father Bressani C.H.S	Vaughan Mills Terminal	Father Bressani C.H.S			School Days	
470	Westmount S.S	Teston Rd.	Promenade Terminal	Stephen Lewis S.S.	Orange	School Days	
471	Stephen Lewis S.S.	Kirby Rd.	Stephen Lewis Secondary School			School Days	
473	Stephen Lewis S.S.	Teston Rd.	Stephen Lewis Secondary School			School Days	
501	Züm Queen	Vaughan Metropolitan Centre TTC station	Downtown Brampton Terminal	Highway 7	Orange	Monday–Sunday	Operated by Brampton Transit.
522	Markham Local	Cornell Terminal	Hagerman's Corners	2 Raymerville Dr.	Purple	Monday–Friday	
601	Viva Blue	Newmarket Bus Terminal	Finch GO Bus Terminal	Richmond Hill Centre Terminal	Orange, Purple, Yellow	Monday–Sunday	Operates on rapidway from Highway 7 to 19th Ave, with a gap in between Major MacKenzie Dr. and North of Crosby Ave. and from Mulock Dr. to Davis Dr.
601B	Viva Blue "B"	Bernard Terminal	Finch GO Bus Terminal	Richmond Hill Centre Terminal	Orange, Purple, Yellow	Monday–Sunday	Operates on rapidway from Highway 7 to Bernard Ave, with a gap in between Major MacKenzie Dr. and North of Crosby Ave.
603	Viva Purple	Cornell Terminal	Richmond Hill Centre Terminal		Blue, Orange	Monday–Sunday	Operates on rapidway from Bayview Ave. to Town Centre Blvd.
603A	Viva Purple "A"	Cornell Terminal	Richmond Hill Centre Terminal	Enterprise Blvd.	Blue, Orange	Monday–Sunday	Operates on rapidway from Bayview Ave. to Birchmount Rd.
605	Viva Orange	Martin Grove Rd.	Richmond Hill Centre Terminal	Vaughan Metropolitan Centre TTC station, Promenade Terminal	Blue, Purple	Monday–Sunday	Operates on rapidway from Bruce St. to Yonge St.
607	Viva Yellow	Newmarket Bus Terminal	Highway 404 & Davis Dr. Park & Ride	Newmarket GO Station, Southlake Regional Health Centre	Blue	Monday–Sunday	Operates on rapidway from Yonge St. to Roxborough Rd.

=== On-request services ===
Name	Refs
65+ Service	
Aurora GO	
Kleinburg-Nashville	
Maple-Rutherford GO	
Markham	
North-Central	
Richmond Hill Local	
Stouffville	
Woodbridge	
