= Viva Pink =

Former line on the Viva bus rapid transit system

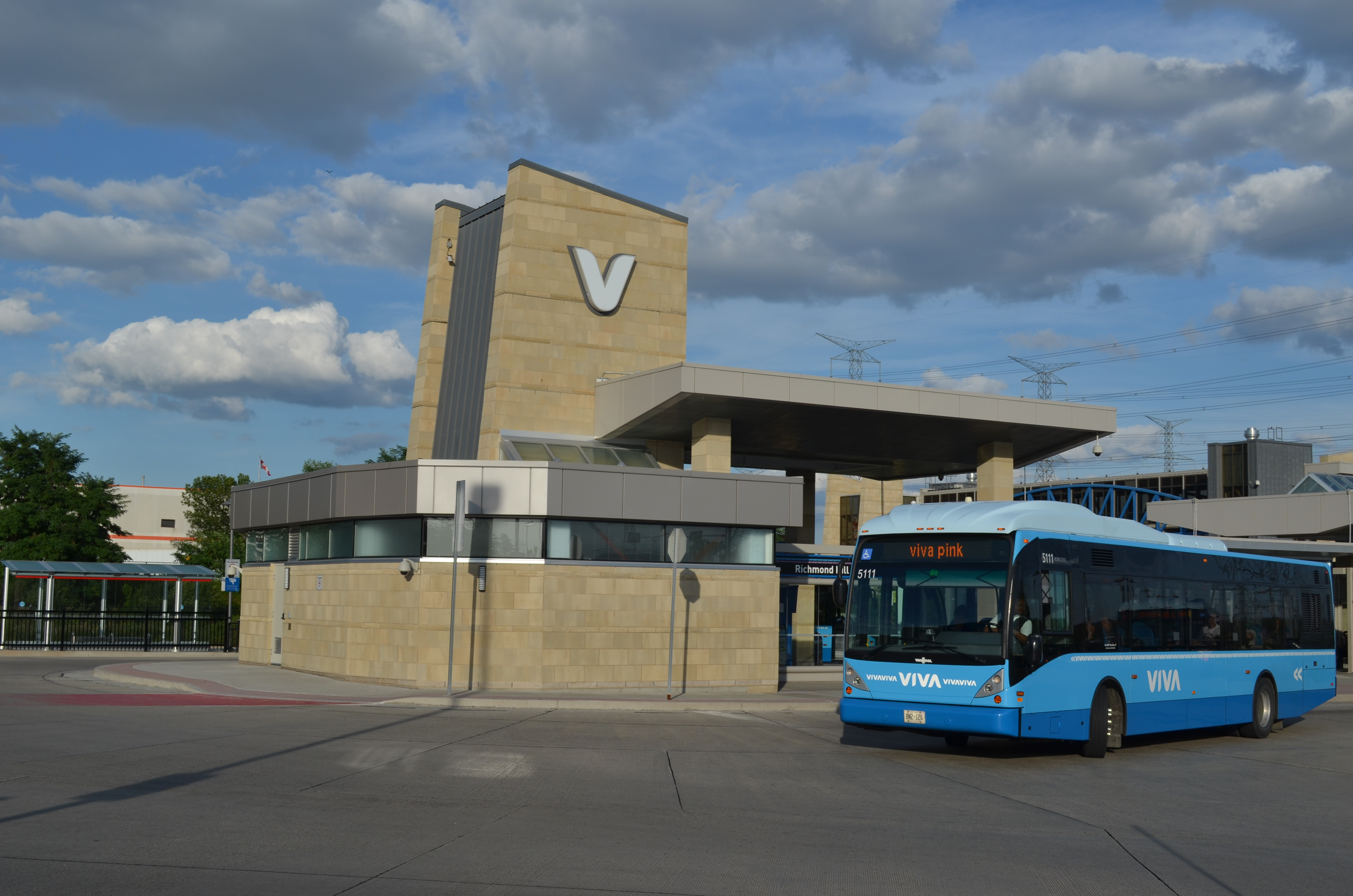
- Viva Pink bus departing Richmond Hill

Overview
- System: YRT/Viva
- Operator: Tok Transit
- Vehicle: Van Hool A330; Van Hool AG300; Nova Bus LF Series (articulated)
- Status: Cancelled
- Began service: January 2, 2006
- Ended service: April 5, 2020

Route
- Route type: Bus rapid transit
- Locale: York Region
- Communities served: Richmond Hill; Markham; Vaughan; North York
- Start: Unionville GO Station
- Via: Richmond Hill Centre
- End: Finch station
- Stops: 21

Service
- Frequency: 15 mins (rush hour only)

Viva Pink is a former Viva bus rapid transit line in York Region, north of Toronto, Ontario, Canada. It was operated by Tok Transit under contract from the Region of York.

Viva Pink was a rush hour only route which overlapped Viva Blue and Viva Purple. Service on the Viva Pink route was suspended during the COVID-19 outbreak. After the official cancellation of Viva Green a year earlier, Viva Pink followed, and was officially cancelled in 2024.

== Route description ==
Viva Pink ran on Yonge Street from Finch to Richmond Hill Centre and then turned east to run along Highway 7 towards Unionville GO Station. Service began on January 2, 2006, lasting until April 5, 2020, and the entire line offered service during peak times only. The route ran parallel to Viva Blue on Yonge Street and to Viva Purple on Highway 7.

== Stations ==
Until its closure in 2020, the line had 21 stations. From southwest to northeast, the stations were:

Viva Pink
Name	Opening date	City	Major connections
Finch Terminal	January 2, 2006	Toronto	Finch station
Steeles	January 2, 2006	Markham/Vaughan	Viva Blue
Clark	January 2, 2006	Markham/Vaughan	Viva Blue
Centre St.	January 2, 2006	Markham/Vaughan	Viva Blue
Royal Orchard	January 2, 2006	Markham/Vaughan	Viva Blue
Richmond Hill Centre	January 2, 2006	Richmond Hill	Langstaff GO
Bayview	January 2, 2006	Markham/Richmond Hill	Viva Purple
Chalmers	August 19, 2013	Markham/Richmond Hill	Viva Purple
Valleymede	January 2, 2006	Markham/Richmond Hill	Viva Purple
West Beaver Creek	January 2, 2006	Markham/Richmond Hill	Viva Purple
Leslie	January 2, 2006	Markham/Richmond Hill	Viva Purple
East Beaver Creek	January 2, 2006	Markham/Richmond Hill	Viva Purple
Allstate Parkway	January 2, 2006	Markham	Viva Purple
Woodbine	January 2, 2006	Markham	Viva Purple
Montgomery	January 2, 2006	Markham	Viva Purple
Town Centre Blvd.	January 2, 2006	Markham	Viva Purple
Cedarland	December 28, 2014	Markham	Viva Purple
Warden	January 2, 2006	Markham	Viva Purple
Post Road	February 5, 2017	Markham	Viva Purple
Enterprise	January 2, 2006	Markham	Viva Purple
Unionville Station	January 2, 2006	Markham	Unionville GO

== Rapidway ==
Viva Pink operated on the Highway 7 Rapidway between Richmond Hill Centre and Post Road stops. The rapidway is expected to be extended to Unionville GO Station in 2021.

A rapidway was proposed to serve the remainder of the route however this project was abandoned in favour of the potential Yonge North subway extension between Finch and Richmond Hill Centre.
