= Box Grove, Ontario =

Box Grove
- Unincorporated community and former hamlet
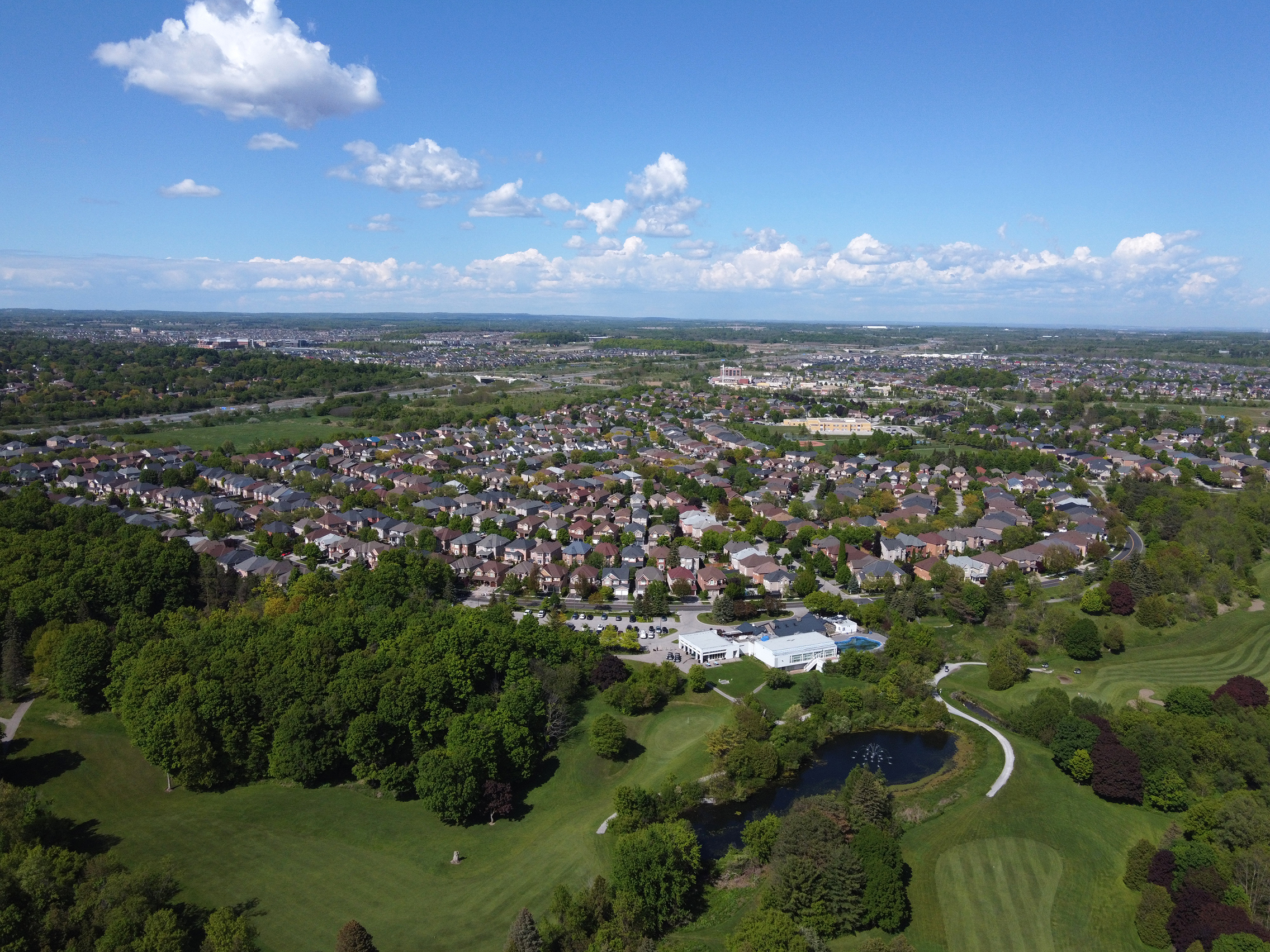
- An aerial view of the Legacy neighbourhood in Box Grove
- Interactive map of Box Grove
- Coordinates: 43°51′29″N 79°13′50″W
- Country: Canada
- Province: Ontario
- Regional municipality: York
- City: Markham

Population (2006)
  - Total: 13,023
- Time zone: UTC-5 (EST)
  - Summer (DST): UTC-4 (EDT)
- Area codes: 905 and 289
- NTS Map: 030M14
- GNBC Code: FALBQ

Box Grove is an unincorporated community and one of the original hamlets of Markham, Ontario.

== History ==
A Middle Iroquoian settlement existed on the west bank of a tributary of the Little Rouge Creek in the fourteenth century in the area which is today called Box Grove. In 1815, William Beebe was the first European settler in this area; Sparta or Sparty-Wharf (Box Grove in 1867) was registered as a hamlet in 1850. The name suggests that at an early date there was boat traffic on the Rouge River. The hamlet changed to its present name during Canada's Confederation in 1867 when it was granted a post office (McCaffrey General Store later as Box Grove General Store moved to what is now Shell Service Station after 1901). The origin of the name is unclear; it may be due to the activity at the box-making woodworking factory, a reference to the many boxwood trees around the hamlet, or linked to the hamlet of Boxgrove in West Sussex, England. In 1867 the hamlet had "a Church, a schoolhouse, two taverns, woolen mill, sawmill, a store, a blacksmith and two axe-makers shops capable of supplying the whole country with axes and augurs on short notice."

The hamlet was the centre of local and small-scale industrial activity. A saw mill, cotton mill wool factory, and "shoddy mill" (for shredding old woolen fabrics for cheaper cloth and stuffing) along the banks of the Rouge River appeared after 1815. The working hamlet had a cheese factory, hotel, and three taverns for a population of 150 (1880); some neighbouring Mennonites had a "pessimistic" view of worldly Sparta, and sought to avoid travel in the hamlet. A Temperance House was opened in the 1860s by Joseph Lathrop on 14th Avenue. By the end of the nineteenth century the mills had closed (victims of floods and fire), and the White Rose Hotel and Tavern also closed its doors by 1910 (later replaced by residential dwellings and located at what is now 6788 14th Avenue). While industry disappeared in Box Grove, the hamlet remained. The Box Grove General Store (6772 14th Avenue c. 1860), Box Grove Church (2 Legacy Drive c. 1870) and Box Grove Schoolhouse, S.S. #18 (7651 9th Line c.1870), are the only reminders of the once-vibrant hamlet (the Tomlinson family is buried in the church's graveyard). Many homes along 9th Line from north and south of 14th Avenue date to the mid to late 19th Century.

A few prominent families were part of Box Grove:

- Burkholder - one of the last remaining Mennonite families in the area.
- Tomlinson - early settler and operator of the saw and woolen mills in the hamlet
- Raymer - John Nobel Raymer (1837-1874) a Mennonite farmer, and later his son Frank, operated a cheese factory. Abraham Raymer operated a sawmill farther down the Rouge.
- Reesor - Peter Reesor operated saw and grist mills along Little Rouge River
- Rolph - soldier Captain William Rolph (commanding officer of 12th York Regiment) settled in the area and became a dairy farmer.
- McCaffrey - David McCaffrey was postmaster and general store owner

Today, Box Grove has undergone a transformation from protected agricultural land to residential and commercial use. Box Grove is located in the area around Ninth Line (Connecting to Box Grove By-Pass) and 14th Avenue. Residential development began in the late 1990s and continues today.

In 1950 the Box Grove Golf course was built by businessman Nelson Davis on the Tomlinson property which included a portion of the Rouge River valley where their mills were located. One of the Tomlinsons was buried on the site and the golf course was built leaving the grave and headstone intact. In 1953, Nelson invited Arnold Palmer to play his course. Arnold apparently shot an 82 and declared it to be one of the toughest courses he had ever played. Davis built a lovely stone clubhouse which included a locker room with beautiful wooden lockers. In 1967, IBM purchased the golf course primarily for use by its employees. The golf facility included a 9-hole par 3 course and the tough 18-hole course, 9 holes in the valley and 9 holes on the flat ground on the north side of the valley. In 1997, IBM sold part of the course to Minto for a residential development called Legacy and the Town of Markham took ownership of the valley portion of the course which is now called Markham Green Golf Club. The original clubhouse has been modified extensively, first by IBM then by the Town and is now an attractive community centre. The Tomlinson grave was moved to the Box Grove Church graveyard and the original gravesite now on the south side of Legacy Drive is marked with a stone monument.

The Box Grove post office was lost in the early 20th century. The current post office is located inside the Rexall pharmacy at Ninth Line and Copper Creek Drive.

== Neighbourhoods in Box Grove ==
Within Box Grove there are two distinct residential developments (neighborhoods) built from the former IBM Canada Golf Course, but are not historically considered as communities:

- Legacy - Small neighborhood with no commercial development (other than the Shell gas station). It has 2 trails and a K–8 school named Legacy Public School (A York Region District School Board school). The school and neighbourhood is located west of 9th Line, north of 14th Avenue, east of Markham Road and south of Highway 407.
- Rouge-Fairways - 2 neighbourhoods managed as one; it has a trail, church, and 2 K–8 schools. The first school is Boxwood Public School (a YRDSB school; located at the south side) while the second school is Sir Richard W. Scott Catholic Elementary School (A York Catholic District School Board managed school; located towards the north side). The neighborhood is located west of 9th Line, north and south of 14th Avenue, just east of Markham Road and north of Parkview Golf and Country Club

== Transportation ==
Despite the proximity to Cornell Bus Terminal, many individuals prefer to use cars due to the fact that York Region Transit (the transit agency of this area) has inconsistent, inconvenient and infrequent service in the community (due to the limited service provided). Bus routes running through Box Grove include: 1-Highway 7 (Richmond Hill Centre Terminal to Cornell Bus Terminal, 2-Milliken (weekends only, Finch GO Bus Terminal to Cornell Bus Terminal), 9-9th Line (Whitchurch-Stouffville to 14th Avenue), 14 14th Avenue (weekdays only, Woodbine Avenue to Cornell Bus Terminal), 305-Box Grove Express (5-8AM and 3-8PM, weekdays only from Finch GO Bus Terminal to Cornell Bus Terminal) as well as the YRT school routes 411 & 416 for Markham D.H.S. and 401 for St. Brother André C.H.S. The routes to and from MDHS have experienced major overcrowding issues due to inadequate bus service being provided by the YRT.

As a part of the YRT 2026 Transit Plan, the YRT is also proposing a new route 19 to replace 2-milliken and increase access to Steeles Ave E (connecting to 53-Steeles E, 953-Steeles Express & 353-Steeles Night Service) on one end whilst connecting to Cornell Bus Terminal. In between these, route 19 directly connects to 2-milliken (to Finch GO Bus Terminal), 102 to Warden station and 102D to Major Mackenzie Drive, 14-14th Avenue (to Woodbine Avenue and Cornell Terminal) and 9-9th Line (to Whitchurch-Stouffville and 14th Avenue). The YRT has not yet confirmed if or when this route will operate.

For disabled individuals or for individuals in an area far from a bus route, YRT operates a rideshare service (YRT On-Request) to allow people to get bus service from their front doors to a YRT bus stop with an active bus route. This service is operated with Minivans and Minibuses.

For driving, the Highway 407 serves the area from the Ninth Line interchange; however there is no access onto eastbound Highway 407 from Ninth Line northbound. This has been an ongoing problem for most Box Grove residents who tries to go east on the highway as access to the Highway 407 eastbound is limited.

== Parks and Recreation ==
Luenta Gardens is named former name of the park (formerly Luneta Park and now Rizal Park) in Manila where Jose Rizal is buried. The small park also has a statue of Rizal.

Other parks in the area includes:

- Box Grove Community Park
- Bob Hunter Memorial Park (Rouge National Urban Park)
- Collingham Parkette
- Fieldside Mariette
- McCreight Parkette
- William Beebe Parkette
- Riverwalk Park
- Roxbury Park
- Tomlinson Park
- Napier Simpson Park
- Old Mill Pond Park
- Legacy Park
- Vettese Park

=== Box Grove Community Centre ===
Box Grove Community Centre at 7651 9th Line is housed in the old Box Grove Schoolhouse (S.S. #18) built around 1870. Renovated with two additions to the original school house, it has 2 rooms and home a co-operative day care centre. There is also an outdoor pool that operates during the summer months.

Outside is small grass area and two tennis courts.

The community centre historic school house is twin of Cedar Grove Community Centre, formerly Cedar Grove Schoolhouse (S.S. #20) c. 1869.

== Films shot at Box Grove ==
- The 1974 film, Sunday in the Country, starring Ernest Borgnine was filmed partially at the Box Grove United Church.
