= Bernard Terminal =

Bus station in Richmond Hill, Ontario, Canada

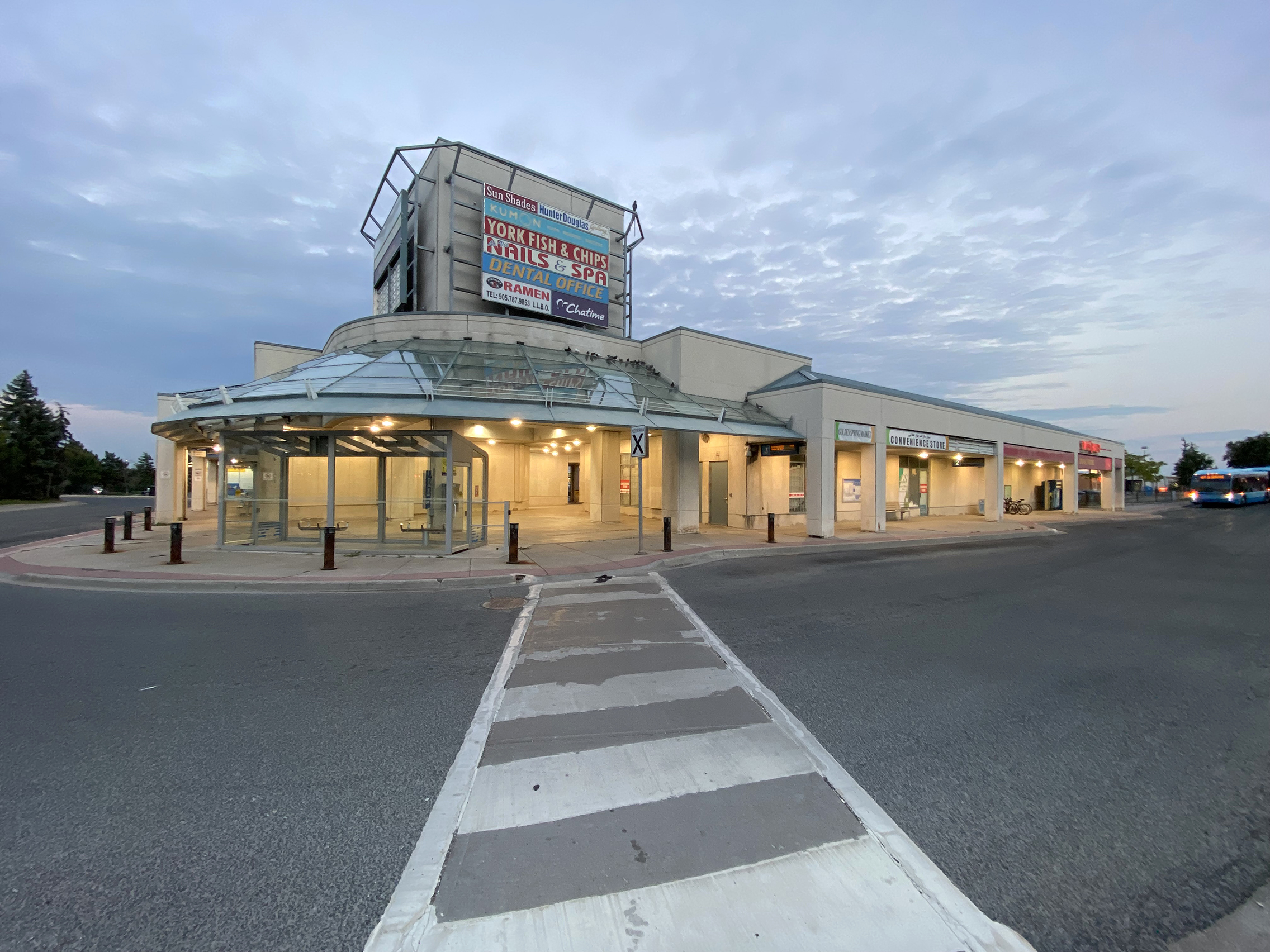

General information
- Location: 10909 Yonge Street, Richmond Hill, ON
- Coordinates: 43°53′40.7″N 79°26′31.6″W
- Owner: Regional Municipality of York
- Operator: York Region Transit
- Bus routes: YRT routes: 81 Inspiration; 83 Trench; 86 Newkirk–Red Maple; 98 Yonge; 99 Yonge; Viva Blue
- Bus stands: 6 + 4 on-street stops

History
- Opened: 1996
Location

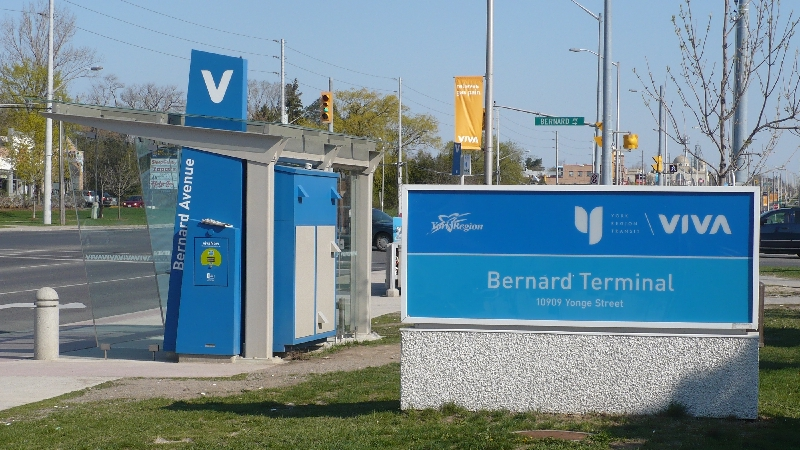
Bernard Vivastation on Yonge Street adjoining the terminal

Bernard Terminal is a small bus station in York Region, Ontario, Canada, located at 11000 Yonge Street. It is on the west side of a mall on the southeast corner of Bernard Avenue and Yonge Street in the town of Richmond Hill, Ontario, one city block north of Elgin Mills Road.

It replaced the previous bus loop at the north end of the Richmond Heights Centre, that was used after the former Toronto Transit Commission loop was replaced by GO Transit Yonge 'C' Buses in the 1970s, until the late 1990s.

The bus terminal land, formerly owned by the Town of Richmond Hill, was conveyed to York Region in 2005, since the responsibility for public transit now belonged to the Region.

It presently serves York Region Transit (YRT) routes 81 (Inspiration), 83 (Trench), 86 (Newkirk-Red Maple), 98 (Yonge), and 99 (Yonge), Viva Blue service; previously other routes served this stop, including the 84A/C Oak Ridges route.

During the first and second stages of Viva's launch (launched on September 4, 2005, and October 16, 2005, respectively), Bernard Terminal served as the northernmost last stop of the Viva Blue line. On November 20, 2005, the line was extended northward to Newmarket Bus Terminal, relegating Bernard to a large intermediate stop.

Currently, half of the Viva Blue buses from Finch Bus Terminal short turns here.

The terminal consists of a series of partially covered platforms, Viva kiosk and fenced off driveway.

== Bus service ==
Bernard is the terminus and division point for the 98 Yonge and 99 Yonge routes and on weekday and Sunday, additional Viva Blue service to Finch Bus Terminal also originates here. Regular Viva service, operating between Newmarket Bus Terminal and Finch Bus Terminal, stops on Yonge Street beside the terminal. Similarly the 83 Trench route has its stop on the south side of Bernard Avenue, north of the terminal.

=== Platform assignments ===
- Platform 1: Unloading/layover only
- Platform 2: Viva Blue southbound
- Platform 3: 86 Newkirk–Red Maple
- Platform 4: 81 Inspiration
- Platform 5: 98 Yonge
- Platform 6: 99 Yonge
- Bernard Avenue South Side: 83 Trench
- Yonge Street East Side: Viva Blue northbound, 98/99 Yonge
- Yonge Street West Side: Viva Blue southbound, 98/99 Yonge
