= Stephen Lewis Secondary School =

Stephen Lewis Secondary School may refer to:

- Stephen Lewis Secondary School (Mississauga), in Mississauga, Ontario, Canada
- Stephen Lewis Secondary School (Vaughan), in Thornhill, Ontario, Canada
