= Unionville GO Station =

Railway station in Markham, Ontario, Canada

Unionville
- Station building in 2025

General information
- Location: 155 YMCA Boulevard; Markham, Ontario; Canada
- Coordinates: 43°51′06″N 79°18′52″W
- Owner: Metrolinx
- Platforms: 1 side platform 1 island platform
- Tracks: 3
- Bus routes: 40M 52 56 71
- Connections: York Region Transit; Viva Purple

Construction
- Structure type: Station building with public washroom and waiting room
- Parking: 1620 spaces
- Cycle facilities: Rack
- Accessible: yes

Other information
- Station code: GO Transit: UI
- Fare zone: 71

History
- Opened: 1991
- Rebuilt: 2005

Passengers
- Apr–Jul 2019: 204,700 ▼5.6%

Services
Preceding station	GO Transit	Following station
Milliken towards Union	Stouffville	Centennial towards Old Elm
Former services at CN station
Preceding station	Canadian National Railway	Following station
Millikens toward Toronto	Toronto – Belleville via Peterboro	Markham toward Belleville
Millikens toward Toronto	Toronto – Port Hope via Peterboro	Markham toward Port Hope
Location

Unionville GO Station is a train and bus station in the GO Transit network located in Markham, Ontario, Canada. It is a stop on the Stouffville line. The station is also served by Highway 407 East Express buses, which run westbound to Highway 407 Bus Terminal, northbound to Mount Joy GO Station, and eastbound to Oshawa GO Station.

By late May 2022, the station had acquired a second track, a turnaround track and an island platform to support future all-day, two-way service on the Stouffville line. In the future, GO trains will run every 10 minutes to Unionville and every 30 minutes to Mount Joy GO Station.

== History ==
=== Old Unionville station ===
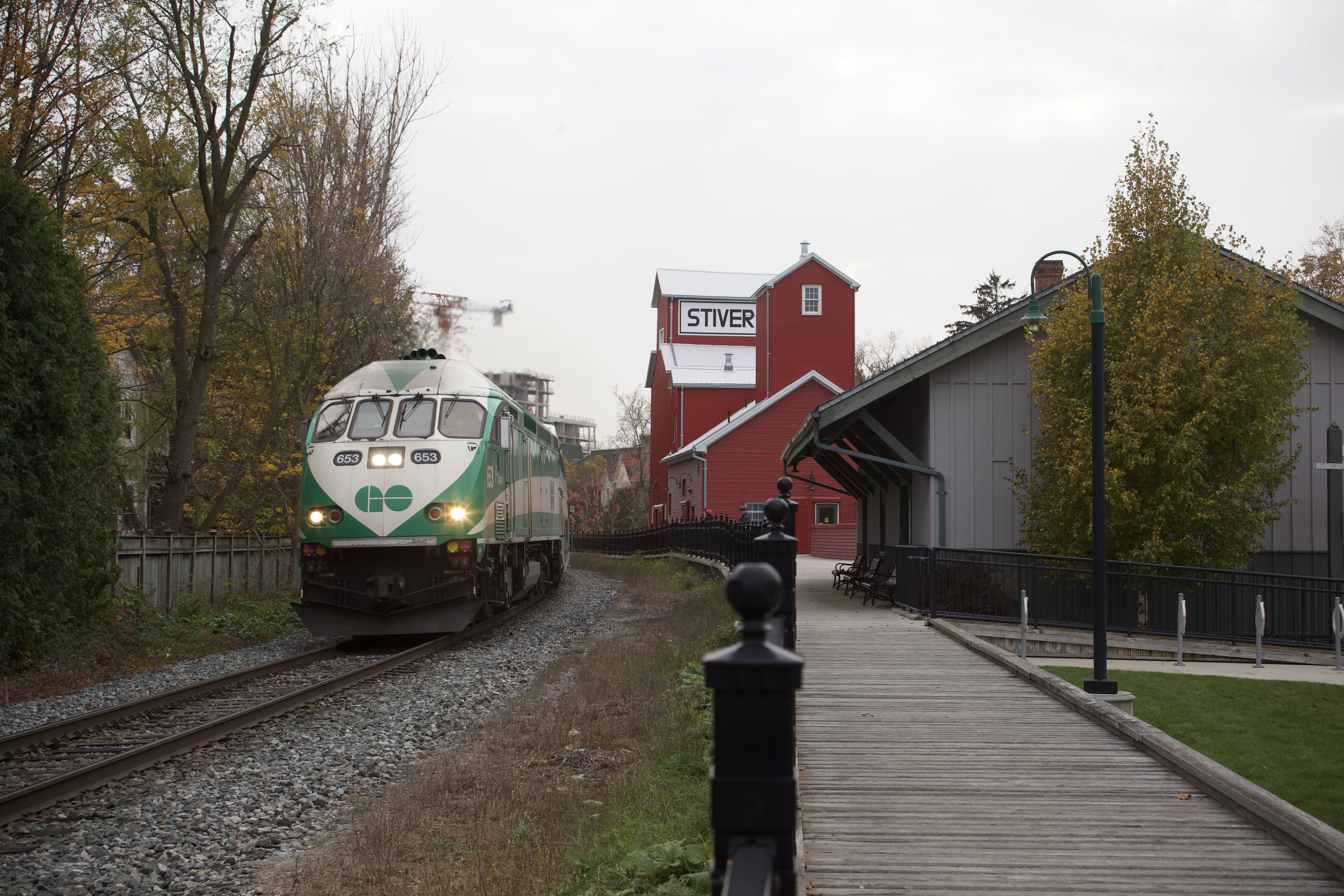
The original Unionville station, closed in 1991

The original Unionville station was opened in 1871 by the Toronto and Nipissing Railway. The railway line and station were acquired in succession by the Midland Railway of Canada in 1882, the Grand Trunk Railway in 1884 and Canadian National Railway in 1923. Canadian National served the station until 1978; GO Transit used the station from 1982 to 1991. GO train service ended at the station on Friday May 3, 1991, and service began at the current GO station the following Monday, May 6.

The old station building has been restored and is now used as a community centre. Like Markham GO Station, this station features classic Canadian Railway Style with elements of Vernacular Carpenter Gothic architecture of the 19th Century. It is located on Station Lane, near Main Street Unionville. While a platform exists it is fenced off from the rail line to indicate it is not an operational station.

=== Current station ===
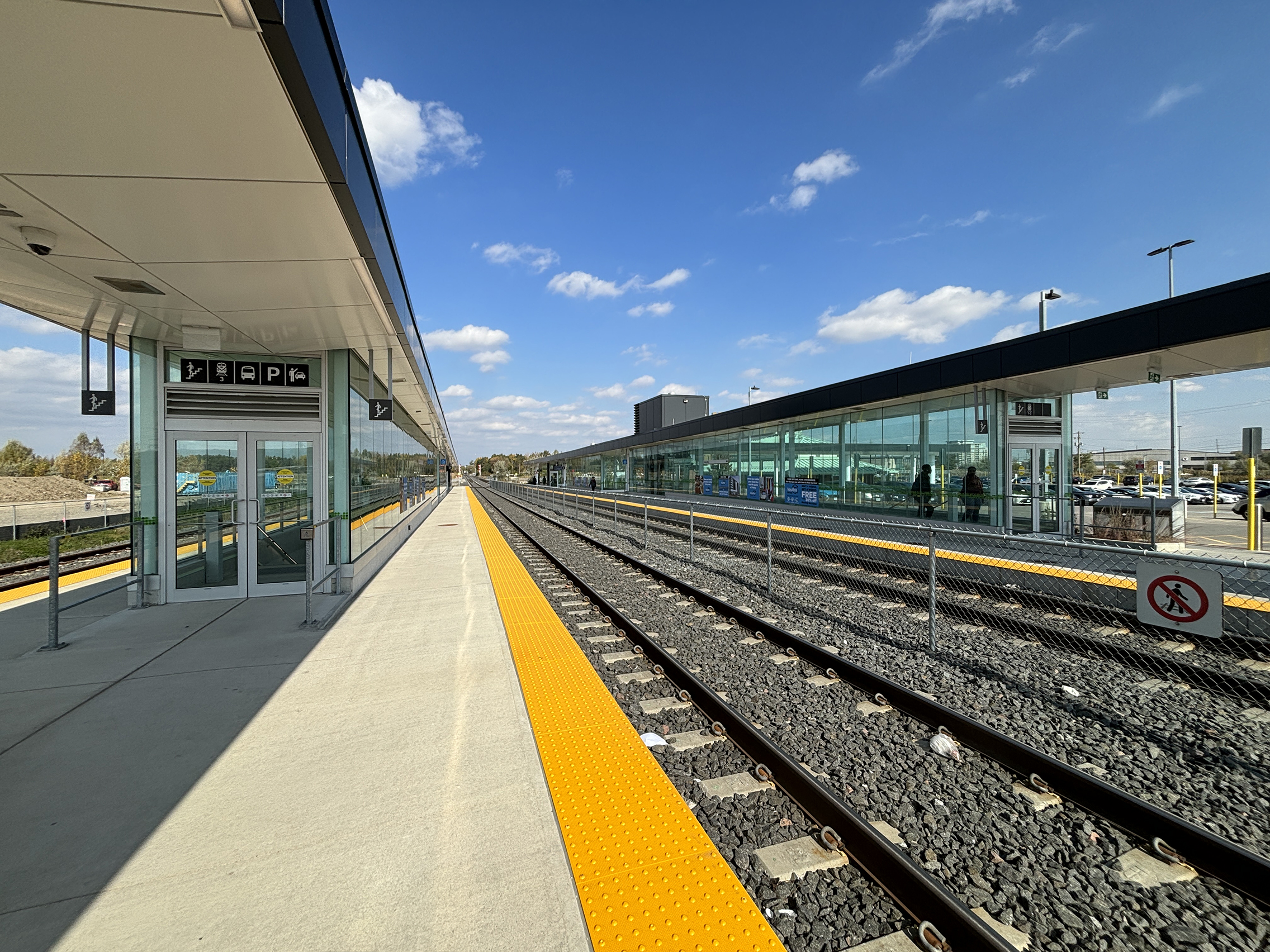
Unionville GO Station platform

The current station was built in 1991 to replace the old Unionville Station. The newer station was renovated and re-opened in April 2005 and accessed by a service road from Kennedy Road north of Highway 407. It is adjacent to York University's Markham Campus, which opened in 2024.

By the end of May 2022, Metrolinx had completed a number of station improvements as part of GO Expansion to support future all-day, two-way service on the Stouffville line. The improvements include:

- A second track, new platform and a turnaround track.
- A new island platform and a relocated east platform, both with canopies, shelters and a snow-melting system.
- New pedestrian tunnels and elevators.
- 286 additional parking spots.
- Pedestrian walkways through the parking lot.
- New ramps from the parking lot to the platforms.
- More bicycle storage.

Beginning August 2026, the station's parking lot and roadways began serving as the epicentre of the annual Honda IndyCar Series at Markham Centre. As a result, additional GO train trips were introduced between Unionville and Union to pull in crowds from the City of Toronto.

== Connecting bus routes ==
=== GO Transit ===
- 40M Hamilton/Richmond Hill (Hamilton GO Centre - Unionville GO) (weekdays only)
- 52 Oshawa/Oakville (Oshawa GO Station - Highway 407 Bus Terminal) (weekends only)
- 52A Oshawa/Oakville (Highway 407 Bus Terminal - Baldwin St. @ Hwy. 407 Park & Ride) (weekdays only)
- 56 Oshawa/Oakville (Oakville GO Station - Oshawa GO Station) (weekdays only)
- 56A Oshawa/Oakville (Square One - Oshawa GO Station) (weekday express)
- 56C Oshawa/Oakville (Oakville GO Station - Unionville GO) (weekdays only)
- 70 Stouffville (Uxbridge - Unionville GO) (One southbound trip, weekdays only)
- 71 Stouffville ("Train-bus" for Stouffville Line when trains do not operate)

=== York Region Transit ===
- 8 Kennedy
- Viva Purple (at University Boulevard)

Viva service began on October 16, 2005, with buses stopping near Kennedy Road. Because the nearby Enterprise Drive was not finished when Viva services in the area began, this station served as a temporary station until November 19, 2005. During this time, both Viva Purple and Viva Green buses had to go on a detour on Highway 407 nearby. Viva Pink services were added on January 2, 2006.

Unionville was the eastern terminus of the now defunct Viva Pink service to Richmond Hill Centre and Finch Bus Terminal.
