= Viva Blue =

Line on the Viva bus rapid transit system

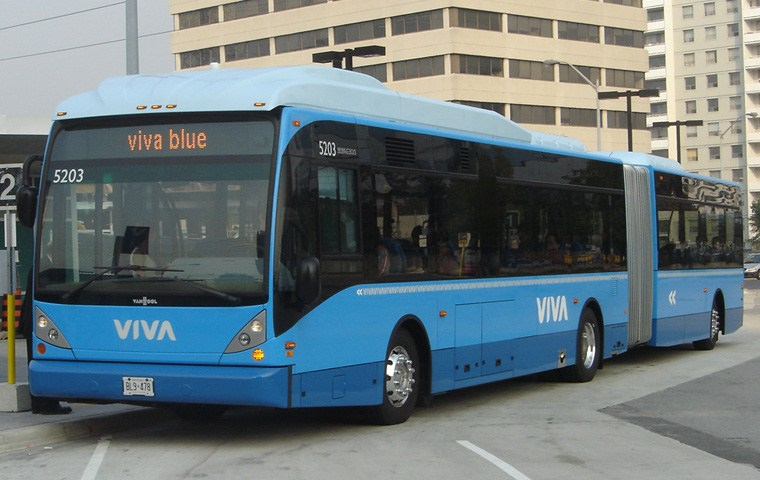

Overview
- System: YRT/Viva
- Operator: Miller Transit
- Vehicle: Nova Bus LFS Artic, New Flyer XD60
- Began service: September 4, 2005

Routes
- Routes: 4
- Locale: York Region
- Communities served: Newmarket; Aurora; Richmond Hill; Markham; Vaughan; North York
- Start: Newmarket Bus Terminal
- Via: Bernard Terminal, Richmond Hill Centre Terminal
- End: Finch Bus Terminal
- Length: 31.9 kilometres (19.8 mi)
- Stops: 27

Service
- Frequency: 15 mins north of Bernard Terminal; 7.5 mins south of Bernard Terminal
- Weekend frequency: 20 mins north of Bernard Terminal; 10 mins south of Bernard Terminal
- Ridership: 18,402 (2019)

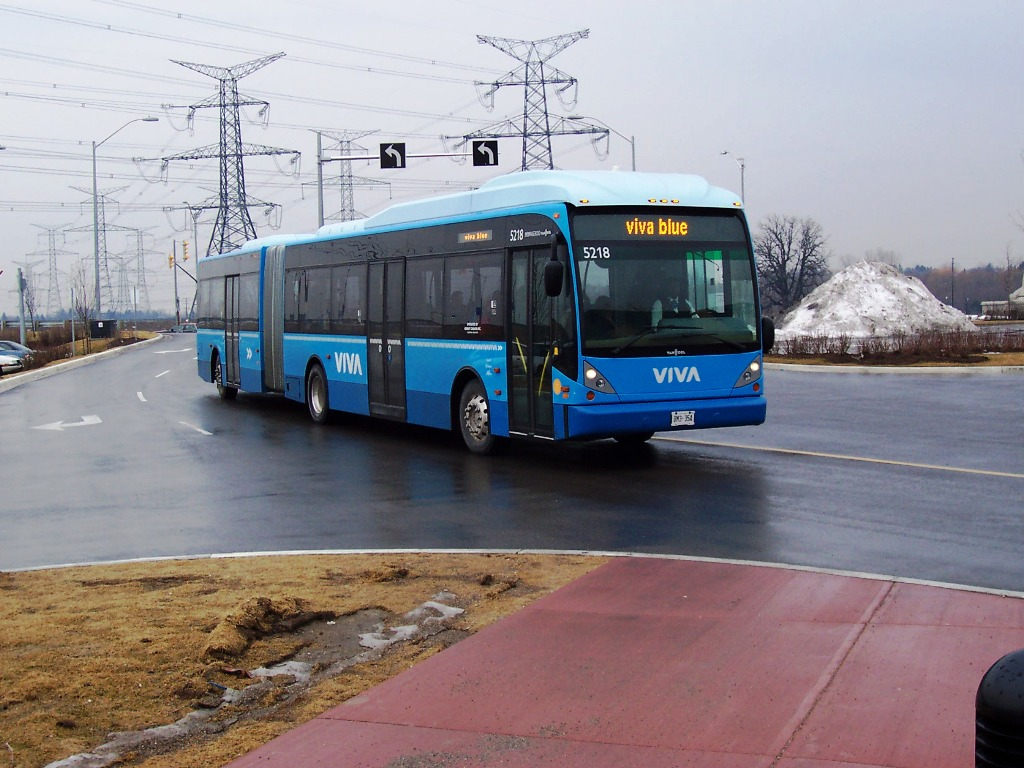
A Viva Blue bus enters the Richmond Hill Centre station.

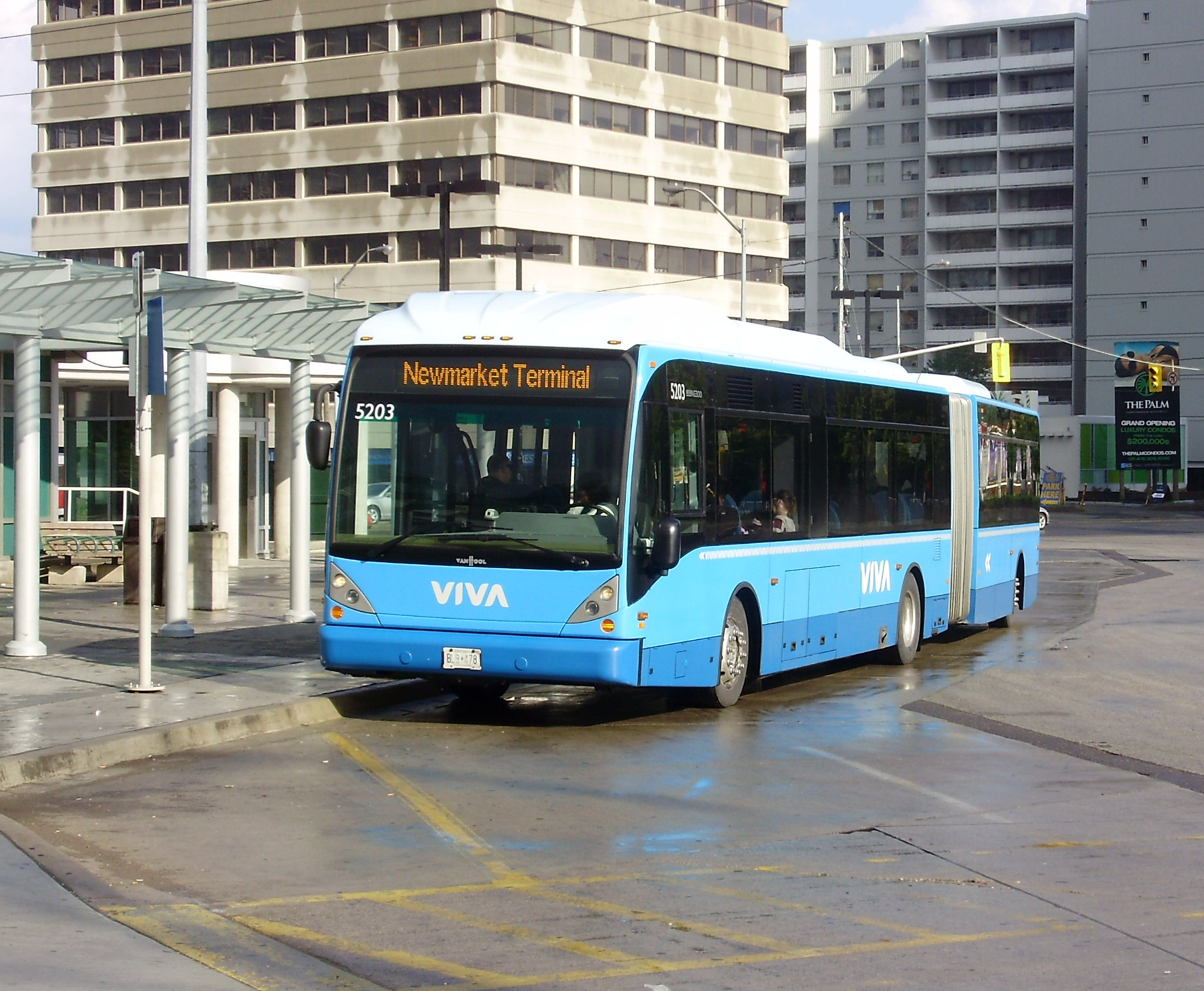
Viva Blue bus at Finch Bus Terminal, bound for Newmarket

Viva Blue is a BRT line on the Viva bus rapid transit system in York Region, located north of Toronto, Ontario, Canada. It is operated by Tok Transit, under contract from York Region Transit. This is the busiest bus route in the York Region Transit network.

== List of stations ==
There are 27 stops/terminals on Viva Blue. From north to south they are:

Viva Blue
| Name | Opening date | City / Town | Major connections |
| Newmarket Terminal | November 20, 2005 | Newmarket | Viva Yellow GO Transit bus services |
| Davis | January 5, 2020 | Newmarket | |
| Eagle | November 20, 2005 | Newmarket | |
| Mulock | November 20, 2005 | Newmarket | |
| Savage | September 6, 2009 | Newmarket | |
| Orchard Heights | November 20, 2005 | Aurora | |
| Wellington | November 20, 2005 | Aurora | |
| Golf Links | November 20, 2005 | Aurora | |
| Henderson | November 20, 2005 | Aurora | |
| Bloomington | November 20, 2005 | Aurora/Richmond Hill | |
| Regatta | February 23, 2014 | Richmond Hill | |
| King | November 20, 2005 | Richmond Hill | |
| Jefferson | November 16, 2008 | Richmond Hill | |
| 19th–Gamble | November 20, 2005 | Richmond Hill | |
| Bernard Terminal | September 4, 2005 | Richmond Hill | |
| Elgin Mills | September 4, 2005 | Richmond Hill | |
| Crosby | September 4, 2005 | Richmond Hill | |
| Major Mackenzie | September 4, 2005 | Richmond Hill | |
| Weldrick | September 4, 2005 | Richmond Hill | |
| 16th–Carrville | September 4, 2005 | Richmond Hill | |
| Bantry–Scott | September 4, 2005 | Richmond Hill | |
| Richmond Hill Centre | September 4, 2005 | Richmond Hill | Langstaff GO |
| Royal Orchard | September 4, 2005 | Markham/Vaughan | |
| Centre St. | September 4, 2005 | Markham/Vaughan | |
| Clark | September 4, 2005 | Markham/Vaughan | |
| Steeles | September 4, 2005 | Markham/Vaughan | |
| Finch Terminal | September 4, 2005 | North York | Finch |

== History ==
Service from Finch station to Bernard began on September 4, 2005. Service north of Bernard to Newmarket Terminal began November 20, 2005.

There is a Viva Blue short turn route operating from Finch station to Bernard. According to the original environmental assessments, it is also known as the Finch–Richmond Hill line.

Previously there was a Viva Blue 'A' branch which operated between Newmarket Terminal, and Finch Terminal while bypassing Richmond Hill Centre. This was a rush hour branch only. The 'A' branch was suspended in April 2020, due to low ridership, caused by the COVID-19 pandemic. In September 2023, York Region Transit announced that the 'A' branch would not be returning to service.

On November 3, 2024, the branch operating between Bernard Terminal and Finch GO Bus Terminal was named as Viva Blue 'B'.

=== Future ===
In the future, Viva Blue will have its own dedicated rapidway for most of the route between Newmarket Bus Terminal and Richmond Hill Centre Terminal. The first phase of the Yonge Street Rapidway opened in January 2020 and the second phase in December 2020. There are also plans to extend the bus route northeast to East Gwillimbury GO Station along Yonge Street and Green Lane. Eventually, the entire portion of rapidway could also be upgraded to allow light rail transit on this corridor.

Originally, the southern portion of the Yonge Street rapidway was to be implemented from 19th Avenue to Finch station, but since the announcement of MoveOntario 2020 by the Ontario provincial government, proposals of the portion of rapidway from Richmond Hill Centre to Finch station have been shelved for the proposed north extension of Line 1 Yonge–University.

== See also ==
- Viva Rapid Transit
- Yonge Street
