= Finch Bus Terminal =

Bus terminal in Toronto, Ontario, Canada

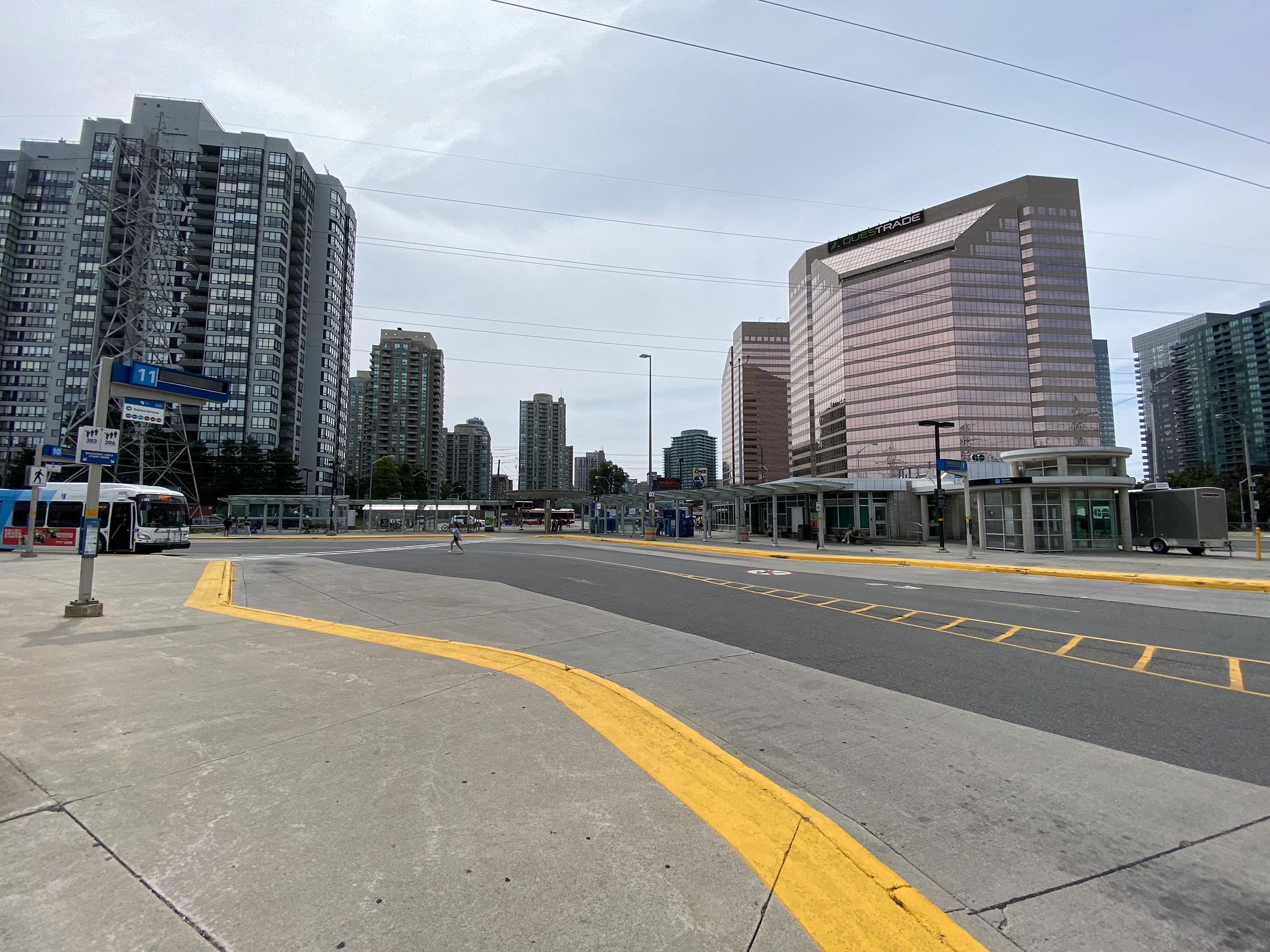

General information
- Location: 5697 Yonge Street; Toronto, Ontario; Canada
- Coordinates: 43°46′56″N 79°24′56″W
- Owner: Hydro One / Metrolinx
- Platforms: 18
- Bus routes: YRT/Viva buses: 2 Miliken; 5 Clark; 23 Thornhill Woods; 77 Highway 7; 88 Bathurst; 91 Bayview; 99 Yonge; 300 Business Express; 301 Markham Express; 302 Unionville Express; 303 Bur Oak Express; 304 Mount Joy Express; 305 Box Grove Express; 360 Vaughan Mills/Wonderland; Viva Blue; GO buses: 19 Mississauga/North York; 27 Milton/North York; 32 Brampton Trinity Common/North York; 67 Keswick/North York; 92A Oshawa/Yorkdale; 96 Oshawa/Finch Express
- Bus operators: York Region Transit; GO Transit
- Connections: at Finch station

Construction
- Parking: 1,683 paid spaces
- Cycle facilities: Yes
- Accessible: Yes

Other information
- Station code: GO Transit: 00736
- Fare zone: GO Transit Zone 5

History
- Opened: 1974
- Rebuilt: 2005
Location

Finch Bus Terminal is a bus terminal in Toronto, Ontario, Canada. It serves to connect the transit services of York Region to the north and the transit services of Toronto. It is located at 5697 Yonge Street on the northeast corner of Bishop Avenue and Yonge Street, one block north of Finch Avenue, connected by tunnel to Finch subway station. The station facilities, constructed by GO Transit, are within a major east-west electricity transmission corridor owned by Hydro One Networks.

Transit agencies that use the terminal are GO Transit and York Region Transit/Viva.

The terminal was built by the Toronto Transit Commission in 1974, and was acquired by the Toronto Area Transportation Operating Authority in March 1977.

An elevator and new platforms were added in mid-2005 to accommodate Viva bus rapid transit service, which York Region Transit began operating on September 4, 2005. It is the southern terminus of the Viva Blue route. New shelters were added along the south platform to replace the smaller shelters to accommodate more passengers waiting for buses at the terminal.

Platforms for GO Transit and York Region Transit remain unchanged until September 2012. The platform next to the station, formerly for GO Transit buses was rebuilt and lowered for Viva buses.

Inside is a newsstand, washrooms and indoor Viva kiosks. A set of escalators connects to the Finch TTC station across the street. A set of covered stairs on the south side of the station also connects to Finch.

The east of the platforms and next to the TTC east parking lot is a parking area for 13 standard buses (30–40 foot buses). Passenger pickups by taxis can be made from the taxi stand on the southeast side of the station next to Bishop Avenue, an off-street driveway.

== Bus service ==
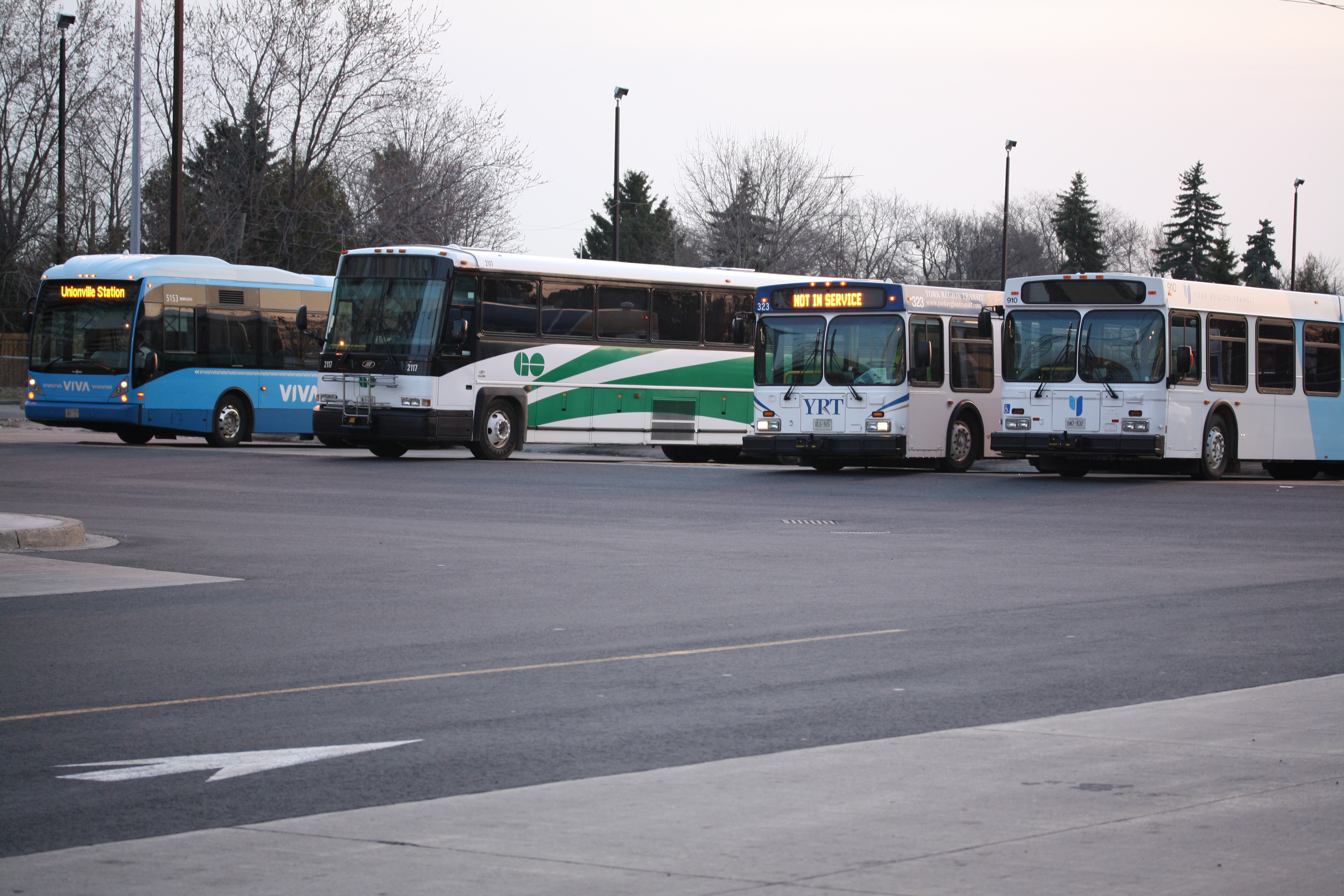
Viva, GO and YRT buses

YRT, which also operates the Viva bus rapid transit routes, as well as TTC, and GO Transit routes, connect to the terminal.

Agency	Type	Colour
York Region Transit	BRT	Viva Rapid Transit
York Region Transit	Regular	2
York Region Transit	Express	300
GO Transit	Regular	19A

=== York Region Transit ===
Platform number	Route		Direction	Destination
1	Unused			
2		Viva Blue	NB	Newmarket GO Bus Terminal via Richmond Hill Centre Terminal
12	2	Milliken	EB	Denison and Markham Road; Cornell Terminal (weekends only)
14	5	Clark	WB	Clark and Dufferin
16	23	Thornhill Woods	NB	Teston Road and Via Romano
10	77	Highway 7	WB	Queen and Highway 50
15	88	Bathurst	NB	Seneca College King Campus
3	91	Bayview	NB	Subrisco Avenue
8	98	Yonge	NB	Newmarket GO Bus Terminal
8	99	Yonge	NB	Newmarket GO Bus Terminal
11	300	Business Express	EB	Clegg Road and Rodick Road via Seneca College Markham Campus
11	301	Markham Express	EB	Mount Joy GO Station via Markham GO Station
11	302	Unionville Express	NB	Warden Avenue and Baycliffe Road
11	303	Bur Oak Express	EB	Mount Joy GO Station via Markham-Stouffville Hospital
11	304	Mount Joy Express	EB	Mount Joy GO Station via Enterprise Boulevard
11	305	Box Grove Express	EB	Markham Road and Highway 407 via Donald Cousens Parkway
16	360	Vaughan Mills/Wonderland	NB	Canada's Wonderland via Richmond Hill Centre Terminal via Vaughan Mills
13	Dropoffs Only			
18	Dropoffs Only			

=== GO Transit ===
Platform Number	Route		Direction	Destination	Destination	Destination	Destination	Destination	Destination	Destination
4	19	Mississauga-North York	WB	Yonge Street and Sheppard	Yorkdale Bus Terminal	Keele Street and Highway 401	Renforth	Dixie	Square One Bus Terminal	
4	19C	Mississauga-North York	WB	Yonge Street and Sheppard	Square One Bus Terminal					
4	27	Milton-North York	WB	Yonge Street and Sheppard	Yorkdale Bus Terminal	Keele Street and Highway 401	Meadowvale GO Station	Meadowvale Town Centre	Milton GO Station	
4	27A	Milton-North York	WB	Yonge Street and Sheppard	Yorkdale Bus Terminal	Keele Street and Highway 401	Syntex Crt and Financial Dr	Meadowvale GO	Meadowvale Town Centre	Milton GO
4	27C	Milton-North York	WB	Yonge Street and Sheppard	Meadowvale GO	Meadowvale Town Centre	Milton GO			
4	27F	Milton-North York	WB	Yonge Street and Sheppard	Yorkdale Bus Terminal	Keele Street and Highway 401	Syntex Crt and Financial Dr	Meadowvale GO		
3	67	Keswick-North York	NB	Yonge Street and Sheppard	Major Mackenzie and 404 GO Park and Ride	Wellington and 404 GO Park and Ride	Davis and 404 GO Park and Ride	Queensville and 404 GO Park and Ride	Woodbine and 404 GO Park and Ride	
6	96	Oshawa-Finch Express	EB	Yonge Street and Sheppard	Ajax GO Station	Whitby GO Station	Oshawa GO Station			
6	96B	Oshawa-Finch Express	EB	Yonge Street and Sheppard	Scarborough Town Centre	Ajax GO	Whitby GO	Oshawa GO		
6	96C	Oshawa-Finch Express	EB	Yonge Street and Sheppard	Ajax GO					
6	96D	Oshawa-Finch Express	EB	Yonge Street and Sheppard	Whitby GO	Oshawa GO				
6	96E	Oshawa-Finch Express	EB	Yonge Street and Sheppard	Scarborough Town Centre					
9	32	Brampton Trinity Common-North York	WB	Yonge Street and Langstaff Road East	Bramalea GO Station	Williams and 410 GO Park and Ride	Trinity Commons Terminal			
9	32A	Brampton Trinity Common-North York	WB	Yonge Street and Langstaff Road East	Bramalea GO Station					
9	32B	Brampton Trinity Common-North York	WB	Yonge Street and Langstaff Road East	Bramalea GO Station	Bramalea Terminal				
Yonge Street and Hendon Ave.	32	Brampton Trinity Common-North York	EB	Yonge Street and Sheppard	York Mills Station					
Yonge Street and Hendon Ave.	32A	Brampton Trinity Common-North York	EB	Yonge Street and Sheppard	York Mills Station					
Yonge Street and Hendon Ave.	32B	Brampton Trinity Common-North York	EB	Yonge Street and Sheppard	York Mills Station					

=== TTC ===
For Toronto Transit Commission bus connections, see the adjoining Finch subway station

Notes:

- Tai Pan Tours and Safeway Tours use platform 17 and stops along Bishop Avenue respectively to pick up and drop off patrons for tours and the shuttle to Fallsview Casino.
- Brampton Transit stopped service to Finch in 2010 with the introduction of their 501 Züm Queen. Previously Brampton Transit buses operated to Finch as part of the Route 77 service that was jointly operated with York Region Transit.
