= Richmond Green Secondary School =

Location
- 1 William F. Bell Pkwy; Richmond Hill, Ontario, L4S 2T9; Canada; 43°54′13″N 79°23′50″W

Information
- School type: Public school
- Motto: Where tomorrow begins
- Religious affiliation: Secular
- Founded: 2005
- School board: York Region District School Board
- Superintendent: Erik Khilji
- Area trustee: Cindy Liang
- School number: 964809
- Principal: Daraius Bharucha
- Grades: 9 to 12
- Enrolment: 1,056 (October 2025)
- Language: English
- Mascot: Rattlers
- Website: www.richmondgreen.ss.yrdsb.ca
- Last updated: May 2026

Richmond Green Secondary School is a public secondary school in Richmond Hill, Ontario, Canada, located on Leslie Street just north of Elgin Mills Road. The school is managed by the York Region District School Board.

The school is a large, three-storey building attached to the Richmond Green Public Library, which also serves as a school library. It is named after the adjacent Richmond Green park.

== History ==
Despite officially opening as a high school in September 2005, the building was constructed a year earlier and initially functioned as a temporary elementary school due to construction setbacks at nearby Lincoln Alexander Public School. During the 2005–2006 school year, another York Region District School Board elementary school occupied the third floor while an extensive asbestos cleanup was underway at their building, restricting secondary school classes to the first and second floors.

== Inauguration ==
Richmond Green opened with approximately 331 Grade 9 and 10 students and over 30 staff. Most Grade 10 students transferred from nearby Bayview Secondary School and Richmond Hill High School. In its second year, enrolment grew to 500 students as Grade 11 courses were added. By the 2007–2008 school year, the population had reached 850 students with the addition of Grade 12. By May 2009, approximately 1,000 students were enrolled, driven by new housing developments in Richmond Hill and Markham. As of October 2025, enrolment stands at 1,056.

== Notable alumni ==
=== Sports ===
- Andrei Rogozine – gold medalist at the 2011 World Junior Figure Skating Championships
- Gabrielle Daleman – figure skating competitor at the 2014 Winter Olympics
- Denis Margalik – international figure skater and Argentine national champion

== See also ==
- Education in Ontario
- List of secondary schools in Ontario
