= Viva Purple =

Line on the Viva bus rapid transit system

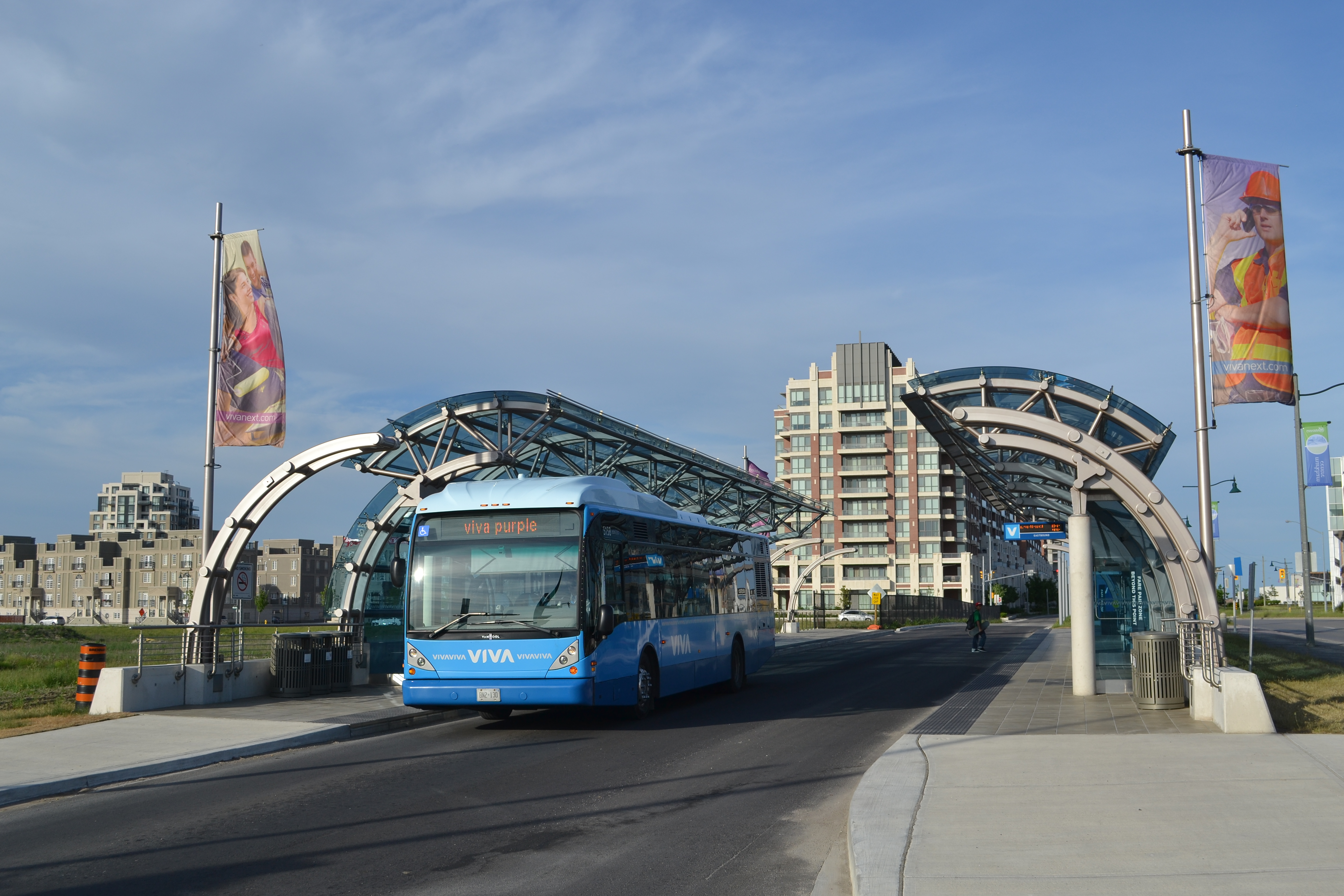

Overview
- System: YRT/Viva
- Operator: Tok Transit
- Vehicle: Van Hool A330; Nova Bus LF Series (articulated); New Flyer XD60
- Began service: September 4, 2005

Route
- Route type: Bus rapid transit
- Locale: York Region
- Communities served: Richmond Hill; Markham
- Start: Richmond Hill Centre Terminal
- Via: Highway 7
- End: Cornell Terminal
- Length: 18.2 kilometres (11.3 mi)
- Stops: 27

Service
- Frequency: 9 minutes (both branches combined) during rush hours 13 minutes during off peak hours (both branches combined) 18 minutes on other times and weekends (both branches combined)
- Ridership: 5,705 (2016)

Viva Purple is a line on the Viva bus rapid transit system in York Region, Ontario, Canada. The route primarily runs in an east–west direction along a dedicated right-of-way, dubbed the Highway 7 Rapidway, in Markham and Richmond Hill. It is operated by Tok Transit under contract from York Region.

== Route description ==
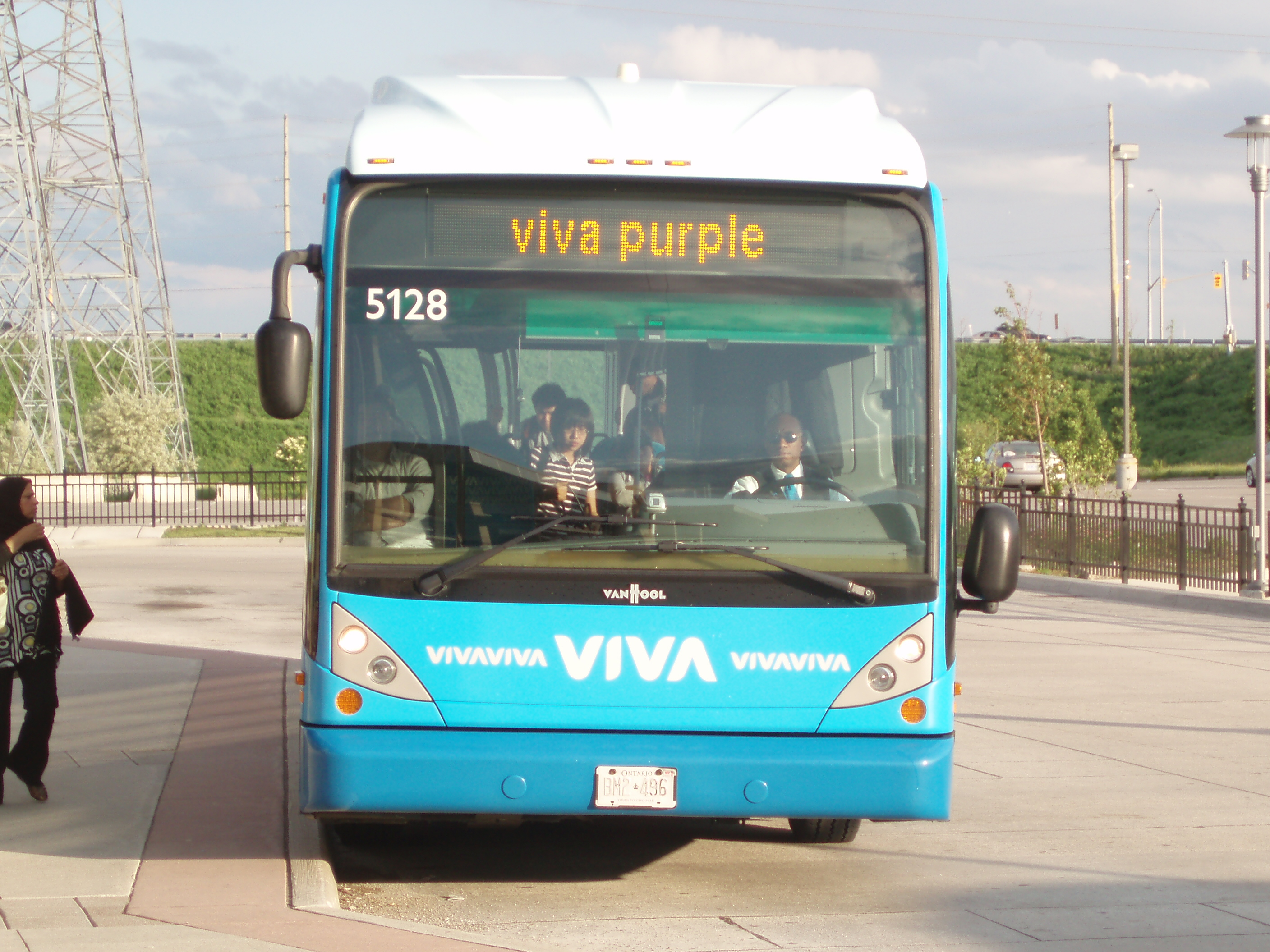
A Viva Purple bus stops at the Richmond Hill Centre Terminal.

Viva Purple operates along Highway 7 from Richmond Hill Centre Terminal (at Yonge Street) in the west, to Cornell Terminal (east of Ninth Line) in the east.

Viva Purple also operates an 'A' branch along Enterprise Boulevard (serving Downtown Markham) between Town Centre Boulevard and Kennedy Road. Alternating buses serve this branch and the Highway 7 base route except during weekday rush hour.

Viva Purple connects with all other Viva lines except Viva Yellow. Currently, there are 27 stops (dubbed Vivastations) along the route.

Viva Purple stops
Name	Opening date	Municipality	Major connections
Richmond Hill Centre	September 4, 2005	Richmond Hill	Langstaff GO
Bayview	September 4, 2005	Markham/ Richmond Hill	
Chalmers	August 19, 2013	Markham/ Richmond Hill	
Valleymede	September 4, 2005	Markham/ Richmond Hill	
West Beaver Creek	September 4, 2005	Markham/ Richmond Hill	
Leslie	September 4, 2005	Markham/ Richmond Hill	
East Beaver Creek	September 4, 2005	Markham/ Richmond Hill	
Allstate Parkway	September 4, 2005	Markham	
Woodbine	September 4, 2005	Markham	
Montgomery	September 4, 2005	Markham	
Town Centre	September 4, 2005	Markham	
Warden^{[B]}	December 17, 2017	Markham	
Village Parkway^{[B]}	December 17, 2017	Markham	
Sciberras^{[B]}	December 17, 2017	Markham	
Main Street Unionville^{[B]}	September 1, 2019	Markham	
Cedarland^{[A]}	December 28, 2014	Markham	
Warden/Enterprise^{[A]}	November 20, 2005	Markham	
Andre De Grasse^{[A]}	February 5, 2017	Markham	
University Boulevard^{[A]}	November 20, 2005	Markham	Unionville GO
Kennedy/Highway 7	October 16, 2005	Markham	
Bullock	October 16, 2005	Markham	
McCowan	October 16, 2005	Markham	
Galsworthy	September 5, 2010	Markham	
Main Street Markham	January 27, 2008	Markham	
Wootten Way	January 27, 2008	Markham	
Markham Stouffville Hospital^{[E]}	January 27, 2008	Markham	
Cornell Terminal	September 4, 2022	Markham	52 56

=== Notes ===
^{[A]} Stop served by 'A' branch (via Enterprise Blvd.) only

^{[B]} Stop served by base route (via Highway 7) only

^{[E]} Eastbound only

== Route history ==
Viva Purple has seen considerable changes since it began service on September 4, 2005:

It originally ran from York University in Toronto, via the City of Vaughan , to Town Centre Boulevard. It was extended east to McCowan Road on October 16, 2005. Rush hour service was extended west of York University to Martin Grove Road beginning November 20 of that year. On September 2, 2007, the peak service west of York University was discontinued as the overlapping service with Viva Orange turned out to be excessive. The route was extended east of McCowan Road to Markham Stouffville Hospital on January 27, 2008.

On December 17, 2017, the route was given a Toronto subway connection at York University when the namesake York University Station opened upon completion of the northward extension of the western branch of Line 1 Yonge–University. The branch along Highway 7 (bypassing the Downtown Markham routing via Enterprise Boulevard) was also established at this time.

On September 2, 2018, service to York University and the subway was discontinued when Viva Purple was cut back again to Richmond Hill Centre Terminal.

On September 5, 2021, the original route (along Enterprise Boulevard) was designated as the 'A' branch (Viva Purple 'A'), and the later branch (along Highway 7) was designated as the base route. On September 4, 2022, the eastern terminus was extended to the new Cornell Terminal.

== Rapidway ==
The Viva Purple line follows the aforementioned Highway 7 Rapidway dedicated right-of-way for most of its route. Eventually, the entire Highway 7 Corridor could be upgraded to light rail transit.
