= Cornell Terminal =

Bus station in Markham, Ontario

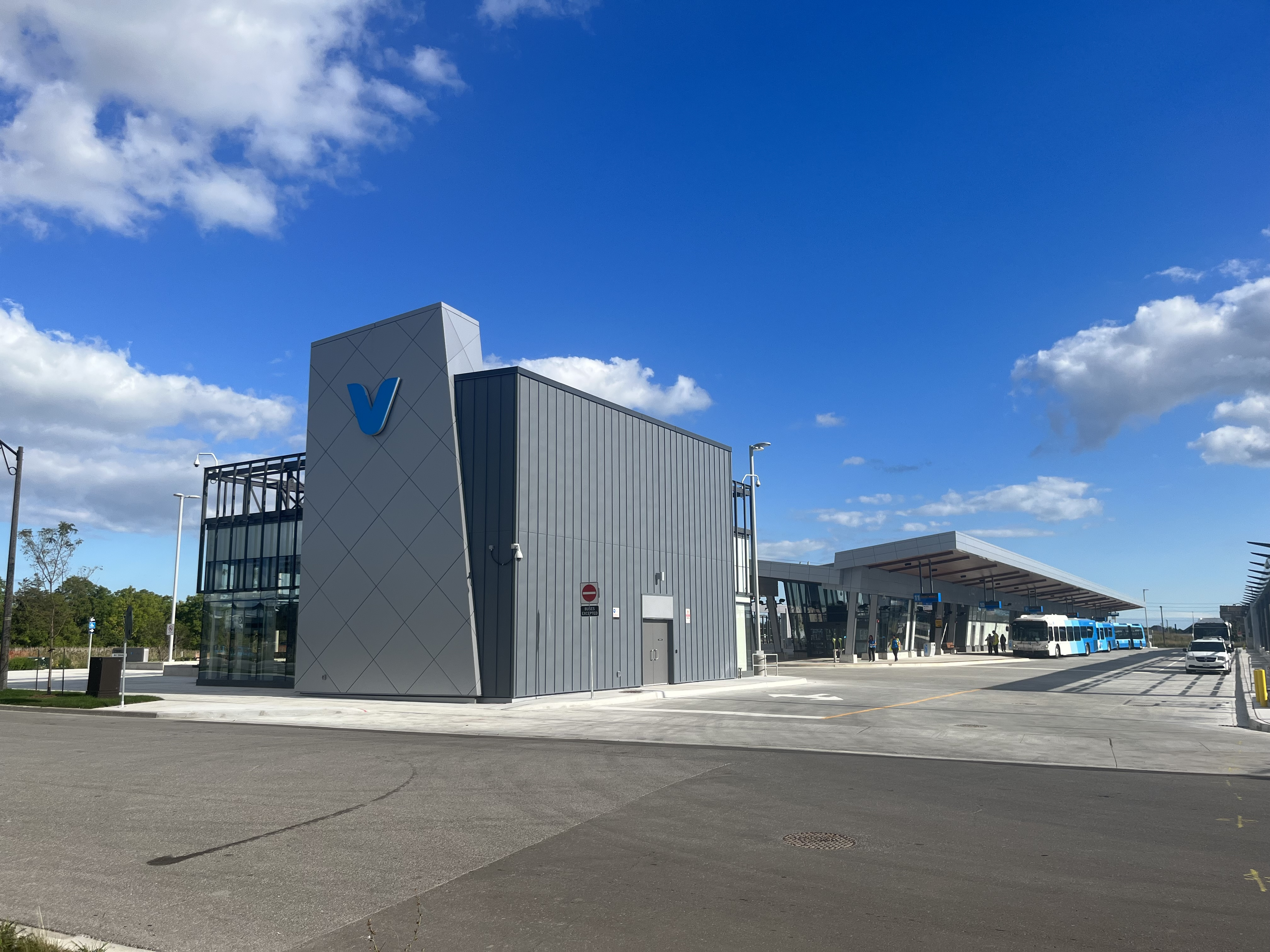

General information
- Location: 467 Rustle Woods Avenue, Markham, Ontario; Canada
- Coordinates: 43°52′51″N 79°13′54″W
- Owner: Regional Municipality of York
- Operator: York Region Transit; GO Transit; Durham Region Transit (planned)
- Bus routes: / YRT/Viva buses: 1 Highway 7; 2 Miliken; 9 9th Line; 14 14th Avenue; 16 16th Avenue; 18 Bur Oak; 25 Major Mackenzie; 522 Markham Community Bus; Viva Purple; GO buses: 52 Oshawa - Hwy 407 Bus Terminal; 56 Oshawa - Oakville; FlixBus intercity coaches
- Bus stands: 11

Construction
- Accessible: Yes

History
- Opened: September 4, 2022
Location
Location

Cornell Terminal is a York Region Transit bus terminus on a site immediately south of Markham Stouffville Hospital in Markham, Ontario, Canada. The station opened in September 2022 and includes a passenger pick-up and drop-off area, a public plaza, and future retail space. Restrooms are located in the terminal.

== Planning ==
The terminal was first scheduled to open in 2008 and although planning continued, construction was postponed.

A long-term proposal for a Metrolinx transitway terminal close to Highway 407 and future integration with a Havelock GO Train line, which would use the CPR Havelock Subdivision, will not result in the Cornell Terminal being moved since it will still be required for local bus services and Viva would serve both locations.

York Region acquired land in 2014 in the Cornell Centre district, just south of the hospital property and adjacent to a proposed extension of Rose Way east of 9th Line. This location will serve the hospital, community centre and local residents, while relieving Church Street of bus traffic and congestion at the hospital entrance. At that time the terminal was scheduled to open in mid 2016.

On June 18, 2018, the $16.7 million contract for the construction of the bus terminal was awarded to Orin Contractors Corporation and construction began on July 31.

== Bus service ==
When the new terminal opened on September 4, 2022, it became the eastern terminus of Viva Rapid Transit's Viva Purple route and a hub for local York Region Transit bus routes.

GO Transit bus routes 52 and 56 started servicing Cornell Terminal on October 1, 2022. Durham Region Transit services are planned to service the new terminal in the near future.

=== Platform assignments ===
All routes are YRT unless indicated otherwise.

- Platform 2: 18 Bur Oak
- Platform 3: 522 Markham Local, Mobility On-Request
- Platform 4: 16 16th Avenue
- Platform 5: 25 Major Mackenzie
- Platform 6: GO Transit 52 Oshawa - Hwy 407 Bus Terminal, GO Transit 56 Oshawa - Oakville
- Platform 8: Viva Purple
- Platform 9: 1 Highway 7 westbound
- Platform 10: 2 Milliken, 14 14th Avenue
- Platform 11: 1 Highway 7 eastbound, 9 Ninth Line

FlixBus service to Toronto Pearson Airport, Kingston, and Ottawa (Kanata) stops at the terminal.
