= Stephen Lewis Secondary School (Vaughan) =

Location
- 555 Autumn Hill Boulevard; Thornhill, Ontario, L4J 8X2; Canada; 43°50′11″N 79°28′34″W

Information
- School type: Public high school
- Founded: 2006; 20 years ago
- School board: York Region District School Board
- Superintendent: Steve Gardner
- Area trustee: Lotan Wider
- School number: 945508
- Principal: Todd Taylor
- Grades: 9–12
- Enrolment: 1,760 (31 October 2023)
- Capacity: 1,365
- Language: English
- Area: Thornhill, Ontario
- Colours: Royal Blue, Black, Silver, White
- Mascot: Shark
- Team name: Sharks
- Website: www.yrdsb.ca/schools/stephenlewis.ss/Pages/default.aspx
- Last updated: October 2024

Stephen Lewis Secondary School is a public semestered high school in Vaughan, Ontario, Canada administered by the York Region District School Board. Currently, the school enrols students in grades 9, 10, 11 and 12, all of which are from the "Vaughan Block 10" region. The school is named for Canadian statesman Stephen Lewis.

As of the 2023–2024 school year, Stephen Lewis Secondary School is the most populated high school in the York Region District School Board, based on official school-by-school enrolment reports.

The school opened for service on September 5, 2006, and was officially designated on May 8, 2007.

== Notable alumni ==
- Denis Shapovalov, tennis player, winner of 2016 Wimbledon Boys' Singles Championship and 2015 US Open Boys' Doubles Championship.

== See also ==
- Education in Ontario
- List of secondary schools in Ontario
