= Markham Stouffville Hospital =

- Oak Valley Health
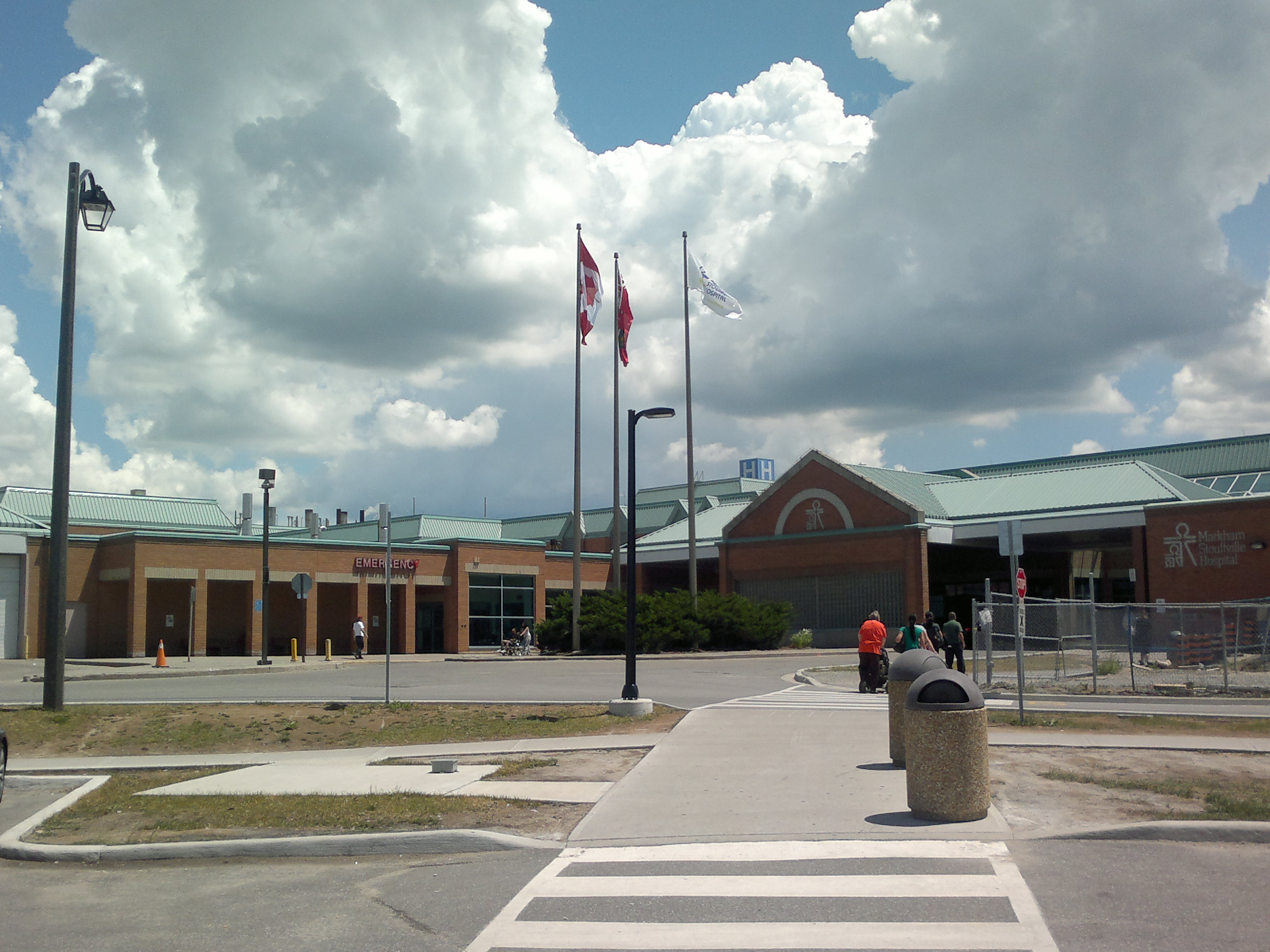

- Location in Ontario

Geography
- Location: Markham, York Region, Ontario, Canada
- Coordinates: 43.884444°N 79.232778°W

Organization
- Care system: Public Medicare (Canada) (OHIP)
- Type: Community
- Affiliated university: University of Toronto

Services
- Emergency department: II; III Trauma centre
- Beds: 309

Helipads
- Helipad: TC LID: CPH7

History
- Founded: 1990

Links
- Website: http://www.msh.on.ca/
- Lists: Hospitals in Canada

Markham Stouffville Hospital is an acute care community hospital with two sites: the Markham site, with diagnostic and emergency services, and clinical programs in childbirth, children's health, surgery, medicine, cancer care and mental health; and the Uxbridge site, a 20-bed hospital offering some inpatient and emergency services. In the 2019-2020 fiscal year, there were almost 20,000 inpatient stays with an average length of stay of 4.6 days, and 106,000 emergency department visits.

== History ==
Opened in 1990, it was created to relieve stress on York Central Hospital in Richmond Hill and hospitals in the north part of Toronto. MSH is the only hospital in Markham and one of three in south York Region. It was one of a few Greater Toronto Area hospitals dealing with severe acute respiratory syndrome (SARS) patients.

In 2004, Uxbridge Cottage Hospital became a partner site with MSH.

In 2010, MSH became an affiliated and community teaching hospital linked with the University of Toronto's Faculty of Medicine.

The original complex was built by Mathers & Haldenby Architects and the current expansion by Bregman+Hamann and Perkins+Will.

== Services ==
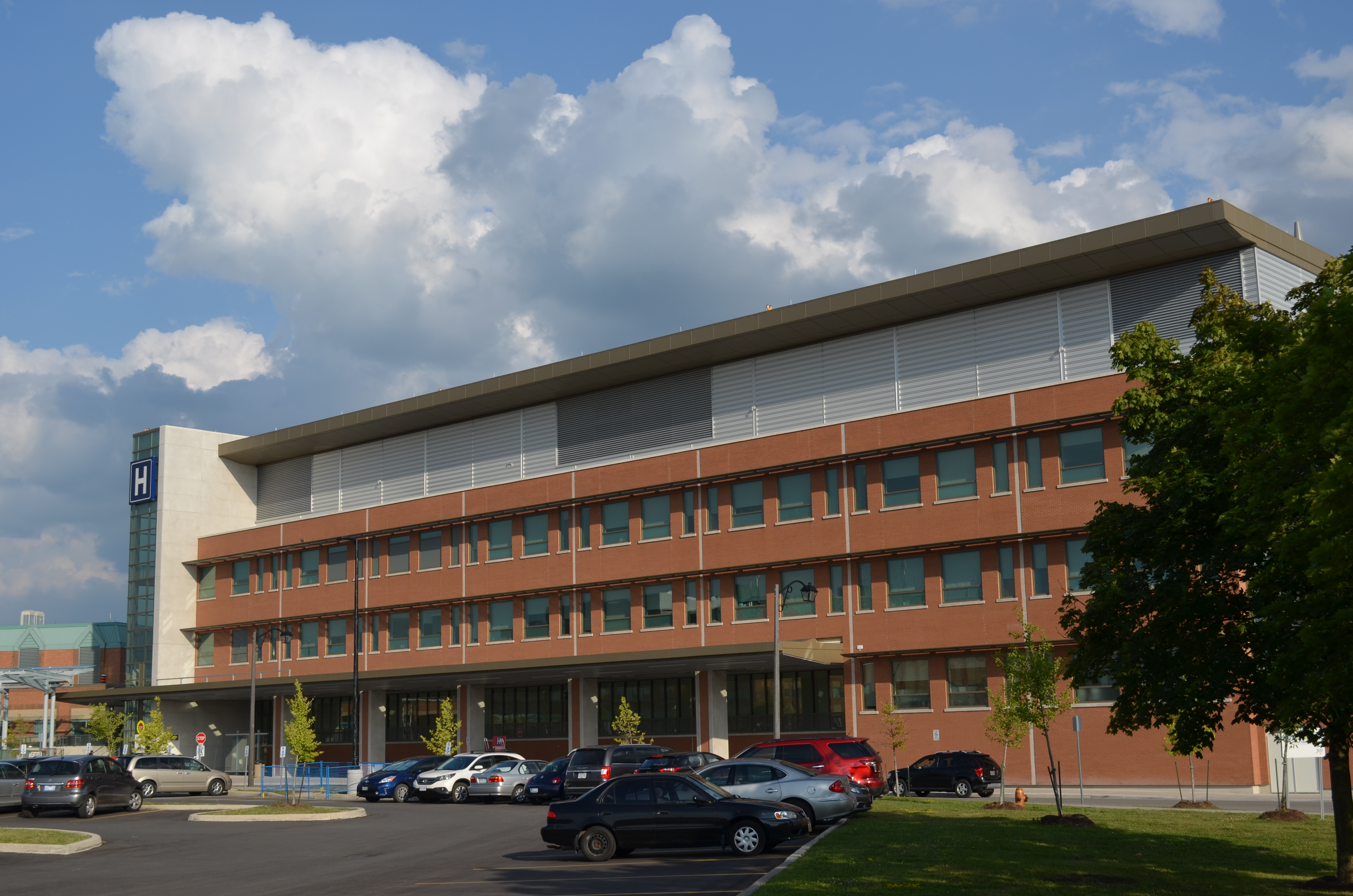
Markham Stouffville Hospital building

MSH is a popular hospital for ambulance re-directs from east-end Toronto hospitals with bed shortages.

Services provided at MSH:

- Acute Care
- Ambulatory Care
- Cardiorespiratory and Electrodiagnostics
- Cardiology
- Emergency
- Maternal/Child System
- Mental Health/Inpatient Programs
- Mental Health/Outpatient Programs
- Nuclear Medicine
- Oncology
- Rehab, Palliative & Complex Care
- Surgery
- Ultrasound
- Physicians / Specialist Search
- Department of Family Practice Clinics
- Department of Laboratory Service Clinics
- Diagnostic System-PACS Clinics
- Telemedicine
- Ronald McDonald Family Room - opened 2013

== Heliport ==
The hospital's helipad designation is (TC LID: CPH7). An original heliport was located at the east end of the hospital to facilitate medical airlifts to and from the hospital. Transfer of patients requires a journey of approximately 150 ft (46 m) from the pad to the near entrance at the rear. Upon completion of the rebuilding of the hospital in 2014, the helipad is now on the roof of the new emergency wing and allows the transfer of patients directly into the hospital building. The new pad is an elevated octagon shaped pad which connects the roof of the hospital by a steel frame with a ramp to the entrance to the hospital. The relocation provides a safer landing area given that the old pad was next to public access roads around the rear of the hospital. The old pad site was removed (along with a Windsock nearby) during the re-development of the new Cornell Community Centre & Library and used as a parking/storage space by construction crews.

== Bus terminal ==
Markham Stouffville Hospital Terminal
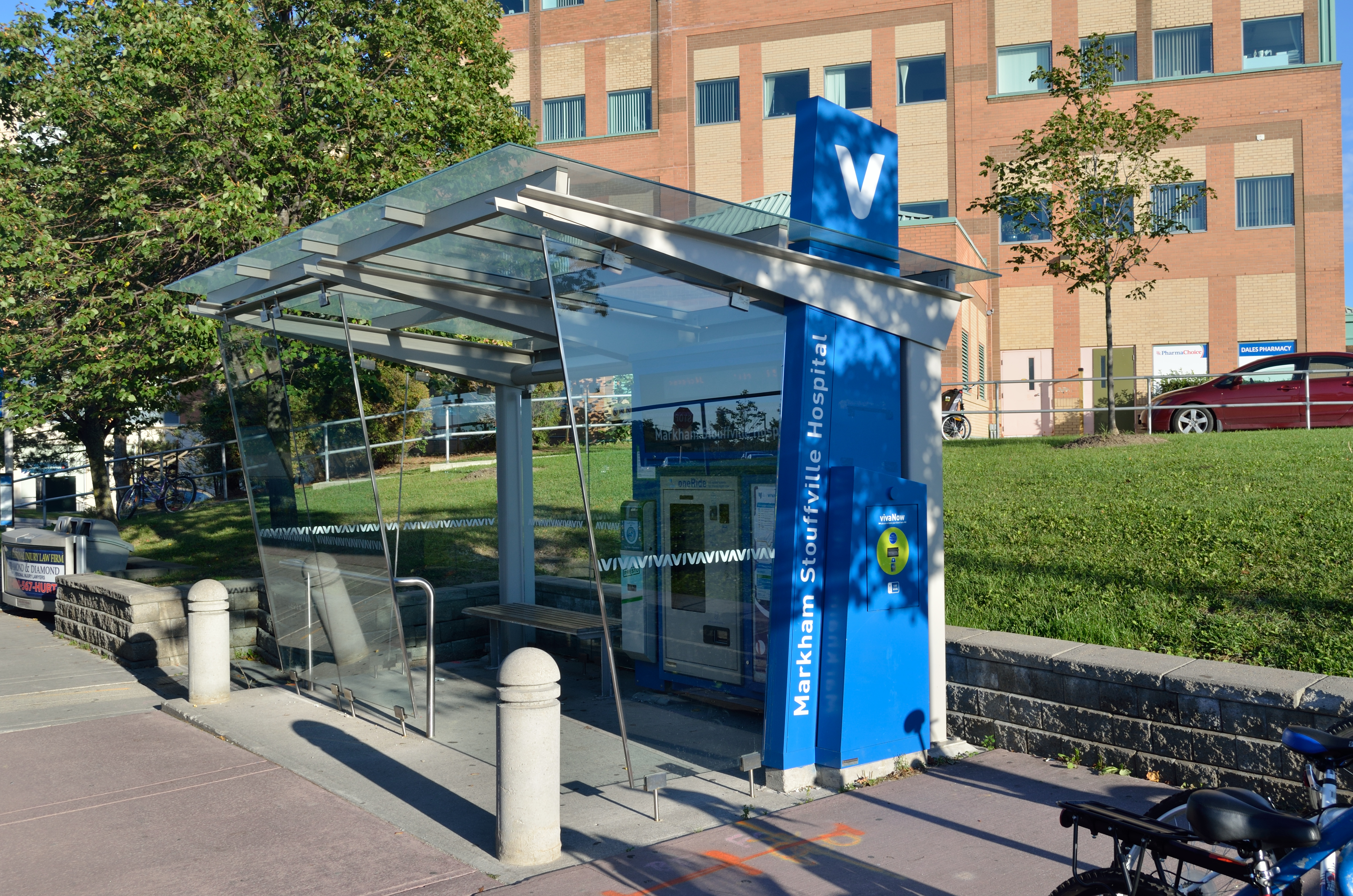
- Markham Stouffville Hospital Viva station

General information
- Bus operators: York Region Transit; Viva Rapid Transit

Construction
- Structure type: Curbside stops
- Accessible: Yes

History
- Opened: 1990
Location

Markham Stouffville Hospital Terminal is a hub that connects to several YRT and Viva bus routes, and is the easternmost transit terminal in York Region. It was partly replaced by Cornell Terminal upon its opening in 2022.

=== Routes ===
Markham Stouffville Hospital connects to the following bus routes:

- Viva Purple
- YRT 1 Highway 7
- YRT 9 9th Line
- YRT 16 16th Avenue
- YRT 303 Bur Oak Express
- YRT 522 Markham Community Bus
