= Newmarket Bus Terminal =

Bus terminal in Newmarket, Ontario, Canada

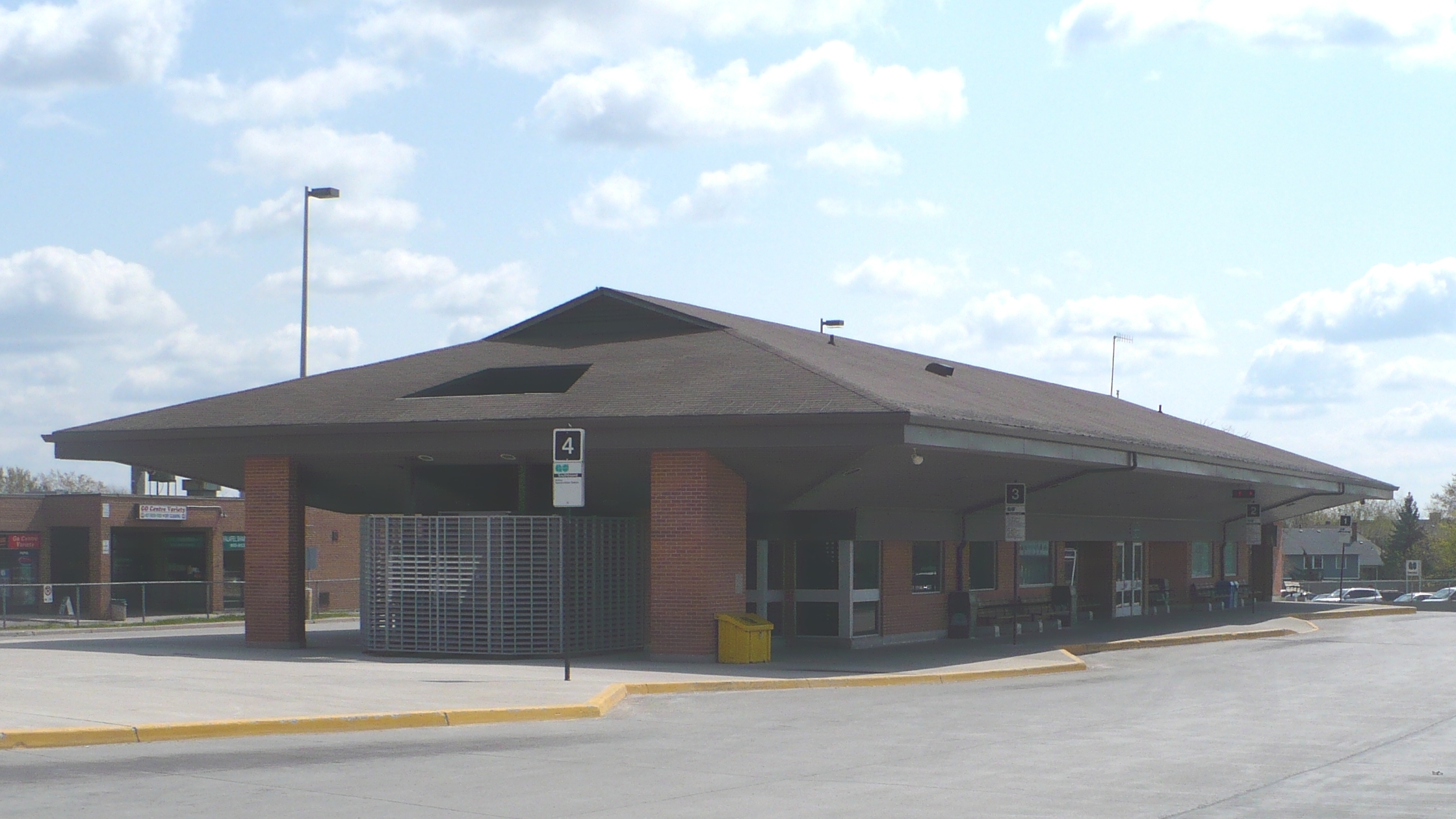

General information
- Location: 320 Eagle Street West; Newmarket, Ontario; Canada
- Coordinates: 44°03′10″N 79°29′11.4″W
- Owner: York Region Transit
- Platforms: 11
- Bus operators: / York Region Transit / Viva

Construction
- Structure type: Waiting room and public washrooms
- Parking: 447 spaces
- Cycle facilities: Yes
- Accessible: Yes

Other information
- Fare zone: 64

History
- Opened: 8 September 1970
Location

Newmarket Terminal is a bus terminal in Newmarket, Ontario, Canada operated by York Region Transit (YRT). It is located at 320 Eagle Street West at the intersection of Eagle Street West and Davis Drive. The facility has 447 parking spaces. The Newmarket GO Train Station is located at Davis Drive about two kilometres to the east.

The Newmarket Terminal includes a convenience store in its interior facility providing various amenities for transit riders.

== History ==
In 1969, planning for commuter services resulted in the establishment of a bus terminal in Newmarket in 1970, from which commuters would be taken to the Richmond Hill GO Station to commute to Toronto. It was one of four terminals in the "GO North" commuter services expansion of GO Transit, the other three being located in Barrie, Aurora, and Richmond Hill. In May 1970, the government of Ontario announced that the terminal would provide bus service only, instead of the commuter rail service originally planned for "GO North" service.

It was originally built by GO Transit as the northern terminal for its "B" service on Yonge Street, and as the southern terminal of its services to Barrie. On 22 April 1970, GO Transit announced that the intersection of Yonge Street and Davis Drive would be the site of the terminal. That site would use the original auto dealership as its headquarters, and GO Transit began operations at the site on 8 September 1970.

The terminal was moved to its present location in the 1980s. The building and grounds were upgraded in 2005 and 2006.

The first bus service picked up commuters at various stops in Newmarket before departing southbound from the terminal, and made stops in Aurora, Oak Ridges, Richmond Hill. In Toronto, passengers could disembark at the Eglinton TTC subway station, the Toronto Coach Terminal, or Union Station.

In March 1971, GO Transit began operating a "Shopper's Special" bus on weekdays and Saturdays, leaving the terminal in the morning and making stops in Aurora, King City, Maple, and by passenger request at other locations, with two final stops at the Toronto Coach Terminal and Union Station. For the afternoon return trip, passengers were required to board at the Toronto Coach Terminal or Union Station.

On November 20, 2005, Viva Blue was added to this terminal as part of the northern extension of the line during Viva Phase 3 and the north terminus. On November 29, 2015, Viva Yellow was implemented making this terminal the west terminus of the line.

YRT took ownership of the terminal from Metrolinx on February 1, 2020.

== Bus service ==
=== Platform assignments ===
All routes are YRT and Viva.

- Platform 1: 50 Queensway
- Platform 2: 98 Yonge, 98/99 Yonge
- Platform 3: 44 Bristol
- Platform 4: 56 Gorham-Eagle
- Platform 5: 55 Davis
- Platform 6: 52 Holland Landing
- Platform 7: 57 Mulock
- Platform 8: Mobility On-Request
- Platform 9: Viva Blue
- Platform 10: Viva Yellow
- Platform 11: 96 Keele-Yonge
