= TOK Coachlines =

Canadian coach operator

TOK Coachlines formerly Can-ar Coach Service
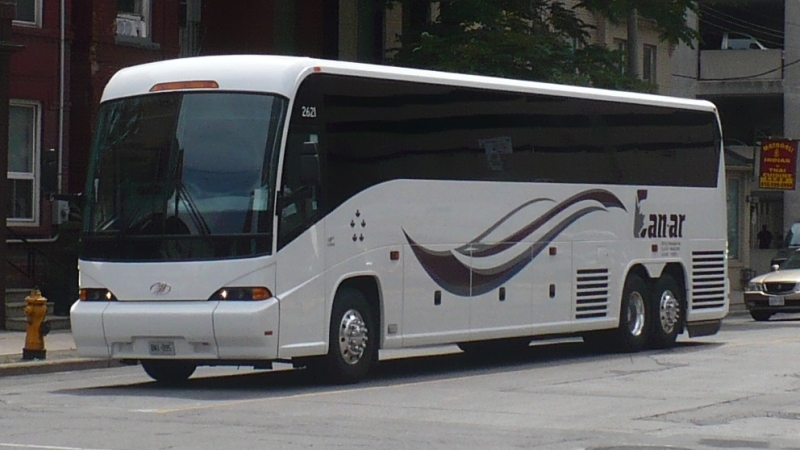
- Parent: Tokmakjian Inc.
- Founded: 1983 (renamed from Travelways Incorporated c. 1976)
- Headquarters: 221 Caldari Road, Vaughan, Ontario
- Locale: Greater Toronto Area
- Service area: Southern Ontario
- Service type: charted coach operator, transit bus contractor
- Fleet: 12 coaches
- Operator: TOK Group
- Website: TOK Coachlines

TOK Coachlines (formerly Can-ar Coach Service) is a chartered coach operator in the Greater Toronto Area, It is a division of Tokmakjian Inc., a privately held Canadian corporation operating as TOK Group based in Vaughan, Ontario. A related division of TOK Group is TOK Transit which operates public transit services under contract to municipalities.

== History ==
Can-ar Coach was established in 1983 when Travelways Incorporated, a Thornhill-based bus operator founded in 1976, was sold by Larry Needler (co-owner with several other partners).

Both TOK Coachlines and TOK Transit originally operated as Can-ar Coach Service.

== Operations ==
TOK Transit operates public transit bus service under contract for York Region Transit, and for Fort Erie Transit.

TOK's now-discontinued intercity services included a route from Southampton via Kincardine to Pearson Airport and Vaughan Metropolitan Centre station (ended 2026) and a route from Haliburton and Lindsay to Toronto (ended 2024.)

== See also ==
- Bus companies in Ontario
