= Richmond Hill Centre Terminal =

Bus terminal in Richmond Hill, Ontario

Richmond Hill Centre
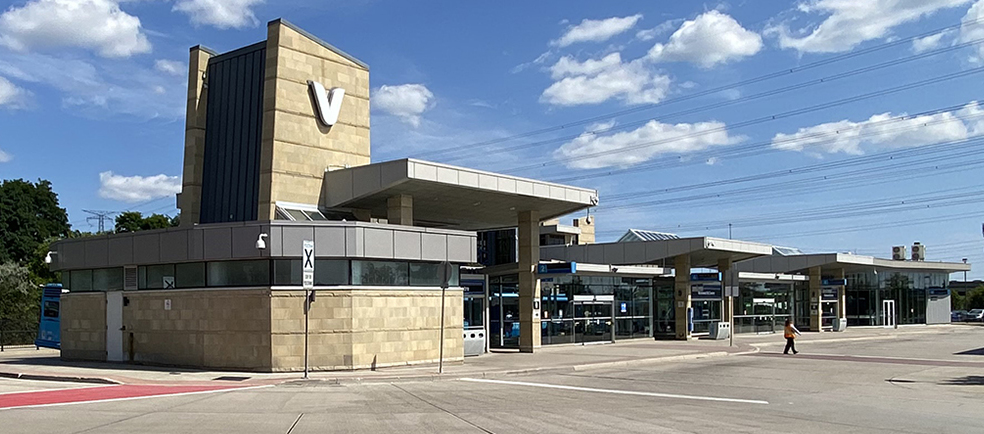

General information
- Location: 8675 Yonge Street, Richmond Hill, Ontario; Canada
- Coordinates: 43°50′24″N 79°25′32″W
- Owner: York Region Transit
- Platforms: 11
- Bus operators: York Region Transit (includes Viva); GO Transit
- Connections: at Langstaff GO Station; FlixBus

Construction
- Parking: 200 parking spaces
- Cycle facilities: 3 racks
- Accessible: Yes

Other information
- Station code: GO Transit: 00350
- Fare zone: 1

History
- Opened: September 4, 2005; 21 years ago
Location

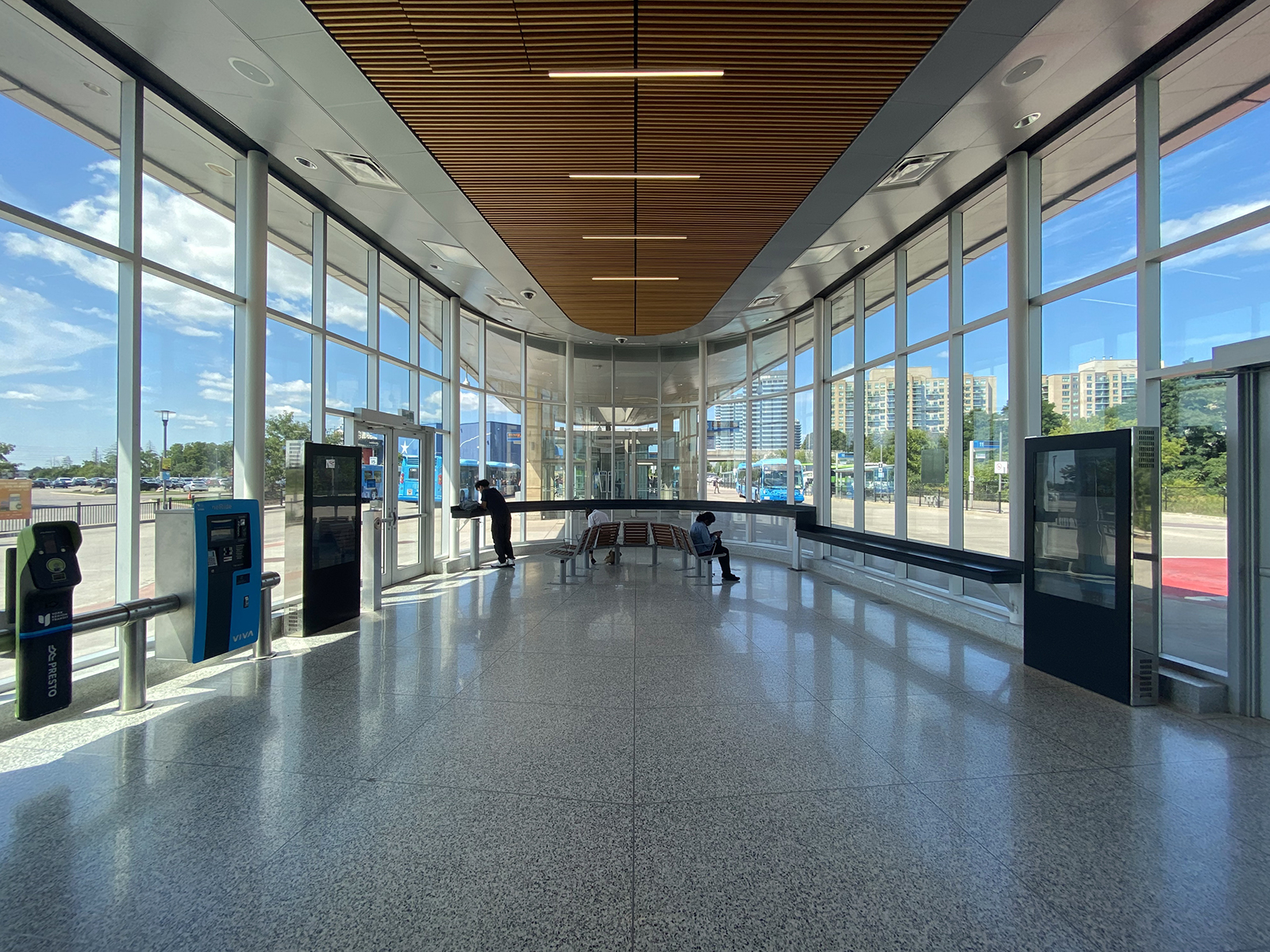
Indoor area of the terminal

Richmond Hill Centre Terminal is a York Region Transit, Viva, and GO Transit bus terminal in Richmond Hill, Ontario. Despite its name, the terminal is not located in downtown Richmond Hill, but is situated 4 km (2.5 miles) to the south at the city's southern limits, bordering Vaughan and Markham, near the connecting road that links the grade-separated Yonge Street and Highway 7 intersection. It opened on September 4, 2005. It is immediately west of the Langstaff GO train station, but is separated by the tracks. A pedestrian bridge over the tracks was opened in March 2008 to connect the bus terminal and the train station. Public washrooms were added to the terminal in December 2012.

== Bus service ==
=== Platform assignments ===
All routes are YRT unless indicated otherwise.

- Platform 1: Viva Purple
- Platform 2: Viva Orange
- Platform 3: Viva Blue southbound
- Platform 4: Viva Blue northbound
- Platform 5: 1 Highway 7, 360 Vaughan Mills/Wonderland, Mobility Plus
- Platform 6: 83 Trench, 87 Autumn Hill
- Platform 7: 91B Bayview, 99 Yonge southbound
- Platform 8: 86 Newkirk-Red Maple, 99 Yonge northbound
- Platform 9: GO Transit westbound 41: 407 West, 52-54-56: 407 East
- Platform 10: GO Transit 40: Hamilton/Richmond Hill Pearson Express to Hamilton GO Centre via Toronto Pearson International Airport and Square One Bus Terminal, 56 eastbound: 407 East
- Platform 11: GO Transit eastbound 41, 41B: 407 West, 52-54: 407 East

As of April 26, 2008, GO Transit commenced Airport Express GO Bus service directly from this terminal to Toronto Pearson International Airport, providing one arrival and departure in each of 24 hours a day, 7 days a week. Travel time is approximately 20 minutes. This service was subsequently extended to Hamilton via Mississauga. In 2011, GO Transit moved all bus services (except route 61 Richmond Hill) from Langstaff GO Station to Richmond Hill Centre Terminal. Passengers using the GO Transit bus to Pearson Airport should check with York Region Transit before parking overnight in the parking lot. In September 2020, GO Transit extended route 45B to Richmond Hill Centre, which provides increased weekday frequencies to Unionville GO Station, Square One Bus Terminal while bypassing Toronto Pearson International Airport, and new access to Streetsville GO Station in Mississauga from Richmond Hill.

FlixBus service to Toronto Pearson Airport, Kingston, and Ottawa stops at the terminal.

There are no sidewalks for pedestrian access to this terminal.

== Subway extension proposal ==
Under the MoveOntario 2020 plan, the Yonge subway line will extend north from Finch station to Richmond Hill Centre Terminal. In a 2012 concept design report, the subway station was located in a north-south orientation underneath the cinema and High Tech Road, with three options for integration with a bus terminal and Langstaff GO Station. In March 2021, after budget considerations, Metrolinx announced that the two northern-most stations, one at Highway 7 and another 400 metres (1,300 ft) further north at High Tech Road, would be built on the surface. From north of Royal Orchard Boulevard, the extension would veer east away from Yonge Street to surface and then turn north along the GO railway corridor.
