= York University GO Station =

Former railway station in Ontario, Canada

York University
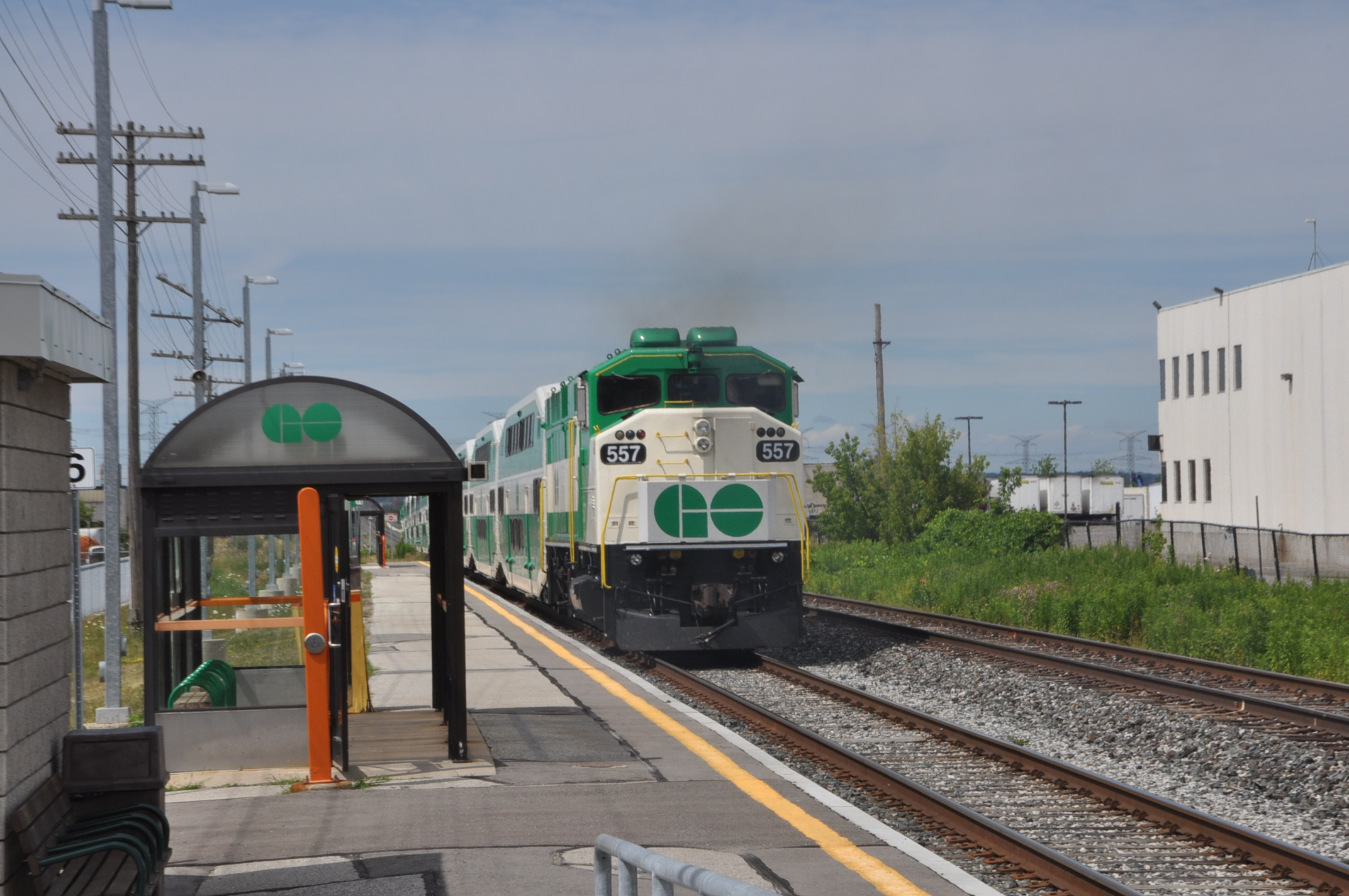
- A GO train at York University in 2012

General information
- Location: 595-A Canarctic Drive; Toronto, Ontario; Canada
- Coordinates: 43°46′43.8″N 79°29′00.4″W
- Owner: Metrolinx
- Platforms: 1 side platform
- Tracks: 2
- Connections: York University shuttle

Construction
- Structure type: Shelter on platform
- Parking: None
- Cycle facilities: Yes
- Accessible: Yes

Other information
- Station code: GO Transit: YO
- Fare zone: 19

History
- Opened: September 6, 2002
- Closed: March 17, 2020 (last train); July 19, 2021 (announcement)

Key dates
- Demolished: April 2022

Services
Preceding station	GO Transit	Following station
Rutherford towards Allandale Waterfront	Barrie	Downsview Park towards Union
Location

York University GO Station was a train station on GO Transit's Barrie line in the North York district of Toronto, Ontario, Canada. Despite its name, the station was located 1.6 km (1 mi) away from York University's Keele Campus in a predominantly industrial area. To facilitate access to the campus, the university operated a private shuttle bus service.

The station only operated on weekdays, serving southbound trains during the morning peak period and northbound trains during the afternoon peak period. Its replacement, Downsview Park station, now offers a connection from midday, evening, weekend, and holiday GO trains to the university at all times via a two-stop trip on the Toronto Transit Commission's Line 1 subway. The station closed in 2021.

== History ==
York University GO Station officially opened on September 6, 2002, the result of an $850,000 provincial investment. It featured a single platform on the west track, equipped with passenger shelters and a ticket vending machine.

Downsview Park station was initially conceived as a full replacement for York University GO Station, given its direct link to the Keele Campus via the Toronto–York Spadina Subway Extension. However, opposition from university members and a local councillor prevented York University GO Station's immediate closure. Instead, a compromise kept the station operational, albeit in a limited capacity, when Downsview Park station began serving GO trains on December 30, 2017. With most trains bypassing the station, daily ridership plummeted to a mere 105 passengers by 2018. The majority of commuters instead opted for the new York University and Pioneer Village subway stations to access the campus.

On March 18, 2020, York University GO Station was temporarily closed in response to the COVID-19 pandemic and the subsequent shutdown of most campus operations. By October of that year, the station had been removed from schedules and the GO Transit website, and by February 2021, it no longer appeared on GO Transit's system map. On July 19, 2021, Metrolinx announced the permanent closure of York University GO Station, with demolition scheduled to make way for expanded Barrie line tracks. The station was demolished in April 2022.

== Services ==
From January 2018 to March 2020, weekday service consisted of eight southbound morning trains to Union Station, seven northbound afternoon trains to Allandale Waterfront GO Station, and one northbound evening train to Bradford GO Station. With the opening of Downsview Park station in December 2017, weekend service to this station was discontinued.

The station had no public transit links. Its only bus connection was York University's private shuttle, which was only available to students and staff. These shuttles, which ranged from full-sized transit buses to smaller vans, ferried passengers between the Keele Campus, off-campus housing, and the GO platform.
