= Innisfil GO Station =

Proposed passenger rail station in Ontario

Innisfil

General information
- Location: Sixth Line; Innisfil, Ontario
- Coordinates: 44°17′22″N 79°33′32″W
- Owner: Metrolinx
- Platforms: Side platforms
- Tracks: 2 + 1 bypass

Construction
- Accessible: Yes

Services
Preceding station	GO Transit	Following station
Barrie South towards Allandale Waterfront	Barrie Planned expansion	Bradford towards Union
Location

Innisfil GO Station is a planned GO Transit train station to be built by Metrolinx on the Barrie line in Innisfil, Ontario as part of its GO Expansion program. A parking lot, a bus loop and a park and ride area will be provided. Its construction will be financed and constructed by developers in the area, who propose a large transit-oriented development known as The Orbit.

== History ==
A station in Innisfil had first been proposed in a 2010 GO Transit system electrification study. In 2015, Metrolinx proposed it again as part of a larger list of potential future station sites, and it was ultimately included in the list of stations to be built within the RER program. In 2016, there were 2 potential sites for a station in Innisfil: 5th Line and 6th Line. The location of the station had been controversial among residents and developers in the area. Innisfil Town Council supported the 6th line location and it was ultimately chosen by Metrolinx.

In 2016, Metrolinx rated the station location highly for affordability of construction but low for ridership, which is expected to be 2,800 per day in 2031. In 2020, the cost to build the station was estimated to be CA$29 million. The town of Innisfil wanted construction to begin in 2022 and the station open by September 2022, but construction was later delayed to 2023. Construction was delayed further and in 2023, it was unclear when construction would start. In 2025, developers in the area submitted a 90 percent design of the station to Metrolinx and Innisfil was confident construction would star the following year, though Metrolinx continued to not provide timing as its construction is dependent on private financing.

=== The Orbit ===
In 2019, Cortel Group proposed a long-term transit-oriented development, dubbed The Orbit, around the station with the goal of 30,000 people living in the area in the near future. Initially, the long-term goal after the development's completion was for 150,000 residents, though this has since been reduced to 90,000 residents and 20,000 jobs. That November, Innisfil Town Council approved The Orbit as Cortel committed to funding the station. In 2020, the provincial government issued a minister's zoning order (MZO) to expedite The Orbit.
