= King City GO Station =

Train station in King City, Ontario

King City
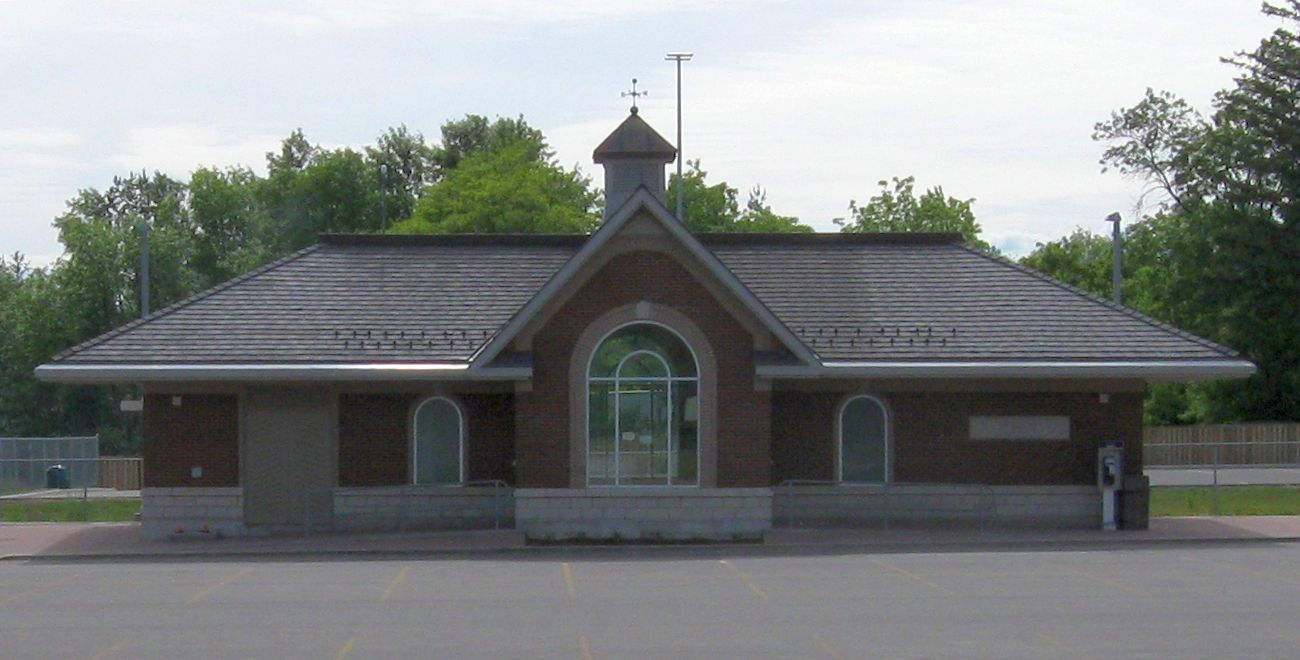
- Station building in 2009

General information
- Location: 7 Station Road; King City, Ontario; Canada
- Coordinates: 43°55′12″N 79°31′37.2″W
- Owner: Metrolinx
- Platforms: 1 side platform, 250m long
- Tracks: 1
- Bus routes: 65
- Connections: York Region Transit; Ontario Northland Bus

Construction
- Structure type: Brick station building
- Parking: 555 spaces
- Cycle facilities: Yes
- Accessible: Yes

Other information
- Station code: GO Transit: KC
- Fare zone: 62

History
- Opened: September 7, 1982; 44 years ago

Services
| Preceding station | GO Transit | Following station |
|---|---|---|
| Aurora towards Allandale Waterfront | Barrie | Maple towards Union |
Former services
| Preceding station | Canadian National Railway | Following station |
|---|---|---|
| Aurora toward North Bay | North Bay – Toronto | Maple toward Toronto |
Location

King City GO Station is a train and bus station in the GO Transit network located in King City, Ontario in Canada. It also serves the nearby communities of Nobleton, Oak Ridges, the northern parts of Maple (in Vaughan), and other communities in King Township. It is a stop on the Barrie line train service.

== History ==
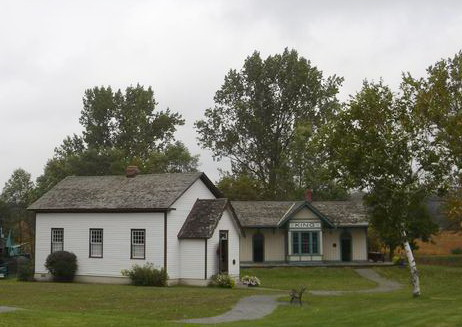
Original King Station in background

The original King Station was built in 1852 at a location less than a kilometre north of the current station, adjacent to the community's inn. The station building was moved to Boyd Conservation Area in Vaughan on 6 March 1968, then to the grounds of the King Township Museum in 1989, and was designated a heritage site in 1990.

King Station, circa 1852. The oldest surviving railway station in Canada. Built by Northern Railway on lands donated by Isaac Dennis near his hotel in Springhill (now King City). Designed by F.W. Cumberland, architect, King Station witnessed Ontario's first steam locomotive "Toronto" on its inaugural run from Toronto to Machell's Corners (Aurora), May 16, 1853.

— Heritage plaque text

=== GO Transit ===
The GO Station opened on 7 September 1982, with service extending south to Toronto and north to Bradford.

In 2002, with infrastructure funding from the provincial government, GO Transit expanded the station's parking lot capacity from 111 spaces to 255.

During 2004, the platform was extended in order to accommodate longer trainsets, thus removing any boarding restrictions that GO Transit had with this station prior to opening the extended rail platform. In addition, the extension also eliminated the problem of GO trains blocking a railroad crossing on Station Road while passengers boarded and disembarked.

Construction of a covered station building was completed in the summer of 2005, and a second parking lot on the west side of the tracks was opened in February 2006.

In February 2021, an article stated that Metrolinx had expropriated title to the adjacent property at the corner of Station Road and Keele Street as part of the GO Transit Regional Express Rail expansion program. Metrolinx offered $1 for the land, stating that the cost to clean up the property contaminated by the automobile repair shop renting it would exceed the property's assessed value of $2.1 million.

In 2022, construction will start to add a second track and platform for increased two-way all-day service, construct a new pedestrian bridge and increase parking capacity.

== Services ==
As of January 2018, train service operates approximately every 15-30 minutes in the morning peak period, every 30 minutes in the afternoon peak period and every hour at other times. Outside of peak periods, most trains terminate at Aurora with connecting buses for stations further north.

On weekends and holidays, service operates approximately every hour to and from Union Station, with most trains terminating at Aurora station. Three daily trains in each direction cover the full route from Barrie to Toronto, while the remainder have bus connections at Aurora station for stations further north.

Connecting York Region Transit and GO buses serve the station from a bus stop on Keele Street at Station Road. Ontario Northland provides intercity service to North Bay and Sudbury.

== Ridership ==
Daily train boarding at the station has increased from 199 in 2005 to a peak of 680 in 2008. In 2012, there were 655 daily boardings, or approximately 170,000 riders annually. GO Transit bus route 63, which travels between the King City GO Station and Union Station Bus Terminal via Maple and Rutherford GO stations, served a daily average of 450 riders at this station in 2012.
