= Barrie line =

Commuter rail service in Ontario, Canada

Barrie
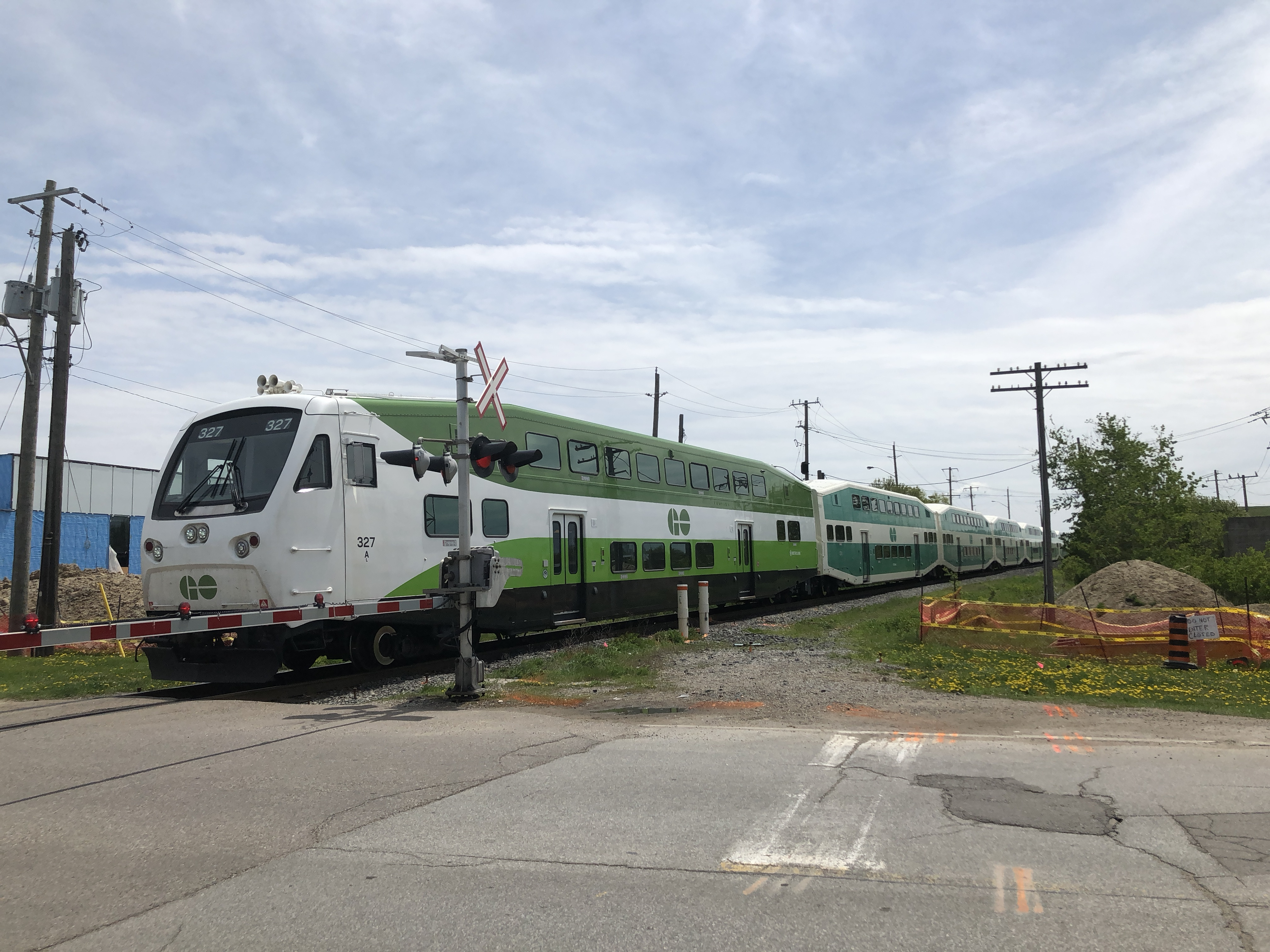
- Barrie line train rolling through Downsview Park, May 2018

Overview
- Service type: Commuter rail
- System: GO Transit rail services
- Locale: Greater Toronto Area; Simcoe County
- First service: September 7, 1982; 44 years ago
- Current operator: Alstom
- Daily ridership: 9,100 (2019)

Route
- Termini: Union; Allandale Waterfront
- Stops: 11 (plus 2 under construction)
- Distance travelled: 101.4 km (63.0 mi)

Technical
- Rolling stock: Bombardier BiLevel Coach
- Track gauge: 1,435 mm (4 ft 8 1/2 in) standard gauge
- Operating speed: 80 mph (130 km/h)
- Average length: 6–12 coaches
- Track owner: Metrolinx

The Barrie line is one of the seven commuter rail lines of the GO Transit system in the Greater Toronto Area, Ontario, Canada. It extends from Union Station in Toronto in a generally northward direction to Barrie, and includes ten stations along its 101.4 kilometres (63.0 mi) route. From 1982 to 1990 and again from 1993 to 2007, it was known as the Bradford line, named after its former terminus at Bradford GO Station until the opening of Barrie South GO Station.

The Barrie line runs on the former Northern Railway of Canada route. This is the oldest operating railway line in Ontario, with passenger service beginning in 1853.

== History ==
In 1852, construction began on the Ontario, Simcoe and Huron Railway, which would run from Toronto to Collingwood. The line opened on May 16, 1853, when passenger train service began operating between Toronto and Aurora (then Machell's Corners). On October 11, 1853, service was extended to Allandale, then opposite Barrie on the south shore of Kempenfelt Bay.

In 1888, the Grand Trunk Railway took over operation of the line. In 1923, the bankrupt Grand Trunk Railway was merged into the Canadian National Railway (CNR) network.

=== Commuter service planning ===
In 1968, MPP William Hodgson introduced a private member's bill to move that the government of Ontario establish GO Transit services north of Metro Toronto. That year, a community group known as the GO North Committee distributed "GO North" stickers for motorists to adhere to their automobile's windshield to advocate for GO Transit commuter rail service north of Toronto.

Planning for commuter services resulted in the establishment of the Newmarket Bus Terminal by 1970, from which commuters would be taken to the Richmond Hill GO Station to commute to Toronto.

John Crawford Medcof, operating a company named Railroad Boosters, rented a train for one-day service between Barrie and Toronto on 16 October 1969, earning a profit. He gave the proceeds to the government of Ontario to support a north GO train service promised by John Robarts in late 1969, but asked for the government to return the money when the provincial government announced it would not establish a Richmond Hill line service in 1970. He applied for a grant of CA$97,200 from the federal government to operate a commuter train for twelve weeks, with one train leaving Barrie in the morning for Toronto, and a return trip at night. The grant was approved per the government's local initiatives program in December 1971. The train was operated by Canadian National Railways, and charged the same fares as those for the GO Transit bus service. Another trial commuter service from Barrie to Toronto was operated in late 1972, carrying 13,483 passengers.

In 1973, the Canadian Transport Commission held a public hearing at Georgian College during which its three-member committee heard presentations from Medcof and councillors from all "municipalities between Toronto and Barrie". All presentations favoured the creation of commuter train service between the two cities, including that of York—Simcoe MP Sinclair Stevens.

On April 1, 1972, CN introduced commuter service from Barrie to Toronto, as required by the Canadian Transport Commission. The service was transferred to Via Rail in 1978. As a result of federal government financial cutbacks to Via Rail, the service was transferred to the provincial government and integrated into the GO Transit network on September 7, 1982, but service only extended to Bradford. On September 17, 1990, the line was extended to Barrie, but was again cut back to Bradford on July 5, 1993.

=== Pre-2012 peak service expansion ===
On September 8, 1998, GO Transit added a second daily round trip to the line. In the early 2000s, GO Transit opened three new stations on the line: Rutherford on January 7, 2001; York University on September 6, 2002; and East Gwillimbury on November 1, 2004. By the end of 2005, the number of daily trains on the line had doubled again to four in each direction.

In 2006, GO Transit built a bridge at the Snider diamond, which is the junction between the Barrie Line and Canadian National's primary east–west freight line, the York Subdivision. Since CN controlled both corridors, the passage of passenger trains over the diamond was often delayed by freight trains passing through the intersection. Constructing the bridge and associated trackage resulted in a grade separation of the two lines, eliminating such delays. Construction of the bridge began in February 2006, and the bridge was opened in December 2006. The entire project was completed in June 2007.

On December 17, 2007, the Bradford Line was extended to the new Barrie South GO Station and was renamed the "Barrie Line". Construction had begun on February 2, 2007, to construct the new Barrie South station, a new layover facility and new tracks, signals and crossings along the existing 20 kilometres (12 mi) railway corridor. The project cost $25 million, funded by two thirds by the federal and provincial governments, and one third by the City of Barrie.

On December 15, 2009, Metrolinx purchased the portion of the Newmarket Subdivision within the City of Toronto from CN for $68 million. The Barrie line trackage, from Union Station to Barrie, is now fully owned by Metrolinx. As part of the agreement, the Canadian National Railway continues to serve five freight customers located on the Newmarket subdivision between Highway 401 and the CN York Subdivision.

On January 30, 2012, the Barrie line was extended north to the newly constructed Allandale Waterfront GO Station.

=== Off-peak service and further expansion ===
In the summer of 2012, a pilot train service was introduced on weekends and holidays between June and September. Two trains in each direction completed the entire route, while an additional four trains ran between Union Station and East Gwillimbury GO station. The summer service cost CA$520,000 to operate, including train crews, safety and enforcement, station staffing and fuel. Bidirectional weekend service was offered again in summer 2013, with four trains in each direction covering the entire route from Toronto to Barrie, making all stops and having a bus connection at Rutherford GO Station for non-stop service to Canada's Wonderland. It cost CA$400,000 to operate. For the summers of 2014, 2015 and 2016, the same train service was provided, but without non-stop buses to Canada's Wonderland, requiring those passengers to transfer instead to York Region Transit local bus service at Maple GO Station.

On December 31, 2016, year-round weekend train service was introduced with service every 75 minutes in both directions between Toronto and Aurora, including three daily trains per direction covering the full route between Toronto and Barrie.

On December 30, 2017, the Downsview Park GO Station (an intermodal station intersecting with the Toronto Transit Commission's (TTC) new Line 1 Yonge-University subway extension) opened, and service to York University station was correspondingly reduced to peak hours only. At the same time, the Barrie line's weekend train service was improved to every 60 minutes between Union and Aurora, and new hourly weekday off-peak service was introduced between Union and Aurora, as well as additional peak period trains between Union Station to Bradford GO Station. Although the station was intended to entirely replace York University GO Station, limited peak-period service was maintained to York University station following the opening of Downsview Park station.

Due to the temporary closure of the York University campus during the COVID-19 pandemic in Toronto, all service to York University GO Station was suspended on March 18, 2020. On July 19, 2021, Metrolinx announced that the station was permanently closed.

==== Davenport Diamond grade separation ====
Location of Davenport Diamond in Toronto

The Davenport Diamond was an at-grade rail-to-rail crossing of the GO Barrie line and east–west CP Rail North Toronto subdivision tracks near Davenport Road in Toronto. It was one of the busiest train intersections in North America. In order to increase service frequency on the Barrie line, GO Transit identified the need to remove the diamond and build a grade separated crossing. In 2015 Metrolinx initiated a Transit Project Assessment Process (an environmental assessment process specific to transit projects) based on the preferred option of constructing an overpass to carry the GO line over the east-west CP Rail line.

The grade separated crossing (which Metrolinx calls the Davenport Diamond Guideway) is on a 1.4-kilometre (0.9 mi) long, 8.5-metre (28 ft) high rail bridge. It lies between Bloor Street West and St. Clair Avenue West parallel to Lansdowne Avenue. The bridge will allow GO Transit to run all-day, two-way service on the Barrie line without freight traffic disruptions. The 2015 estimated cost of the project was $120 million.

The project began construction in 2017. The Davenport Diamond Guideway went into service on Monday April 3, 2023, and the grade-level Davenport Diamond went out of service on the prior weekend. The ground-level track approaching the diamond will be removed.

At the same time of building the guideway, further community improvements were added in the immediate vicinity, including noise wall and bearing pads, a rail overpass above Wallace Avenue and a pedestrian underpass at Paton Road, as well as a replacement of the Bloor Street West bridge.

Other grade separations are planned. One was completed at Rutherford Road immediately north of Rutherford GO Station, and another is planned at McNaughton Road north of Maple GO Station.

== Stations ==
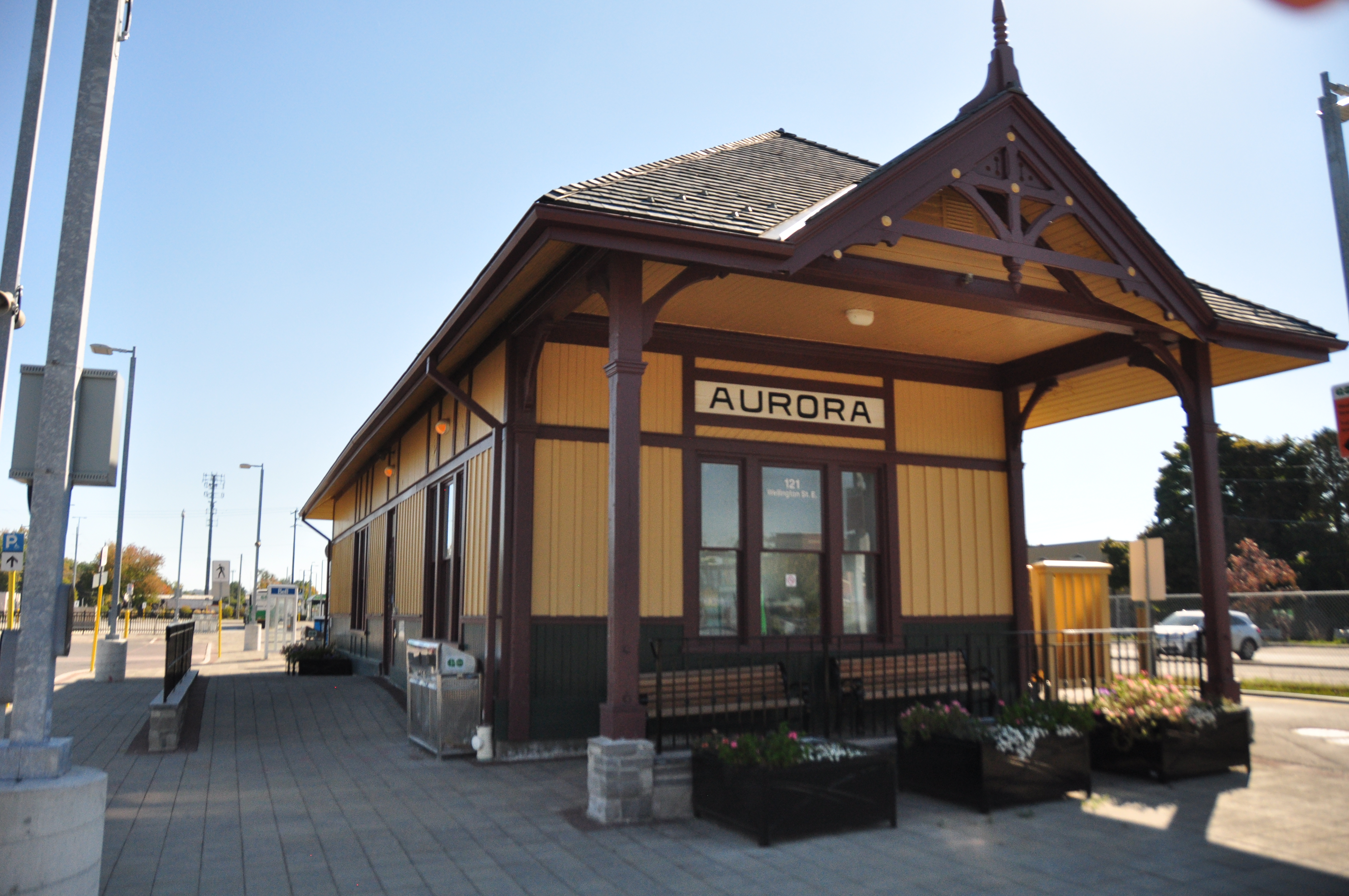
The Aurora station building is a federally designated heritage site

There are 11 stations on the Barrie line, including the terminus at Union Station in Toronto. Two new stations with connections to the Toronto subway are under construction.

In addition to Union Station, four station buildings along the Barrie line are federally protected by the Heritage Railway Stations Protection Act. At Allandale Waterfront and Newmarket stations, historic station buildings remain but are used for other purposes, while at Aurora and Maple stations, the historic stations buildings continue to be in use. The station building at King City was built in 2005; the 1850s building was relocated to Black Creek Pioneer Village in the 1960s, then to King Township Museum in 1989. Bradford station is not protected and has been heavily altered.

Station	Opened	Parking spots	Notes
Allandale Waterfront	January 28, 2012	120	Federally designated heritage railway station built in 1904–1905 for Grand Trunk Railway (GTR).
Barrie South	December 17, 2007	628	
Innisfil	Approved	–	
Bradford	September 7, 1982	355	GTR Bradford Station built in 1900 has been heavily altered from original design.
East Gwillimbury	November 1, 2004	637	
Newmarket	September 7, 1982	265	Connection to Viva Yellow; Federally designated heritage railway station was GTR station c. 1900. Northern Railway of Canada station from 1850s became freight shed and demolished.
Aurora	September 7, 1982	1,464	Federally designated heritage railway station built by GTR in 1900.
King City	September 7, 1982	555	Original 1853 Northern Railway of Canada station moved to King Township Museum in 1989 and current station built in 2005. Connection to Ontario Northland bus services.
Maple	September 7, 1982	1,319	Federally designated heritage railway station built by GTR in 1903.
Rutherford	January 7, 2001	970	
Downsview Park	December 30, 2017	0	Connection to Yonge–University
Caledonia	Under construction	–	Future connection to Eglinton
Junction Triangle	Under construction	–	Future connection to Bloor–Danforth
Spadina-Front	Approved	–	Future connection to 510 Spadina streetcar
Union	September 7, 1982	0	Connection to Via Rail, Amtrak, Union Pearson Express, GO Transit rail & bus services, Ontario Northland and TTC Yonge–University, streetcar and bus services. Federally designated heritage railway station, built by Toronto Terminals Railway opened in 1927

== Service ==
As of November 2019, the Barrie line has weekday service consisting of seven trains southbound from Barrie and three trains southbound from Bradford in the morning, and seven trains northbound to Barrie and two trains northbound to Bradford from Union Station in the afternoon. The line also has hourly, two-way service between Union and Aurora during off peak times.

Weekend service consists of hourly trains in both directions. Five trips in each direction cover the full route from Toronto to Barrie, while the remainder operate between Toronto and Aurora. Trips terminating in Aurora have connecting GO bus service to Barrie.

During the times and directions that train service does not operate, service is provided by GO bus routes 63 (Toronto–King City), 65 (Toronto–Newmarket) and 68 (Newmarket–Barrie).

The maximum speed on the line is 128 kilometres per hour (80 mph), between Bradford and Barrie South. Trains are limited to 24 kilometres per hour (15 mph) in some parts, but can travel at least 80 kilometres per hour (50 mph) over most of the line.

Due to the COVID-19 pandemic, starting on May 13, 2020, most off-peak train service was suspended and replaced with buses due to low ridership. Off-peak train service was gradually reintroduced throughout 2021.

=== Connections ===
The Barrie line makes connections with:

- Barrie Transit
- York Region Transit
- Toronto Transit Commission
- Via Rail
- Simcoe County LINX
- BWG Transit
- Ontario Northland
- Innisfil Transit

== Future ==
=== Capacity expansion ===
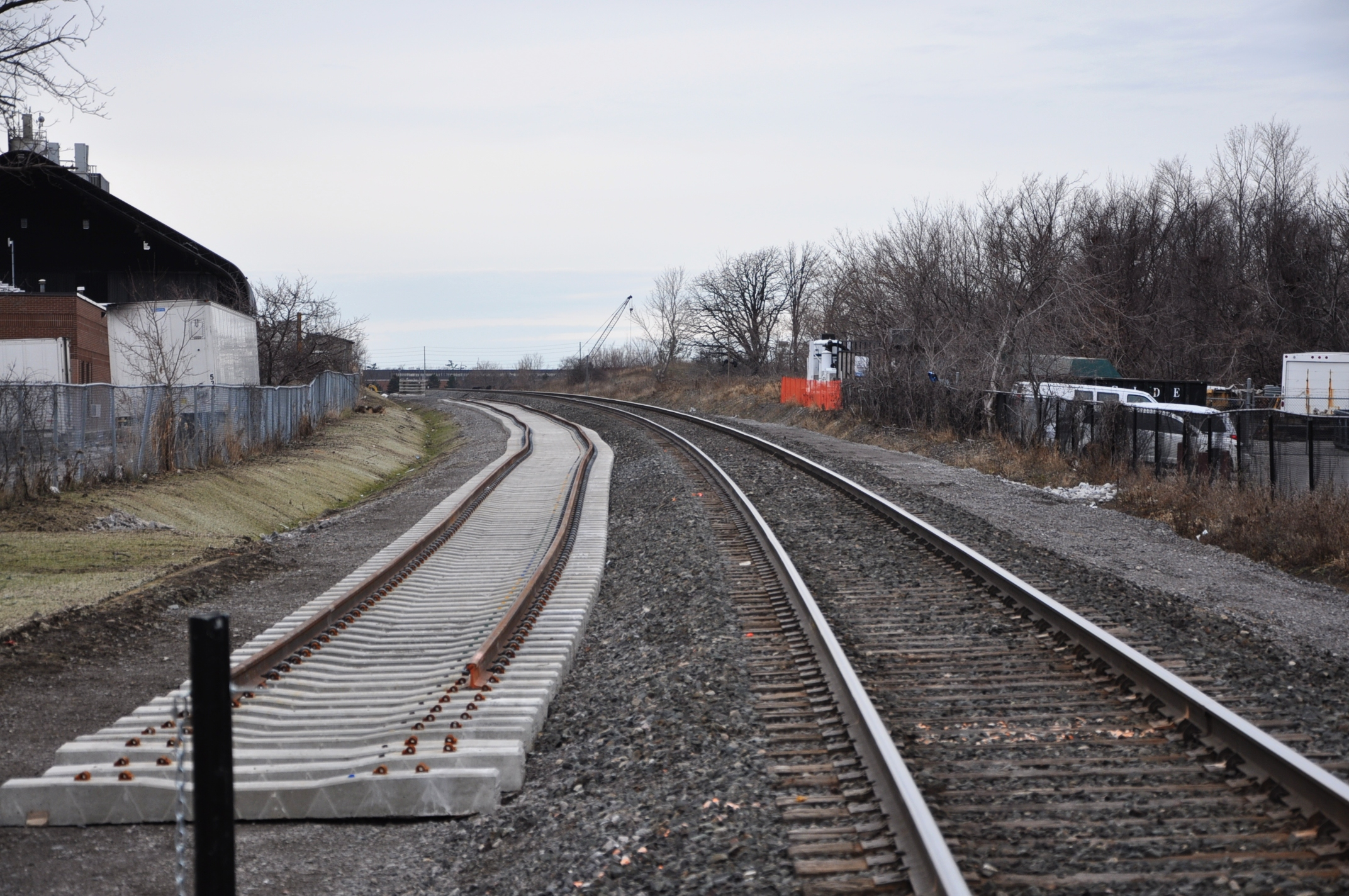
Second track under construction in 2015 between Rutherford and York University stations

In April 2015, the government of Ontario announced that as part of a broad GO Transit expansion project called Regional Express Rail, service on the Barrie line would increase from 7 daily train trips to over 20 daily train trips by 2020. (Note: As of April 2015, there are seven daily southbound weekday morning trains on the Barrie line, and seven daily northbound weekday evening trains.) The railway electrification system was planned to be completed by 2024 and feature two-way, all-day service every 15 minutes between Union Station and Aurora GO. However, on August 12, 2021, Metrolinx announced that, after electrification there would be 15-minute, two-way, all-day service beyond Aurora to Bradford, and 30-minute two-way, all-day service to Barrie South and Allandale Waterfront.

=== Additional stations ===
In the September 2015 planning document "New Station Analysis", an initial list of 22 potential GO station sites were identified. These were, from north to south, at Innisfil, Holland Yard, Mulock Drive, St John's Sideroad, Yonge Street, Bathurst Street at Side Road 15, Dufferin Street, Kirby Road, Keele Street at Teston Road, Langstaff Road, Highway 7, Steeles Avenue, Finch Avenue, Downsview Park, Wilson Avenue, Lawrence Avenue, Caledonia Road, Rogers Road, St Clair Avenue West, Davenport Road, Dupont Street, and Bloor Street.

Of these, most were rejected as unsuitable, either because they were too close to other stations, or for failing to meet other criteria, such as connections to other services, proximity to urban growth centres, construction viability, urban density, or necessary infrastructure. Others were rejected because they were considered for other lines on the network. Four sites were considered for either the Barrie line or the Kitchener line. The sites at Highway 7 in Vaughan and at St Clair Avenue West were not included as part of the 10-year RER expansion, but are part of a future expansion program. The candidate location Bathurst Street at Side Road 15 was deferred for future consideration.

Stations have been approved in Vaughan for the Kirby Road site (serving the community of Hope), at Mulock Drive in Newmarket, and in Innisfil. Under the Regional Express Rail initiative, new stations have been approved or are under construction in Toronto: Spadina–Front, Junction Triangle, and Caledonia.

==== Spadina-Front station ====
Spadina-Front is an approved future station that will be located at the intersection of Spadina Avenue and Front Street (with access to the CityPlace neighbourhood and 510 Spadina streetcars).

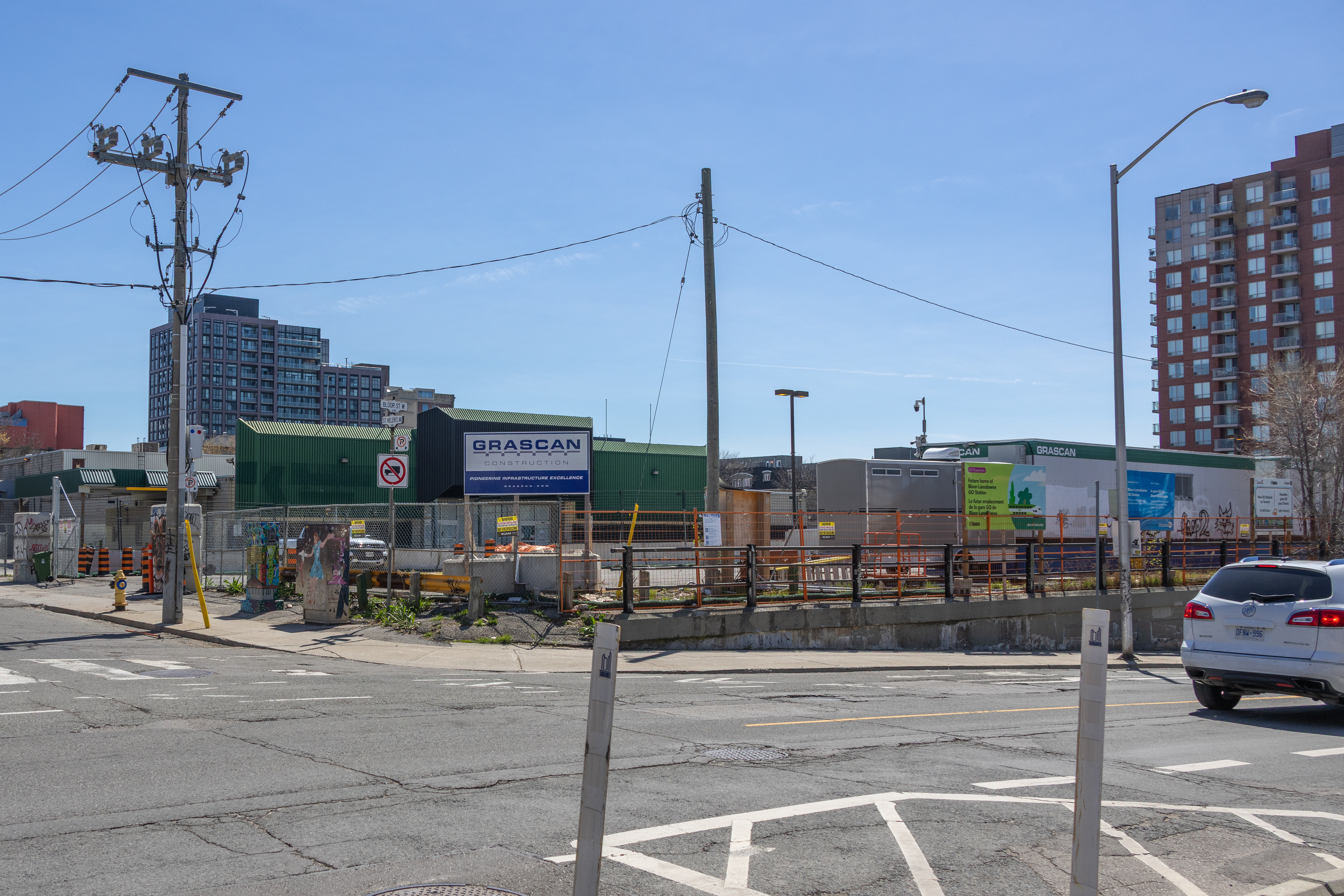
Junction Triangle GO station under construction in April 2026

==== Junction Triangle station ====
Junction Triangle station was announced in June 2016, and is currently under construction east of the intersection of Bloor Street West and Lansdowne Avenue and will connect with Lansdowne subway station on Line 2 Bloor–Danforth. The station is named after the Junction Triangle neighbourhood where it will be located.

==== Caledonia station ====
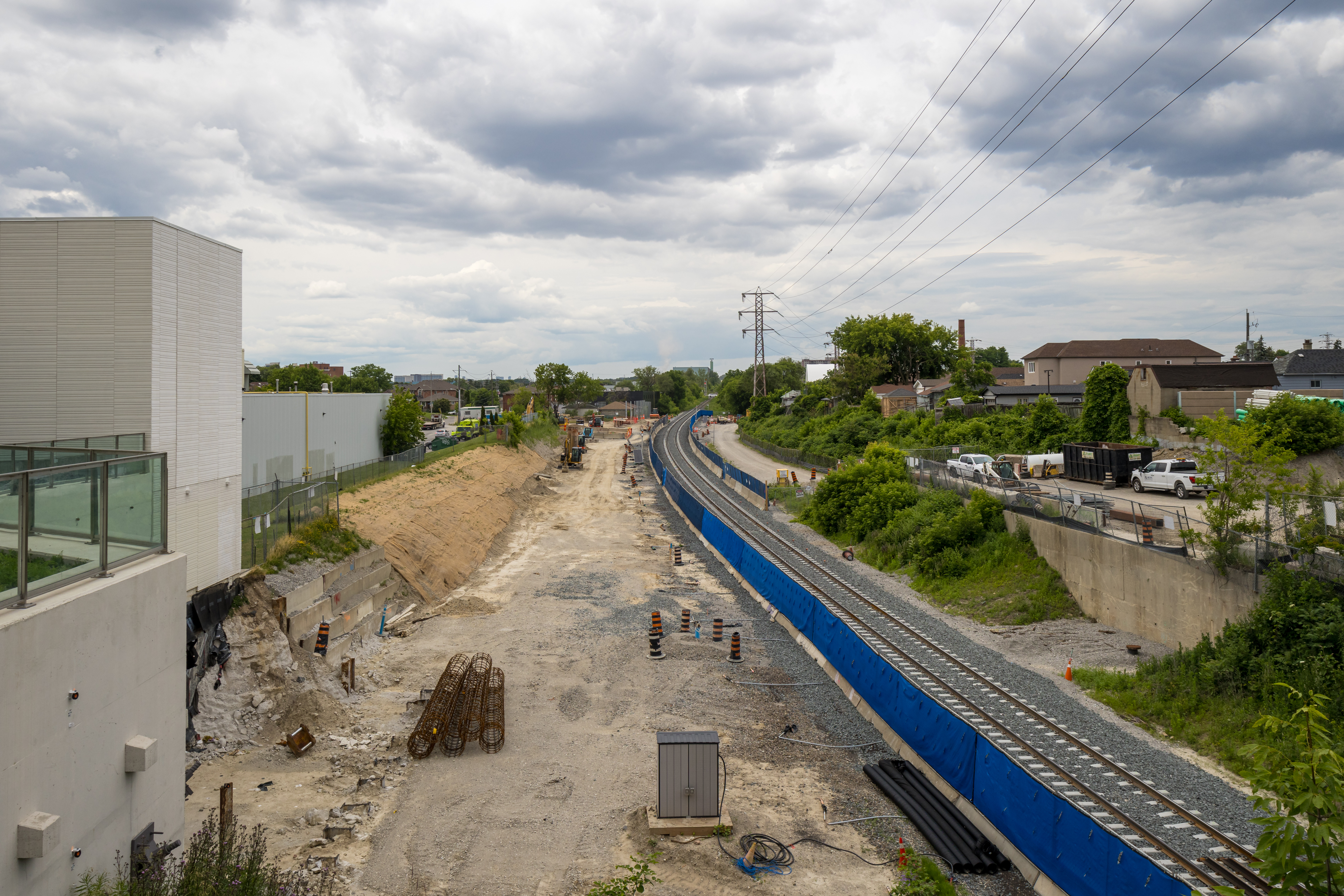
Caledonia GO station platform (and double-tracking) under construction in June 2026

Caledonia station is an under-construction station that is being built as part of the Caledonia station complex and will interchange with Line 5 Eglinton, a partially underground light rail line, and was announced on May 2015. Construction of the GO portion of the station was expected to take two years and began in October 2025.

==== Concord station ====
To provide an interchange with Viva, a bus rapid transit service in York Region, a new station was proposed at Highway 7. The site was called Concord station, after the Concord neighborhood in which it would be located. The city of Vaughan has integrated the station into its design plans for a mixed use development near the intersection of Highway 407 and the rail corridor. Both the municipal government of Vaughan and the regional government of York have identified this location as a potential site for the station, which requires GO Transit to perform an environmental assessment. In January 2013, Vaughan municipal clerk sent a Vaughan City Council resolution to York Regional Council requesting Metrolinx consideration for four priority projects, among them all-day two-way service on the Barrie line, creation of the Concord GO Station, and creation of a Kirby Road GO Station. The station would be located near the old CN Concord Station (located north of Highway 7 on east side of tracks on the current Barrie line) that dated back to the Northern Railway of Canada Thornhill Station c. 1853 and demolished in 1978. In 2023, a business case for the station was released.

==== Innisfil station ====
Metrolinx is considering a station in Innisfil for a future expansion, to be located at approximately mile marker 52 (kilometre 83.7). They analyzed two sites just east of Sideroad 20: 5th Line near the community of Lefroy and 6th Line near a future residential development in south Alcona. Innisfil town council stated its preference for the 6th Line location, which was ultimately chosen by Metrolinx, and approved use of $2 million to acquire land and $2.6 million to partially fund the station's construction.

== Ridership ==
In 2012, the Barrie line served about 7,500 passengers a day, or approximately 2 million per year. By 2008, the annual number of riders on the Barrie line was almost 3.1 million, an increase of 18% from 2007 and 167% from 2001. About 2,300 of the 3,000 daily peak passengers to Union Station boarded at Aurora (about 1,000), Rutherford (about 800), and Newmarket (about 500) that year.

The weekend summer service had 105 riders per train in 2012 (32,000 total for six trains per day), and 220 riders per train in 2013 (41,000 total for four trains per day).

From 2010 to 2014, ridership on the line increased 70% based on cordon count data. For 2015, there was a weekday morning peak of 5,852 boardings and 227 alightings at the stations on the line, all other passengers alighting at Union Station in Toronto.

2015 weekday morning peak ridership
Station	Boardings	Alightings
Allandale Waterfront	254	0
Barrie South	263	0
Bradford	229	2
East Gwillimbury	337	5
Newmarket	358	15
Aurora	1,113	15
King City	444	1
Maple	1,701	2
Rutherford	1,121	22
York University	32	165
