= Maple GO Station =

Train station in Vaughan, Ontario

Maple
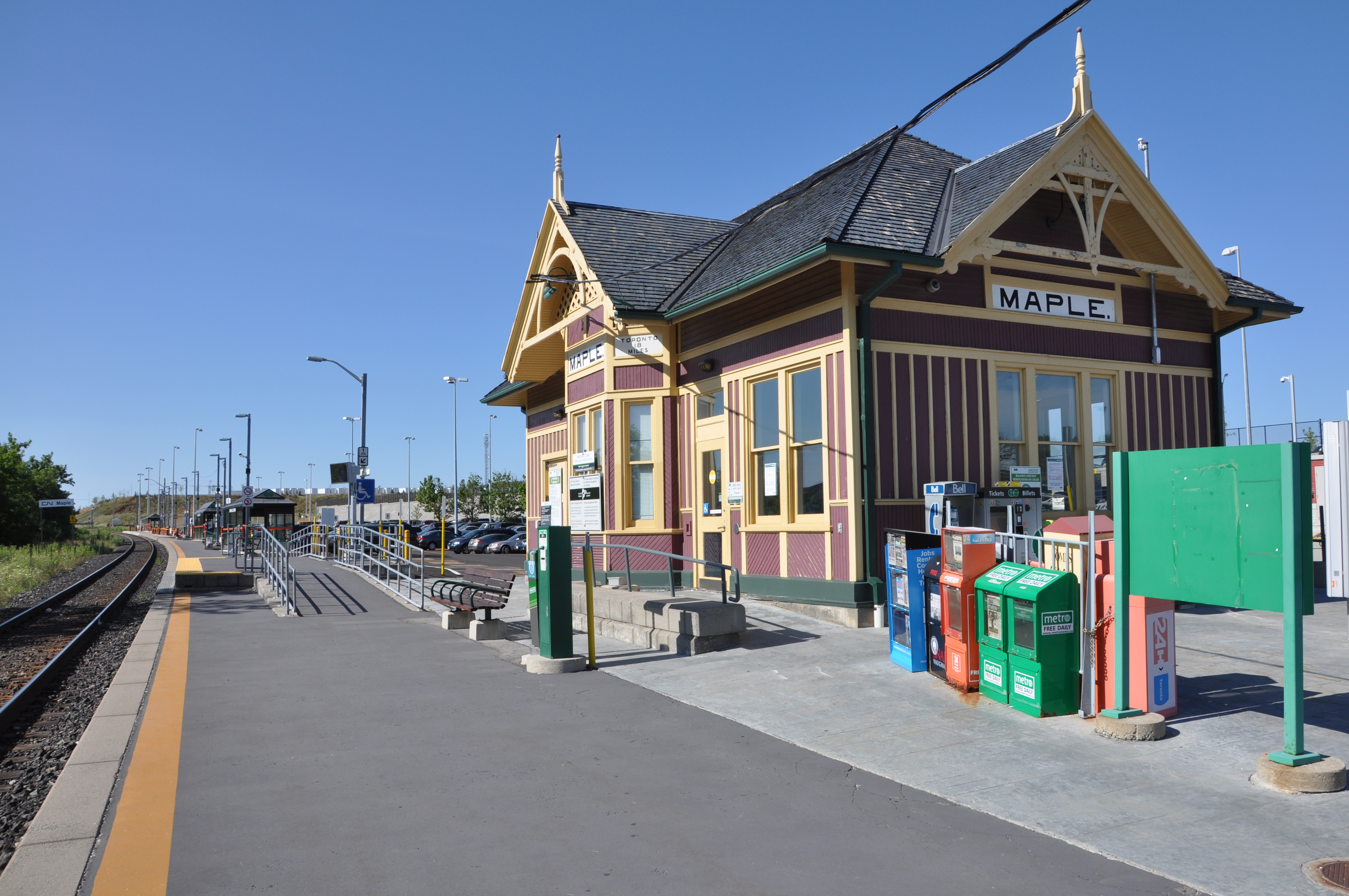
- Station building and platform in 2012

General information
- Location: 30 Station Street; Vaughan, Ontario; Canada
- Coordinates: 43°51′34″N 79°30′25″W
- Owner: Metrolinx
- Platforms: 1 side platform
- Tracks: 1
- Bus routes: 65
- Connections: York Region Transit

Construction
- Structure type: Historic wood frame Grand Trunk Railway station building
- Parking: 1146 spaces
- Cycle facilities: Yes
- Accessible: Yes

Other information
- Station code: GO Transit: MP
- Fare zone: 61

History
- Opened: 1853; 173 years ago (OS&H)
- Rebuilt: 1903 (GTR); 1982 (GOT)

Services
Preceding station	GO Transit	Following station
King City towards Allandale Waterfront	Barrie	Rutherford towards Union
Former services
Preceding station	Canadian National Railway	Following station
King toward North Bay	North Bay – Toronto	Concord toward Toronto

Heritage Railway Station (Canada)
- Designated: 1992
- Reference no.: 6765

Ontario Heritage Act
- Official name: Maple Heritage Conservation District
- Designated: 2005
Location

Maple GO Station is a train and bus station on GO Transit's Barrie line, located in Vaughan, Ontario, Canada. It is Ontario's oldest operating railway station, with passenger service dating back to 1853.

== History ==
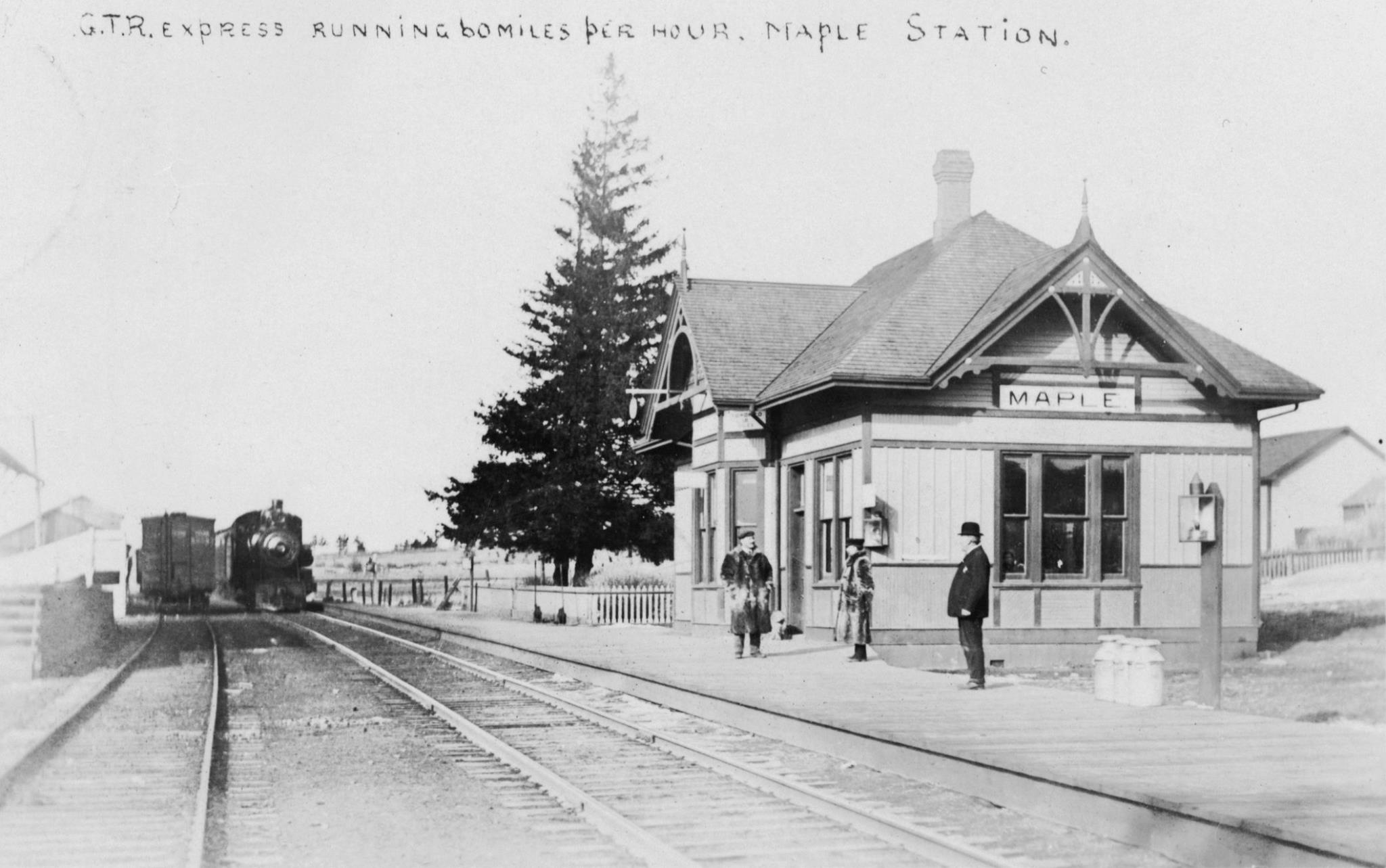
The Maple Grand Trunk station in 1909.

Maple Station opened on May 16, 1853, when the service began on the Ontario, Simcoe, and Huron Railroad between Toronto and Machell's Corners (now Aurora). At the time, the station was named "Richmond Hill", despite being 6 kilometres (3.7 mi) west of that community. A coach service was run between Richmond Hill and Maple to connect with the namesake town. Train service was extended to Barrie later in 1853, and to Collingwood in 1855.

The current station building was constructed in 1903 by the Grand Trunk Railway to replace the original Ontario, Simcoe and Huron building, which had burned down. It was named Maple after completion. The Queen Anne style timber frame structure is clad in wood using stick style patterns, and features large gables in its roofline. It is federally protected by the Heritage Railway Stations Protection Act. The building is also protected under Part V of the Ontario Heritage Act, as part of the Maple Heritage Conservation District.

The building underwent renovations that were completed in January 2014 for CA$1.7 million. It included repairs to the facade and interior, replacement of the floor, and an upgrade to the accessibility ramps. An additional 60 parking spaces were added to the station in the spring of 2015.

The station will undergo a redevelopment starting in 2019 including the addition of a second rail track, new rail platforms with a full canopy, two pedestrian tunnels to connect the new platforms, more parking, and the bus loop will be upgraded.

== Services ==
As of January 2018, train service operates approximately every 15–30 minutes in the morning peak period, every 30 minutes in the afternoon peak period and every hour at other times. Outside of peak periods, most trains terminate at Aurora with connecting buses for stations further north.

On weekends and holidays, service operates approximately hourly between Aurora and Toronto. Three daily trains in each direction cover the full route from Barrie to Toronto, while the remainder have bus connections at Aurora station for stations further north.

== Connecting transit ==
York Region Transit:

- 26 Maple
- 87 Autumn Hill

== In film ==
- The station was used in a 1981 episode of The Littlest Hobo.

== See also ==
- List of designated heritage railway stations of Canada
