= Sheppard West =

Sheppard West may refer to either of two adjacent subway stations on Toronto's Line 1 Yonge–University:

- Sheppard West station, a Toronto subway station, which was originally named Downsview until May 7, 2017
- Downsview Park station, a station on the Toronto–York Spadina Subway Extension (TYSSE), originally called Sheppard West during planning and construction
