= Barrie South GO Station =

Train station in Barrie, Ontario

Barrie South
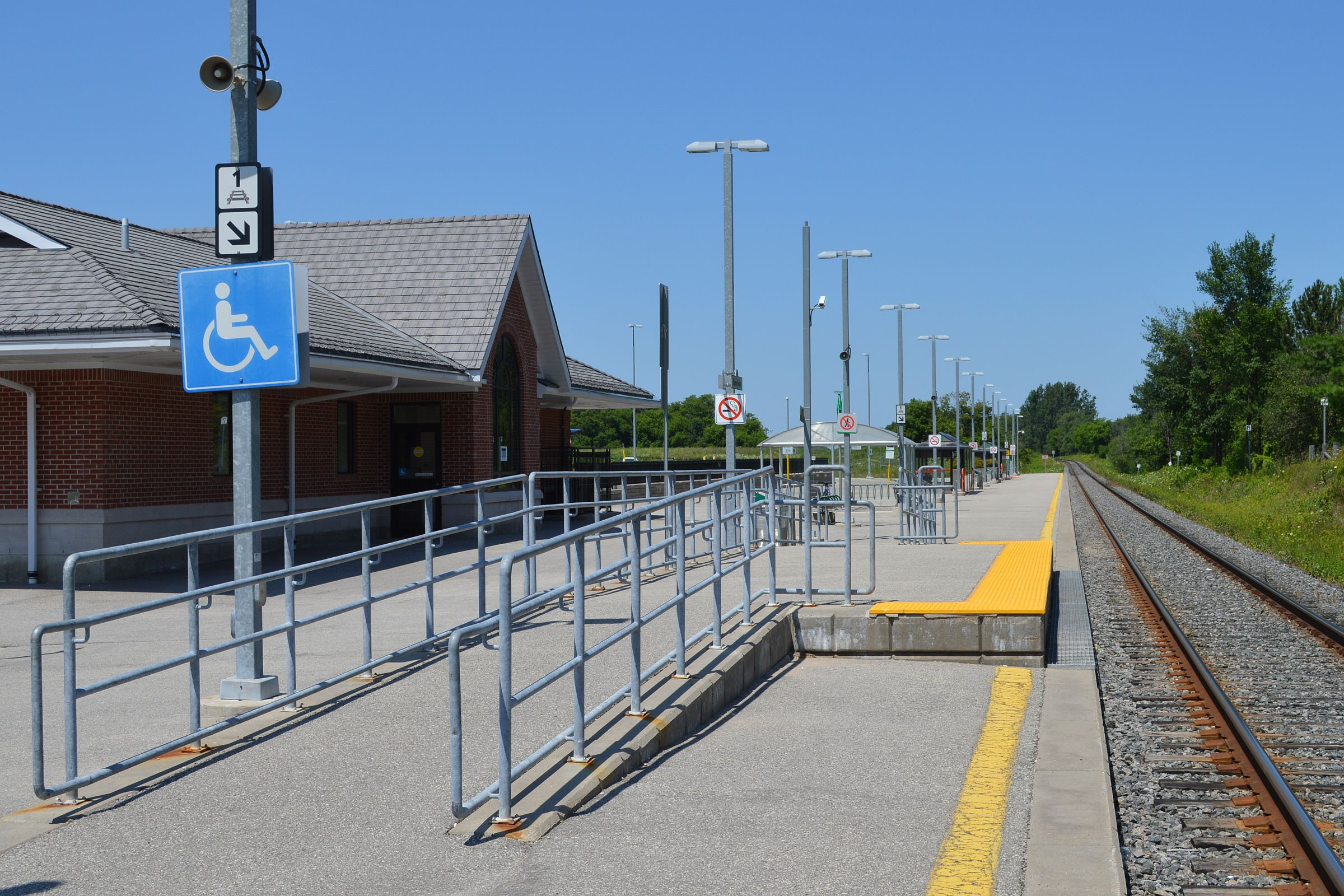
- Station platform in 2013

General information
- Location: 833 Yonge Street; Barrie, Ontario; Canada
- Coordinates: 44°21′04″N 79°37′39″W
- Owner: Metrolinx
- Platforms: 1 side platform
- Tracks: 1
- Bus routes: 68
- Bus stands: 8 bus bays
- Connections: Barrie Transit

Construction
- Structure type: At-grade
- Parking: 623 spaces
- Cycle facilities: Yes
- Accessible: Yes

Other information
- Station code: GO Transit: BA
- Fare zone: 68

History
- Opened: 17 December 2007; 18 years ago

Services
Preceding station	GO Transit	Following station
Allandale Waterfront Terminus	Barrie	Bradford towards Union
Location

Barrie South GO Station is a train and bus station on the GO Transit Barrie line, located in Barrie, Ontario, Canada.

Barrie Transit buses provide public transit access to the rest of the city. As of January 2012, the station is used by about 700 passengers per day, up from 350 at the time of its opening.

== History ==
Construction of the station began in June 2007 and the station began operating on December 17, 2007, with the first train departing at 05:43 that day.

The station's opening restored GO train service to Barrie, which had been eliminated in the 1990s.

== Services ==
Barrie South station has weekday train service consisting of 7 trains southbound to Union Station in the morning, and 7 trains returning northbound from Union Station in the afternoon. At other times, GO bus route 68 operates hourly to Aurora GO Station where passengers can transfer to the all-day train service to Toronto.

Weekend train service consists of 5 trains in each direction throughout the day. GO bus route 68 also operates hourly to Aurora GO station or East Gwillimbury GO station where passengers can connect to the hourly weekend train service to Toronto.
