= Barrie Transit =

Canadian transport company

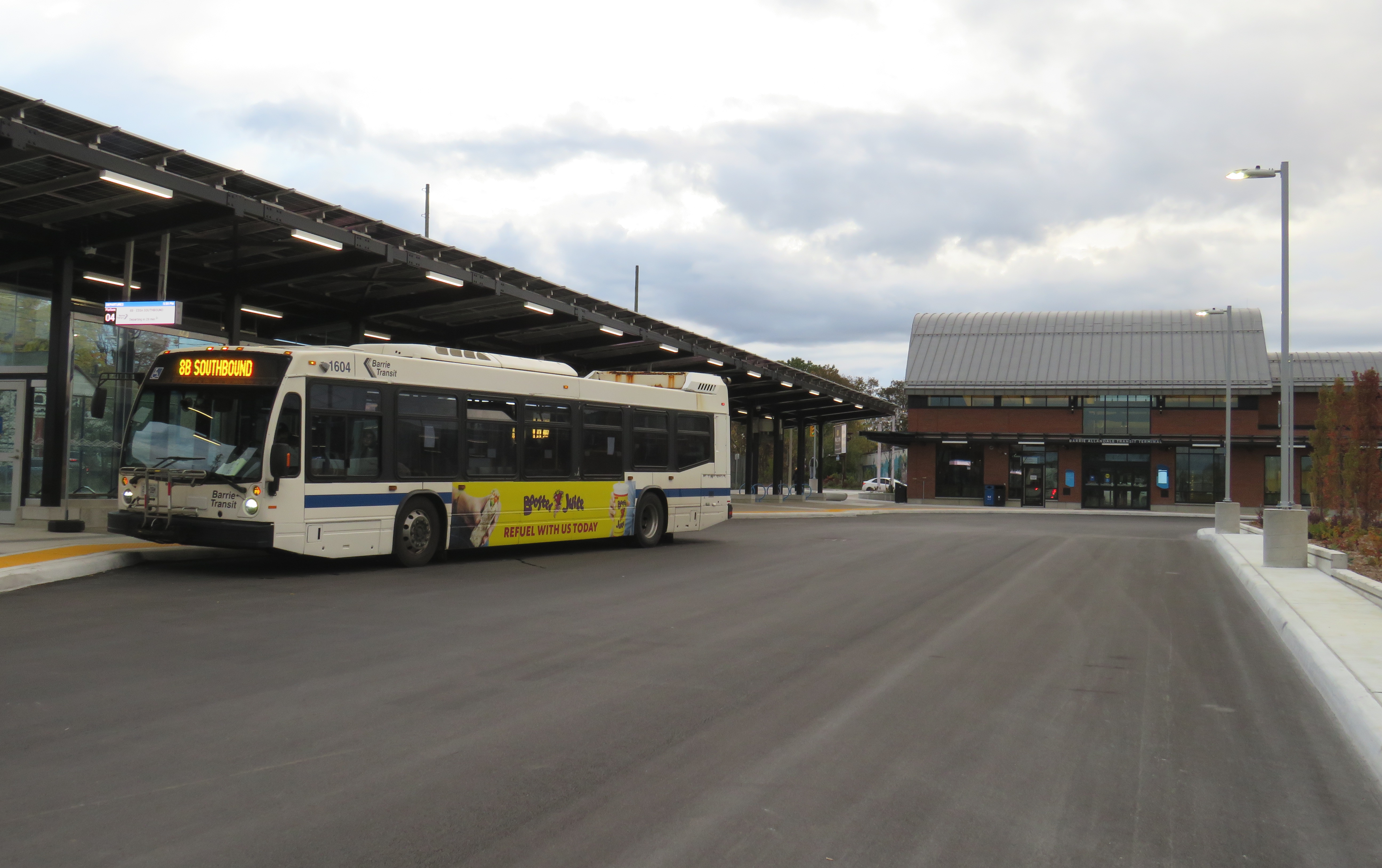
- Barrie Transit Nova Bus LFS at the Barrie Allandale Transit Terminal in 2025
- Parent: City of Barrie
- Founded: 1972 (as Barrie City Transit)
- Headquarters: 70 Collier Street; Barrie, Ontario
- Locale: Barrie, Ontario
- Service area: Simcoe County
- Service type: Bus service
- Routes: 11
- Stops: 648
- Hubs: 7
- Fleet: 47 conventional buses 14 specialized service buses
- Daily ridership: 4,100,000 (2024)
- Operator: MVT Canadian Bus
- Director: Brent Forsyth
- Website: Official website

Barrie Transit is a public transport bus operator serving the city of Barrie in Simcoe County in Ontario, Canada. Barrie Transit began operations in 1972 as Barrie City Transit. In 2024, the system had a ridership of 4.1 million.

== Fares ==
Fares are as of February 12th, 2026. The cash fare is $3.50 for most fare types, and $3.00 for senior fares.

Customers paying their bus fares with cash may request a paper transfer from the bus driver. A transfer is valid for 90 minutes from the time of first boarding, allowing customers to transfer freely between Barrie Transit buses in any direction during the transfer's validity period.

Children (ages 12 and under) and visually impaired people can travel fare free on Barrie Transit. Seniors (ages 65 and older) with a valid photo identification can travel fare free on Tuesdays and Thursdays.

=== Passes and Ride Cards ===
Passes are available in day and monthly passes. Day passes purchased on the bus must be used on the same day it was purchased.

Ride cards are scratch cards that come with 10 rides. Riders must scratch off one ride in view of the bus operator.

Fare Type	Price	Notes
Individual day pass	$8.50 / day	
Family day pass	$10.00 / day	Valid for two adults, seniors, and/or students
Adult monthly pass	$94.00 / month	Valid for ages 19 to 64
Student monthly pass	$72.00 / month	Valid for ages 13 and older, valid photo ID required upon boarding
Senior monthly pass	$54.50 / month	Valid for ages 65 and older, valid photo ID required upon boarding
Adult 10-ride card	$30.00	Valid for ages 19 to 64
Student 10-ride card	$26.00	Valid for ages 13 and older, valid photo ID required upon boarding
Senior 10-ride card	$21.00	Valid for ages 65 and older, valid photo ID required upon boarding

=== GO Transit Connection ===
For customers connecting to or from the GO train on the Barrie line at Allandale Waterfront GO and Barrie South GO stations, the Barrie Transit fare is waived as long as a valid Presto card or Transit ticket is presented to the bus driver and the arrival or departure train time is within 30 minutes of that GO station.

== Services ==
As of June 8th, 2026, Barrie Transit operates 11 conventional routes. All routes are wheelchair accessible.

- Route 2: Dunlop/Park Place
- Route 7: Grove/Bear Creek
- Route 8A: RVH/Yonge
- Route 8B: Crosstown/Essa
- Route 10: North Loop, Clockwise
- Route 11: North Loop, Counterclockwise
- Route 12: Georgian Mall/Barrie South GO
- Route 15: Mapleview Construction Shuttle
- Route 100: Red
- Route 101: Blue
- Route 400: RVH/Park Place, Express

Barrie Transit also has regional transit connections with GO Transit, LINX Transit, and Ontario Northland.

Daily operation of Specialized Transit (formally known as BACTS) is provided under contract by MVT Canadian Bus.

== Facilities ==
=== Major Facilities ===
Facility	Address & coordinates	Opened	Notes
Barrie City Hall	70 Collier Street; 44°23′27″N 79°41′11″W	1985	Headquarters
Transit Garage	133 Welham Road; 44°21′10″N 79°40′15″W	2015	
Downtown Mini Hub	24 Maple Avenue; 44°23′16″N 79°41′26″W	1991	Formerly known as Barrie Bus Terminal
Barrie Allandale Transit Terminal	24 Essa Road; 44°22′27″N 79°41′16″W	2025	

=== Terminals and Hubs ===
Location	Routes	Other connections
Barrie Allandale Transit Terminal	7, 8, 12	GO Transit, LINX Transit, Ontario Northland
Barrie South GO	8, 12	GO Transit
Downtown Mini Hub	2, 7, 8, 10, 11, 12, 100, 101	
Georgian College	7, 8, 10, 11, 100, 101, 400	LINX Transit
Georgian Mall	8, 10, 11, 12, 100, 101	
Park Place Terminal	2, 7, 8, 12, 400	
Royal Victoria Hospital	8, 100, 101, 400	LINX Transit

== Fleet ==
Barrie Transit's fleet currently consists of 47 40-foot, conventional buses, and 14 specialized service buses.

- New Flyer
  - 2011 XD40: 1101–1103
  - 2012 XD40: 1201–1203
  - 2013 XD40: 1302–1304
  - 2014 XD40: 1404
  - 2025 XE40: 2501E–2502E
- Nova Bus
  - 2015 4th-Gen LFS: 1501–1504
  - 2016 4th-Gen LFS: 1601–1604
  - 2017 4th-Gen LFS: 1701–1713
  - 2020 4th-Gen LFS: 2001–2002
  - 2021 4th-Gen LFS: 2101–2103
  - 2022 4th-Gen LFS: 2201–2206
  - 2023 4th-Gen LFS: 2301–2303
- Chevrolet
  - 2014 Spirit of Mobility 26D: 1610
  - 2015 Spirit of Mobility 26G: 1720
  - 2018 Spirit of Mobility 26: 1830–1831
  - 2019 Spirit of Mobility 26: 1960–1961
  - 2020 Spirit of Mobility 26: 2020–2026
- Creative Carriage
  - 2025 CS-2: 2564

== See also ==
- Public transport in Canada
