= Downsview Park station =

Transit station in Toronto, Ontario, Canada

Downsview Park
- Downsview Park station building

General information
- Location: 25 Vitti Street, Toronto, Ontario; Canada
- Coordinates: 43°45′13″N 79°28′43″W
- Operator: Metrolinx; Toronto Transit Commission
- Platforms: 1 centre platform (TTC); 1 side platform + 1 under construction (GO Transit)
- Tracks: 2 (TTC); 1 + 1 under construction (GO Transit)
- Bus routes: TTC buses: 84 Sheppard West; 101 Downsview Park; 106 Sentinel; 108 Driftwood; 384 Sheppard West; 984A Sheppard West Express

Construction
- Parking: None
- Accessible: Yes
- Architect: Aedas
- Architectural style: Postmodern architecture

Other information
- Station code: GO Transit: DW
- Website: Official station page

History
- Opened: December 17, 2017; 8 years ago

Passengers
- 2023–2024; Apr-Dec 2019: 5,618 (TTC); 451 daily (GO Transit)
- Rank: 66 of 70 (TTC)

Services
Preceding station	Toronto Transit Commission	Following station
Finch West towards Vaughan	Line 1 Yonge–University	Sheppard West towards Finch
Preceding station	GO Transit	Following station
Rutherford towards Allandale Waterfront	Barrie	Union Terminus
Location

Downsview Park station is an intermodal transit station in North York, a district of Toronto, Ontario, Canada. It serves Line 1 Yonge–University of the Toronto subway and GO Transit's Barrie commuter rail line. Subway service began on December 17, 2017, and GO Train service began on December 30, 2017. Downsview Park station is a fully integrated multi-modal transit facility serving both transit lines. This is in contrast to most other interchanges between TTC subway and GO Transit rail lines, which have separate structures for each agency.

As of 2024, the station is the fifth-least used on the heavy-rail subway system, and the least used of the stations built as part of the subway extension to Vaughan.

== History ==
The official ground breaking ceremony for the Toronto–York Spadina subway extension (TYSSE) was held on November 27, 2009; with tunnelling operations beginning in June 2011. The station opened on December 17, 2017, along with the rest of the extension. It opened to GO Transit service on December 30, 2017, on the same day that a major service increase was inaugurated on the Barrie line.

This station, along with the five other TYSSE stations, were the first to be opened without collectors, although collector booths were installed as per original station plans. It was also among the first eight stations to discontinue sales of legacy TTC fare media (tokens and senior/youth tickets). Presto vending machines were available at its opening to sell Presto cards and to load funds or monthly passes onto them. On May 3, 2019, this station became one of the first ten stations to sell Presto tickets via the Presto vending machines.

TTC ridership statistics for 2018 showed that Downsview Park was the least used station on the heavy-rail subway system, dethroning Bessarion on Line 4 Sheppard. However, by 2022, ridership at Downsview Park had increased to 8,845 riders per weekday versus 4,269 for Bessarion, again making Bessarion the least used station.

== Services ==
TTC Line 1 operates every 5 minutes or better all day, every day.

The GO Transit Barrie Line operates approximately every 15–30 minutes during the morning peak period, every 30 minutes during the afternoon peak period, and every 60 minutes outside of peak periods including on weekends and holidays.

== Subway platform ==
=== Name ===
Originally slated to be called Sheppard West, the station was referred to by that name throughout its construction. However, in 2010, approval was granted for the station to be named Downsview Park, contingent upon successful negotiations between the Toronto Transit Commission, the City of Toronto, and Downsview Park regarding property acquisition. As part of this agreement, the existing Downsview station was renamed Sheppard West. Other names considered for this station were GO/Sheppard, Chesswood, Bakersfield, and Carl Hall.

=== Description ===
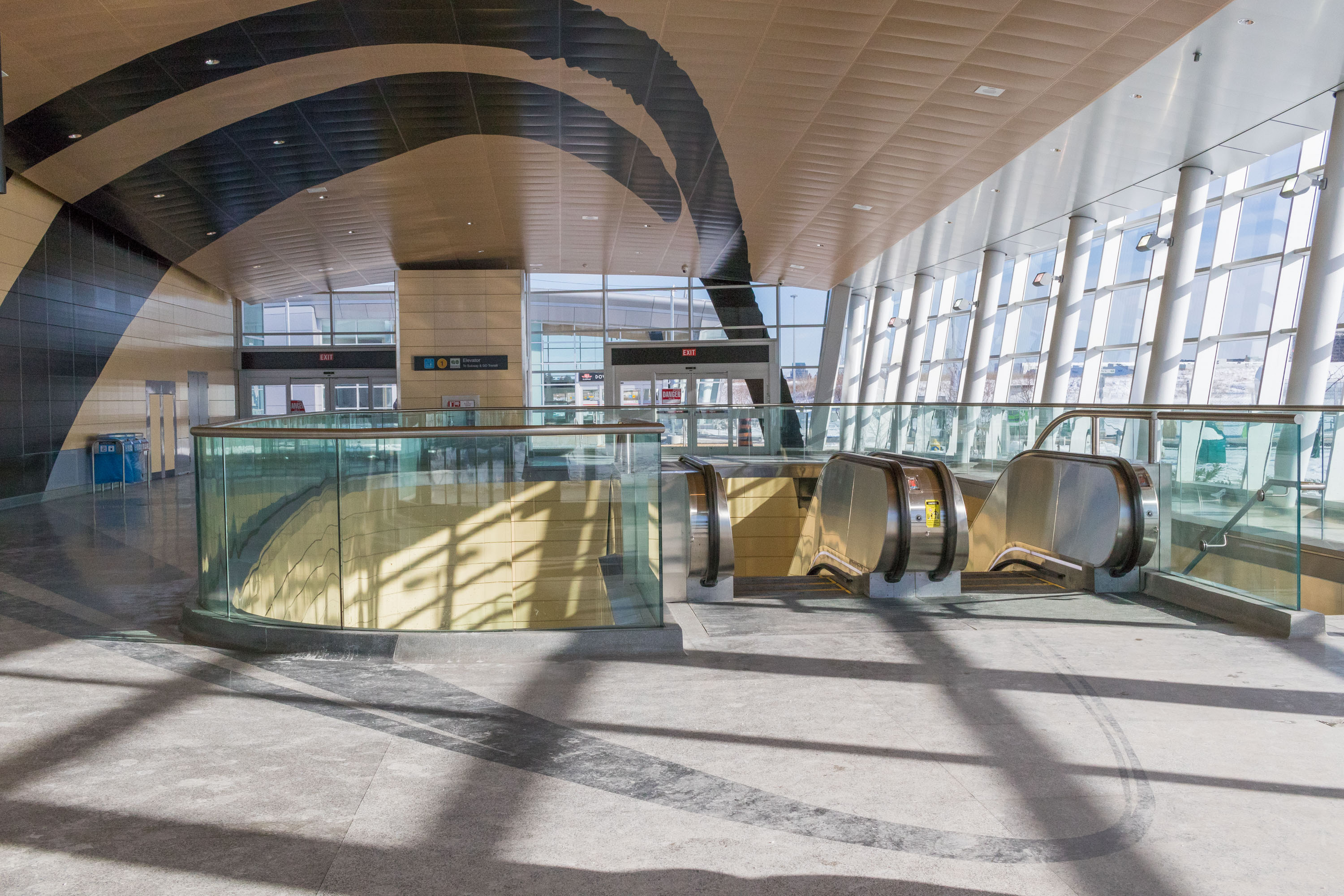
Spin by Panya Clark Espinal

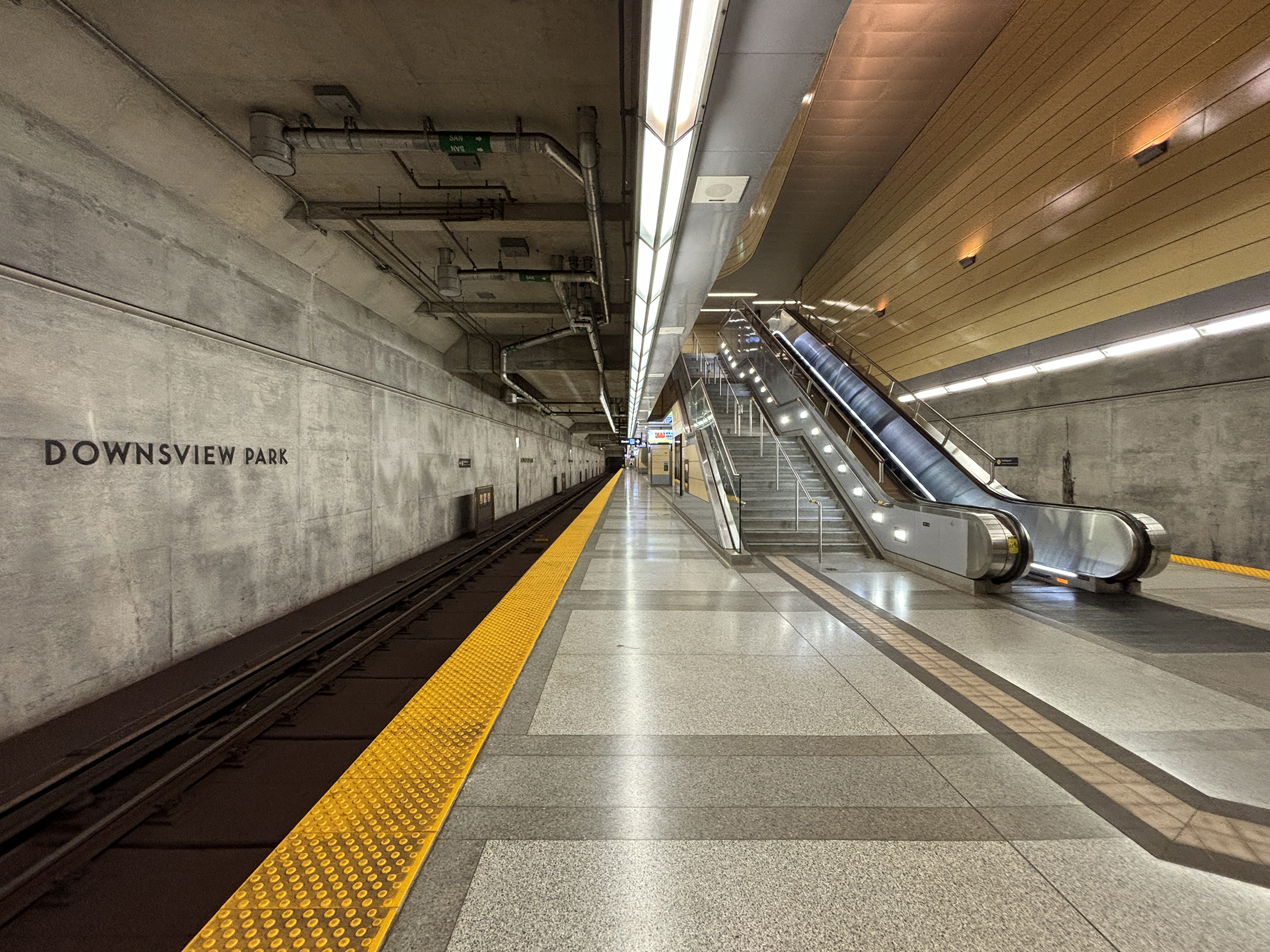
Line 1 subway platform

The subway platform is underground on an east–west orientation parallel to Sheppard Avenue West. It is one of three stations on Line 1 with an east–west orientation, the others being Union and St. George. An intermediate concourse level is located below ground between the subway and GO platforms. GO Transit has committed to cost-sharing at this station. A roadway named Vitti Street on the west side of the station provides vehicle access and passenger pick-up/drop-off. To the east and west of the station, the line swings broadly at a 90-degree angle northwest to Finch West station and southeast via a compound curve to Sheppard West station.

The station is located in a low-density district; however, the TTC expects mixed-use development on nearby land. The GO train connection is also expected to boost ridership.

The station building is constructed of glass, stone, and aluminum blend and has a green roof. It is designed to allow sunlight to reach the subway platform. The artwork Spin by Canadian artist Panya Clark Espinal spans the interior's walls, floors, and ceilings. Clark Espinal also created the artwork for Bayview station. The floor of the station at the platform level is constructed using striped terrazzo.

Architecture firm Aedas was commissioned to design the station; their initial plan provides twinned entrances on opposite sides of the rail corridor, each with green roofs that resemble landing strips or wings.

== GO platform ==
The GO Transit commuter rail portion of the station is at the surface on a north–south axis, perpendicular to the subway line. As of February 2026, there is only one platform, but a second will open after the ongoing construction to double-track the Barrie line is completed. The existing platform is located on the far side of the track at a separate station building accessed via the concourse, but the future second platform will be connected to the main entrance building.

The nearby York University GO Station faced reduced service upon Downsview Park's opening, with only peak-hour trains stopping there. In 2020, York University GO Station temporarily suspended operations due to the COVID-19 pandemic. The following year, the closure was confirmed to be permanent because of low ridership.

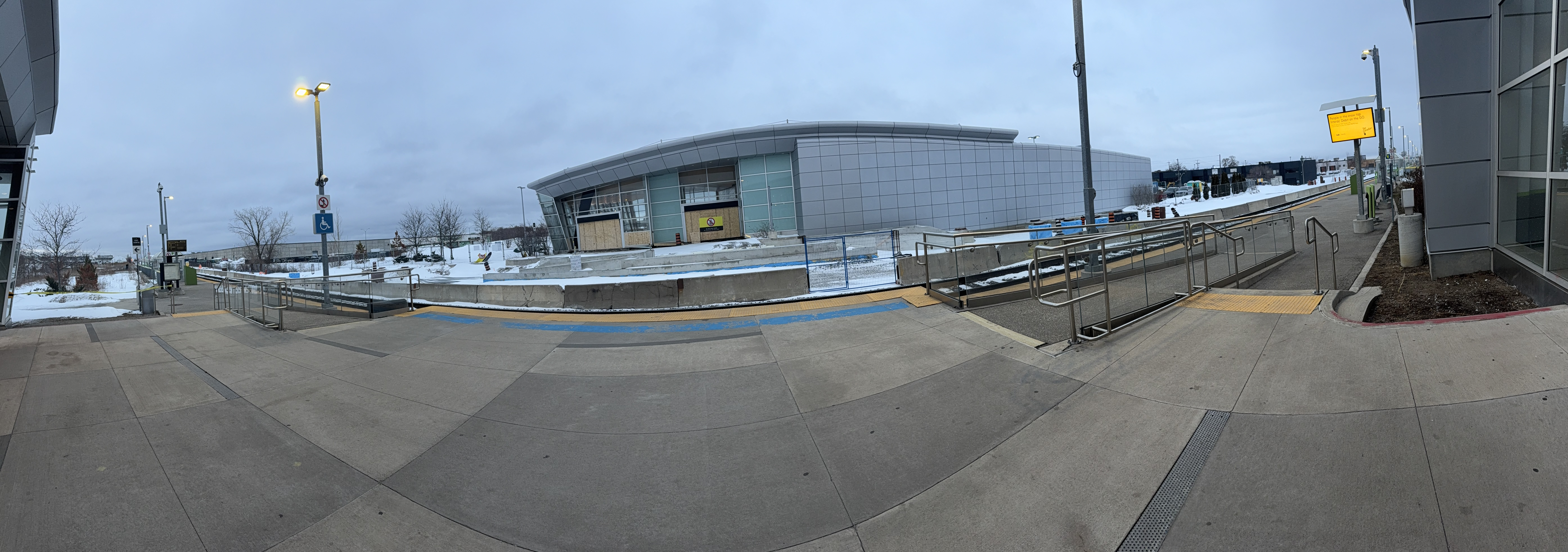
Downsview Park GO second platform under construction in February 2026

== Nearby landmarks ==
Nearby landmarks include Downsview Park, a National Urban Park, which played host to World Youth Day in 2002 and the SARSstock concert in 2003. The Park was the site of an airstrip used by aircraft manufacturer Bombardier Aerospace and formerly used as Canadian Forces Base Downsview. In 2025, Rogers Stadium opened atop the former runway and hosts concerts and other outdoor events. During the first summer season in 2025, TTC and GO Transit services were free for concertgoers after concerts. Other points of interest include the Chesswood hockey arenas, Toronto FC's BMO training ground, Scotiabank Pond Hockey Arena, and "the Hangar" sports facility, as well as industrial lands north of Sheppard.

== Surface connections ==
A transfer is required to connect between the subway and surface bus routes, as there is no attached bus terminal and connections are made on-street, outside the station. Buses stop on Sheppard Avenue and Vitti Street, about 140 metres from the west station building entrance.

Route	Name	Additional information
84A/C/D	Sheppard West	Eastbound to Sheppard–Yonge station
84A	Sheppard West	Westbound to Weston Road
84C	Sheppard West	Westbound to Steeles Avenue West via Arrow Road (Rush hour service)
84D	Sheppard West	Westbound to Pioneer Village station via Oakdale Road (Rush hour service)
101A	Downsview Park	Northbound to Finch West station and southbound to Stanley Greene Boulevard
101B	Downsview Park	Northbound to Finch West station and southbound to Wilson station via Stanley Greene Boulevard (Rush hour service)
106	Sentinel	Eastbound to Sheppard West station and westbound to Pioneer Village station
108A/B	Driftwood	Eastbound to Sheppard West station
108A	Driftwood	Westbound to Pioneer Village station via Grandravine Drive
108B	Driftwood	Westbound to Pioneer Village station via Arleta Avenue
984A	Sheppard West Express	Eastbound to Sheppard–Yonge station and westbound to Weston Road (Rush hour service)
384	Sheppard West	Blue Night service; westbound to Weston Road and eastbound to Sheppard–Yonge station.
