= Panya Clark Espinal =

Canadian artist

Panya Clark Espinal RCA (born 1965) is a Canadian sculptor. Clark Espinal is known for both her gallery and public artworks.

== Education ==
Clark Espinal graduated from Ontario College of Art in 1988. She completed her MFA in Criticism & Curatorial Practice at OCADU in 2019 and was awarded a graduate medal for her thesis project Between Stories: The Agency of Story and Living Ways at the 104th annual GradEx graduate exhibition.

== Public art ==
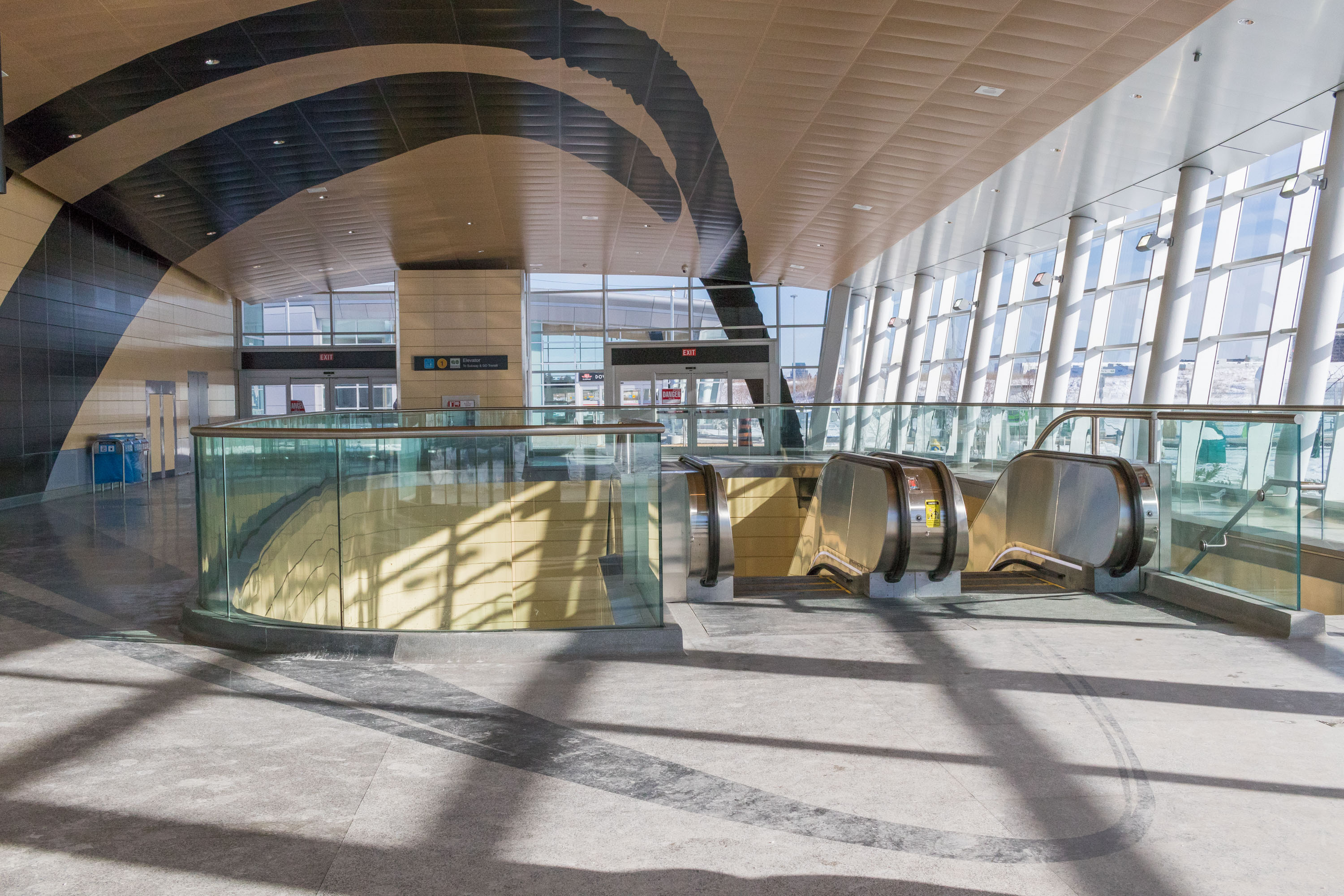
Spin by Panya Clark Espinal at the Downsview Park subway station, Toronto.

Her public work From Here Right Now is permanently installed in Toronto's Bayview subway station. Her work Spin is permanently installed in Toronto's Downsview Park subway station.

== Collections ==
Her work is included in the collections of the National Gallery of Canada and Museum London in London, Ontario.
