= Argo Transit =

On-demand public transit service serving different cities in Ontario

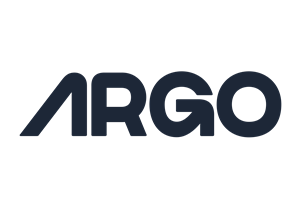

Overview
- Area served: Brampton, Bradford West Gwillimbury, Caledon
- Transit type: On-demand transit
- Chief executive: Praveen Arichandran
- Website: rideargo.com

Argo Transit, stylized as ARGO, is a Canadian on-demand public transit service operating in Brampton, Bradford West Gwillimbury, and Caledon, Ontario, Canada.

Argo Transit's fleet consists of fully electric Argo X1 buses equipped with PRESTO fare collection devices through an agreement with Metrolinx, Ontario's regional transportation authority. This integration allows passengers to use a single fare across multiple GTA transit systems.

== See also ==
- Brampton Transit
- BWG Transit
- Transport in Ontario
