= BWG Transit =

- Commenced operation: 1 May 2014
- Locale: Simcoe County
- Service area: Bradford West Gwillimbury, Ontario
- Service type: On-demand transit
- Stations: Bradford GO Station
- Fleet: Karsan Argo X1
- Annual ridership: >120,000 rides (2025)
- Fuel type: Electric
- Operator: Argo Transit (2025–present); Former: Switzer-Carty Transportation (2014–2025)
- Website: www.townofbwg.com/transit

BWG Transit is a public transit service managed by the town of Bradford West Gwillimbury in Simcoe County, Ontario, Canada. It is operated by Argo Transit. It functions as the local and lowest tier of public transit in the area, and connects to higher-order transit in the form of Simcoe County LINX, the county's regional inter-community bus service, as well as GO Transit train and bus service at the Bradford GO Station.

== History ==
BWG Transit service began on 1 May 2014.

Annual boarding's in the first year of service was 19,009. For the second year (2015–2016), this had only slightly increased, to 19,291. By the third year of service (2016–2017), however, boarding's had jumped sharply to 24,409, and increased significantly again to 27,888 in 2017–2018.

The town of Bradford West Gwillimbury received $76,387 in funding in 2017 from the federal Public Transit Infrastructure Funding program, which supported the purchase of a new bus.

In late 2017, transit planners conducted a public consultation process regarding the expansion of service. The most requested service improvements were (in order from most to least): the introduction of Saturday service, introduction of weekday evening service, introduction of Sunday service, a new connection to Newmarket, a third local bus route, and a connection to Barrie. A shuttle was also proposed to service the Reagens industrial area.

Following this process, planners recommended introduction of Saturday daytime (9am to 5pm) and weekday evening (5pm to 7pm) service, a pilot Newmarket connection, and the Reagens industrial shuttle. On 4 September 2018, Bradford West Gwillimbury Town Council voted for a transit funding increase of $192,200 to pay for these improvements, but rejected the $40,000 Newmarket pilot, which would have connected the Bradford GO Station with the Newmarket Bus Terminal, allowing BWG Transit riders to connect to YRT and Viva buses and enhancing east–west mobility within the region. Town councilors criticized the potential for the plan to encourage out-of-town shopping, such as at the Upper Canada Mall. As an alternative, Mayor Rob Keffer suggested that a cross-jurisdiction route would be best achieved through the upper-tier governments of Simcoe County and York Region and their respective transit services, rather than the town's local BWG Transit.

== Fares ==
BWG Transit uses a flat $3 cash fare for adults, while children under 5 ride for free. Riders can also purchase a reloadable electronic fare card, easyPASS, for $2. easyPASS fares are $1, with children under the age of 5 riding for free. The system uses 90-minute transfers, which are available as a paper slip for riders who pay the cash fare, or which are stored on the easyPASS card for easyPASS riders.

== Routes ==
BWG Transit previously featured two routes until 2025, the 1 Crosstown and 2 Around-Town, which were both operated under contract by Switzer-Carty Transportation. Route 2 Around-Town was further broken down into routes 2A (clockwise) and 2B (counter-clockwise), which ran along roughly the same path in an opposing fashion. Route 2B (Around-Town: Counter-clockwise) did not operate on Saturdays, and the fixed-route system did not operate on Sundays. All other routes operated on a Monday–Friday schedule, with a reduced Saturday schedule.
