= Rutherford GO Station =

Train station in Vaughan, Ontario

Rutherford
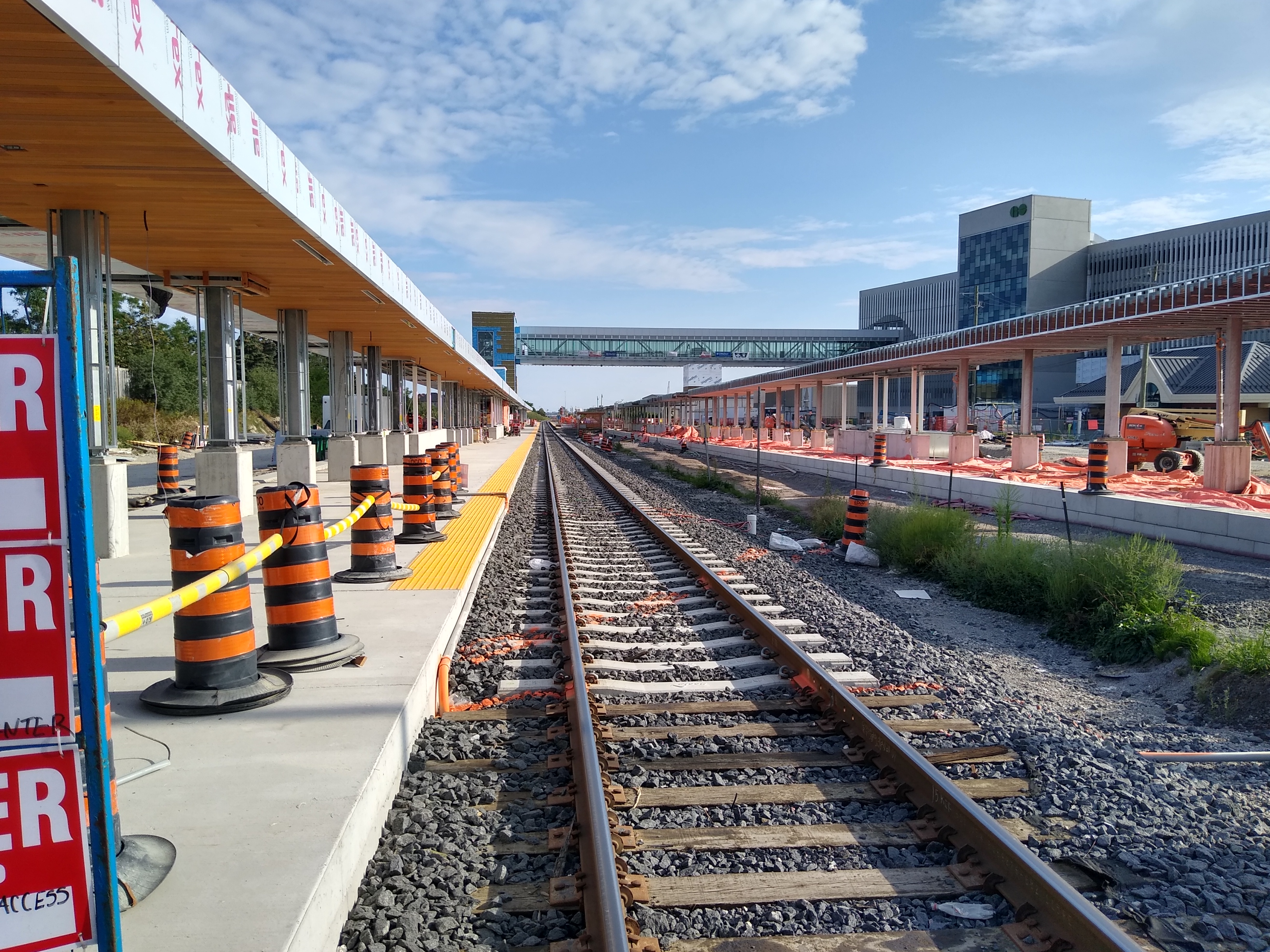
- Station platform under construction in 2021

General information
- Location: 699 Westburne Drive; Vaughan, Ontario; Canada
- Coordinates: 43°50′18.3″N 79°29′53.7″W
- Owner: Metrolinx
- Platforms: 2 side platform (train); 9 (bus)
- Tracks: 2
- Bus routes: 65
- Connections: York Region Transit

Construction
- Structure type: Brick station building
- Parking: 2,200
- Cycle facilities: 100
- Accessible: Yes

Other information
- Station code: GO Transit: RU
- Fare zone: 61

History
- Opened: January 7, 2001; 25 years ago
- Rebuilt: 2022

Passengers
- 2019: 1,300

Services
Preceding station	GO Transit	Following station
Maple towards Allandale Waterfront	Barrie	Downsview Park towards Union
Location

Rutherford GO Station is a train and bus station in the GO Transit network located in Vaughan, Ontario, Canada. It is a stop on the Barrie line train service. This station was opened in January 2001 to accommodate the growing ridership on the line. It went through a redevelopment project which was completed in 2023.

== History ==
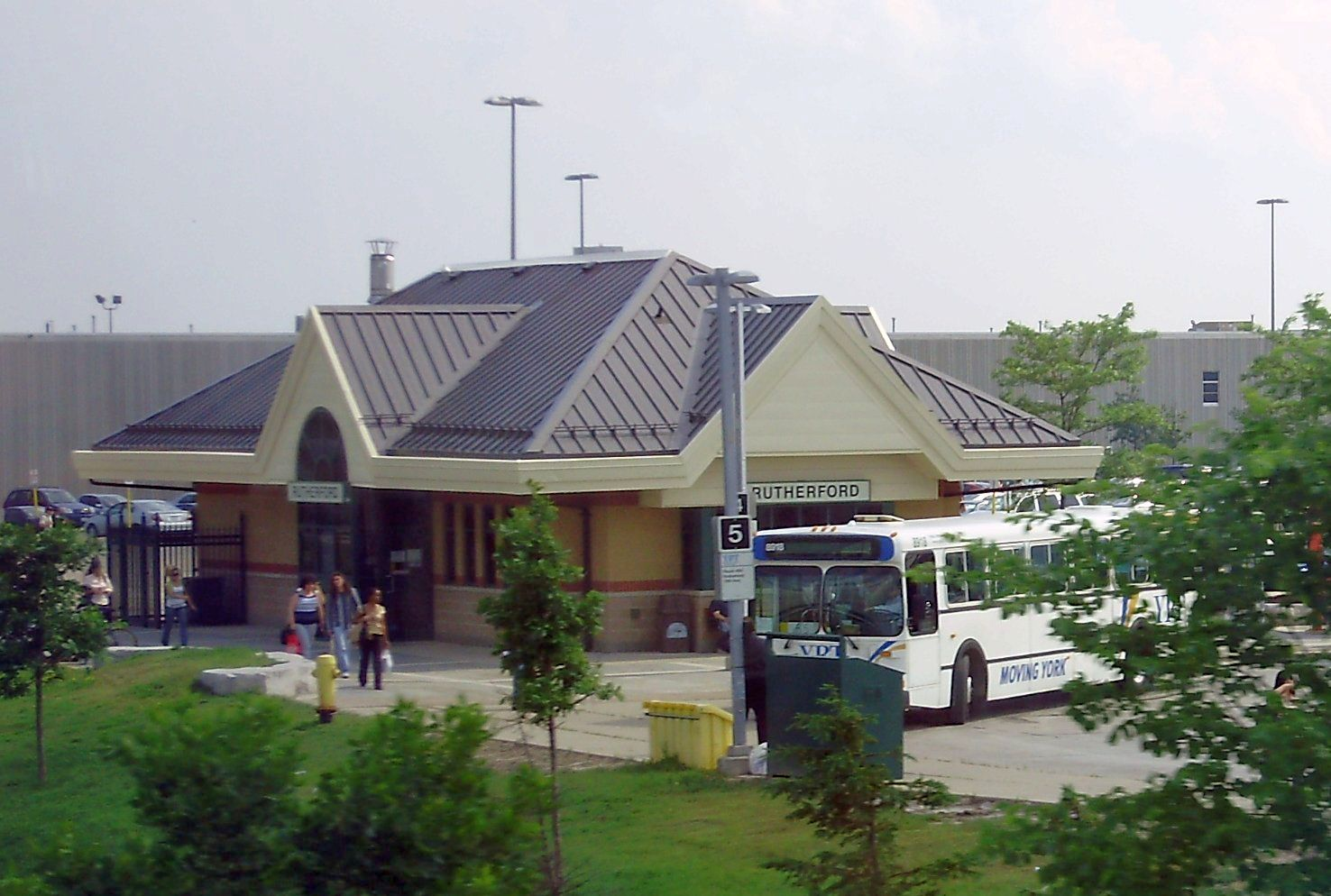
First station built 2001 demolished 2022

This station was opened in January 2001 to accommodate the growing ridership on the Barrie line along with the growing communities surrounding Rutherford GO Station. Another reason for the station's presence was due to Maple GO Station's parking congestion prior to Rutherford's opening.

In May 2017, Metrolinx issued a request for qualification (RFQ) for the redevelopment of the station. In November 2017 Infrastructure Ontario issued a request for proposal from EllisDon Infrastructure Transit, Link Rutherford Station, and Steelhead, the three candidates shortlisted from the RFQ process, for the design, construction, and maintenance of the site. In December 2018, the contract for the project was awarded to EllisDon Infrastructure Transit and it was announced that construction on the project would start in spring 2019 and finish in 2023. The project included the following features:

- New station building to include customer washrooms and digital displays.
- New second rail track.
- New rail platforms with a full canopy
- New multi-level parking structure integrated with the station giving the station approximately 1,200 additional spaces.
- 100 new bicycle parking spots within the new parking structure.
- New railway bridge over Rutherford Road to provide a grade separation.
- Bicycle lanes and a pedestrian bridge.
- Upgraded bus loop for GO Transit and York Region Transit buses.
- Upgraded passenger pick up drop off area.

The new accessible station building opened in December 2021, and the previous station building was demolished in February 2022. In March 2022, the multi-level parking structure opened.

== Services ==
As of January 2018, train service operates approximately every 15–30 minutes in the morning peak period, every 30 minutes in the afternoon peak period and every hour at other times. Outside of peak periods, most trains terminate at Aurora with connecting buses for stations further north.

=== Connecting services ===
This station is served by 2 York Region Transit (YRT) bus routes:

- Route 85 - Rutherford
- Route 107B - Keele

On weekends and holidays, service operates approximately hourly between Aurora and Toronto. Three daily trains in each direction cover the full route from Barrie to Toronto, while the remainder have bus connections at Aurora station for stations further north.
