= Bradford GO Station =

Train station in Bradford, Ontario

Bradford
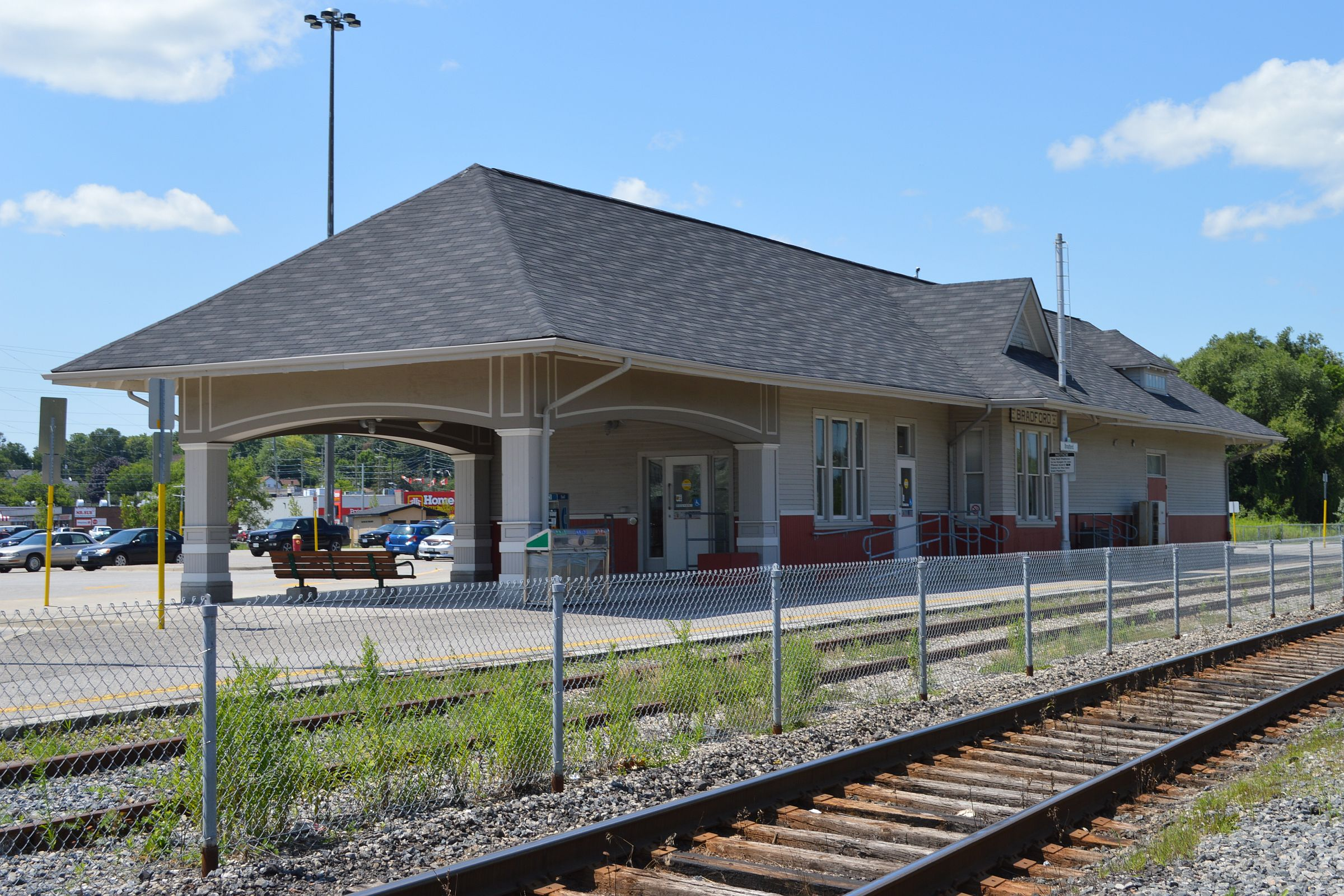
- Station building in 2013

General information
- Location: 300 Holland Street East; Bradford, Ontario; Canada
- Coordinates: 44°06′59.6″N 79°33′19″W
- Owner: Metrolinx
- Platforms: 2 side platforms
- Tracks: 2
- Bus routes: 68
- Bus stands: 1
- Connections: BWG Transit; Simcoe County LINX

Construction
- Parking: 355 spaces
- Cycle facilities: Yes
- Accessible: Yes

Other information
- Station code: GO Transit: BD
- Fare zone: 65

History
- Opened: 1900; 126 years ago

Services
Preceding station	GO Transit	Following station
Barrie South towards Allandale Waterfront	Barrie	East Gwillimbury towards Union
Former services
Preceding station	Canadian National Railway	Following station
Gilford toward North Bay	North Bay – Toronto	Holland Landing toward Toronto
Location

Bradford GO Station is a railway station and bus station in the GO Transit network located in Bradford, Ontario in Canada. It is 67 km north of Union Station in downtown Toronto, and was the terminus of the Bradford line before it was extended to Barrie and renamed the Barrie line on December 17, 2007.

== History ==
Bradford has had railway service since 1853, when the Ontario, Simcoe and Huron Railway was extended there from Machell's Corners (now known as Aurora). This would evolve into the Northern Railway of Canada, which was later acquired by the Grand Trunk Railway. It eventually became a part of the Canadian National Railway system in 1923.

In 1972, a Barrie commuter service to Toronto was established by CN Rail at the request of the Canadian Transportation Commission, which passed through Bradford. When CN Rail's passenger operations were transferred to the newly-formed Via Rail in 1978, the Barrie commuter line became a Via operation. This would be short-lived, however, as federal government budget cuts in 1981 eliminated 20% of Via Rail's network, including a number of commuter lines around Toronto, such as the Barrie line. After a significant public pressure campaign from transit activists and local municipalities along the line, the service was preserved and transferred from Via Rail to GO Transit. GO train service began on 7 September 1982, with Bradford as the terminal station, with GO bus service connecting riders from Barrie to Bradford. Initial service was a single weekday round trip.

From 1990 to 1993, Barrie succeeded Bradford as the terminal station on the line, before Ontario provincial government cuts caused the service to Barrie to end, with Bradford becoming the terminal station once again. Throughout the following years, train frequency along the line was gradually increased, with two trains a day starting in 1998. In 2007, service was finally extended north of Bradford once again, with Metrolinx's purchase of the CN Newmarket Subdivision. By the summer of 2012, five trains were running every weekday, and weekend and holiday train service was introduced for the summer.

In December 2018, the Town of Bradford West Gwillimbury voted to sell a vacant parcel of land north of the station to Metrolinx so that additional station parking could be constructed.

In January 2022, Metrolinx started to make improvements at the station to prepare for two-way, all-day service on the Barrie Line. Work includes an expanded bus loop with 3 new bays, a new heated waiting shelter, expanded parking, a new pick-up, drop-off area, a new CCTV system for security, improved electrical installations and a new underground storage tank for stormwater. By 2025, all station upgrades had been completed.

== Services ==
Bradford station has weekday train service consisting of 10 trains southbound to Union Station in the morning, 9 trains returning northbound in the afternoon and evening, and one train returning northbound at midnight. At other times, the station is served by GO bus route 68 which operates hourly between Barrie Allandale Transit Terminal and Aurora GO Station, where passengers can transfer to the all-day train service to Toronto.

Weekend train service consists of 5 daily round trips between Barrie and Toronto. At other times, GO bus route 68 connects the station to Aurora GO station where passengers can transfer to the hourly weekend train service toward Toronto.
