= Aurora GO Station =

Train station in Aurora, Ontario

Aurora
- Station building and platform in 2018

General information
- Location: 121 Wellington Street East; Aurora, Ontario; Canada
- Coordinates: 44°00′02″N 79°27′35″W
- Owner: Metrolinx
- Platforms: 1 side platform
- Tracks: 1
- Bus routes: 65 68
- Connections: York Region Transit

Construction
- Structure type: Heritage wood frame station building
- Parking: 1725 spaces
- Cycle facilities: Yes
- Accessible: Yes

Other information
- Station code: GO Transit: AU
- Fare zone: 63

History
- Opened: 1853; 173 years ago (OS&H)
- Rebuilt: 1900 (GTR); 1982 (GOT)

Services
Preceding station	GO Transit	Following station
Newmarket towards Allandale Waterfront	Barrie	King City towards Union
Former services
Preceding station	Canadian National Railway	Following station
Newmarket toward North Bay	North Bay – Toronto	King toward Toronto

Heritage Railway Station (Canada)
- Designated: 1990
- Reference no.: 6500
Location

Aurora GO Station is a railway station and bus station in the GO Transit network located on Wellington Street East between Yonge Street and Bayview Avenue in Aurora, Ontario, Canada. It is a stop on the Barrie line train service, and connects with York Region Transit local bus routes, and the GO Express Bus between Newmarket Bus Terminal and Union Station Bus Terminal.

== History ==
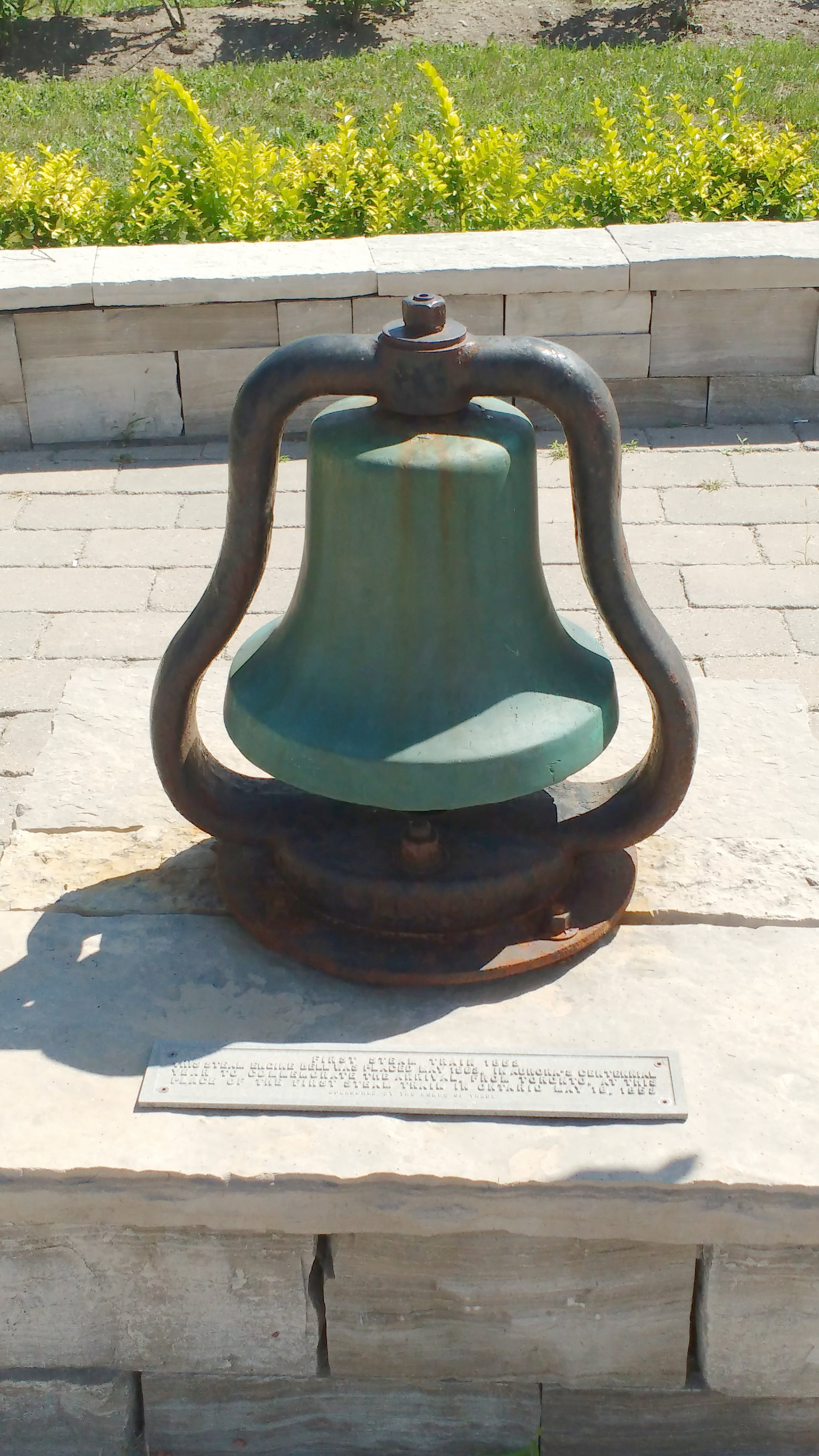
Commemorative locomotive bell at the station.

Aurora station opened on 16 May 1853, when steam train service began between Toronto and Machell's Corners, as Aurora was then known, on the Ontario, Simcoe and Huron Railway. The first train was led by the Toronto, the first locomotive built in Canada, completed at the James Good foundry Toronto Locomotive Works on 16 April 1853. The train consist included two boxcars carrying freight, one passenger coach car, and one mixed passenger and baggage car. This first voyage is commemorated by a plaque installed in 1953 at Union Station in Toronto, as well as a steam locomotive bell placed first at Centennial Park in May 1963, which has since been relocated to Aurora station. There is also a plaque placed in a small parkette at the station by the Board of Trade and another placed by the Province of Ontario to remember the event.

The train's arrival at the Wellington Street train station was greeted with cheers from nearly all residents of the community, who had assembled at the station, and the event was celebrated with a fireworks display. Connection to the railway led to prosperity for Aurora, with the development of two hotels, a wagon maker, a brewery, and other businesses. In 1855 the line was completed to Collingwood.

In 1900, Grand Trunk Railway constructed the present building to a standard plan design with a porte-cochère and low profile. The building was designated a provincial heritage building in 1971 and a federal heritage railway station in 1990.

The station building was renovated after GO Transit became the exclusive passenger carrier in 1992.

On August 21, 2012, GO Transit opened a new bus loop to accommodate all GO and York Region Transit bus service at the station.

== Services ==
As of January 2018, weekday train service operates approximately every 15–30 minutes in the morning peak period (southbound), every 30 minutes in the afternoon peak period (northbound) and every hour at other times. Outside of peak periods, most trains terminate at Aurora with connecting buses for stations further north.

On weekends and holidays, service operates approximately every hour to and from Union Station, with most trains terminating at Aurora station. Three daily trains in each direction cover the full route from Barrie to Toronto, while the remainder have bus connections at Aurora station for stations further north.

== Connecting York Region Transit buses ==
- 32 Aurora South
- 33 Wellington–Leslie
- 54 Bayview
- Mobility On-Request

== Future ==
Construction of second station track and platform in October 2026

In August 2023, construction began on station improvements to support future all-day, two-way 15-minute service between Union Station and Aurora. The work includes: adding a second through-track with a new platform accessible via pedestrian tunnels, building a new passenger pick-up/drop-off area, adding a new exit at Berczy Street. The work is part of the province's GO Expansion project.

== See also ==
- List of designated heritage railway stations of Canada
