= Allandale Waterfront GO Station =

Train station in Barrie, Ontario

Allandale Waterfront
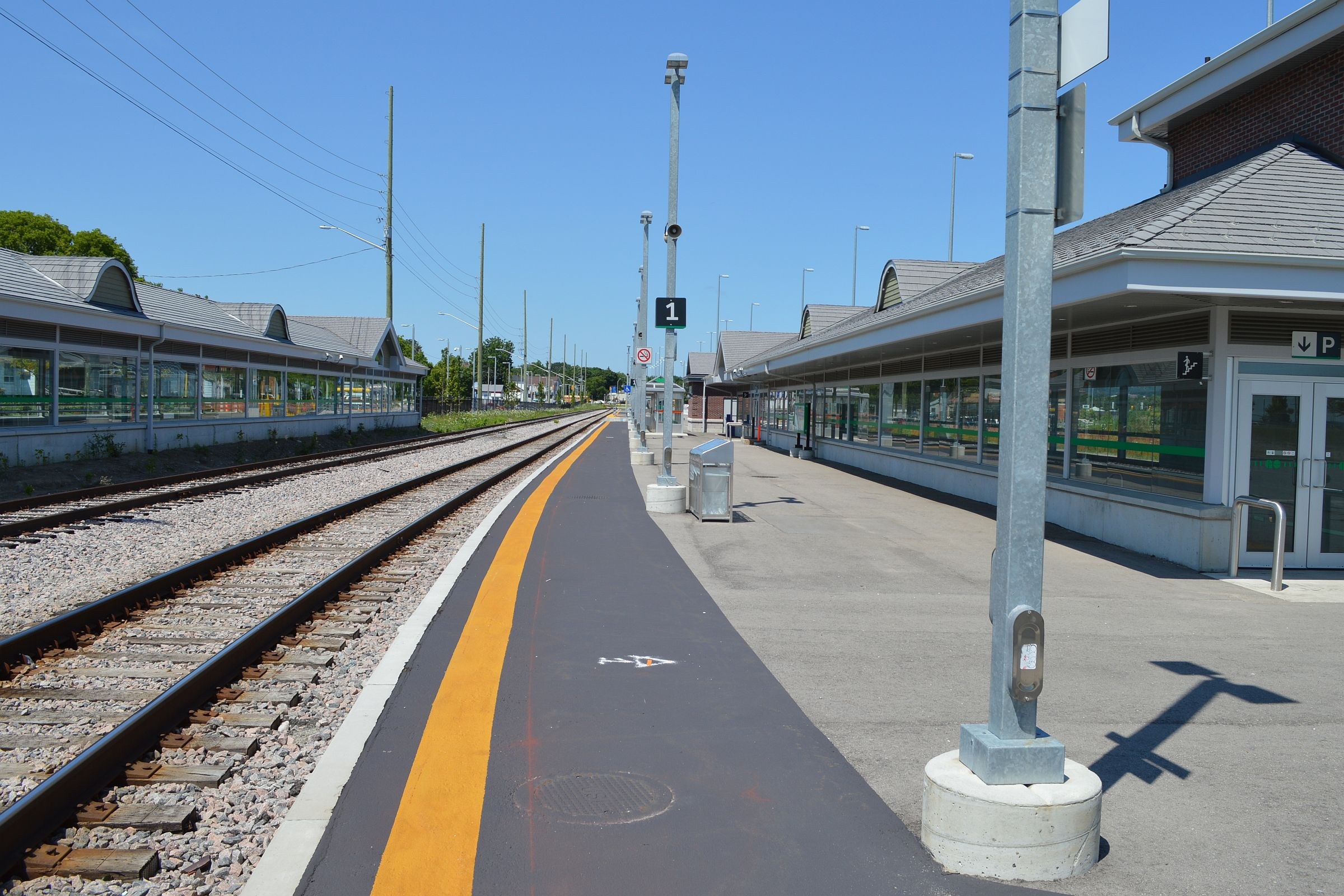
- Allandale Waterfront station, July 2013

General information
- Location: 24 Essa Road; Barrie, Ontario; Canada
- Coordinates: 44°22′27″N 79°41′16″W
- Owner: Metrolinx/City of Barrie
- Platforms: 1 side platform 6 bus bays
- Tracks: 1 + 1 bypass
- Connections: 68 at Barrie Allandale Transit Terminal

Construction
- Parking: 150
- Accessible: Yes

Other information
- Station code: GO Transit: AD
- Fare zone: 69

History
- Opened: 19 June 1905; 121 years ago
- Closed: 1980; 46 years ago (building; reopened 1990-1993); 1996; 30 years ago (platform)
- Rebuilt: 2011; 15 years ago

Services
Preceding station	GO Transit	Following station
Terminus	Barrie	Barrie South towards Union
Former services
Preceding station	Canadian National Railway	Following station
Oro toward North Bay	North Bay – Toronto	Craigvale toward Toronto
Vine (Ontario) toward Hamilton	Hamilton – Allandale	Terminus
Colwell toward Penetang	Penetang – Allandale	Terminus
Colwell toward Meaford	Meaford – Allandale	Terminus
Preceding station	Via Rail	Following station
Washago toward Vancouver	The Canadian (originally operated by CN as the Super Continental)	Newmarket toward Toronto
Preceding station	GO Transit	Following station
Terminus	Barrie (1990–1993)	Bradford towards Union
Preceding station	Ontario Northland Railway	Following station
Washago toward Cochrane	Northlander	Toronto Terminus
Location

Allandale Waterfront GO Station is a train and bus station serving as the northern terminus of GO Transit's Barrie line. The station was built just south of Allandale Station, a historic train station that occupies a large property on the southern shore of Kempenfelt Bay (Lake Simcoe) in the waterfront area of Barrie, Ontario, Canada. The current and former station were built on a burial site of the Huron indigenous peoples.

Construction of the new facility began in 2009. GO Transit announced on 15 June 2011 that the station would open in the autumn of 2011, but construction delayed its opening until January 2012. Bus service to the station began on 28 January 2012, with the train service following two days later. A ceremonial train trip from Allandale Waterfront GO Station to Bradford GO Station officially opened the station on 29 January 2012.

== History ==
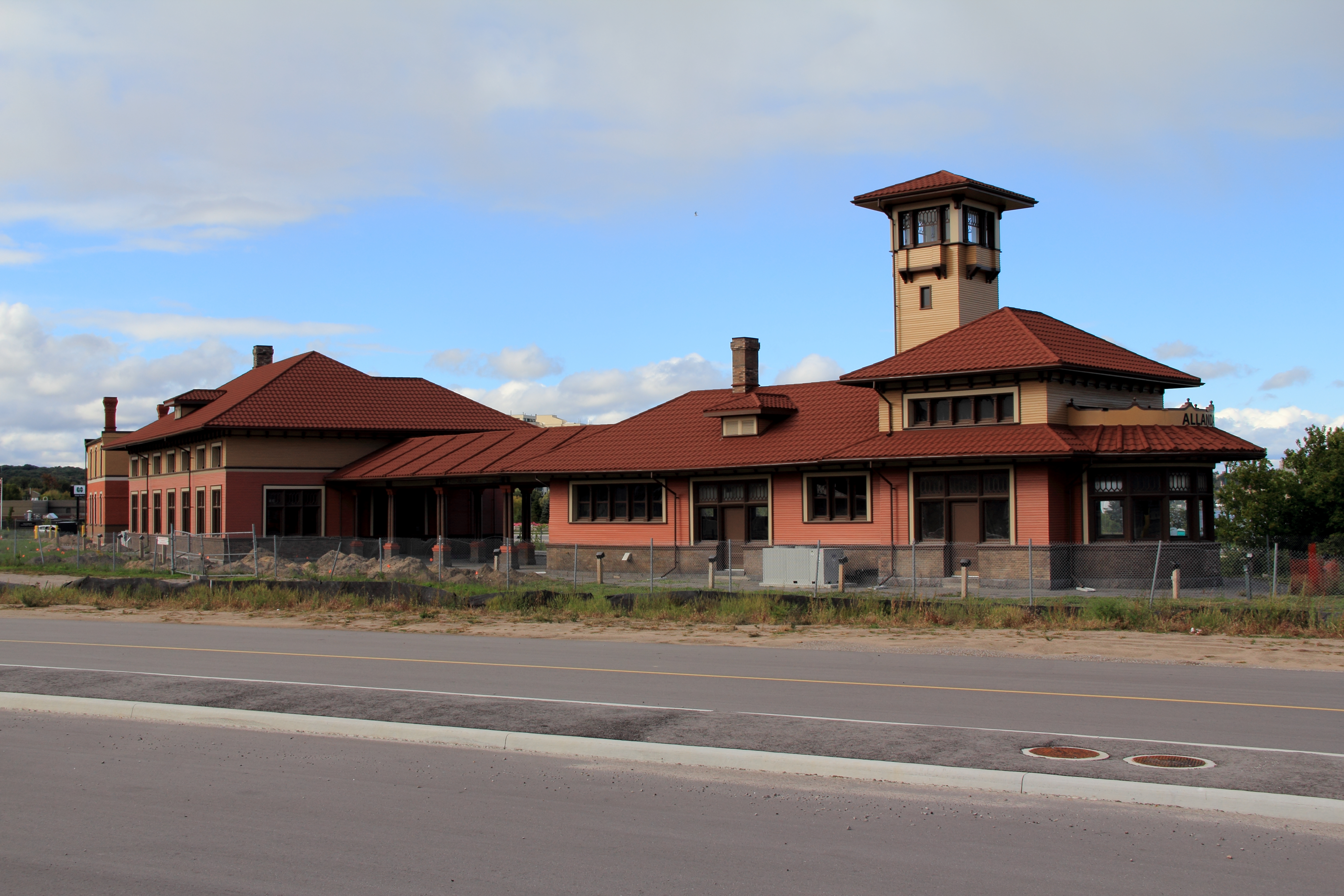
Old Allandale Station undergoing renovations in 2012

The Ontario, Simcoe and Huron Union Railway (OS&HUR) first built a station here in 1853. Four historic stations, the last of which still stands on the site near the present station, was built in 1904 and opened by then-operator Grand Trunk Railway on 19 June 1905. The station was used by Grand Trunk and later Canadian National Railway (both of which had trains branching northwards from here to serve either North Bay or Meaford), Ontario Northland, and Via Rail until closing in 1980. However, Ontario Northlands's Northlander and Via's Canadian continued to stop at the closed station's platform until 1992 and 1996 respectively. In 1990, GO Transit itself reopened it during its first attempt to extend service into Barrie (running one rush hour train per direction), but terminated the service in 1993 due to low ridership. In 1992, during this reopening period, the Northlander was rerouted to the Bala Subdivision east of Lake Simcoe, but the Canadian served the platform until September 22, 1996, when it was also rerouted. Shortly thereafter, CN lifted the rails between the junction just to the north of the station to Longford, but the branch to the northwest, the former Meaford Subdivision, was retained as a connector to the shortline Barrie-Collingwood Railway.

=== ACDC ===
The Allandale Community Development Corporation or 'ACDC' (with City interests) purchased the buildings and adjacent 7 acres (28,000 m^{2}) from CNR after train service was discontinued in the 1980s. ACDC then sold the station to CHUM Ltd in 2000.

=== CHUM ownership ===
CHUM Ltd. purchased the 6.9 acres (28,000 m^{2}) of land, including the station buildings, for CA$1,050,000 in 2000. CHUM planned to restore the Allandale Station building as part of their plan to develop of a new broadcast centre on the site for their television station, CKVR, but changed their plan in 2004. In 2007, CHUM agreed to sell the property to the city for the same amount CHUM originally paid. CHUM received a Charitable Donation tax receipt reflecting the increased value of the property since 2000 largely due to the restoration and site works completed by CHUM.

=== Redevelopment ===
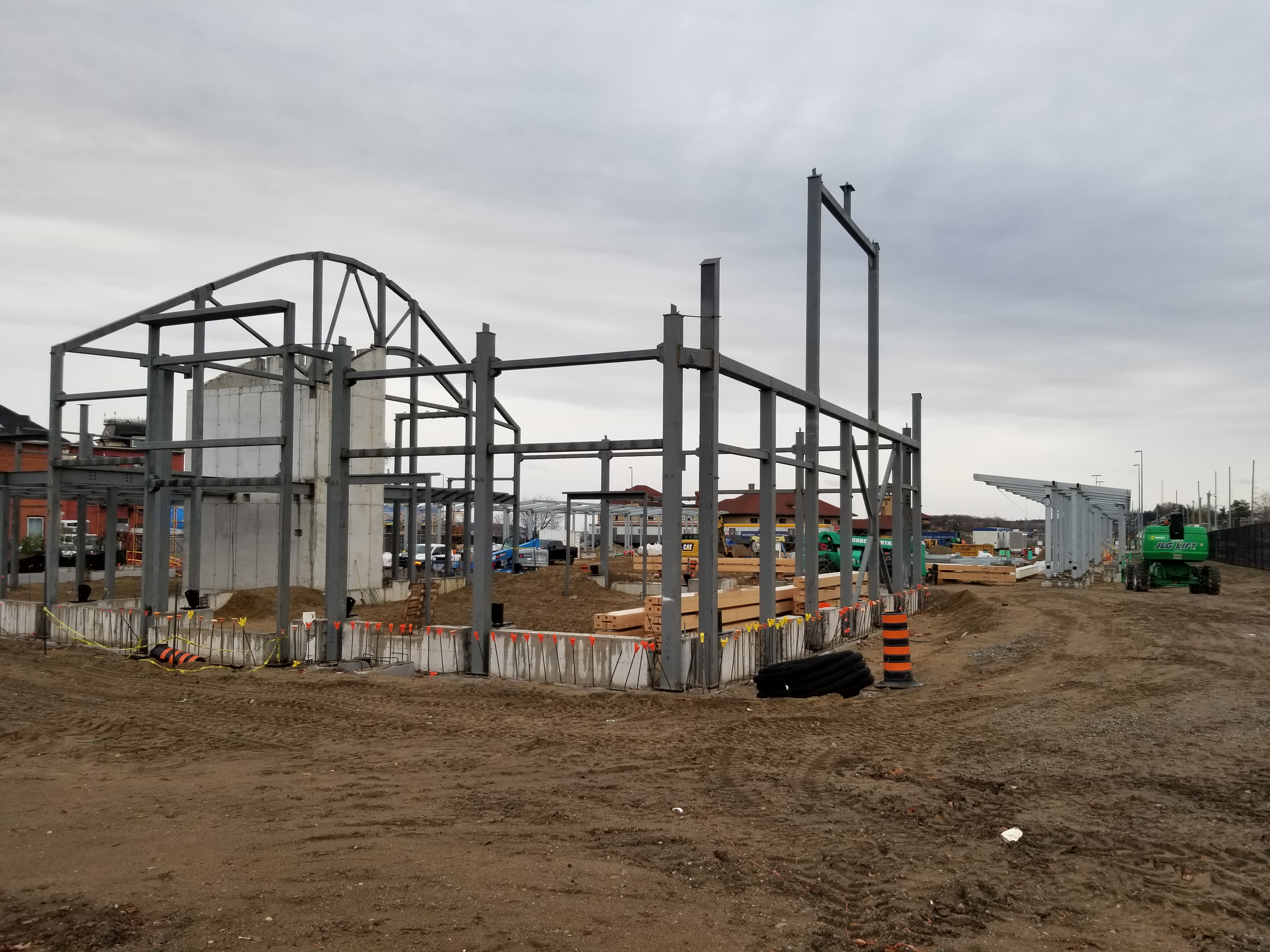
The adjacent Barrie Allandale Transit Terminal under construction in November 2024

Construction of the new Allandale Waterfront GO Station (located adjacent to the historic Allandale Station) broke ground in spring 2010 and the station officially opened on January 28, 2012. Redevelopment of the station cost approximately $5 million.

On May 31, 2024, construction started on a new bus terminal to replace the station's existing terminal which contained only shelters with a new facility containing a building; as well as the downtown Barrie Bus Terminal. The new terminal, named the Barrie Allandale Transit Terminal, opened on September 21, 2025.

== Archaeology ==
The Allandale station site is located on a site used by indigenous peoples. Prior to the original railway construction, a large pit of several hundred indigenous peoples' remains was found. Other ossuaries were found in 1884 and 1889.

It was the subject of an archeological excavation, during which objects were recovered from the Uren substage of the Middle Ontario Iroquoian period. It has been dated to the late 12th to early 13th century and was used as a fishing station by the Wendat people. It is the only documented fishing station from the Uren period, and one of few sites of that period to have been discovered.

The site is regarded by archeologists as a temporary location "for exploitation of local fish resources". Numerous fish remains were found in the site's midden, but no longhouses were found there.

Analysis of the fish remains indicates that various species were caught for consumption at this site. These include species in the family Catostomidae (110 white sucker, 23 longnose sucker, and 103 specimens from other genus Catostomus species), family Percidae (34 yellow perch and 1 walleye), as well as 12 Ictaluridae, 14 largemouth bass and 4 smallmouth bass, 5 Centrarchidae, and specimens from several other species.

In 2011, human bone fragment remains were discovered underneath the crawl space of the original station's office building at the site during an excavation for an archeological site assessment as part of grading work for the new train station. These were later determined to have been in the fill used as backfill for the foundation, but were of indeterminate origin. An incisor found amongst those remains was interpreted to be part of the Uren archeological material, but data are insufficient to ascertain its ultimate origin.

The Wendat people consider the site to be a disturbed site of indigenous remains which could be an ossuary. The original train station and yard's construction disturbed the remains and the new station disturbed them further without proper archaeological study. Further, the construction of the GO station did not follow Government of Ontario heritage regulations, which prohibited the disturbance of human remains at a known site.

== Heritage station buildings ==
The station buildings comprise a federally designated heritage railway station protected by the Heritage Railway Stations Protection Act. The Italianate structures are near the southwest shore of Kempenfeldt Bay, separated from it by a public park. The station complex was originally adjacent to the bay until the land behind the station was infilled and levelled to build a rail yard.

The station complex consists of a station building, an office building, and a restaurant adjacent to each other along the rail line. They have a uniform roof pitch, and form an atypical layout for a railway station. The low-pitched roof and deep overhanging eaves are indicative of Prairie School design influence. Two of the buildings were designed by the Detroit firm Spier & Rohns and built in 1904 by Richard Scruton. The station opened in 1905.

The interior and exterior features of the buildings are provincially protected under an Ontario Heritage Trust conservation easement. The station building was considered the "flagship of the Grand Trunk" upon its opening.

== Services ==
Allandale Waterfront station has a weekday train service consisting of 7 trains southbound to Union Station in the morning, and 7 trains returning northbound from Union Station in the afternoon. At other times, GO bus route 68 operates hourly to Aurora GO Station where passengers can transfer to the all-day train service to Toronto.

Weekend train service consists of 5 trains in each direction throughout the day. GO bus route 68 also operates hourly to Aurora GO station or East Gwillimbury GO station where passengers can connect to the hourly weekend train service to Toronto.

== Barrie Allandale Transit Terminal ==
Barrie Allandale Transit Terminal
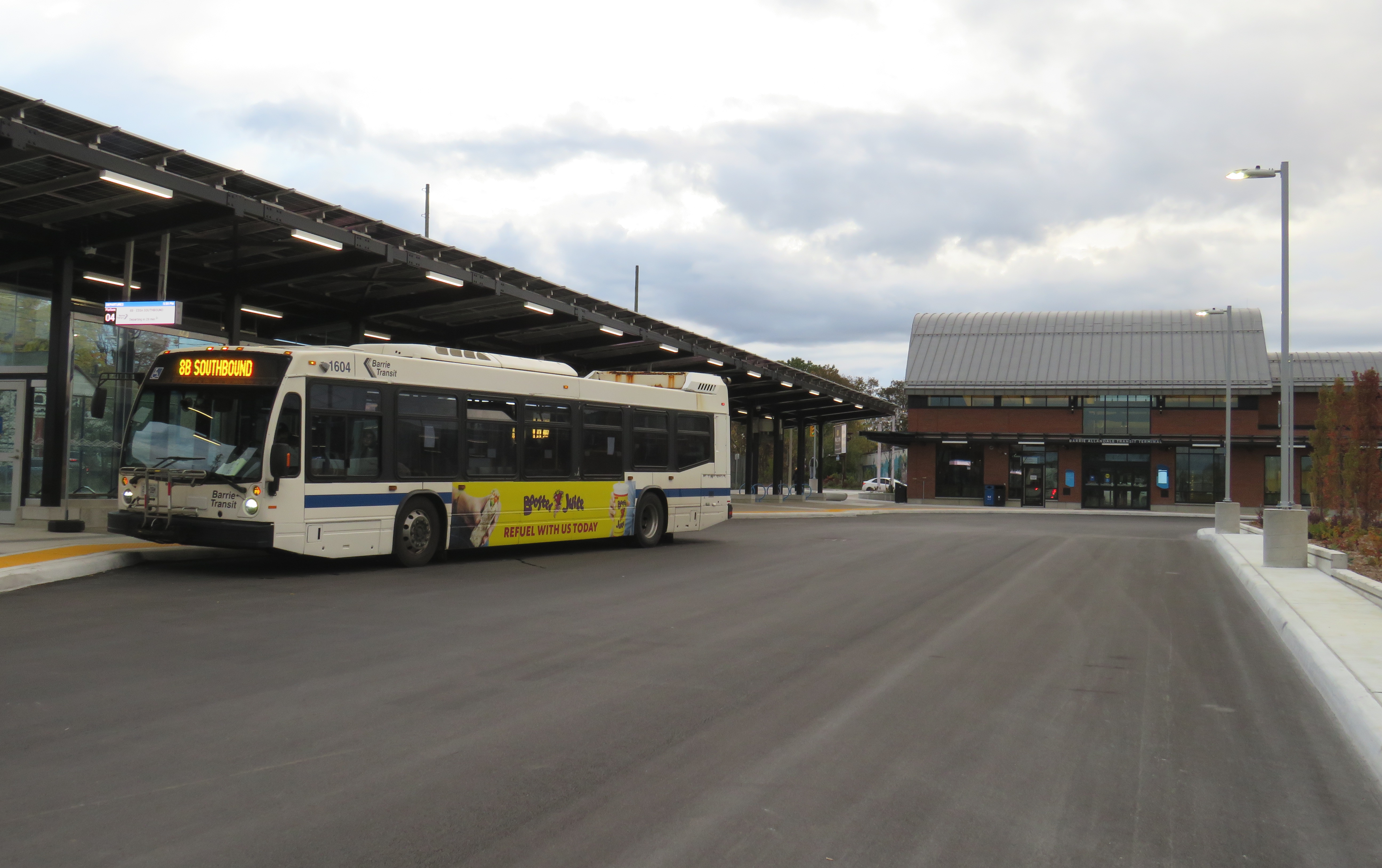

General information
- Location: 20 Essa Rd., Barrie, ON; Canada
- Platforms: 14
- Bus operators: Barrie Transit; GO Transit; Ontario Northland; LINX Transit

Construction
- Cycle facilities: Bicycle rack
- Accessible: Yes

History
- Opened: 2025
Location

Barrie Allandale Transit Terminal is Barrie's main bus station, hosting GO, Barrie Transit, LINX Transit, and Ontario Northland intercity buses. It opened on Sunday, September 21, 2025, replacing the old open-air station terminal and the downtown Barrie Bus Terminal.

Routes serving the terminal:

Platform	Operator	Route
2	LINX Transit	2 Wasaga Beach
3	Barrie Transit	8A Yonge
4	Barrie Transit	8B Essa
5	Barrie Transit	8A Royal Victoria Hospital
6	Barrie Transit	7A Grove; 7B Bear Creek
7	GO Transit	68B East Gwillimbury GO; 68 Aurora GO
8	Ontario Northland	Toronto, North Bay, Sudbury
9	Barrie Transit	Transit On Demand
12 13	Barrie Transit	8B Crosstown; 12A Georgian Mall
14	Barrie Transit	12B Barrie South GO
