= GO Transit rail services =

Commuter rail services provided by GO Transit

GO Rail

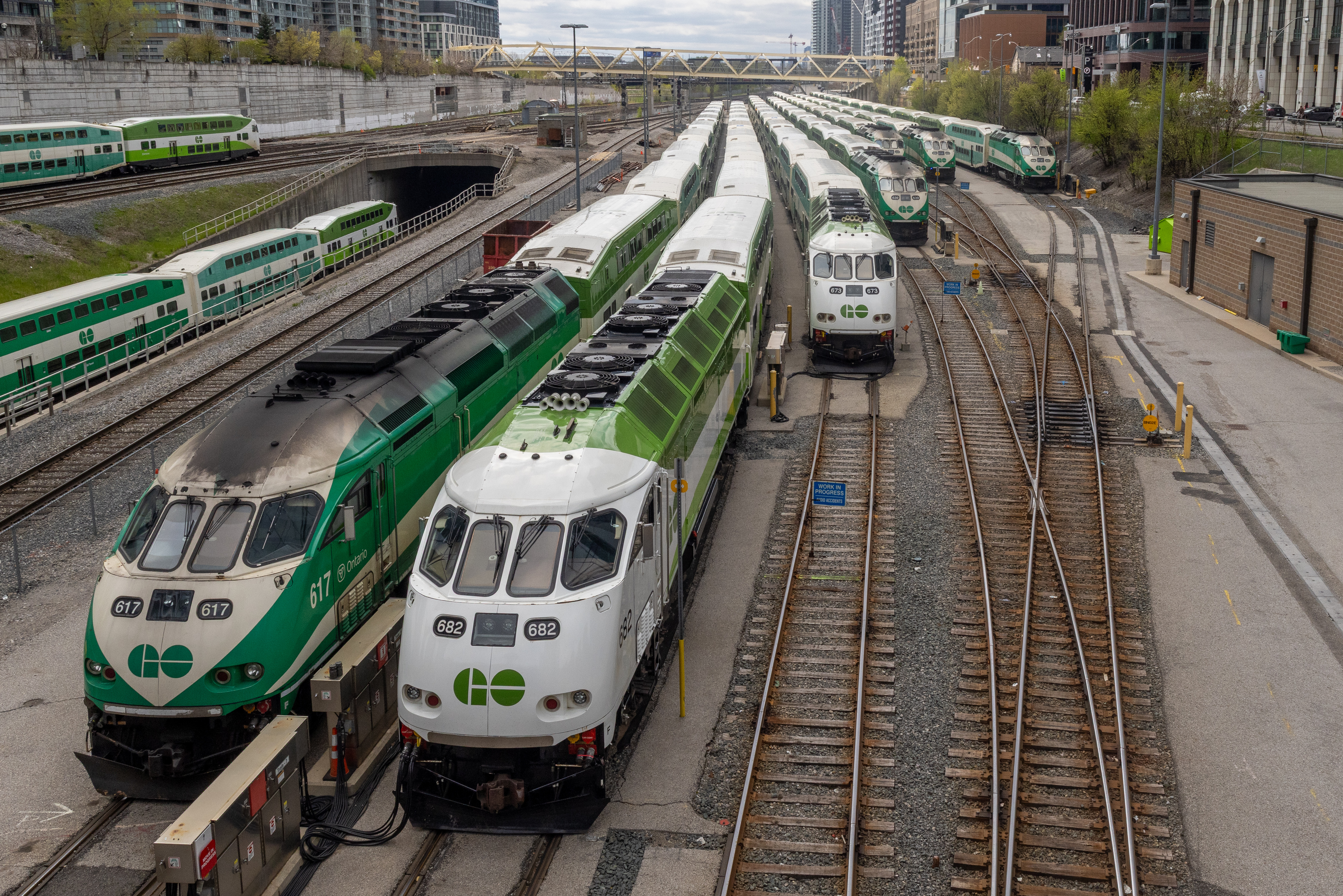
- GO Transit rolling stock at North Bathurst Yard

Overview
- Owner: Metrolinx
- Locale: Greater Golden Horseshoe
- Transit type: Commuter rail, regional rail
- Number of lines: 7
- Line number: Lakeshore West; Lakeshore East; Milton; Kitchener; Barrie; Richmond Hill; Stouffville
- Number of stations: 71
- Daily ridership: 277,100 (weekdays, Q2 2026)
- Annual ridership: 60,760,200 (2025)
- Website: gotransit.com

Operation
- Began operation: May 23, 1967; 59 years ago
- Operator: Alstom
- Reporting marks: GOTX
- Infrastructure managers: CN; CPKC; GOTX
- Number of vehicles: 90 locomotives 979 Bombardier BiLevel Coaches

Technical
- System length: 568.4 kilometres (353 mi)
- Track gauge: 1,435 mm (4 ft 8 1/2 in) standard gauge
System map

The GO Rail system (commonly known as the "GO train") is the passenger rail network of GO Transit in the Greater Toronto and Hamilton Area (GTHA) and Greater Golden Horseshoe. Described as both a commuter rail and regional rail system, it comprises seven lines and 71 stations, converging at Union Station in Toronto. In 2025, the system had a ridership of 60,760,200 passengers per year.

GO Transit started on May 23, 1967, running single-deck trains powered by diesel locomotives in push-pull configuration on a single rail line along Lake Ontario's shoreline. When GO trains began operation, they ran on tracks mostly owned by the two major freight railways of Canada: Canadian National and Canadian Pacific. Over time, GO Transit (and subsequently Metrolinx) have acquired tracks, ensuring GO Transit has control over track maintenance and expansion. Metrolinx currently owns 80% of the GO Rail corridors.

All GO Transit fares are calculated by the fare zones that the origin and destination of the trip are in, as well as by passenger category (adult, student, senior or child). GO Rail fares are not differentiated based whether or not buses are used for part of the trip. The GO Rail fleet consists of 90 MPI MP40 locomotives and 979 Bombardier BiLevel Coaches.

== Lines and stations ==
GO Transit rail lines
Line	ID	Cities served	Termini	Service (from Union Station)	Route variants
Lakeshore West	LW	Toronto Mississauga, Oakville, Burlington, Hamilton, St. Catharines, Niagara Falls	Union Station Aldershot GO, Hamilton GO, West Harbour GO, Niagara Falls station	Two-way all day service to West Harbour Limited two-way service to Niagara	Express
Lakeshore East	LE	Toronto Pickering, Ajax, Whitby, Oshawa	Union Station Oshawa GO	Two-way all day service	
Milton	MI	Toronto Mississauga, Milton	Union Station Milton GO	Rush hour one-way from Milton in morning Rush hour one-way to Milton in afternoon No weekend service No service outside rush hour	
Kitchener	KI	Toronto Brampton, Georgetown, Acton, Guelph, Kitchener, Stratford	Union Station Bramalea GO, Mount Pleasant GO, Kitchener GO, Stratford station	Two-way all day service to Bramalea Limited two-way service to Kitchener Two-way all day service to Mount Pleasant on weekends One daily round trip to Stratford	Express
Barrie	BR	Toronto Vaughan, King City, Aurora, Newmarket, Bradford, Barrie	Union Station Aurora GO, Bradford GO, Allandale Waterfront GO	Rush hour one-way from Barrie in morning Rush hour one-way to Barrie in afternoon Two-way service to Aurora outside rush hour Limited service to Barrie outside rush hour Two-way all-day service to Aurora on weekends Limited service to Barrie on weekends	
Richmond Hill	RH	Toronto Richmond Hill	Union Station Bloomington GO	Rush hour one-way from Bloomington in morning Rush hour one-way to Bloomington in afternoon No weekend service No service outside rush hour	
Stouffville	ST	Toronto Markham, Whitchurch-Stouffville	Union Station Unionville GO, Mount Joy GO, Old Elm GO	Rush hour one-way service from Old Elm in morning Rush hour one-way service to Old Elm in afternoon Two-way all day service to Mount Joy outside rush hour Two-way all day service to Mount Joy during weekends Limited service to Old Elm during weekends	

=== History ===
GO Transit rail service began on May 23, 1967, on a single rail line along Lake Ontario's shoreline. GO train service ran throughout the day from Oakville to Pickering with limited rush hour train service to Hamilton. This line, now divided as the Lakeshore East and Lakeshore West lines is the keystone corridor of GO Transit, and continued to be its only rail line for its first seven years of operation. GO's other five lines were opened between 1974 and 1982, significantly expanding the rail network from 86 to 332 kilometres long, and from 16 to 43 stations.

To that point, all of GO's rail services ran on tracks mostly owned by the two major freight railways of Canada: Canadian National (CN) and Canadian Pacific (CP). in 1988, a small but significant milestone in network growth occurred when it expanded its Lakeshore East line on new track it built by itself. But following that, the network experienced two long-distance extensions to southern Barrie and Guelph in 1990, only to have those extensions reversed three years later. GO did extend its Lakeshore East line again in 1995 from Whitby to Oshawa, finishing that line as it exists today.

The reach of GO's network remained relatively unchanged between 1996 and 2005. However, seven new infill stations were opened along the Bradford and Stouffville lines. This coincided with GO's initial purchases of the rail corridors it operated on, taking ownership of the entire Stouffville line past Scarborough station, and most of the Barrie line north of the Toronto border. In addition, GO took control of the critical Union Station Rail Corridor, which all GO trains on all lines used. By the end of 2005, GO owned over a third of its rail network.

From 2007 to 2017, GO's network saw six extensions, requiring the Bradford line to be renamed as the "Barrie line", and the Georgetown line to "Kitchener line." These long-distance extensions, along with the other extensions on the Lakeshore West, Richmond Hill and Stouffville lines, expanded GO's network length by 29%. Six critical corridor purchases were also made, tripling its length of owned corridors and bringing its ownership percentage to over 80%. Finally, 10 new stations were added, one of which coincided with the opening of the Toronto–York Spadina subway extension, creating a new interchange between GO and the TTC subway.

In 2019, Lakeshore West service was extended from Hamilton to Niagara Falls. This was the first major expansion of the GO network since service to Kitchener began in 2011. In 2021, a two-year pilot project extended the Kitchener line to London however this did not continue past 2023. In November 2025, the 70th GO station opened at Mount Dennis, which created another transfer to the Toronto subway.

GO Transit rail history
Corridor	Colors	Date	Stations	Length	Track ownership		Note
Lakeshore (unified West and East)		1967-05-23	16	86.4 kilometres (53.7 mi)	0 kilometres (0.0 mi)	0%	Initial service.
Lakeshore (unified West and East)		1968-04-26	15	86.4 kilometres (53.7 mi)	0 kilometres (0.0 mi)	0%	Lorne Park station closed.
Lakeshore (unified West and East)		1968-11-09	16	86.4 kilometres (53.7 mi)	0 kilometres (0.0 mi)	0%	Exhibition opened.
Georgetown		1974-04-29	22	134.4 kilometres (83.5 mi)	0 kilometres (0.0 mi)	0%	New line opened.
Georgetown		1974-12-01	23	134.4 kilometres (83.5 mi)	0 kilometres (0.0 mi)	0%	Etobicoke North opened.
Richmond Hill		1978-05-01	27	168.6 kilometres (104.8 mi)	0 kilometres (0.0 mi)	0%	New line opened.
Milton		1981-10-26	34	219.0 kilometres (136.1 mi)	0 kilometres (0.0 mi)	0%	New line opened.
Bradford; Stouffville		1982-09-07	44	332.0 kilometres (206.3 mi)	0 kilometres (0.0 mi)	0%	New lines opened.
Lakeshore West		1988-09-19	45	332.0 kilometres (206.3 mi)	0 kilometres (0.0 mi)	0%	Appleby opened.
Lakeshore East		1988-12-04	47	346.3 kilometres (215.2 mi)	14.3 kilometres (8.9 mi)	4.1%	Service extended to Whitby over newly-constructed GO subdivision.
Bradford		1990-09-17	48	375.1 kilometres (233.1 mi)	14.3 kilometres (8.9 mi)	3.8%	Service extended to Barrie.
Georgetown		1990-10-29	49	406.4 kilometres (252.5 mi)	14.3 kilometres (8.9 mi)	3.5%	Service extended to Guelph.
Lakeshore West		1992-05-25	50	406.4 kilometres (252.5 mi)	14.3 kilometres (8.9 mi)	3.5%	Aldershot opened.
Bradford; Georgetown		1993-07-05	48	346.3 kilometres (215.2 mi)	14.3 kilometres (8.9 mi)	4.1%	Service cut from Barrie and Guelph.
Lakeshore East		1995-01-09	49	350.6 kilometres (217.9 mi)	18.7 kilometres (11.6 mi)	5.3%	GO subdivision and service extended to Oshawa.
Lakeshore West		1996-04-29	49	351.6 kilometres (218.5 mi)	18.7 kilometres (11.6 mi)	5.3%	Hamilton service shifted to Hamilton GO Centre.
Milton		1997-03-31	49	351.6 kilometres (218.5 mi)	23.7 kilometres (14.7 mi)	6.7%	Galt subdivision purchased from CPR between West Toronto Diamond and Union Station.
Bradford		1999-04-30	49	351.6 kilometres (218.5 mi)	33.2 kilometres (20.6 mi)	9.5%	Newmarket subdivision purchased from CN north of East Gwillimbury.
USRC		2000-06-07	49	351.6 kilometres (218.5 mi)	52.1 kilometres (32.4 mi)	14.8%	Union Station Rail Corridor purchased from Toronto Terminals Railway.
Stouffville		2001	49	351.6 kilometres (218.5 mi)	84.2 kilometres (52.3 mi)	24.0%	Uxbridge subdivision purchased from CN (Scarborough - Uxbridge).
Bradford		2001-01-07	50	351.6 kilometres (218.5 mi)	84.2 kilometres (52.3 mi)	24.0%	Rutherford opened.
Bradford		2002-01-16	50	351.6 kilometres (218.5 mi)	122.0 kilometres (75.8 mi)	34.7%	Newmarket subdivision purchased from CN between East Gwillimbury and Davenport Diamond.
Stouffville		2002-09-03	51	351.6 kilometres (218.5 mi)	122.0 kilometres (75.8 mi)	34.7%	Centennial opened.
Bradford		2002-09-06	52	351.6 kilometres (218.5 mi)	122.0 kilometres (75.8 mi)	34.7%	York University opened.
Stouffville		2002-12-02	53	351.6 kilometres (218.5 mi)	122.0 kilometres (75.8 mi)	34.7%	Mount Joy opened.
Bradford		2004-11-01	54	351.6 kilometres (218.5 mi)	122.0 kilometres (75.8 mi)	34.7%	East Gwillimbury opened.
Georgetown		2005-02-07	55	351.6 kilometres (218.5 mi)	122.0 kilometres (75.8 mi)	34.7%	Mount Pleasant opened.
Stouffville		2005-06-02	56	351.6 kilometres (218.5 mi)	122.0 kilometres (75.8 mi)	34.7%	Kennedy opened.
Milton		2007-09-04	57	351.6 kilometres (218.5 mi)	122.0 kilometres (75.8 mi)	34.7%	Lisgar opened.
Barrie		2007-12-17	58	380.5 kilometres (236.4 mi)	150.8 kilometres (93.7 mi)	39.6%	Service extended to Barrie South, line renamed.
Stouffville		2008-09-02	59	383.0 kilometres (238.0 mi)	153.3 kilometres (95.3 mi)	40.0%	Service extended to Old Elm (formerly Lincolnville).
Georgetown		2009-04-08	59	383.0 kilometres (238.0 mi)	177.8 kilometres (110.5 mi)	46.4%	Weston subdivision purchased from CN (Bramalea – Union).
Barrie		2009-12-15	59	383.0 kilometres (238.0 mi)	193.4 kilometres (120.2 mi)	50.5%	Remainder of Newmarket subdivision purchased from CN (Davenport Diamond – Union).
Lakeshore East; Stouffville		2011-03-30	59	383.0 kilometres (238.0 mi)	234.0 kilometres (145.4 mi)	61.1%	Kingston subdivision purchased from CN between Union Station and Pickering.
Kitchener		2011-12-19	61	437.2 kilometres (271.7 mi)	234.0 kilometres (145.4 mi)	53.5%	Service extended to Kitchener. Line renamed.
Barrie		2012-01-30	62	442.9 kilometres (275.2 mi)	239.7 kilometres (148.9 mi)	54.1%	Allandale Waterfront opened.
Lakeshore West; Richmond Hill		2012-03-27	62	442.9 kilometres (275.2 mi)	300.5 kilometres (186.7 mi)	67.9%	Oakville subdivision purchased from CN between Union Station and Fourth Line; Bala subdivision purchased from CN between Union Station and Doncaster Diamond.
Kitchener		2013-01-07	63	442.9 kilometres (275.2 mi)	300.5 kilometres (186.7 mi)	67.9%	Acton opened.
Lakeshore West		2013-03-21	63	442.9 kilometres (275.2 mi)	313.9 kilometres (195.0 mi)	70.9%	Oakville subdivision purchased from CN between Fourth Line and Brant Street.
Kitchener		2014-09-29	63	442.9 kilometres (275.2 mi)	367.1 kilometres (228.1 mi)	82.9%	Guelph subdivision purchased from CN between Kitchener and Georgetown.
Lakeshore West		2015-07-09	64	446.1 kilometres (277.2 mi)	367.1 kilometres (228.1 mi)	82.3%	Service extended to West Harbour.
Richmond Hill		2016-12-05	65	453.6 kilometres (281.9 mi)	367.1 kilometres (228.1 mi)	80.9%	Service extended to Gormley.
Barrie		2017-12-30	66	453.6 kilometres (281.9 mi)	367.1 kilometres (228.1 mi)	80.9%	Downsview Park opened.
Lakeshore West		2019-01-07	68	522.5 kilometres (324.7 mi)	367.1 kilometres (228.1 mi)	70.3%	Service extended to Niagara Falls.
Richmond Hill		2021-06-28	69	526.1 kilometres (326.9 mi)	367.1 kilometres (228.1 mi)	69.8%	Service extended to Bloomington.
Barrie		2021-07-19	68	526.1 kilometres (326.9 mi)	367.1 kilometres (228.1 mi)	69.8%	York University station closes.
Lakeshore West		2025-10-27	69	526.1 kilometres (326.9 mi)	367.1 kilometres (228.1 mi)	69.8%	Confederation station opens.
Kitchener		2025-11-16	70	526.1 kilometres (326.9 mi)	367.1 kilometres (228.1 mi)	69.8%	Mount Dennis station opens.
Kitchener		2026-07-06	71	568.4 kilometres (353.2 mi)	367.1 kilometres (228.1 mi)	64.6%	Service extended to Stratford.

=== Future extensions ===
==== Lakeshore East to Bowmanville ====
A 20 km extension of the Lakeshore East line to Bowmanville was announced by then-premier Kathleen Wynne in 2016. Construction began on July 22, 2024 and is not expected to finish for years. No completion date has been provided. The extension is expected to cost $730 million, and will provide two-way all day service. The line will travel upwards from the current Oshawa GO station and continue along the CPKC corridor to Bowmanville, adding four more stations, Thornton's Corners East, Ritson, Courtice, and Bowmanville.

==== Stouffville to Uxbridge ====
Rail beyond Stouffville to Uxbridge was previously owned by the York–Durham Heritage Railway (YDHR). After the YDHR went bankrupt in January 2024, Uxbridge considered extending rail operations. Uxbridge decided in December 2024 that the liability and obligations were not worth the cost, and decided to reject a Stouffville extension to Uxbridge.

=== Future improvements ===
==== Two-way all day service on the Milton line ====
The Milton line corridor is owned and operated by Canadian Pacific Kansas City which has restricted the number of passenger trains, only allowing for one-way service. In 2024, the Ontario government under Doug Ford called on the federal government to share the cost of construction for two-way all day service on the Milton line. The project would involve a complete separation from CPKC's tracks by building dedicated GO Transit tracks along the rail corridor, and is estimated to be at $6 billion dollars. No timeline has been provided, construction has not yet started, and seems to have been supplanted by the "GO 2.0" project to build the Missing Link.

A long-proposed solution to allow access for passenger trains on the Midtown line is a re-routing of CPKC freight traffic known as the "Missing Link". The Missing Link would extend the Halton subdivision along Highway 407 and link back up with the Midtown corridor between Lisgar GO Station and Milton GO Station. This would free up the Midtown corridor and the Milton line for passenger rail. In 2015, Mississauga attempted a feasibility study for the Missing Link, but did not go forward with constructing it. The Missing Link is considered an ambitious project, requiring negotiations to make CPKC and CN share the Halton and York subdivision (both of which are currently owned by CN). In 2024, the Progressive Conservative Party announced plans to build the Missing Link to free up both the Milton and Kitchener line.

==== GO train electrification ====
In 2010, then-premier Kathleen Wynne announced plans to electrify GO Transit. Electrification would drastically cut down on GO Transit's carbon emissions and would allow GO Transit to run faster, more frequent trains, increasing ridership. In 2018, it was decided to use an overhead wire system over a third rail. Hydrogen fuel cells were studied as an alternative to rail electrification but ultimately were deemed unfeasible. A report suggested the trains would be 30% faster and 60% cheaper per kilometre. In 2022, the Ontario government under premier Doug Ford began the first phase of electrification, with plans to electrify 600 kilometres of track and an estimated finish date of 2032.

==== Track works ====
Single tracked segments on the GO network prevent increases in rail service. Metrolinx is currently constructing a second track on the Stouffville line between Kennedy and Unionville GO.

The Kitchener line has no current plans to double track further beyond Mount Pleasant GO, however Metrolinx is constructing strategic passing siding to improve capacity. Metrolinx has plans to expand the passing siding near Breslau, add a passing siding at Guelph GO, and a passing siding at Acton GO.

The Barrie line is mostly single tracked and construction is currently underway to add a second set of tracks up to Aurora GO.

=== Future lines ===
==== Bolton line ====
GO Transit rail service to Bolton was first proposed by the Ontario government under the MoveOntario 2020 plan in June 2007. It was subsequently carried over to The Big Move, where it was placed on the 15-year plan. In November 2010, Metrolinx completed a feasibility study that focused on utilization of Canadian Pacific Railway's Mactier subdivision, which runs from the West Toronto Diamond in Toronto northward to Bolton. Four different service alternatives were assessed to determine the best method to carry passengers into Toronto from the Mactier subdivision, and the preferred option was to direct trains east-west along CN's Halton subdivision, and north-south again along GO Transit's existing Barrie line. This would provide four new stations in the communities of Woodbridge and Kleinburg in the City of Vaughan, and Bolton in the Town of Caledon, and also use the existing Downsview Park station before terminating at Union.

The feasibility study estimated that minimum infrastructure costs were $160 million for peak direction rush-hour service, and resulting ridership was forecasted to be 2,391, 2,884, and 4,388 in 2015, 2021, and 2031, respectively, in the morning peak period. If service was increased for two-way all-day service, total costs increased to $210 million, and ridership was forecasted to be 6,074, 7,324, and 11,146 in 2015, 2021, and 2031, respectively. Metrolinx determined that the projected ridership did not justify the costs, and downgraded the Bolton line from the 15- to the 25-year plan on February 14, 2013, when amendments were made to The Big Move.

In 2025, as part of a campaign promise, the Progressive Conservative Party under Doug Ford announced plans to create the Bolton line.

==== Midtown corridor and Peterborough line ====
The Midtown corridor refers to three new GO Transit services in The Big Move. The first is a Crosstown line from Dundas Street to the former CP North Toronto and Leaside stations in Toronto. The second and third segments would extend east from North Toronto and/or Union: the Seaton line to Seaton, and the Locust Hill line to Locust Hill.

GO Transit has contemplated a Midtown corridor since the 1980s as a contingency plan once capacity at Union Station became constrained, making North Toronto an alternate station for Downtown Toronto. The major barrier to these plans, however, is the fact that the Midtown corridor is composed of existing rail lines owned and actively used by the CPKC as its main freight line between Ottawa, Montreal, London and Windsor. CPKC has been reluctant to provide capacity to GO Transit on its tracks, and the Milton line (which runs along CPKC tracks to the west) only came after considerable negotiations, the 1979 Mississauga train derailment, and an investment of hundreds of millions of dollars.

All three lines in the corridor were listed under the 15-year plan of The Big Move upon its publication in 2008. However, the Havelock line was moved to the 25-year plan on February 14, 2013, because of "very modest ridership potential and significant infrastructure and operational challenges related to the Agincourt rail yards."

Via Rail provided train service to Peterborough until 1990, when service was cancelled. The potential to provide commuter rail service to Peterborough was noted by GO Transit in its 2020 strategic plan, and was also included in The Big Move. Metrolinx completed a study for bringing commuter rail service to Peterborough in February 2010. Different routes were explored, all of which use CPKC's existing Havelock subdivision between Peterborough and Toronto. Once reaching Toronto, three different routes were explored through the east end, to deal with the same "significant infrastructure and operational challenges related to the Agincourt rail yards" that complicate GO's Havelock line. The study also kept the option open of using either Union Station or North Toronto station as the terminus of the line. Capital costs to upgrading the Havelock subdivision were estimated to be between C$329 and 384 million. GO introduced bus service between Peterborough and Oshawa on September 5, 2009.

In 2024, the Progressive Conservative Party announced plans to build the Missing Link, and in 2025 as part of a campaign promise the Progressive Conservative Party announced plans to create the Midtown Line, spanning from Streetsville GO Station in the east to Caledon in the west.

==== Cambridge–Guelph rail link ====
Proposals from regional councillors have pushed for a rail link between Cambridge and Guelph operated by Metrolinx, with an estimated 14 to 17 minute travel time and frequency of every 30 to 60 minutes. The line would be built along a Canadian National spur between the two cities. Reports have forecasted a ridership of over 500,000 by 2041, and would cut travel time between Cambridge and Union Station to 87 minutes.

== Operations ==
Since the founding of GO Transit in 1967, GO trains have operated in push-pull configuration. Each train has a locomotive on the east end and a cab control car on the west end. In push configuration, the cab car has a complete set of engineer's controls built into it, allowing the engineer to remotely control the locomotive pushing the whole train from the back of the train. This enables trains to travel in either direction without requiring one locomotive on each end.

=== Onboard procedures ===
All GO trains have a total of three crew members. The conductor and engineer are located in the locomotive or the cab car to operate the train. Another guard-like staff member, the Customer Service Ambassador (CSA), is located in the accessibility coach, which is the fifth car from the locomotive. The CSA is responsible for opening and closing the train doors, making announcements over the PA system, and acts as the first responder in case of an emergency on board.

The CSA announces the next station after the train departs a station, and an automated voice will repeat the announcement when the train arrives at its next station. Automated public service announcements are made in both English and French.

When a train arrives at a station, the CSA puts a small accessibility bridge across the gap between the platform and the doorway. This is to allow passengers with mobility devices such as wheelchairs, walkers, or strollers to board and exit the train. Each car has a number of accessibility seats provided. If the CSA sees a passenger with a physical disability and there are no accessibility seats available, they could ask that a passenger sitting in one of those seats to move to another area in the train to allow the passenger with a disability to sit in an accessibility seat.

Before closing the doors, the CSA will make an announcement that the doors are closing and will remind passengers to stand clear of the doorways. All cars have a speaker above the doors, which plays a door closing chime in the form of a descending major triad. The chimes are an accessibility feature intended to warn the visually-impaired that the doors are closing.

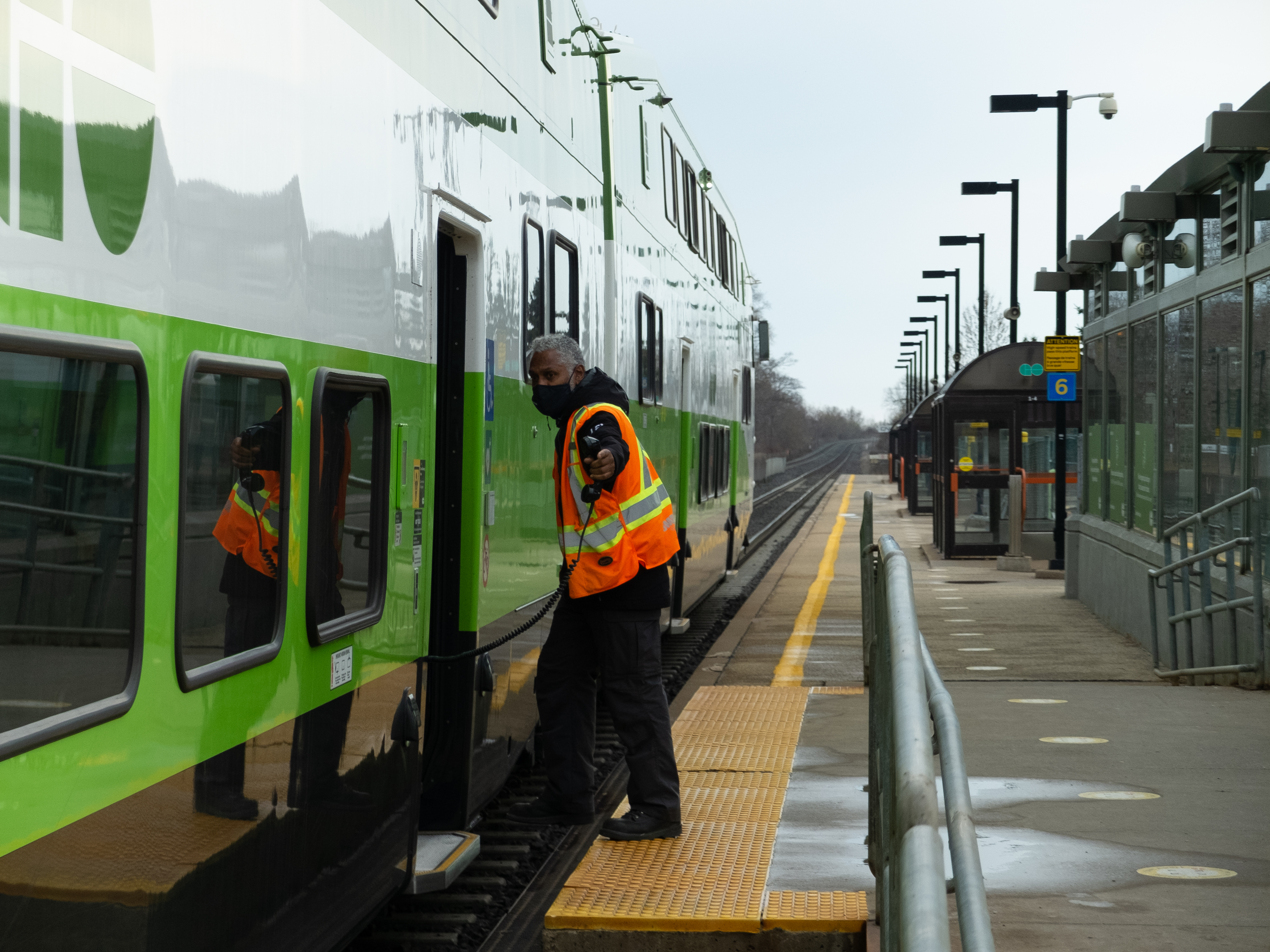
A CSA points at the doors at Rouge Hill Station after closing them for safety. This "shisa kanko" method was adopted by GO Transit in March 2021.

In March 2021, Metrolinx adopted the Japanese shisa kanko (pointing and calling) method. Upon entering a station, but before opening the doors, the CSA is required to point towards both ends of the train and announce that the platform is clear as a way to confirm that the train is stopped properly. After the CSA closes the doors, the same process is repeated to confirm that nobody is caught in the doors. According to Metrolinx, incorporating the pointing and calling procedure within GO Transit's daily operations is an important way to enhance safety, "especially as the transit agency gets ready to launch the largest expansion of GO service in it’s [sic] history".

=== Extreme weather ===
In winter conditions, trains are stored near Union Station to so that afternoon and evening trains can travel through less snow. Trains are kept at specific temperatures during storage to speed up engine startup on cold days and to eliminate frozen train doors. Fans are used to blow hot air onto track switches to keep them from freezing in extreme cold. Track snow removal is conducted using high-pressure blower snow removal equipment.

In the event of exceptionally severe winter conditions, GO trains run on different schedules. Express trains will stop at all stations. The cancellation of train trips may occur, as well as replacing trains with buses.

GO Transit inspects train air conditioning more frequently during summer, as A/C systems have to work harder on hot days.

In extremely hot weather, train tracks can expand and buckle under the heat. These "sun kinks" can occur when temperatures are above 30 degrees Celsius for at least 48 hours. For safety reasons, sun kinks require trains to be operated at reduced speeds. Sun kinks are usually fixed overnight or in the early morning.

=== Holiday service ===
On holidays that fall on weekdays, service changes will occur. The following table shows the service type by holiday.

GO Transit holiday service
Service type	Holidays
Saturday service	Victoria Day; Canada Day; Civic Holiday; Christmas Day observed
Sunday service	Good Friday; Labour Day; Thanksgiving; Christmas
Early homebound service	Christmas Eve; New Year's Eve

=== Service expansion ===
According to Metrolinx, GO Rail service expansion is currently being undertaken. When complete, GO Rail service will run from 5 a.m. to 2 a.m. on each line. The following table shows the expected service frequency per line when expansion is complete.

GO Transit expected service frequency
Line	Peak frequency	Off-peak frequency
Lakeshore West	15 minutes	60 minutes
Lakeshore East	15 minutes	
Milton	15 minutes	
Stouffville	20 minutes	60 minutes
Richmond Hill	15–30 minutes	
Kitchener		15–60 minutes
Barrie	30 minutes	60 minutes

Start times and service frequency on weekends may vary.

== Rolling stock ==
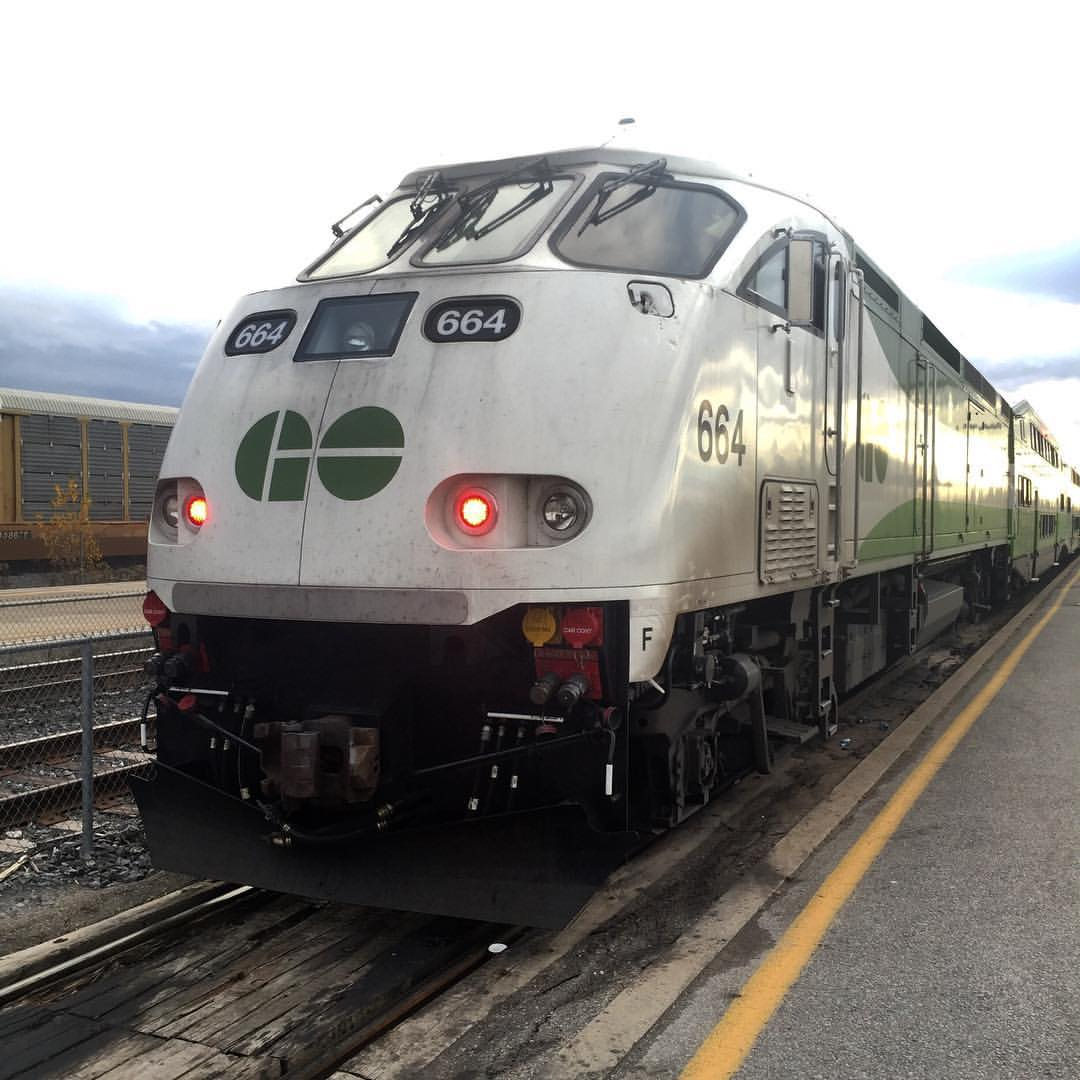
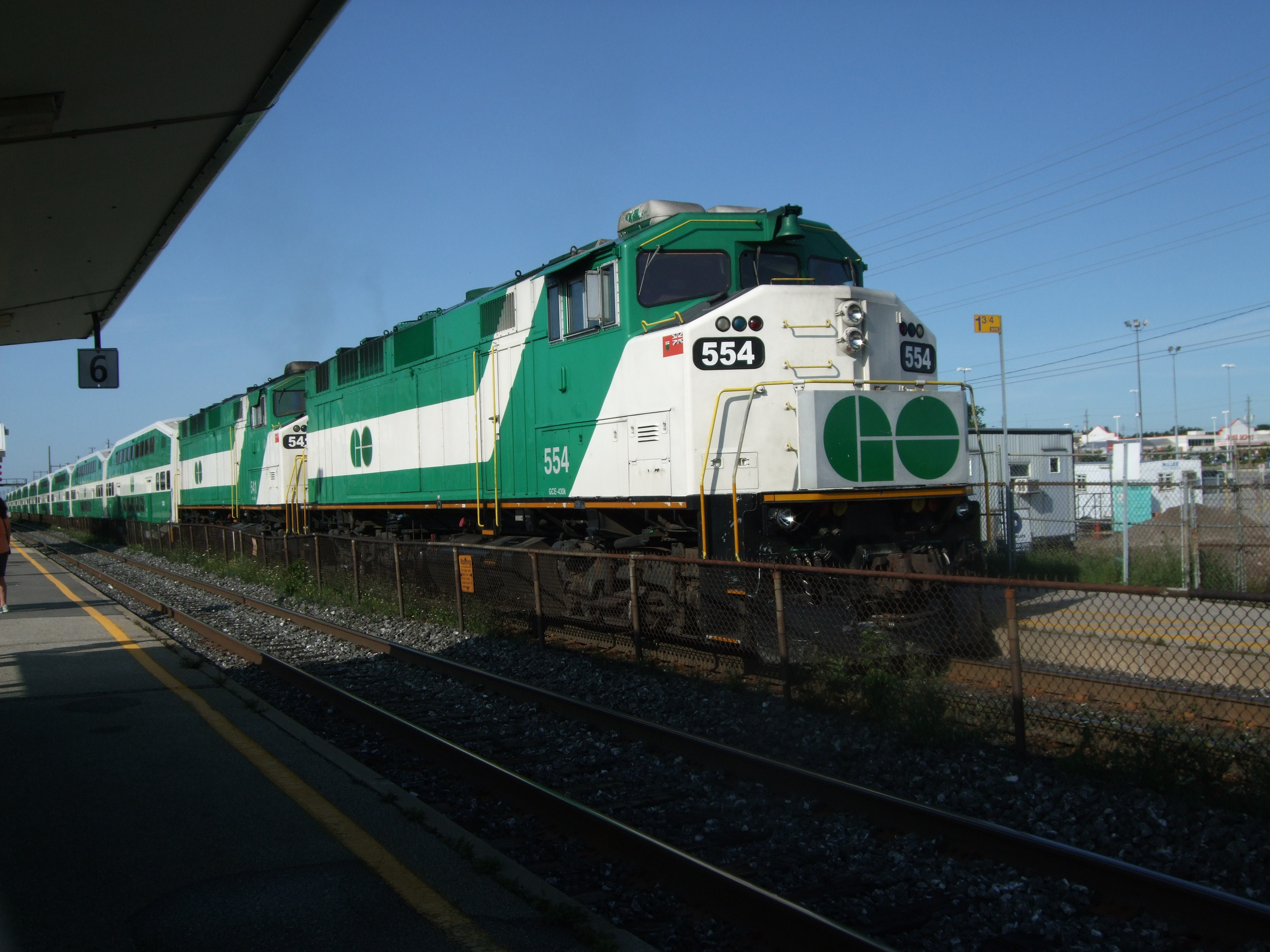
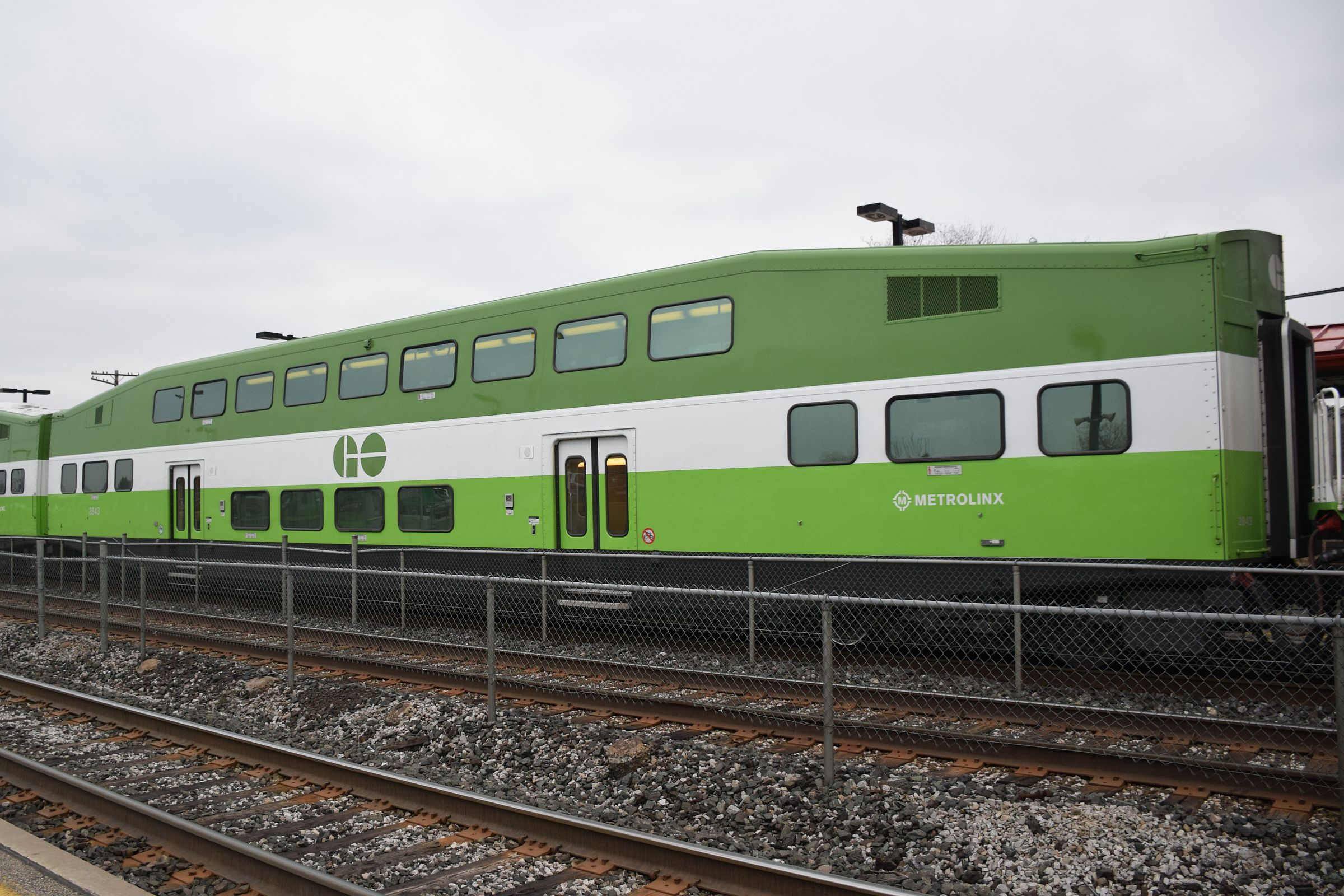
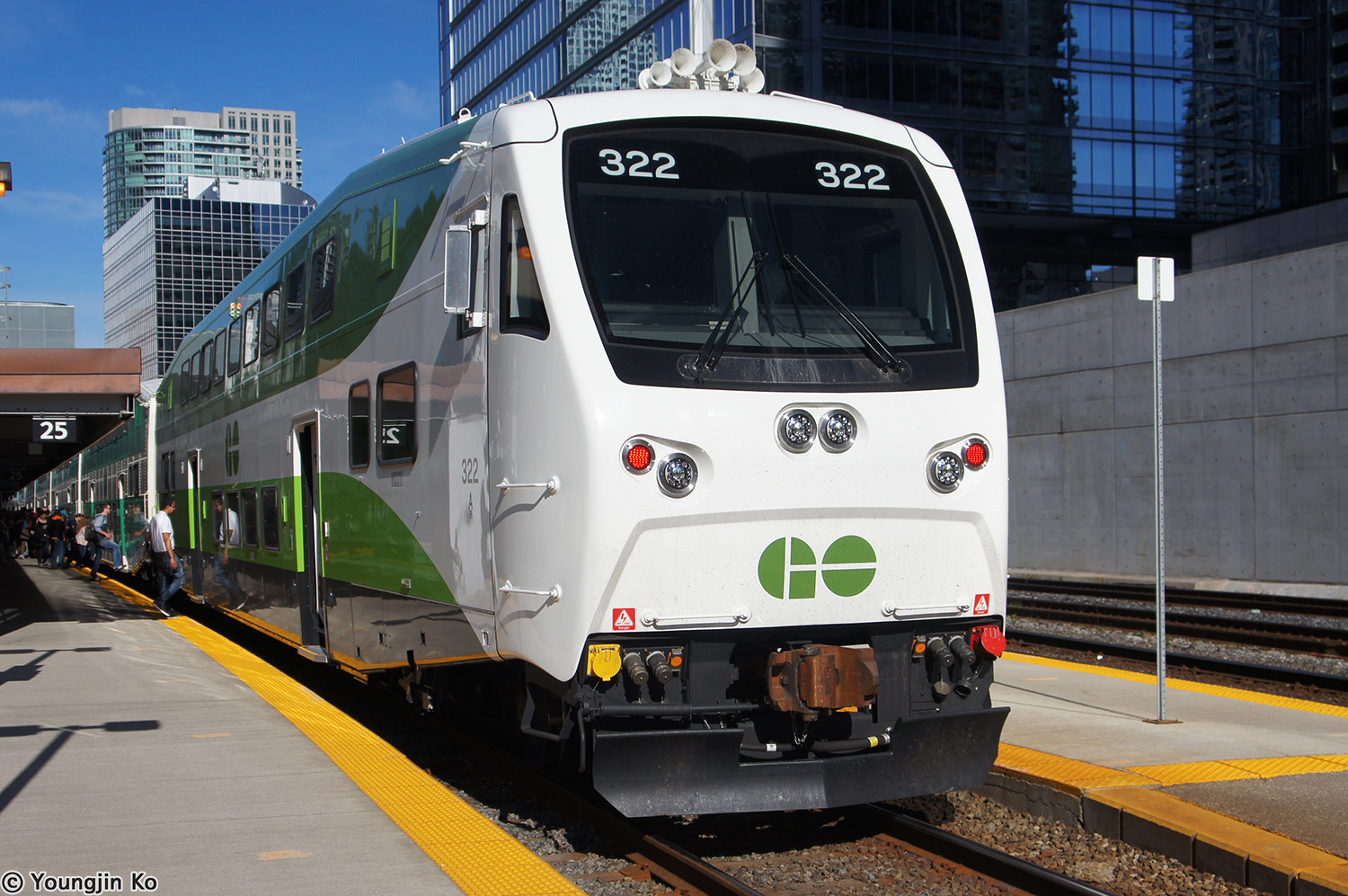
Two locomotives, coach and cab car currently used by GO Transit.
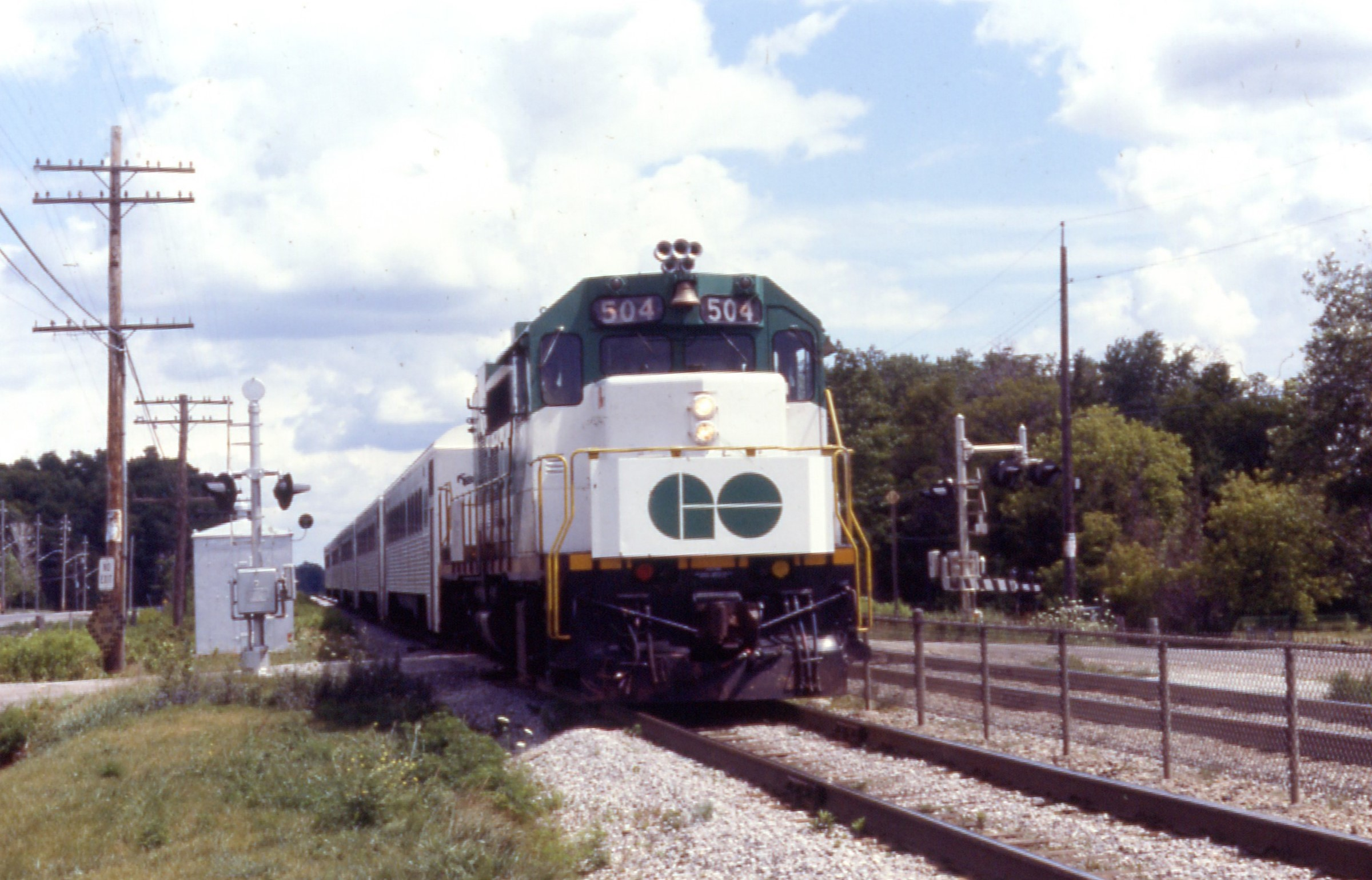
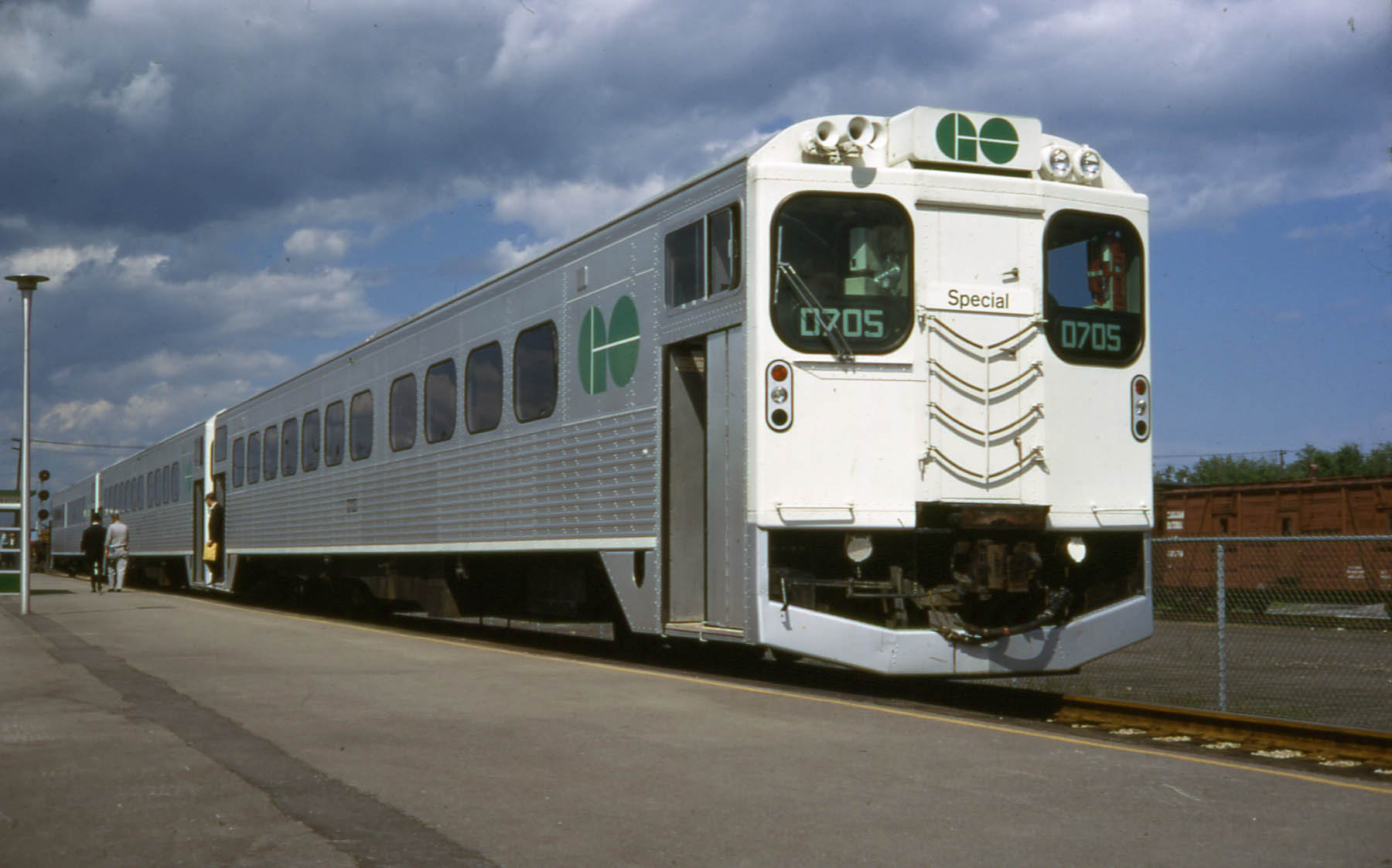
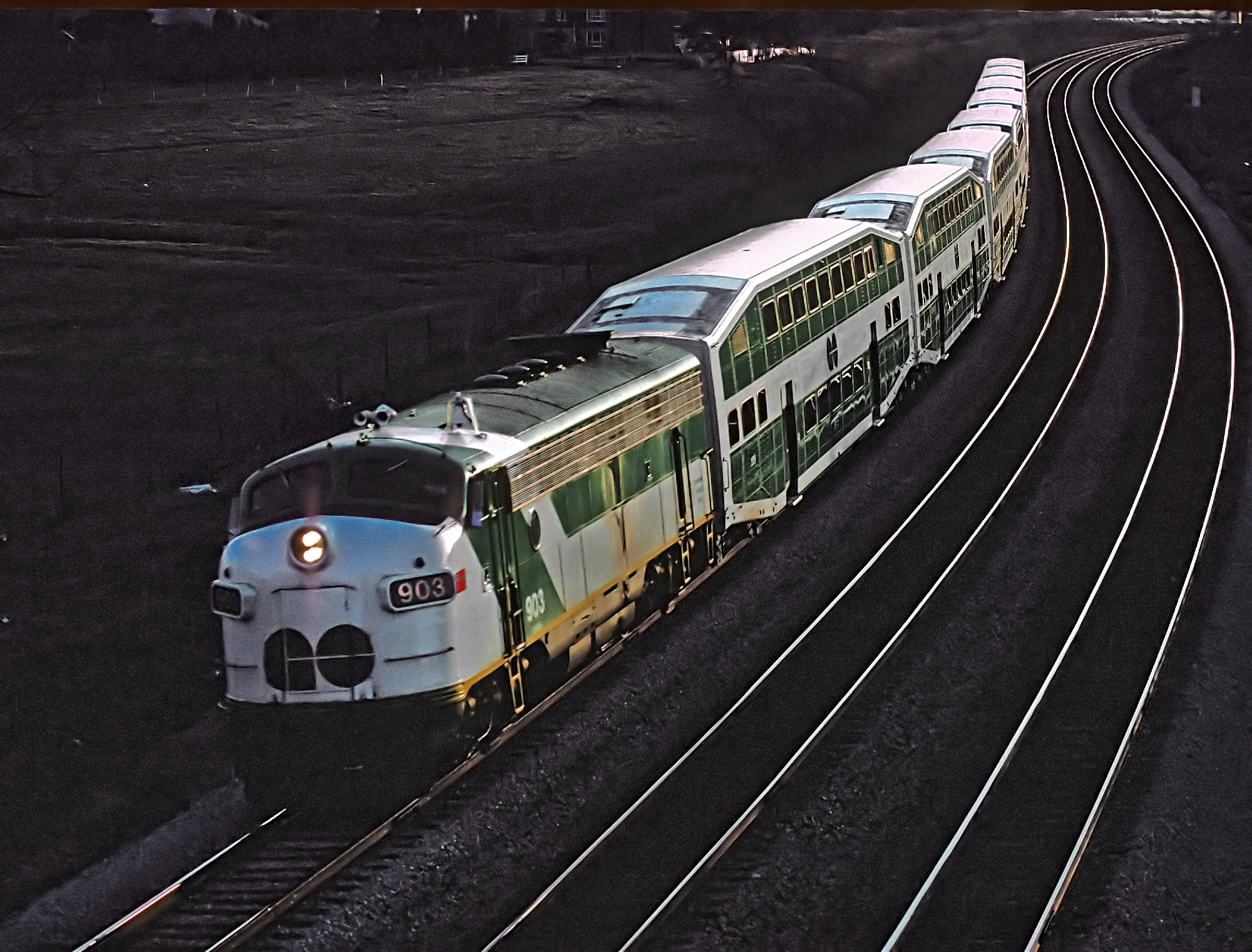
Previous locomotives and coaches used by GO Transit

=== Locomotives ===
The following table shows the GO Transit locomotive fleet by vehicle type.

GO Transit locomotives
Vehicle	Manufacturer	Number of vehicles
F59PH	Electro-Motive Diesel	8
MP40PH-3C	MotivePower	67
MP54AC	MotivePower	16

==== F59PH ====
The EMD F59PH is the oldest of the three currently active series of locomotives used by GO Transit. They are 3000-horsepower diesel-electric locomotives capable of travelling up to 134 kilometers an hour, and can accelerate a ten-car train from 0 to 100 km/h in about 75 seconds. The F59PH was also the first series of locomotives used by GO Transit that feature dynamic braking, the effectiveness of which was greatly increased to as low as 8 km/h.

The introduction of the first sixteen F59PH series locomotives in 1988 allowed for the retirement of the previously used EMD GP40TC locomotives. Eleven additional locomotives, delivered between 1989 and 1990, replaced the EMD F40PH and some of the EMD GP40-2L(W) locomotives. The remaining GP40-2L(W)s were replaced by fourteen more F59PHs in 1990. Finally, in 1994, six additional F59PHs replaced the EMD GP40U series. By 1994, GO Transit's locomotive fleet consisted of only the F59PH, which allowed easier maintenance.

Despite the fact that the F59PH was designed to last 30 years, the locomotives were less reliable than hoped. In 2009, when the MPI MP40PH-3C series locomotives became available, GO Transit began retiring the F59PH series. In the end, only eight F59PH units remained on the GO Transit roster. These units have been rebuilt for continued service in 2011.

==== MP40PH-3C ====
The MPI MP40PH-3C is the older of the two currently active series of MotivePower locomotives used by GO Transit. They are 4000-horsepower locomotives capable of hauling twelve passenger cars, and have a speed of up to 150 km/h. The MP40PH-3C is GO Transit's first series of locomotives capable of supplying power to power a 12-car train all by themselves, as opposed to the F59PH which is slower and can only pull 10 cars.

In 2005, GO Transit contracted with MotivePower to build 27 MP40PH-3C units in order to expand its fleet and replace the existing F59PH locomotives which had been in service for almost 20 years. The first set of MP40PH-3Cs began arriving in late 2007 and operated on the Lakeshore East and West lines, followed by the Milton line.

The new locomotives proved to be powerful and reliable, prompting GO Transit to place an order for an additional set of 20 locomotives. Deliveries of the new set began in late 2009 and continued into 2010. An additional set of ten locomotives was delivered in 2010.

The introduction of the MP40PH-3C allowed GO Transit to retire the older F59PH locomotives. Another ten MP40PH-3C locomotives were purchased later and were delivered in 2013 and 2014 when GO Transit found that additional equipment was required to expand rail service.

==== MP54AC ====
The MPI MP54AC is the latest series of locomotives used in the GO Transit rail system. It is a 5400-horsepower locomotive that MPI calls "the most powerful diesel passenger locomotive in North America".

GO Transit was the first customer to use the MP54AC. In 2012, GO Transit MP40PH-3C #647 was sent back to MPI and was converted into an MP54AC. It was returned to GO Transit in 2015. Testing of the converted locomotive was conducted December 12, 2015.

The original plan was to convert ten MP40PH-3Cs into MP54ACs if the first conversion was successful. However, increasing service demands led to the order of sixteen brand new MP54ACs instead.

=== Passenger cars ===
The following tables shows the GO Transit’s 979 Bilevel passenger cars.

GO Transit Bilevel passenger cars
Vehicle	Manufacturer	Number of vehicles	Number of seats
Series I	Hawker Siddeley	70	162
Series II	Hawker Siddeley	56	162
Series III	Can-Car Rail	54	162
Series IV	Can-Car Rail	42	162
Series V	Can-Car Rail	100	162
Series VI	Bombardier	22	133
Series VII	Bombardier	85	133
Series VIII	Bombardier	155	133 or 151
Series IX	Bombardier	267	133

GO Transit Bilevel cab cars
Vehicle	Manufacturer	Number of vehicles	Number of seats
Series II	Hawker Siddeley	15	161
Series III	Can-Car Rail	9	160
Series IV	Can-Car Rail	17	160
Series VII	Bombardier	9	147
Series VIII	Bombardier	7	147
Series IX	Bombardier	82	133

== Maintenance and storage ==
=== Maintenance facilities ===
The Willowbrook Rail Maintenance Facility is GO's original rail maintenance facility, covering 18,600 m^{2} (200,000 ft^{2}). It is along the Lakeshore West line, directly west of Mimico GO Station, and directly north of Via Rail's Toronto Maintenance Centre. The yard includes four progressive maintenance bays, a locomotive shop, a coach repair shop and storage tracks for 21 trains.

In 2018, GO Transit opened the Whitby Rail Maintenance Facility, along the Lakeshore East line. This second rail maintenance facility is 46,000 m^{2} (500,000 ft^{2}), more than twice the size of Willowbrook. It includes two progressive maintenance bays, repair shops for 11 coaches and 12 locomotives, two washing stations and storage tracks for 13 trains. The facility was constructed to handle service expansions, which include the GO Transit Regional Express Rail program.

As of 2025, Alstom handles the operation and maintenance of GO trains.

=== Train layovers ===
GO Transit train layover facilities
Name	Location	Coordinates	Trains	Notes
Allandale GO Station	24 Essa Road, Barrie	44°22′29″N 79°41′19″W	6	New facility added near former CN Allandale Railway station.
North Bathurst Yard	355 Front Street West, Toronto	43°38′32″N 79°23′40″W	7	Originally owned by Canadian National it was transferred to GO in the 1980s and opened in 1987.
Bradford GO Station	300 Holland Street East, Bradford	44°07′09″N 79°33′27″W	3	Temporary; EA for permanent facility in progress
Don Yard	470 Lake Shore Boulevard East, Toronto	43°39′10″N 79°21′01″W	10	
Georgetown GO Station	55 Queen Street, Georgetown	43°39′20″N 79°55′07″W	4	
Hamilton GO Centre	36 Hunter Street East, Hamilton	43°15′11″N 79°52′09″W	4	
Kitchener (Park Street)	575 King Street West, Kitchener	43°27′11″N 80°30′06″W	2	Previously meant to be replaced by Shirley yard, but both are in use as of September 2023.
Kitchener (Shirley Avenue)	200 Shirley Avenue, Kitchener	43°28′04″N 80°27′26″W	4	
Lewis Road Layover	Lewis Road, Hamilton	43°12′59″N 79°39′10″W	4	
Old Elm GO Station	6840 Bethesda Road, Stouffville	43°59′41″N 79°14′04″W	6	GO Transit Stouffville Yard, consists of 6 tracks
Milton Yard	7374 5th Line, Milton	43°32′25″N 79°50′40″W	10	
UP Express Storage Track	175 City View Drive, Toronto	43°42′20″N 79°35′20″W	1	For use by UP Express.
Whitby Layover Yard	1300 Henry Street, Whitby	43°51′59″N 78°56′51″W	3	

Metrolinx is planning a new storage facility along the Richmond Hill GO Line south of Oriole GO Station near York Mills Road. Metrolinx is also planning a new layover facility to hold five trains parallel to the Lakeshore East line just east of Midland Avenue.

=== Overhaul ===
From 2004 to 2011 Ontario Northland Railway overhauled 121 Bi-Level cars at their North Bay Yard.

== Controversies ==
In December 2018, GO Transit banned CSA Gordon "Gord" Plumridge from singing Christmas carols over the PA system on the train after a complaint from a passenger. Plumridge, who had been singing Christmas carols for over a decade, created parodies of popular Christmas carols inspired by GO Transit (for example, he changed the lyrics of "Let It Snow! Let It Snow! Let It Snow!" to "Take the GO, take the GO, take the GO!") and sang them on the Barrie line and Lakeshore West line. Many passengers were fond of Plumridge's service and singing. When asked about the reason for the ban by CTV News, Metrolinx spokesperson Anne Marie Aikins said, "We understand that a customer didn't appreciate the singing, 'cause he was up in the Quiet Zone, and the Quiet Zone, people really like it that it's quiet, and that they can sleep." She stated that a compromise was made between Plumridge and Bombardier, the company who was contracted to provide services to GO Transit. Plumridge was then allowed to sing only to the people in his train coach with permission.

== See also ==
- Commuter rail in North America
