= Pointing and calling =

Railway safety technique

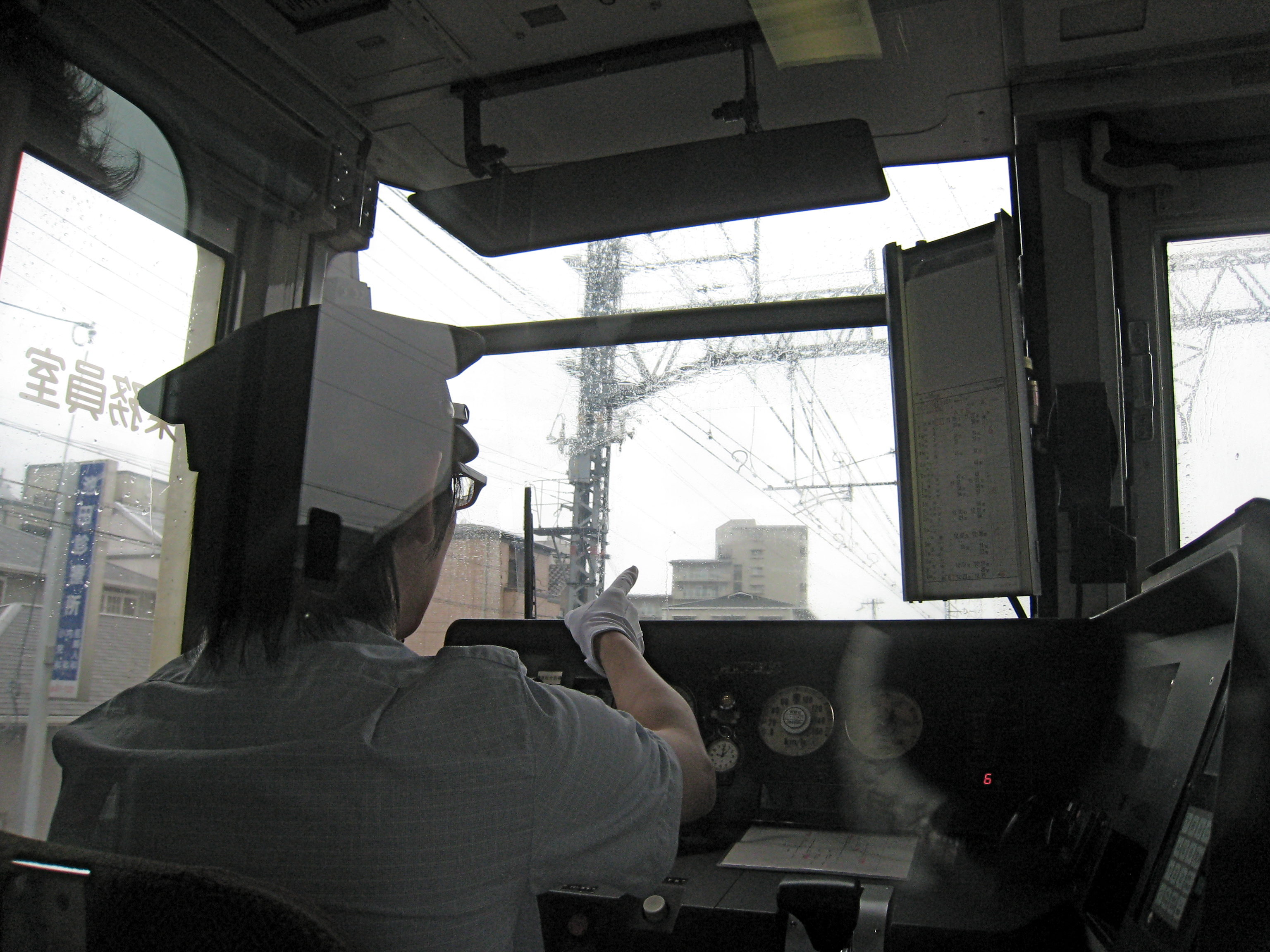
Train driver pointing

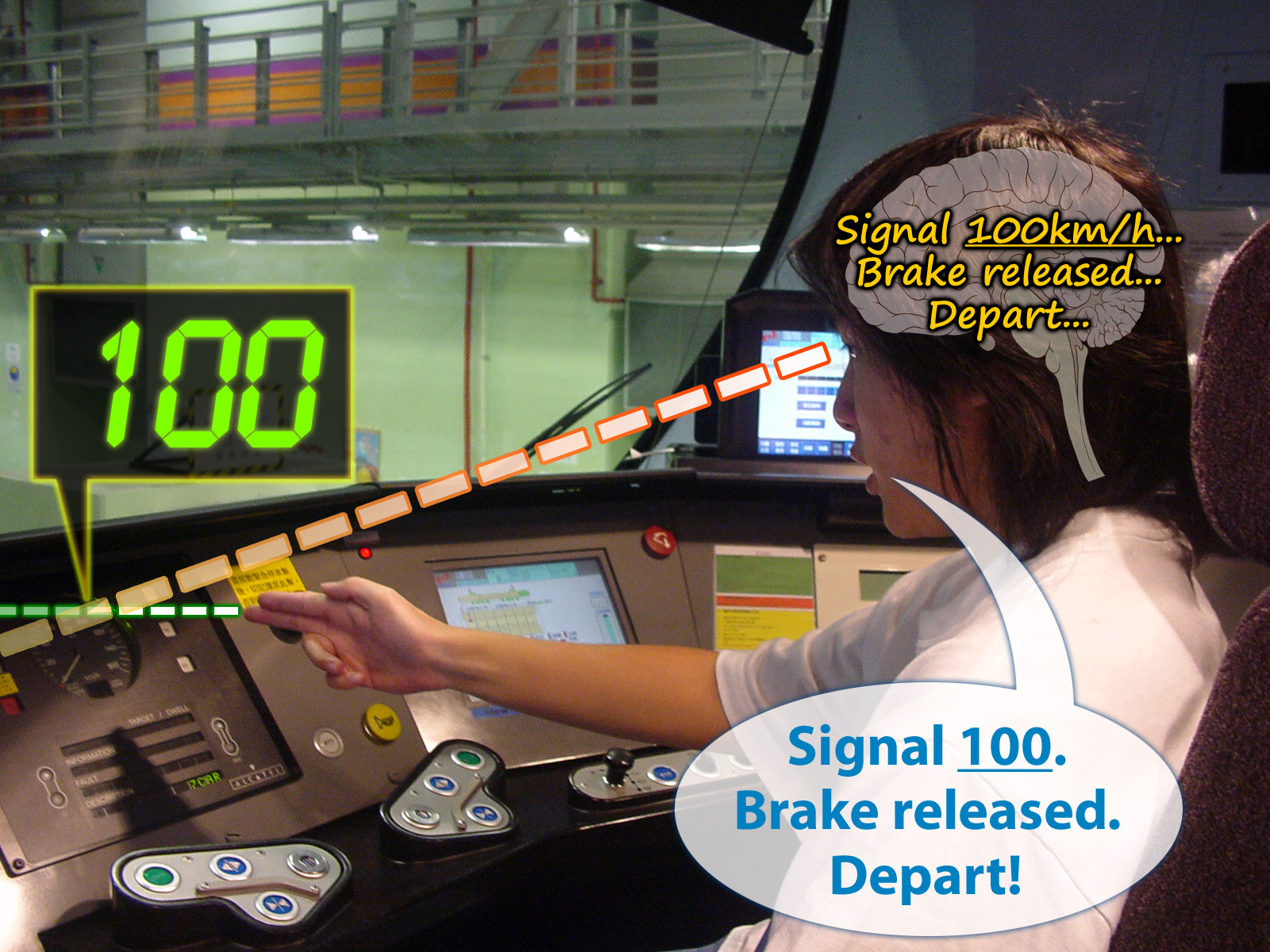

(video) different train operators and factory workers using Pointing and Calling.

Pointing and calling is a method in occupational safety for avoiding mistakes by pointing at important indicators and verbally calling out their status. It is especially common on Japanese railways, where it is referred to as shisa kanko (指差喚呼), shisa kakunin kanko (指差確認喚呼) or yubisashi koshō (指差呼称); in Mainland Chinese and Taiwanese railways, where it is called 指差呼唤; 指差確認 (zhǐchā hūhuàn; zhǐchā quèrèn); and in Indonesian railways, where it is known as tunjuk-sebut. Gesturing at and verbalizing these indicators helps with focus. The method was first used by train drivers and is now commonly used in Japanese industry. It is recommended by the Japan Industrial Safety and Health Association (JISHA, 中央労働災害防止協会), and a part of railway management regulations in China. It is not common outside of Asia, though it is used in the New York City Subway system, Toronto's subway and GO Transit, and many systems built to Chinese standards, such as the Addis Ababa-Djibouti Railway.

== History ==
The method originated in Japan in the early 1900s, when steam locomotives predominated. Drivers and boilermen would both look out for signals and call out their status to each other. The pointing was added a few decades later. There, this practice is referred to as shisa kanko (指差喚呼), shisa kakunin kanko (指差確認喚呼) or yubisashi koshō (指差呼称)

== Asia ==
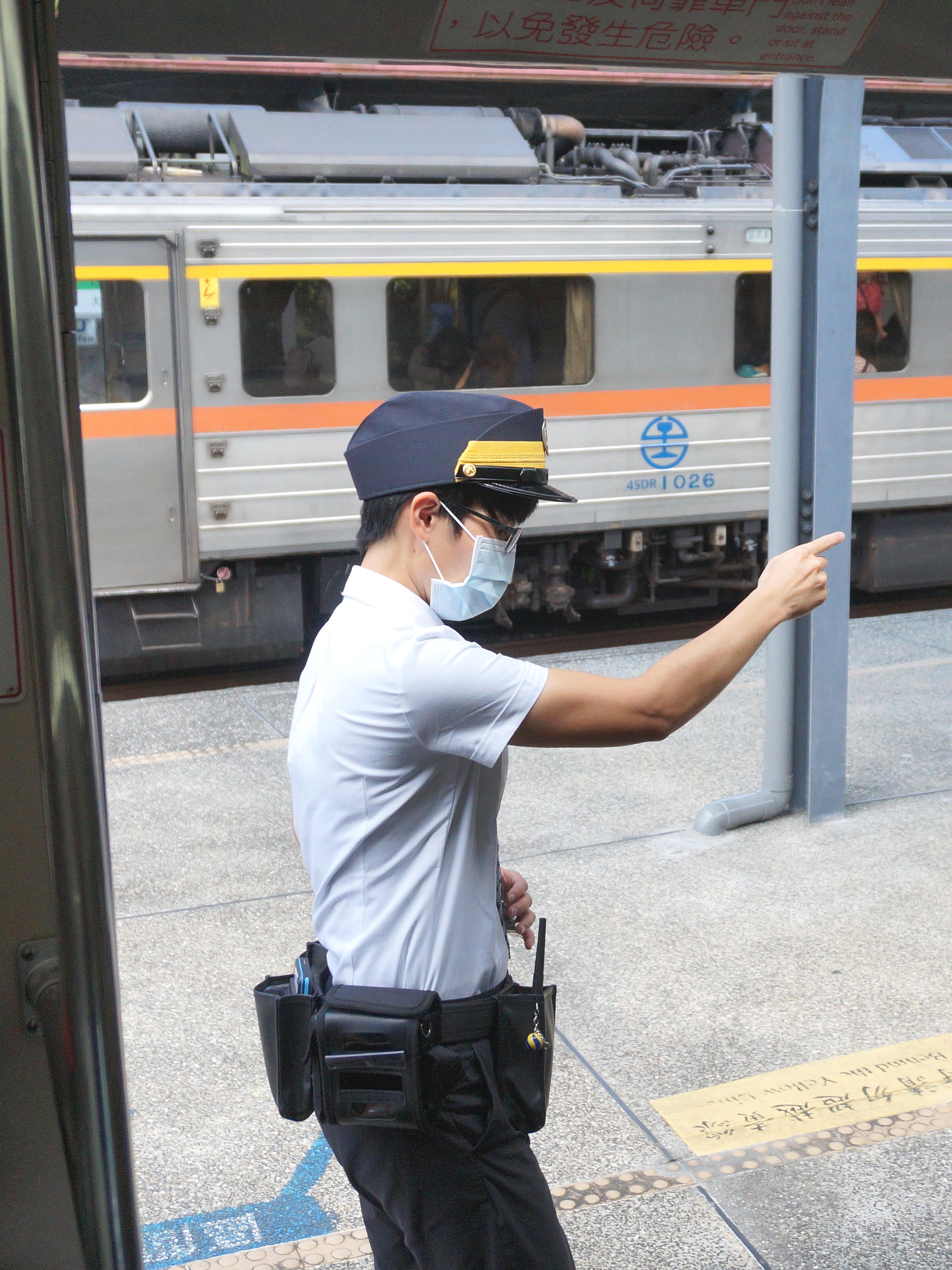
A TRA conductor pointing and calling before closing the train door at Shifen Station.

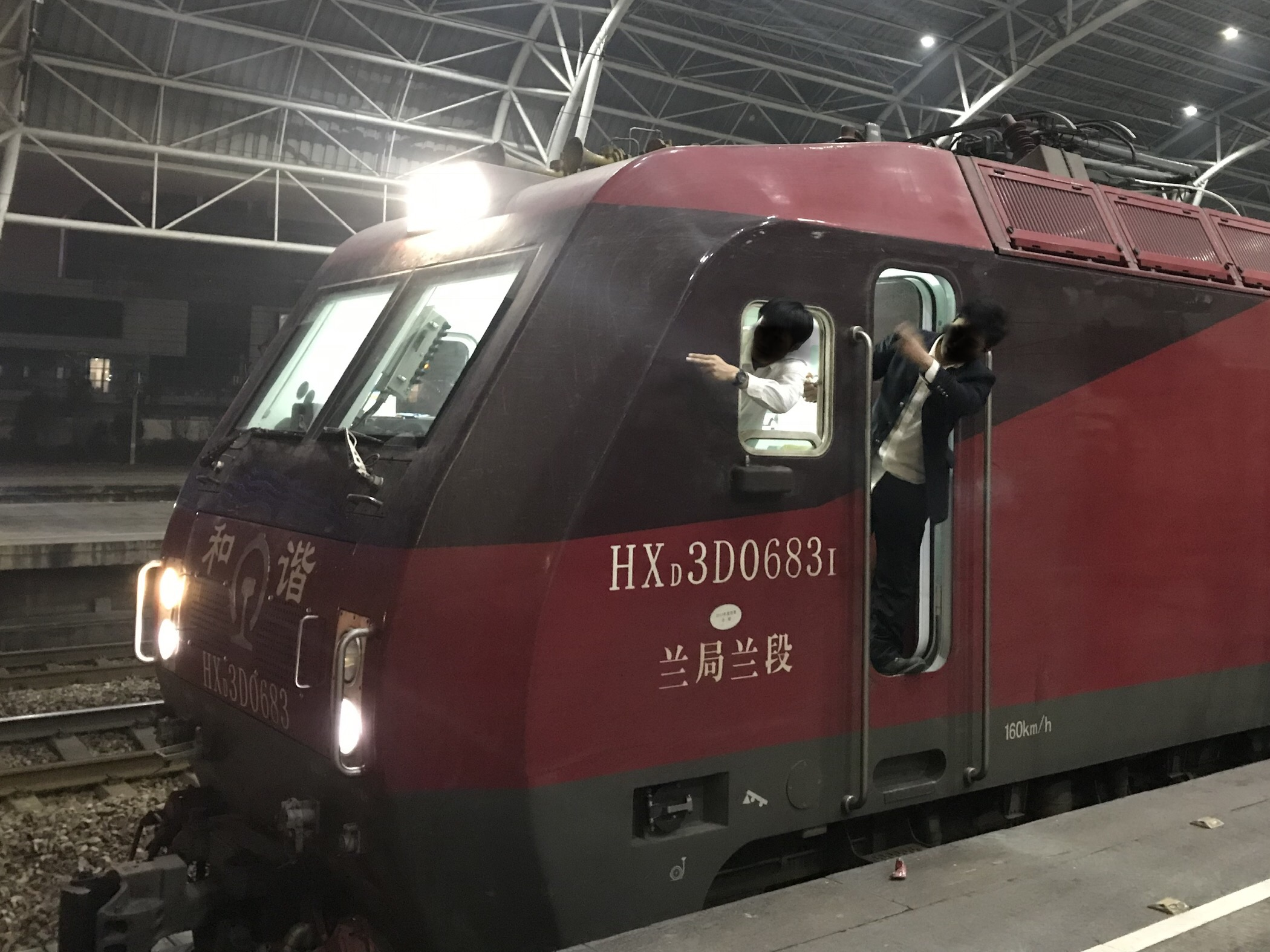
Chinese train engineers do pointing and calling.

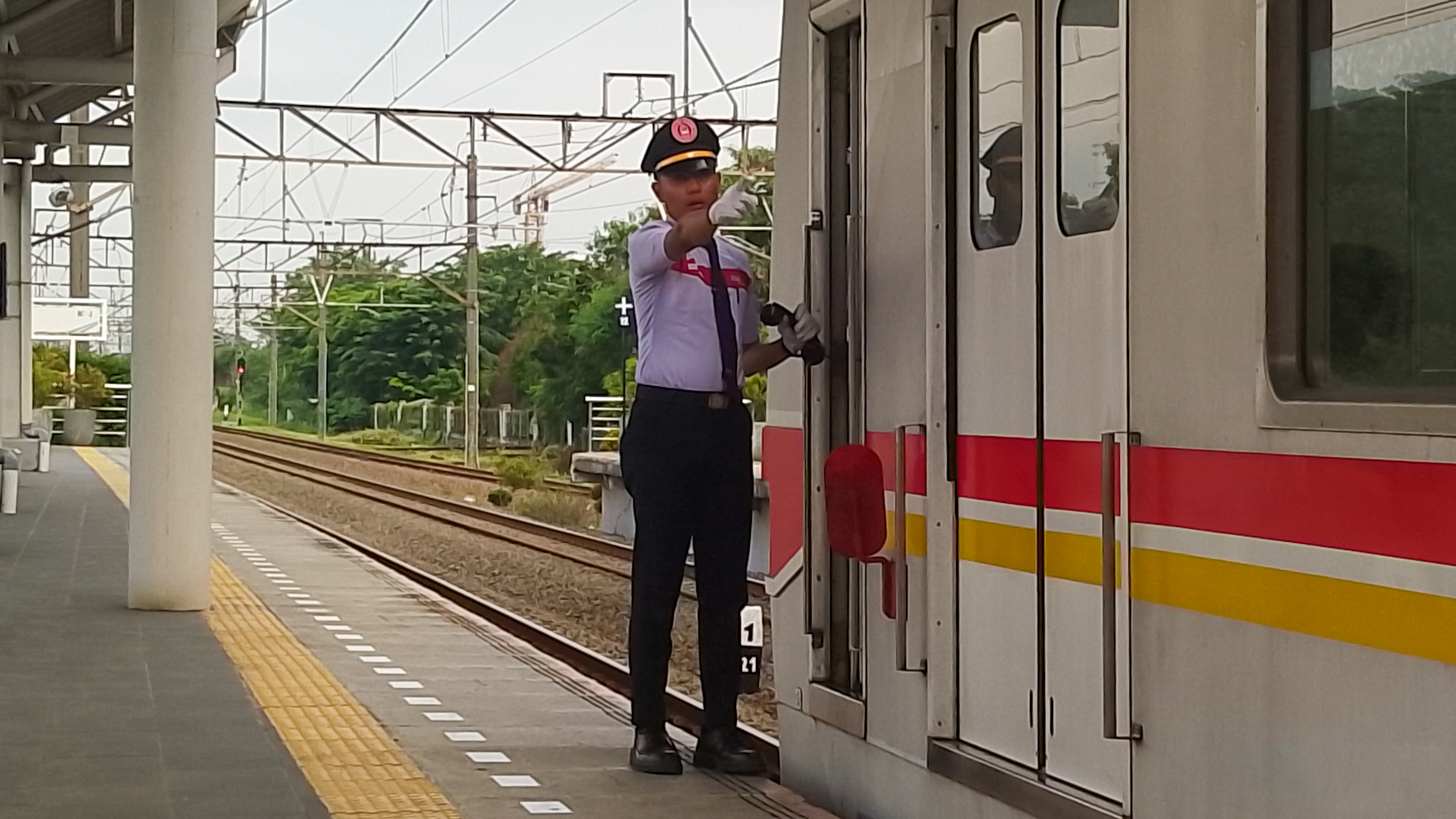
A KAI Commuter conductor pointing and calling after closing the train door at Cakung station.

The method is widely used in Asian countries, especially in dangerous works such as elevator maintenance and railway operations. The Chinese variant became much more complex including pointing (using both forefinger and middle finger instead of forefinger-only as in Japan, and used when checking signals, doors, speed and other major aspects) and caution (bending the right elbow by 90° and lifting the forearm upright, used when a checking procedure is finished or caution signals).

The method is also widely used in Taiwan by the Taiwan High Speed Rail, Taiwan Railways Administration, on the one-person operated high-capacity lines of the Taipei Metro, Kaohsiung Metro and Taoyuan Airport MRT, and since 2014, also on the Taipei Joint Bus System.

The method is also used in Indonesia by national rail operator Kereta Api Indonesia and its subsidiary (KAI Commuter and KAI Bandara) following the company's reform in 2015, and also by newer regional rail operators such as Jakarta MRT and Jakarta LRT.

== North America ==
=== New York City ===
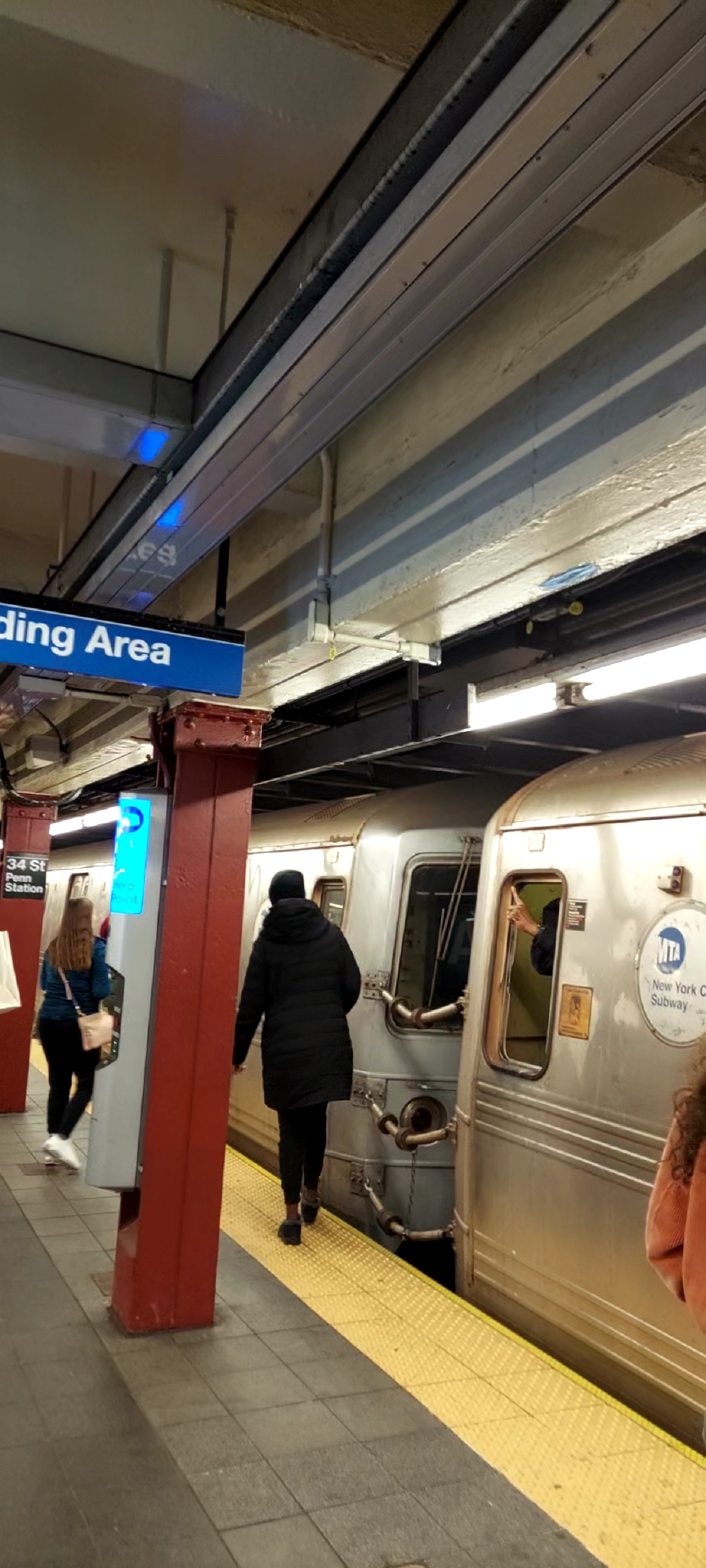
A New York City Subway conductor points at a "zebra board" at 34th Street-Penn Station.

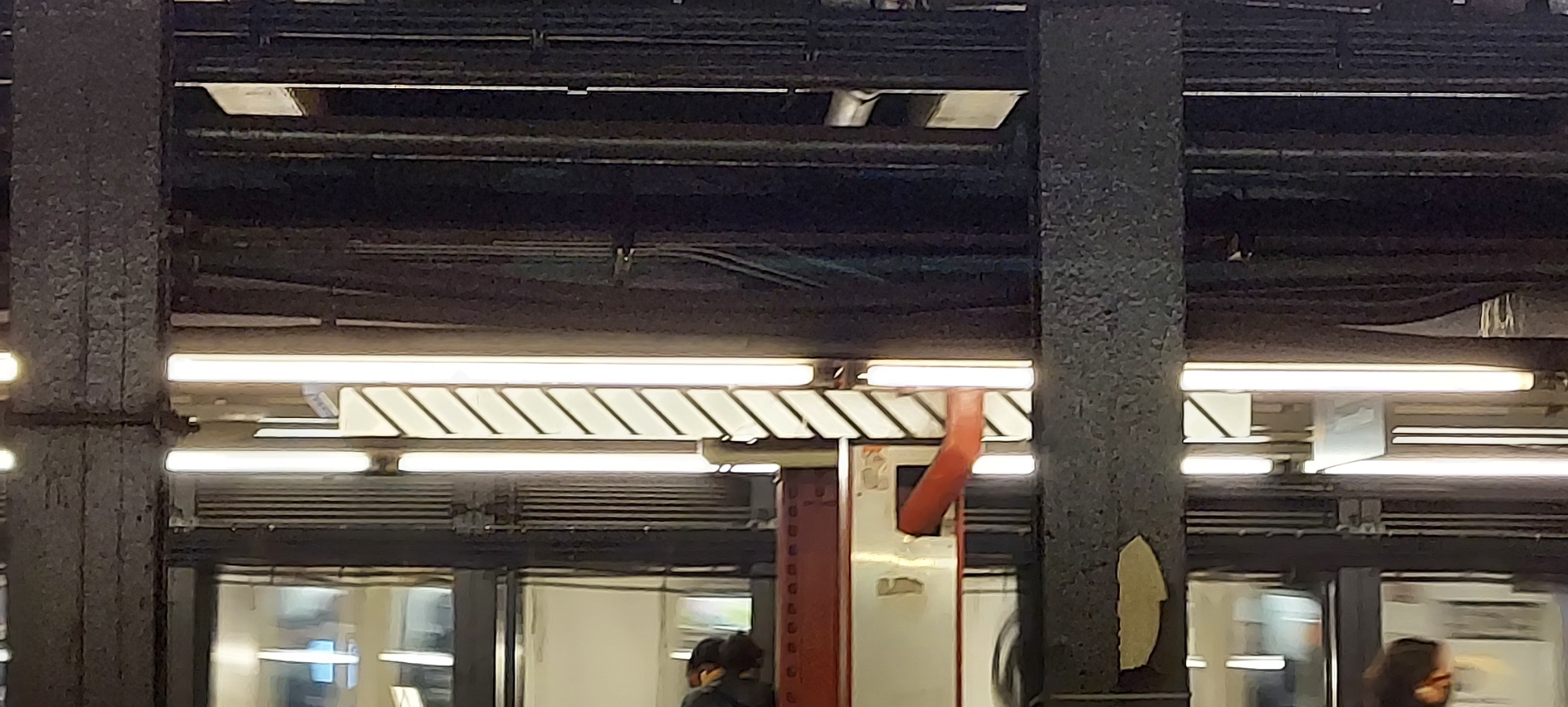
A zebra board used on the New York City Subway. Upon arriving, the conductor is required to point at the board prior to opening the doors.

In the New York City Subway, before opening the train doors, subway conductors are required to point to a black-and-white striped board located opposite of the conductor's window every time when a train pulls into a station. The boards are located at the middle of the platform such that when the conductor can see the sign, both ends of the train have reached the platform and it is safe to open the train doors. The procedure was implemented in 1996 after a series of incidents where doors opened in the tunnel. The procedure shows that the conductor is paying attention. If the conductor cannot see the striped board, they are not permitted to open the doors.

=== Toronto ===
In the Toronto subway, before opening the train doors, subway guards are required to point to a green triangle installed on the platform wall opposite of the conductor's window every time when a train pulls into a station. The procedure was implemented after a series of incidents where conductors opened the doors on the wrong side of the train. The procedure is used to focus the conductor's attention.

Streetcar operators are required to confirm track switch alignments by stopping at a switch, pointing to the switch with their index finger, and then proceeding. This is done to focus the operator's attention to ensure that the streetcar does not go to a different route.

GO Transit adopted the practice in March 2021. Upon entering a station, but before opening the doors, the Customer Service Ambassador (CSA) is required to point towards both ends of the train and announce that the platform is clear as a way to confirm that the train is stopped properly. After the CSA closes the doors, the same process is repeated to confirm that nobody is caught in the doors. According to Metrolinx, incorporating the pointing and calling procedure within GO Transit's daily operations is an important way to enhance safety, "especially as the transit agency gets ready to launch the largest expansion of GO service in its history".

== Effectiveness ==
A 1994 study by the Railway Technical Research Institute showed that pointing and calling reduced mistakes by almost 85 percent when doing a simple task.
