= Via Toronto Maintenance Centre =

Canadian passenger rail yard

Toronto Maintenance Centre
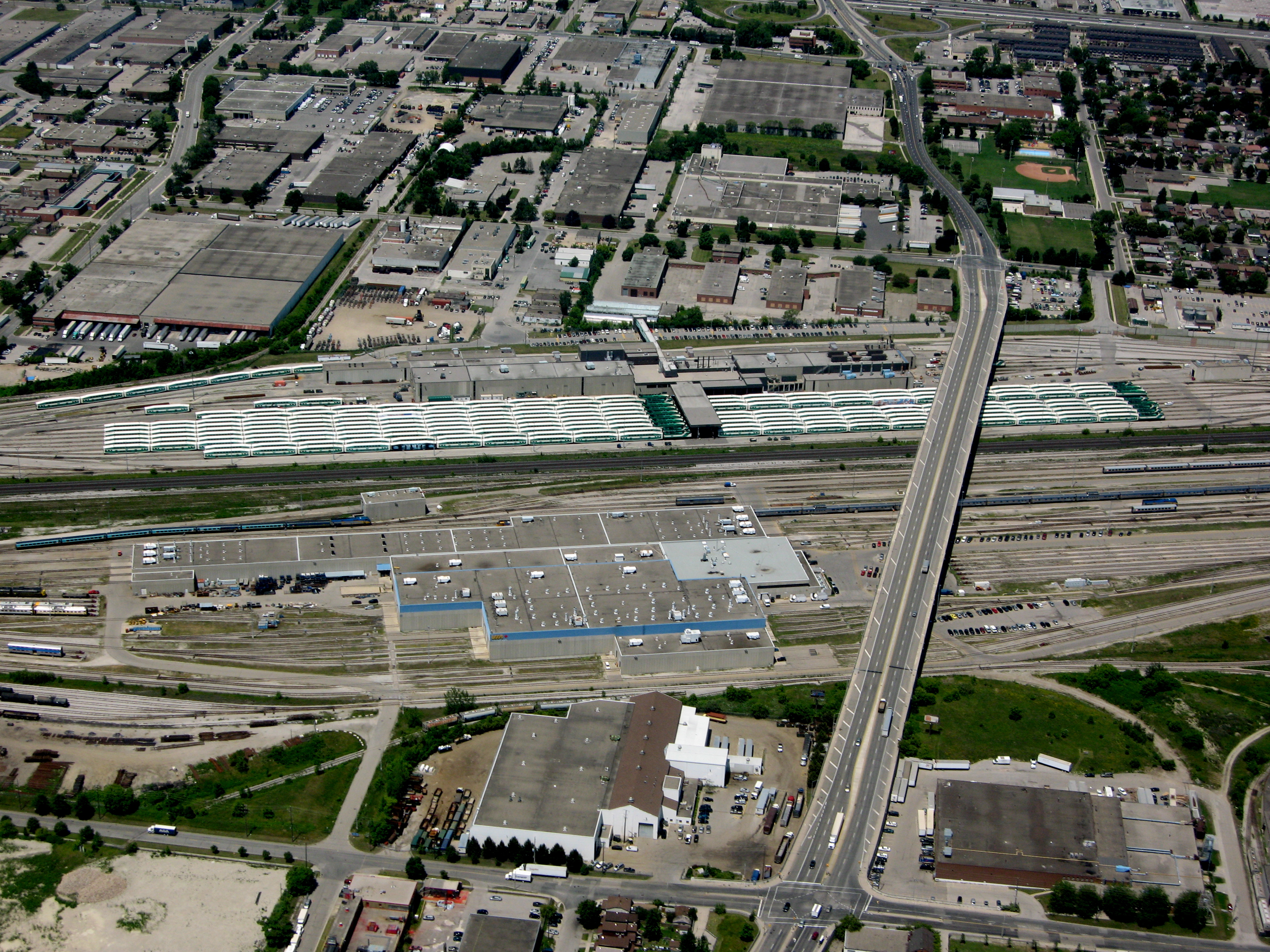
- Toronto Maintenance Centre closer to the camera (blue stripe). The large road running across the yard is Islington Ave.

General information
- Location: 50 Drummond Street; Canada
- Coordinates: 43°36′38″N 79°30′34″W
- Owner: Via Rail

Construction
- Structure type: Rail yard and locomotive and coach maintenance facility

History
- Former names: Canadian National
Location

Via Rail's Toronto Maintenance Centre is a railway yard in the western end of Toronto, which stores and services Via trains. It lies within the south side of the former Canadian National Mimico Yard directly opposite of the Willowbrook Rail Maintenance Facility on the north side; GO Transit's Lakeshore West line separates the two facilities. The yard is bisected by the Islington Avenue flyover bridge. Its main entrance is located at 50 Drummond Street on the eastern side with a secondary entrance on its southern side along New Toronto Street at Eighth Street.

The west end of the yard has an operational railway turntable. A large turnaround wye has been constructed out of an industrial spur on the eastern side that formerly served the Campbell Soup Company plant.

In 1976, Via Rail took over the passenger services of both Canadian National and Canadian Pacific. Originally, Via performed maintenance in Toronto at the CNR Spadina Roundhouse and CPR John Street Roundhouse, both just west of Union Station. In 1985, Via moved to its current maintenance facility in the southern half of Mimico Yard.

In 2022, Via demonstrated for Trains magazine the locomotive simulator in the centre's training complex.

== Mimico Yard ==
Both the Via Toronto Maintenance Centre and GO Transit's Willowbrook Rail Maintenance Facility lie in south and north halves respectively of the Mimico Yard. The northern part of the yard is also called the Willowbrook Yard after the nearby Willowbrook Road. CN had continued to maintain a small part of Mimico Yard to the southwest for local freight operations.

In 1906, the Grand Trunk Railway built the 200-acre (81 ha) Mimico Yard. In 1913, the GTR built a 34-stall roundhouse, a coaling tower and water towers on the south side of the yard. The yard exclusively serviced freight trains, and had facilities to maintain and repair freight cars. Freight trains were assembled and dispatched from the yard. Unlike today, the mainline ran along the north edge of the Mimico Yard.

In 1923, the Canadian National (CN) took over the yard along with the Grand Trunk Railway. Mimico Yard became CN's main freight yard in the Toronto area. In 1965, CN moved most of the yard's functions to the then-new MacMillan Yard (originally called Toronto Yard) in Maple, Ontario, as part of their "Toronto Bypass" project to divert freight traffic out of and around the busy Toronto area. This allowed GO Transit both yard space and track capacity to begin its commuter service. The Oakville Subdivision mainline that once ran around the north end of the yard was rerouted through the middle of the yard in the mid-1960's.

The Mimico Roundhouse survived into the diesel area, but part of it was rented out to tenants. In March 1965, a fire partly destroyed the roundhouse with the remainder being demolished by 1969. Today, a turntable sits near the site of the former roundhouse, but it was built years after the roundhouse's demolition, and not in the same location as CN's. The nearby coal tower for steam locomotives survived into the 1980's. Other CN facilities that existed at Mimico Yard were an ice house with icing platforms for refrigerator loads, a long freight shed for Less-Than-Carload freight loading, and a piggyback terminal. CN had its own Mimico Station at the east end of the yard, but its use was discontinued in favour of a new Mimico GO Station.

GO Transit started using the north end of Mimico Yard in 1967 as its main passenger train servicing facility, and in 1978 opened its Willowbrook Rail Maintenance Facility in the Willowbrook Yard, the name given to the northern half of the Mimico Yard. In 1985, Via Rail opened its Toronto Maintenance Centre in the southern half of the yard. By this time, the mainline was running through the middle of the Mimico Yard, separating the GO Transit and Via Rail facilities.
