= Whitby Rail Maintenance Facility =

Canadian rolling stock maintenance facility

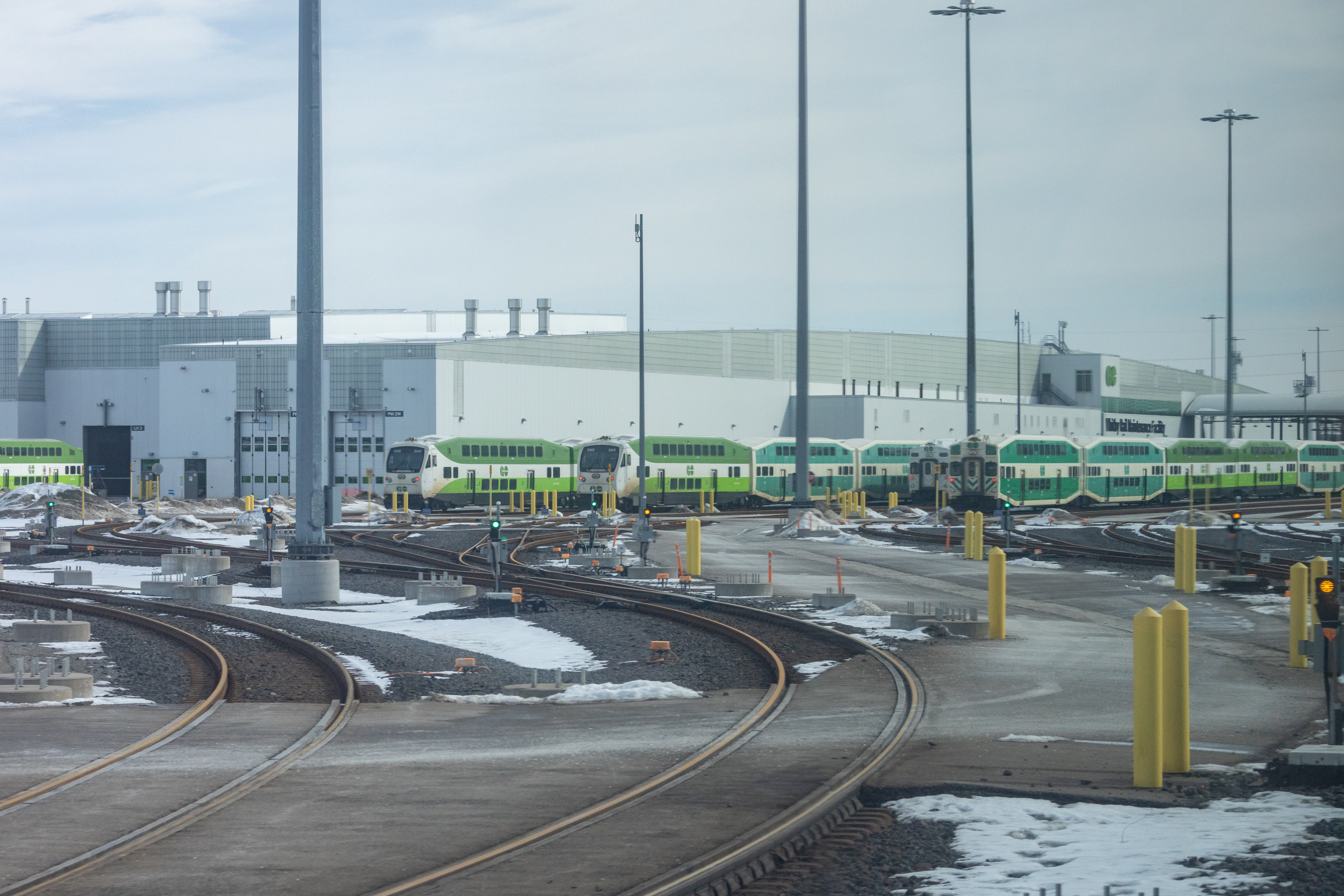
- Facility seen from GO Train in 2026

General information
- Location: 625 Victoria Street East, Whitby, Ontario; Canada
- Coordinates: 43.8639°N 78.9181°W
- Owner: Metrolinx

Construction
- Structure type: Rail yard and locomotive and coach maintenance facility

History
- Opened: 2018
Location

The Whitby Rail Maintenance Facility is a GO Transit rolling stock maintenance facility in Whitby, Ontario, Canada. The depot lies between Victoria Street East and GO Transit's Lakeshore East line just east of South Blair Street. It is a secondary depot, the primary depot being the Willowbrook Rail Maintenance Facility along GO Transit's Lakeshore West line.

Plenary Infrastructure, a consortium, is responsible for maintenance and repairs to the facility under a 30-year contract. Alstom maintains rolling stock within the facility. Metrolinx owns the facility.

== History ==
In its planning stage, the depot was originally called East Rail Maintenance Facility, but by opening day became known as the Whitby Rail Maintenance Facility. By 2015, the consortium Plenary Infrastructure was awarded a $859.2-million contract to design, build and finance the facility, and maintain it for 30 years. Of the $859.2-million contract cost, the Province of Ontario contributed $764.4 million and the federal government $94.8 million. Construction started in the summer of 2012 with Construction Substantial Completion awarded on March 14, 2018.

The depot will support GO Transit Regional Express Rail, offering faster, more frequent commuter train service across the Greater Toronto Region. Another reason for building the Whitby Rail Maintenance Facility was to reduce the operational risk of having only one depot. It provides operational flexibility under emergency situations in case there are operational issues at the Willowbrook Rail Maintenance Facility).

== Facilities ==
The Whitby Rail Maintenance Facility has capacity to accommodate 22 twelve-car trains but was expected to house only 13 upon its opening. It provides mechanical maintenance, body repair, as well as daily cleaning and operational services. It is designed to support 30 years of future service expansion as well as the future electrification of GO Transit rail lines. The facility requires 300 to 400 workers.

The 46,000 m^{2} (500,000 ft^{2}) site has the following features:

- Shop area in the main building of about 19,000 m^{2} (200,000 ft^{2})
- 13 on-site storage bays for 12-car passenger trains:
  - 2 preventative maintenance bays
  - 11 canopy tracks for storage
- 11 bays for locomotive repair
- 12 bays for coach repair
- Dedicated buildings for paint shop, locomotive wash, track maintenance, passenger train wash, and wheel shop
- Administrative offices with crew centre in the main building
- Over 21 km (13 mi) of track
- 68 train switches

The facility has Gold Certification for Leadership in Energy and Environmental Design (LEED). Environmental features include:

- Reflective roof materials to limit solar radiation
- Natural lighting throughout the main building
- Rainwater collection for wash stations and washrooms
- Diversion and storage of rainwater
- Electric automobile charging stations, dedicated car pool parking area
