= Willowbrook Rail Maintenance Facility =

Rolling stock maintenance facility in Toronto, Canada

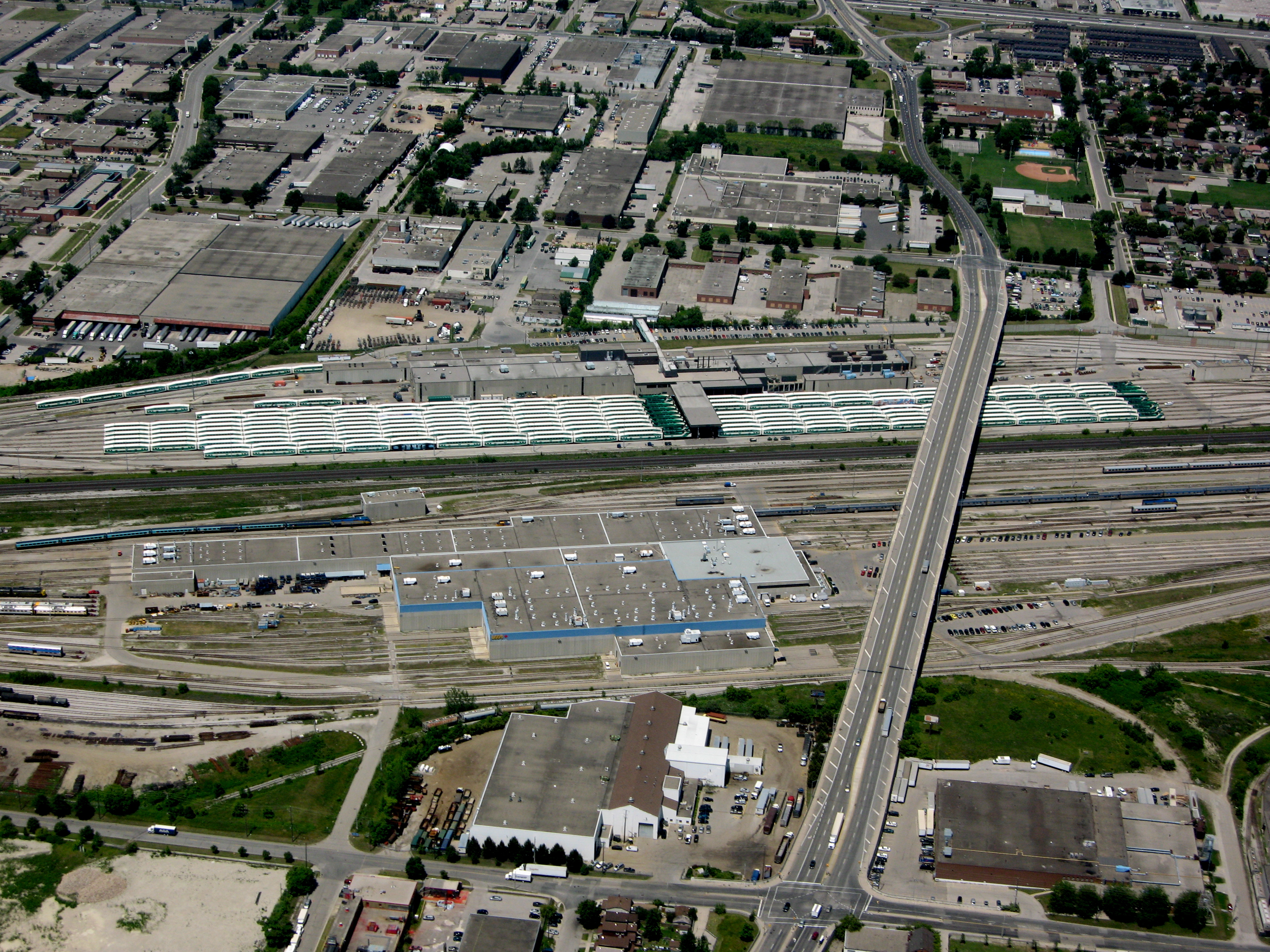
- GO Transit facility at the top and Via Rail facility below

General information
- Location: 125 Judson Street, Toronto, Ontario; Canada
- Coordinates: 43°36′38″N 79°30′34″W
- Owner: Metrolinx

Construction
- Structure type: Rail yard and locomotive and coach maintenance facility

History
- Former names: Canadian National Railway
Location

The Willowbrook Rail Maintenance Facility is a GO Transit rolling stock maintenance facility located in the Willowbrook Yard in Toronto, Canada. The facility is west of Mimico station and is across the main tracks from the VIA Rail Toronto Maintenance Facility.

Alstom performs train maintenance at the facility on behalf of Metrolinx, the owner of GO Transit.

== History ==
The Grand Trunk Railway created the Mimico Yard in 1910 west of its Mimico station on the west side of Royal York Road. The yard had a locomotive roundhouse and facilities to maintain and repair freight cars. Freight trains were assembled and dispatched from the yard. In 1923, the Canadian National Railway (CN) took over the yard along with the Grand Trunk Railway. In 1965, CN moved most of the yard's functions to the then-new MacMillan Yard in Maple, Ontario. In the mid-1960s, GO Transit was looking for a site to store and maintain its commuter trains. Thus, GO Transit subsequently acquired the portion of the Mimico Yard on the north side of the mainline passing through it. (Via Rail acquired the portion south of the mainline for its Toronto Maintenance Facility.) Since the GO Transit yard was near Willowbrook Road, the yard was named the Willowbrook Yard. The Mimico station building was taken over as a dispatching office and crew facilities, and a new Mimico GO Station was constructed on the east side of Royal York Road.

In September 1978, work started to construct the $17-million Willowbrook Rail Maintenance Facility. The depot officially opened on November 7, 1980.

By April 2021, GO Transit had installed 2.6 kilometres (1.6 mi) of guard rails and warning lines along the roof edges of the seven buildings at the depot. These were to protect workers who maintain heating, ventilation, and air conditioning (HVAC) units and other electrical and mechanical equipment mounted on the roofs. HVAC units run 24/7 and keep the air in buildings clean and safe for workers such as for those working near locomotive engines.

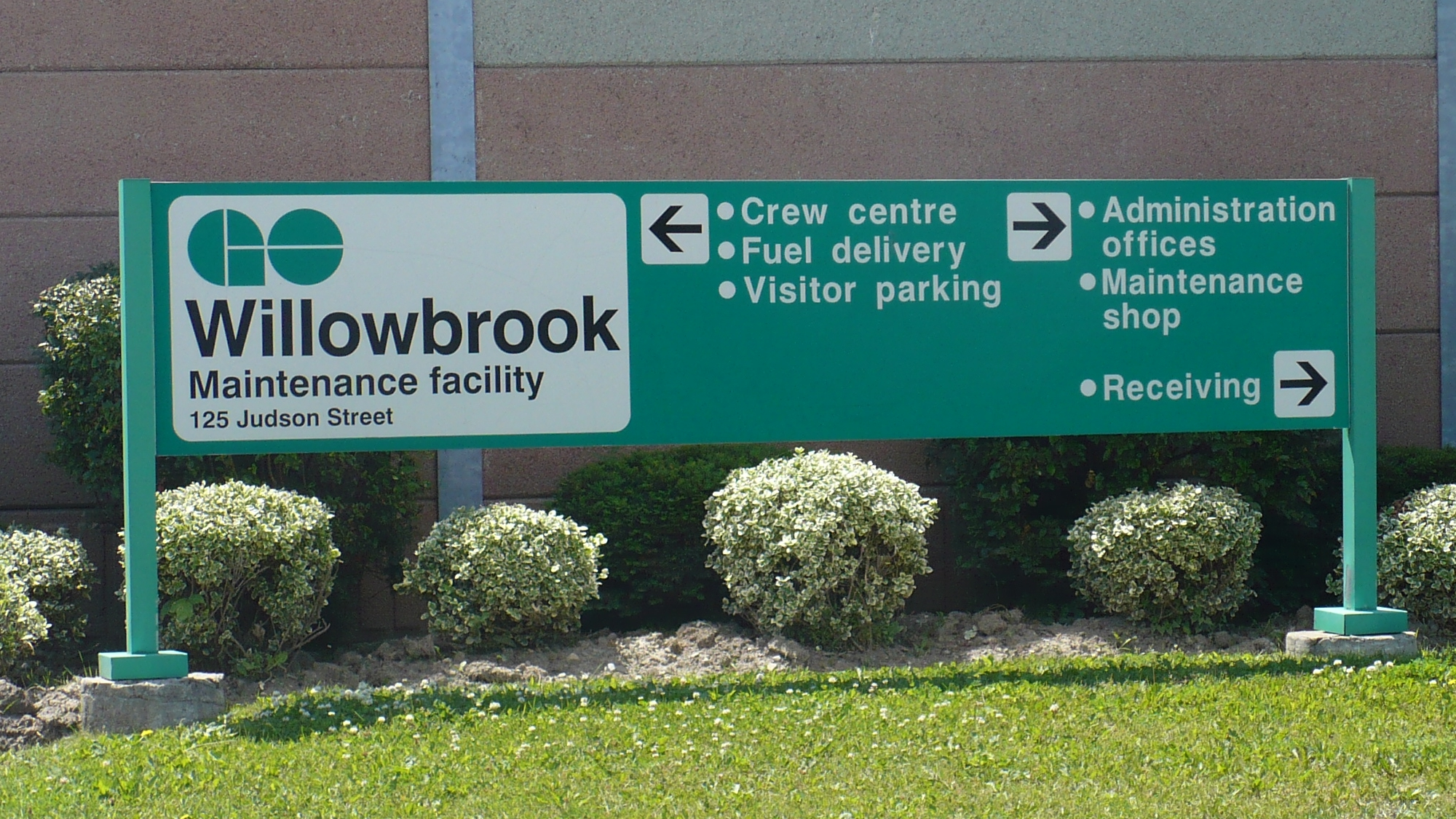
Sign at the yard entrance

== Facilities ==
The Willowbrook Rail Maintenance Facility is located on a 18,600 m^{2} (200,000 ft^{2}) site and features:

- 12,000 m^{2} (130,000 ft^{2}) service and maintenance building
- Diesel shop for maintaining four to six locomotives
- Coach shop with a drop pit to lower vehicles for ease of maintenance
- Semi-automatic wash bay designed to handle tall passenger coaches
- Bay for regulatory inspections and preventative maintenance, performed on an eight-day cycle.
- Control centre
- General administration office
- Fuelling station for up to four locomotives filling at a rate of 200 gallons a minute
- Storage yard for 21 trains

As of 2021, the depot works around the clock to service, clean and fuel 28 trains each day.

== See also ==
- Whitby Rail Maintenance Facility, another GO Transit maintenance facility
