= Bloomington GO Station =

Commuter rail terminus of the Richmond Hill line in the Greater Toronto Area

Bloomington
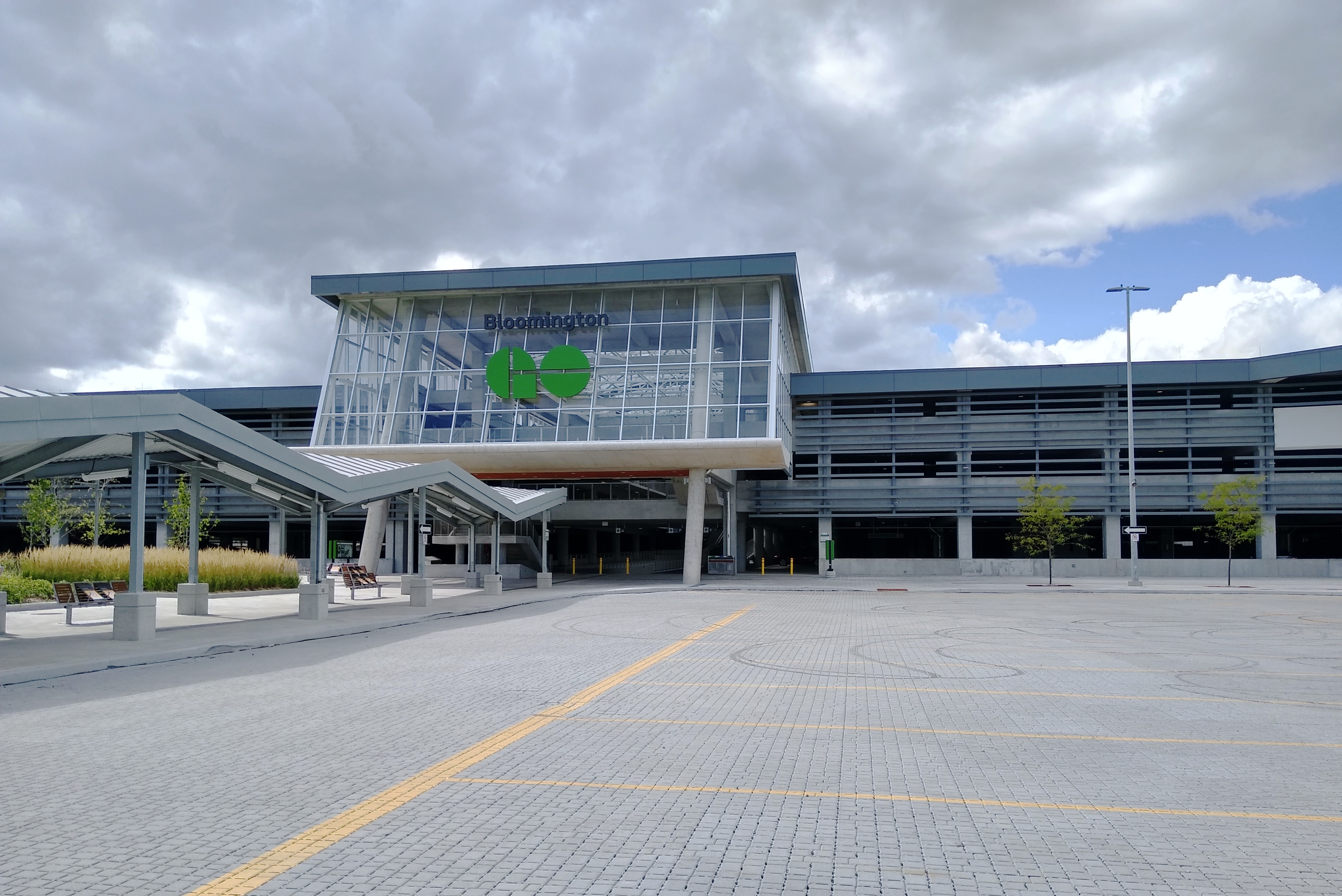
- Bloomington station entrance in 2021

General information
- Location: 1796 Bloomington Road; Richmond Hill, Ontario
- Coordinates: 43°58′33″N 79°23′50″W
- Owner: Metrolinx
- Platforms: 1 side platform
- Tracks: 3
- Bus routes: 61 67

Construction
- Parking: 998 spaces
- Cycle facilities: Bike shelters with platform access

Other information
- Station code: GO Transit: BM
- Fare zone: 98

History
- Opened: June 28, 2021

Services
Preceding station	GO Transit	Following station
Gormley towards Union	Richmond Hill	Terminus
Location

Bloomington GO Station is a train and bus station in the GO Transit network, located in the extreme northeast corner of Richmond Hill, Ontario. The station primarily serves the community of Oak Ridges and the town of Whitchurch–Stouffville. It is the northern terminus of the Richmond Hill line train service, which connects to Union Station in Toronto. The station opened to the public on June 28, 2021.

Construction of the station began in March 2017, a few months after the completion of the Gormley GO Station, which opened in December 2016. The station site cost an estimated $82.4 million to develop (the final cost was unconfirmed publicly), and the multi-level parking structure and integrated station building was built to satisfy LEED Gold certification.

== Station facilities ==
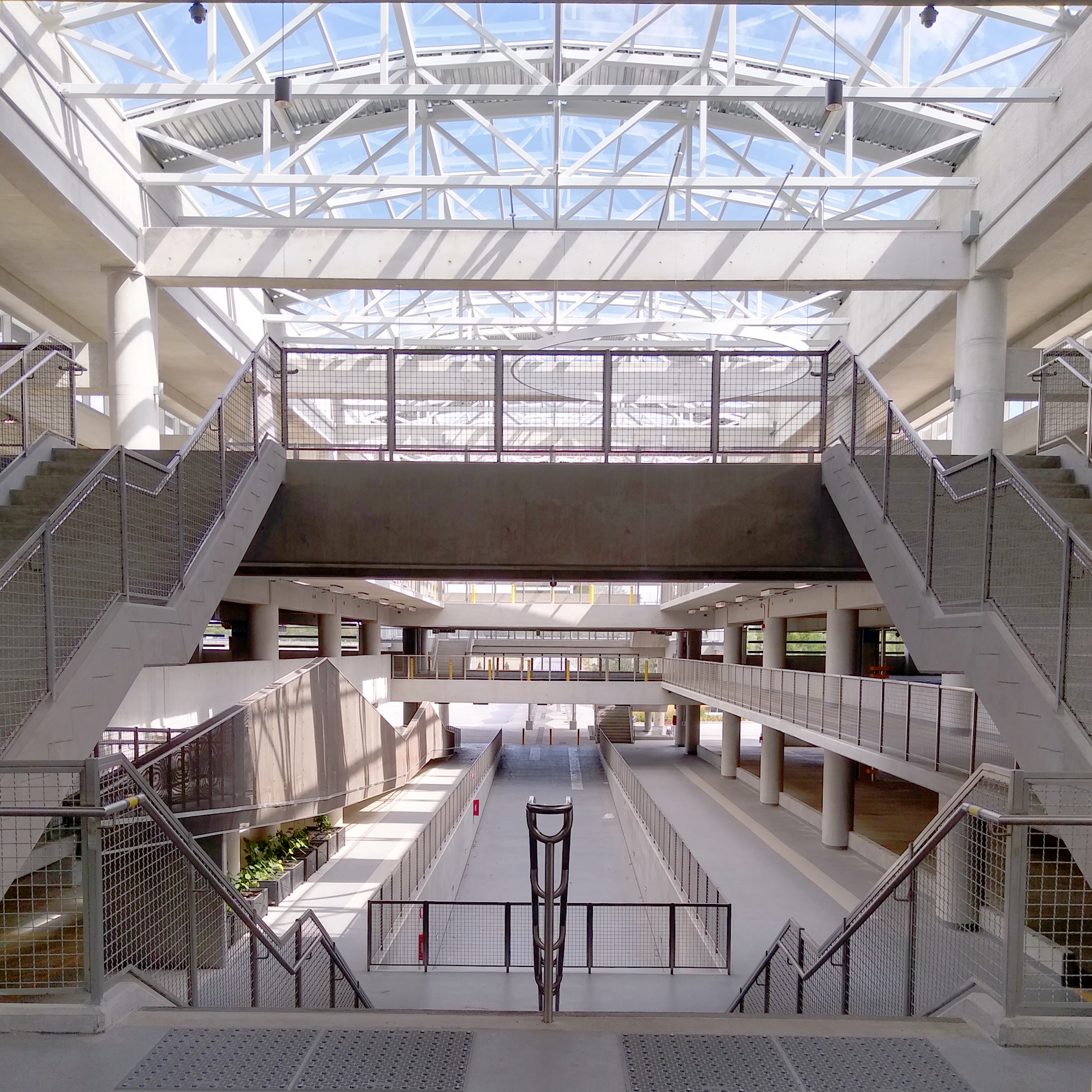
The parking garage includes a large open atrium

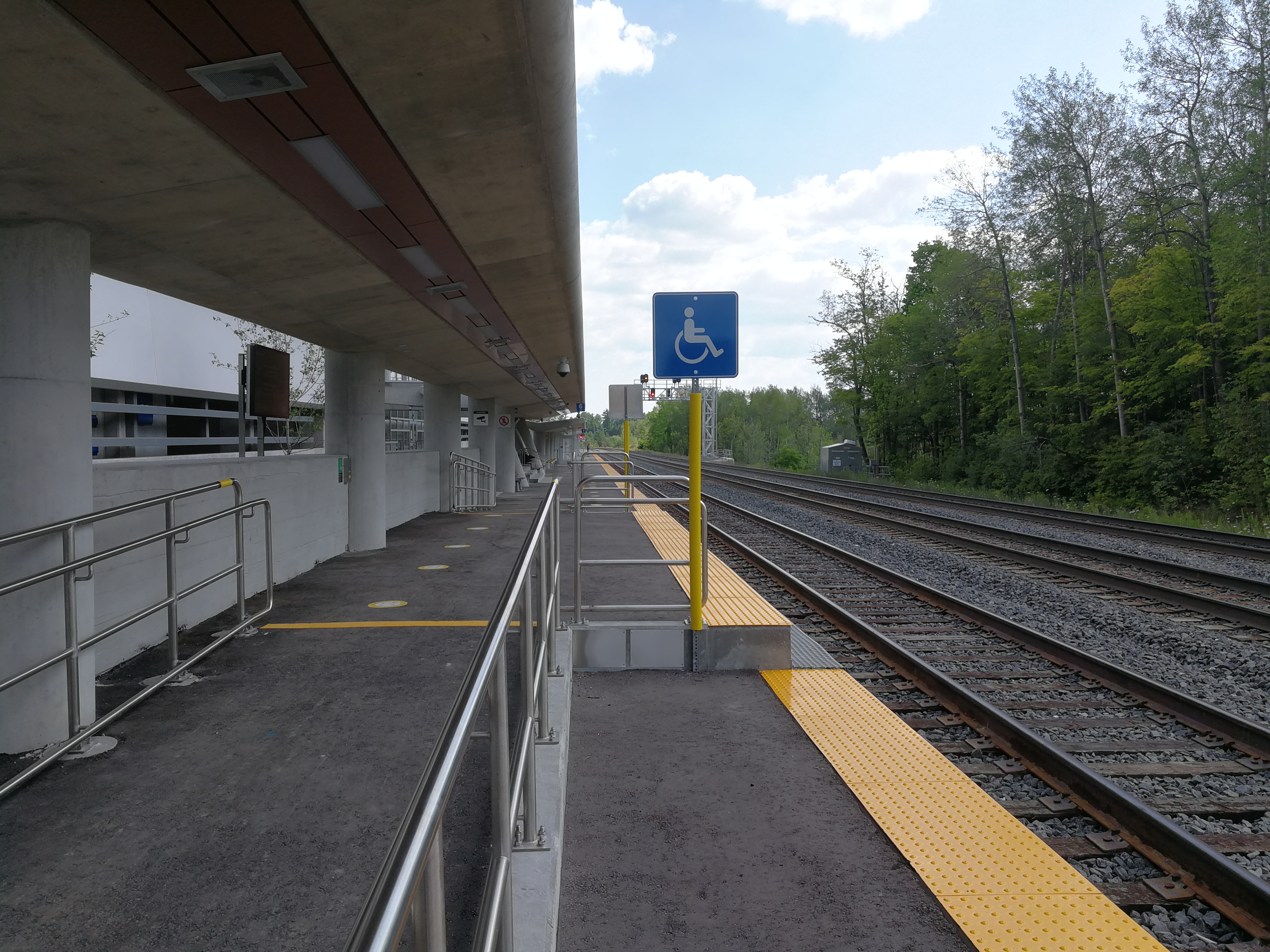
Station platform

The station is located on the south side of Bloomington Road (York Regional Road 40) on the east side of the Canadian National Railway line and west of Highway 404. It consists of a single platform, building, bus loop, kiss and ride, and 998 parking spaces, 760 of which are in a 3-level parking garage. Land is reserved for a future carpool parking lot managed by the Ministry of Transportation of Ontario.

== Service ==
As of September 2021, Bloomington GO is served by four round trips per weekday; all Toronto-bound during the morning and returning northbound during the afternoon. Additional weekday service to Toronto is provided by the 61 GO bus.
