= Gormley GO Station =

Railway station in Richmond Hill, Ontario, Canada

Gormley
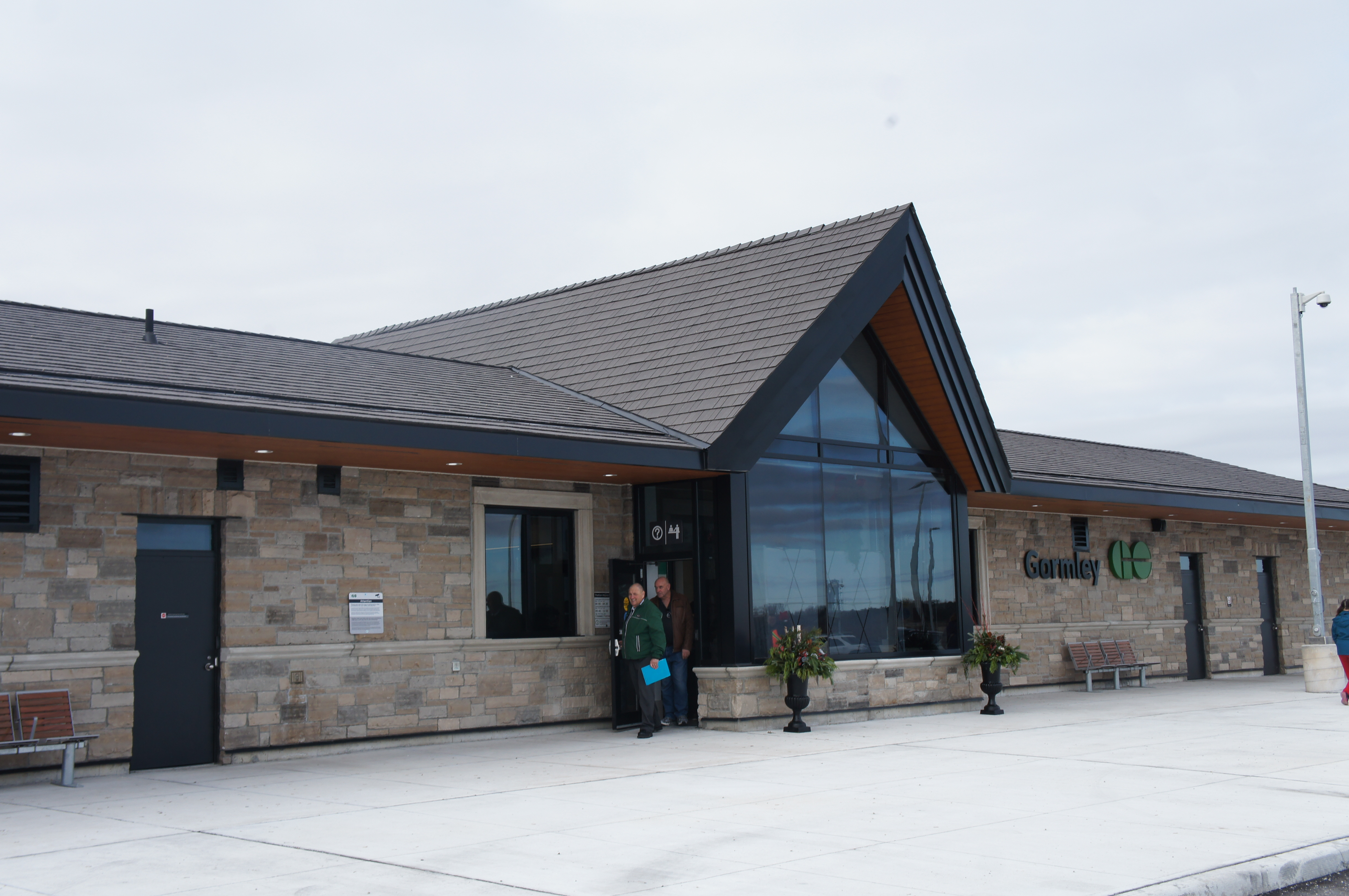
- Gormley station building

General information
- Location: 1650 Stouffville Road; Richmond Hill, Ontario; Canada
- Coordinates: 43°56′25″N 79°23′54″W
- Owner: Metrolinx
- Platforms: 1 side platform
- Tracks: 2
- Bus routes: 61
- Connections: York Region Transit (via Richmond Hill and Honda Blvd)

Construction
- Structure type: At-grade
- Parking: 850 spaces

Other information
- Station code: GO Transit: GO
- Fare zone: 78

History
- Opened: December 5, 2016

Services
Preceding station	GO Transit	Following station
Richmond Hill towards Union	Richmond Hill	Bloomington Terminus
Preceding station	Ontario Northland Railway	Following station
Washago toward Cochrane	Northlander (reopening Dec. 10, 2026)	Langstaff toward Toronto
Former services at CN station
Preceding station	Canadian National Railway	Following station
Richmond Hill toward Toronto	Capreol – Toronto	Vandorf toward Capreol
Location

Gormley station is a train and bus station in the GO Transit network located in Richmond Hill, Ontario, Canada, serving Oak Ridges and the Whitchurch–Stouffville community of Gormley. It was the terminus of the Richmond Hill line train service from when it opened on 5 December 2016 until 28 June 2021, when the line was extended north to Bloomington GO Station. It is planned to serve the Northlander when service resumes in late 2026.

The station is located on the north side of Stouffville Road (York Regional Road 14) on the east side of the railway, west of Highway 404. It features a single platform with heated shelters and a snow-melting system, a station building, a bus loop, a kiss and ride and 850 car parking spaces. The station building has a Leadership in Energy and Environmental Design (LEED) Silver certification.

== History ==
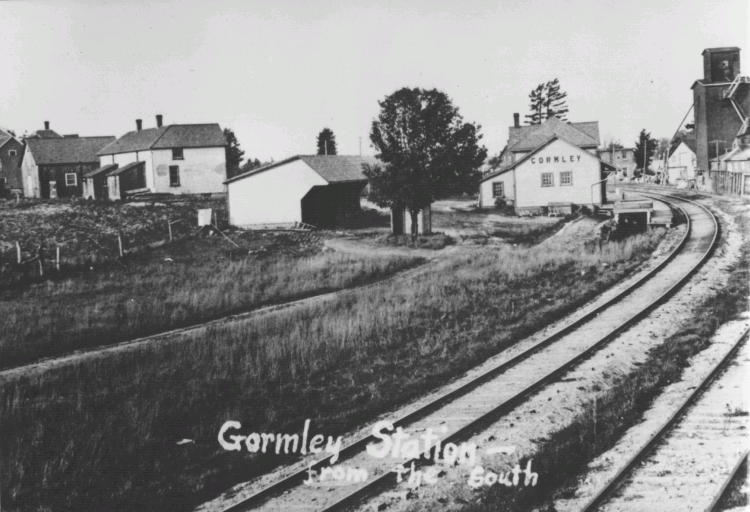
Historic Gormley station viewed from the south in the early twentieth century

=== Historic Gormley station ===
In 1907, a two-storey station was built by the James Bay Railway, south of the original Stouffville Sideroad. The name of the company changed to the Canadian Northern Ontario Railway, and later to the Canadian Northern Railway, and was ultimately merged into the Canadian National Railway in 1923.

The Gormley railway station was demolished in the early 1970s. Station Road, which once led to station, is now a narrow dead-end street that gives access to a few homes and businesses from Gormley Road.

=== Gormley GO Station ===
The Gormley GO Station was constructed north of Stouffville Road, approximately 600 metres (2,000 ft) north of the site of the historic train station. A ribbon-cutting ceremony for the station was held on 1 December 2016, and regular service began on 5 December 2016.

Construction of the station and its building cost approximately CA$22 million. The station's construction was originally delayed due to environmental concerns and started in 2014. A nearby layover train storage facility with capacity of six trains was built simultaneously and cost about CA$85 million. The layover facility opened in 2014.

== Services ==
As of April 2024, Gormley Station is served by four southbound train trips to Union Station on weekday mornings, and five northbound trips returning northbound on weekday evenings. A handful of additional trips between Gormley and Union Station are operated by GO Transit bus route 61 outside of peak periods.

Service on the Northlander is expected to resume on December 10, 2026.

== Transit connections ==
Starting 28 April 2024, a new on-request service is being offered from Gormley GO station that provides connection to York Region Transit routes 24 Woodbine and 90 Leslie, as well as the adjacent service area in Gormley. The service will be available weekdays between 6 am and 9 am, as well as between 4 pm and 8 pm, and can be booked using the YRT On-Request App.
