= Mimico GO Station =

Railway station in Toronto, Ontario, Canada

Mimico
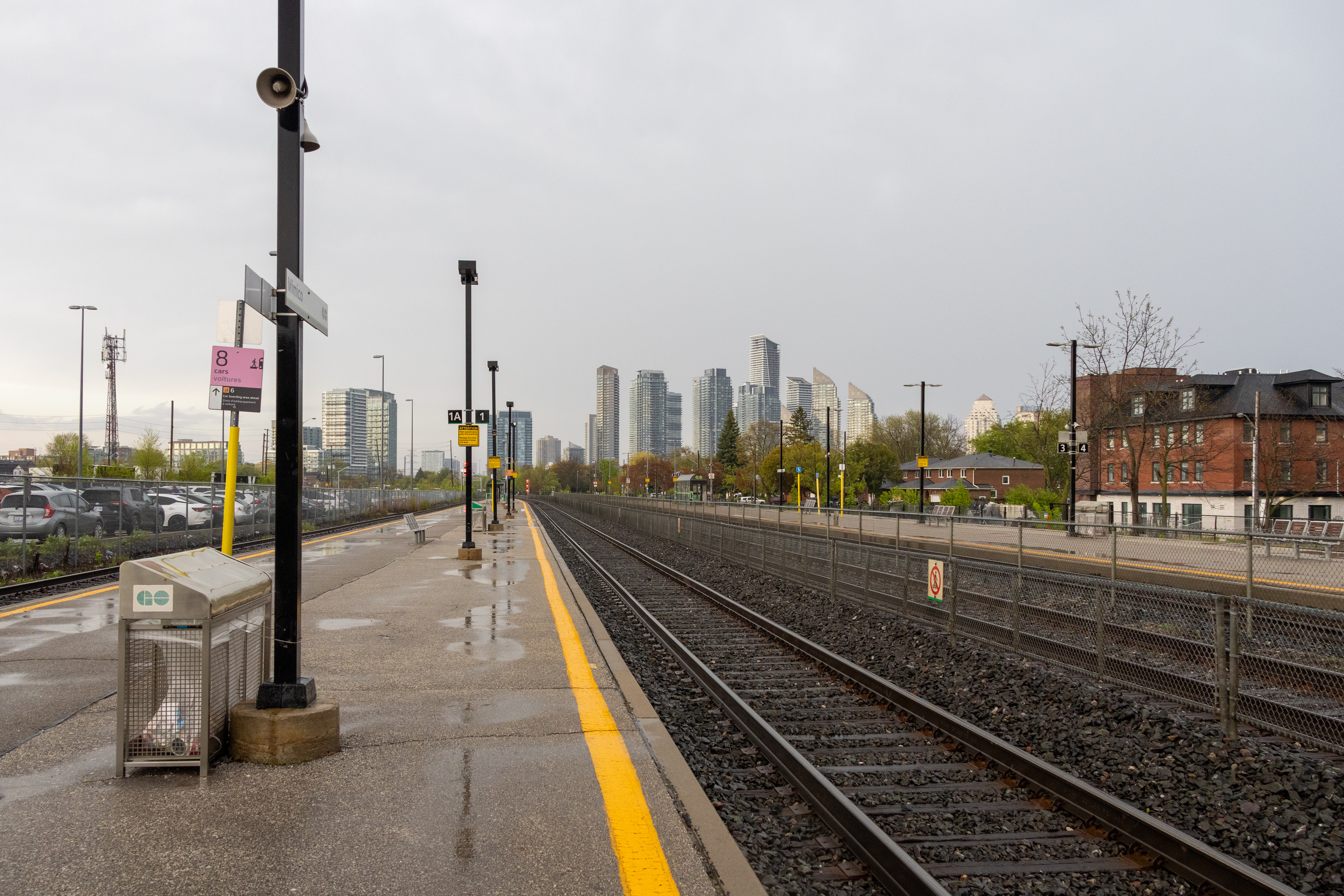
- Mimico platforms in 2026

General information
- Location: 315 Royal York Road; Toronto, Ontario
- Coordinates: 43°36′59″N 79°29′50″W
- Owner: Metrolinx
- Platforms: 1 island platform 1 side platform
- Tracks: 3
- Connections: TTC buses: 76, 176

Construction
- Parking: 259 spaces (+ 71 temporary)
- Cycle facilities: rack
- Accessible: No

Other information
- Station code: GO Transit: MI
- Fare zone: 79

History
- Opened: May 23, 1967; 59 years ago (as a GO station)
- Electrified: September 2035; 8 years' time (planned)

Passengers
- 2019: 433,000

Services
Preceding station	GO Transit	Following station
Long Branch towards Confederation	Lakeshore West	Exhibition towards Union
Former services
Preceding station	Canadian National Railway	Following station
Long Branch toward Suspension Bridge	Niagara Falls – Toronto; Local stops	Sunnyside toward Toronto
Location

Mimico GO Station is a railway station in the GO Transit network located in the Etobicoke area of Toronto, Ontario, Canada. It is a stop on the Lakeshore West line train service, serving the Mimico neighbourhood.

The small station building is situated north of the tracks on the east side of Royal York Road. The building is connected by a tunnel under the tracks and stairs to the platforms, which are therefore not wheelchair accessible. There is an additional bypass track which runs between the platforms and another two tracks on the south side, which access the Willowbrook Rail Maintenance Facility.

This station and Long Branch are the only two stations on the Lakeshore West line which are not fully accessible.

== History ==
It was the building of the first railway in Ontario in the 1850s between Hamilton and Toronto through what would become the Town of Mimico that led to the first plan for a town at this location. A Mimico Station was built on the north side of the tracks just south of Mimico's Christ Church (the first church in Etobicoke) on the east side of Church St (Royal York) at the end of Windsor Street. This development meant the name Mimico became more associated with the area where the railway crossed the Mimico Creek to its station on Church St (Royal York) rather than the former Mimico at the Mimico Creek and the early Highway; Dundas. Nevertheless, the 1856 subdivision plan for Mimico largely failed and it was after the more successful 1890 plan for a Town at Mimico the 'old' Mimico Railway Station building, constructed by the Grand Trunk Railway was built in 1916 as well as the Windsor Hotel (Blue Goose Tavern). With the creation of the Government of Ontario's regional train GO service a new station was constructed on the site of the original 1856 Mimico Station, north of the tracks on the east side of Royal York just south of Christ Church. The 1916 Mimico Station deteriorated and was close to demolition when it was saved by community volunteers and moved to a new permanent location in Coronation Park at the northwest corner of Judson St and Royal York Rd in 2007. The building is now being restored with the intention of converting it into a local museum.

The current GO station was built in 1967 when GO train service first started along the line. A modernization project began in August 2013 and was completed by 2018. It included the expansion of the platforms to fit 12-car trains, an expanded parking area, a pedestrian tunnel to Manchester Street, and a new station building.

By April 2022, Metrolinx and Vandyk Properties had signed an agreement to build a new Mimico GO Station along with an adjacent Transit Oriented Community. (However, by January 2024, Vandyk's residential development project near Mimico GO went into receivership.) The new station would have featured:

- A new, accessible main station building
- A new secondary entrance building with tunnel access
- 300 underground parking spaces
- Covered storage space for 96 bicycles
- A plaza with a pick-up and drop-off area
- A new station access path for pedestrians and cyclists

== Connecting transit ==
The Toronto Transit Commission's 76 Royal York South bus route operates along Royal York Road close to the station, linking it to Royal York subway station in the north and the 507 Long Branch streetcar route to the south. On June 25, 2018, the TTC started operating 176 Mimico GO bus service on a one way loop between the Lake Shore bus loop (Park Lawn Road) and Mimico GO Station every 30 minutes, which meets with GO train trips during peak periods.
