= Achim Zeman =

German painter

- Born: 1961 (age 64–65); Stuttgart, Baden-Württemberg, Germany
- Known for: Abstract Painting, Concrete art
- Movement: Installation art

Achim Zeman (born 1961 in Stuttgart) is a German painter and installation artist. He is known for his extensive spatial installations that stretch across walls and floors and challenge our perception: "Verunsicherung der Betrachterposition, Irritation des Raumgefühls, Desorientierung – all das sind mögliche Umschreibungen für die Wirkung, die Achim Zeman mit seinen installativen Arbeiten erzielt.“ (In English: "Uncertainty of the viewer's position, irritation of the sense of space, disorientation - these are all possible descriptions for the effect Achim Zeman achieves with his installations.") The space altered by Zeman's painterly interventions not only reflects the increasing insecurity experienced by society in recent years, but also enables viewers - precisely because the irritation is caused by artistic, aesthetic means - to engage with it in the first place and to experience uncertainty and changes in perspective not as threatening, but as inspiring.

== Biography ==
Zeman studied at the Berlin University of the Arts from 1983 to 1989 and was awarded "Master scholar" (Meisterschüler) by Professor Kuno Gonschior. Inspired by him, Zeman discovered the artistic configuration of rooms with the means of painting as an area of his artistic work. Besides temporary installations, such as the one at the Rheinisches Landesmuseum in 2008 or the redesign of a room at the Hotel Beethoven in Bonn in 2009 he designs and creates installations for international art exhibitions, such as for Art Chicago 2010 and in 2011 for Art Toronto in the lobby of the Metro Convention Center. A permanent installation by Zeman is on view at Concord Park Place in Toronto. In 1990 he received a scholarship from the "Kunststiftung Baden-Württemberg", in the following year a working scholarship from the City state of Berlin. Zeman is a member of the "Westdeutscher Künstlerbund". Since 1992 he lives and works in Cologne, Germany.

== Artistic work ==
=== Panel paintings ===
Zeman works with basic geometric shapes such as lines, circles and squares. These can be found not only in his spatial installations, but also in his panel paintings. He does not apply the color on canvases, but to acrylic glass sheets, which he additionally processes and grinds with lacquers: "In his panel paintings, he uses geometric shapes such as lines, circles, and squares, which he works into acrylic glass panels using various techniques to create different effects depending on the angle of the light and the viewer’s perspective." Here, many elements of Zeman's working method can be found in a condensed form: the use of geometric forms, repetition as the structuring rhythm of the works, layering, omissions and shifts that create complex image surfaces that have an effect on the viewer.

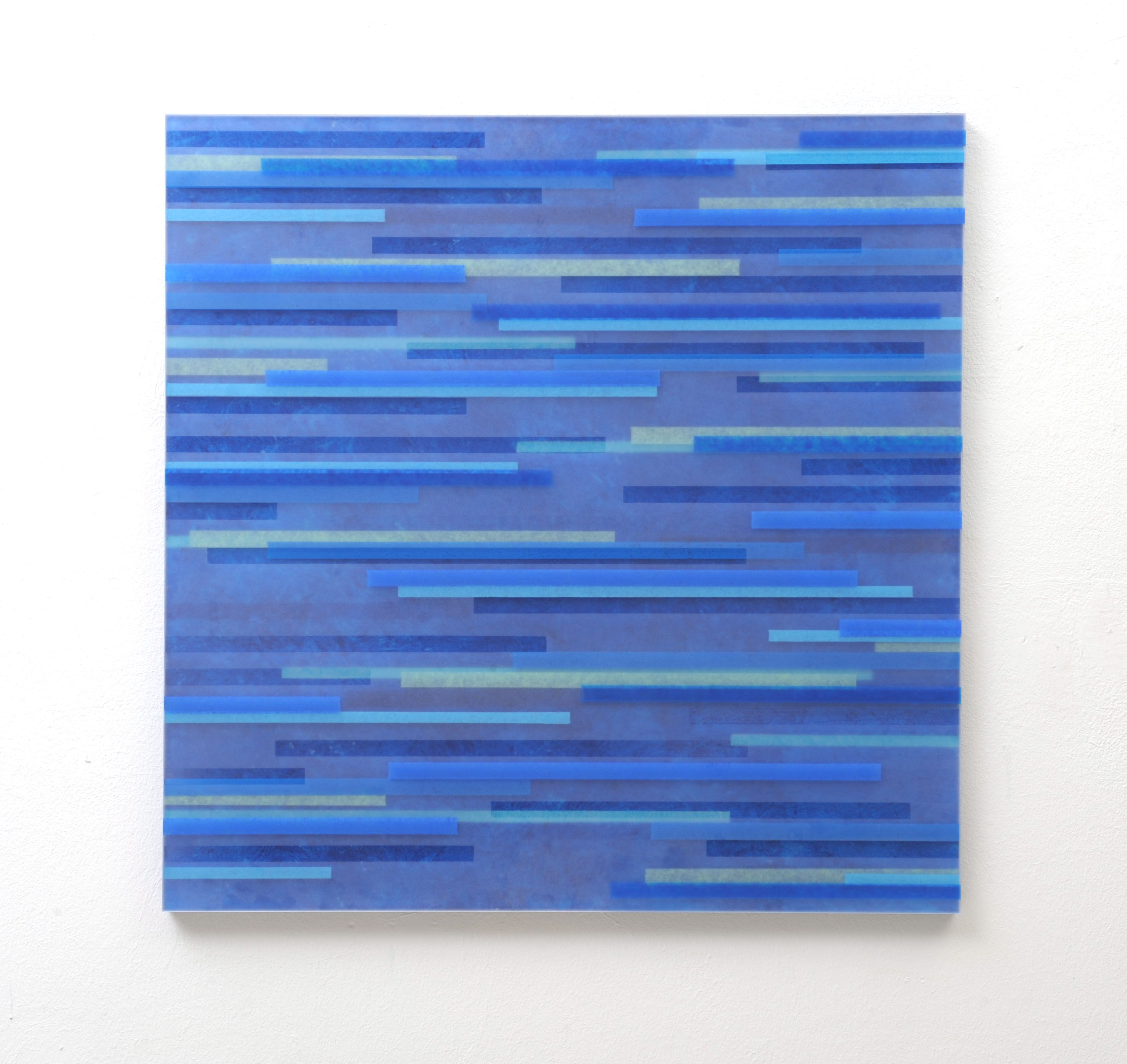
Panel painting blue, untitled, 2012 acrylic glass, screen printing colour

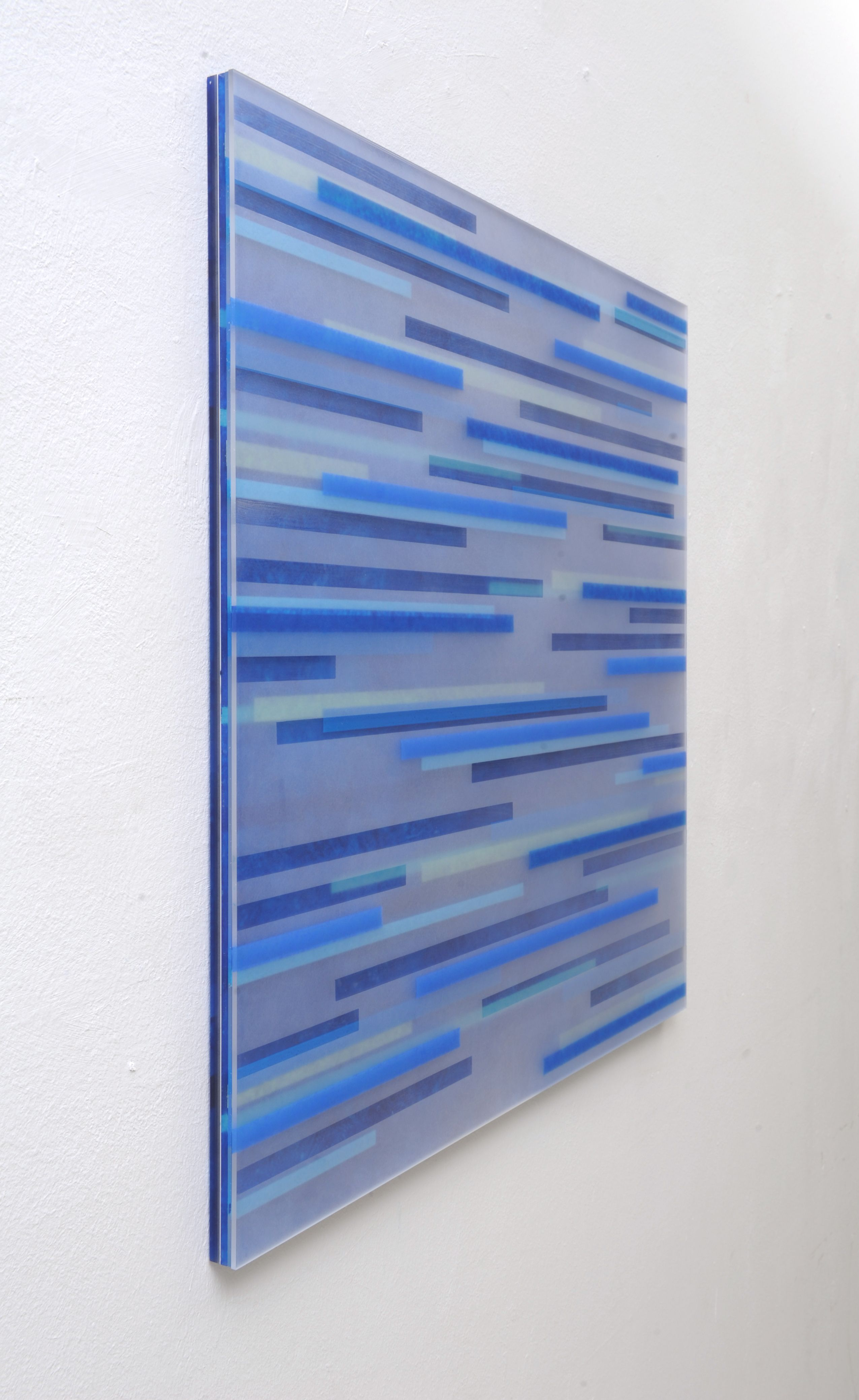
Panel painting blue, untitled, 2012 Detailed view 1

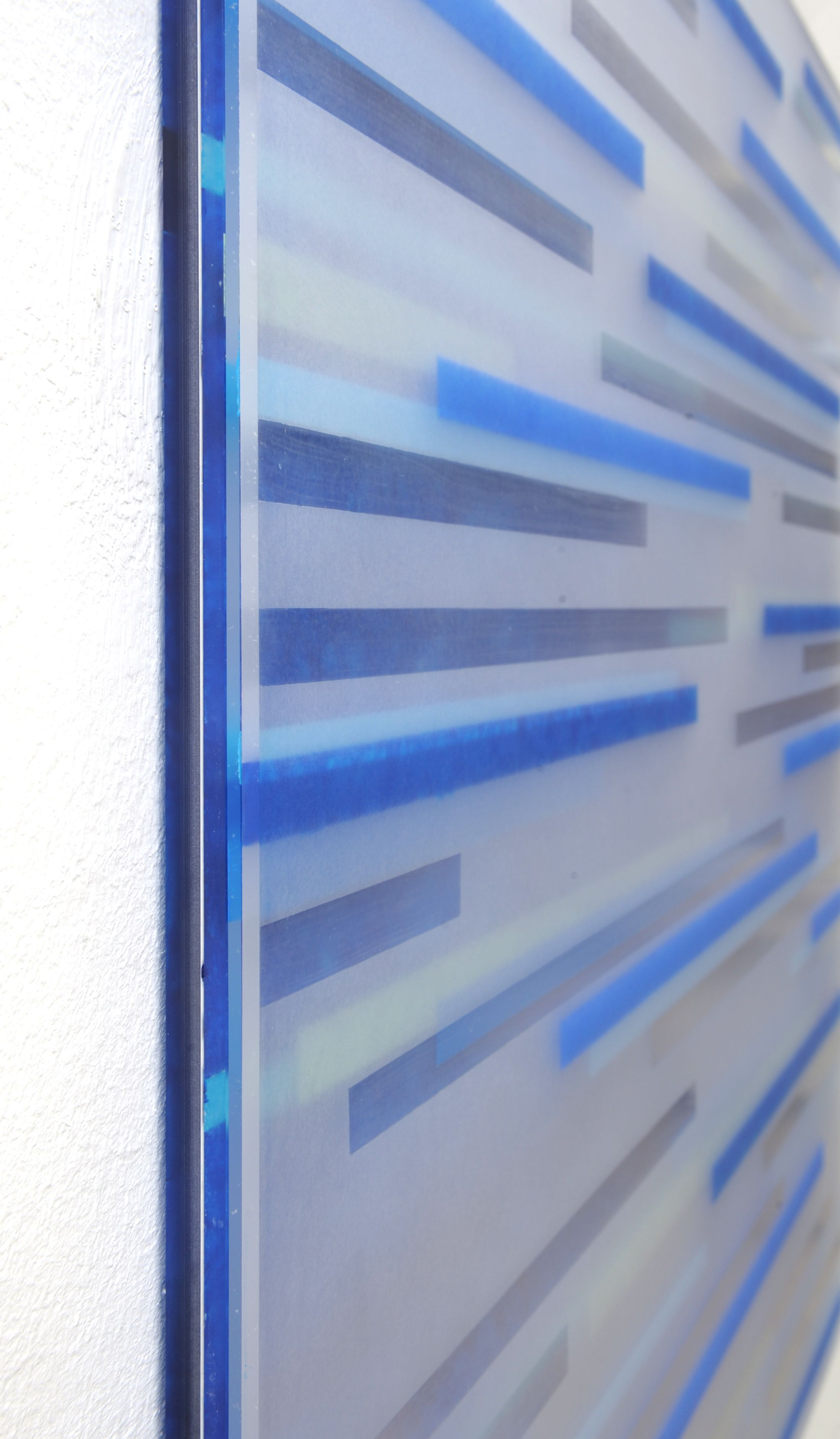
Panel painting blue, untitled, 2012 Detailed view 2

=== The spatial installations ===
The core elements of Zeman's work can also be found in the room installations: there is a basic module that refers to the room and usually consists of a geometric form. This is repeated rhythmically and structures the room. He always lets the underlying space shine through by not covering the whole room but allowing for omissions in the conception of his spatial designs. For the scene-setting at his installation "Fluten" at the Kunstmuseum Heidenheim an der Brenz, which is located in the rooms of a former swimming hall with arcade arches, Zeman flocked the floor and walls of the room with wave-shaped blue elements. Here, too, he continues to let the wall itself shine through, transforming it from a closed surface into a translucent space, a diaphanous structure.

Zeman sees himself primarily as a painter who uses painting to alienate and position rooms. In developing the productions, for example, he always takes into account the spatial conditions, such as the exposure to light, which changes the colors. He also consciously works with the subtractive color mixing, which changes the colors in the perception of the visitors on location. In the installation "Grünstreifen" (2007) at the Neuer Kölner Kunstverein, for example, yellow stripes suddenly appear optically between the red and green horizontal foil strips, even though they were not glued on.

Before creating the concept for an installation, Zeman repeatedly visits the place of the event, takes photos, measures the room and informs himself about the respective history of the room. After the first test drawings he prepares the final version on the computer. Depending on the material he uses for his interior design, adhesive plastic film slides are produced, which are later placed in the rooms in laborious detail work.

This is not only a temporal, but also a physical strain: For the work "Fly High" (2015) at the Kunstverein Oerlingshauen, whose exhibition space is located in an old synagogue, he designed the dome of the house with his installation and had to work constantly with his head on his back. n some installations, such as "Sehfest" (2008) in the Rheinisches Landesmuseum Bonn, he spent days applying the colored and fluorescent Foil parts that put a lot of burden on the eye. How exactly Zeman plans ahead is also visible in his work at the Portikus in Bochum (2010), a former public urinal at the Herner Straße in Bochum, which is now a public art-space . There he glued about 4500 foil parts according to an exact construction plan.

In most of his spatial works, Zeman also includes the respective history of a room, its earlier use or its position in a city in his concepts. For the mural in "Weststraße 3" in Radevormwald, for example, he designed his work based on the slate look of the city: "First I looked at what colours predominate here: green, white, grey. Then it was quickly clear that I wanted to get the wall moving." (In German: Zunächst habe ich geschaut, welche Farben hier vorherrschen: grün, weiß, grau. Dann stand schnell fest, dass ich die Wand in Bewegung bringen möchte.) "In Motion" is the name of the work, in which he was able to freely design 60 square metres of space that was permanently preserved as a work of art in public space.

Zeman repeatedly worked at the Villa Zanders in Bergisch-Gladbach: "Zeiträume" (2000), "Horizonte" (2006) and "Nah und Fern" (also 2006) were the titles of these spatial productions. In these exhibitions he not only used geometric forms, but also representations based on binary code. In "Zeiträume" (Periods) a barcode arranged in several lines - consisting of dots and bars based on the binary code - became part of a revolving wall scenery. The representation reproduced a coded text on the subject of time.

For "Horizonte" he developed an installation entitled "Zerstreut" (Scattered). As the basic module of his work, he took up the existing parquet flooring on the first floor of the villa (the spatial beginning of the exhibition) and designed blue foil elements, analogous to a parquet rod, with which he covers the floor.

For the Eis- und Schwimmstadion Köln Zeman painted the ice surface with so-called track pictures of ice dancing moves, circular movements in different colors. The installation was called "Circulation". These pictures are graphic representations of the figures at ice dancing, which indicate to the performers how the dances are to be skated. Zeman painted the colours on the ice surface, which were then covered with further layers of frozen water.

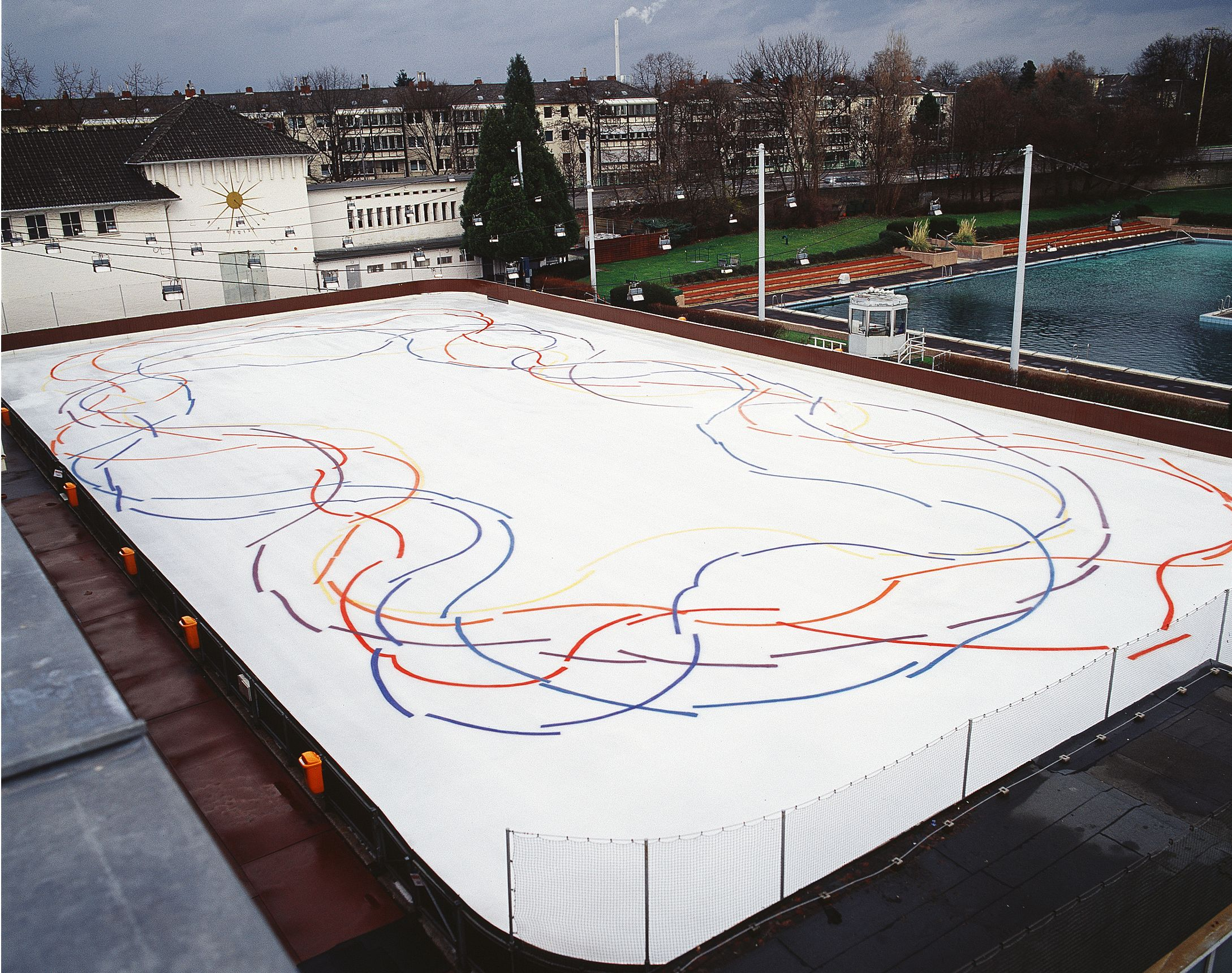
Ice Rink Cologne, 2012

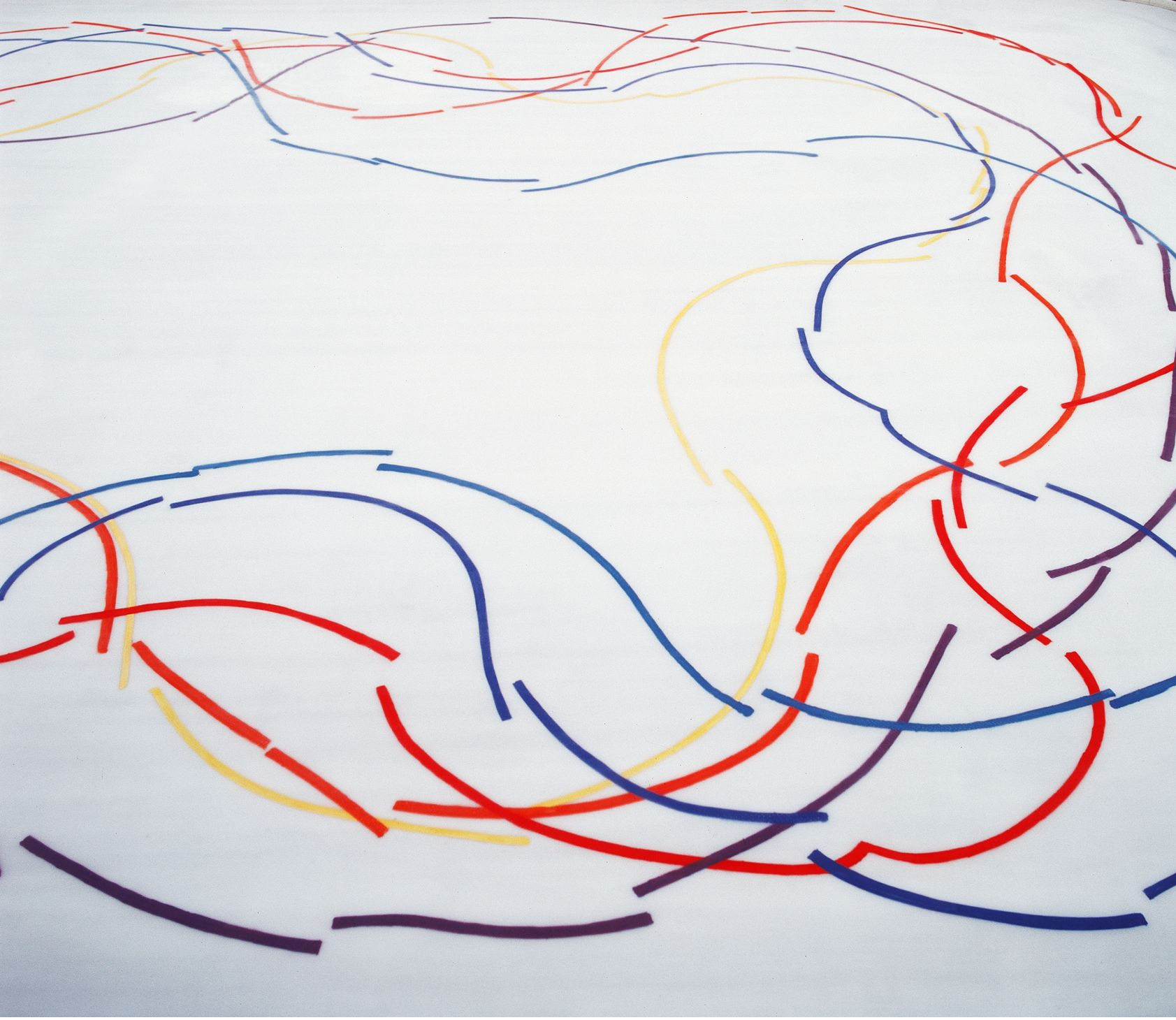
Ice Rink Cologne, 2012, Detailed view

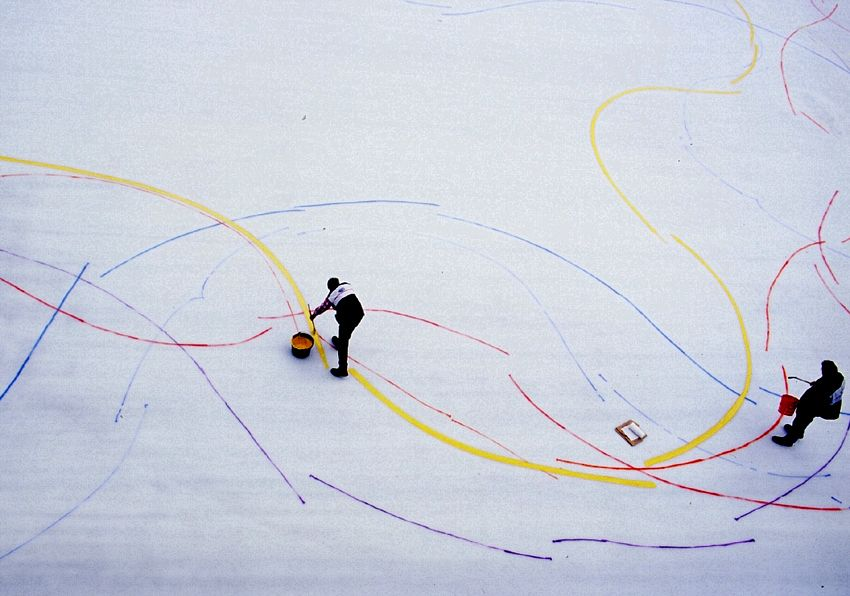
Ice Rink Cologne, 2012,
The application of the paint

=== The flooding and swirling ===
Zeman measures the spaces of his installations in order to be able to plan his works concretely so that he can create a distorted perspective, an expansion or contraction in the respective space, which, together with the selection of the material - adhesive film, paint or the electromagnetically applied flocking - can affect all the senses of the observer. For the exhibition "Durch und Durch" (2003) at the Ludwig Forum for International Art in Aachen, for example, he chose the rectangle that fits the dimensions of the room as the basic module, but at the same time inscribed this in the mathematical room constants in such a way that the desired spatial distortions could occur. His room installations often spread over the entire room, not only embracing the wall or the floors, but continue everywhere, creating the impression of a real flood or flow in the room.

Zeman often refers either indirectly or directly to the element water. Many of his spatial concepts take place in former water-related spaces, such as at the Portikus in Bochum (a public toilet), at the Kunstumseum Heidenheim, which originally was used as a swimming hall, or during the installation at Kunstbad Keitum in 2005. For the 2004 art installation in the former "Watertoren" (Water Tower) of the city of Vlissingen, he worked with diagonally attached stripes in different light and dark shades of blue: "This makes it look as if some stripes are farther away than others. The observer is put off balance." (In German: Dadurch sieht es so aus, als seien einige der Streifen weiter entfernt als andere. Dem Betrachter wird das Gleichgewicht genommen.)

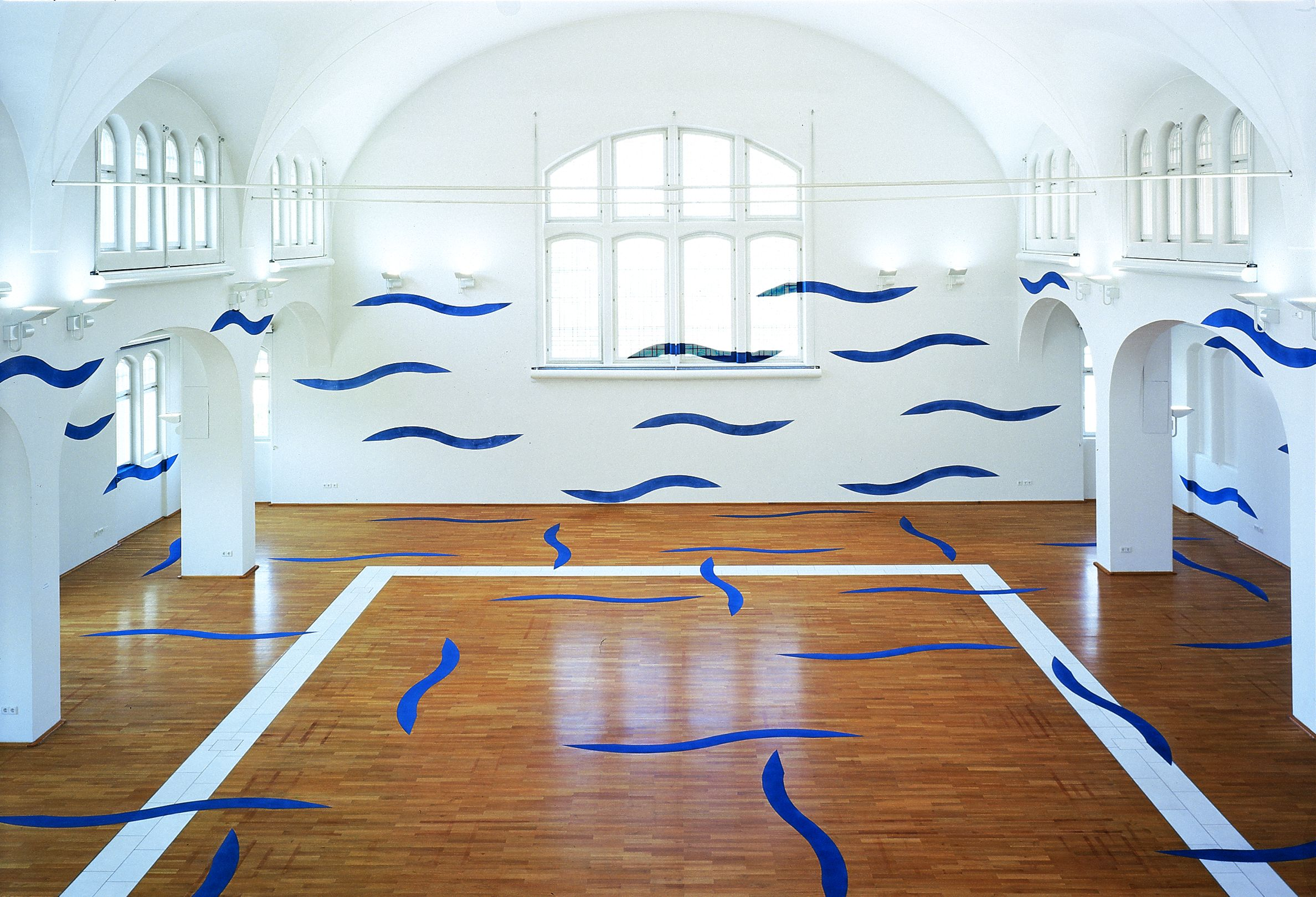
Installation Fluten,
Kunstmuseum Heidenheim 1998

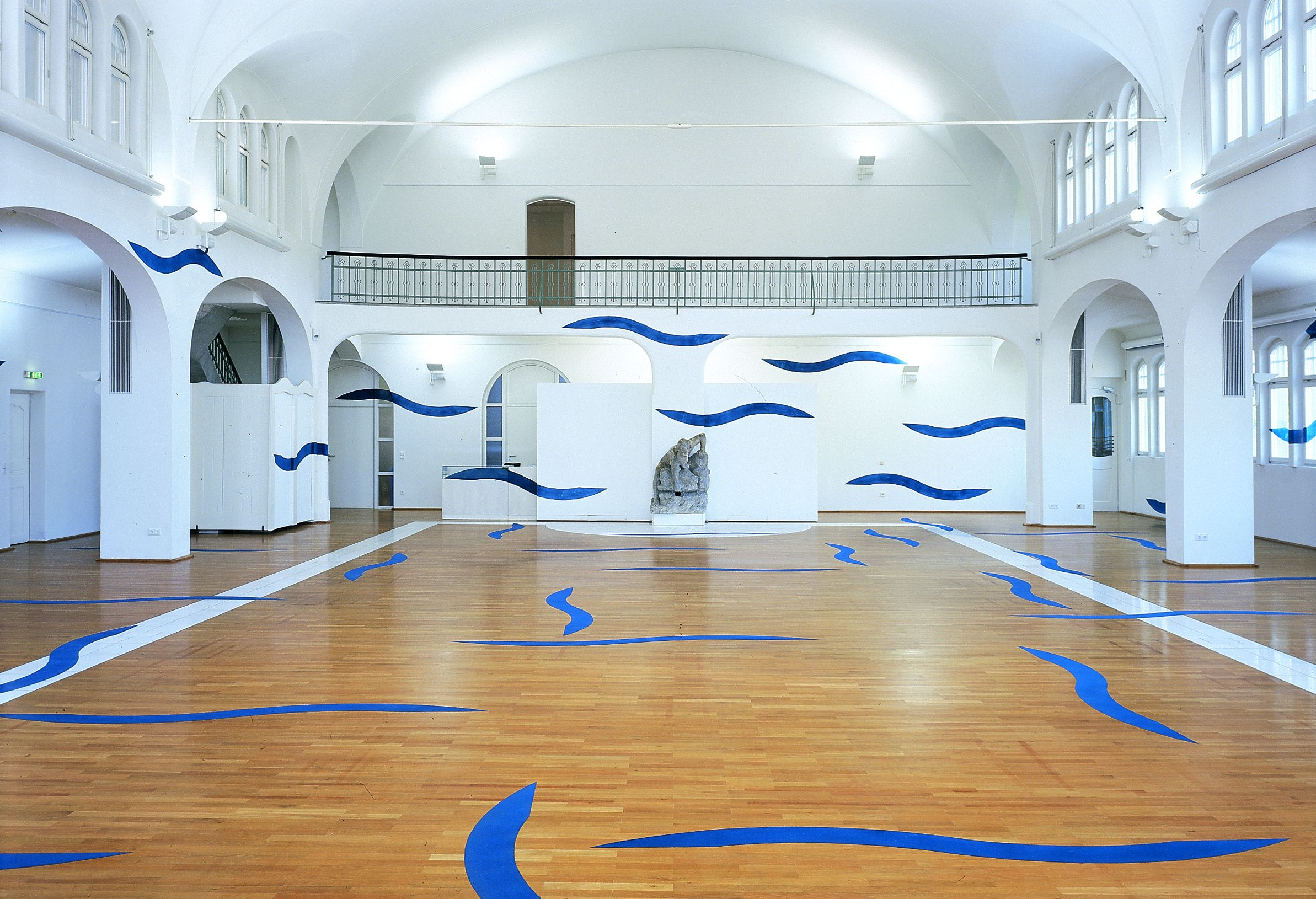
Installation Fluten,
Kunstmuseum Heidenheim 1998, Detailed view 1

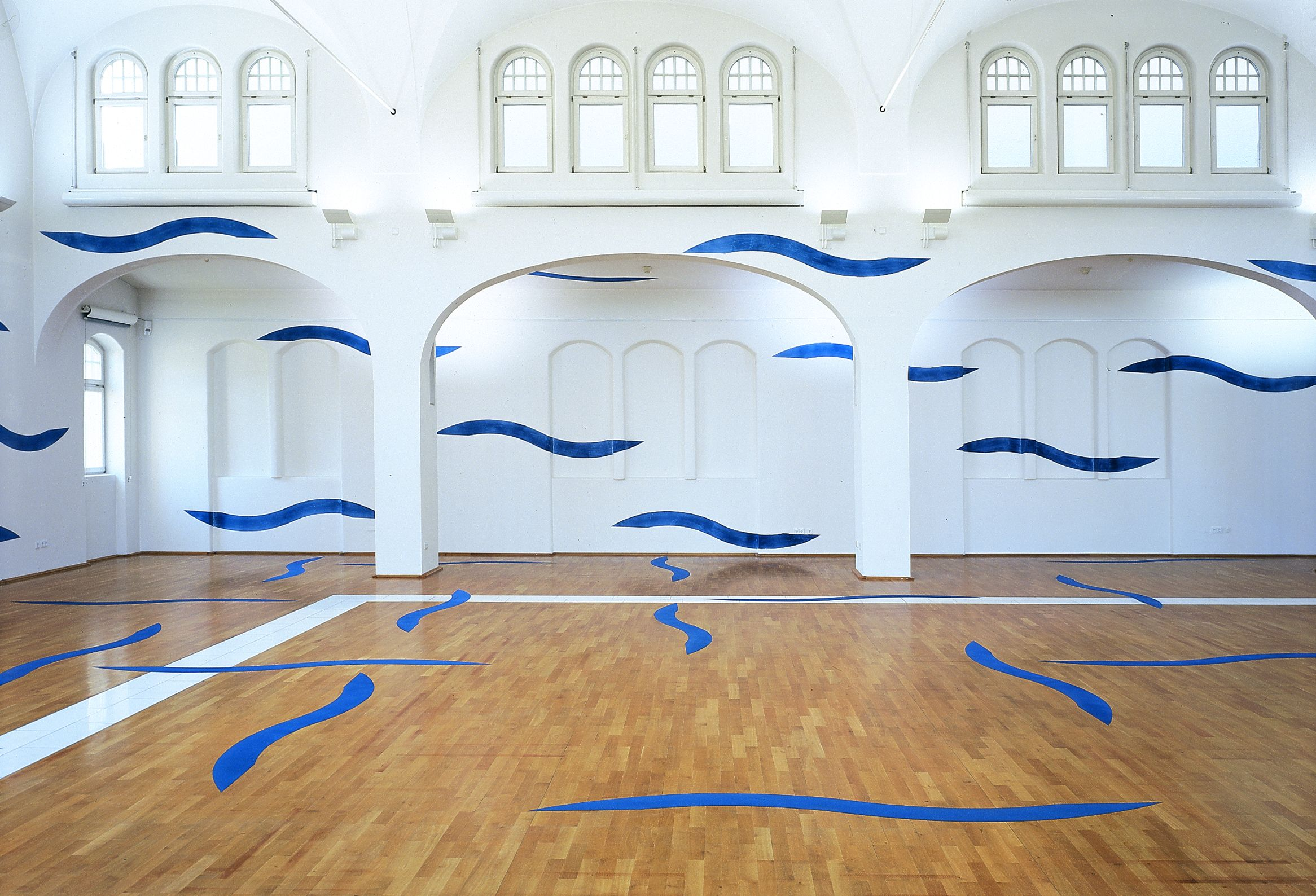
Installation Fluten,
Kunstmuseum Heidenheim 1998, Detailed view 2

=== Effect of the room installations ===
The artist is fascinated by the possibility of conveying an awareness of the processes of perception to the visitor through the respective arrangement of artistic means. In almost all of his spatial installations, the visitor is always part of the experimental setting and is prevented from gaining an overview. Thus, the viewer no longer faces a work hanging on the wall as a separate unit, but becomes part of the installation, art becomes a "walk-in picture" through one' s own physicalness. For the spatial exhibition "Laylines" (2013) at the Galerie Lausberg, Zeman has placed various marking lines, so-called Laylines, on floors, ceilings and walls, which merged into a multi-perspective Gesamtkunstwerk (Total work of art). They should draw the visitor into the room and lead him beyond the room. Here, too, the visitor is indirectly already part of the installation.

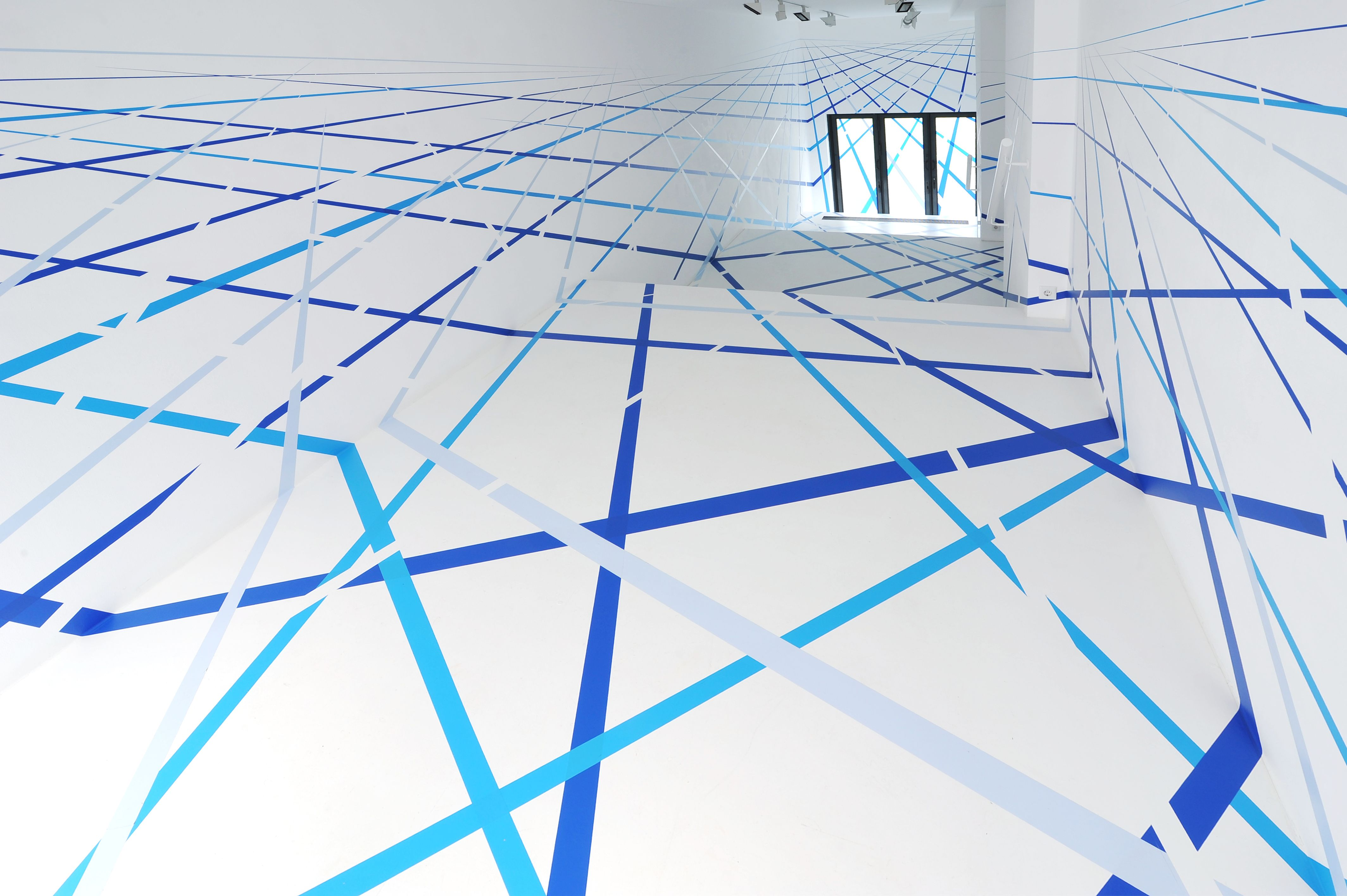
Galerie Lausberg, Laylines, 2013

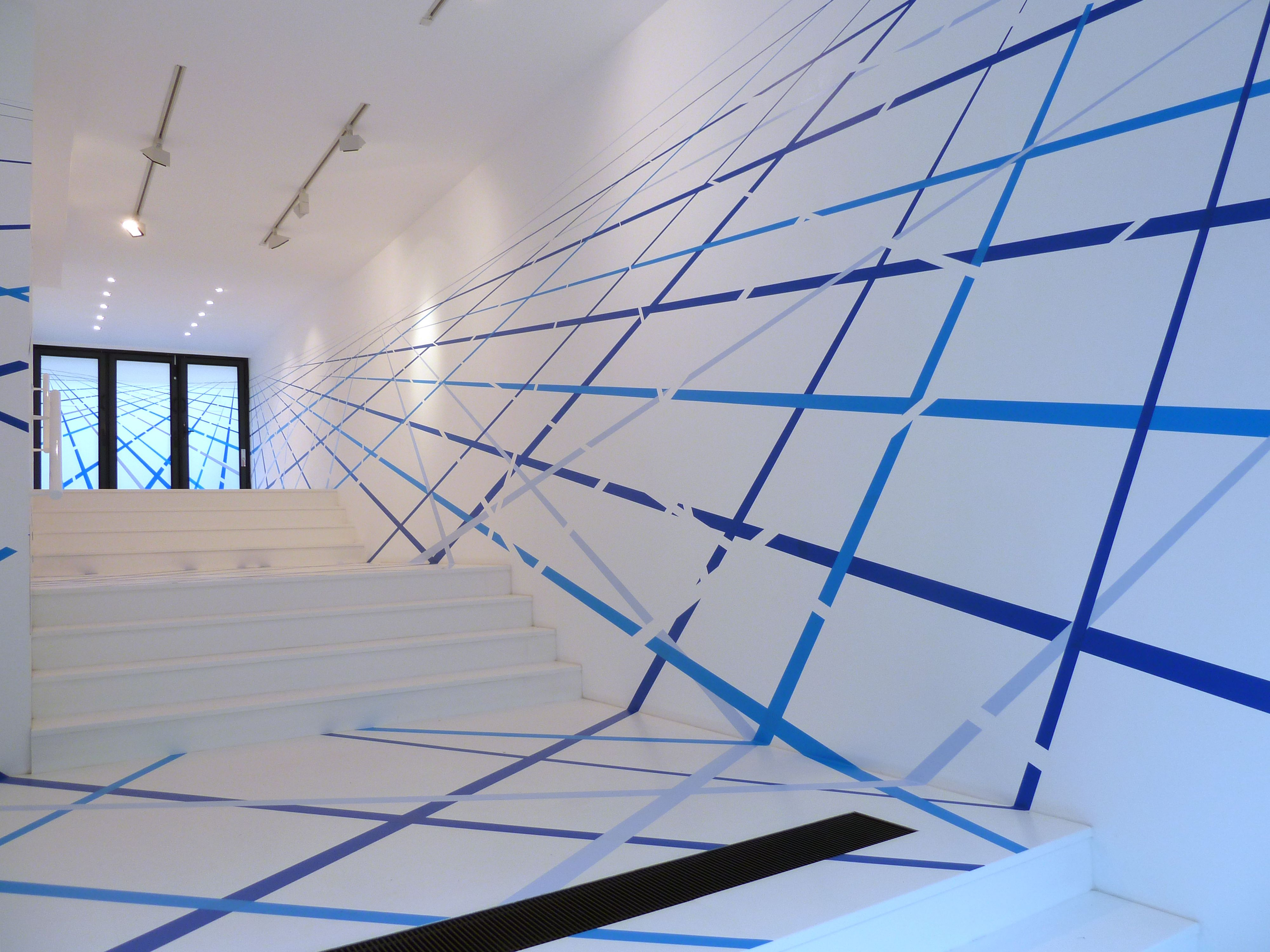
Galerie Lausberg, Laylines, 2013, Detailed view 1

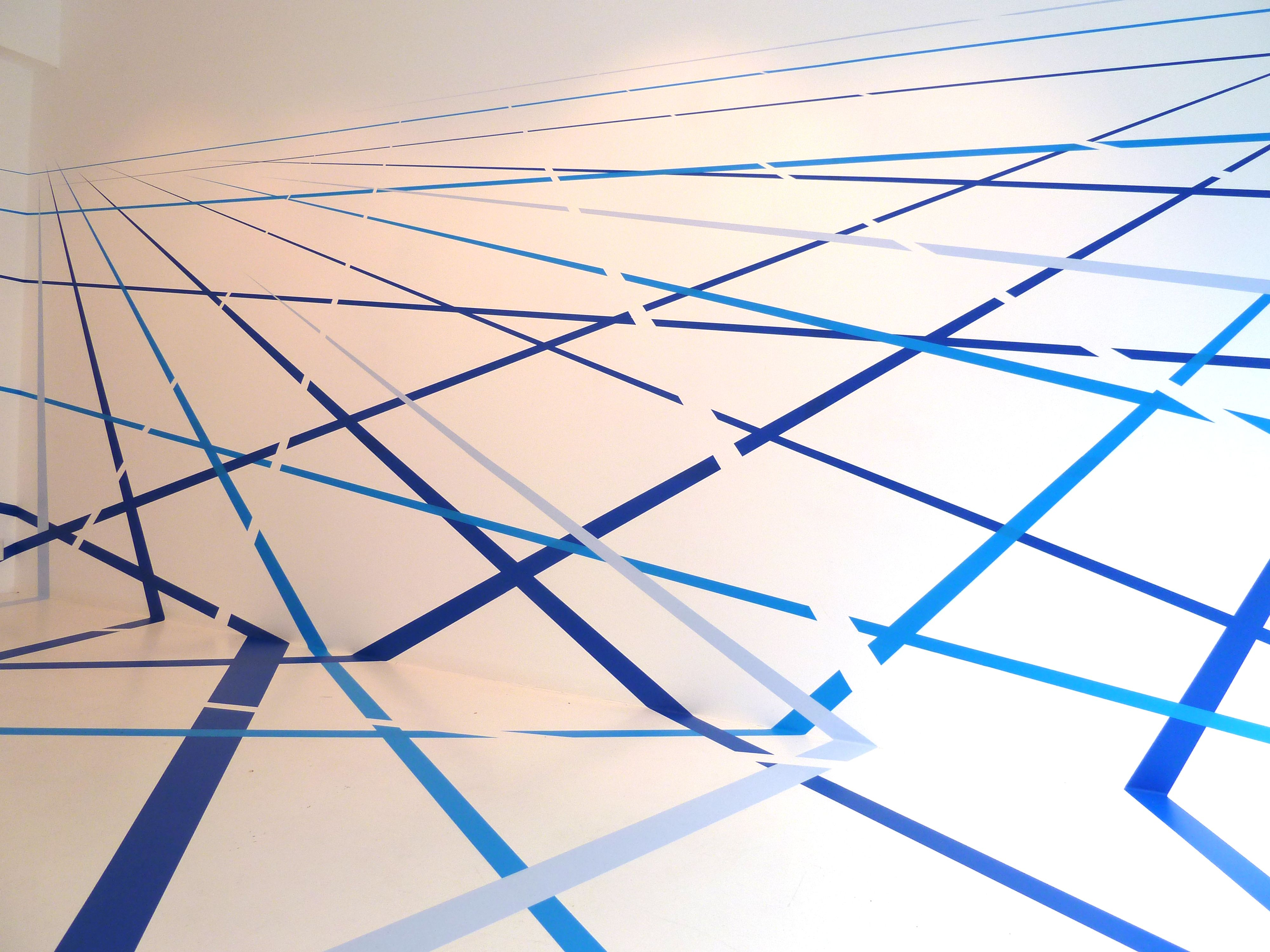
Galerie Lausberg, Laylines, 2013, Detailed view 2

Through the rhythmization of the room by means of recurring basic modules, through the mathematically exact calculation of the necessary deviations from the right angle, so that an installation can unfold a suction effect for the viewer, and through the precisely predetermined color design, it is possible for the artist to address the viewer with all their senses and also to make the three dimensional experience a souls experience. People perceive rooms and the necessary orientation of place through the body, and this perception essentially develops through active movement through a room. By placing the viewer in a "walk-in picture", making him part of the installation and at the same time rendering the position of an overall view impossible, Zeman places him in an irritation that stimulates reflection on the components of his own perception. On the occasion of the exhibition "Visible" at the Städtischen Bühnen Münster (2002) a reviewer described the effects of serial repetitions and Zeman's staging as "that primeval human fear of confrontation with limitless space" as one of the consequences.

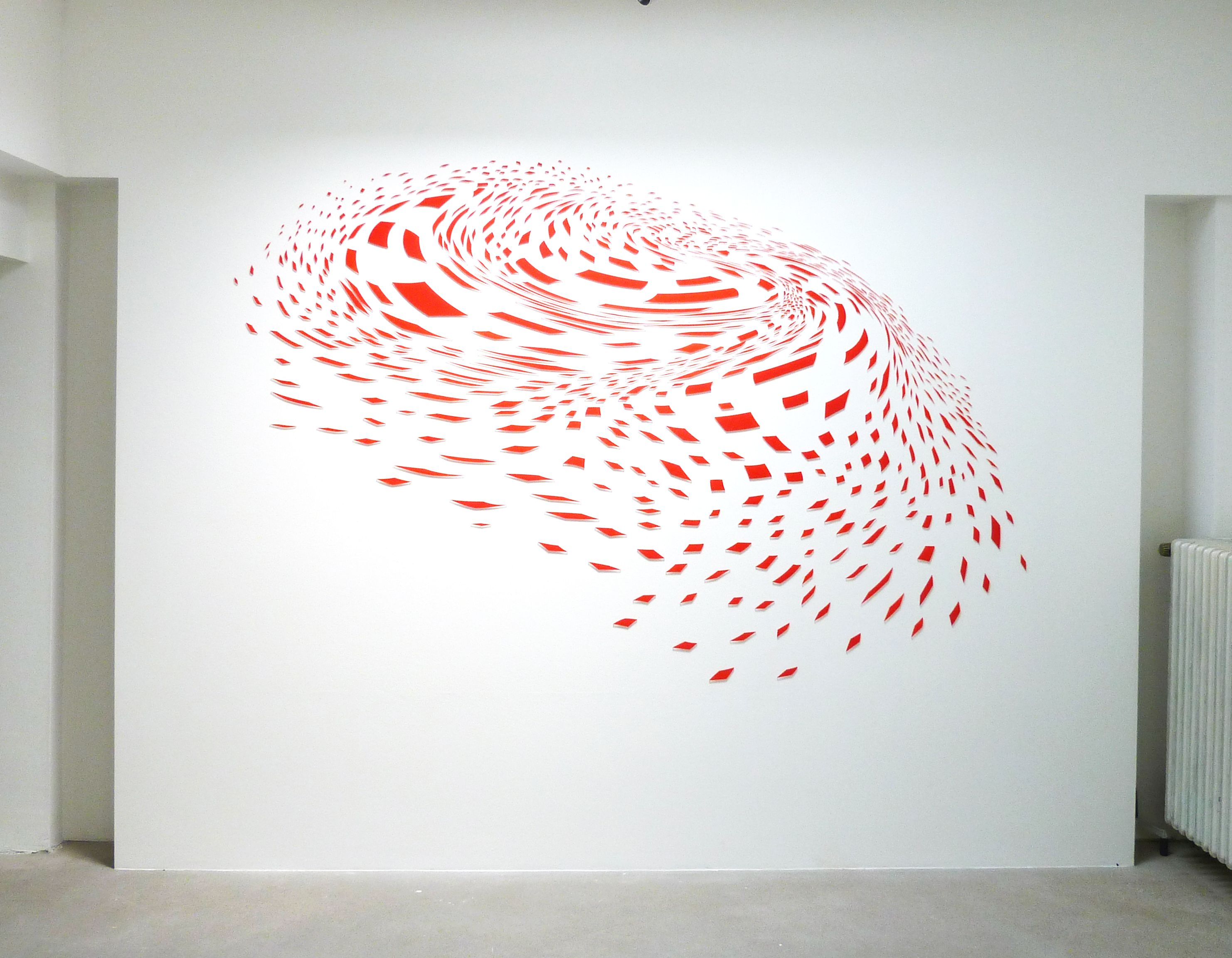
Mural painting Swirl, 2013,
Acrylic glass, screen printing ink

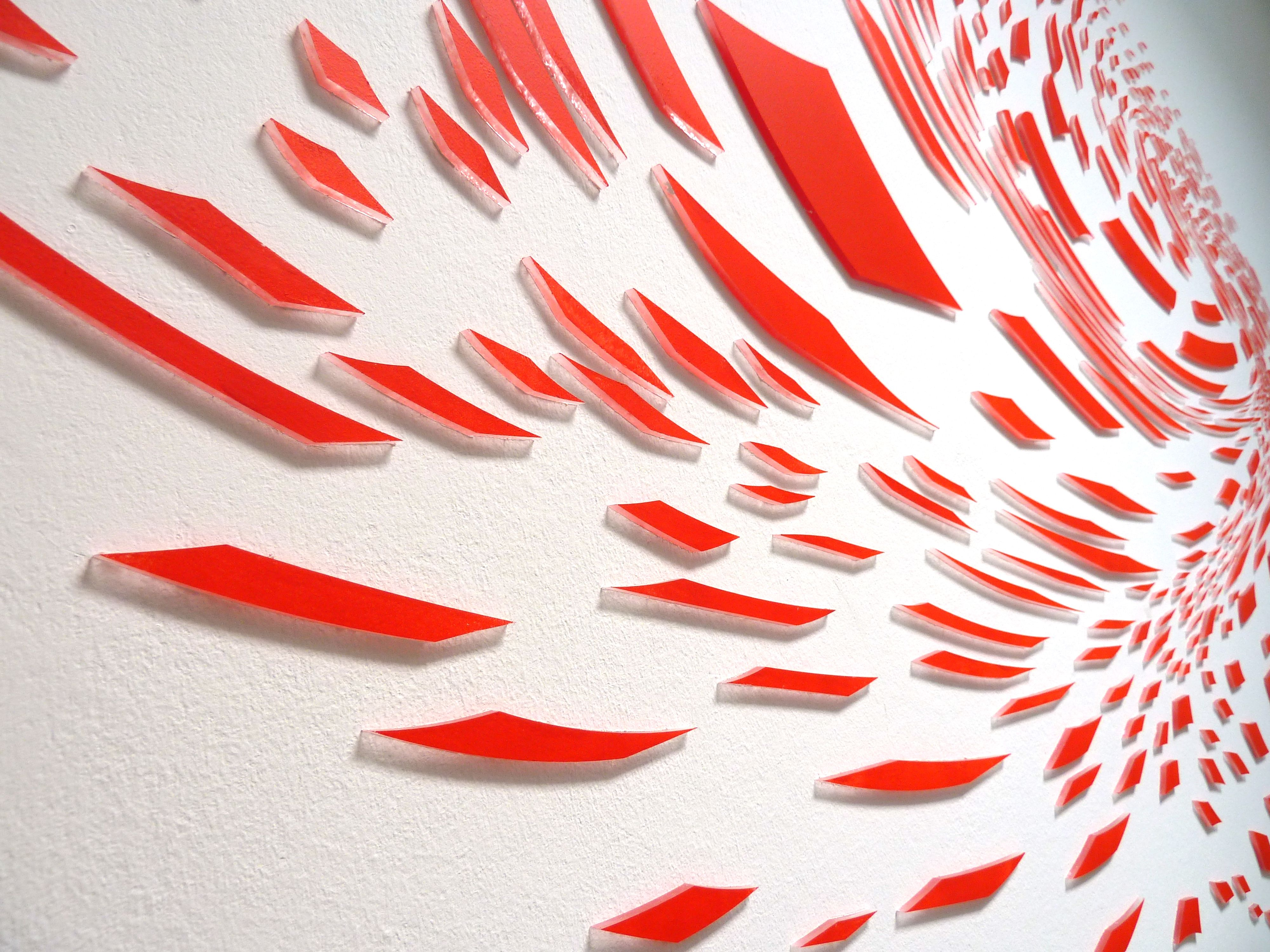
Mural painting Swirl, 2013, Detailed view 1

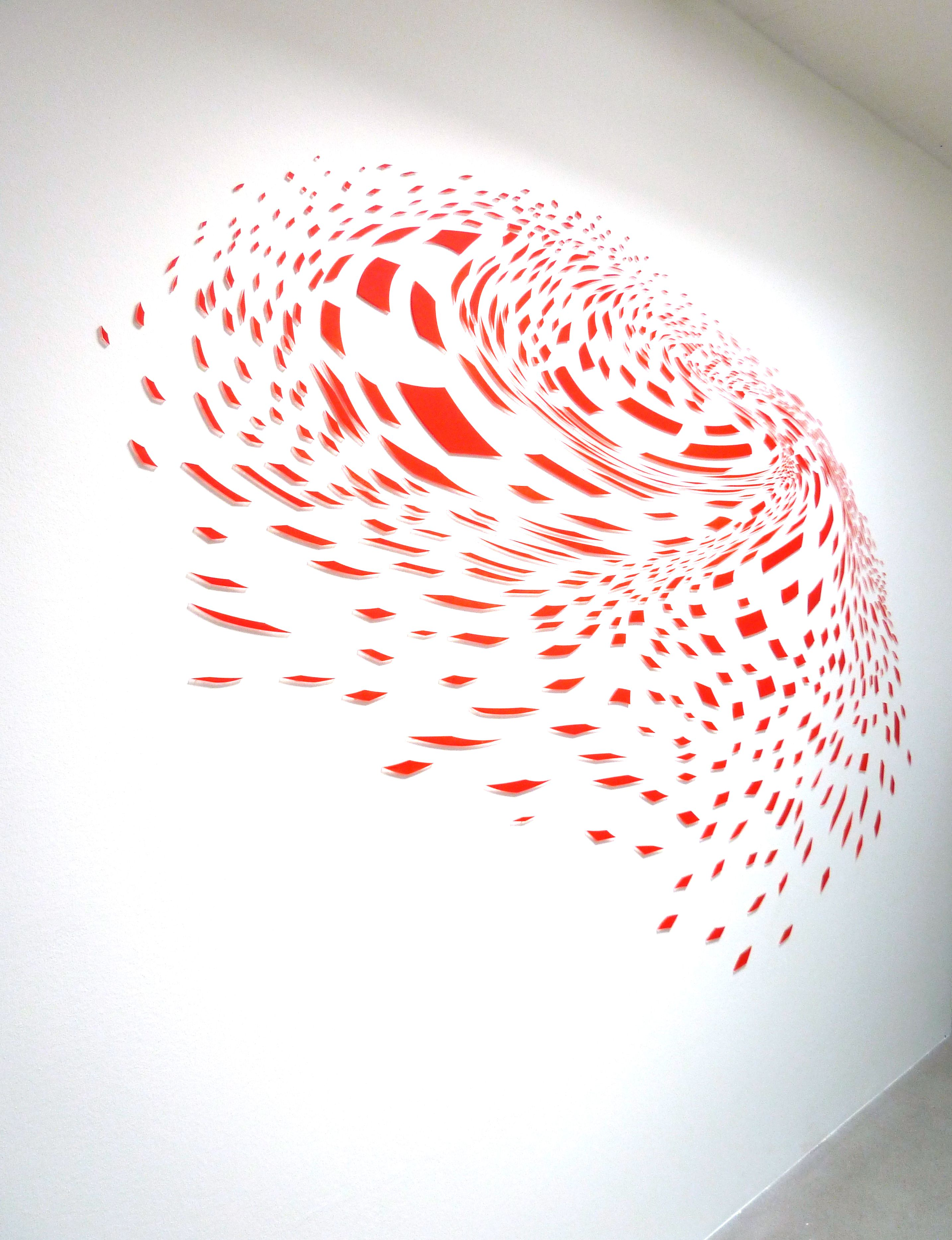
Mural painting Swirl, 2013, Detailed view 2

But the exhibition "Sehfest" (2008) at the Rheinisches Landesmuseum Bonn proves that this irritation can also be experienced with relish and joy as an extension of one' s everyday perceptions. Here, Zeman pasted the space at his disposal with a multitude of red horizontal and vertical fluorescent film parts, which have a very vitalizing and energizing effect. Gabriele Uelsberg, the museum's director, says: "For to move in a space created by Achim Zeman is like an excursion in a world full of fantasy and rich in experience, in which you can let yourself sink into the colour without stopping, and lose yourself totally in structures and optical illusions." (In German:Denn sich in einem gestalteten Raum von Achim Zeman zu bewegen, ist wie ein Ausflug in eine Welt voll Fantasie und Erlebnisfähigkeit, in der man sich haltlos auf Farbe einlassen und maßlos in Strukturen und optischen Illusionen verlieren kann.)

== Other installations ==
=== Installations on the occasion of international art fairs ===
- 2009: Rooms of Wonder – Over flow, (Installation on the occasion of the Art Fair in Toronto) Gladstone Hotel, Toronto, Canada
- 2010: Insight on site, (Installation on the occasion of the Art Chicago), Chicago, United States
- 2011 Strud@l, (Installation on the occasion of the Art Toronto) Entrance-Hall of the Metro Toronto Convention Centre, Toronto, Canada
- 2013: Laylines – Passing through, (Installation on the occasion of the Art Cologne), Cologne, Germany

=== Installations in public spaces ===
- 2009: Fully Booked – Hotel Beethoven, Moving Locations e.V., Bonn, Germany
- 2016: In Motion, Wall painting Westtraße, Radevormwald, Germany
- 2016: Straight Forward, (Work phase from 2012 to 2016) Concord Park Place, Toronto, Canada
- 2024: Motional Zone (Design of a space as part of the exhibition Poetry of the Elements), Wilhelm-Hack-Museum, Ludwigshafen am Rhein, Germany

== Videography (selection) ==
- 2016: Straight Forward – Achim Zeman, 01′ 49" (on the exhibition in Toronto)
- 2012: Straight Forward - Achim Zeman, 01′ 15"
- 2018: Achim Zeman: Laylines – Passing Through, 00′ 40"

== Solo exhibitions ==
- 1996: Durcheinander, Simultanhalle, Cologne, Germany
- 1998 Fluten, Kunstmuseum Heidenheim, Germany
- 1998 Drunter und drüber, Wilhelm-Hack-Museum, Ludwigshafen, Germany
- 1998: Träume – 15 Künstler arbeiten mit Papier, Villa Zanders, Bergisch Gladbach, Germany
- 2001: Achim Zeman, Galerie Witzel, Wiesbaden, Germany
- 2005: Schnittstellen, Dortmunder Kunstverein, Dortmund, Germany
- 2006: Horizonte, Villa Zanders, Bergisch Gladbach, Germany
- 2008: Sehfest, Rheinisches Landesmuseum Bonn, Bonn, Germany
- 2010: Liquid, Neonhalle für zeitgenössische Kunst, Portikus, Bochum, Germany
- 2013: Laylines, Galerie Lausberg, Düsseldorf, Germany
- 2015: Fly high, Synagoge Oerlinghausen, Oerlingshausen, Germany
- 2018: in motion, Galerie Lausberg, Düsseldorf, Germany
- 2022: Über Kreuz oder Quer, Brühler Kunstverein,Brühl, Germany
- 2024: Achim Zeman: Sense of Space, Dr. Carl Dörken Stiftung, Herdecke, Germany
- 2025: Achim Zeman: Raumillusionen, Illusionsräume, Stadtmuseum Beckum, Germany
- 2026: Achim Zeman: Space and Perception, Stadtmuseum Siegburg, Germany

== Group exhibitions ==
- 1991: Calculi, Neuer Berliner Kunstverein, Germany
- 1992: Das Diptychon in der neuen Kunst, Museum Folkwang, Essen, Germany
- 1998: Träume – 15 Künstler arbeiten mit Papier, Villa Zanders, Bergisch Gladbach, Germany
- 2000: Zeit–Räume – Acht Installationen zum Thema Zeit, Villa Zanders, Bergisch Gladbach, Germany
- 2003: Farbecht – Echt Farbe, Ludwig Forum für Internationale Kunst, Aachen, Germany
- 2004: Blau als Farbe,Galerie Bernd A. Lausberg, Düsseldorf, Germany
- 2005: Kunstbad Keitum, Art Galerie Scheel, Morsum, Sylt, Germany
- 2007: Anna Schuster – Achim Zeman: Lichtungen, Neues Kunstforum Köln, Germany
- 2008: Gegenstandslos, Gesellschaft für Kunst und Gestaltung, Bonn, Germany
- 2010: Beyond Painting – Lausberg Contemporary, Toronto, Galerie Lausberg, Toronto, Canada
- 2010: Landpartie - Eine Übersichtsausstellung des Westdeutschen Künstlerbundes, Kunstmuseum Ahlen, Stadtmuseum Beckum and Museum Abtei Liesborn, Ahlen, Beckum, Liesborn, Germany
- 2011: The Ornamental Gesture, Künstlerhaus Dortmund, Dortmund, Germany
- 2011: Winter Thaw, Galerie Lausberg, Toronto, Canada
- 2014: Das Bild einer Stadt, Kunstverein Ellwangen, Germany
- 2018: Squares in Motion – Kinetische Kunst aus der Sammlung Marli Hoppe-Ritter, Museum Ritter, Waldenbuch, Germany
- 2019: Dots, Points, Circles, Claudia Weil Galerie, Friedberg, Germany
- 2021: Pure - Phänomene des Betrachtens (Pure - Phenomena of looking), Galerie Bernd A. Lausberg, Düsseldorf, Germany
- 2022: Tough Connections, Neuer Kunstverein Aschaffenburg, Germany
- 2025: Kleinklein, Märkisches Museum Witten, Witten, Germany
