= Concord Park Place =

Development in Toronto, Ontario, Canada

Coordinates: 43.767°N 79.372°W

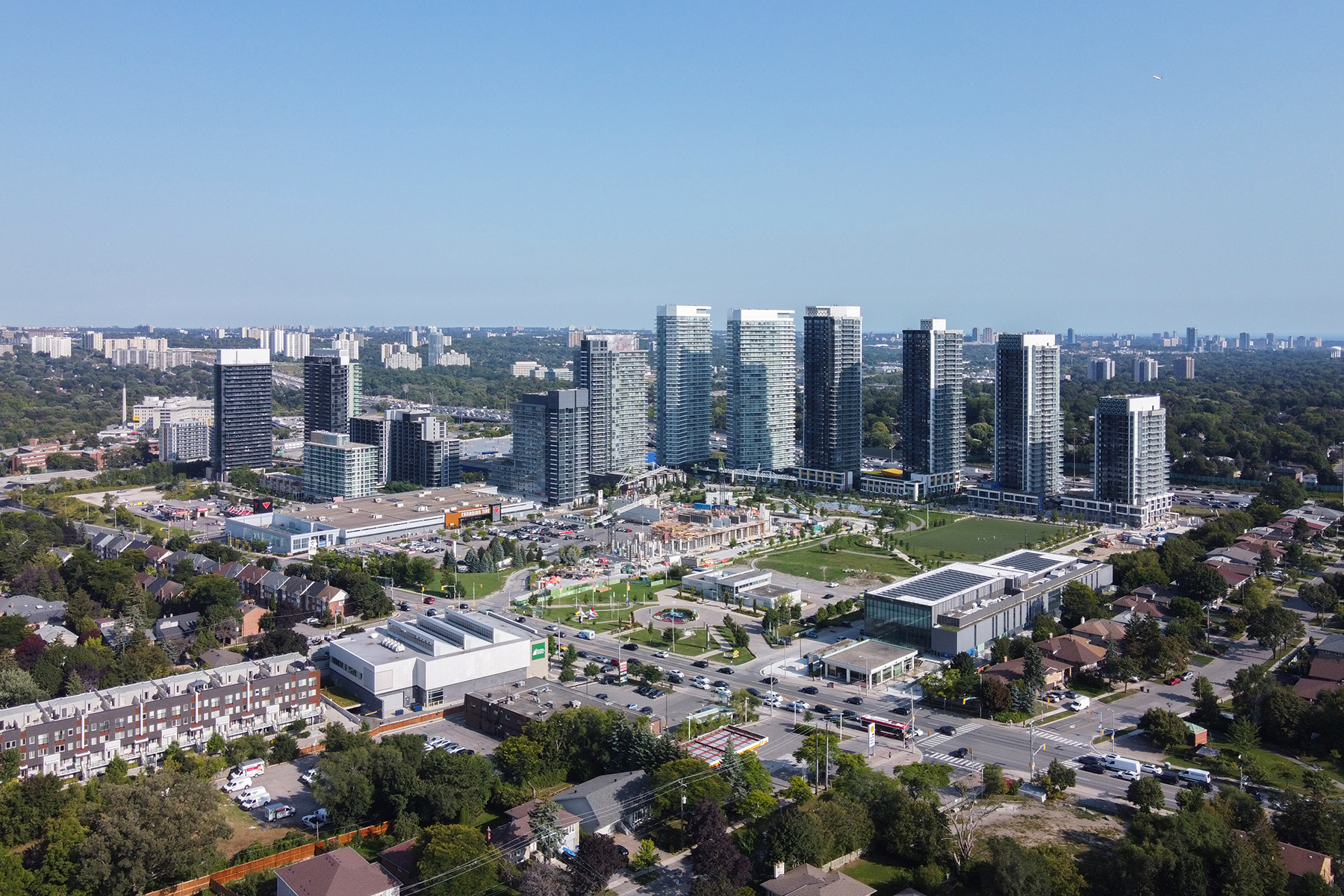
Concord Park Place in 2023

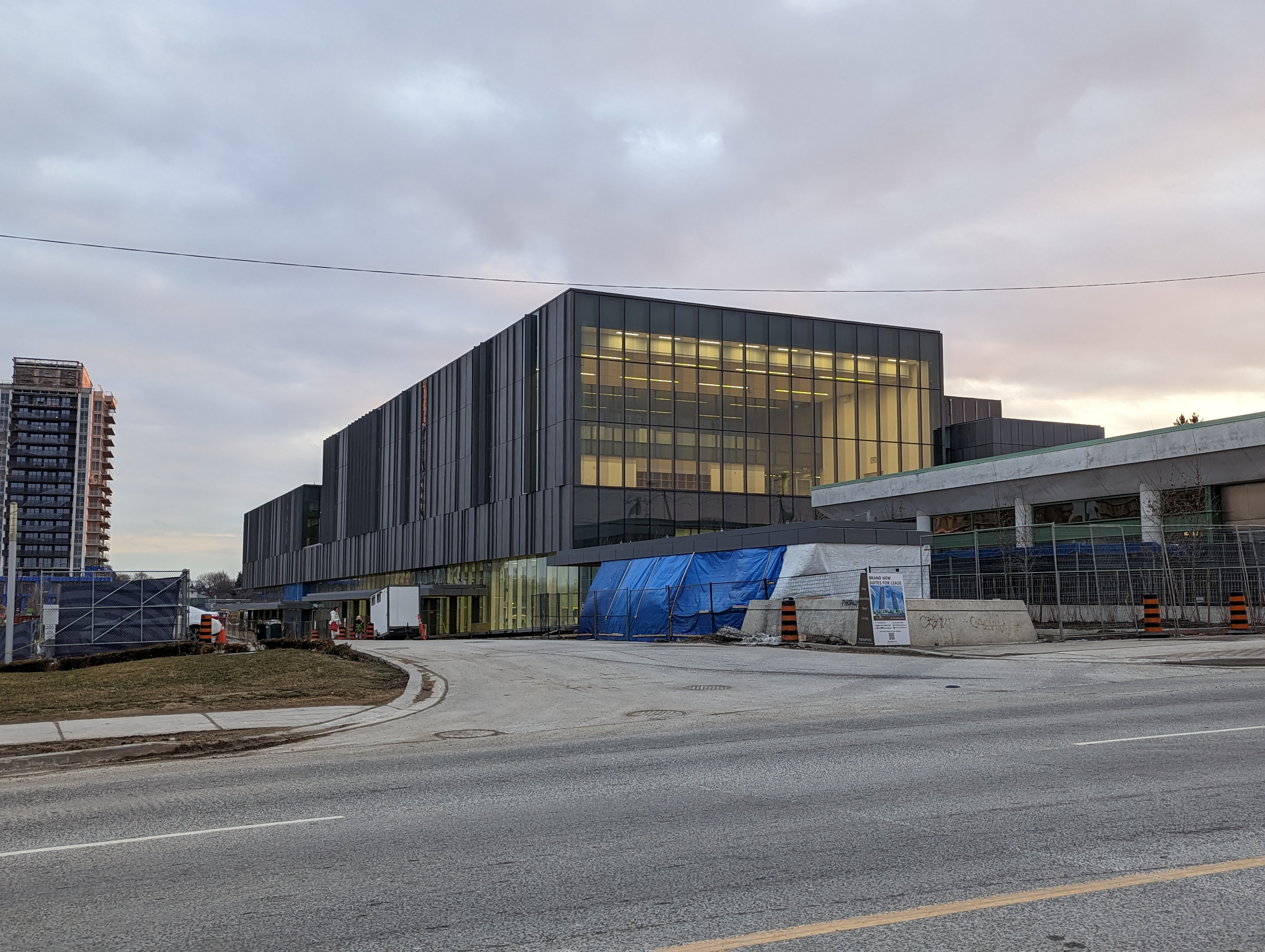
Ethennonnhawahstihnen’ Community Recreation Centre and Library

Concord Park Place is a 45-acre (18 ha) multi-tower condominium complex under construction by developer Concord Adex in Toronto, Ontario.

The development is the second largest master-planned community in Toronto, behind CityPlace on Toronto's waterfront. Upon completion, the development will have 20 residential towers with around 10,000 residents, 2 new schools and a community centre. The site is located between Sheppard Avenue, Leslie Street, Highway 401, and Bessarion Road, and creates a south extension of the Bayview Village neighbourhood of North York.

== History ==
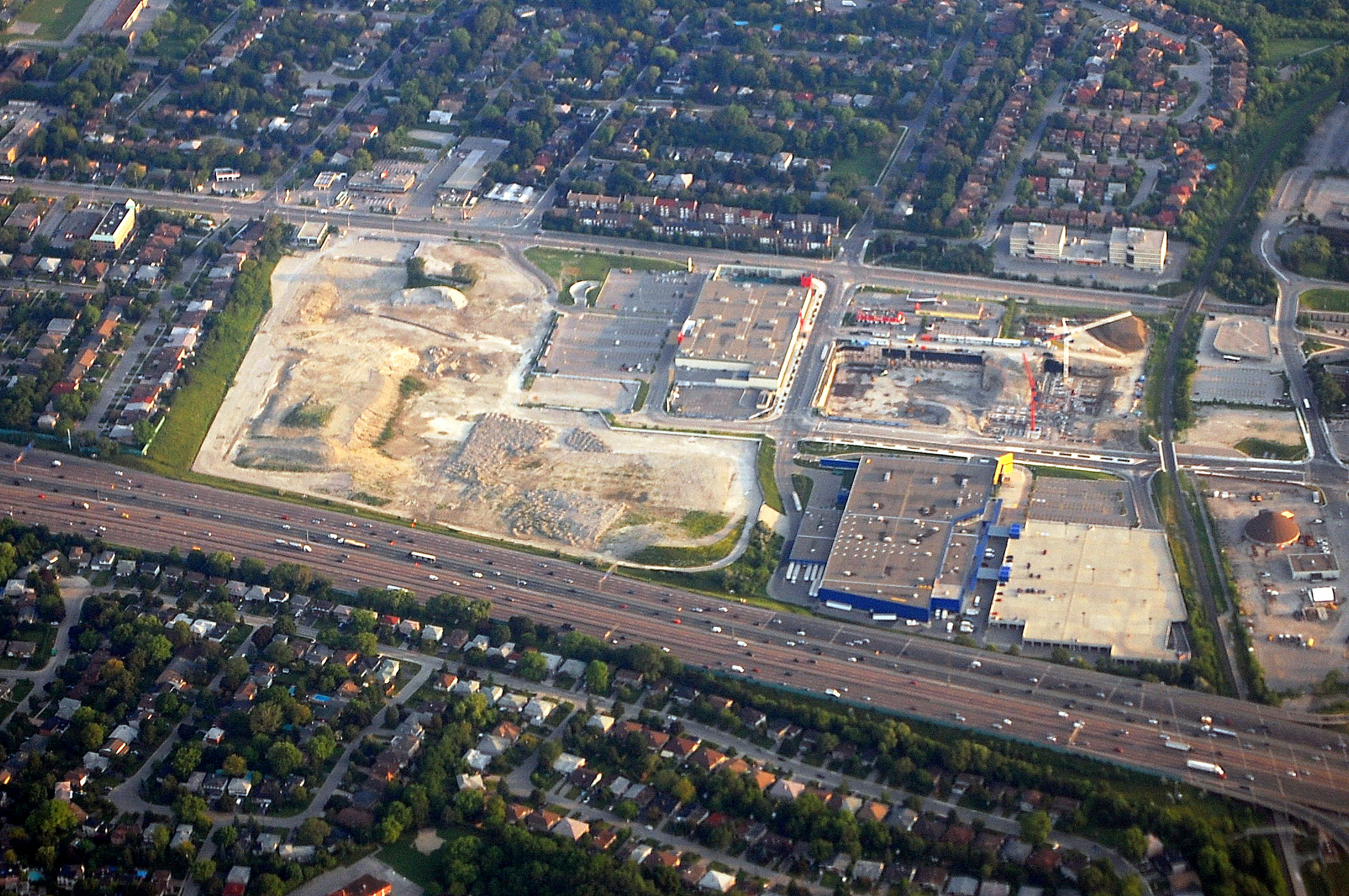
Construction site in 2009

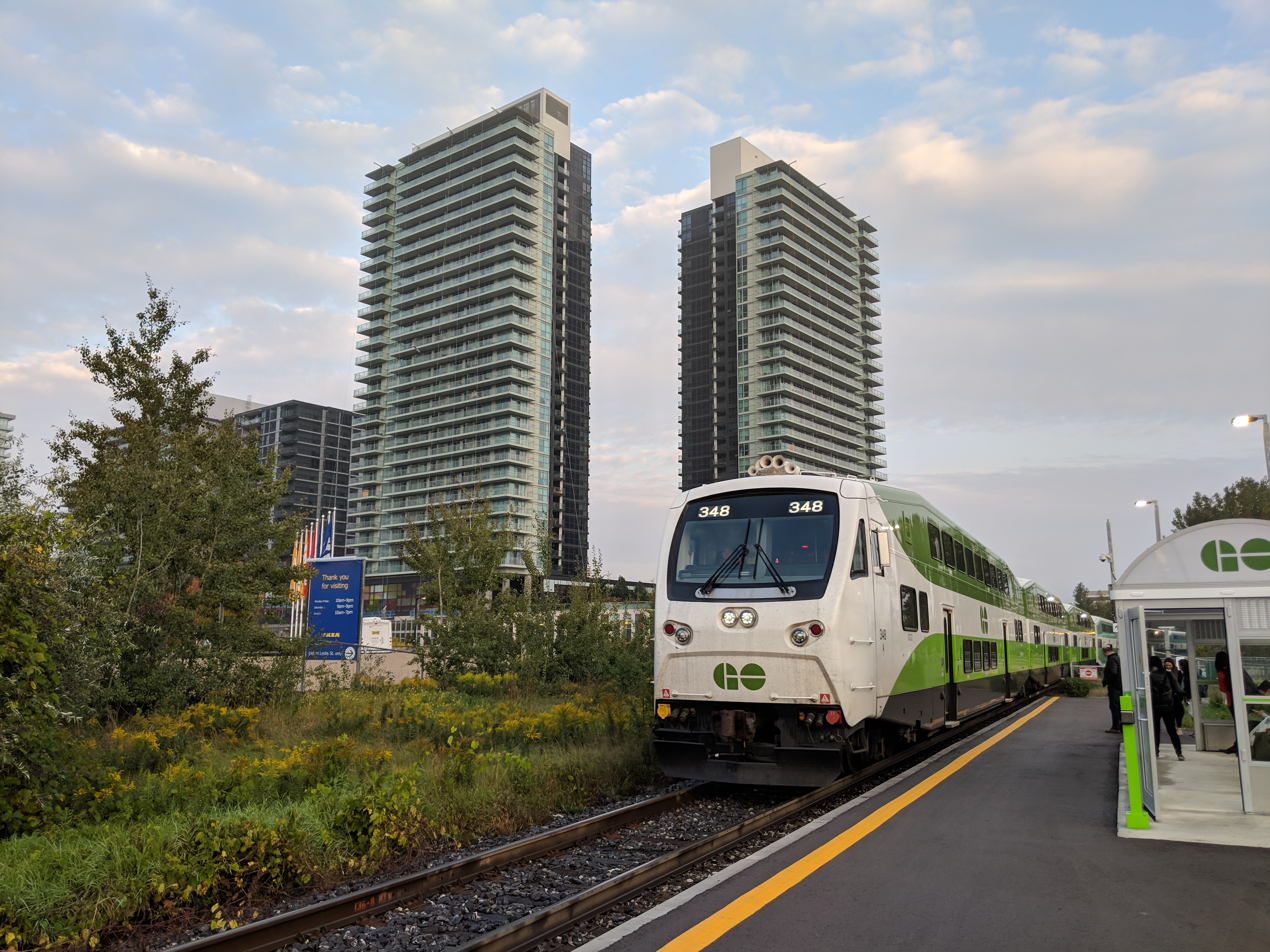
View of Concord Park Place from Oriole GO station

Until the 1960s, the site was used as farmland. At that time Canadian Tire built a large distribution facility and retail store on the site. The buildings were surrounded by single-family homes built in the 1950s and 1960s. In 1999, Canadian Tire began the process of moving their distribution centre to Brampton, Ontario, and the retail store was relocated to nearby Provost and Sheppard Avenue East. Canadian Tire then sold the site to the developer Concord Adex. Demolition of the old buildings began in 2007.

The first phase of the development was completed in 2015, consisting of four buildings – Discovery (buildings A, B) and Discovery II (buildings D, E) – located to the north of an IKEA store. Early phases of the development were criticised for being located far away from Bessarion station. However, Concord Adex notes that the development and the community centre will increase ridership at the station.

In January 2020, the 8-acre (3.2 ha) Ethennonnhawahstihnen' (Etta-nonna wasti-nuh) Park was opened. The name - which means "where they had a good, beautiful life" in Wendat - was chosen as a Wendat archaeological site was nearby to the site.

As of April 2021, eight residential towers have been completed, while four towers are under construction. Upon completion, Concord Park Place will include 5,000 condominium units in 20 buildings, high-rise, and mid-rise, as well as 2 schools, community centre & library and a new public park.

In July 2023, the Ethennonnhawahstihnen' Community Recreation Centre was opened to the general public. At the same time, the Toronto Public Library officially opened the Ethennonnhawahstihnen' Branch. Situated directly behind the southern entrance to Bessarion station, the new library replaced the now closed Bayview Branch, which was previously located inside of the Bayview Village Shopping Centre.

== Transportation ==
Concord Park Place is near the Leslie and Bessarion subway stations on the Sheppard subway line. IKEA used to operate a shuttle service from the store to Leslie station.

Highway 401, Highway 404/Don Valley Parkway and Sheppard Avenue are the major routes near the site.

GO Transit's Oriole station is located under Highway 401 with an access road on Leslie Street. The station is a stop on the Richmond Hill line.

Within the development are a number of new or expanded local roads. Esther Shiner Boulevard connects Old Leslie Street and Provost Drive to Leslie Street; the portion from Provost to the railway underpass used to be the main driveway to the IKEA store. Provost Drive has been extended under the railway line to meet with Esther Shiner Boulevard and extends to the rear of the IKEA store.

== Neighbourhood ==
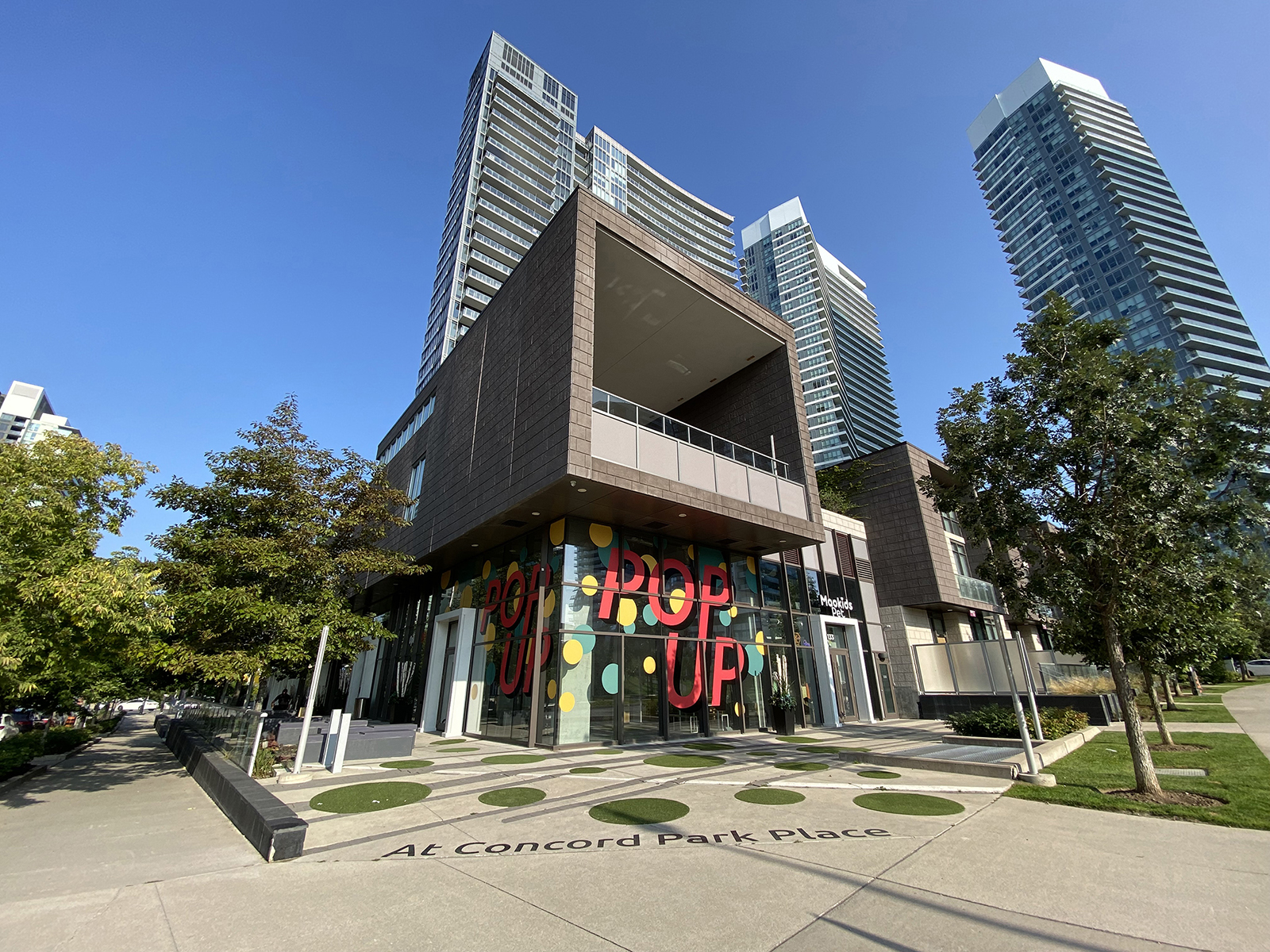
Tango Condominiums provide few shops for basic needs

Near the development is the Bayview Village Shopping Centre, a large IKEA store, North York General Hospital, a Canadian Tire store, Toronto Fire Services Station No. 116, and a Toronto Transportation and Public Works yard.

== Public art ==
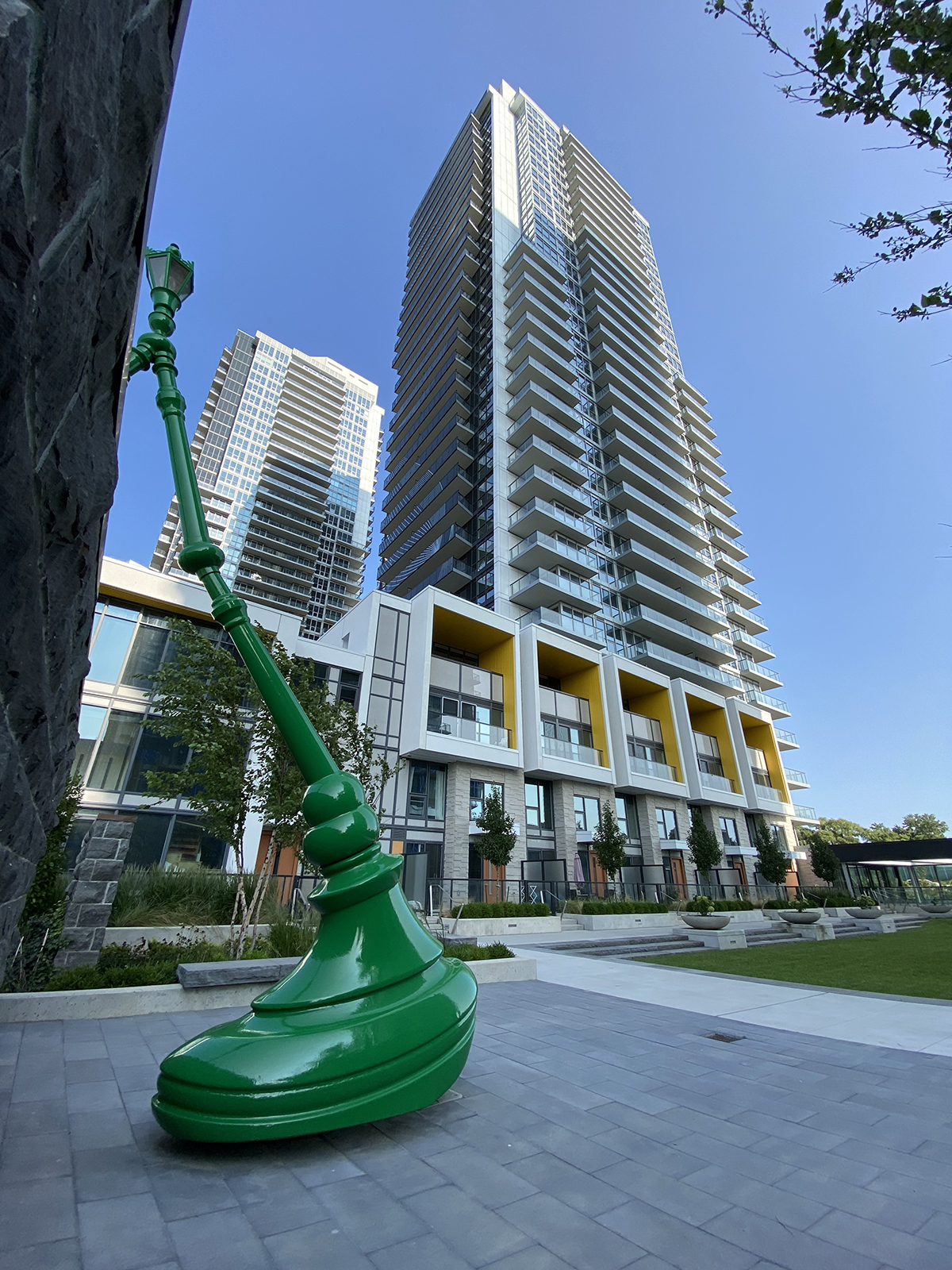
Seasons I& II Sculpture

The developers have incorporated publicly visible art into their buildings. For example, one of the towers displays a large installation by artist James Lahey, "Toronto Tree Blossoms", in the corner glass.

In 2016 the German artist Achim Zeman applied an installation at Tango 2 named "Straight Forward", which covered the entrance and part of the building as well. The porte cochère and the fitness studio at the ground floor were packed with translucent aqua-toned strips. The view of the interior was obscured by the many horizontal strips: "For those on the sidewalk, movement in the gym can be seen through the windows—and a curious passerby could press their nose up to the glass to look through a gap if they felt they just had to—but the colourful work mostly makes abstract the details behind it, affording some privacy for those running on the treadmills." Above the ground floor Zeman covered the building with strips in various shades of blue and turquoise, as if the blue sky was reflected on its surface. In order to see the whole installation, the viewer had to move around the space.
