= Sylvie Bélanger =

Canadian artist (1951–2020)

- Born: May 8, 1951; Le Gardeur, Québec, Canada
- Died: October 8, 2020 (aged 69); Montréal, Québec, Canada
- Education: Concordia University, York University, Université de Montréal
- Known for: installation artist, video artist

Sylvie Bélanger (8 May 1951 – 8 October 2020) was a Canadian interdisciplinary artist using sound, video, photography and installation. She lived and worked in Toronto as an Associate Professor of Visual Studies at SUNY Buffalo until her retirement in 2017. Where after, she moved to Montréal.

== Early life ==
Bélanger received an MFA from York University, a BFA from Concordia University and a Baccalauréat in Philosophy of Religion from Université de Montréal.

== Work ==
Bélanger exhibited her multimedia installations across Canada, USA, France, Germany, Spain, England, the Netherlands, Japan, Thailand, Philippines and China.

Joan Murray discussed her works such as He and She (1992) in "Canadian Art in the Twentieth Century" (1999) saying it was witty and mysterious. In 2002 Bélanger was commissioned to create public art for the Bessarion subway station in Toronto. The work is a series of friezes of hands, feet and backs of heads, which represent the users of the station. The feet images appear on the concourse level while the heads appear on the platform level. The hand images appear along the stairs between the Sheppard Avenue side entrance/exit and the concourse.

== Death ==
Bélanger died on 8 October 2020 of cancer at the age of 69.

== Collections ==
- Gemeente Museum, The Netherlands,
- Oakville Galleries, Ontario
- Art Windsor-Essex, Ontario
- Musée national des beaux-arts du Québec
- The Canada Council for the Arts Art Bank
- Art Gallery of Guelph
- Woodlawn Arts Foundation, Toronto

== Awards ==
Bélanger was the recipient of the Stauffer Prize awarded by the Canada Council for the Arts
