= Bessarion station =

Toronto subway station

Bessarion
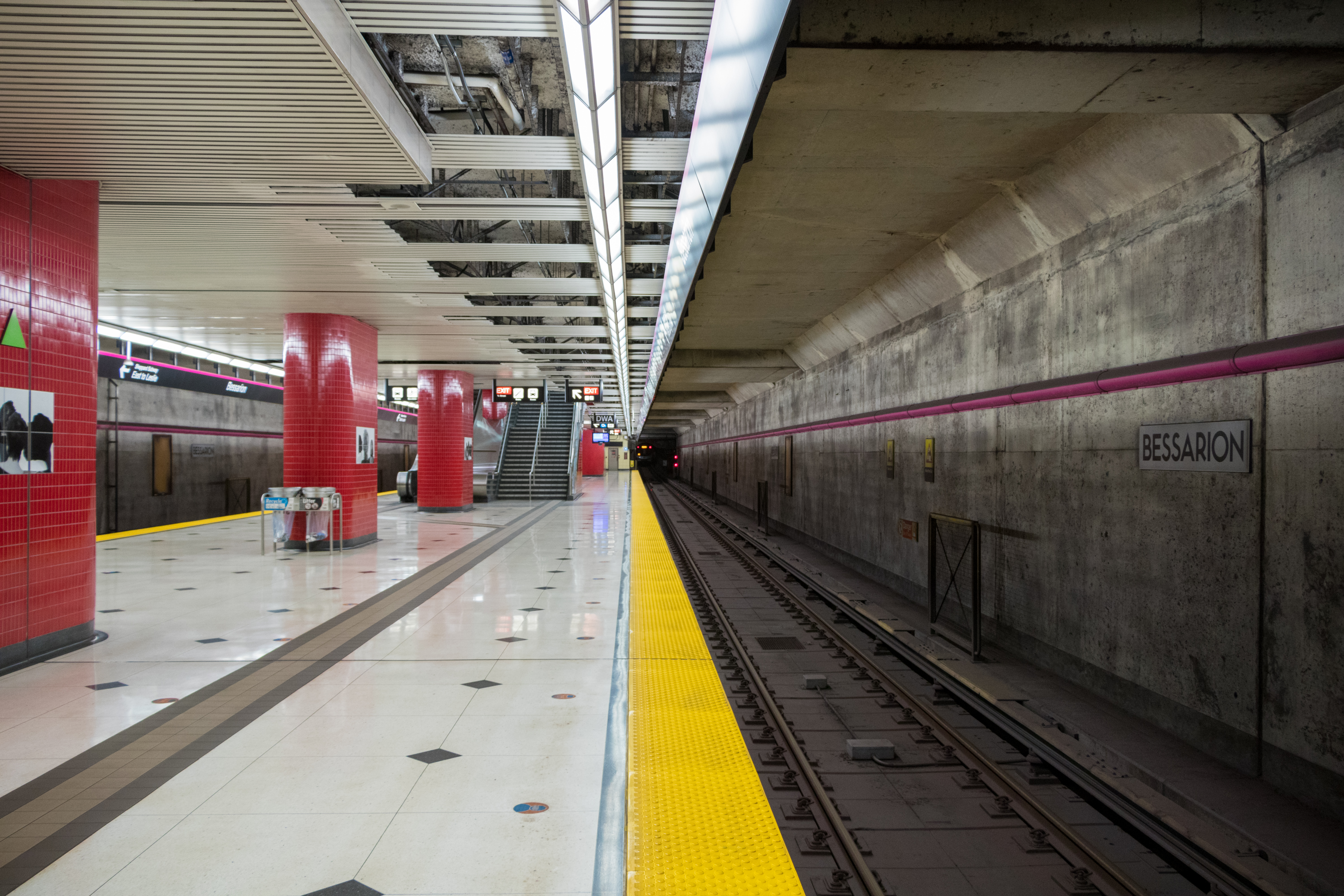

General information
- Location: 731 Sheppard Avenue East, Toronto, Ontario; Canada
- Coordinates: 43°46′09″N 79°22′36″W
- Platforms: Centre platform
- Tracks: 2
- Connections: TTC buses: 185 Sheppard Central; 385 Sheppard East

Construction
- Structure type: Underground
- Accessible: Yes
- Architect: URS Cole Sherman

Other information
- Website: Official station page

History
- Opened: November 24, 2002; 23 years ago

Passengers
- 2023–2024: 3,180
- Rank: 70 of 70

Services
Preceding station	Toronto Transit Commission	Following station
Bayview towards Sheppard–Yonge	Line 4 Sheppard	Leslie towards Don Mills
Location

Bessarion is a station on Line 4 Sheppard of the Toronto subway. Opened in 2002, it is the least-used station on the heavy-rail portion of the subway system as of 2024, with an average of 3,180 passengers per weekday.

== History ==
Due to numerous budget overruns that occurred during the construction of the Sheppard line, the TTC contemplated abandoning the plan to construct Bessarion station to save money. However, a decision was ultimately reached in October 1998 to proceed with building the station. This decision was influenced by the potential for redevelopment in the surrounding area. Councillor David Shiner played a key role in advocating for the station, highlighting its importance as a selling factor for proposed housing units.

During the excavation of the site, it was discovered that the soil had been contaminated with hydrocarbons, believed to be from the two gas stations that had previously occupied the area. As a precautionary measure, the soil was removed and decontaminated during the construction of the station.

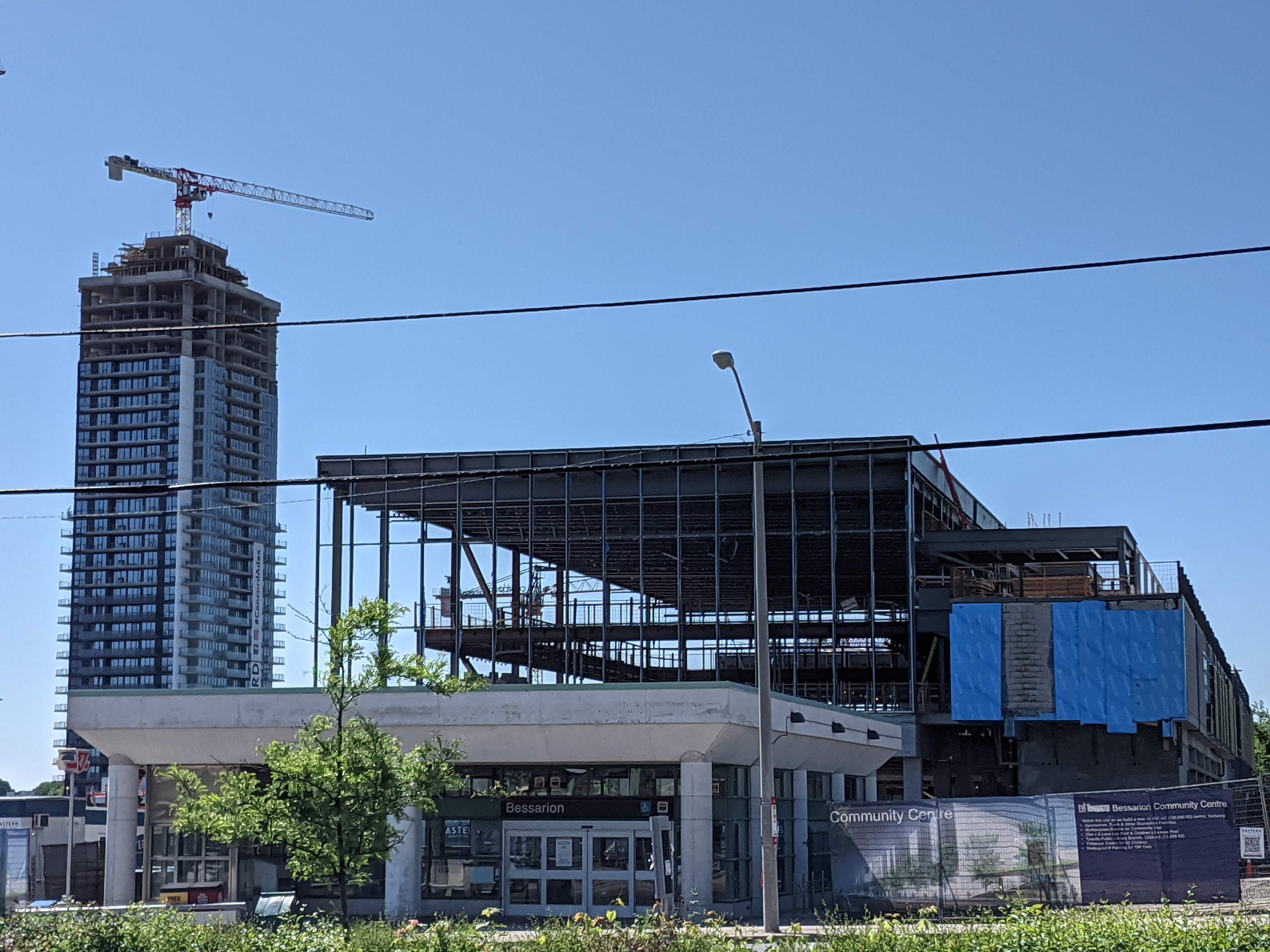
Bessarion Community Centre under construction in May 2021, behind the station entrance

In the mid-2000s, Line 4 was dubbed a "white elephant" due to its low ridership levels. TTC officials joked that "keeping ticket sellers awake is the biggest challenge amid the boredom that is Bessarion station".

In 2007, developer Concord Adex began construction on Concord Park Place, an 18-hectare (45-acre) condominium and townhouse development, next to Bessarion. Upon completion, the development will include 20 residential towers, 2 schools, a combined community centre and library, and a new public park. Initially, the project was criticized for being located too far from the station, but the developer asserted that the community centre would increase Bessarion's ridership. The Ethennonnhawahstihnen' Community Recreation Centre, located to the south of the station, opened in July 2023. Other residential developments in the vicinity of the station have also been proposed.

Between 2008 and 2018, ridership at Bessarion increased by 3 percent, in stark contrast to the 14 percent surge in ridership along all of Line 4. The station had roughly half the amount of passengers at Don Mills, the second-busiest station on the line.

== Station description ==
Like all stations on the Sheppard line, Bessarion is fully accessible and has been since it opened. The main entrance on the south side of Sheppard Avenue is fully accessible, with elevator, escalator, and stair access to the concourse level, where another elevator connects to the subway platform level. The north entrance provides direct access to the concourse level only with stairs.

The subway continues underground in a bored tunnel in both directions; east into Leslie and west to Bayview.

== Architecture and art ==
The station's interior is generally outfitted in tiles of cream and deep red. The public art in the station, titled Passing by Toronto artist Sylvie Belanger, is a frieze of 800 photographs, representing the users of the station. Images of feet appear on the concourse level, heads appear on the platform, and hands appear along the stairs leading to both of the station's entrance pavilions.

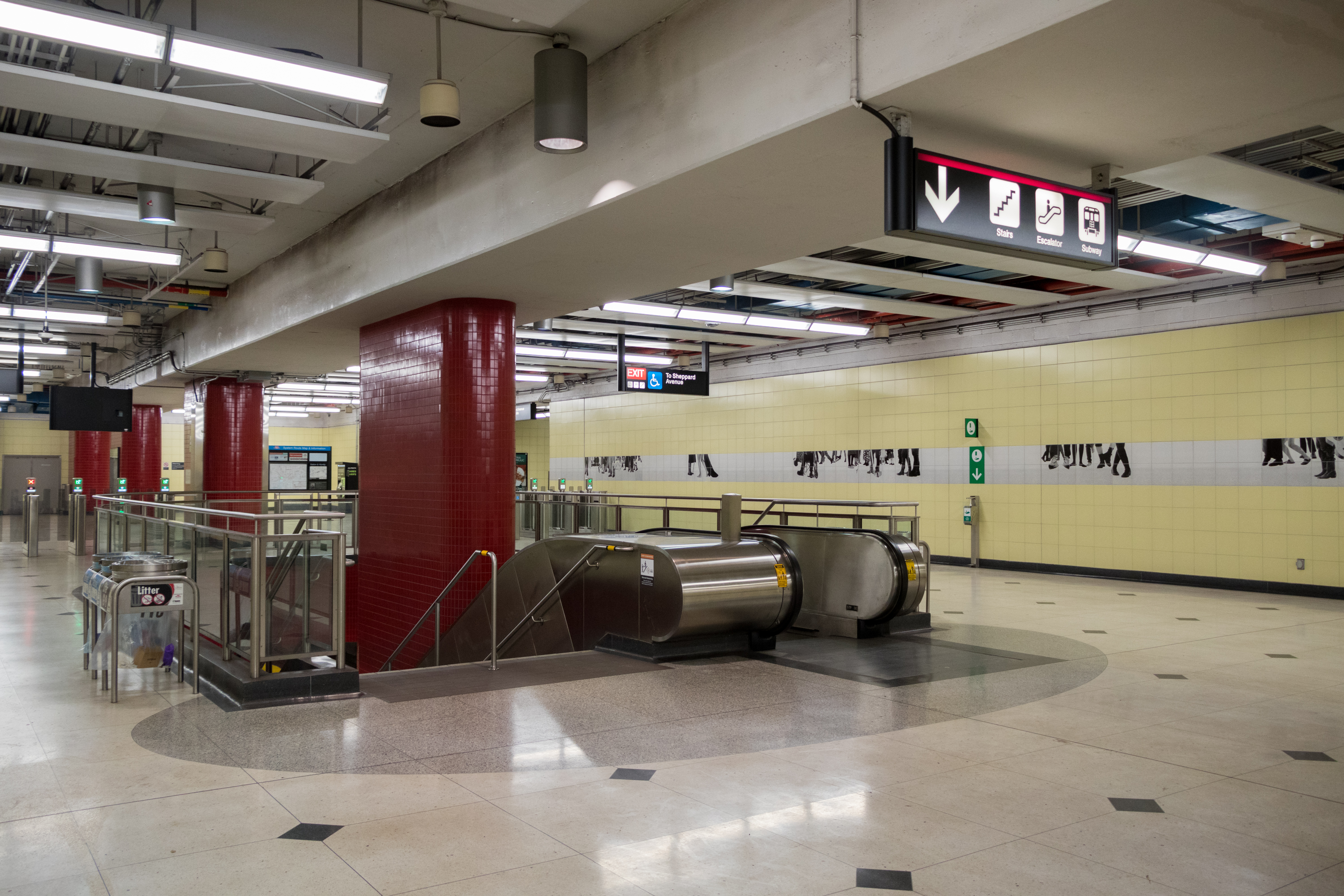
Concourse level

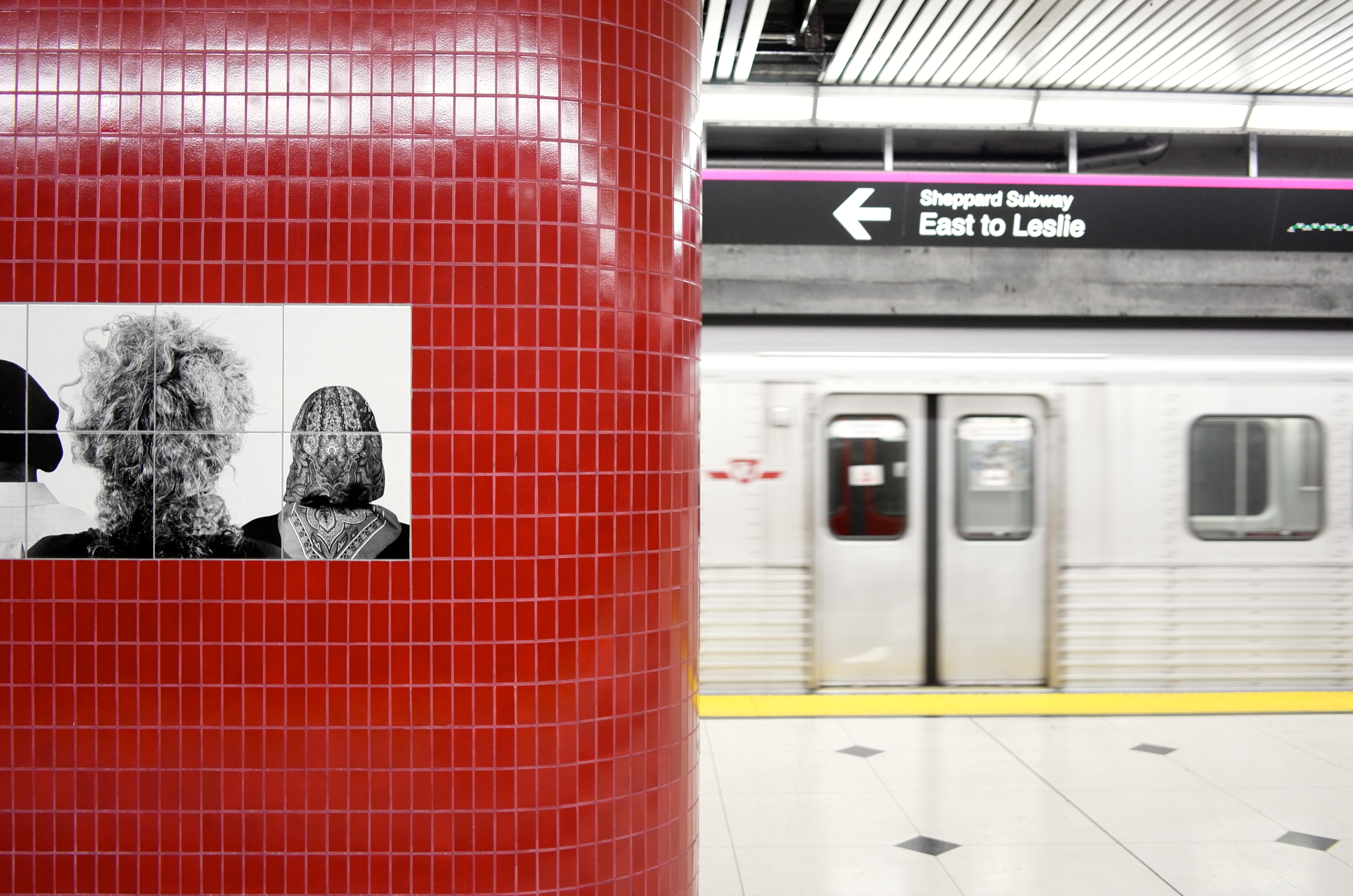
Back of heads at platform level

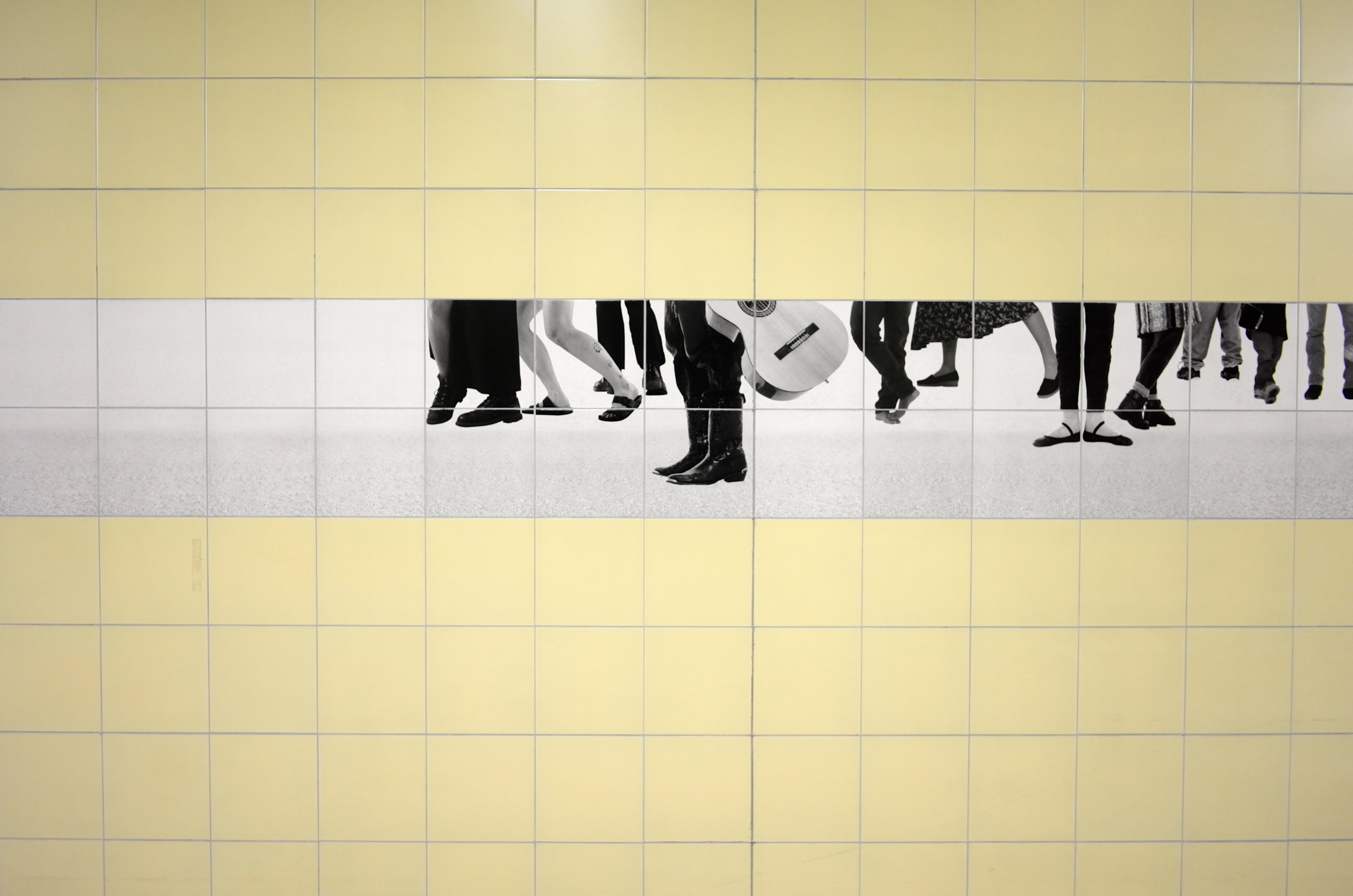
Feet and legs greet passengers at the concourse level

== Surface connections ==
There are no off-street bus platforms at this station. Connecting service is available at the bus stops on Sheppard Avenue with a valid transfer.

TTC routes serving the station include:

Route	Name	Additional information
185	Sheppard Central	Westbound to Sheppard–Yonge station and eastbound to Don Mills station
385	Sheppard East	Blue Night service; westbound to Sheppard–Yonge station and eastbound to Rouge Hill GO Station

== Nearby landmarks ==
Nearby landmarks include Ethennonnhawahstihnen' Park, the Ethennonnhawahstihnen' Community Recreation Centre and Library (part of the Concord Park Place development), the Bessarion Parkette, a Canadian Tire, and Mountain Equipment Co-op North York.
