= Layline =

Sailboat racing term

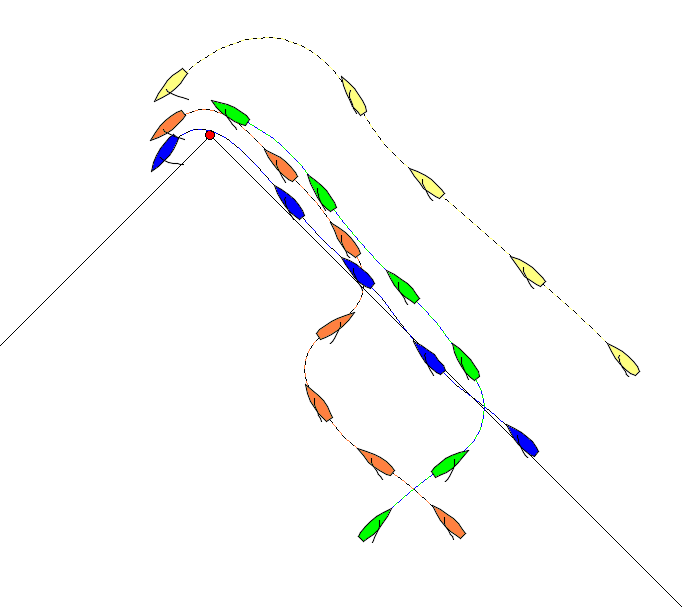
The black line is the layline

In sailboat racing, a layline is an imaginary line extending from the objective (typically a racing mark) to indicate the point at which a boat should tack or jibe in order to just clear the mark on the correct side (weather side if upwind tacking, leeward side if downwind jibing).
