= Leslie station =

Toronto subway station

Leslie
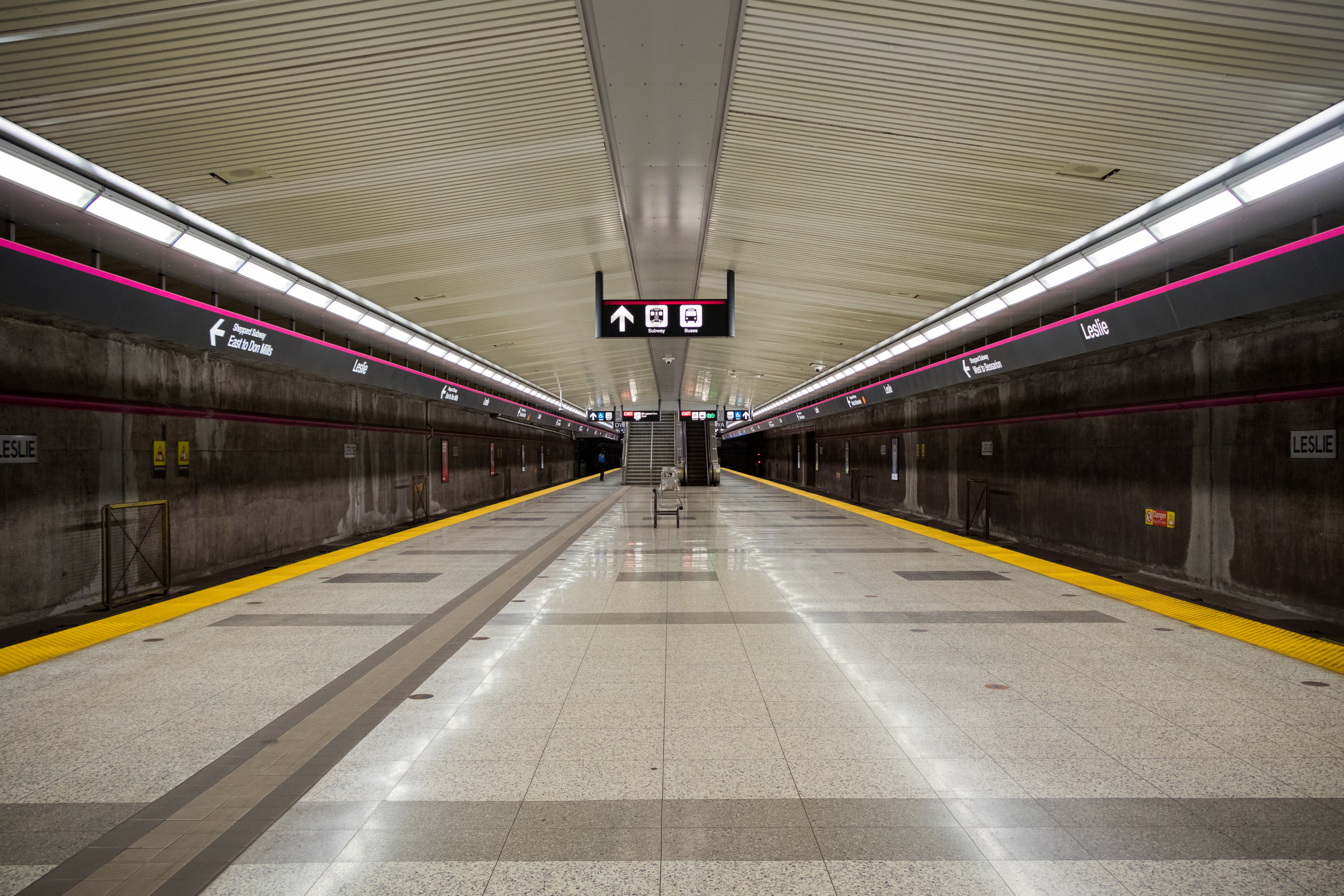
- Platform

General information
- Location: 1209 Sheppard Avenue East; Toronto, Ontario; Canada
- Coordinates: 43°46′16″N 79°21′56″W
- Platforms: Centre platform
- Tracks: 2
- Connections: TTC buses: 51 Leslie; 151 Leslie North; 185 Sheppard Central; 385 Sheppard East

Construction
- Structure type: Underground
- Parking: 102 spaces
- Accessible: Yes

Other information
- Website: Official station page

History
- Opened: November 24, 2002; 23 years ago

Passengers
- 2023–2024: 3,988
- Rank: 69 of 70

Services
Preceding station	Toronto Transit Commission	Following station
Bessarion towards Sheppard–Yonge	Line 4 Sheppard	Don Mills Terminus
Track layout
Location

Leslie is a Toronto subway station on Line 4 Sheppard. It is located at 1209 Sheppard Avenue East at Old Leslie Street (the original alignment of the station's namesake Leslie Street) in Toronto, Ontario, Canada. It was opened in 2002.

As of 2024, the station is the second least used on the heavy-rail subway system, with an average daily ridership of 3,988.

== History ==
Leslie station opened for public viewing on November 22, 2002, along with the rest of the Sheppard subway line and for revenue service on November 24, 2002.

On December 22, 2016, this station and Coxwell were the last subway stations to be equipped with Presto card readers.

== Station description ==
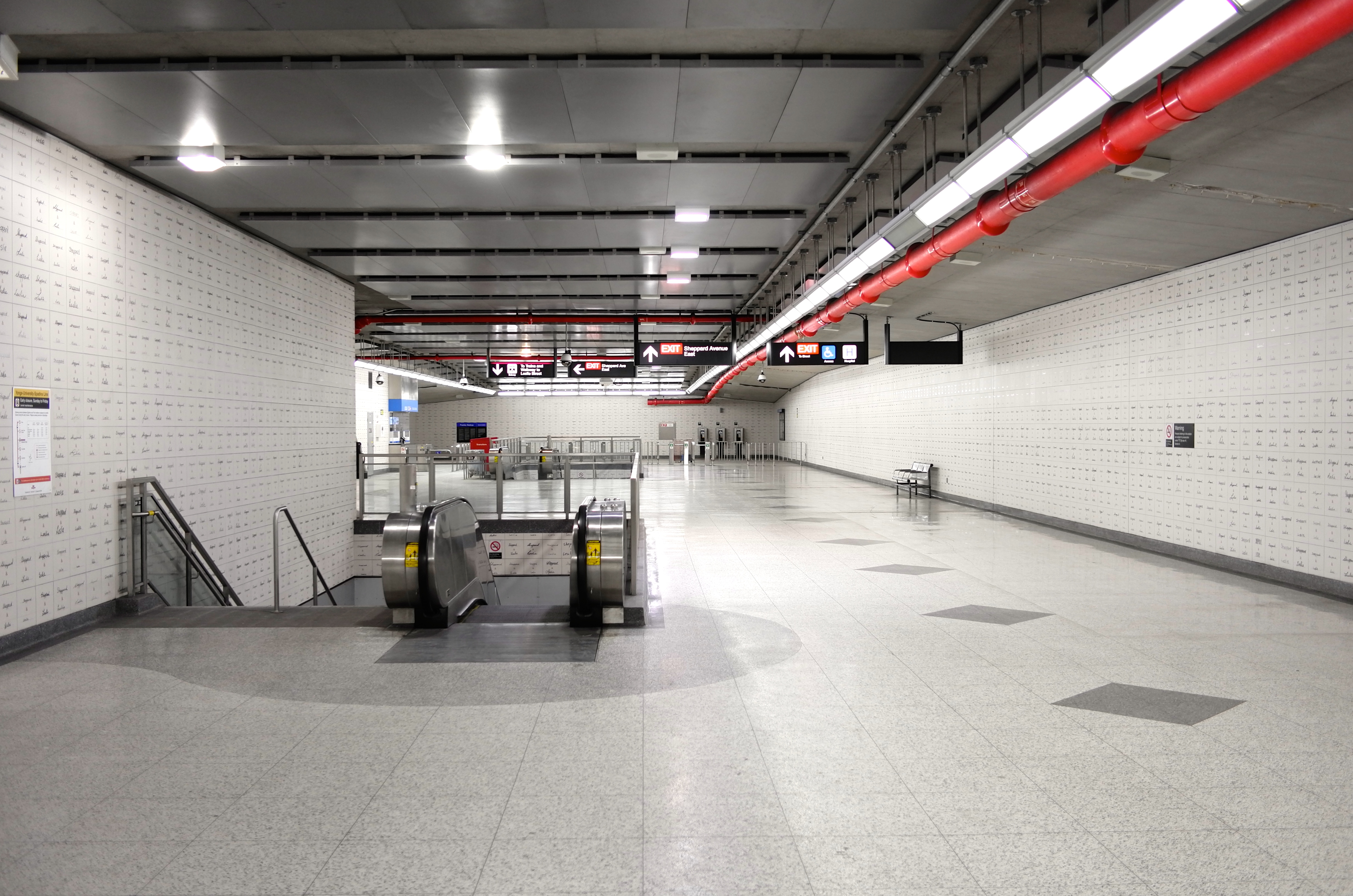
Mezzanine level of the station

The station is on three levels. The bus platforms are on the upper level at Old Leslie Street, with an automatic accessible entrance. The concourse and collector are at an intermediate level, where the main fully accessible entrance is located on the south side of Sheppard Avenue East west of Leslie Street. There is a secondary automatic accessible entrance at the corner of Leslie Street directly to the easterly end of the subway platform, which is at the lowest level.

The station features 102 spaces of commuter parking. Cost is $7 per day or $2 per hour from 5:00 am to 2:00 am daily. As with all TTC lots, no overnight parking is allowed between 2:00 am and 5:00 am.

== Architecture and art ==
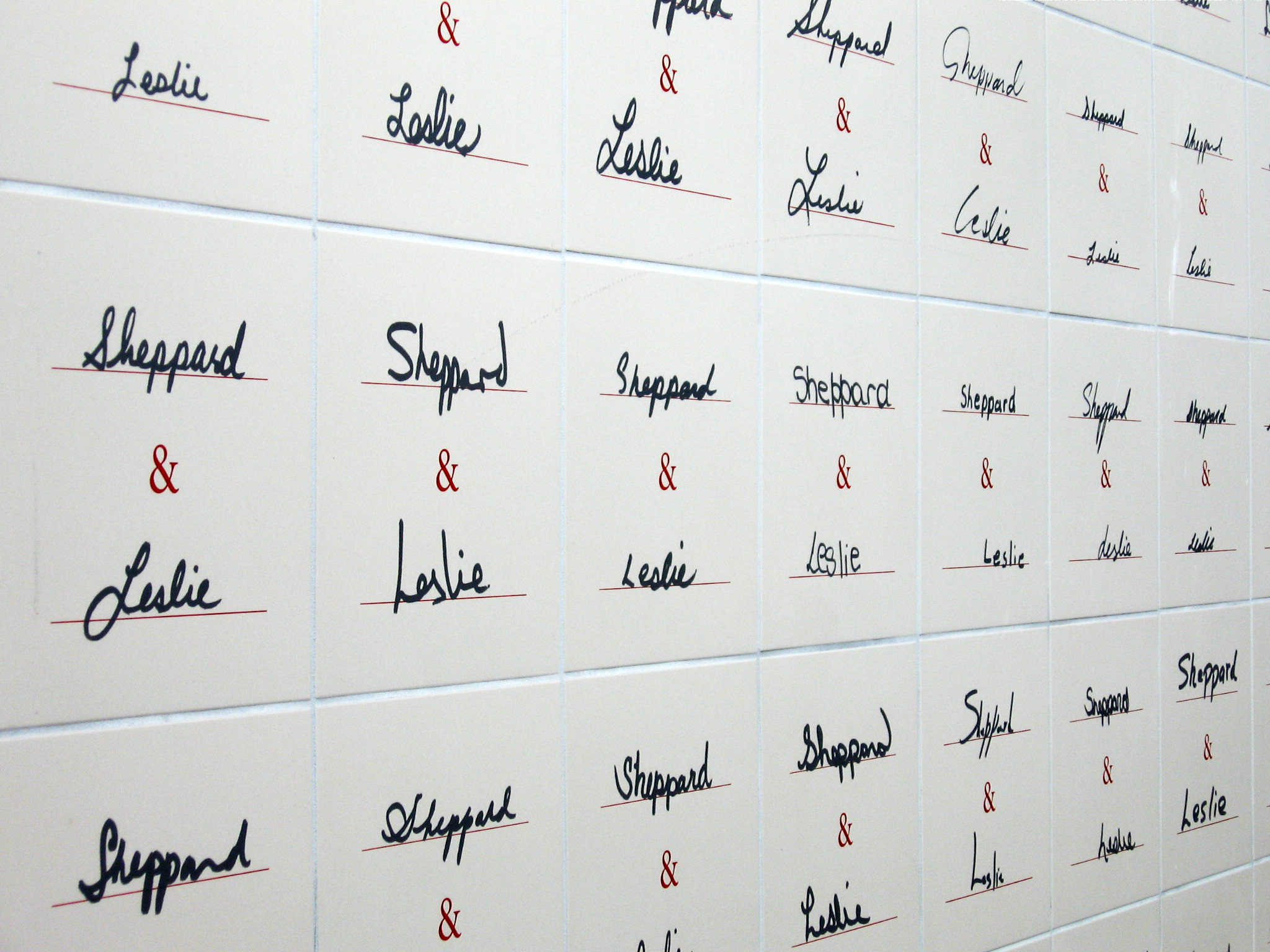
Lexier's Ampersand

Micah Lexier's public art installation Ampersand comprises 17,000 ceramic tiles that cover the walls of Leslie station. Each tile features a printed ampersand between the words "Sheppard" and "Leslie", based on a collection of 3,400 handwriting samples gathered in 1997 from a range of contributors, including local residents, schoolchildren, and TTC employees.

According to the artist's statement posted in the station, Ampersand "acknowledges the duality of being both an individual and part of a larger community". The artwork is integrated into the architecture of the concourse, platform, and bus terminal.

== Subway infrastructure in the vicinity ==
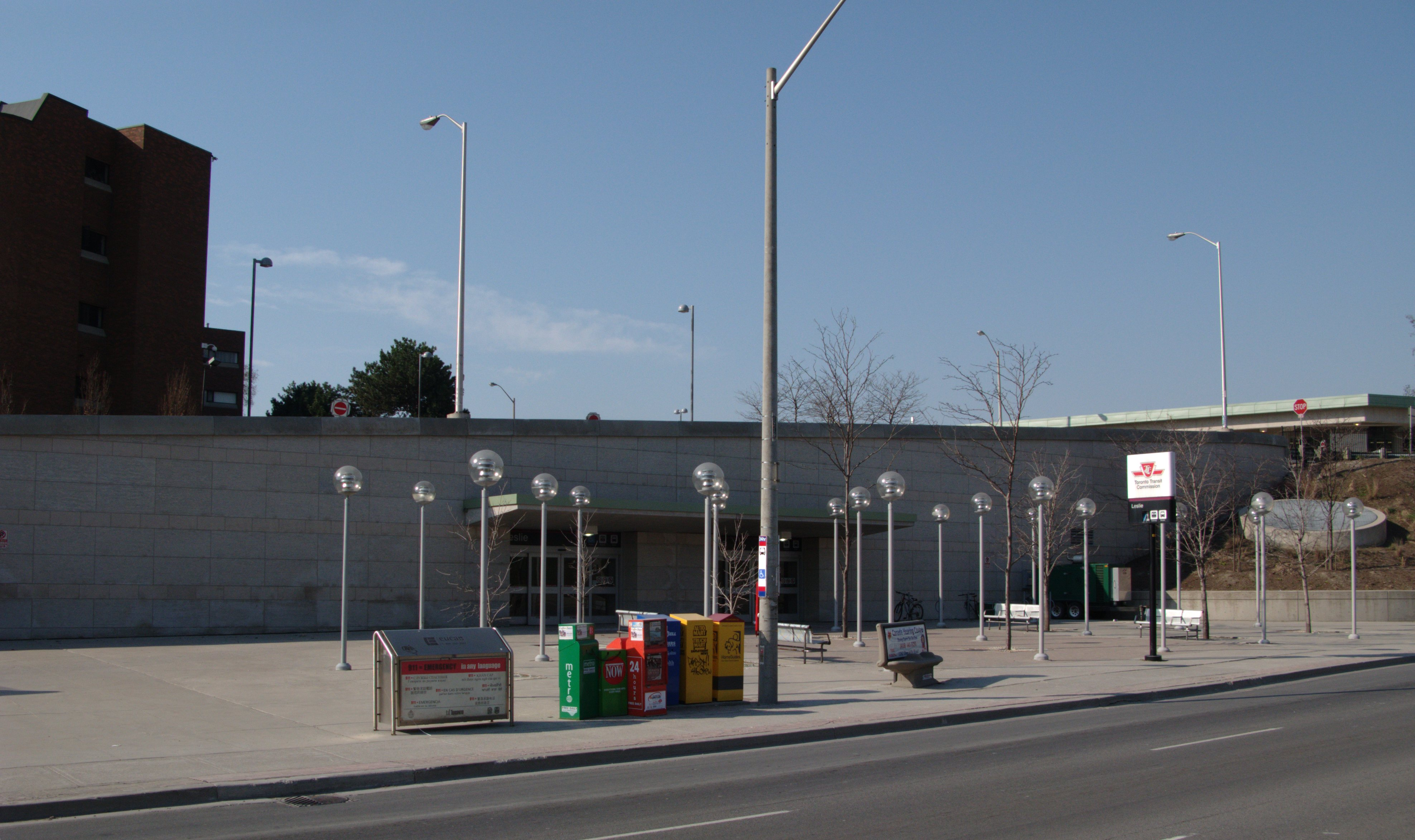
Exterior of the station

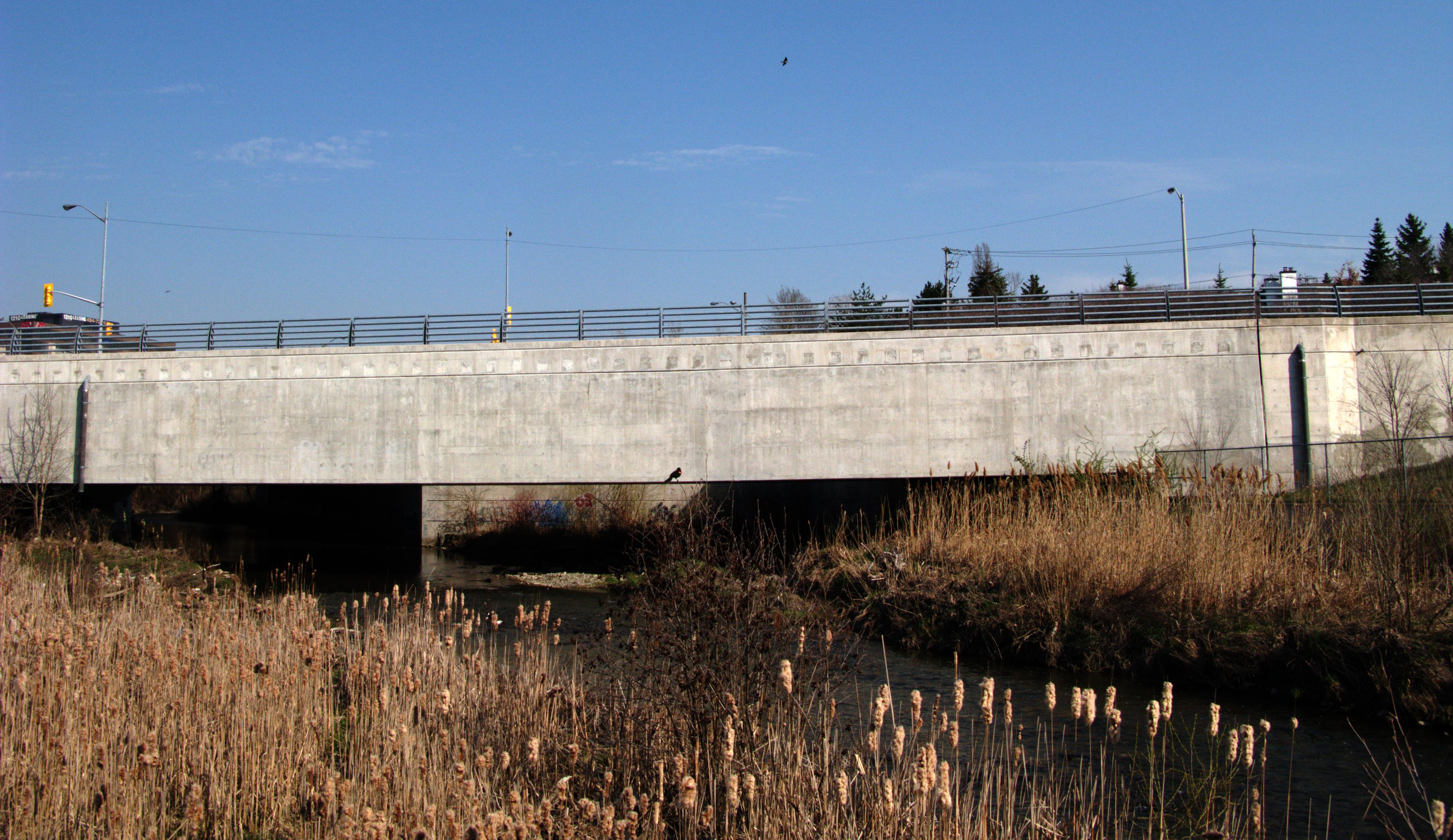
Enclosed bridge over the Don River

Just east of the station, the line emerges from the subway tunnel to cross the Don River East Branch on a fully enclosed bridge, then returns into the tunnel. West of the station, the subway continues through its tunnels into Bessarion station.

== Nearby landmarks ==
Nearby landmarks include the East Don River, IKEA North York, the Betty Sutherland Trail, North York General Hospital, and the Canadian College of Naturopathic Medicine (formerly Seneca College's School of Nursing).

== Surface connections ==
=== Toronto Transit Commission ===
A bus terminal, located one level above the concourse, serves Leslie station. Although the terminal has several bus bays, it currently only accommodates the 51 Leslie and the 151 Leslie North bus routes. The 185 and 385 Sheppard buses can only be boarded on the street with a valid transfer.

TTC routes serving the station include:

Bay number	Route	Name	Additional information
1	Spare		
2	51	Leslie	Southbound to Donlands station via Laird station
3	151	Leslie North	Northbound to Steeles Avenue East
4	Wheel-Trans		
N/A	185	Sheppard Central	Westbound to Sheppard–Yonge station and eastbound to Don Mills station
N/A	385	Sheppard East	Blue Night service; westbound to Sheppard–Yonge station and eastbound to Rouge Hill GO Station

=== GO Transit ===
Leslie station is located north of Oriole Station on GO Transit's Richmond Hill line, but they are not adjacent. No action has yet been taken on proposals to relocate the GO Station to connect directly with the subway. Passengers wishing to transfer to the GO Station are directed to the exit outside the bus terminal; a short walk to the intersection of Old Leslie Street and Esther Shiner Boulevard brings pedestrians to a walkway which connects to the north end of the GO platform.
