= Presto card =

Contactless smart card fare system in Ontario, Canada

- Presto farecard in 2019
- Location: Greater Toronto, Hamilton and Ottawa
- Launched: Q4 2009
- Technology: MiFare DESFire EV1 4k
- Operator: Accenture
- Manager: Metrolinx
- Currency: CAD ($0.05 minimum load, $500 maximum load)
- Stored-value: e-purse, period pass
- Credit expiry: None
- Auto recharge: Autoload
- Validity: Brampton Transit; Burlington Transit; Durham Region Transit; GO Transit; Hamilton Street Railway; MiWay (Missisauga); Oakville Transit; OC Transpo (Ottawa); Toronto Transit Commission; Union Pearson Express; York Region Transit
- Retailed: Online; Participating transit agencies
- Website: prestocard.ca

The Presto card (stylized as PRESTO) is a contactless smart card automated fare collection system used on participating public transit systems in various regions in Ontario, Canada, namely Greater Toronto, Hamilton, and Ottawa. Presto card readers were implemented on a trial basis from 25 June 2007 to 30 September 2008. Full implementation began in November 2009 and it was deployed at rapid transit stations, railway stations, bus stops and terminals, and on transit vehicles throughout eleven different transit systems.

A variant of the Presto card is the Presto ticket, introduced on 5 April 2019, which is a single-use paper ticket with an embedded chip. The Presto ticket can only be used for the services of the Toronto Transit Commission.

In late 2023 and mid-2024, Presto was made available for use in Google Wallet and Apple Wallet, respectively.

Presto is a result of The Big Move, the 2008 regional transportation plan for the Greater Toronto and Hamilton Area (GTHA), which had an integrated fare payment system as one of its strategies. Presto is an operating division of Metrolinx, the Ontario government agency that manages and integrates road transport and public transit in the GTHA.

== History ==
In 1998, GO Transit began work on a smart card system with ERG Transit Systems. A year-long pilot of the system on GO Transit's Richmond Hill line was scheduled to begin in the fourth quarter of 2000, but was delayed to June 2002. During the pilot, 4,000 people used the cards and a total of 10,000 cards were issued. That year, the Ministry of Transportation of Ontario (MTO), in conjunction with GO Transit and GTHA municipalities, began investigating the merits of a regional fare card, and it began development by June 2003.

GO did not continue its partnership with ERG after the pilot, preferring a more flexible system. Instead, GO opted to implement a different system in partnership with other Greater Toronto transit systems, though the TTC was not initially supportive of the proposed system. At the time, development was expected to take at least two years at a cost of CA$140 million. They developed the specifications of the system around 2004 and in October 2006, the Ministry of Transportation signed a 10-year, $250-million contract with Accenture to design, develop and operate the base Presto system for the GTHA. Two major transit agencies, OC Transpo and the Toronto Transit Commission (TTC), agreed to adopt the fare card system in 2007 and 2009 respectively. The larger anticipated userbase prompted the MTO to decide on developing a new system, called Presto Next Generation (PNG). The Auditor General of Ontario criticized this move, suggesting that the base Presto system should have been expanded to accommodate OC Transpo and the Toronto Transit Commission.

Thales Group and Accenture were awarded the contract to supply this system in October 2009. Implementation was the responsibility of Metrolinx, of which Presto became an operating division in 2011.

The Presto project was strongly criticized by the Auditor General of Ontario in 2012 for "roll-out glitches, cost escalations and untendered contract extensions" and warned the system could become the world's most expensive fare-card implementation project. Instead of putting the development Presto Next Generation out to competitive tender, Metrolinx simply increased the size of the original base contract awarded to Accenture in 2006. By 2012, the cost of the system ballooned to $700 million.

The Presto rollout on the TTC's surface transit fleet have been marred with abnormally high failure rates of the readers themselves and cost overruns. A TTC position paper noted that faulty Presto card readers used by fare inspectors on the proof-of-payment streetcar system was making it "difficult to get customers to comply with inspections" and costing the TTC in lost fare revenue.

A 3 June 2017 story in the Toronto Star first reported that customers' Presto travel histories were provided to police authorities 12 times in the previous year, with a warrant having been required for only two of those disclosures and customers typically not having been notified that their records had been shared. The figures were confirmed by Metrolinx in later reports, stating that they had granted 12 of 26 requests received from various police agencies. In response to calls for reforming the data sharing system from experts and transit riding advocates, Metrolinx launched a formal review of its privacy policies.

The rollout of the fare system and accompanying replacement fare gates on the TTC's subway network was met with poor reliability and issues with processing transactions. Presto was forced to use its existing software back-end for other municipal transit partners that have completed the roll-out, as the TTC has yet to develop its own dedicated infrastructure to process the larger volume of transactions it typically handles. The new fare gates suffered from persistent mechanical and software problems, prompting the TTC to suspend the rollout for a month to work with the contractor, Scheidt & Bachmann, to resolve reliability issues. As a result, over 2,000 motors on more than 1,000 gates had to be replaced in addition to numerous hardware and software updates. The June 2018 deadline for the complete roll-out of Presto for the TTC will be further pushed to 2019 due to these ongoing issues, prompting a delay in the phasing out of cash fares, tokens and other legacy fare media. As a result, the TTC will face higher fare collection costs as it incurs "transitional costs" of operating parts of Presto and the legacy fare regimes concurrently over the next few years. A situation TTC board member John Campbell describes as "totally inefficient".

In its annual report released in 2018, Metrolinx indicated it expected the cost of the Presto system to reach $1.2 billion, with $1 billion already spent in the development and implementation the system between 2002 and March 2018. While Presto was designed for complex fare transactions between GTA transit agencies, up until the fourth quarter of 2019, the system on TTC buses was not able to support the payment of special surcharges for TTC express downtown buses and TTC trips that enter Mississauga and York Region where a Miway or YRT fare was required. As of late 2018, the TTC Presto system at large continues to experience abnormally high failure rates. This led to an estimated loss of at least $3.4 million in revenue in 2018 alone according to the TTC. The 2018 Audit Work Plan by the auditor general of Ontario noted that the number of reports of Presto collection machines not functioning properly is likely under-counted and a breakdown in communication between Metrolinx, the TTC, and two of its vendors led to operational issues. This included a finding that over half the "out-of-service" incidents raised for the fare vending machines on the TTC's new Flexity streetcars are "coin or token box full" errors, the root cause being miscommunication between the TTC and Metrolinx on coin and token collection leading to the vending machines not being emptied frequently enough.

In early 2018, Metrolinx detailed a plan to increase transit ridership by use of a mobile app (available for Android and iOS devices) which it released to the public for testing in beta version in late 2018. The Presto app was released in January 2019, and allows transit users to reload their Presto card directly from their mobile device.

In August 2023, Metrolinx released updated versions of the Presto card reader that can support Interac credit and debit cards.

== Card use ==
Tapping a Presto card on a TTC streetcar

Presto cards are available to purchase at most Shoppers Drug Mart stores, transit centres in the GTHA and Ottawa, over the phone and online. Beginning in Stage 3, cardholders will also be able to load passes for up to three transit systems at a time on to their Presto card. When boarding, riders tap the prepaid card, embedded with an RFID chip, on to a reader. The reader will then check for either a valid transit pass, or automatically deduct the lowest available fare from the card's balance stored in its e-purse ("stored balance"). GO Transit and Union Pearson Express (UP Express or UPX) riders – whose fares are calculated by distance – and those riding TTC buses which travel into the City of Mississauga or York Region must also tap their cards at the end of their trip. Since the TTC joined Ontario's One Fare Program on 26 February 2024, no extra fare is charged if a rider taps off after crossing the fare zone boundary aboard a TTC bus within 2 hours (or 3 hours if GO Transit was used).

Presto readers show a large white check mark on a green background (if accepted) or a large white "X" on a red background (if declined), accompanied by one of several messages. For monthly, weekly and single-day transit passes, the expiry date is shown. For a stored-balance fare at initial tap-on, the reader shows the fare deducted, balance remaining, and transfer period allowed. For subsequent taps within the transfer window, the transfer time remaining is shown. GO Transit and Union Pearson Express readers, at both tap-on and tap-off, also shows much of the same information as those of a local system for a stored-balance fare at initial tap-on.

Fare capping is also available on some transit systems, where transit rides become free after a certain number of paid trips using the same electronic payment method in a week or month depending on the transit system the customer is travelling with.

The Presto card works on several transit systems and has other features:

- Autoload: The autoload feature allows cardholders to have a predetermined value automatically loaded onto their Presto card, when the stored balance value reaches a specified threshold. It will charge the cardholder's credit or debit card.
- Autorenew, for monthly passes: Six days before the end of each month, the next month's pass is automatically loaded onto the card. The new pass becomes effective the first day of the new month. Payment is charged as for an autoload.
- Lost card replacement: If a registered cardholder loses their Presto card, they can have their lost card blocked immediately upon reporting the loss, and the remaining balance transferred to a replacement card.
- Underpayment allowance: If a registered card has insufficient funds to pay a fare, but the balance is greater than $0 and has sufficient funds to cover the minimum base fare, the cardholder can incur a negative balance for one trip. This previously carried a fee of $0.25; however, this fee was dropped in November 2020.
- Transit usage reports: Through an online account, a user can track transit usage, customize the data, and download it to a spreadsheet in CSV format.

A Braille letter "P" was placed on the Presto card to help distinguish it from other cards in a wallet, after consultation with feedback from visually impaired customers.

Presto cards purchased from the Presto website or from automated self-service vending machines are set to the adult fare rates. For concessionary fares (such as child, senior, youth or post-secondary student), one must present the Presto card in-person at either a transit customer service centre or at many Shoppers Drug Mart locations to have the concession fare rate set.

=== Mobile wallets ===
On 14 November 2023, Metrolinx made Presto cards available in Google Wallet. On 16 July 2024, Metrolinx made Presto cards available in Apple Wallet.

Presto cards in mobile wallets can be used on all transit systems which support physical Presto cards except OC Transpo in Ottawa. Creation of a virtual card can be done through a mobile wallet's app or the Presto app at no cost. In addition, the settings and the balance of a physical Presto card can be transferred to a virtual card. This includes concession fare types (excluding the child fare type, which currently only remains available on physical Presto cards). The physical card will be cancelled after the transfer. Concession fares can be set on the virtual cards through the same methods as a physical card.

== Participation ==
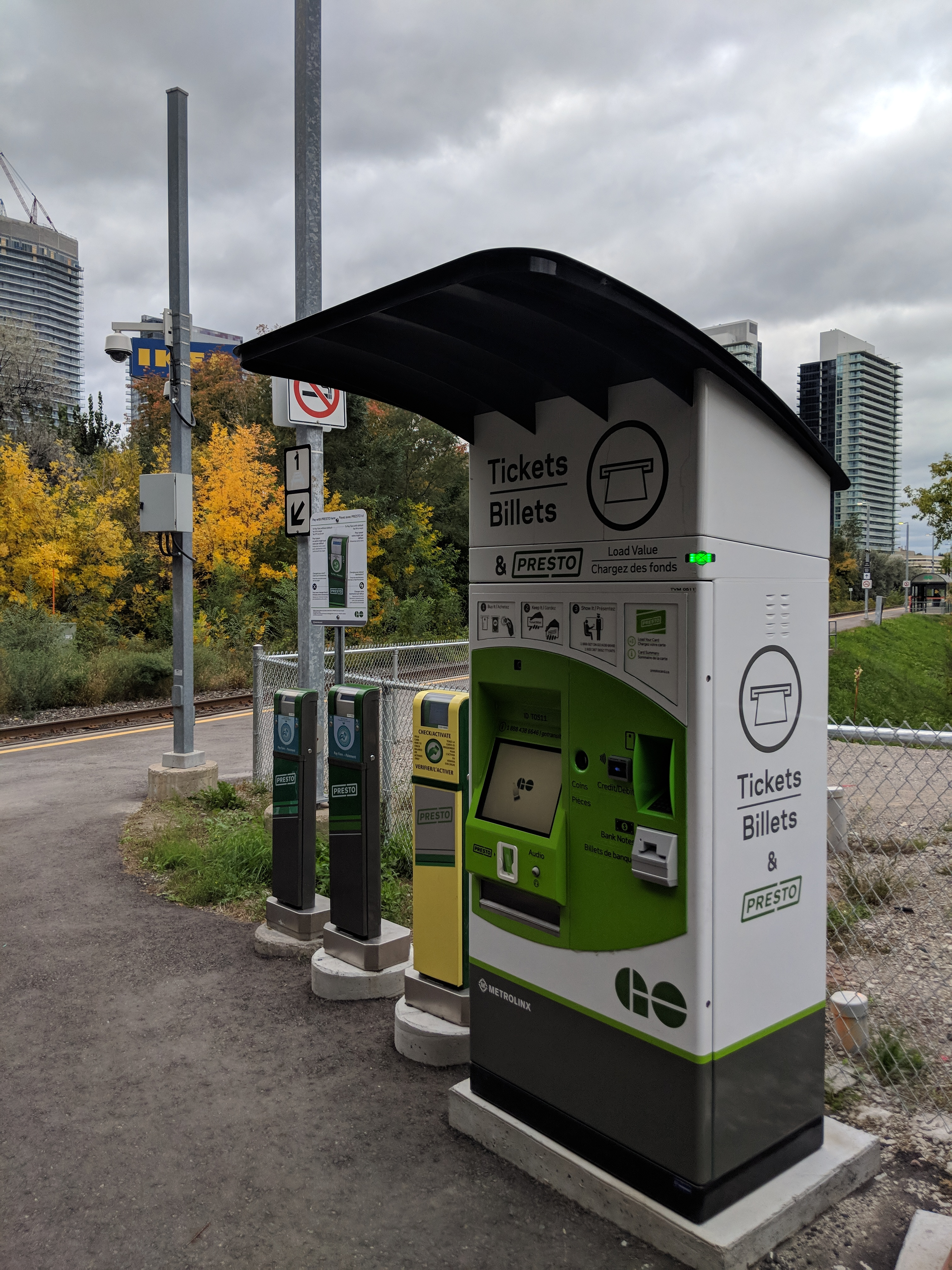
Presto card readers and self-serve vending machine at Oriole GO Station

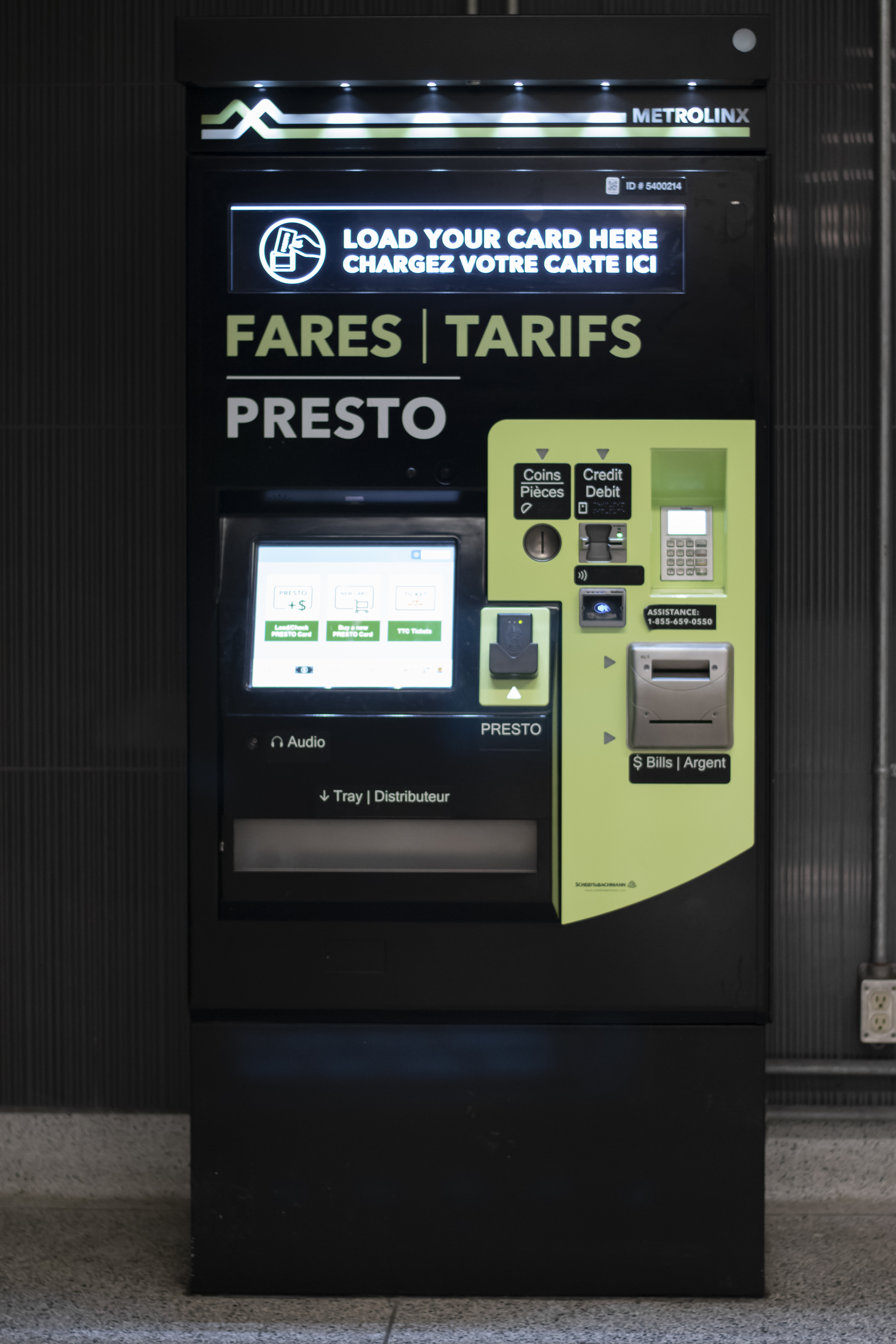
Presto card readers and self-serve vending machine at Victoria Park station

The following transit service providers use Presto:

- Brampton Transit
- Burlington Transit
- Durham Region Transit
- GO Transit
- Hamilton Street Railway
- MiWay (Mississauga)
- Oakville Transit
- OC Transpo (Ottawa)
- Toronto Transit Commission
- Union Pearson Express
- York Region Transit

The following transit service providers accept Presto for free transfers but not for purchasing fares:

- Barrie Transit
- Bradford West Gwillimbury Transit
- Grand River Transit
- Guelph Transit
- Milton Transit
- Niagara Falls Transit
- Société de transport de l'Outaouais (Gatineau, QC)

=== Rollout ===
In July 2007, 500 commuters who normally commuted from Meadowvale and Cooksville GO stations in Mississauga to Union Station in downtown Toronto received a free card and tried the system under a trial termed "Launch 1". Officials decided to test the fare system on Mississauga's neighbourhood shuttle service in Meadowvale and Cooksville that transports passengers to GO Transit. During the Launch 1 trial, the Presto card could be used at:

- Miway (shuttle routes of 60 Meadowvale Shuttle-Crosscurrent, 62 Cooksville Shuttle-Webb, 63 Cooksville Shuttle-Kaneff, 64 Meadowvale Shuttle-Montevideo only)
- GO Transit (Meadowvale and Cooksville GO stations only)
- Toronto Transit Commission (Union subway station only)

The Launch 1 trial concluded 30 September 2008.

The Presto card was introduced in stages beginning in the fourth quarter of 2009.

Presto card rollout (detailed table)

Stage	Date	GO Transit	Local systems
One (field trial)	30 November 2009	Union, Oakville, and Bronte stations	TTC subway station: Union; Oakville Transit routes: 22: Upper Glen Abbey; 32: Burloak North; 110: West Industrial North
Two	May 2010	Lakeshore West rail line: 10 May: Oakville GO Station; 17 May: Bronte GO Station; 24 May: Appleby GO Station; 31 May: Burlington GO Station	TTC subway stations: Bloor–Yonge; College; Dundas; Queen's Park; St. George; St. Patrick; 10 May: Adult fares for: Oakville Transit; Burlington Transit
Two	June 2010	Lakeshore West rail line: 7 June: Aldershot, Hamilton GO Centre; 17 June: Clarkson GO Station; 24 June: Port Credit GO Station; 30 June: Long Branch GO Station	
Two	July 2010	Lakeshore West rail line: 7 July: Mimico GO Station; 14 July: Exhibition GO Station; Milton rail line: 28 July: Milton GO station	26 July: TTC subway stations: Islington; Kipling
Two	August 2010	Milton rail line: 9 August: Lisgar GO Station; 13 August: Meadowvale GO Station; 19 August: Streetsville GO Station; 23 August: Dixie GO Station; 30 August: Kipling GO Station	
Two	September 2010	Milton rail line: 23 September: Cooksville GO Station; 24 September: Erindale GO Station	
Two	October 2010	Georgetown (Note: Now known as the Kitchener line) rail line: 6 October: Mount Pleasant GO Station; 14 October: Etobicoke North GO Station; 19 October: Malton GO Station	
Two	November 2010	Georgetown rail line: 11 November: Bloor GO Station; 17 November: Weston GO Station	
Three	December 2010	Lakeshore East rail line: 20 December: Ajax GO Station; 23 December: Danforth GO Station	TTC subway stations: 7 December: Don Mills; 23 December: Sheppard West
Three	January 2011	System-wide: Concession fares; Georgetown rail line: 11 January: Bramalea GO Station; 18 January: Georgetown GO Station; Lakeshore East rail line: 17 January: Oshawa GO Station; 19 January: Eglinton GO Station; 25 January: Rouge Hill GO Station; 27 January: Guildwood GO Station	3 January: Concession fares for: Burlington Transit; Oakville Transit; 25 January: Finch subway station; MiWay routes: 32: Lisgar GO; 62: Cooksville Shuttle – Webb; 64: Meadowvale Shuttle – Montevideo
Three	February 2011	Lakeshore East rail line: 3 February: Whitby GO Station; Barrie rail line: 16 February: Barrie South GO Station; East Gwillimbury GO Station; 17 February: Bradford GO Station; 22 February: King City GO Station	
Three	March 2011	Barrie rail line: 2 March: York University GO Station; 7 March: Newmarket GO Station; 11 March: Rutherford GO Station; 15 March: Maple GO Station; 17 March: Aurora GO Station; Lakeshore East rail line: 3 March: Scarborough GO Station; Richmond Hill rail line: 22 March: Langstaff GO Station; 24 March: Oriole GO Station; 29 March: Old Cummer GO Station; Stouffville rail line: 31 March: Kennedy station	
Three	April 2011	Stouffville rail line: 18 April: Centennial GO Station; 21 April: Agincourt GO Station; Richmond Hill rail line: 20 April: Richmond Hill GO Station	
Three	May 2011	Stouffville rail line: 11 May: Old Elm GO Station; 18 May: Unionville GO Station; 19 May: Mount Joy GO Station; 20 May: Markham GO Station; 24 May: Stouffville GO Station; 30 May: Milliken GO Station	4 May: Hamilton Street Railway; 30 May: adult fares for MiWay; Brampton Transit
Three	June 2011	Lakeshore East rail line: 2 June: Pickering GO Station	27 June: co-fares for Durham Region Transit
Three	July 2011	Georgetown rail line: 13 July: Brampton GO Station	18 July: York Region Transit
Three	August 2011	Lakeshore West rail line: 5 August: Niagara Falls VIA Station; St. Catharines VIA Station; System-wide: 23 August: GO Transit buses	
Three	Q4 2011		Concession fares for MiWay (soft launch)
Three	February 2012	Barrie rail line: 21 February: Allandale Waterfront GO Station; Kitchener rail line: 21 February: Kitchener GO Station; Guelph Central GO Station	GO Bus co-fares for MiWay (Note: Exclusive for Presto cardholders only)
Three	March 2012		17 March: Yorkdale subway station; 26 March: York Mills subway station; GO Bus co-fares for Brampton Transit
Three	2013		regular fares for Durham Region Transit
Four	Q2 2013		OC Transpo
Four	2014		Q4: Spadina subway station; November: 510 Spadina (only on Flexity Outlook vehicles)
Four	2015		29 March: 509 Harbourfront (only on Flexity Outlook vehicles); 6 June: Union Pearson Express; TTC subway stations: Bathurst; Dundas West; Davisville; King; Queen; Sheppard–Yonge; Broadview; St. Andrew; Osgoode; Scarborough Centre; Toronto streetcar system
Four	2016	Richmond Hill rail line: 5 December: Gormley GO Station	Wheel-Trans; Across the Toronto Transit Commission bus system by stage: 31 May: Queensway; August: Wilson and Arrow Road; October: Malvern and Mount Dennis; December: Birchmount and Eglinton; TTC subway stations: Wilson; Lawrence West; Glencairn; Eglinton West; St. Clair West; Dupont; Wellesley; Rosedale; St. Clair; Eglinton; Lawrence; North York Centre; Bayview; Bessarion; Leslie; McCowan; Midland; Ellesmere; Lawrence East; Kennedy; Warden; Victoria Park; Main Street; Woodbine; Coxwell; Greenwood; Donlands; Pape; Chester; Castle Frank; Sherbourne; Bay; Museum; Christie; Ossington; Dufferin; Lansdowne; Keele; High Park; Runnymede; Jane; Old Mill; Royal York
Four	17 December 2017		TTC subway stations: Downsview Park; Finch West; York University; Pioneer Village; Highway 407; Vaughan
	2019		29 July: Paying MiWay fares with a Presto card on TTC routes in Mississauga (52B/D Lawrence West); 26 August: Paying YRT fares with a Presto card on TTC routes in York Region (17A Birchmount, 68B Warden, 102D Markham Road, 129A McCowan North, 160 Bathurst North); Paying the full-double fare with a Presto card on the TTC's Downtown Express routes

==== Stage 1 ====
The first stage of the production rollout schedule was launched on 30 November 2009 and included a limited number of recruited customers to test the system. Stage One included Oakville, Bronte and Union GO Stations, TTC Union Subway Station, and ten Oakville Transit buses on three routes.

==== Stage 2 ====
The second stage of the production rollout schedule was launched on 10 May 2010. In this stage, the Presto system became available to the general public and transit users were able to purchase Presto cards and use them at participating stations and transit systems. Stage Two was launched similarly to Stage One, but with full participation from Oakville Transit and Burlington Transit. GO Transit continued its system-wide rollout, with the Lakeshore East, Milton and Georgetown lines coming online at a rate of a few stations a week. The Toronto Transit Commission added six downtown stations (St. George, Queen's Park, St. Patrick, Dundas, College, Bloor/Yonge) to the Presto system. Two more stations (Kipling and Islington) were added in mid-2010. The third stage of the production rollout schedule was scheduled for the fourth quarter of 2010 to bring more transit systems and stations into the Presto system.

==== Stage 3 ====
The third stage of the rollout schedule expanded the rollout to a larger scale, covering the entire 905 region and Hamilton. GO Transit completed its rollout for trains and buses in mid-2012. Since then, all new GO Train stations and buses have had Presto readers on the first day of service.

In the end of this stage, all but two local transit systems had completed their rollout. Hamilton Street Railway was the first to roll out in this stage on 3 May 2011. Brampton Transit became fully Presto-enabled on 30 May 2011. On the same date, MiWay made the farecard available to adult passengers only. Durham Region Transit launched Presto card for co-fares with GO Transit on 27 June 2011. Almost a month later, York Region Transit launched the Presto card in all of its Vivastations and buses. The TTC added Presto card as fare payment option in Don Mills, Downsview, Finch, Yorkdale and York Mills subway stations. In this stage, concession fares were added for GO Transit, Oakville Transit, Burlington Transit, Brampton Transit, York Region Transit and MiWay; and co-fares for GO buses have been offered by MiWay and Brampton Transit exclusively for Presto cardholders. Also in this stage, only Durham Region Transit remains to roll out its regular fares.

Presto's self-service kiosks debuted at Union Station for a pilot project during this period. Reception of the pilot kiosks was found to be favourable. The pilot kiosks have since been removed and a widespread rollout of automated reload systems is ongoing throughout GO, TTC, and Union Pearson Express stations.

==== Stage 4 and Presto Next Generation ====
The fourth stage of the rollout added Ottawa's OC Transpo, commencing as a soft launch in the second quarter of 2012 and as a full rollout on 18 May 2013. It is the only agency to receive the Presto card so far outside the Greater Toronto and Hamilton area. This stage involved the initial rollout of Presto Next Generation (PNG). OC Transpo's Presto readers are compatible with the Société de transport de l'Outaouais's new Multi farecards and Presto cards are compatible with pass readers on STO buses, thus facilitating transfers between the two.

Stage Four also marked the extensive rollout of the Presto fare system on the TTC, also using the Presto Next Generation system, while the participating transit systems that had already fully launched Presto in its earlier stages were to receive Presto Next Generation cards late in the fourth quarter of 2012. Payment by other means, such as open payment and mobile payment systems, will also be made compatible with this updated version of Presto card.

Stage Four and Presto Next Generation had been criticized for numerous delays with launching OC Transpo service. Metrolinx set 1 July 2012 as the Presto launch date for Ottawa, but in June 2012, it was postponed to 1 February 2013. City staff decided to launch Presto in several stages for 2013, the last of which occurred on 18 May 2013.

The first major addition of Presto on the TTC took place in the fourth quarter of 2014, with the introduction of Presto card machines in several more Toronto subway stations, and the launch of new streetcars equipped with this system (see below).

=== Expansion ===
- Toronto Transit Commission: Expansions in the TTC will be Presto-equipped from their opening day, which includes Line 5 Eglinton and Line 6 Finch West.
- GO Transit: All future GO stations will be Presto-equipped as early as the station opening.
- Other transit systems: Requirements are being developed in order to incorporate additional transit agencies into Presto card. Many transit systems in the Greater Golden Horseshoe have expressed interest in adopting the Presto card as a fare payment system:
  - Milton Transit, the only transit system in the Greater Toronto Area that has not participated during the first phase, is working with Metrolinx to adopt the farecard.
  - Guelph Transit is exploring its options in adopting the Presto card as a fare payment system.
  - Grand River Transit expressed interest in participating with the rollout of the Presto card but now has decided to go to another system.
  - Negotiations with Barrie Transit are ongoing with regards to the adoption of Presto card.
  - Niagara Falls Transit's new fareboxes are designed to be capable of handling Presto cards, and are now participating for those transferring from a GO Bus or Train.
  - Discussions in St. Catharines Transit are underway for participation in Presto.
  - Niagara Region Transit's operators are also interested in adopting the farecard.

== Fares ==
Participating transit systems have different fares and fare policies when using the Presto card compared to traditional fare media; generally, passengers receive a discount using Presto compared to cash fares. The implementation of the Presto card has also unified the fare categories of GO Transit and local transit agencies, with local transit agencies adopting the GO Transit standard: local transit agencies used to have different age limits for child and senior fares and different types of students that may use student fares (some excluding post-secondary students while others do not). Registered Presto card holders are assessed the senior or child fares as appropriate. Student fare classification must be activated by the card-issuing transit authority through its normal procedures, which differ between transit systems. For example, post-secondary student fares are classified as students in only GO Transit and MiWay, while the rest classify them under the adult category.

Agency	Adult	Senior	Child	Youth	GO co-fare	Upfront period pass	Loyalty / fare capping program	Notes
Brampton Transit	$3.55	$1.85	$2.00	$2.95	Free	Yes	Yes	Passengers taking more than 12 non-co-fare trips in a calendar week (Monday to Sunday) may ride the system for free for the remainder of the week. Brampton senior residents aged 65 and older ride free with a valid Presto card.
Burlington Transit	$2.85	Free	Free	$2.00	Free	No	Yes	Passengers taking more than 40 non-co-fare trips in a calendar month ride the system for free for the remainder of the month. With a Presto card, seniors age 65 and older ride free, while teenagers can ride fare-free from 6 pm until end of service on weekdays and all-day on weekends.
Durham Region Transit	$3.78	$2.46	Free	$3.36	Free	Yes	No	
GO Transit	$3.70*	$1.97*	Free	$3.40*	—N/a	No	Yes	Minimum fare required to begin travel. * GO Transit fares depend on originating and destination fare zones and must be tapped on when starting travel and tapped off upon completion of travel on a GO. Fare adjustments will be reconciled upon tapping off. Users can set a default trip, usually a daily commute, requiring tap-on only. For trips other than the default, a user can push an override button on the reader before tapping on and must tap off at the other end. Doing so will reset the card to the default trip. Children ages 12 and under, along with veterans and Canadian Armed Forces members, ride fare-free on GO Transit.
Hamilton Street Railway	$2.80	$2.35	Free (Note: Free fares for children ages 6–12 years are only applicable to those using the child concession Presto card. Those travelling without a Presto card are charged the full cash fare of $3.75. As with all other GTHA transit systems, children ages 5 and under can ride fare-free without a Presto card when travelling with an accompanying adult.)	$2.35	Free	Yes	Yes	All HSR passes, except 72 hour passes, may be stored as period passes on the Presto card. Passengers taking more than 11 non-co-fare trips in a calendar week (Monday to Sunday) may ride the system for free for the remainder of the week. Hamilton residents age 80+ ride free with a valid Presto card.
MiWay (Mississauga)	$3.50	Free	Free	$2.90	Free	Yes	Yes	Passengers taking more than 11 non-co-fare trips in a calendar week (Monday to Sunday) may ride the system for free for the remainder of the week. Seniors aged 65 and up and Canadian Armed Forces members must use a Presto card to ride fare-free, otherwise they will need to pay $4.50 using cash or with a contactless credit or debit card. Children aged 12 and under ride fare-free by tapping a Presto card or by travelling with an accompanying adult.
Oakville Transit	$3.50	Free	Free	Free	Free	Yes	No	A valid Presto card is required for youths and seniors in order to take advantage of the fare-free programs, those without a Presto card must pay their $4.00 fare by cash or with a contactless credit or debit card. Children aged 12 and under ride fare-free by tapping the child Presto card or by travelling with an accompanying adult.
OC Transpo (Ottawa)	$4.10	$3.28	Free*	$4.10	No	Yes	Yes	Youth passengers aged 13-18 are offered a discounted monthly pass. Children aged 10 and under ride free, while those aged 11–12 pay a pre-teen fare of $2.05. Passengers aged 18 and under ride fare-free on evenings (after 5pm), weekends and holidays using a Presto card with an age-based discount programmed on the Presto card.
Toronto Transit Commission	$3.30	$2.25	Free	$2.35	Free	Yes (Note: As of 1 September 2026 the TTC replaced most standard upfront monthly pass programs with an automatic monthly fare capping system which will cap fares at 47 rides and provide free travel for the remainder of the month after paying 47 fares in a calendar month when using the same Presto card, credit card or debit card. However the day pass, adult 12-month pass and post-secondary student monthly passes remain available for purchase. (See Toronto Transit Commission fares for details))	Yes	Presto fares are $0.05 less than cash fare. Since early 2018, those with disabilities or who are low-income are eligible for the Fair Pass discount, which allows those with the discount to pay a $2.10 fare instead.
Union Pearson Express	$9.25*	$5.80*	Free	$7.41*	No	No	No	Price listed is for travel between Pearson and Union stations. Lower fares apply for travel to Weston or Bloor station. Separate fares are charged for all customers transferring between UP Express and other transit systems.
York Region Transit	$4.12	$2.52	$2.52	$3.19	Free	No	Yes	Presto card customers riding on TTC buses operating in York Region (north of Steeles Avenue) are charged at the YRT Presto fare rate. YRT discontinued the sale and use of monthly passes from January 2024 onwards. It was replaced by a monthly fare capping system only available on the Presto card, where adults get free travel after 40 consecutive fare-paid trips in the calendar month, after 39 trips for youths and after 28 trips for seniors and children.

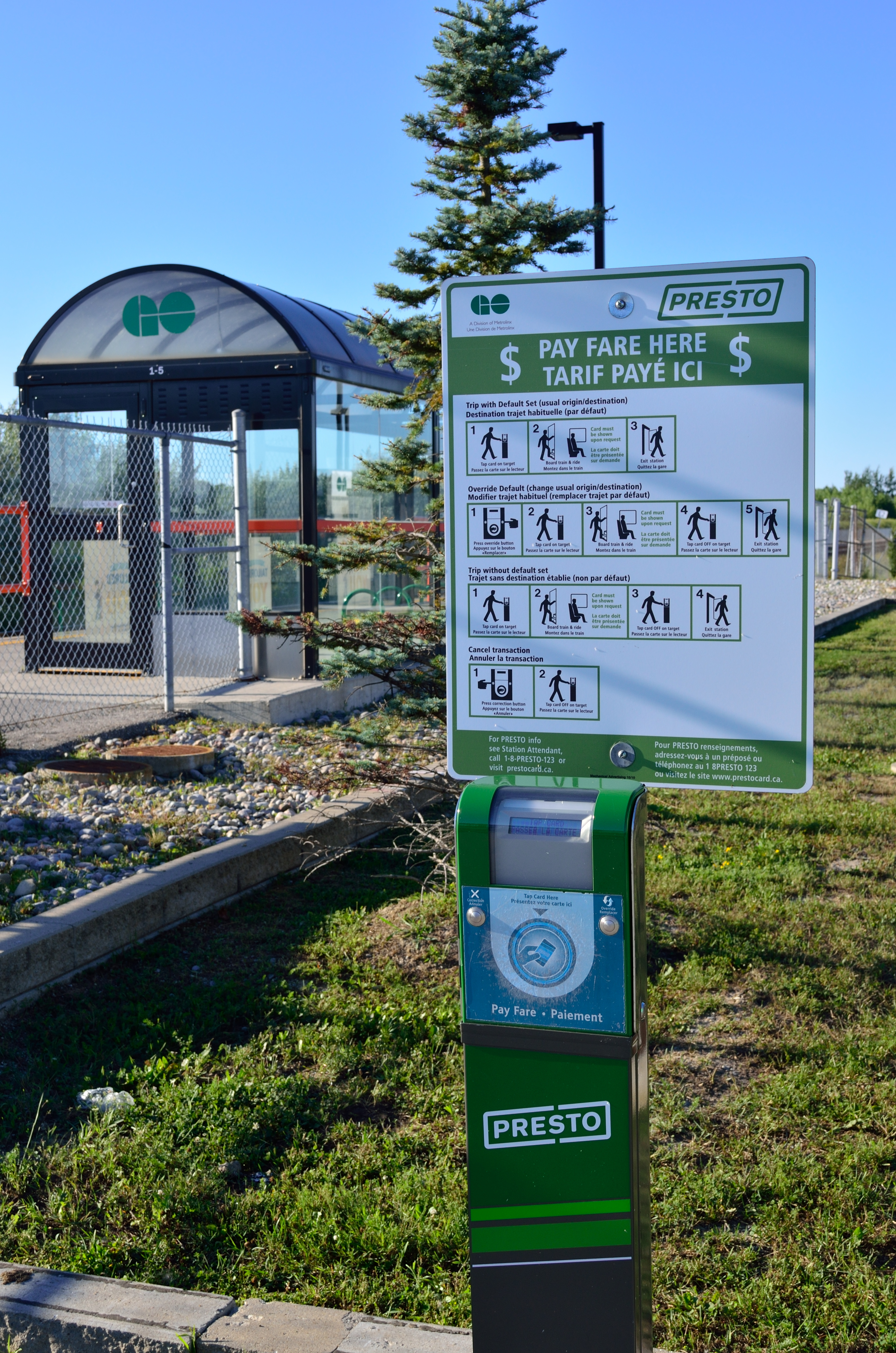
Presto reader at Unionville GO Station

Other Presto card fare notes:

- GO Transit: Fares for adult and student passengers between two fare zones are reduced to levels comparable to that of 10-ride tickets formerly offered by GO Transit. The loyalty discount system is in place where passengers frequently travelling between two fare zones will receive further discounts after 30 (student) or 35 trips (adult) in a single month, so the fare paid per month never exceeds that of the corresponding GO Transit monthly pass. Fares for senior passengers do not receive a further discount beyond the same 50% of adult (ticket) prices offered via traditional fare media. See GO Transit fares for more information.
  - Passengers connecting to local transit from GO Transit will only be assessed the co-fare, if applicable, on the Presto card if the GO Transit trip was also assessed to the Presto card; the full local fare will be assessed otherwise. Passengers connecting to GO transit from local transit will have their co-fare discounts assessed when disembarking from their GO Transit trips.
- OC Transpo (Ottawa): Presto cards registered to addresses in Quebec may not use the Presto card when boarding OC Transpo buses, as per existing residency policies between OC Transpo and STO; STO fare media (including the STO Passe-Partout PLUS Card) must be used instead.
  - The "free fares for Seniors category on Wednesdays" is not enforced by Presto systems; a full fare will be assessed. Seniors riding OC Transpo buses on Wednesdays are encouraged to avoid tapping their Presto cards therein, unless intending to transfer to STO buses.
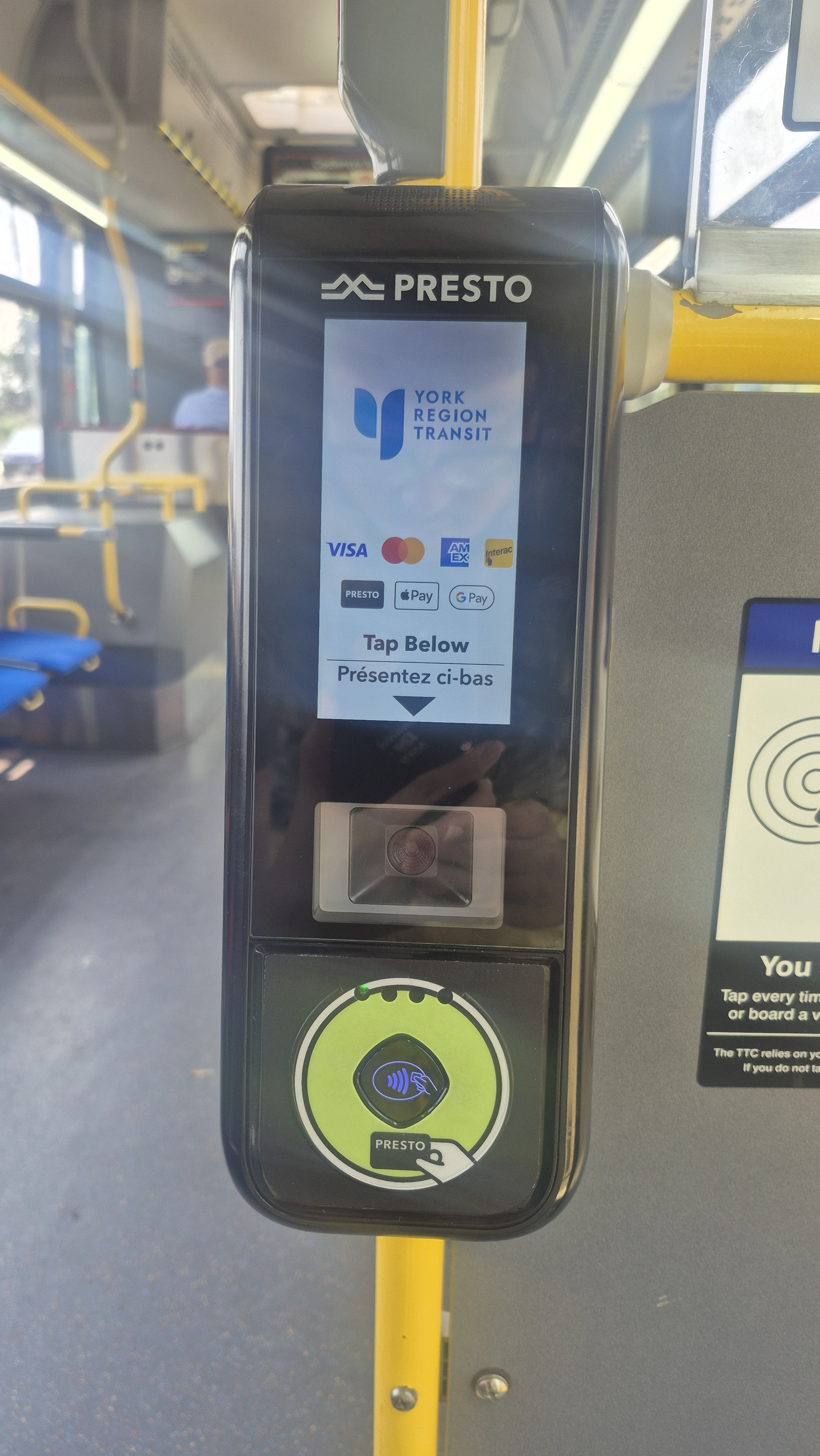
    A Presto reader in 2025 using the York Region Transit logo.
- Toronto Transit Commission: The TTC has implemented the Presto card machines at all subway stations, and on-board all TTC conventional buses and streetcars. As of 26 February 2024, customers paying by Presto, debit or credit card can receive either a free or discounted transfer between TTC, GO Transit and other participating local 905 transit agencies (Brampton Transit, Burlington Transit, Durham Regional Transit, Hamilton Street Railway, MiWay, Oakville Transit and York Regional Transit). However, this does not apply to the Union Pearson Express. Since 26 August 2018, there is also a 2-hour time-based transfer window available to Presto, credit or debit card holders who pay single fares using their stored card balance; with this transfer, customers are entitled to unlimited travel for two hours across the TTC network, from their first tap of the card, and have the ability to enter and exit any TTC vehicle (bus or streetcar) or subway station and/or switch directions without having to pay another fare. Unlike the other Greater Toronto transit agencies, the time-based transfer is currently not available for those who carry TTC paper transfers; these are good for a continuous one-way trip with no stopovers or backtracking permitted.
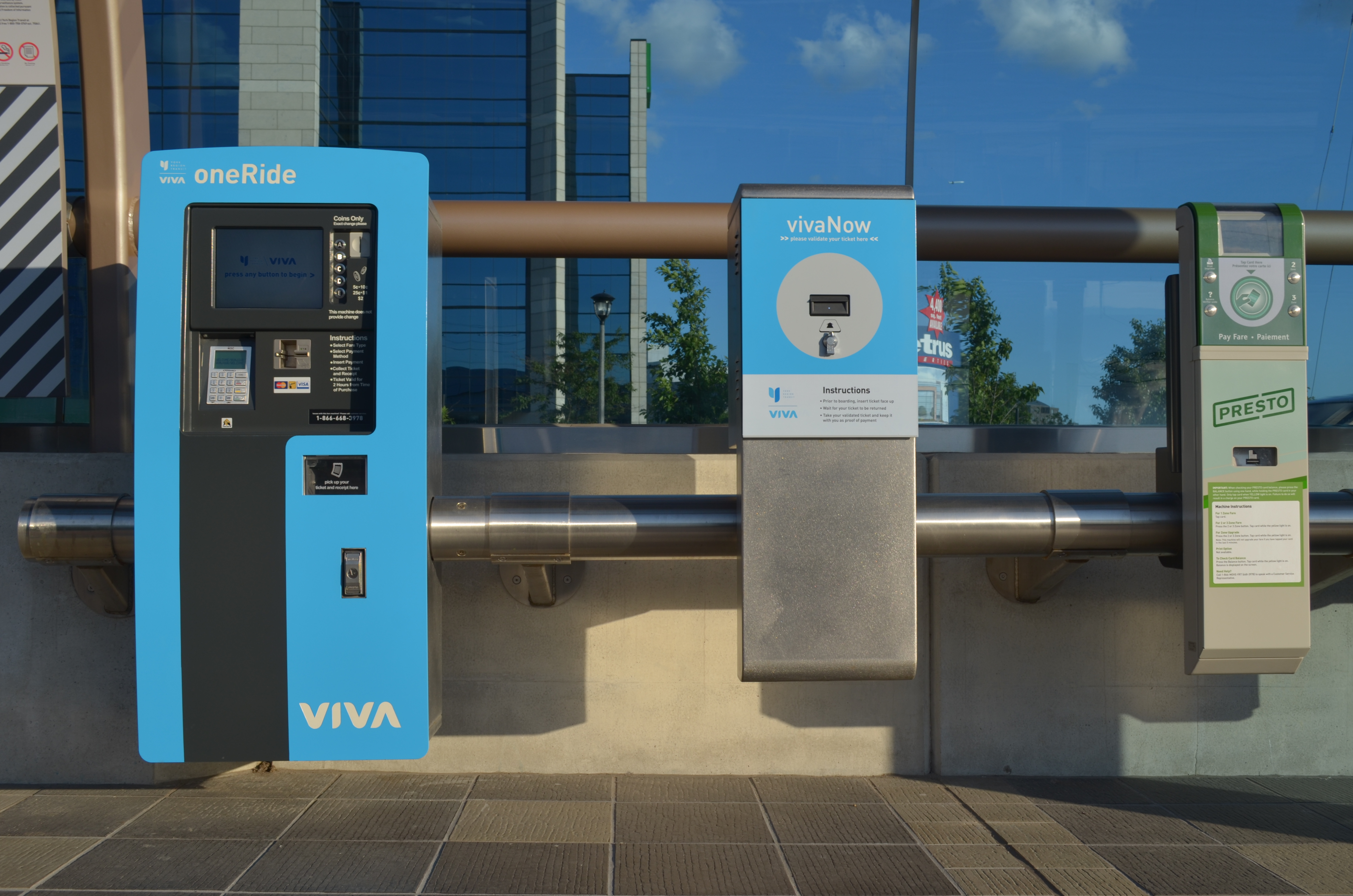
  Viva OneRide and Presto machines at a Vivastation
  - YRT fares are assessed when boarding 501 Züm Queen buses in York Region due to fare integration with YRT, and both YRT and Brampton Transit fare media are accepted for Züm buses in York Region. Passengers holding a Brampton Transit period pass will not be assessed a fare when boarding a Züm bus in York Region but will be assessed a fare for transferring to or from a YRT bus. In the case of Viva Orange, a YRT-operated Viva bus rapid transit (BRT) route, which is on a proof-of-payment (POP) system, while Züm buses (also BRT) are pay-as-you-board, it does not matter whether fares are deducted at the Vivastation vending machine or on board a Züm bus, except in the case of Brampton Transit period pass holders.
  - Effective 26 August 2019, the Presto card can be used to pay a YRT fare on TTC bus routes that travel in York Region (north of Steeles Avenue), but limited-use TTC Presto tickets are not accepted.

=== Inter-agency transfers ===
Local transit systems (except for OC Transpo) within the Presto card's service area honour transfers from neighbouring transit systems, and transferring between neighbouring transit systems continues to be honoured with the Presto Card where they were honoured with traditional fare media.

On most transit agencies, paper transfers are not required for Presto card users since the card itself acts as POP which can also be used to transfer from vehicle to vehicle or vehicle to station (and vice versa) and/or to show enforcement officers on designated POP routes on which they carry hand-held devices to verify that payment was made (tapped on upon entry to the station or vehicle) except in the following cases:

- "Companion fares" – using stored value in the Presto card e-purse to pay fares for two or more passengers; paper transfers will be issued for all passengers other than the cardholder.
- Depending on the transit operators involved, transferring from a local transit agency where the passenger has a local period pass to a neighbouring transit agency where the passenger does not (such as from Hamilton Street Railway to Burlington Transit while the Presto Card has a period pass for HSR); a full fare for the second transit agency will otherwise be assessed to the Presto Card.

As the Presto card is meant to replace paper transfers along with cash, tickets, tokens and paper passes, local transit operators have generally adopted the Presto card's transfer policies in their paper transfers (in the sense that, with the exception of OC Transpo), all local transit operators accept each other's transfers, and will not reissue transfers originally issued by other local transit operators), except for a generally longer transfer window provided by the Presto card.

=== Use with non-Presto agencies ===
- Barrie Transit: GO Transit users allowed to transfer to Barrie Transit buses for free by presenting their Presto cards at applicable connection points.
- Guelph Transit: Free transfers to and from GO Transit are offered for Presto card users or other GO media to and from Guelph Central GO Station.
- Grand River Transit: Free transfers to and from GO Transit are offered for Presto card users to and from Kitchener GO Station.
- Milton Transit: GO Transit users allowed to transfer to Milton Transit buses for free by presenting their Presto cards or other GO media at applicable connection points.
- Société de transport de l'Outaouais (STO): Presto card is compatible with STO Multi Card readers on STO buses. Passengers may use the Presto card to transfer to STO from OC Transpo; passengers with an OC Transpo monthly pass loaded on the Presto card may also board STO buses without having previously transferred from OC Transpo.
  - STO Multi Card readers are unable to deduct cash fares from Presto card holders. As such, the Presto cards may not be used to board an STO bus directly, nor provide companion fares.

Several businesses offer discounts to Presto card-holders.

== Presto ticket ==
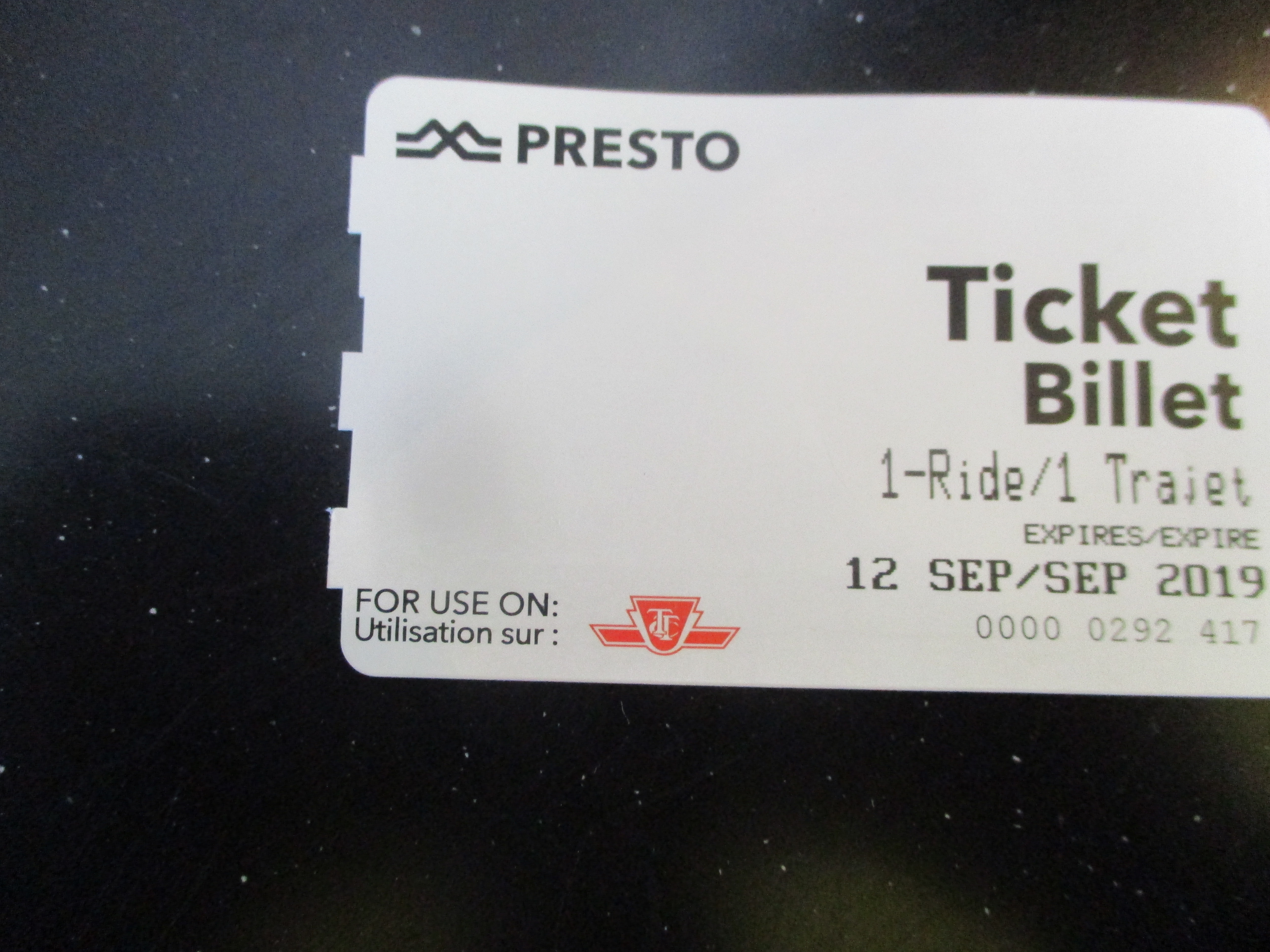
A limited-use, one-ride TTC Presto ticket

A Presto ticket is a single-use, paper ticket with an embedded electronic chip. Like the Presto card, users must tap the Presto ticket on a Presto reader when entering a TTC bus, streetcar or subway station. Unlike the Presto card, the Presto ticket is valid only for TTC services; it cannot be used for any other regional service providers or on TTC bus routes operating outside of the City of Toronto, such as those in York Region (north of Steeles Avenue) and Mississauga (west of Pearson Airport). The Presto ticket is intended for infrequent TTC customers.

There are 3 types of Presto ticket: 1-ride, 2-ride and day pass. Customers can purchase up to 10 Presto tickets at a time from Presto fare vending machines at all TTC subway stations. Unlike Presto cards, Presto tickets do not support concession fares for seniors, students, youth or children. As with Presto cards, there is a 2-hour transfer period for 1- and 2-ride Presto tickets for TTC services. The Presto day pass expires at 2:59 a.m. on the day following the ticket's first use.

A Presto ticket is not reloadable and is meant to be discarded once the travel period has ended. Because of the embedded chip, the ticket is not recyclable. Presto tickets bought by individuals must be used within 90 days of purchase, although service agencies may purchase Presto tickets that can be used up to one year from purchase. All Presto tickets have an expiry date so as not to overload the central computer system that tracks all unexpired Presto tickets. Presto fare vending machines at subway stations have an inquiry feature to check whether a purchased Presto ticket is still valid.

As of 8 July 2019, Presto tickets are available for purchase at all TTC subway stations.

== Contactless payment by credit or debit card ==
On most GTHA transit systems, customers also have the option to pay their adult single-ride fares by tapping a contactless credit card, debit card (such as Visa, Mastercard, American Express, or Interac) or a mobile device (mobile phone or watch) on a Presto fare reader when or prior to boarding a transit vehicle (and alighting for GO Transit or UP Express) in addition to being able to use the Presto card. UP Express was the first transit service provider with this system on board when it first launched on 11 March 2021.

As of 8 September 2024, open contactless credit and debit card payment options can be used on the following transit service providers:

- Brampton Transit
- Burlington Transit
- Durham Regional Transit
- GO Transit
- Hamilton Street Railway
- MiWay
- Oakville Transit
- OCTranspo (Ottawa)
- Toronto Transit Commission
- UP Express
- York Regional Transit

== See also ==
- List of smart cards
