= Thornlea station =

Railway station in Markham, Ontario

Thornlea

General information
- Coordinates: 43°49′32″N 79°24′09″W

Former services
Preceding station	Canadian National Railway	Following station
Oriole toward Toronto	Capreol – Toronto	Richmond Hill toward Capreol

Thornlea station was a station in Ontario, Canada served by CN commuter trains bound for Capreol/Parry Sound. The station was 16 miles north of Toronto Union. The station closed when CN's commuter services through the Bala Subdivision were discontinued.

GO Transit's Richmond Hill line operates services through the station's site but trains don't call at Thornlea station, instead calling at new stations in Old Cummer and Langstaff.
