= Sudbury Junction station =

Railway station in Greater Sudbury, Ontario, Canada

Sudbury Junction
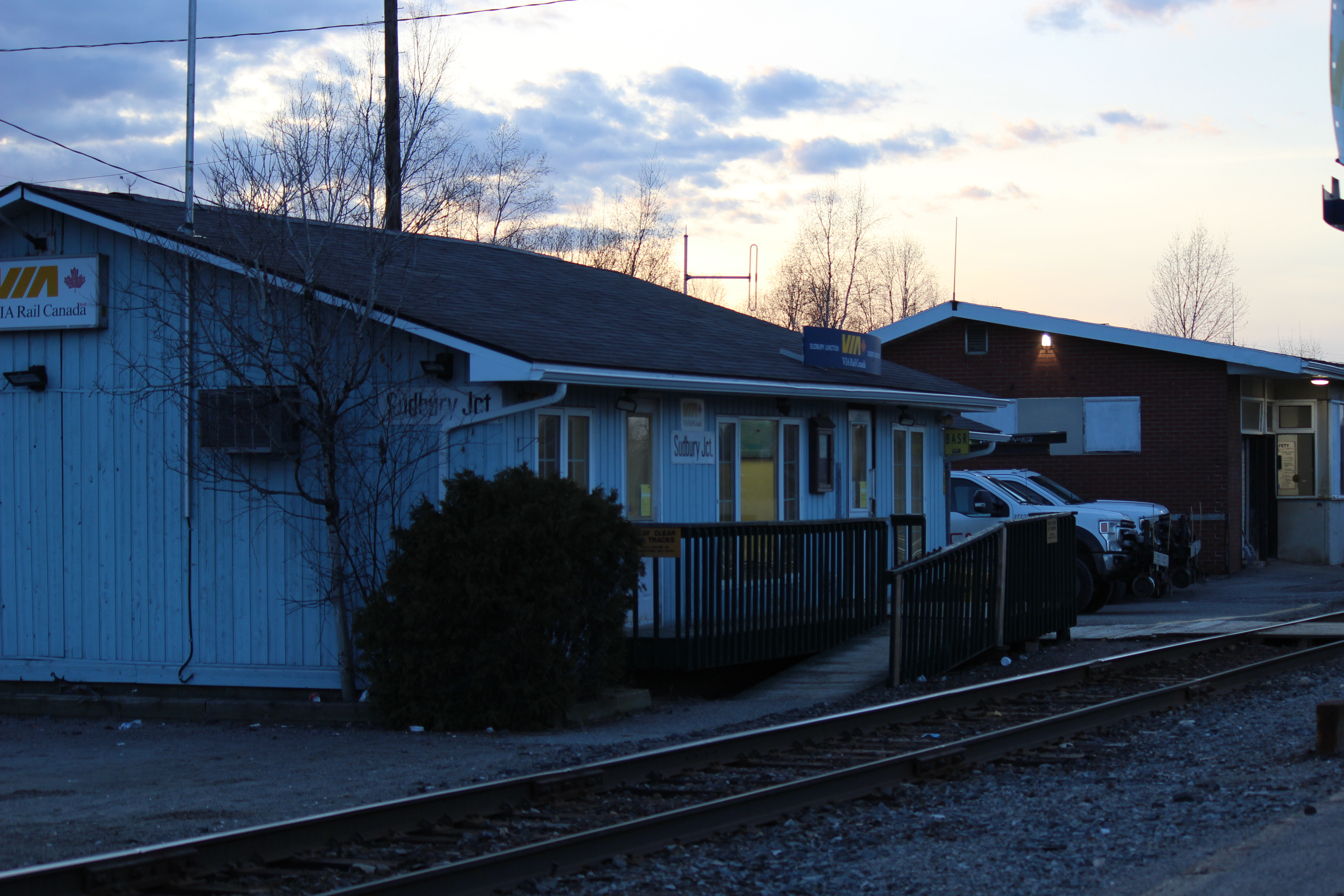

General information
- Location: 2750 LaSalle Boulevard East; Sudbury, Ontario; P3A 4R7
- Coordinates: 46°31′27″N 80°54′06″W
- Owner: Via Rail
- Platforms: 1
- Tracks: 1

Construction
- Parking: Free
- Accessible: yes

Other information
- Status: Staffed station
- IATA code: XDY
- Website: Sudbury Jct train station

History
- Former names: Canadian National Railway

Services
Preceding station	Via Rail	Following station
Capreol toward Vancouver	The Canadian	Parry Sound toward Toronto
Former services
Preceding station	Via Rail	Following station
Capreol toward Vancouver	Super Continental	Bolger toward Toronto
Preceding station	Canadian National Railway	Following station
Garlake toward Capreol	Capreol – Toronto	Coniston toward Toronto
Sudbury Terminus	Sudbury Branch	Terminus
Location
- Location within Ontario Location within Canada

Sudbury Junction station (IATA: XDY) is a train station in Greater Sudbury, Ontario, Canada, serving Via Rail. It serves The Canadian train. It is not connected to the Greater Sudbury Transit bus system or the original Sudbury station (eastern terminus of the Sudbury–White River train) 10 km (6.2 mi) downtown. On-site ticket sales are not available.

The station consists of a siding clad single-storey building with a small waiting area.

== Location ==
Sudbury Junction station is located at 2750 LaSalle Boulevard East in a largely undeveloped industrial area on the northeast fringe of Sudbury. Its main entrance faces northeast towards the railroad tracks, where trains call at a low level platform adjacent to the CN Bala Subdivision.

== See also ==
- Sudbury station (Ontario)
- Capreol station
- Sudbury Ontario Northland Bus Terminal
- Sudbury Airport - (IATA: YSB, ICAO: CYSB)
