= Oriole GO Station =

Railway station in Toronto, Ontario, Canada

Oriole
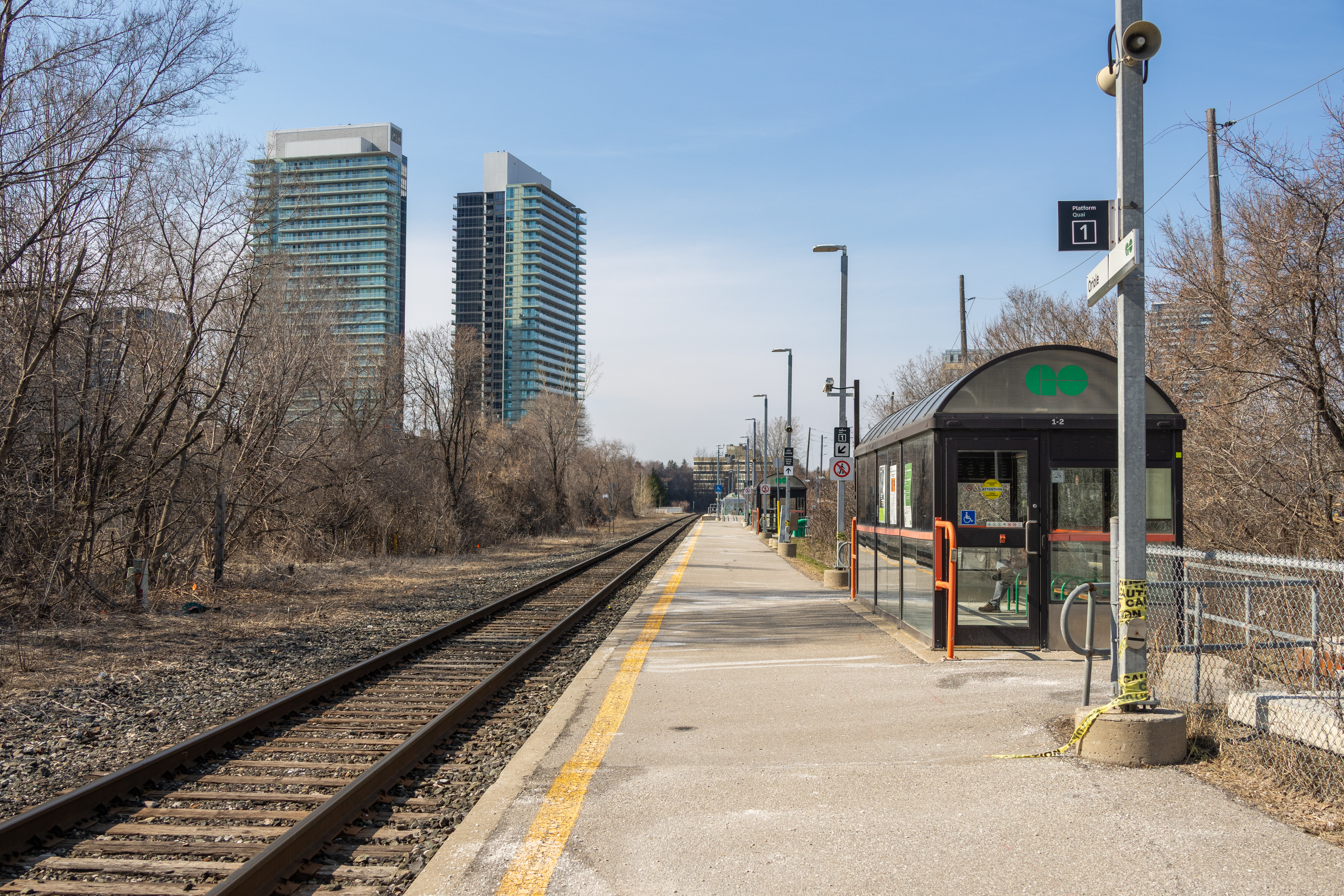
- Station platform in 2026

General information
- Location: 3300 Leslie Street; Toronto, Ontario; Canada
- Coordinates: 43°45′56″N 79°21′53″W
- Owner: Metrolinx
- Platforms: 1 side platform
- Tracks: 1
- Connections: at Leslie

Construction
- Structure type: Station building with public washroom and waiting room
- Parking: 286 spaces
- Cycle facilities: Racks
- Accessible: No

Other information
- Station code: GO Transit: OR
- Fare zone: 05

History
- Opened: April 29, 1978

Services
Preceding station	GO Transit	Following station
Union Terminus	Richmond Hill	Old Cummer towards Bloomington
Former services at CN station
Preceding station	Canadian National Railway	Following station
Leaside toward Toronto	Capreol – Toronto	Thornlea toward Capreol
Location

Oriole GO Station is a small train station on GO Transit's Richmond Hill line. It is located under the Highway 401 overpass, west of Leslie Street in the North York district of Toronto, Ontario, Canada. It is approximately 500 metres (1,600 ft) south of Leslie subway station on Line 4 Sheppard of the Toronto Transit Commission.

A pedestrian walkway along the east side of tracks connects the north end of the platform to Esther Shiner Boulevard and a short walk along Old Leslie Street leads to the upper, automated entrance to the subway station. It has been proposed several times that the GO station should be moved to allow for a direct connection with the subway.

There is a footbridge over the track, allowing pedestrians to walk between the station to Woodsworth Road. This bridge replaced an old, narrower bridge further north. This 30-metre (98 ft) metre bridge is enclosed in a mesh safety screen and has an anti-slip floor.

Nearby points of interest include the Concord Park Place condominium complex, IKEA North York, and North York General Hospital.

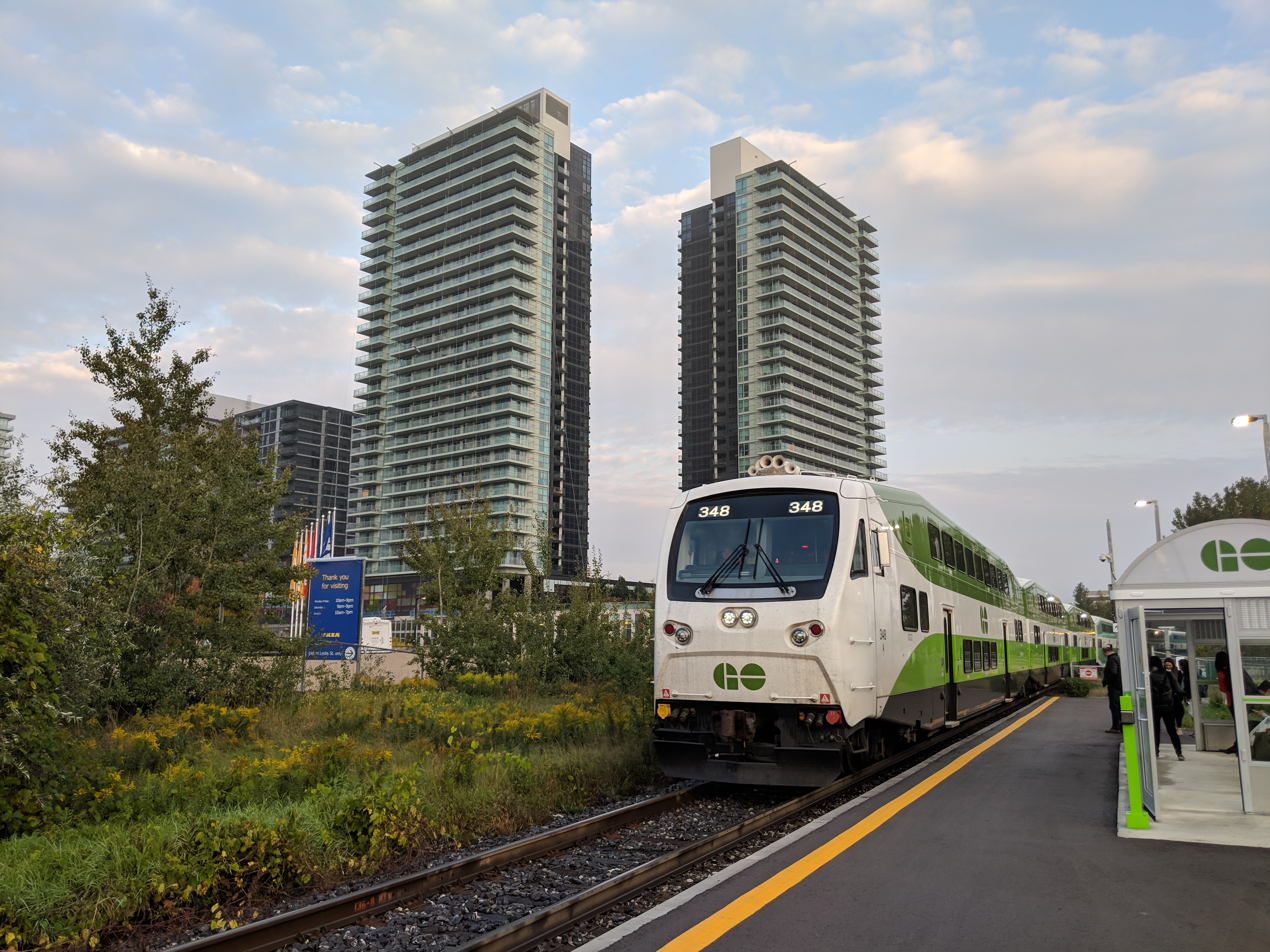
Track level at Oriole GO Station, looking north with Concord Park Place in the background.

== Connecting transit ==
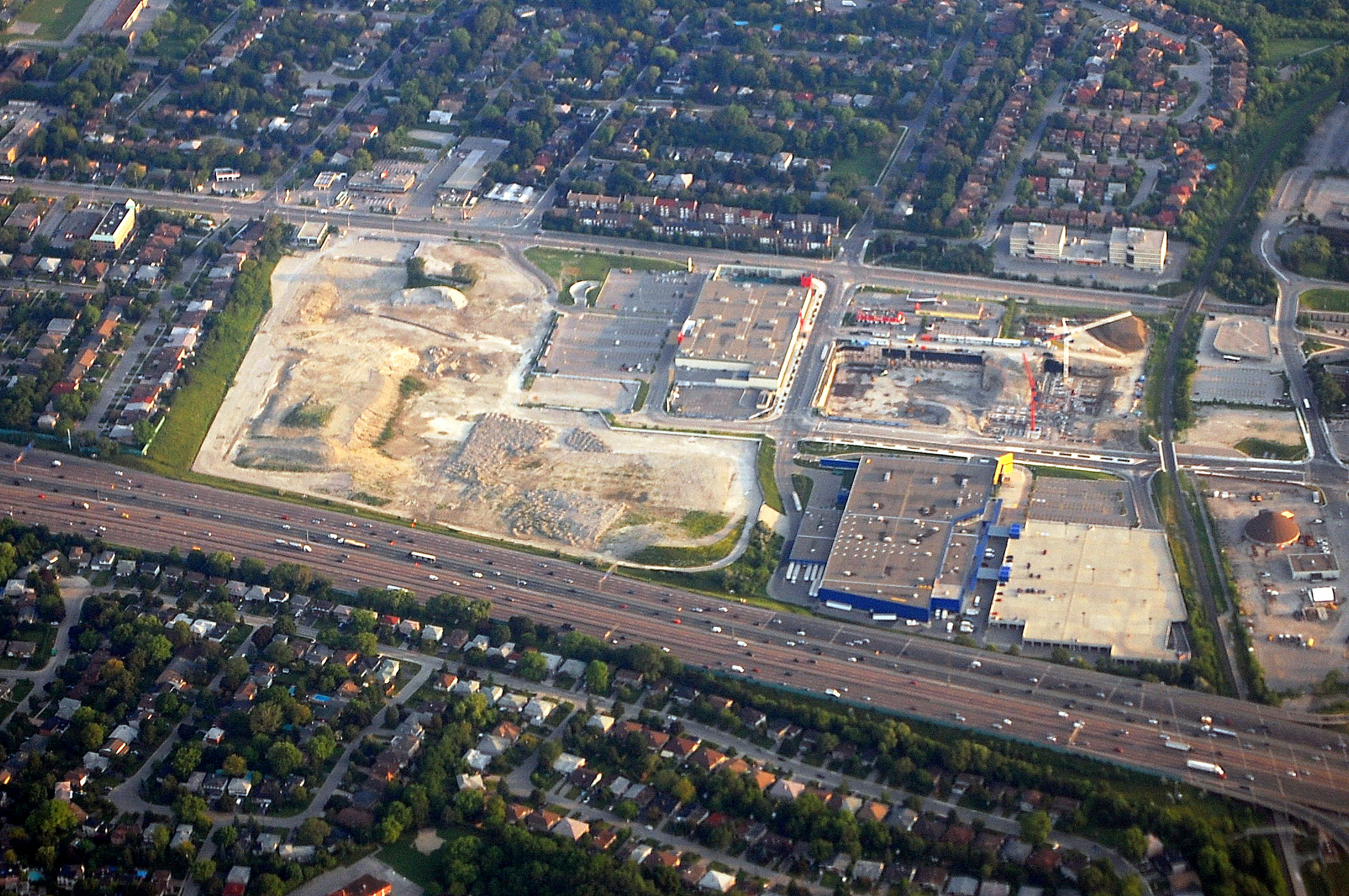
Oriole GO Station in the bottom right corner, where it is crossed by Highway 401

Toronto Transit Commission services in the vicinity of Oriole GO Station include:

- Line 4 Sheppard subway trains at Leslie station
- 51 Leslie bus at Leslie station
- 185 Sheppard Central bus along Sheppard Avenue
- 115 Silver Hills on Woodsworth Road, west of the station
- 151 Leslie North bus at Leslie station

== CNR Oriole station ==
There were two prior stations at Oriole. In 1906, the Canadian Northern Railway built the first station on the south side of York Mills west of Don Mills Road, but named it Duncan Station since it was located on property previously owned by William Duncan III. When the Canadian National Railways took over the Canadian Northern in 1923, it closed Duncan Station moving its building away from the tracks, and replacing it by a flag stop on the north side of York Mills Road. The station name was changed to Oriole. The original station building was demolished in 1987. The second station was closed and demolished in 1978.

South of Oriole Station and York Mills Road, there used to be a junction to the Oriole Spur (a.k.a. Leaside Spur), a branch line built in 1916 that connected to the Canadian Northern's maintenance facilities in Leaside serving industries along the way. Today, the Oriole Spur has been converted into the Don Mills Trail, a walking and cycling path.

== Layover facility ==
Metrolinx is planning to construct a layover facility for GO trains along the Richmond Hill GO Line south of Oriole GO Station near York Mills Road. Trains would be stored at the facility between the morning and afternoon peak periods, and would access the facility by shuttling from and to Union Station.

Until this facility is ready, GO Transit will use Rosedale Siding, located in the Don Valley between Bayview Avenue and the Don River, as a temporary stage facility. Originally, the new facility was to be in the Don Valley under the Prince Edward Viaduct. However, this location drew much criticism from local politicians, residents and conservationists. By March 2023, Metrolinx had abandoned plans to use this location.
