= Richmond Hill GO Station =

Railway station in Richmond Hill, Ontario, Canada

Richmond Hill
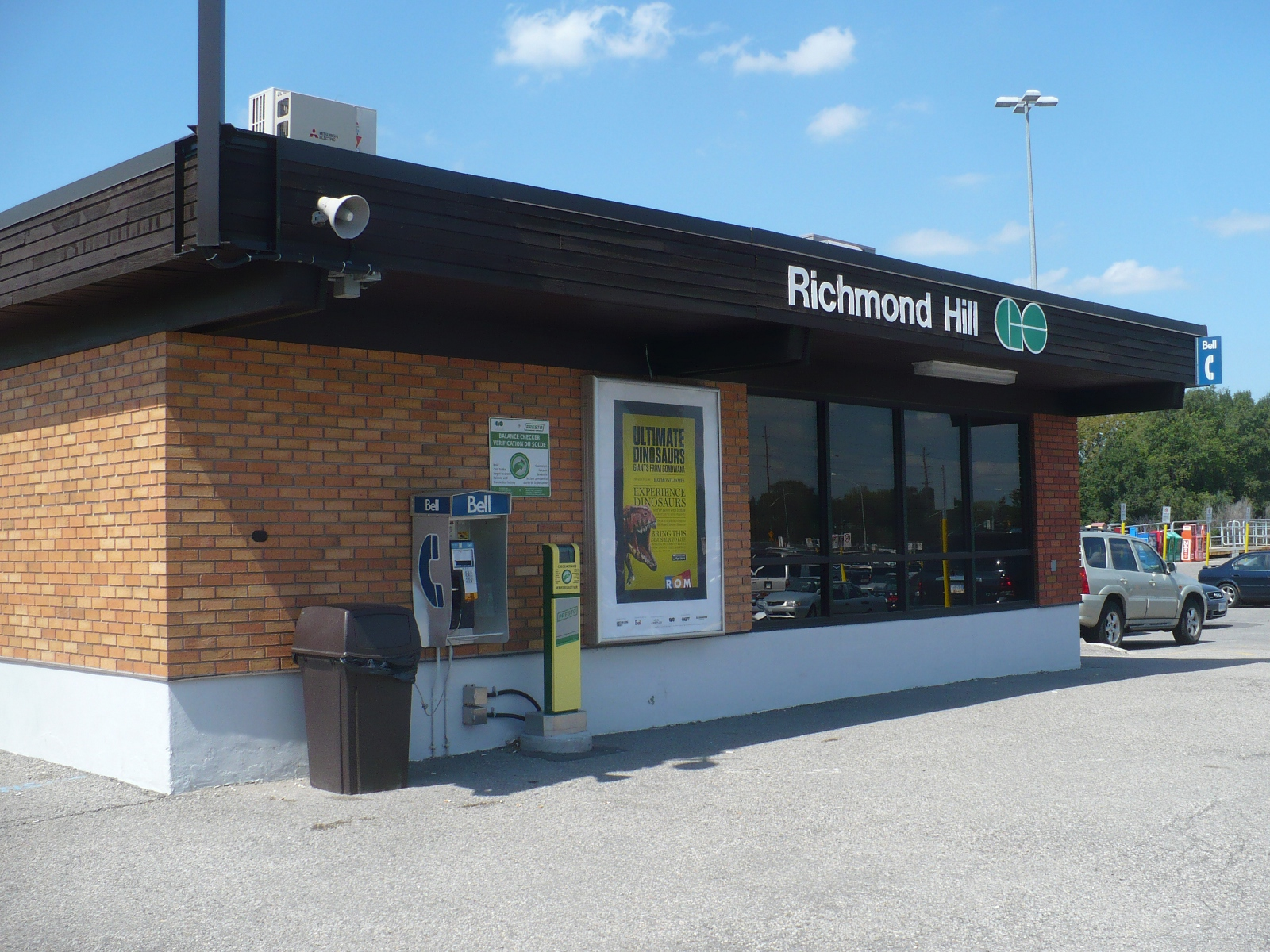

General information
- Location: 6 Newkirk Road; Richmond Hill, Ontario; Canada
- Coordinates: 43°52′29″N 79°25′35.4″W
- Owner: Metrolinx
- Platforms: 1 side platform
- Tracks: 3
- Bus routes: 61
- Connections: York Region Transit

Construction
- Structure type: Station building with public washroom and waiting room
- Parking: 1,229 spaces
- Cycle facilities: yes
- Accessible: yes

Other information
- Station code: GO Transit: RI
- Fare zone: 50

History
- Opened: April 29, 1978

Services
Preceding station	GO Transit	Following station
Langstaff towards Union	Richmond Hill	Gormley towards Bloomington
Former services at CN station
Preceding station	Canadian National Railway	Following station
Thornlea toward Toronto	Capreol – Toronto	Gormley toward Capreol
Location

Richmond Hill GO Station is a train and bus station in the GO Transit network located in Richmond Hill, Ontario, Canada. It was the northern terminus of the Richmond Hill line train service from the service's inception in 1982 until the opening of Gormley GO Station on December 5, 2016.

Of all the Richmond Hill line stations, this is the only station that has a reduced length platform which accommodates only up to an L8 consist, a trainset consisting of eight Bombardier BiLevel Coaches and at least one locomotive. Beginning in the spring of 2015, the platform was scheduled to be extended to allow 12-car trains. A pedestrian bridge over Major Mackenzie Drive was built, and a new station building was planned but has not been built. The train layover facility in Richmond Hill was opened in 2014.

== History ==
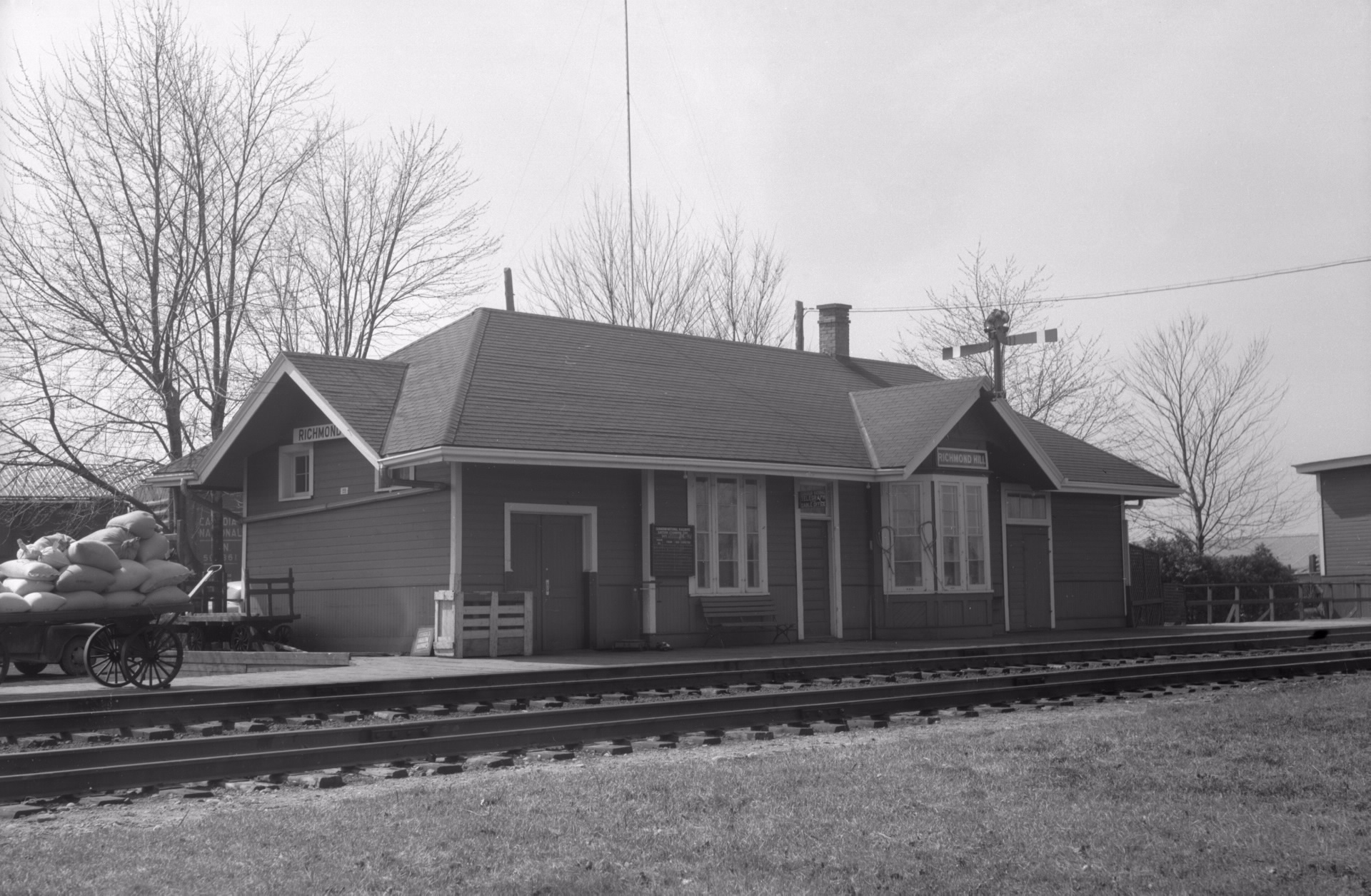
Original station in 1911

The original Richmond Hill railway station was a single storey clapboard building, located on the north side of Centre Street East, just a short distance north of the current station. Built in 1906 by the James Bay Railway, the station was closed by Canadian National Railway in 1968 and the building was relocated in 1979 to Richmond Green, at Elgin Mills Road and Leslie Street, to serve as a clubhouse for local minor soccer teams.

== Connecting buses ==
York Region Transit:

- 4 Major Mackenzie (West)
- 25 Major Mackenzie (East)
- 86 Newkirk-Red Maple

GO Transit:

- 61 Bloomington GO Station to Union Station Bus Terminal
