= GTTA =

GTTA is an abbreviation for the former legal names of the following transportation agencies in the Greater Toronto Area of Ontario, Canada:

- Greater Toronto Transportation Authority - the former legal name of Metrolinx, the Ontario provincial agency responsible for transportation planning in the Greater Toronto Area and Hamilton
- Greater Toronto Transit Authority - the former legal name of GO Transit, now a branch of Metrolinx.
