= Old Cummer GO Station =

Railway station in Toronto, Ontario, Canada

Old Cummer
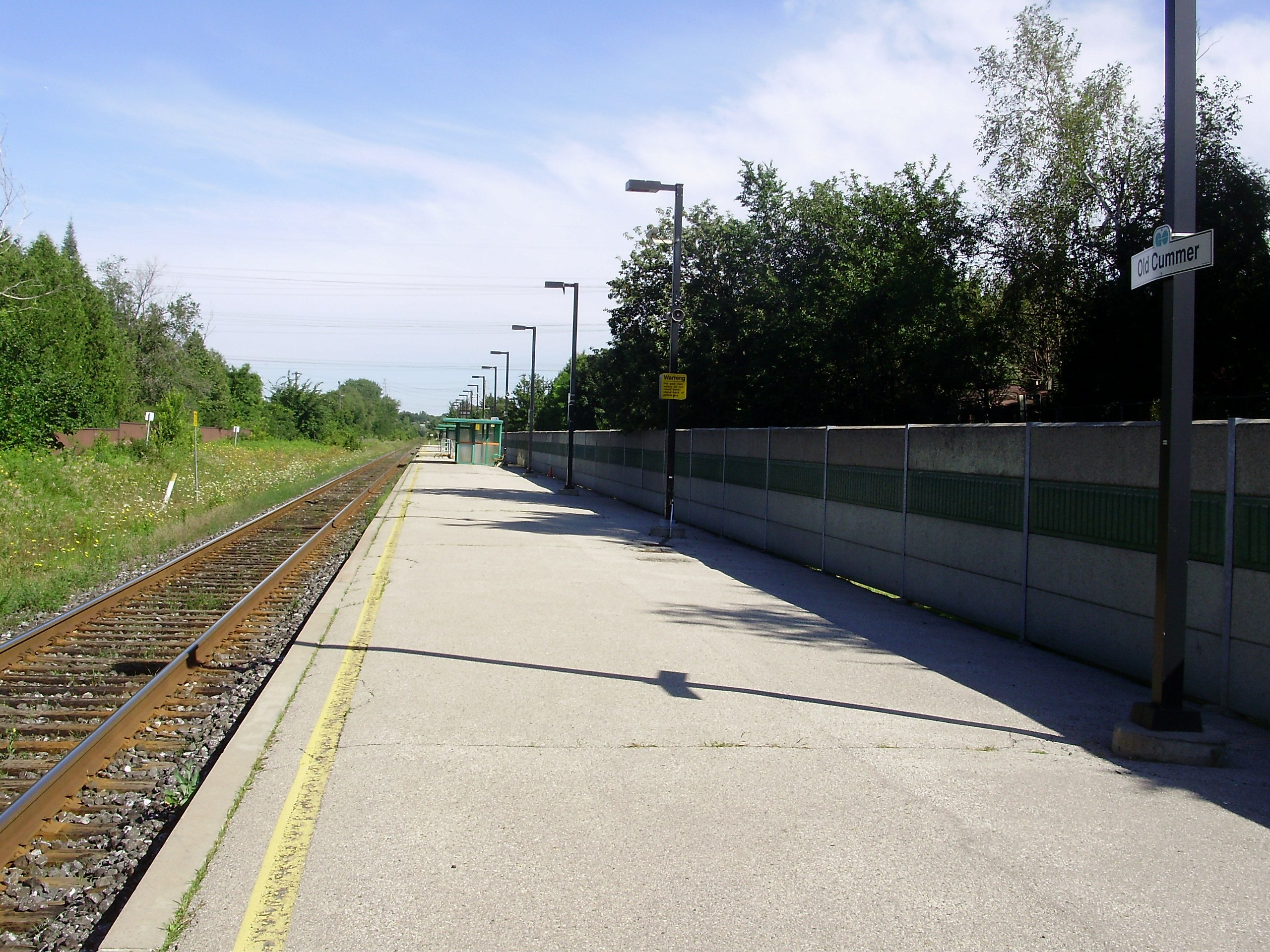

General information
- Location: 5760 Leslie Street; Toronto, Ontario
- Coordinates: 43°47′37″N 79°22′17″W
- Owner: Metrolinx
- Platforms: 1 side platform
- Tracks: 1

Construction
- Structure type: Station building with public washroom and waiting room
- Parking: 439
- Cycle facilities: Yes
- Accessible: yes

Other information
- Station code: GO Transit: OL
- Fare zone: 05

History
- Opened: April 29, 1978
- Rebuilt: 2004

Services
| Preceding station | GO Transit | Following station |
|---|---|---|
| Oriole towards Union | Richmond Hill | Langstaff towards Bloomington |
Location

Old Cummer GO Station is a train and bus station in the GO Transit network located in the North York district of Toronto, Ontario, Canada. It is a stop on the Richmond Hill line train service and offers service to Union Station in downtown Toronto.

In September 2004 construction began on a rehabilitated station building, providing improved lighting and providing accessible features into the station building.

As of June 2023, the station building is currently not staffed at any time and is closed to the public, but small pedestrian shelters are available.

The current GO schedule only has trains stopping during certain periods. Monday to Friday, southbound trains are only available between 6:32 and 8:32, arriving every hour. Northbound trains are only available 16:18 and 19:18, again arriving every hour.

== Connecting transit ==
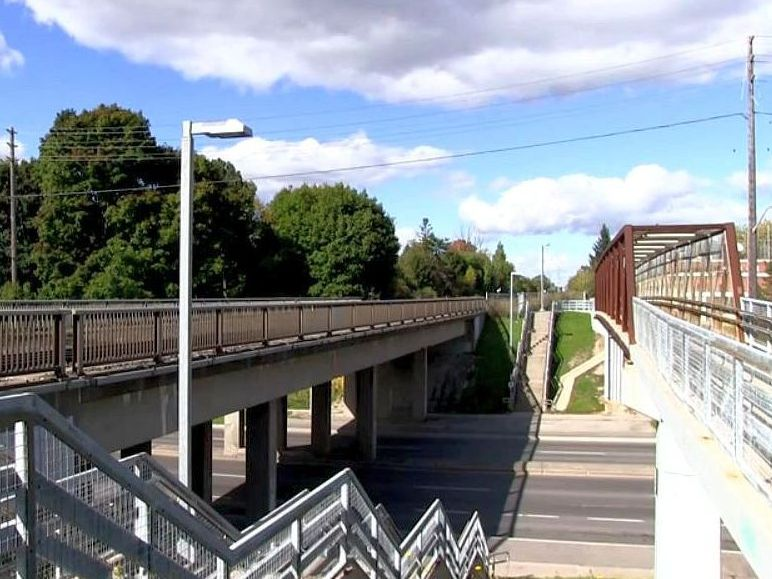
Finch Avenue bridges and the set of stairs to enter the railway station

Local transit services are provided by the Toronto Transit Commission with buses along Leslie Street and frequent services along Finch Avenue (3-4 min frequency during peak). Express service is only available on the westbound bus stop. Stairs and a footbridge across Finch Avenue provide walk-in access to the south bus stop and sidewalk.

The Canadian, VIA Rail's train between Vancouver and Toronto Union Station, passes through Old Cummer station but does not stop.
