= Richmond Hill line =

Commuter rail service in Ontario, Canada

Richmond Hill
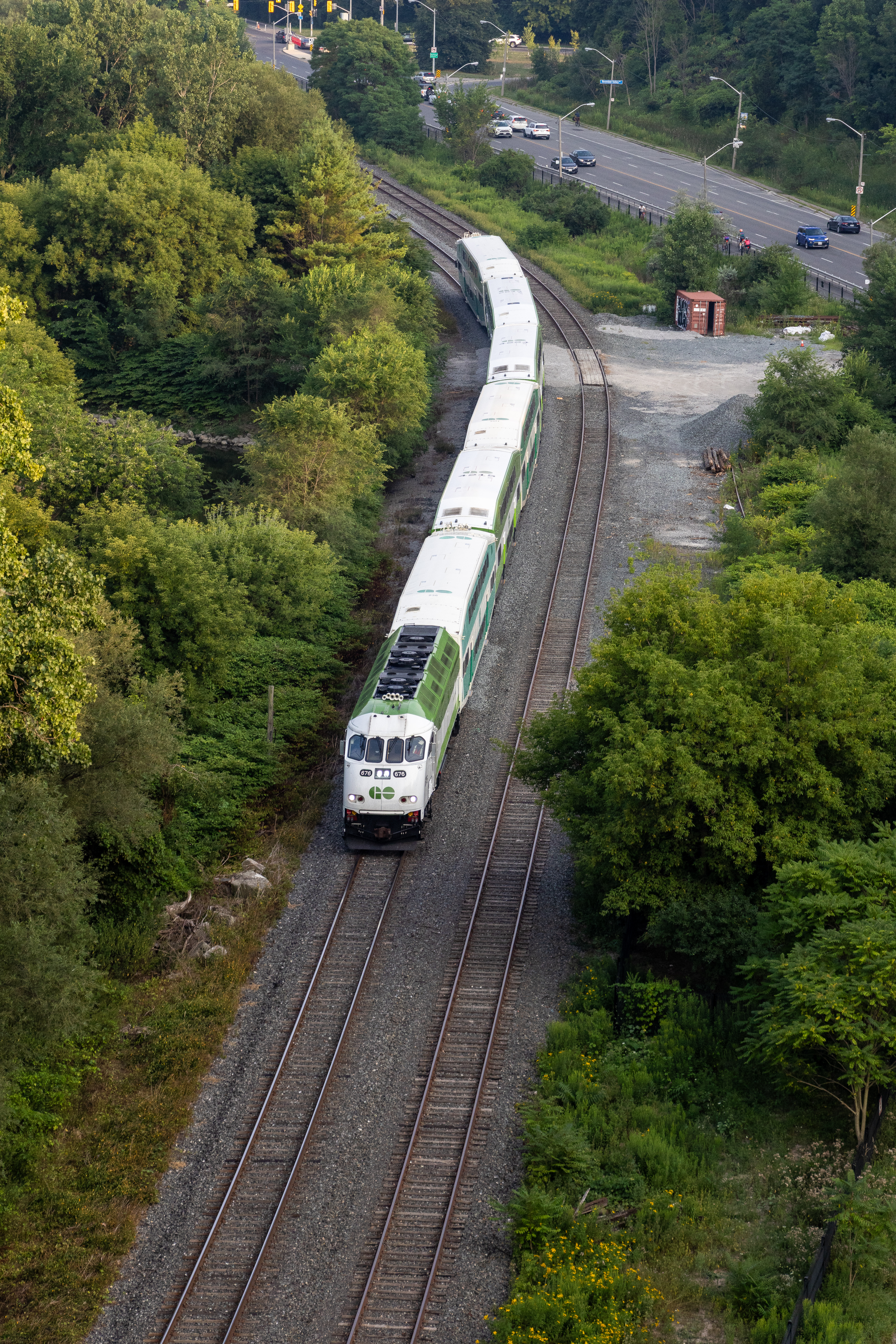
- A GO train on the Richmond Hill line

Overview
- Service type: Commuter rail
- System: GO Transit rail services
- Locale: Greater Toronto Area
- First service: May 1, 1978; 48 years ago
- Current operator: Alstom
- Daily ridership: 5,800 (2019)

Route
- Termini: Union; Bloomington
- Stops: 7
- Distance travelled: 45.9 km (28.5 mi)

Technical
- Track gauge: 1,435 mm (4 ft 8 1/2 in) standard gauge
- Operating speed: 65 mph (105 km/h)
- Average length: 6–10 coaches
- Track owners: Metrolinx; Canadian National Railway

The Richmond Hill line is one of the seven train lines of the GO Transit system in the Greater Toronto Area, Ontario, Canada. It operates between Union Station in Toronto to Bloomington GO Station in the north in Richmond Hill. Trains on the line operate only during weekday peak hours (morning trains southbound, afternoon trains northbound), while off-peak weekday times are served by the GO bus route 61.

== History ==
A Richmond Hill commuter train service had been announced in 1969 by the provincial government, but its implementation was cancelled in 1970 in favour of a bus commuter service.

Following a promotional opening on Saturday April 29, the Richmond Hill line became the fourth GO Transit rail line on Monday, May 1, 1978. The opening had been delayed because the BiLevel coaches ordered for the Lakeshore line were not delivered on time, so existing Lakeshore line trains were not available to be redeployed on the Richmond Hill line.

The layout of the line remained generally unchanged until the 2010s, when the line was extended as part of the GO 2020 strategy, which aimed to extend the line north to Aurora Road in Whitchurch-Stouffville. The line was first extended north to Gormley in late 2016, with a new train layover facility at Bethesda Road. It was extended further north to Bloomington Road in June 2021.

== Route ==
The Richmond Hill line operates over the CN Bala Subdivision, which is owned by Metrolinx between Union Station and Doncaster Diamond, where the line crosses the CN York Subdivision. North of Doncaster Diamond, the line is owned by Canadian National and is part of its transcontinental freight route.

The Via Rail transcontinental service "The Canadian" from Vancouver to Toronto operates along the entire route of the Richmond Hill line, but does not stop at any stations other than Union.

During regular service, the Richmond Hill line operates trains that are six to ten coaches long. During the COVID-19 pandemic, GO Transit reduced the number of coaches on all Richmond Hill line trains from six to four cars due to diminished ridership.

== Stations ==
Station	Community	Municipality	Regional Mun.	Fare zone	Distance (km)	Connections
Bloomington	Oak Ridges	Richmond Hill	York	98	45.9	GO Transit GO Transit bus services
Gormley	Gormley	Richmond Hill	York	78	42.3	GO Transit GO Transit bus services York Region Transit
Richmond Hill	Richmond Hill	Richmond Hill	York	50	33.8	GO Transit GO Transit bus services York Region Transit
Langstaff	Langstaff	Richmond Hill	York	60	29.5	(via Richmond Hill Centre)
Old Cummer	North York	Toronto		05	22.7	TTC
Oriole	North York	Toronto		05	19.6	(via Leslie station); TTC
Union	Toronto	Toronto		02	0.0	TTC

== Future ==
As a part of GO Expansion, train service along the Richmond Hill line is planned to be expanded over the next decade. During peak hours, trains would run in peak direction every 15–30 minutes along this line. To implement the planned RER service, the Richmond Hill line would need $1 billion in flood mitigation and a grade separation at the Doncaster junction with the York Subdivision.

A layover facility was planned in the Don Valley adjacent to the Don Valley Parkway underneath the Prince Edward Viaduct as part of the GO Expansion program. In March 2023, Metrolinx found a different site for the planned facility in a light industrial zone at York Mills Road east of Leslie Street. GO Transit will use the Rosedale Siding adjacent to Bayview Avenue along the route as a temporary layover facility.

== See also ==
- Toronto Transit Commission
- York Region Transit
- Canadian National Railways
