= Langstaff GO Station =

Railway station in Richmond Hill, Ontario, Canada

Langstaff
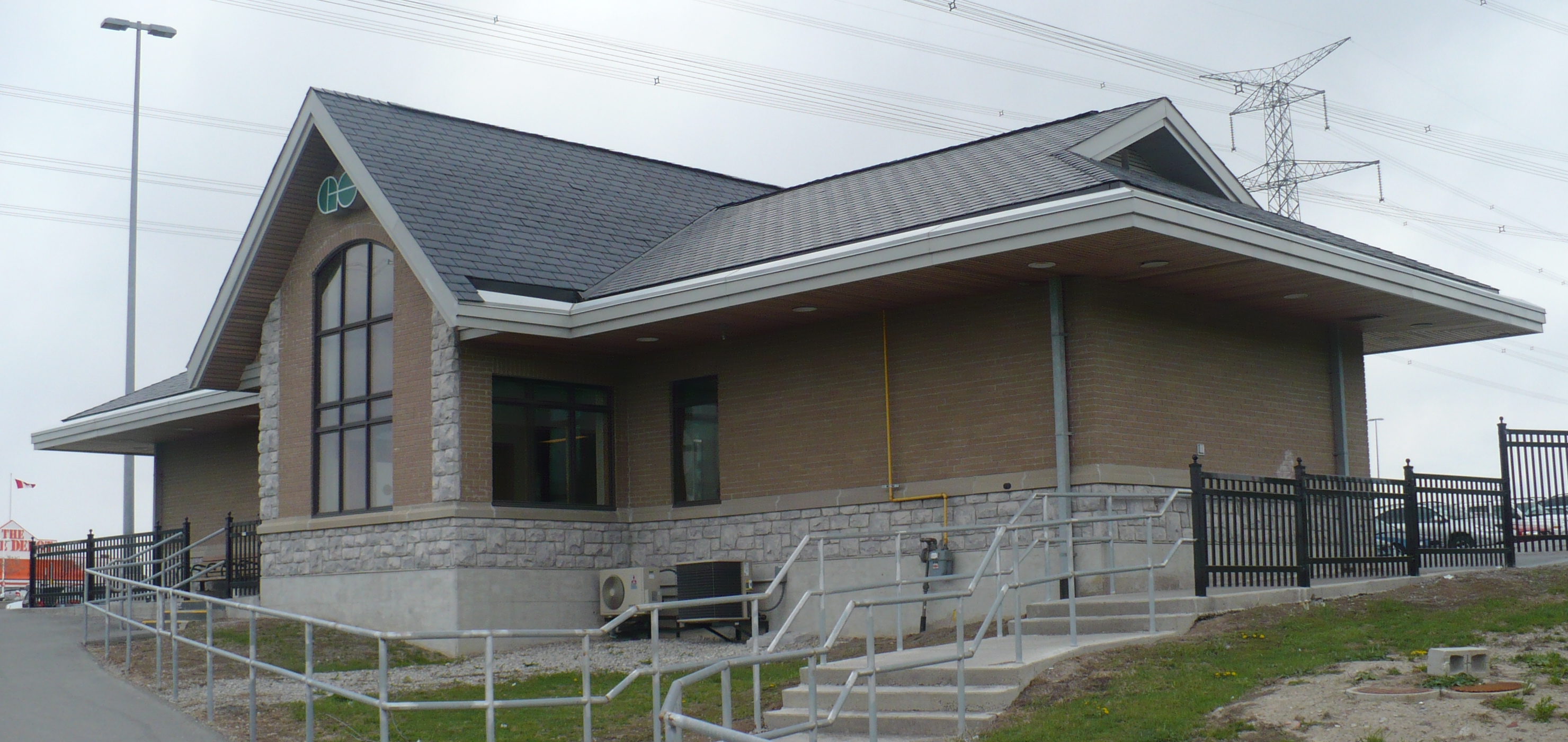
- Langstaff station north building in June 2008

General information
- Location: 10 Red Maple Road; Richmond Hill, Ontario; Canada
- Coordinates: 43°50′15″N 79°25′21″W
- Owner: Metrolinx
- Platforms: 1 side platform
- Tracks: 2
- Bus routes: 61
- Connections: at Richmond Hill Centre

Construction
- Parking: 1,041 spaces
- Accessible: Yes

Other information
- Station code: GO Transit: LA
- Fare zone: 60

History
- Opened: April 29, 1978; 48 years ago
- Rebuilt: 2005

Services
Preceding station	GO Transit	Following station
Old Cummer towards Union	Richmond Hill	Richmond Hill towards Bloomington
Preceding station	Ontario Northland Railway	Following station
Gormley toward Cochrane	Northlander (reopening Dec. 10, 2026)	Toronto Terminus
Location

Langstaff station is a train and bus station in the GO Transit network located in Richmond Hill, Ontario in Canada. It is a stop on the Richmond Hill line train service and is a planned station on the Ontario Northlander.

In May 2005, construction of a new and more modern station building was completed, replacing the previous station building at Langstaff Road and using the north end of the same train platform. The south building was converted to a waiting room after the new station building opened for service on June 6, 2005. The new building has a ticket office for passengers to purchase bus and train tickets on weekday mornings.

Langstaff Road East was the original routing of Highway 7 between Yonge Street and Bayview Avenue. When Highway 7 was upgraded, an overpass was constructed over the Canadian National Railway tracks, and the area north of Langstaff road became a large commuter parking lot. With the construction of Highway 407, the south lot was reduced in size, but newer developments north of the former Highway 7 led to the building of the new terminal. The south parking lot has a kiss and ride loop.

The future extension of Line 1 of the Toronto subway will serve Langstaff GO station and the adjacent Richmond Hill Centre Terminal at Bridge station, with the extension expected to open in 2031.

Service on the Northlander is expected to resume on December 10, 2026.

== Bus connections ==
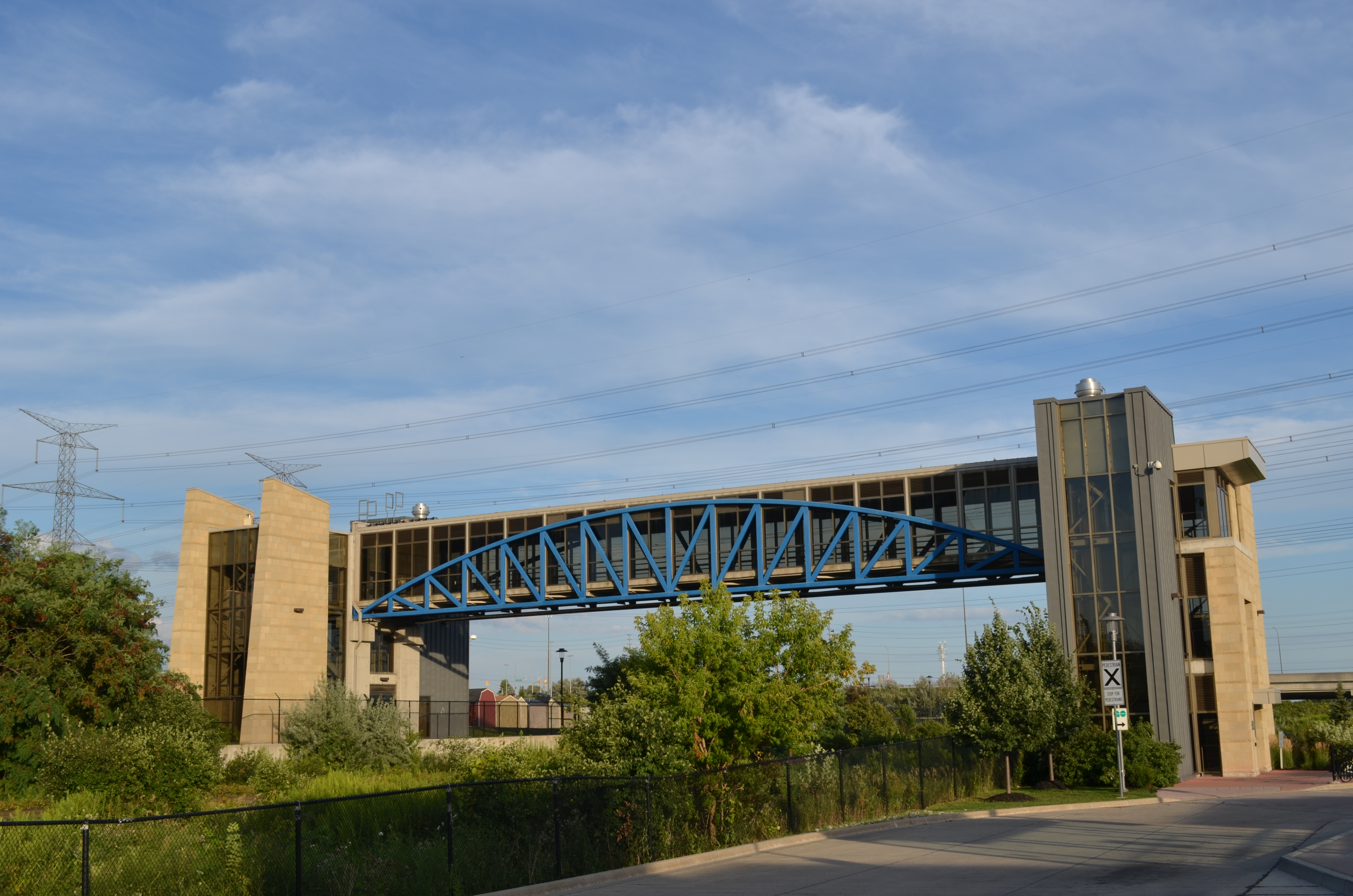
Pedestrian bridge to the Richmond Hill Centre Terminal

The station is served by GO Transit route 61 which travels between Bloomington GO Station and Union Station. This bus route provides service during off-peak times.

All other bus connections are made at Richmond Hill Centre Terminal immediately west of Langstaff station. A pedestrian bridge was opened in March 2008 to connect Richmond Hill Centre Terminal and the GO train station. In 2011, GO Transit moved all Highway 407 East bus services from Langstaff GO Station to Richmond Hill Centre Terminal.
