= Capreol station =

Railway station in Greater Sudbury, Ontario, Canada

Capreol
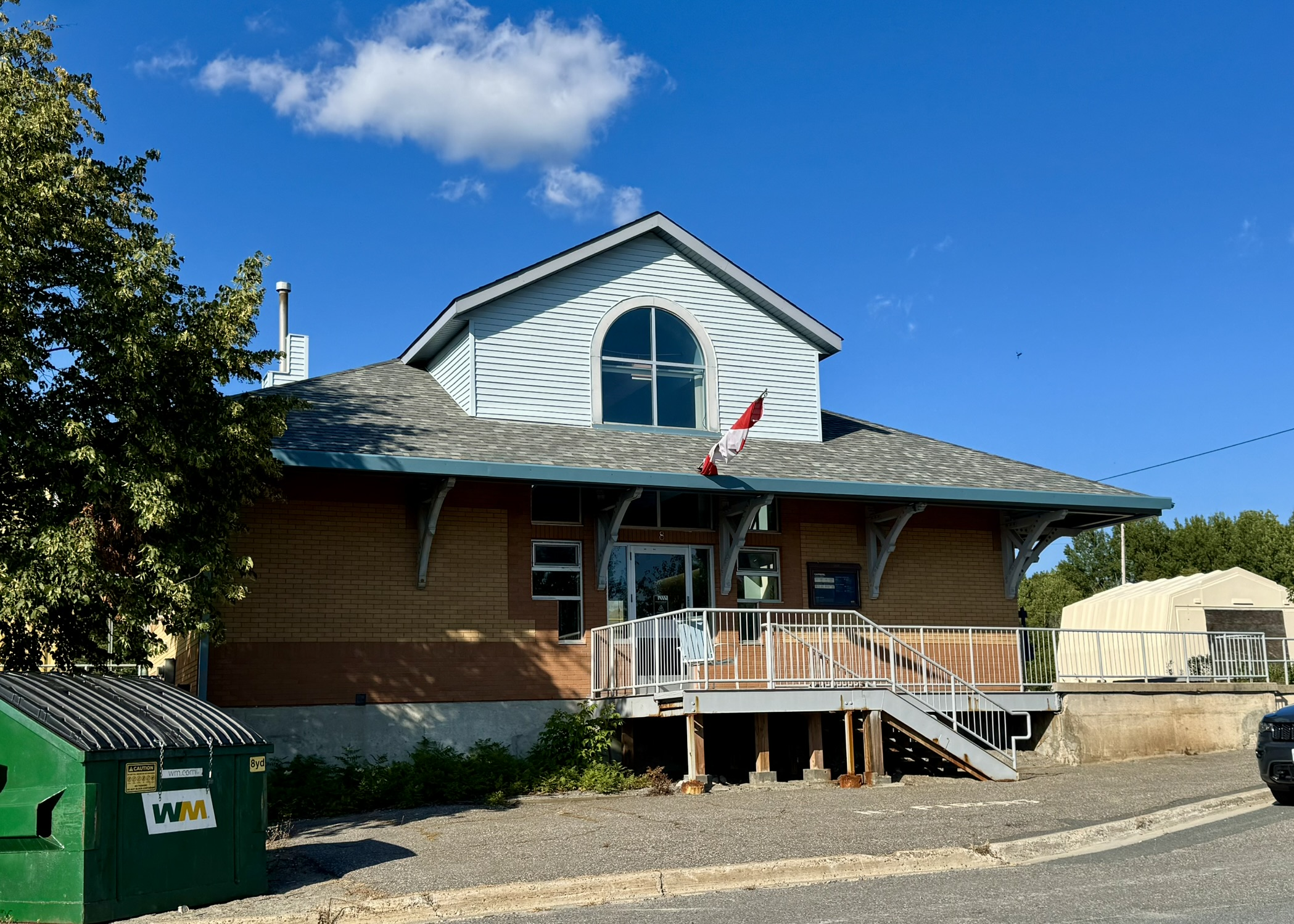

General information
- Location: 8 Front Street; Capreol, Ontario; P0M 1H0; Canada
- Coordinates: 46°42′40″N 80°55′44″W
- Owner: Via Rail
- Connections: GOVA

Construction
- Accessible: Yes

Other information
- Status: Staffed station

History
- Opened: 1915

Services
Preceding station	Via Rail	Following station
Laforest toward Vancouver	The Canadian	Sudbury Junction toward Toronto
Former services
Preceding station	Canadian National Railway	Following station
Milnet toward Vancouver	Main Line	Hagarty toward Montreal
Terminus	Capreol – Toronto	Hanmer toward Toronto
Location

Capreol railway station, located in the community of Capreol, Greater Sudbury, Ontario, Canada, is a stop for Via Rail's transcontinental The Canadian passenger rail service. The station building was constructed in 1915 by the Canadian Northern Railway (CNoR) at a divisional point on the Canadian Northern system. It became part of the Canadian National (CN Rail) railway system when Canadian Northern was amalgamated with other railways to form CN. After the creation of Via Rail, ownership and management of the station, along with passenger services, were transferred to Via Rail, while freight operations continued with CN Rail.

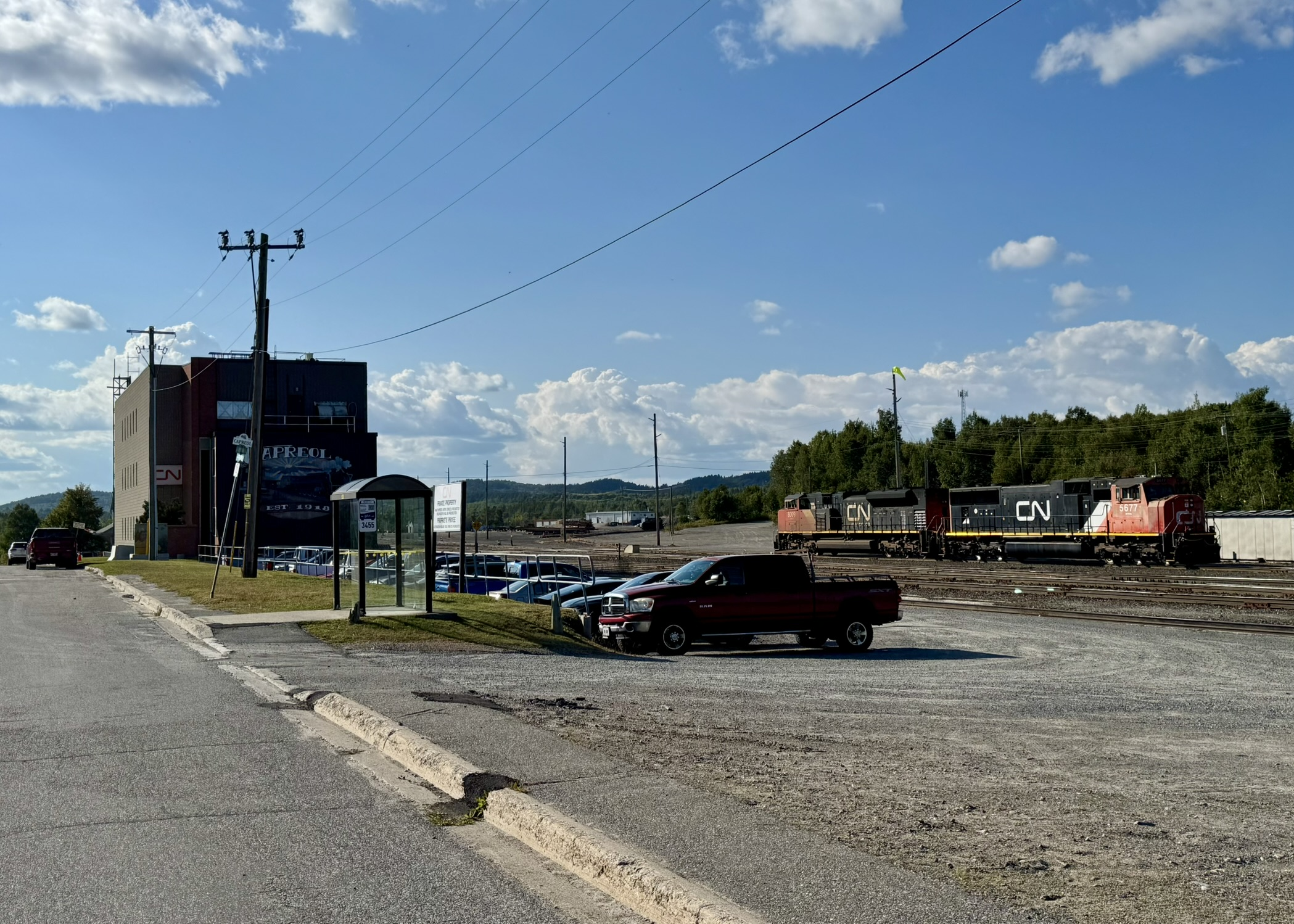
CNR Freight Yard

The nearby former home used by local Canadian Northern and Canadian National superintendents in Capreol has been converted into the Northern Ontario Railroad Museum, which showcases elements of Capreol and Northern Ontario's railway heritage.

== See also ==
- Sudbury Junction station
- Sudbury station (Ontario)
- Sudbury Ontario Northland Bus Terminal
- Sudbury Airport - (IATA: YSB, ICAO: CYSB)
