= GO Transit fares =

GO Transit is the inter-regional transportation authority of the Golden Horseshoe, which includes the Greater Toronto and Hamilton Area. It is Canada's oldest regional transit system, first serving passengers in 1967.

== Fare zones ==
The service area of GO Transit is divided into a number of fare zones, each of which belonging to a number of fare corridors. Fares on GO Transit are based on the distance between originating and destination fare zones. Tickets between two fare zones are valid for travel between the two fare zones stated on the ticket, as well as between any two fare zones that lie between them on the same fare corridor. Tickets are not generally issued between two fare zones on different corridors, with the following notable exceptions:

- Due to all-day GO train service and the interlining of the Lakeshore West line and the Lakeshore East line, tickets may be issued for trips starting in a fare zone on one line and ending in a fare zone on the other. Similarly, due to the number of GO bus connections between stations on the Lakeshore West line and the Milton line (including Square One Bus Terminal, but excluding Lisgar GO station), tickets may be issued for trips starting in a fare zone in Mississauga or Milton outside of the Lakeshore West line and fare zones on either of the Lakeshore lines.
- Tickets are generally issued for trips between a fare zone inside Toronto and a fare zone outside the City of Toronto, even if they lie in different fare corridors; such tickets are valid between the fare zone outside the City of Toronto to any fare zone inside the City of Toronto for which the ticket value is equal or less. (For example, a ticket from Square One Bus Terminal to Scarborough Centre Bus Terminal would also be valid for trips to Kennedy station, as the trips are of equal value, even though all three locations are on different fare corridors.) Note that Milliken GO Station, despite being physically located within the City of Toronto, is considered to be in a fare zone outside of the City of Toronto for historical reasons.

As all GO Transit tickets are only valid for continuous trips of no more than two and a half hours, multiple tickets may be needed for longer trips.

=== List of existing fare zones ===
Fare zones 1–9, 19, 59, 70, 77, 79, 89 and 90 (shaded in green) are located within Toronto.

No.	Name	Stops	Corridor
2	Toronto	Union Station; Union Station Bus Terminal	(all corridors except Highway 407)
2	Toronto	Exhibition GO Station	Lakeshore West line Niagara Falls
2	Toronto	Bloor GO Station	Kitchener line
3	Etobicoke Centre	Kipling GO Station	Milton line
4	Metro Northwest	Mount Dennis station Weston GO Station; Etobicoke North GO Station	Kitchener line
5	North York	Oriole GO Station; Old Cummer GO Station	Richmond Hill line
5	North York	Finch Bus Terminal; Sheppard–Yonge station	Mississauga/North York; Milton (via Highway 401); Trinity Common (via Highway 407); Pearson Airport (via Highway 401); Keswick; Oshawa (via Highway 401)
5	North York	York Mills Bus Terminal	Mississauga/North York; Milton (via Highway 401); Trinity Common (via Highway 407); Brampton (via Highway 427); Kitchener line Oshawa (via Highway 2)
5	North York	Yorkdale Bus Terminal	Mississauga/North York; Milton (via Highway 401); Kitchener line Brampton (via Highway 427); Pearson Airport (via Highway 401); East Gwillimbury (via Highway 400); Oshawa (via Highway 2)
6	Scarborough South	Danforth GO Station; Scarborough GO Station	Beaverton; Lakeshore East line Peterborough; Stouffville line
7	Scarborough Centre	Agincourt GO Station	Stouffville line
7	Scarborough Centre	Scarborough Centre Bus Terminal	Highway 407 East; Oshawa (via Highway 2); Oshawa (via Highway 401); Durham College Express
8	Guildwood	Eglinton GO Station; Guildwood GO Station	Beaverton; Lakeshore East line Peterborough
9	Rouge Hill	Rouge Hill GO Station	Beaverton; Lakeshore East line Peterborough
10	Port Credit	Port Credit GO Station	Lakeshore West line Brantford; Niagara Falls
11	Cooksville	Dixie GO Station; Cooksville GO Station	Milton line
12	Clarkson	Clarkson GO Station	Lakeshore West line Niagara Falls; Brantford
13	Oakville	Oakville GO Station	Lakeshore West line Highway 407 West; Niagara Falls; Brantford
13	Oakville	Oakville Carpool Lot	Highway 407 West; Pearson Airport (via Highway 407)
13	Oakville	Sheridan College	Highway 407 West
14	Bronte	Bronte GO Station	Lakeshore West line Brantford; Niagara Falls
14	Bronte	Bronte Carpool Lot	Highway 407 West
15	Appleby	Appleby GO Station	Lakeshore West line Niagara Falls; Brantford
16	Burlington	Burlington GO Station	Lakeshore West line Niagara Falls; Brantford
16	Burlington	Burlington Carpool Lot	Highway 407 West; Niagara Falls
17	Aldershot	Aldershot GO Station	Lakeshore West line Niagara Falls; Brantford
18	Hamilton	Hamilton GO Centre	Lakeshore West line Hamilton Express; Highway 407 West; Pearson Airport (via Highway 407)
18	Hamilton	West Harbour GO Station	Lakeshore West line Niagara Falls
18	Hamilton	McMaster University Bus Terminal	Brantford; Highway 407 West
19	North York	Downsview Park GO Station	Barrie line
19	Vaughan	Highway 407 Bus Terminal	Pearson Airport (via Highway 407); Highway 407; Waterloo
20	Square One	Square One Bus Terminal	Milton line Highway 407 West; Pearson Airport (via Highway 407); Mississauga/North York; Guelph; Waterloo
21	Streetsville	Streetsville GO Station	Milton line Highway 407 West
21	Streetsville	Erin Mills Transitway Station	Highway 407 West; Guelph; Waterloo
21	Streetsvile	Winston Churchill Transitway Station	Guelph; Waterloo
22	Meadowvale	Meadowvale GO Station; Meadowvale Town Centre	Milton line Highway 407 West; Milton (via Highway 401)
22	Meadowvale	Meadowvale Business Park	Milton (via Highway 401)
22	Meadowvale	Hurontario at 407 GO Park & Ride	Kitchener line Highway 407 West; Waterloo
23	Lisgar	Lisgar GO Station	Milton line
24	Milton	Milton GO Station	Milton line Milton (via Highway 401)
24	Milton	Milton Carpool Lot	Guelph; Waterloo
25	Mississauga	Dixie Transitway Station; Renforth Transitway Station	Mississauga/North York; Pearson Airport (via Highway 407)
26	Cambridge	SmartCentres iXpress Station; Sportsworld Carpool Lot iXpress Station	Waterloo
27	Kitchener	Kitchener railway station	Kitchener line
27	Waterloo	Wilfrid Laurier University (Laurier iXpress Station); University of Waterloo (UW Davis iXpress Station)	Waterloo
27	Kitchener	Charles St. Transit Terminal	Kitchener line Waterloo
28	Pontypool	Clarington North Carpool Lot	Peterborough
29	Millbrook	Cavan/Millbrook Carpool Lot	Peterborough
30	Peterborough	Peterborough Transit Terminal; Trent University; Peterborough Carpool Lot	Peterborough
31	Malton	Malton GO Station	Kitchener line Bolton
31	Malton	Toronto Pearson International Airport	Pearson Airport (via Highway 407); Pearson Airport (via Highway 401)
32	Bramalea	Bramalea City Centre Terminal	Kitchener line Brampton (via Highway 427); Trinity Common (via Highway 407)
32	Bramalea	Trinity Common Bus Terminal; Williams Pkwy at 410 Carpool Lot	Trinity Common (via Highway 407)
32	Bramalea	Bramalea GO Station	Kitchener line Brampton (via Highway 427); Trinity Common (via Highway 407); Highway 407 West; Waterloo
33	Brampton	Brampton GO Station; Brampton Bus Terminal	Kitchener line Orangeville; Brampton (via Highway 427)
33	Brampton	Shoppers World Terminal	Kitchener line
34	Mount Pleasant	Mount Pleasant GO Station	Kitchener line
35	Georgetown	Georgetown GO Station	Kitchener line
37	Acton	Acton GO Station	Kitchener line
38	Rockwood		Kitchener line
39	Guelph	Guelph Central GO Station	Kitchener line Guelph
39	Guelph	University of Guelph	Kitchener line Highway 407 West; Guelph
39	Aberfoyle	Aberfoyle GO Park and Ride	Guelph; Highway 407 West; Waterloo
40	Erindale	Erindale GO Station	Milton line
41	Victoria		Orangeville
42	Caledon	Caledon Carpool Lot	Orangeville
43	Orangeville	Orangeville Mall; Orangeville GO Park & Ride; Orangeville Carpool Lot	Orangeville
44	East Gwillimbury	East Gwillimbury GO Station	East Gwillimbury (via Highway 400); Barrie line
45	Queensville	Queensville Carpool Lot	Keswick
46	Keswick	Keswick Carpool Lot	Keswick
47	Stratford	Stratford station	Kitchener line
50	Richmond Hill	Richmond Hill GO Station	Richmond Hill line
50	Richmond Hill	Major Mackenzie at Highway 404 Carpool Lot	Keswick
51	Brooklin		Beaverton; Highway 407 East
51	Myrtle		Beaverton
56	Bolton South	Bolton GO Park & Ride Lot	Bolton
58	Bolton		Bolton
59	Long Branch	Long Branch GO Station	Lakeshore West line Niagara Falls; Brantford
60	Langstaff	Langstaff GO Station	Richmond Hill line
60	Langstaff	Richmond Hill Centre Terminal	Pearson Airport (via Highway 407); Highway 407 East
61	Maple—Rutherford	Rutherford GO Station; Maple GO Station	Barrie line
61	Maple	Major Mackenzie at Highway 400 Carpool Lot	East Gwillimbury (via Highway 400)
62	King	King City GO Station	Barrie line
63	Aurora	Aurora GO Station	Barrie line
63	Aurora	Aurora Carpool Lot	Barrie line Keswick
64	Newmarket	Newmarket GO Station	Barrie line
64	Newmarket	Newmarket Bus Terminal; Highway 9 at 400 Carpool Lot	East Gwillimbury (via Highway 400)
64	Newmarket	Davis Dr at 404 Carpool Lot	Keswick
65	Bradford	Bradford GO Station	Barrie line
66	Deerhurst		Barrie line
67	Churchill		Barrie line
68	Barrie South	Barrie South GO Station	Barrie line
69	Barrie	Allandale Waterfront GO Station	Barrie line
70	Milliken	Milliken GO Station	Stouffville line
71	Unionville	Unionville GO Station	Stouffville line Highway 407 East
72	Markham—Centennial	Centennial GO Station; Markham GO Station	Stouffville line Highway 407 East
73	Mount Joy	Mount Joy GO Station	Stouffville line Highway 407 East
74	Stouffville—Lincolnville	Stouffville GO Station; Old Elm GO Station	Stouffville line
75	Goodwood		Stouffville line
76	Uxbridge		Stouffville line
77	Kennedy	Kennedy station	Stouffville line
78	Gormley	Gormley GO Station	Richmond Hill line
79	Mimico	Mimico GO Station	Lakeshore West line Niagara Falls; Brantford
80	Stoney Creek	Confederation GO Station	Lakeshore West line Niagara Falls
81	Grimsby	Grimsby Carpool Lot	Niagara Falls
82	Lincoln	Beamsville Carpool Lot	Niagara Falls
83	St. Catharines	St. Catharines railway station Fairview Mall	Niagara Falls
84	Niagara-on-the-Lake	Niagara College	Niagara Falls
84	Niagara Falls	Niagara Falls railway station Niagara Falls Transit Terminal; Niagara Falls GO Park & Ride Lot	Niagara Falls
85	Brantford	Brantford Bus Terminal	Brantford
86	Brougham	Brougham Carpool Lot	Highway 407 East
88	Durham College	Durham College; Ontario Tech University	Durham College Express; Highway 407 East
89	Malvern	Centennial College Morningside Campus; University of Toronto Scarborough	Highway 407 East
90	North Rouge		Oshawa (via Highway 2)
91	Pickering	Pickering GO Station	Beaverton; Lakeshore East line Highway 407 East; Peterborough
92	Ajax	Ajax GO Station	Beaverton; Lakeshore East line Peterborough
93	Whitby	Dundas at 412 GO Park & Ride	Oshawa (via Highway 2)
93	Whitby	Whitby GO Station	Beaverton; Lakeshore East line Peterborough
94	Oshawa	Oshawa GO Station	Lakeshore East; Peterborough
94	Oshawa	Ritson GO Park & Ride	Lakeshore East
94	Oshawa	Oshawa Bus Terminal	Lakeshore East line Highway 407 East; Oshawa (via Highway 2)
95	Courtice	Courtice GO Park & Ride	Lakeshore East line
96	Bowmanville	Bowmanville GO Park & Ride	Lakeshore East line
97	Newcastle	Newcastle Carpool Lot	Lakeshore East line Peterborough
98	Bloomington	Bloomington GO Station	Richmond Hill line
100	Ohsweken	New Credit Variety & Gas Bar	Brantford

=== List of former fare zones ===
No.	Name	Stops	Corridor
1	Toronto Coach Terminal		
36	Silvercreek		Kitchener line
47	Island Grove	Metro Rd. at Woodbine Ave.	Kitchener line
48	Sutton	High St. & Burke St.	
48	St. Marys	St. Marys station	Kitchener line
49	Virginia		
49	London	London station	Kitchener line
52	Port Perry	Port Perry Terminal	Barrie line
53	Saintfield		Barrie line
54	Sunderland	Albert St. @ River St.	Barrie line
55	Beaverton	Simcoe St. @ Mara Rd.	Barrie line
87	Greenwood		Lakeshore East line

== Fare classes ==
GO Transit offers six passenger fare classes: child, adult, senior, youth, Canadian Armed Forces (CAF), military veterans and post-secondary students. Youth fares apply for passengers ages 13–19 inclusive and senior fares are available for passengers over the age of 65. As of March 1, 2025, passengers under the age of 12 along with the CAF and military members can ride free on all GO Transit trains and buses.

Post-Secondary Student fares are only available for those with acceptable student identification:

- Full-time students of post-secondary institutions anywhere in Canada (not necessarily within GO Transit's service area) for which student identification is reissued each year may use their school-issued student identification for proof of student fare qualification.
- Students at Durham College, Ontario Tech University, and Trent University's Oshawa Campus require their school-issued student identification for proof of student fare qualification.
- Students at Centennial College, Humber College, Michener Institute, Mohawk College, Niagara University, Sheridan College, and Trent University's Peterborough campus require a sticker to be affixed to their school-issued student identification for proof of student fare qualification.
- Students at McMaster University holding a Hamilton Street Railway U-Pass require their school-issued student identification for proof of student fare qualification.
- All other post-secondary students require the GO Transit student ID. It is valid for full-time students from October of one year to October of the next year, as long as the student retains full-time status. GO Transit student ID application forms may be obtained from the registrar's office of their institutions. These must be processed at GO Transit's offices at Union Station before they may be used as proof of student fare qualification. Students at Seneca College, Toronto Metropolitan University, York University, University of Waterloo, and the University of Guelph may also obtain GO Transit student identification online, while students at the University of Toronto's St. George, Mississauga, and Scarborough campuses may obtain their GO Transit student identification on campus.

== Fare types ==
Up until July 31, 2012, GO Transit offered five types of fares:

- Single-ride tickets are for one single journey between two fare zones. These expire four hours after purchase, and are not refundable.
- Two-ride tickets are for two single journeys between two fare zones. These do not expire, but are not refundable.
- Day passes are for unlimited journeys between two fare zones from 3AM one day to 3AM the next. These are not refundable.
- Ten-ride tickets are for 10 single journeys between two fare zones. These do not expire, and unused portions may be refunded 30 days after purchase.
- Monthly passes are for unlimited journeys between two fare zones for one calendar month. They are available for purchase 10 days before the month to 14 days into the month, and must be signed by its user for it to be valid. These may be refundable.

GO Transit stopped selling two-ride and ten-ride tickets on June 1, 2012, and stopped accepting two-ride and ten-ride tickets on July 31, 2012, in favour of using Presto Cards exclusively; paper monthly passes have been discontinued since 1 January 2013; day passes remain available for purchase. Passengers may convert any unused rides on their tickets to equivalent value on a Presto Card before the end of 2012.

There is no distinction between bus and train service.

Fares between two fare zones for a particular type of ticket and passenger category are based on multiples of the standard (adult single-ride) fare as follows:

Fare multiples for ticket users
	Adult	Senior	Student
Single-Ride	1	0.5	–
Day Pass	2	1	–
Monthly Pass	34	20	28

Fares are rounded to the nearest $0.05 for single-ride fares and day passes and $1.00 for monthly passes, after fare multiples are applied. The minimum adult single-ride fare (for travel on GO Transit within one fare zone) is always $4.50; other fares depend on the fare zones travelled.

=== Presto cards and contactless credit and debit cards ===
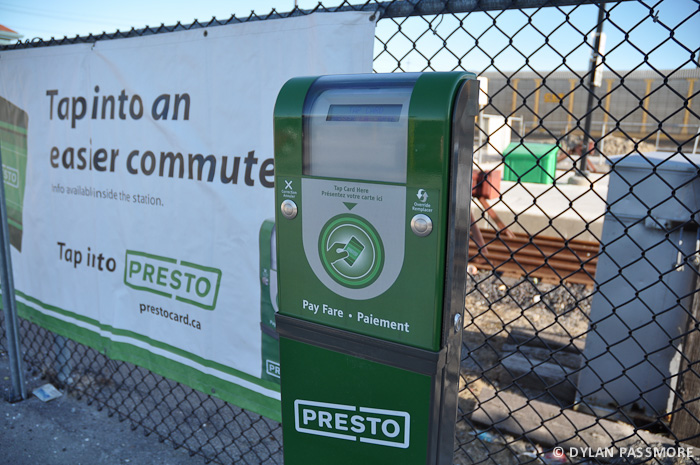
An old PRESTO card reader at Oshawa station. These readers have since been replaced with newer readers with an LCD screen and the ability to read credit and debit cards.

Presto cards and contactless credit and debit cards are accepted on GO Transit. Passengers must tap their cards against the reader upon embarking and disembarking the train or bus. Upon embarking, the minimum fare ($3.70) is always deducted from Presto cards, with fare adjustments performed as the passenger disembarks. With credit and debit cards, charges are processed at the end of the day as a single charge combining all the day's trips.

The following credit cards are accepted: VISA, MasterCard, American Express and Interac Debit cards.

Failure to tap the card upon disembarking ("missed tap-off") will cause the maximum fare to be deducted, under the assumption that the passenger travelled to the point furthest away from the origin point. (For example, passengers failing to tap off when boarding at Union Station will be assessed the fare travelling from Union Station to Kitchener GO Station, the point furthest away on any GO train route serving Union Station.) Passengers regularly travel by GO train may also set a "default trip" between two GO train stations, allowing them to avoid tapping their cards upon disembarking; passengers doing so will have the appropriate fare deducted upon embarking at either endpoint.

Customers using the Presto card receive further fare discounts via the 3-tiered monthly fare capping system, depending on the number of trips that have been made per month between two fare zones using the same Presto, credit or debit card for all trips in a calendar month.

Monthly fare capping structure
	Adult	Youth/post-secondary student	Senior
First 30 trips	0.8885	0.816	0.4735
Trips 31–35	0.8885	0.05	0.4735
Trips 36–40	0.1225	0.05	0.4735
Each trip thereafter	Free	Free	Free

If there are rides between different sets of fare zones, the discounts after the 30th trip (youths and post-secondary students) and 35th trip (adults) will be based on the total value of rides taken so far; the fare capping system is structured so that customers pay less over the course of a month compared to paying for a paper monthly pass ahead of time; the discrepancy is to encourage passengers to adopt the Presto card over the paper monthly pass.

=== E-tickets ===
E-tickets can be purchased from the ticketing section of GO Transit's website. They must be activated on a smartphone to be valid (they cannot be printed). Single-ride and return tickets cost the same as a paper ticket.

==== Weekend Passes and Weekday Group Passes ====
Other than single-ride and return tickets, the GO Transit e-ticketing website also offers One-Day Weekend Passes and Weekday Group Passes, which are valid for unlimited travel to any location on the GO Transit network within the validity period of the ticket, regardless of the origin and destination entered when purchasing the ticket. One-Day Weekend Passes are valid for one day on a Saturday, Sunday or statutory holiday for one person. Weekday Group passes are valid for one day from Monday to Friday, excluding statutory holidays, for a group of 2–5 people, depending on the type of pass purchased. These passes are available online only and must be activated on a smartphone to be valid (they cannot be printed). They are not valid on the Union Pearson Express. The prices are as follows:

Weekend Pass and Weekday Group Pass prices
Type	Price
One-Day Weekend Pass	$10
Weekday Group Pass for 2	$30
Weekday Group Pass for 3	$40
Weekday Group Pass for 4	$50
Weekday Group Pass for 5	$60

=== Fare integration ===
GO Transit offers fare integration services with local transit providers, as well as with Via Rail.

==== Via Rail integration ====
Via Rail offers interline tickets with GO Transit, where passengers may travel on GO Transit trains and connect with Via Rail trains at any GO station also offering Via Rail services (Aldershot GO Station, Brampton GO Station, Georgetown GO Station, Guelph Central GO Station, Guildwood GO Station, Kitchener GO Station, Niagara Falls railway station (Ontario), Oakville GO Station, Oshawa GO Station, St. Catharines railway station, and Union Station) or vice versa on one ticket; the Via Rail ticket acts as a GO transit proof of payment on the GO transit leg. Via Rail interline tickets are not valid for GO buses when trains are not running.

Via Rail also offered the GO-Via Pak, which allowed holders of GO Transit monthly passes or 10-ride tickets (between applicable fare zones) to ride between Union Station and five GO Stations (Aldershot, Brampton, Georgetown, Oakville, Oshawa) on Via Rail trains which stopped at those stations. The GO-Via Pak was priced at the difference between 10 adult single fares and the equivalent 10 adult economy fares on Via Rail. The GO-Via Pak could not be used with the Presto Card. The GO-VIA Pak was no longer sold after December 15, 2012, and was not accepted as of January 1, 2013.

==== Local transit integration ====
Fare integration services may exist between GO Transit and local transit providers, where customers may ride GO buses within local service areas using appropriate local proof-of-payment (tickets and/or passes) at no additional cost; GO Transit will also issue a transfer for further travel on local transit providers upon request. Passengers paying by cash or travelling outside the local service area must pay GO transit fares. Passengers using Presto Card will be assessed GO transit fares, although plans are in place for local fares to be assessed instead of GO transit fares whenever they are lower.

- Durham Region Transit – Though in the past, all GO bus routes serving Durham Region were integrated with DRT, since the launch of DRT Pulse only the routes not covered by DRT Pulse are integrated. This includes Route 71, 81, 88, 90, and 91, the latter two only between Newcastle and Downtown Oshawa.
- York Region Transit (YRT) – No routes currently are integrated with YRT, though GO Transit had operated routes both on behalf of YRT and as a complement to YRT service in the past, before its eventual replacement with YRT routes. The last such route to have been integrated was Route 69 Sutton, which was replaced by YRT Route 50 Queensville.

==== GO Transit co-fares ====
As of February 26, 2024, most local transit systems that connect with GO Transit offer free admission so long as the customer swipes their Presto card on the connecting vehicle. In some cases (where applicable), passengers may also present their GO Transit proof-of-payment (a day pass or single-ride ticket) to the local transit operator.

Passengers using the Presto card or contactless credit card (where accepted) will automatically be assessed the co-fare where appropriate, depending on the status of the local transit operator's integration with the Presto Card or contactless credit card. If the local transit operator does not currently accept the Presto Card or contactless credit card, the co-fare is not applicable with these payment methods.

Transit agency	Presto card	Co-fare	Notes
Barrie Transit	No	Free	Valid to/from Barrie South GO Station or Allandale Waterfront GO Station.: Despite Barrie Transit having not adopted the Presto Card on its buses, the co-fare is also accepted for Presto Card holders.
Brampton Transit (includes Züm)	Yes	Free	Valid to/from any GO train station in Brampton (Brampton, Bramalea, Mount Pleasant), Lisgar GO Station and Malton GO Station in Mississauga, and Brampton Bus Terminal.: Also valid for GO buses connecting to/from Brampton Transit services when using the Presto Card or contactless credit card.; Co-fares are only accepted for single-ride and day pass tickets when connecting from GO Transit to BT services.
Burlington Transit	Yes	Free	Valid to/from any GO train station in Burlington (Aldershot, Appleby, or Burlington).: Also valid for GO buses connecting to/from Burlington Transit services when using the Presto Card or contactless credit card.
Durham Region Transit (DRT)	Yes	Free	Valid to/from any GO Station in Durham Region (Ajax, Oshawa, Pickering, or Whitby) or Rouge Hill GO Station in Toronto.: Also valid for GO buses connecting to/from DRT services when using the Presto Card or contactless credit card.; Co-fares are only accepted for single-ride tickets when connecting from GO Transit to DRT services. A full DRT fare is required when connecting to GO Transit from DRT on a GO Transit single-ride ticket.; Due to fare integration, DRT co-fares are not accepted on GO buses, and may not be used to connect between GO trains and GO buses; GO Transit fares will be assessed.
Grand River Transit (including iXpress and GRT MobilityPLUS)	No	Free	Valid to/from Kitchener GO Station. Only valid Kitchener GO train service times.
Guelph Transit	No	Free	Valid to/from Guelph Central GO Station and University of Guelph.: Co-fares are only accepted for single-ride tickets when connecting from GO Transit to Guelph Transit services. A full Guelph Transit fare is required when connected to GO Transit from Guelph Transit on a GO Transit single-ride ticket.
Hamilton Street Railway (HSR)	Yes	Free	Co-fares only available using Presto card or contactless credit card.
Milton Transit	No	Free	Valid at Lisgar and Milton GO Stations.
MiWay (Mississauga Transit)	Yes	Free	Co-fares only offered for Presto card and contactless credit card holders.
Oakville Transit	Yes	Free	Valid to/from any GO train station in Oakville (Bronte and Oakville), as well as Clarkson GO Station in Mississauga.: Also valid for GO buses connecting to/from Oakville Transit services when using the Presto Card or contactless credit card.
Toronto Transit Commission	Yes	Free	From January 7, 2018, until March 31, 2020, Presto card holders who transferred between GO Transit and Toronto Transit Commission (TTC) services were able to save up to $1.50 on their fares as part of a co-fare discount agreement. The discount was not offered for customers who use cash, paper tickets, tokens, or a monthly Metropass on Presto. The program was discontinued on April 1, 2020, after the Ontario government decided not to renew the contract to extend the discounted double fare program, meaning that customers will be charged the full fare when transferring between TTC and GO Transit services within the City of Toronto. On February 26, 2024, free transfers between GO and TTC became available.
Region of Peel TransHelp	No	?	
York Region Transit (YRT) (includes Viva and Toronto Transit Commission bus routes serving York Region, north of Steeles Avenue)	Yes	Free	Valid to/from any GO train station in York Region (Aurora, Centennial, East Gwillimbury, King City, Langstaff, Old Elm, Maple, Markham, Mount Joy, Newmarket, Richmond Hill, Rutherford, Stouffville, and Unionville), Milliken and York University GO Stations in Toronto, or Richmond Hill Centre Terminal.: Co-fares are only accepted for single-ride tickets when connecting from GO Transit to YRT services or TTC buses in York Region operating north of Steeles Avenue. Riders must use a Presto card or contactless credit card in order to receive their co-fare discount when transferring between Viva bus services and GO Transit since it is not possible to purchase discounted fares or tickets from curbside YRT/Viva single-ride ticket vending machines. A full YRT fare is required when connecting to GO Transit from YRT on a GO Transit single-ride ticket.; Enterprise Vivastation is considered part of Unionville GO Station for the purposes of transferring between GO Transit services and Viva Purple and Viva Green.; Though TTC routes serving or terminating at Steeles Avenue may briefly enter York Region upon switching from outbound to inbound service, these are not services operated by the TTC on behalf of YRT; and thus co-fares are not offered. There are presently no TTC routes that serve both York Region and serve either of the GO Stations in Toronto where the YRT co-fare is offered.; The TTC Times Two program is not valid when connecting to a TTC bus in York Region, even if connecting to a destination in Toronto.
