= Eglinton East LRT =

Proposed light rail line in Toronto, Ontario

Overview
- Status: Proposed
- Owner: City of Toronto
- Locale: Toronto, Ontario
- Termini: Kennedy; Malvern Town Centre; McCowan Road and Sheppard Avenue
- Stations: 27

Service
- Type: Light rail
- System: Toronto subway
- Services: 3 branches
- Operator: Toronto Transit Commission
- Rolling stock: Alstom Citadis Spirit

History
- Planned opening: TBD

Technical
- Line length: 18.6 kilometres (11.6 mi)
- Track gauge: 1,435 mm (4 ft 8 1/2 in) standard gauge

The Eglinton East LRT (EELRT), also known as the Scarborough East Rapid Transit Line (SERT), formerly known as the Scarborough Malvern LRT, is a proposed light rail line intended to be part of the Toronto subway system in Toronto, Ontario, Canada. The line would be entirely within the district of Scarborough. It was originally part of Transit City, a 2007 plan to develop new light rail lines along several priority transit corridors in the city.

Unlike Line 5 Eglinton, which is a Metrolinx project, the EELRT is a City of Toronto project. In 2022, the plan was that the EELRT be designed and operated as a distinct service from Line 5 Eglinton; both would terminate at Kennedy station with no connecting track. In November 2023, the estimated cost of the EELRT was CA$4.65 billion, with construction expected to occur between 2027 and 2034 if the project were to be approved and funded.

== History ==
=== Transit City initial proposal and cancellation ===
The Scarborough Malvern LRT was part of Toronto mayor David Miller's Transit City proposal announced on March 16, 2007, to be operated by the Toronto Transit Commission. This shorter 12-kilometre (7.5 mi) line was envisioned to terminate at Sheppard Avenue East and Morningside Avenue, where it would interchange with the proposed Sheppard East LRT. In 2008, the Scarborough Malvern LRT was included in Metrolinx's regional transportation plan The Big Move within that plan's 25-year horizon. In 2009, the initial design for the Scarborough Malvern LRT was completed. The design cut off west of Midland Avenue, leaving the question open for later design phases of how the line would interface with Kennedy station and whether the line would be an extension of Line 5 or a distinct service. The line was expected to cost approximately CA$1.26 billion, including vehicles, property, escalation and an apportioned cost of the maintenance and storage facilities. With construction originally scheduled to begin in 2014, the line was expected to open in 2019 as the last of the seven Transit City lines.

The Scarborough Malvern LRT was approved by Toronto City Council on September 30, 2009, and the environmental assessment received a notice to proceed from the Government of Ontario on December 15, 2009. After a change in municipal leadership, it was cancelled by Mayor Rob Ford on December 1, 2010, when he announced the cancellation of the entire Transit City initiative. While LRT lines Sheppard East, Finch West, and Eglinton were revived through a new agreement between the City of Toronto and Metrolinx, the Scarborough Malvern LRT was not included.

=== Revival as Crosstown extension ===
In 2016, the city council directed staff to resurrect and update the 2009 plan for the Scarborough Malvern LRT. The project was renamed the Eglinton East LRT. Until 2021, the city considered making the EELRT an eastward extension of Line 5 Eglinton.

In 2016, to complement the Scarborough subway extension (SSE), the planned extension of Line 2 Bloor–Danforth to Scarborough Town Centre, the City of Toronto drafted a plan to extend Line 5 Eglinton farther east into Scarborough to terminate at the University of Toronto Scarborough campus. On January 20, 2016, Toronto City Council approved revisions to the Scarborough subway plan that would include reviving much of the original plan for the Scarborough Malvern LRT as a 12-kilometre (7.5 mi) eastern extension of Line 5 Eglinton to University of Toronto Scarborough, rebranded as "Crosstown East", and later renamed "Eglinton East" in 2017. The extension would add 18 new stops east of Kennedy station and serve an estimated 43,400 additional riders per day (a ridership similar to that of the Line 4 Sheppard subway). The extension was expected to serve "neighbourhood improvement areas" (often low-income areas) such as Eglinton East, Scarborough Junction, Morningside, Scarborough Village and West Hill.

In November 2017, the project was mostly unfunded, with the cost estimated at $1.6 to $1.7 billion, with an estimated completion date of 2023. At a November 2017 public meeting, city staff presented the possibility of extending the Eglinton East LRT by six stops to Malvern Town Centre. The Malvern extension would be 4.2 to 4.7 kilometres (2.6 to 2.9 mi) long. The extension to Malvern Town Centre would have seven stops: at Pan Am Drive, Sheppard/Morningside, Brenyon Way, Murison Boulevard, Sheppard/Neilson, Wickson Trail, and Malvern Town Centre. The Malvern Town Centre spur was originally part of the Scarborough RT replacement.

In April 2019, Ontario premier Doug Ford, brother of Rob Ford, announced a plan for Toronto rapid transit that included the Eglinton West LRT (a westward extension of Line 5 Eglinton), the Scarborough subway extension of Line 2, the Yonge North extension of Line 1 Yonge–University and the Ontario Line. The Eglinton East LRT was noticeably not included and was left off the accompanying map.

By October 2020, the City of Toronto and the TTC were in the process of implementing bus-only lanes from Kennedy station to the University of Toronto Scarborough campus via Eglinton Avenue, Kingston Road and Morningside Avenue as part of the RapidTO bus rapid transit initiative, which approximates the route of the Eglinton East LRT. The lanes were anticipated to be fully installed and operational by that November. As well as "red carpet" bus lanes, bus stops were also consolidated to approximately the same configuration and frequency of proposed LRT stations, with certain lower-order curbside stops – such as those at Huntington Avenue, Brimley Road, Oswego/Barbados Roads and Torrance Avenue – being removed entirely.

In December 2020, the City of Toronto announced changes to the Eglinton East LRT proposal. The tunnel portal at Kennedy station would be extended eastwards to Huntington Avenue due to changes in the Scarborough Subway Extension project, which involved modifying the depth of the tunnel as well as adding a third subway track for service improvements. A station at Midland Avenue was moved underground as a result. A new maintenance and storage facility north of the University of Toronto Scarborough was added to the plan as a result of the Sheppard East LRT cancellation. Originally, both the Eglinton East LRT and the Sheppard East LRT were to have shared a maintenance and storage facility at Conlins Road east of Sheppard Avenue and Morningside. The other aspects of the project remained the same, including a tunnel under Kingston Road and Morningside Avenue due to traffic congestion at the Kingston/Lawrence and Morningside area.

In December 2020, the council directed staff to study the entire original route to Malvern Town Centre and begin a high-level design. Since the province had agreed to fund the Scarborough subway extension fully, Mayor John Tory requested in 2021 that the $1.2 billion the city had accumulated for that project be redirected to the Eglinton East line.

=== Standalone line ===
By 2022, city planning staff had concluded a through-service connection at Kennedy station was not feasible as an EELRT tunnel would be only 2 metres (6 ft 7 in) above the SSE tunnel at Kennedy station, and the SSE tunnel structure would not be strong enough to safely support an EELRT tunnel above it. Thus, city staff proposed a "distinct-service concept" for the EELRT. Doing so would result in lower construction costs, a shorter construction period, fewer private property impacts and design flexibility. With this flexibility, the EELRT would not need to conform to Line 5's technology, operations, and maintenance requirements. The city could choose another type of light-rail vehicle and would use the Conlins Yard as the line's maintenance and storage facility. Previously considered tunnels between Kennedy station and Midland Avenue and under Kingston Road would be replaced by surface alignments. The line could also be extended farther to the under-construction terminus of the Line 2 Scarborough extension at Sheppard Avenue and McCowan Road, where it could also meet with an extended Line 4.

By May 2022, the estimated cost of the EELRT is $3.9 billion, with an expected opening in the early to mid-2030s. A July 2022 TTC report and a May 2023 city presentation referred to the proposed EELRT as Line 7 and gave the line a mint green colour.

By the end of 2023, the high-level design was expected to be completed, along with a draft of the environmental project report (EPR) and the start of the transit project assessment process (TPAP). Public consultation began in May 2023.

During the 2023 Toronto mayoral by-election, the topic of a future EELRT connecting to Pan Am Sports Centre and the University of Toronto Scarborough campus, and later to Sheppard–McCowan, was frequently discussed by candidates.

In November 2023, the project design was ten percent complete, and the total revised cost of the project was $4.65 billion. At the time, the province (through Metrolinx) was considering extending Line 4 Sheppard east of Don Mills station with the potential of overlapping the EELRT route along Sheppard Avenue. Thus, in case of overlap, city planners proposed to adjust the EELRT alignment. There was also the possibility that the preferred site for the EELRT maintenance and storage facility at Sheppard Avenue and Conlins Road might not be available. Thus, city planners would look at other potential sites as a contingency.

By May 2024, the City of Toronto had completed the 10-percent design and started a Transit and Rail Project Assessment Process, a streamlined environmental assessment that could take up to 185 days to complete. The project team recommended against a request by city council to add an extra stop at Morningside Park located south of Ellesmere Road because of the steep slope along Morningside Avenue at the eastern park entrance.

On April 9, 2026, Mayor Olivia Chow recommended city council rename the line the Scarborough East Rapid Transit Line (SERT). Feedback during consultations had many individuals commenting that Eglinton Avenue East was less than one-third of the entire route. Provincial transportation minister Prabmeet Sarkaria stated that the government did not have the line on its list of priorities.

== Route ==
Eglinton East LRT route

The EELRT line would run for 18 kilometres (11 mi), with 27 new proposed stops between Kennedy station and two termini, one at Sheppard Avenue East and McCowan Road and the other at Malvern Town Centre.

The southern terminus of the line would be at Kennedy station at Kennedy Road and Eglinton Avenue, with connections to Line 2 Bloor–Danforth, Line 5 Eglinton, and the Stouffville GO Line. The EELRT platform would be located on the east side of the Stouffville line and on the south side of Eglinton Avenue within its own off-street, ground-level station building. There would be a pedestrian tunnel connecting the EELRT station to the Line 5 concourse. From Kennedy station, the line would enter a reserved centre median on Eglinton Avenue before crossing Midland Avenue.

Running east on Eglinton Avenue East, the EELRT would pass Eglinton GO Station while continuing to Kingston Road. Just west of the Eglinton/Kingston stop, there would be a turnback and train storage track. Turning northeast on Kingston Road, the line would pass Guildwood GO Station. Between the Lawrence and Kingston/Morningside stops, there would be a storage track. The line would turn north on Morningside Avenue.

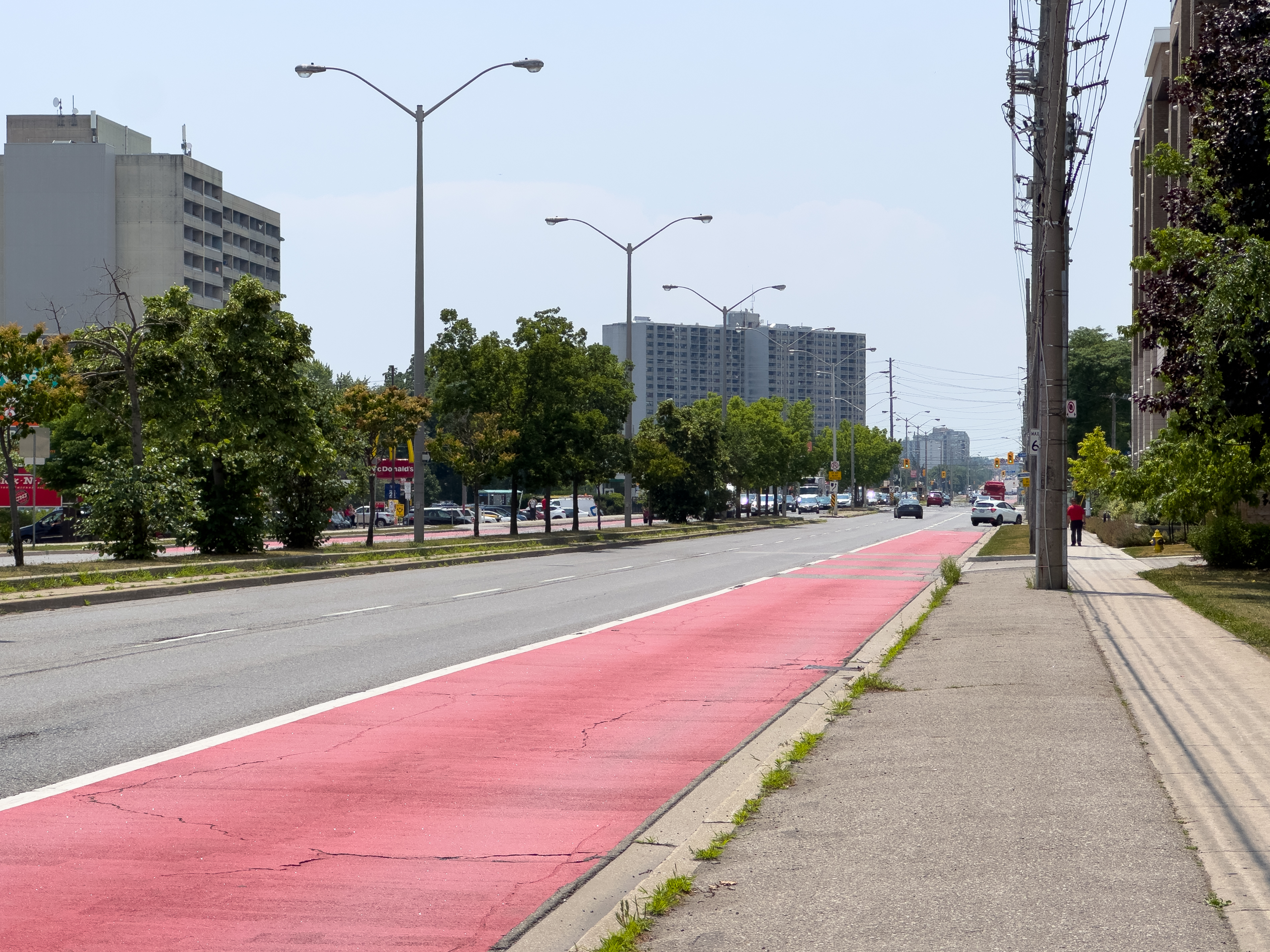
Portion of Kingston Road the Eglinton East LRT would follow in West Hill near Morningside Avenue

Along Morningside Avenue, the line would jog through the University of Toronto Scarborough campus (UTSC) after passing the Ellesmere stop and turning east on Ellesmere Road. The university is planning a new street on campus (named New Military Trail) that would be located northeast of the existing Military Trail. The EELRT would follow this new street from Ellesmere Road back to Morningside Avenue. UTSC would have two LRT stops: the UTSC stop with the southbound platform on Ellesmere Road and the northbound platform on New Military Trail, and the Pan Am Sports Centre stop on the south side of its namesake. There are plans for a new bus terminal and connections to the planned Durham–Scarborough bus rapid transit.

After leaving UTSC, the line would continue north along Morningside Avenue until Sheppard Avenue, where the Scarborough Malvern LRT would have originally met the cancelled Sheppard East LRT. The EELRT would then continue west on Sheppard Avenue to Neilson Road, where it would split into two branches. The first branch would travel north along Neilson Road and terminate at Malvern Town Centre.

The second branch would proceed further west from Neilson Road along the alignment of the cancelled Sheppard East LRT to McCowan Road. There, this branch would connect with Line 2 again, where the future terminus of Line 2 Bloor–Danforth at McCowan Road and Sheppard Avenue would be located. The EELRT would terminate on Sheppard Avenue on the east side of McCowan Road. There would be an underground pedestrian path to the station's planned bus terminal as well as to Line 2. A project map indicates that two tail tracks for the EELRT would extend to the west side of McCowan Road. As a later project, Line 4 Sheppard could be extended from Don Mills station to Line 2's new eastern terminus (also along the alignment of the cancelled Sheppard East LRT).

The EELRT tracks would be located in centre-of-street reserved lanes. There would be four road lanes separate from the LRT lanes along Eglinton Avenue East, Kingston Road, Morningside Avenue (north of Ellesmere Road) and Sheppard Avenue. There would be two road lanes along Morningside Avenue (south of Ellesmere Road) and along Neilson Road.

== Operations ==
The EELRT would use trains 50 metres (160 ft) long or less and use its own distinct vehicles (i.e. different from those used on Line 5 Eglinton) in order to better adapt to the line's conditions: no running in tunnels, shorter trains and platforms, and a better ability to climb grades to avoid expensive road infrastructure changes. Light-rail vehicles would need to handle grades in excess of 6 percent, such as along Morningside Avenue, and be able to make sharp, 90-degree turns at street intersections. The maximum speed would be 80 km/h (50 mph) on an exclusive right-of-way and 60 km/h (37 mph) on a semi-exclusive right-of-way.

Trains would operate every four to five minutes during peak periods. The EELRT would operate as three branches:

- Branch A would run between Kennedy and Sheppard–McCowan stations.
- Branch B would run between Kennedy and UTSC stations.
- Branch C would run between Sheppard–McCowan and Malvern Town Centre stations.

There would also be a short non-revenue branch on Sheppard Avenue from Morningside Avenue east to Conlins Road to provide access to a proposed maintenance and storage facility.

== Proposed stops ==
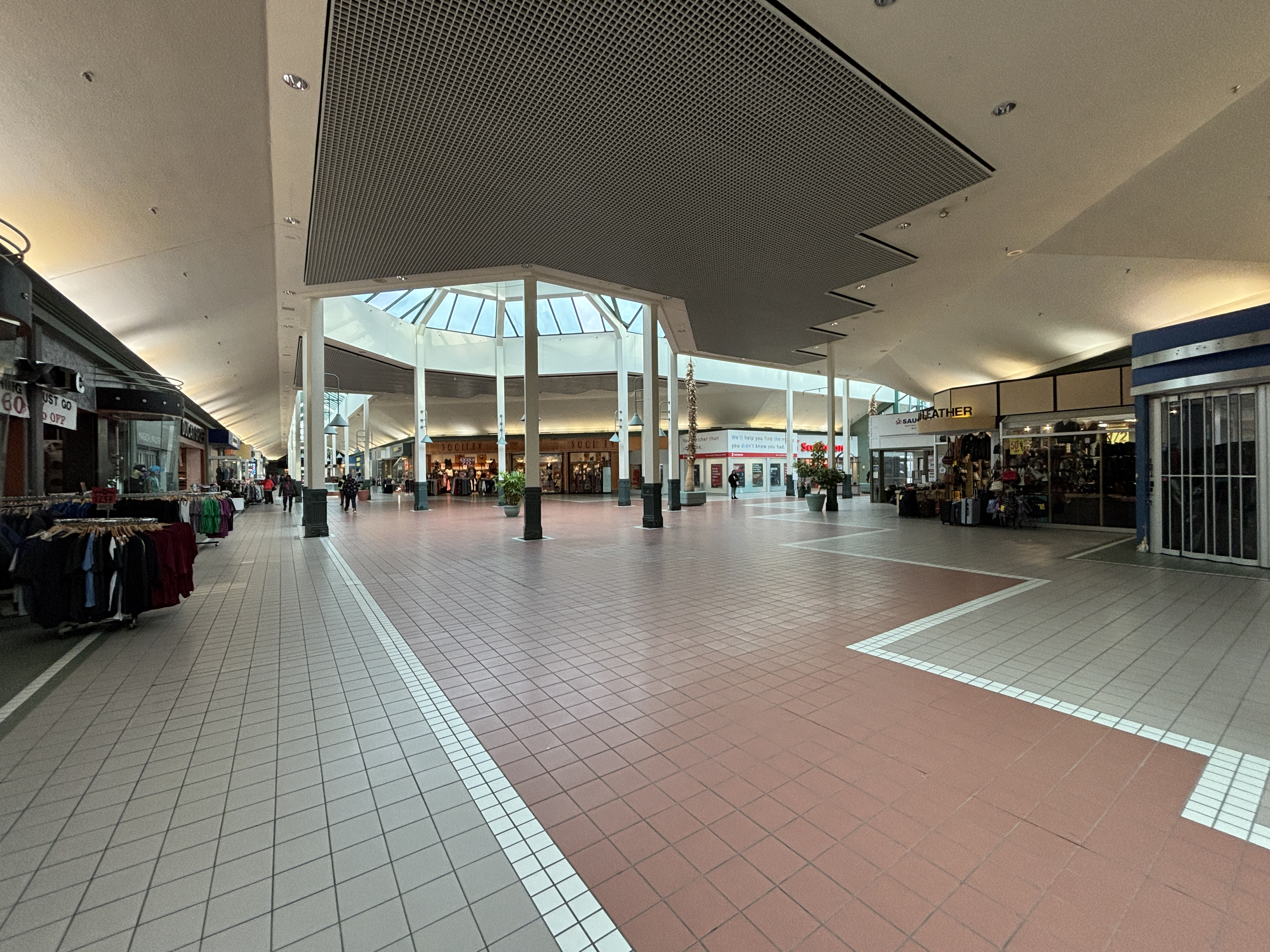
Malvern Town Centre is one of the stops along the Eglinton East LRT.

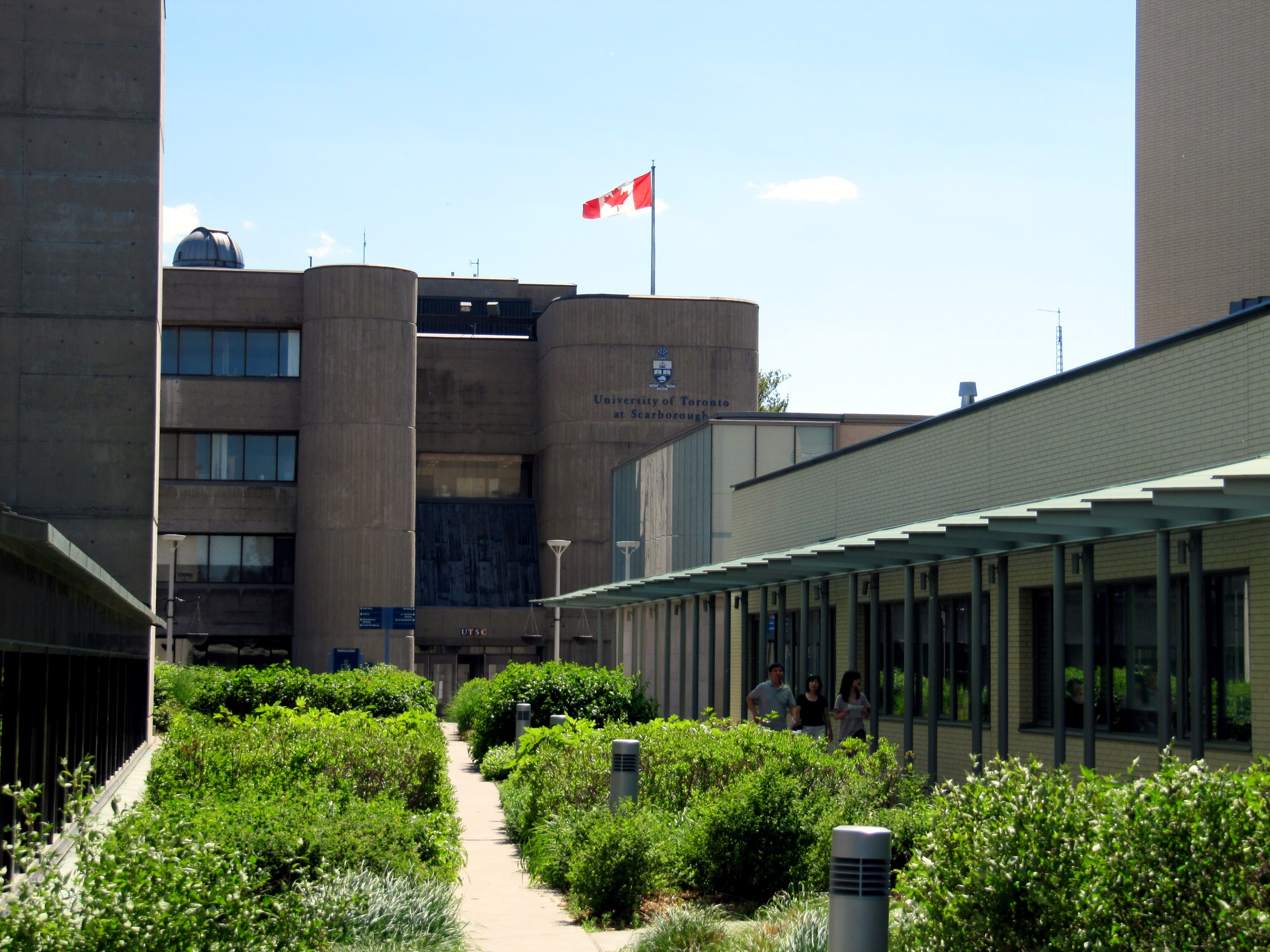
University of Toronto Scarborough campus (UTSC) is one of the stops along the Eglinton East LRT.

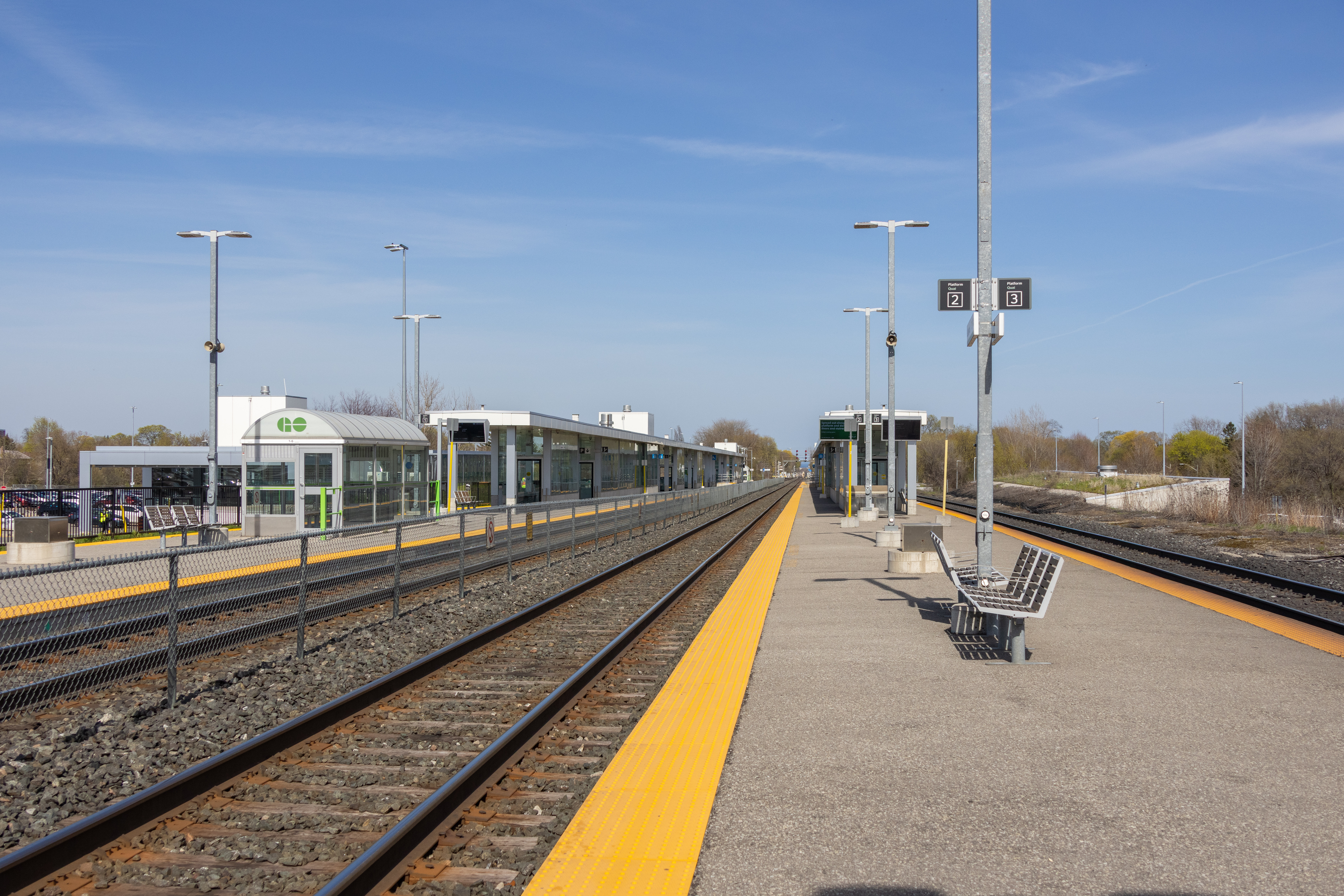
Guildwood GO Station is one of the stops along the Eglinton East LRT.

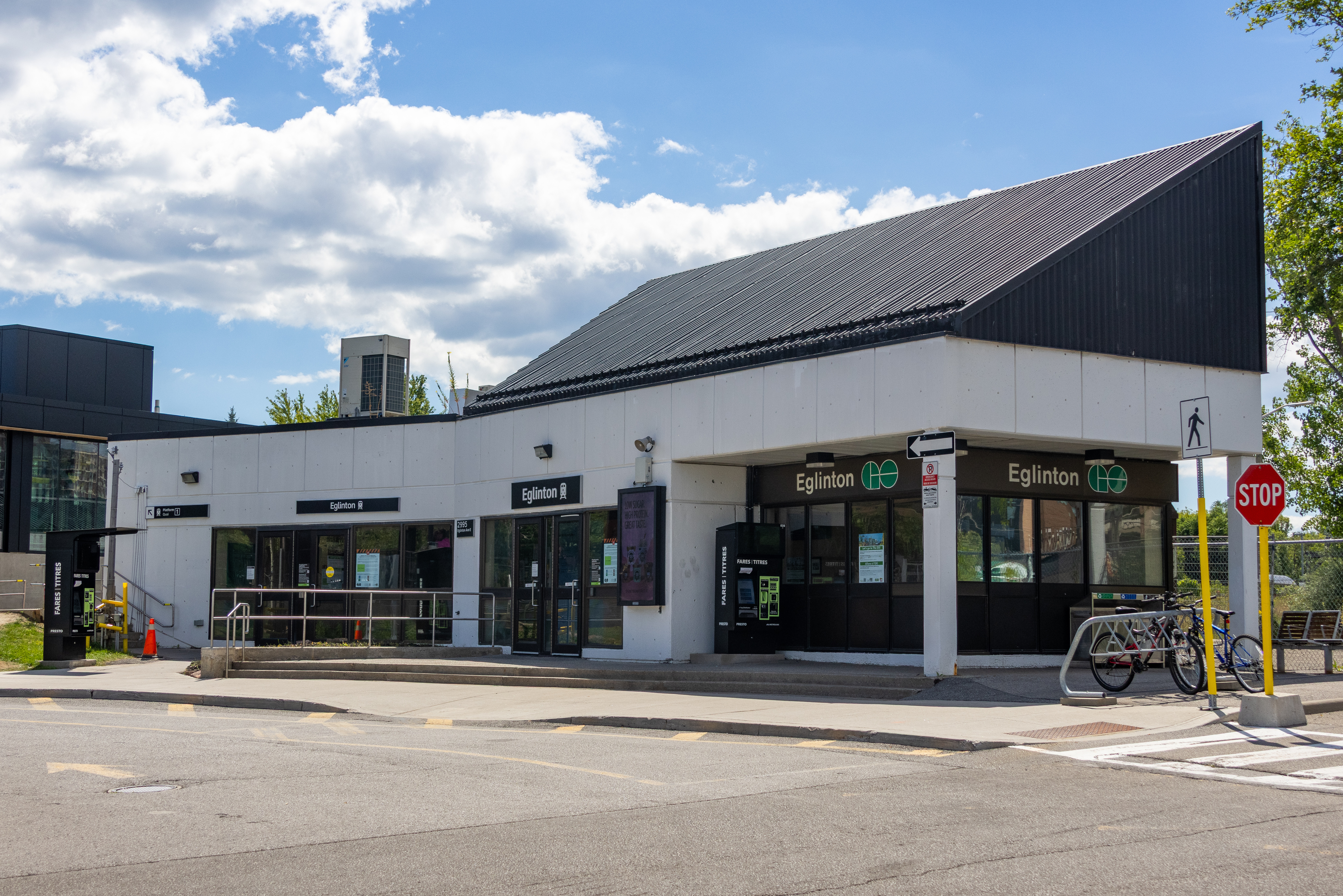
Eglinton GO Station is one of the stops along the Eglinton East LRT.

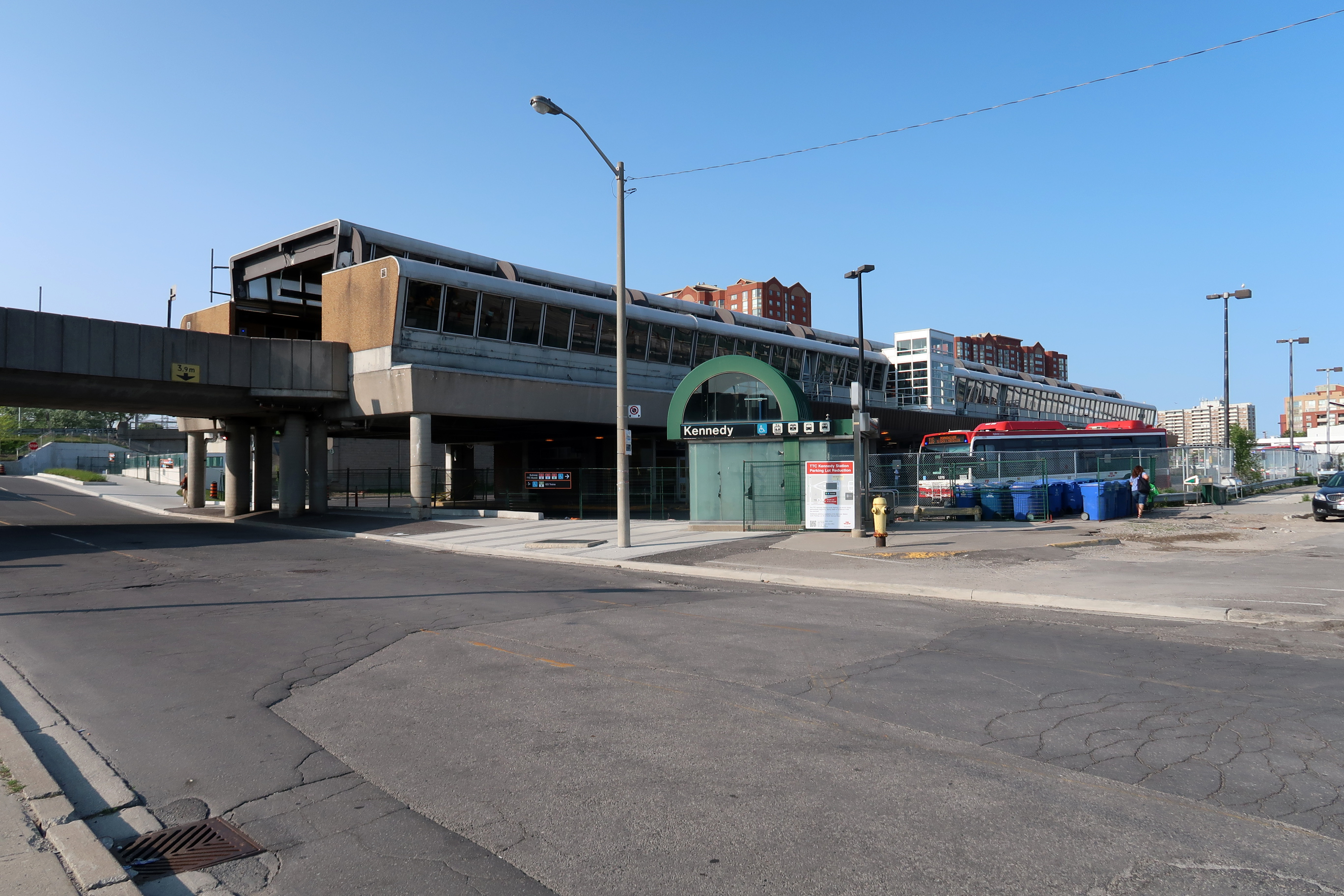
Kennedy station serves as the terminus of the Eglinton East LRT and provides a direct connection to Line 2, Line 5, and the Stouffville line, as well as the former Line 3 Scarborough and the Scarborough busway.

There would be 27 stops spaced 400 metres (1,300 ft) to 1 kilometre (0.62 mi) apart for an average of 670 metres (2,200 ft). All LRT platforms are 50 metres (160 ft) long. Unless otherwise noted below, all centre platforms are 15.5 metres (51 ft) wide, and all side platforms are 3 metres (9.8 ft) wide. With far-side platforms, an LRT train must cross a signalized intersection to reach the platform. Parallel platforms are two side platforms that face each other.

The proposed stops from north to south would be:

Proposed stops
Stop name	Description
Along Neilson Road
Malvern Town Centre	Parallel platforms located next to Malvern Town Centre north of Tapscott Road
Neilson–Berner	Far-side platforms located at Berner Trail and Wickson Trail
Along Sheppard Avenue East
Sheppard–McCowan	Centre platform (10 m [33 ft] wide) located east of McCowan Road; Connection to planned underground station for Line 2 Bloor–Danforth and later Line 4 Sheppard; Access to the underground station via elevators and staircases from the LRT platform on the surface
Shorting	Far-side platforms at Shorting Road and Havenview Road
Markham North	Far-side platforms at Markham Road
Washburn	Far-side platforms at Washburn Way and Lapsley Road
Sheppard–Neilson	Far-side platform on each of the north, east and west legs of the junction to Malvern Town Centre
Sheppard–Brenyon	Far-side platforms at Brenyon Way and Breckon Gate
Morningside–Sheppard	Centre platform on Sheppard Avenue west of Morningside Avenue
Along or near Morningside Avenue
Pan Am Sports Centre	Far-side platforms on New Military Trail at Pan Am Drive
UTSC	Centre platform north of Ellesmere Road on New Military Trail; Located at the bus terminal on the University of Toronto Scarborough campus (UTSC)
Ellesmere	Centre platform, south of Ellesmere Road on Morningside Avenue; Connection to proposed Durham–Scarborough bus rapid transit
West Hill	Far-side platforms, near West Hill Collegiate Institute
Along Kingston Road
Kingston–Morningside	Centre platform located west of Morningside Avenue; Centre storage track west of the platform
Kingston–Lawrence	Centre platform located west of Lawrence Avenue East; Storage track east of the platform
Galloway	Far-side platforms located at Galloway Road
Guildwood GO	Far-side platforms located adjacent to Guildwood GO Station with connection to Lakeshore East GO train line
Guildwood Parkway	Far-side platforms
Eglinton–Kingston	Centre platform located on Kingston Road at Eglinton Avenue; Storage track west of the platform
Along Eglinton Avenue East
Markham	Far-side platforms located at Markham Road
Mason	Far-side platforms located at Mason Road
Eglinton GO	Parallel platforms located adjacent to Eglinton GO Station; Connection to Lakeshore East GO train line
McCowan	Far-side platforms located at McCowan Road
Danforth	Parallel platforms located west of Danforth Road
Falmouth	Centre platform located east of Falmouth Avenue; Storage track located west of Falmouth Avenue
Midland	Centre platform located east of Midland Avenue; Storage track east of platform
Kennedy	Wedge-shaped centre platform (width: 13 m [43 ft] at west end, 5.5 m [18 ft] at east end); Enclosed within a weather-protected shed on the east side of the Stouffville line of GO Transit; Connection to the Scarborough busway between Kennedy station and Ellesmere Road via the former Line 3 Scarborough right-of-way; Connection to Line 2 Bloor–Danforth and Line 5 Eglinton

== See also ==
- Line 5 Eglinton
- Line 6 Finch West
- Toronto streetcar system
- Toronto subway
