= Rouge Hill GO Station =

Railway station in Toronto, Ontario, Canada

Rouge Hill
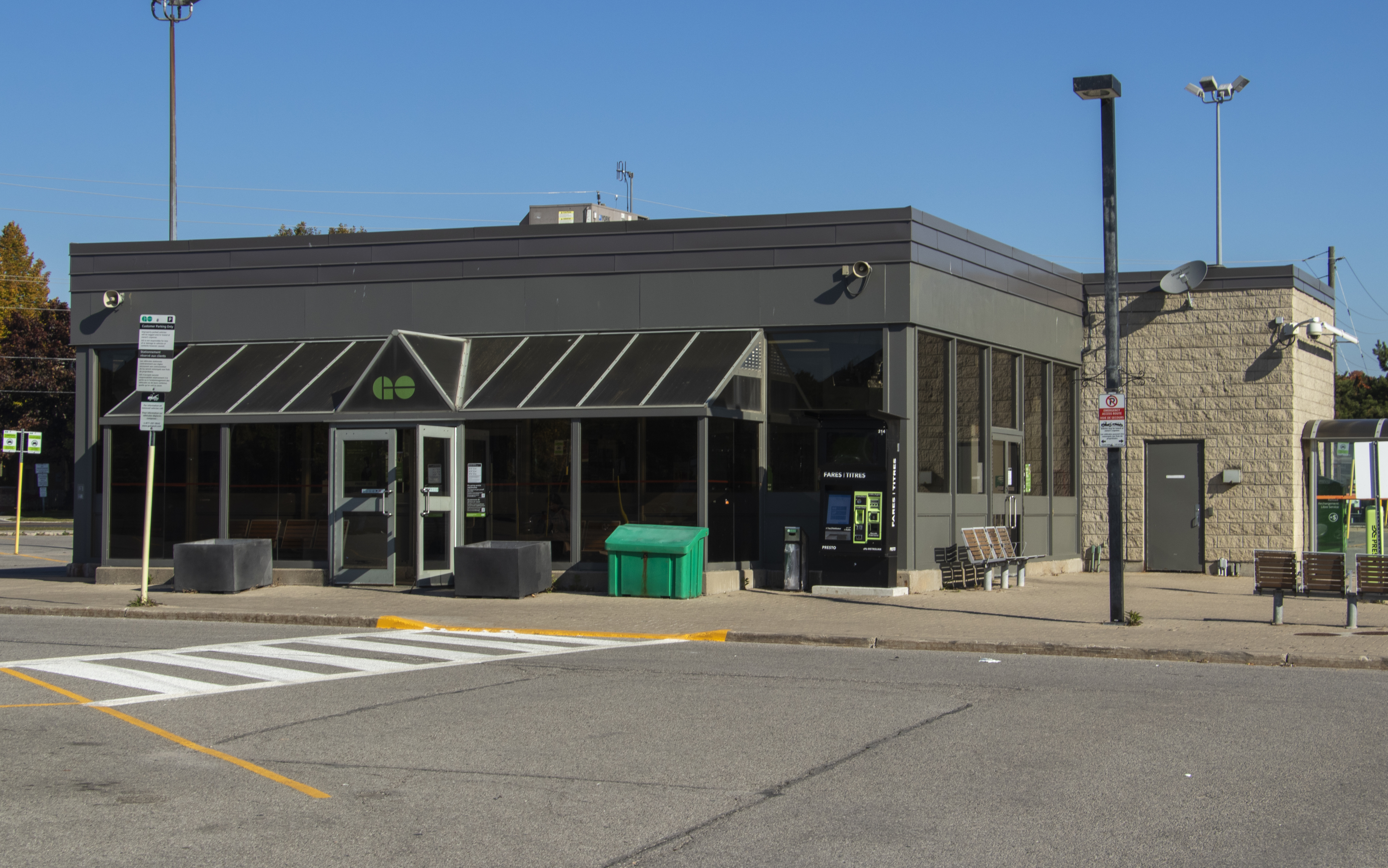

General information
- Location: 6251 Lawrence Ave. E. Scarborough, Ontario; Canada
- Coordinates: 43°46′49″N 79°07′50″W
- Owner: Metrolinx
- Platforms: 2 side platforms
- Tracks: 2
- Connections: Toronto Transit Commission; Durham Region Transit

Construction
- Structure type: Station building
- Parking: 1,041 spaces
- Cycle facilities: Yes
- Accessible: Yes

Other information
- Station code: GO Transit: RO
- Fare zone: 09

History
- Opened: May 23, 1967; 59 years ago
- Electrified: December 2036; 10 years' time (planned)

Passengers
- 2018: 520,000

Services
Preceding station	GO Transit	Following station
Guildwood towards Union	Lakeshore East	Pickering towards Oshawa
Future services
Preceding station	GO Transit	Following station
Guildwood towards Union	Lakeshore East (planned expansion)	Pickering towards Bowmanville
Former services at Port Union
Preceding station	Canadian National Railway	Following station
Scarboro toward Sarnia	Grand Trunk Railway; Main Line	Pickering toward Montreal
Location

Rouge Hill is a GO Transit train and bus station in Toronto, Ontario, Canada. On the Lakeshore East line, the station is located on the shore of Lake Ontario in the West Rouge neighbourhood of the district of Scarborough. It is a major commuter transfer point, with large parking lots and local bus services. Travelling eastwards, it is the last station in Toronto before the trains enter Durham Region.

== History ==
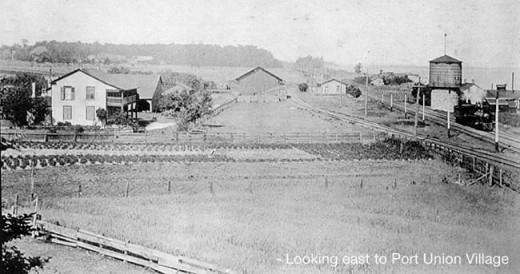
Looking east at Port Union Village and the Grand Trunk Railway station

The earliest Port Union Station was situated at Port Union Road, about half a kilometre west of the current location. The Grand Trunk Railway opened the station in 1856 on its Toronto-Montreal mainline, in what was then the small shipbuilding and fishing village of Port Union.

In the days of the steam locomotive, freight trains needed assistance to climb from lake level over the Scarborough Bluffs. Port Union was the easterly end of this helper service with a siding that ran behind the station for waiting locomotives, and a water tower and fuel tanks to resupply westbound trains. With the advent of diesel-electric power those facilities were no longer required and Canadian National Railway subsequently replaced the station with a utilitarian brick building.

A spur line branched off to service the Johns Manville plant which lay on the west side of Port Union Road on the south side of Lawrence Avenue down to the railway line.

Inspection of the CN station found that insufficient space was available there for parking and vehicle access from Port Union Road was poor. A triangle of land could be obtained 500 metres to the east, on the south side of Lawrence Avenue, that would provide enough space for parking and a bus loop with direct access from the street. When construction of the new GO Train facilities commenced, this was the site chosen for the Premier of Ontario John Robarts to ceremonially turn the first sod.

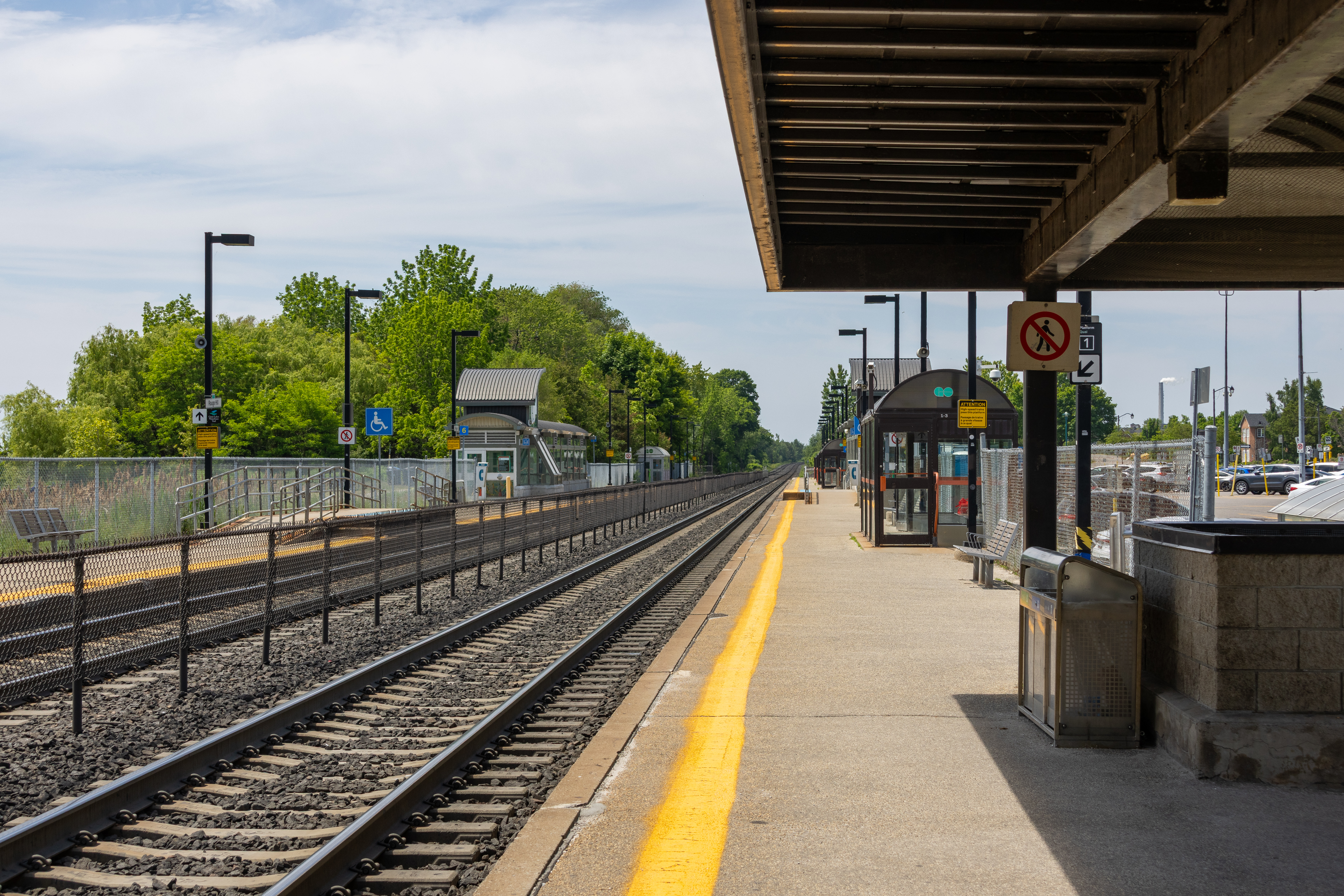
Station platform in 2025

In 2018, Loblaws signed a deal with Metrolinx to have a PC Express pick-up van at this station for online orders.

== Connecting bus routes ==
Toronto Transit Commission

All TTC buses enter the bus loop, with the exception of westbound 54A, 354 and 954 buses.

Route	Name	Additional information
38	Highland Creek	Westbound to Kennedy station via University of Toronto Scarborough and Scarborough Centre station
54A	Lawrence East	Westbound to Don Valley station Eastbound to Starspray Boulevard
85A	Sheppard East	Westbound to Don Mills station
200	Toronto Zoo	Westbound to Toronto Zoo (Seasonal service)
954	Lawrence East Express	Westbound to Don Valley station Eastbound to Starspray Boulevard (Rush hour service)
354	Lawrence East Blue Night	Westbound to Eglinton station Eastbound to Starspray Boulevard
385	Sheppard East Blue Night	Westbound to Sheppard–Yonge station

Durham Region Transit

- 103 Glenanna connecting the Altona Forest Neighbourhood, Rosebank Rd and Glenanna Rd. Monday to Friday peak hours.
