= Scarborough GO Station =

Railway station in Toronto, Ontario, Canada

Scarborough
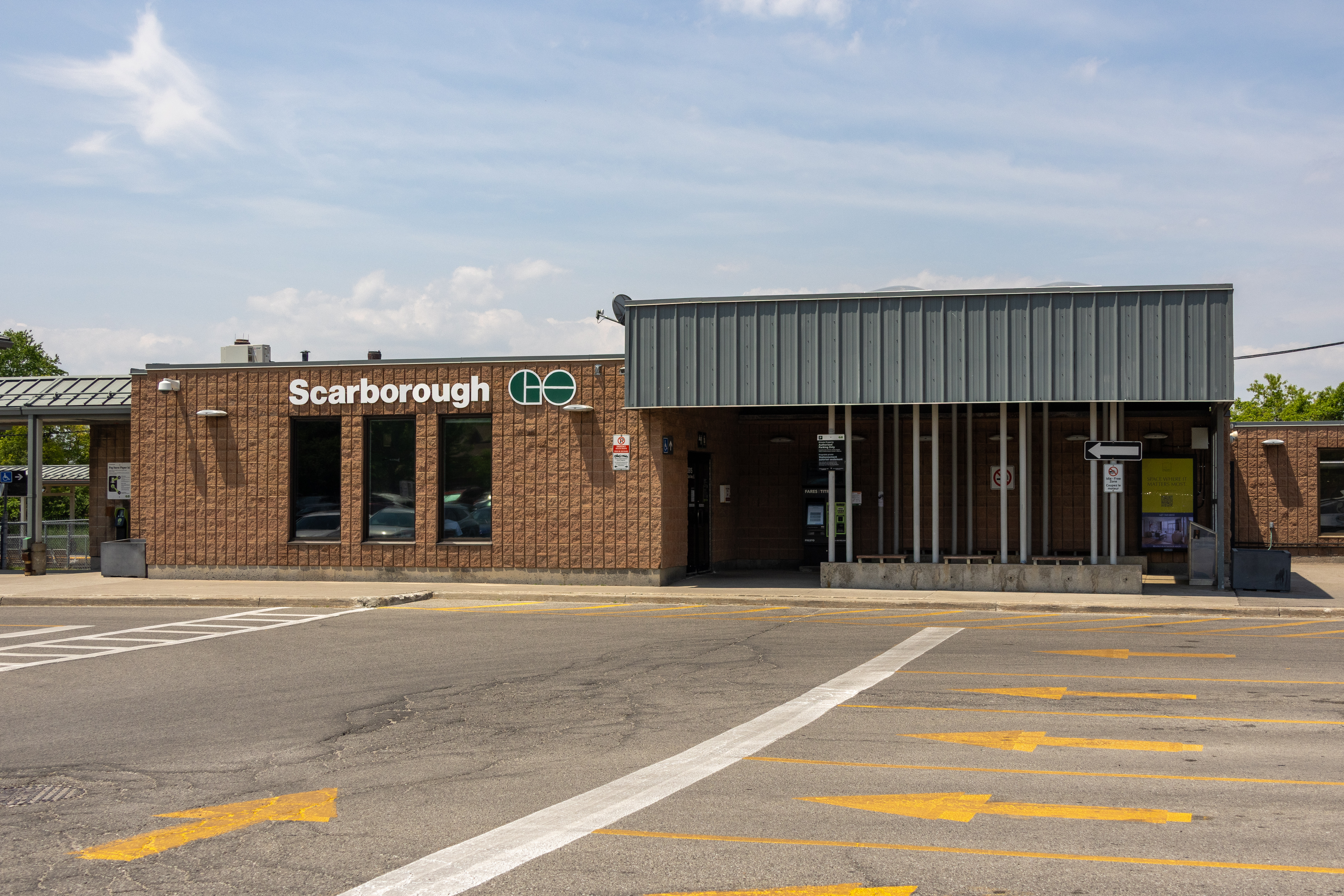
- Station building in 2026

General information
- Location: 3615 St. Clair Avenue East; Scarborough, Ontario; Canada
- Coordinates: 43°43′01″N 79°15′17″W
- Owner: Metrolinx
- Platforms: 1 side and 1 island platform
- Tracks: 3 + 1 bypass
- Connections: TTC buses

Construction
- Parking: 626 spaces
- Cycle facilities: 6 lockers
- Accessible: Yes

Other information
- Station code: GO Transit: SC
- Fare zone: 06

History
- Opened: May 23, 1967; 59 years ago
- Electrified: December 2036; 10 years' time (planned)

Passengers
- 2018: 225,000

Services
Preceding station	GO Transit	Following station
Danforth towards Union	Lakeshore East	Eglinton towards Oshawa
Stouffville does not stop here
Future services
Preceding station	GO Transit	Following station
Danforth towards Union	Lakeshore East (planned expansion)	Eglinton towards Bowmanville
Former services
Preceding station	Canadian National Railway	Following station
Danforth toward Sarnia	Grand Trunk Railway; Main Line	Port Union toward Montreal
Danforth toward Toronto	Toronto – Belleville via Peterboro	Agincourt toward Belleville
Danforth toward Toronto	Toronto – Port Hope via Peterboro	Agincourt toward Port Hope
Location

Scarborough GO Station is a train station served by GO Transit's Lakeshore East line, located in the Scarborough district of Toronto, Ontario, Canada.

The station is located south of St. Clair Avenue, just west of Midland Avenue, at the end of Reeve Avenue. A footpath connects the community through Natal Park, from the southwest end of the parking lot. Elevator construction was completed in mid-February 2010 making the station fully accessible.

Formerly known as Scarborough Junction, the station had originally been located northeast of St. Clair Avenue on the west side of Midland Avenue, where the Stouffville line now branches off to the north on what was previously the CN Uxbridge Subdivision. The first station built in the 1850s was replaced by a 1871 station that burned down in 1960 in what is now a vacant area. The Scarborough Junction neighbourhood was named after the station. In 1967, the present station was relocated and opened for GO Transit service.

== Connecting transit ==
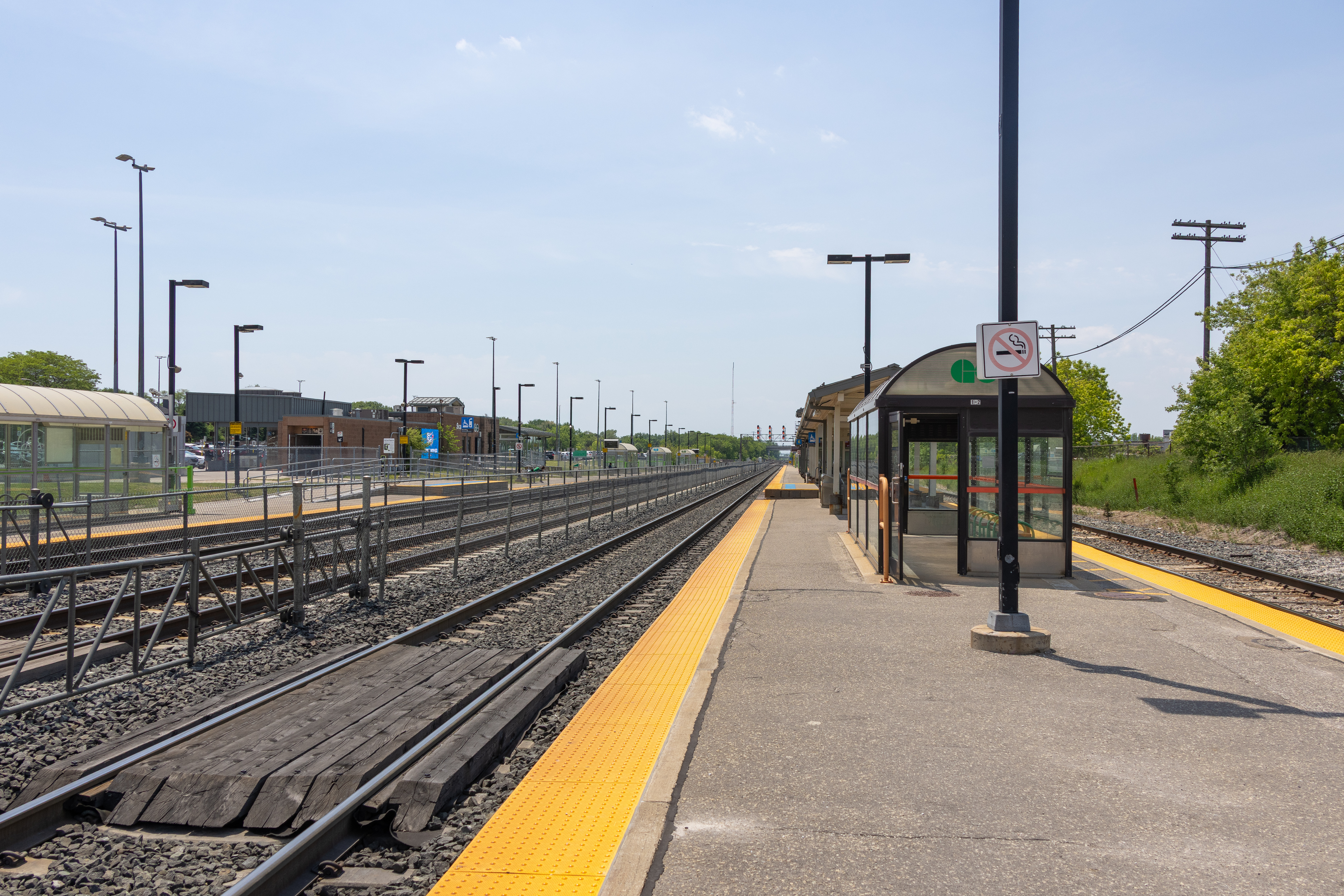
Station platform in 2026

Directly served on the street in front of the station by Toronto Transit Commission bus routes 9 Bellamy and 102 Markham Rd, and nearby routes 12 Kingston Rd, 16 McCowan, 20 Cliffside and 113 Danforth which also allow for discounted transfers when connecting to or from GO Transit trains at this station.
