= Scarborough Village =

- Neighbourhood
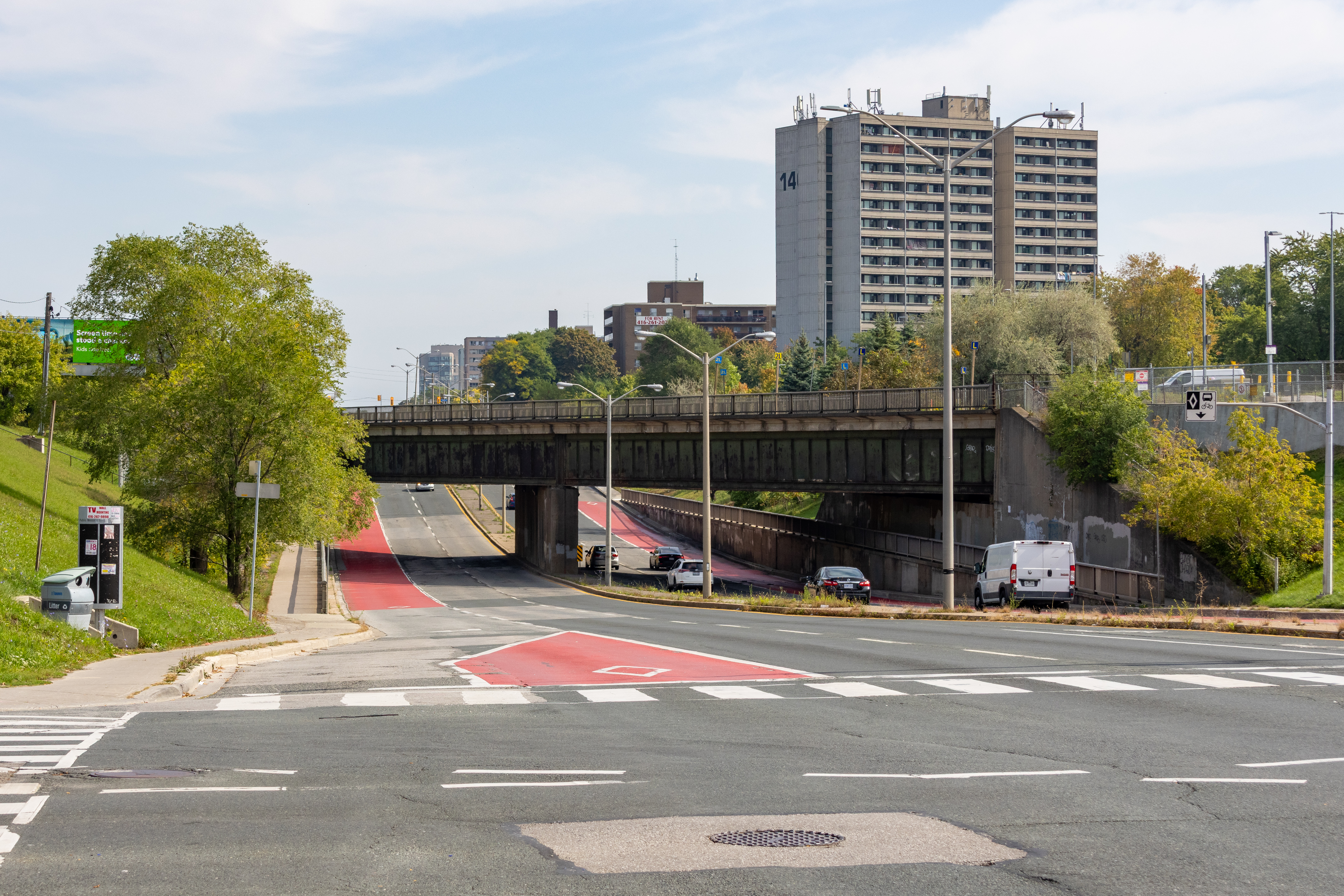
- Eglinton Avenue at the Eglinton GO Station, east of Bellamy Road

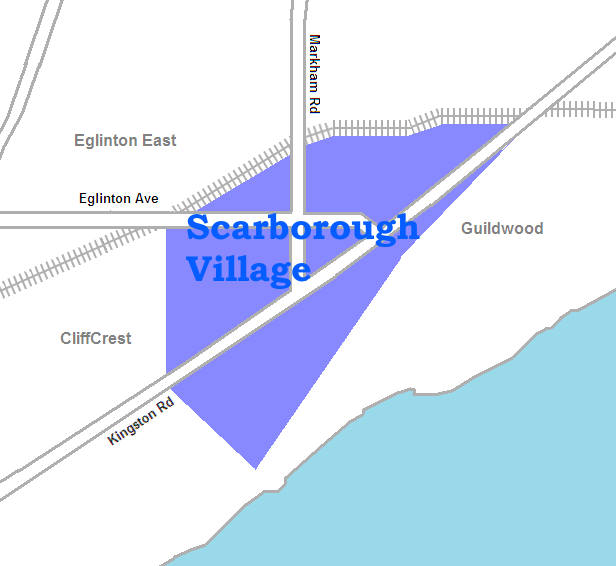
- Coordinates: 43°44′35″N 79°13′08″W
- Country: Canada
- Province: Ontario
- City: Toronto
- Established: 1850 Scarborough Township
- Changed municipality: 1998 Toronto from City of Scarborough

Government
  - MP: Bill Blair (Scarborough Southwest); John McKay (Scarborough-Guildwood)
  - MPP: Doly Begum (Scarborough Southwest); Andrea Hazell (Scarborough—Guildwood)
  - Councillor: Parthi Kandavel (Ward 20 Scarborough Southwest); Paul Ainslie (Ward 24 Scarborough—Guildwood)
- Elevation: 158 m (518 ft)
- Time zone: UTC-5 (EST)
  - Summer (DST): UTC-4 (EDT)
- Area codes: (416) and (647)

Scarborough Village is a neighbourhood in Toronto, Ontario, Canada, located in the larger namesake Scarborough district. It was one of the earliest settlements in the former township of Scarborough with the distinction of being the site of the township's first post office. Despite this, it was not the town centre from where the later (and now defunct) City of Scarborough grew, with mass urbanization of the former municipality actually having begun as spillover growth from the old City of Toronto at Birch Cliff in the district's southwestern extremity. Today, the neighbourhood is composed of private and public housing, apartment complexes, schools, a few condominiums, and strip mall plazas. The neighbourhood lies along the Scarborough Bluffs escarpment.

== History ==
Scarborough Village established as a settlement in the 1800s by Cornell and Secor as a crossroads village. It was centered on Markham Road between Kingston Road to the south and Eglinton Avenue to the north. The area provided settlers with access to the lakeshore and partially served as a through-way for soldiers during the War of 1812. In 1832, it became the first community in the former Township of Scarborough to have its own post office. By 1856, Scarborough Village became a subdivision and by 1860, the area of Scarborough Village had its first completed brick schoolhouse. By the 1890s, a general store, a blacksmith shop, a store that sold farm accessories, and a large railway hotel were built in the area. The area only contained about a dozen dwellings.

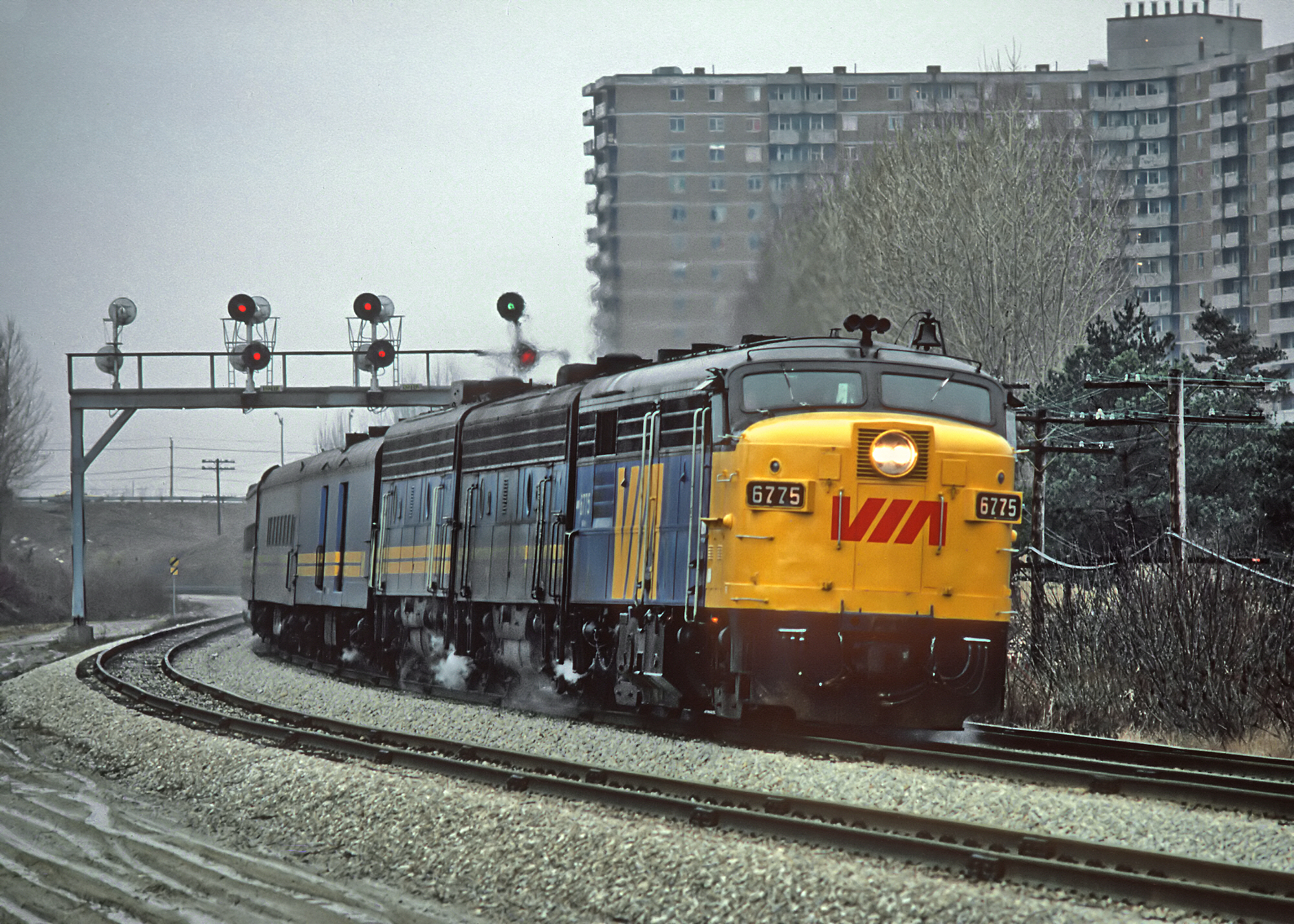
A Via Rail train passing along the rail mainline at the northern boundary of the neighbourhood in 1981. The opening of the rail line in 1930 saw a drop in traffic on Kingston Road.

During the 1930s, Kingston Road had become a major route connecting Toronto with the rest of eastern Ontario communities, as well as Montreal. After the construction of the Grand Trunk Railway tracks north of Eglinton Avenue, Kingston Road had decreased in traffic and a few businesses began to close.

== Demographics ==
At the 2006 Canadian census (0331.01 census tract), approximately 80% of the population was first-generation Canadian, meaning that 80% of the population was born outside of Canada compared to the 9% who were second-generation and 11% who were third-generation. In the 2011 National Household Survey, this number shrank to 68%, while the second-generation percentage increased to 26%. The third-generation percentage shrank to 6%.

== Education ==
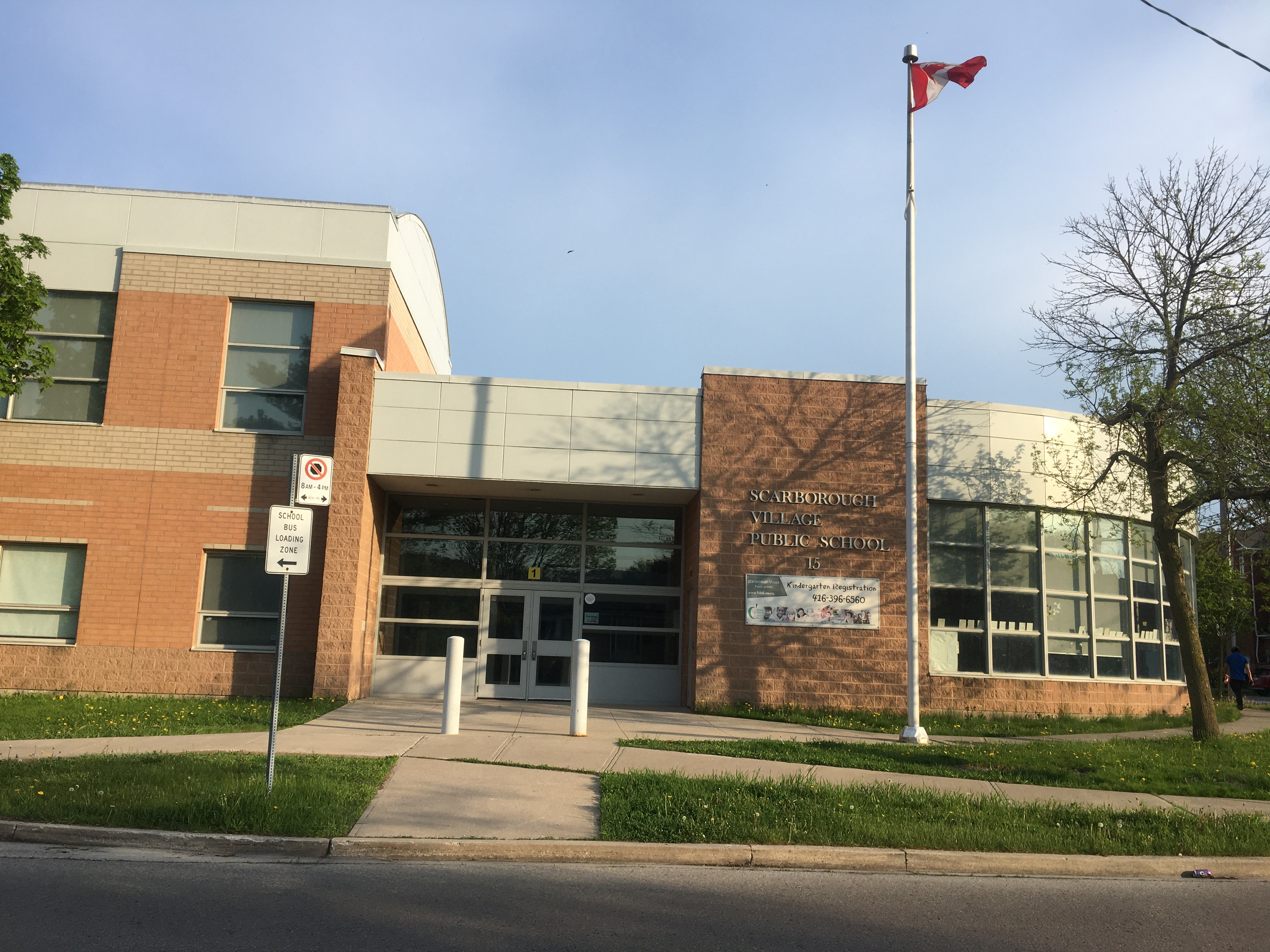
Scarborough Village Public School is a public elementary school located in this neighborhood. It is the oldest school in the area, dating back to 1861.

Two public school boards operate elementary schools in the area, the separate Toronto Catholic District School Board (TCDSB), and the secular Toronto District School Board (TDSB). Public elementary schools in Scarborough village include:

- Cedar Drive Public School
- George P. Mackie Junior Public School
- Mason Road Junior Public School
- Scarborough Village Public School (Formerly School Section no. 9)
- St. Boniface Catholic School

Neither TCDSB nor TDSB operate a secondary school in the neighbourhood, and students reside in Scarborough Village attending secondary schools in adjacent areas. The French-based public secular school board, Conseil scolaire Viamonde, and it Catholic counterpart, Conseil scolaire catholique MonAvenir, also offer schooling to applicable residents of Scarborough Village but do not operate schools in the neighbourhood, with students attending schools situated in other neighbourhoods in Toronto.

== Transportation ==
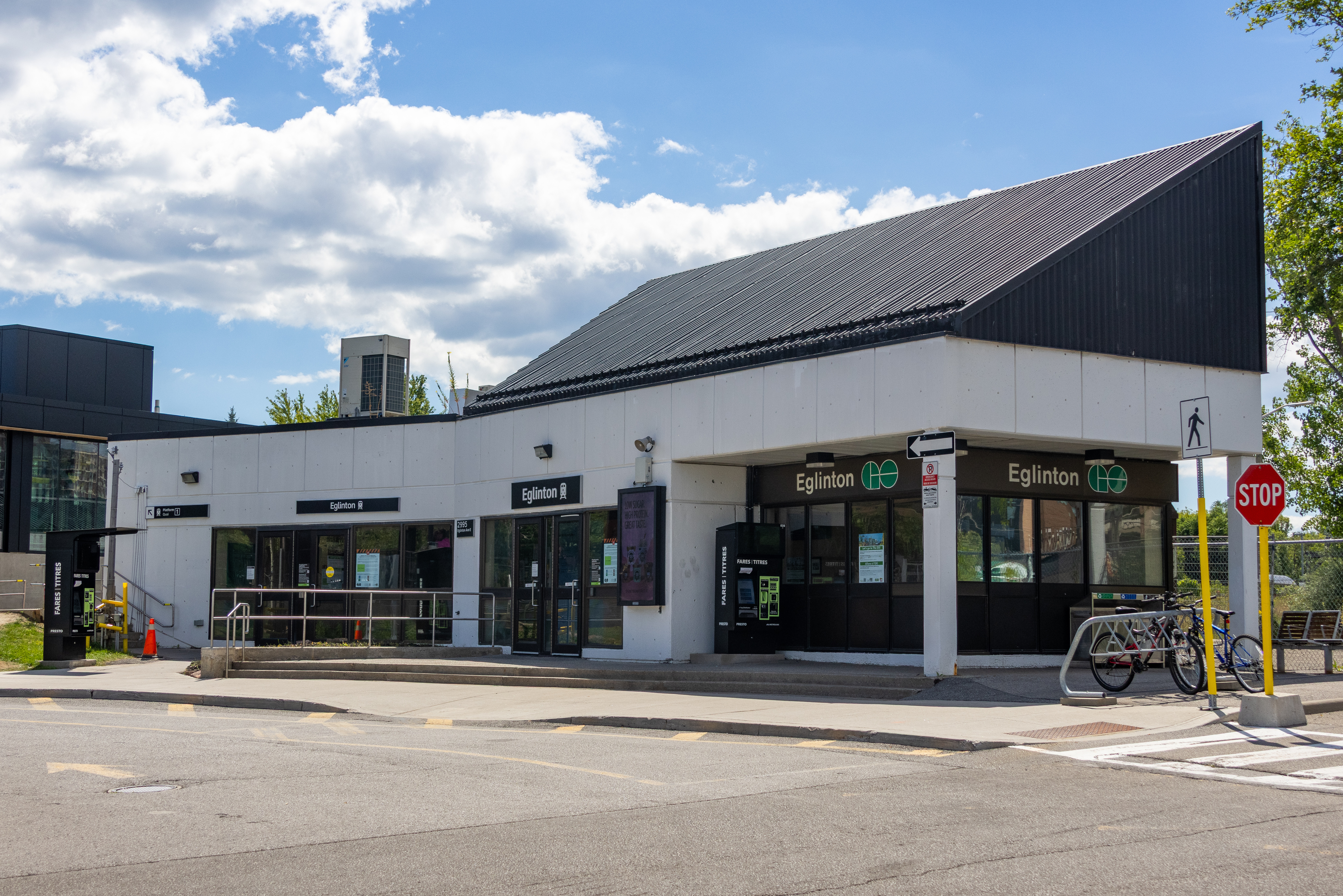
GO Transit's commuter rail line may be accessed at Eglinton GO station, located at the northwestern boundary of the neighbourhood.

The neighbourhood is served by Toronto Transit Commission bus routes 86 Scarborough, 116 Morningside, 905 Eglinton East Express, and 986 Scarborough Express, which connect to Kennedy station, a station for the Toronto subway. Other routes, 102 Markham and 9 Bellamy, connect to Warden station to the south while the latter route connects to the Scarborough Centre station to the north.

Located at the northwestern boundary of Scarborough Village, on Eglinton Avenue is Eglinton GO Station. The station provides access to GO Transit's commuter rail lines to Downtown Toronto, as well as other destinations along its line.

Its southern border, Kingston Road, is a major roadway providing access to south-western Scarborough, East York, Old Toronto and Downtown Toronto in the west and extends to Durham Region in the east.

== Notable places ==
- Markington Square — largest plaza in Scarborough Village
- Christ Church of Scarborough Village — oldest church in Scarborough Village (c. 1846 though rebuilt several times - 1921 after fire at original site in 1918 and relocation in 1937)
- Scarborough Village Community Centre — a branch of the Toronto Parks, Forestry and Recreation Division
- Scarborough Village Theatre — part of the Scarborough Village Community Centre and home to Scarborough music theatre, Scarborough Players, and Scarborough Theatre Guild
- Olde Stone Cottage Pub - Built in 1867 by the Annis family. Now a thriving community "local"

== Notable people ==
- Robert McCowan, for whom McCowan Road is named
- Alexander Muir, the author of the song "The Maple Leaf Forever"
- Conn Smythe, former Toronto Maple Leafs owner, pupil of Scarborough Village P.S.
