= Eglinton GO Station =

Railway station in Toronto, Ontario, Canada

Eglinton
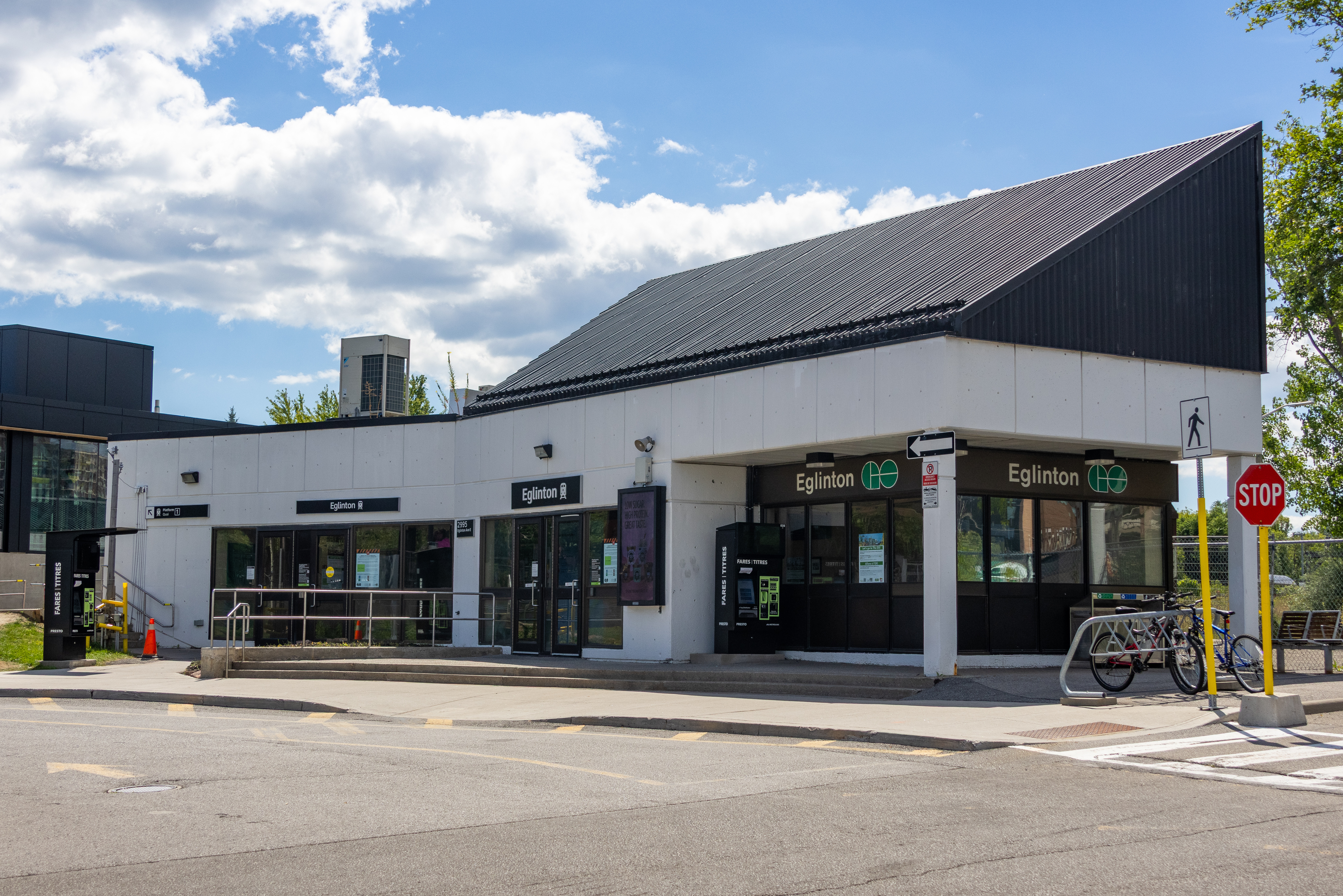

General information
- Location: 2995 Eglinton Avenue East; Scarborough, Ontario; Canada
- Coordinates: 43°44′23″N 79°13′54″W
- Owner: Metrolinx
- Platforms: 2 side platforms
- Tracks: 3
- Connections: TTC buses

Construction
- Structure type: Station building
- Parking: 840 spaces
- Cycle facilities: 6 lockers
- Accessible: Yes (elevated platforms)

Other information
- Station code: GO Transit: EG
- Fare zone: 08

History
- Opened: May 23, 1967; 59 years ago
- Electrified: December 2036; 10 years' time (planned)

Passengers
- 2018: 299,000

Services
Preceding station	GO Transit	Following station
Scarborough towards Union	Lakeshore East	Guildwood towards Oshawa
Future services
Preceding station	GO Transit	Following station
Scarborough towards Union	Lakeshore East (planned expansion)	Guildwood towards Bowmanville
Location

Eglinton GO Station is a train station that serves the Scarborough Village and Eglinton East neighbourhoods of Toronto, Ontario, Canada. It is a station on the Lakeshore East line of the GO Transit rail network.

== History ==
The station opened to the public in 1967. The current station building was built in 1978, and was renovated in 2000.

On September 23, 2021, construction started to make the station accessible. The enhancements would include four new elevators and stairwells linking to the two existing pedestrian tunnels. In 2024, construction was completed and the station was marked accessible.

== Connecting transit ==
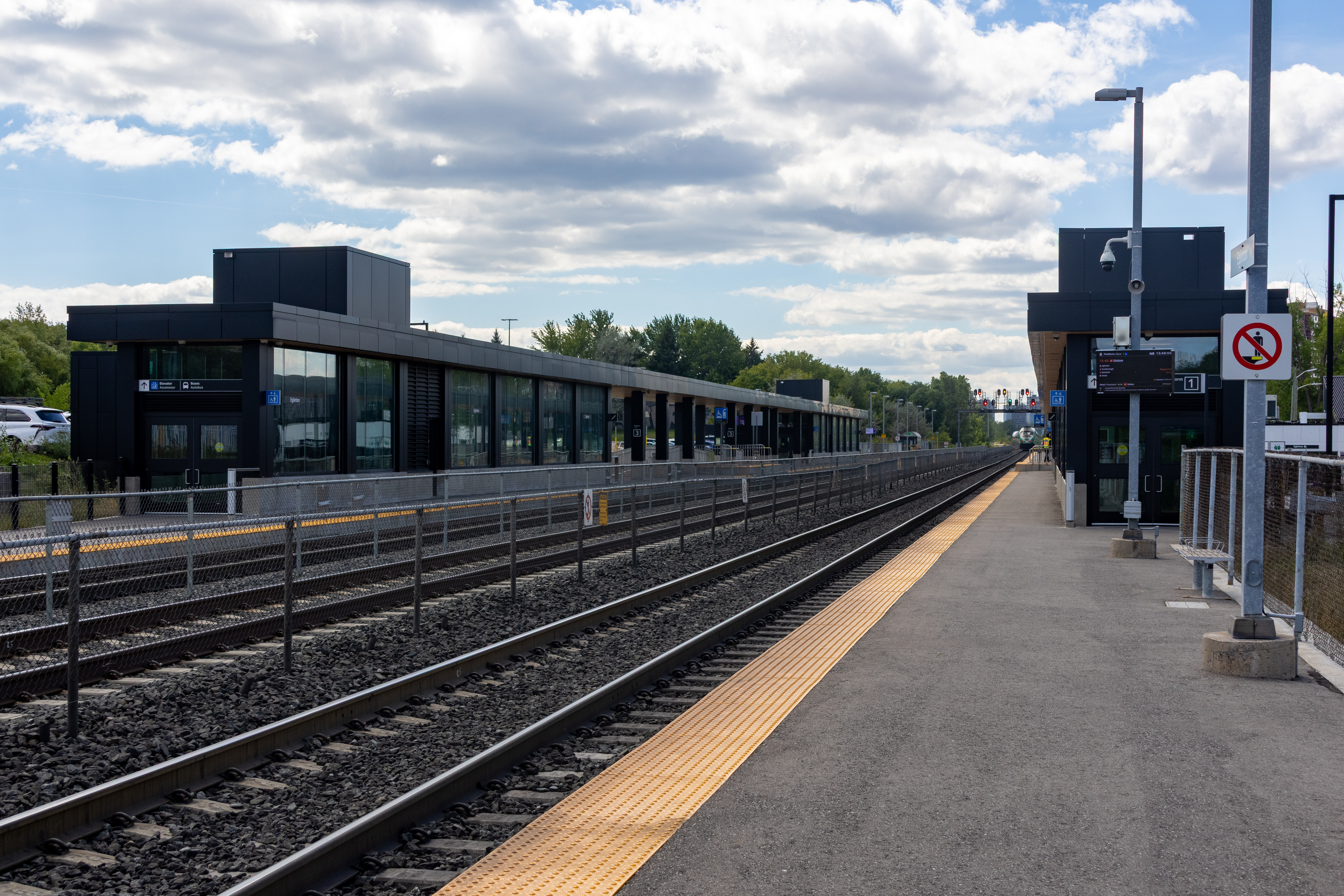
Station platforms in 2025

Toronto Transit Commission buses can be boarded on Eglinton Avenue East at the intersection with Bellamy Road North.

- 9 Bellamy
- 86 Scarborough
- 116 Morningside
- 905 Eglinton East Express

the future Eglinton East LRT will serve Eglinton GO as well as Kennedy and Guildwood GO.
