= Guildwood GO Station =

Railway station in Toronto, Ontario, Canada

Guildwood
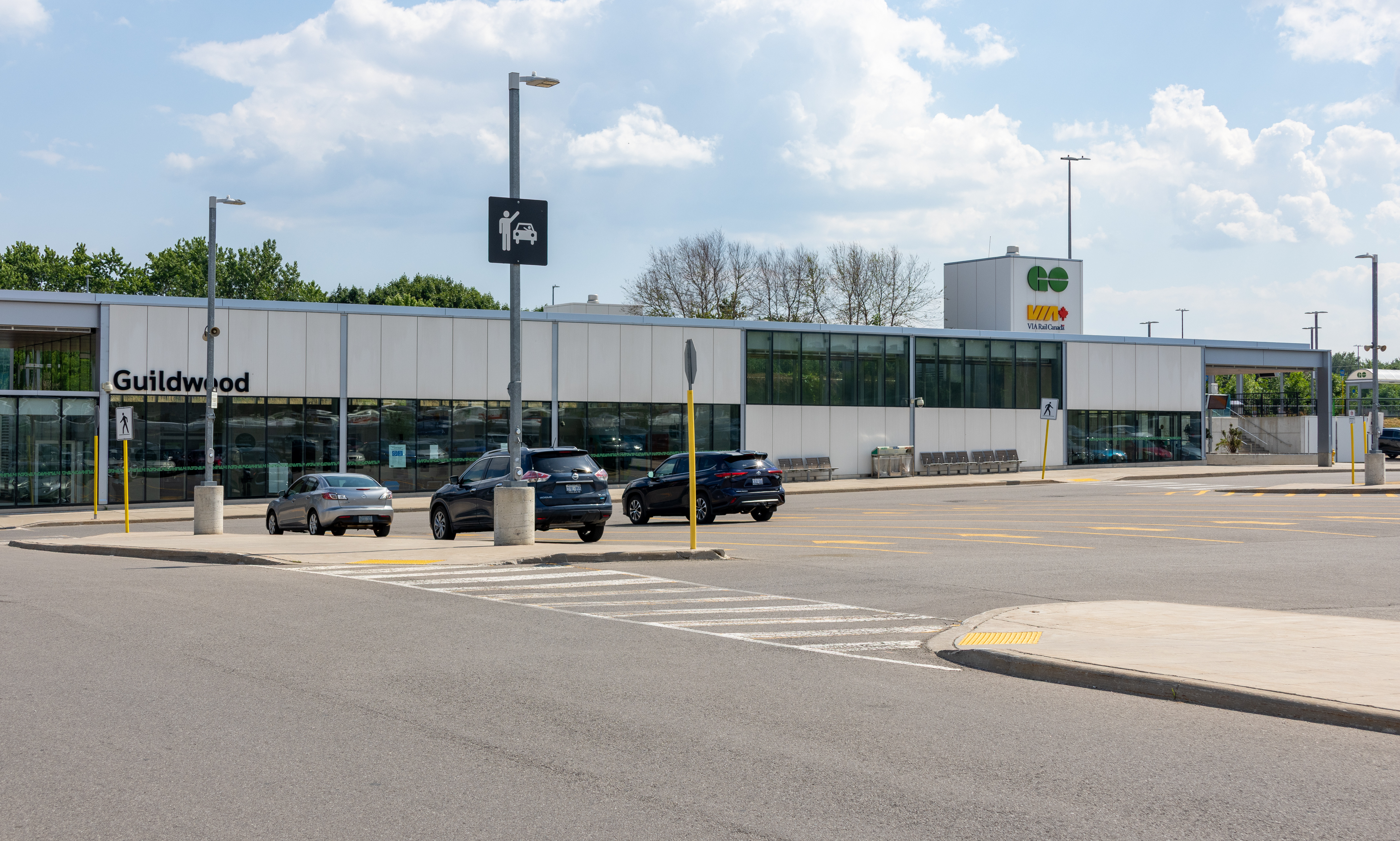

General information
- Location: 4105 Kingston Road; Scarborough, Ontario; Canada
- Coordinates: 43°45′18″N 79°11′54″W
- Owner: Metrolinx
- Line: Quebec City-Windsor Corridor
- Platforms: 1 side platform, 1 island platform
- Tracks: 3
- Connections: TTC buses

Construction
- Structure type: unstaffed station; tunnels and elevators to all tracks
- Platform levels: 1
- Parking: 1,348 spaces
- Cycle facilities: 6 bicycle lockers, city managed bike parking, free bike racks, Bixi rentals
- Accessible: Yes

Other information
- Station code: Via Rail: GUIL; GO Transit: GU
- Fare zone: 08

History
- Opened: April 30, 1967 (CN intercity trains); May 23, 1967 (GO Transit commuter trains)
- Electrified: December 2036; 10 years' time (Lakeshore East; planned)

Passengers
- 2018: 242,000 (GO Transit)

Services
Preceding station	Via Rail	Following station
Toronto Terminus	Toronto–Ottawa	Oshawa toward Ottawa
Toronto Terminus	Toronto–Montreal	Oshawa toward Montreal
Preceding station	GO Transit	Following station
Eglinton towards Union	Lakeshore East	Rouge Hill towards Oshawa
Future services
Preceding station	GO Transit	Following station
Eglinton towards Union	Lakeshore East (planned expansion)	Rouge Hill towards Bowmanville
Location

Guildwood GO Station is a GO Transit train station in Toronto, Ontario, Canada. It is located on Kingston Road in the Guildwood neighbourhood of the district of Scarborough. The station is situated on the CN Kingston Subdivision and is served by the Lakeshore East line. It is also served by intercity Via Rail Corridor trains between Toronto and Ottawa and Montreal. In September 2026, Via Rail announced that it would stop serving Guildwood, but reversed the decision nine days later following opposition from residents and local politicians.

== History ==
The station was opened on April 30, 1967, by the Canadian National Railway, with GO Transit service beginning the following month. Intercity passenger services were subsequently transferred to Via Rail. The station is located east of the Grand Trunk Railway's Markham Road crossing north of Eglinton Avenue.

The station was meant to provide an easy connection to Toronto Transit Commission buses along Kingston Road, as well as car parking. Since the commuter train service was initially only a demonstration, the land close to the overpass and the bus stop could not be acquired due to the cost. This resulted in a relatively long walk for passengers transferring between trains and local transit.

Guildwood became Toronto's secondary intercity passenger rail station, allowing Via Rail passengers travelling to and from eastern Ontario and Quebec to board or disembark without travelling to Union Station in downtown Toronto.

In May 2018, both platforms were closed at the west end for construction of additional tunnels and other station improvements. GO trains opened only the five east-end coaches of each train during the work. Construction was completed on July 3, 2019.

=== Proposed discontinuation of Via Rail service ===
On September 16, 2026, Via Rail announced that it would cease serving Guildwood station effective October 25, as part of schedule changes to its Quebec City–Windsor Corridor. Via said eliminating the Guildwood and Malton stops would improve travel times, citing their proximity to Union Station and connections to GO Transit and other transit services. The changes drew criticism from riders and municipal politicians, including Toronto deputy mayor and Scarborough councillor Paul Ainslie, who called on Via to reverse the decision.

On September 25, Via announced that Guildwood would continue to be served under its winter schedule while the company consulted community leaders and assessed feedback. Four Scarborough MPs—Salma Zahid, Doly Begum, Michael Coteau and Jean Yip—said that the change amounted to only a partial restoration of service, with approximately 28 of the 100 Guildwood stops that had been scheduled for elimination being retained, and called for full service to be restored.

== Connecting transit ==
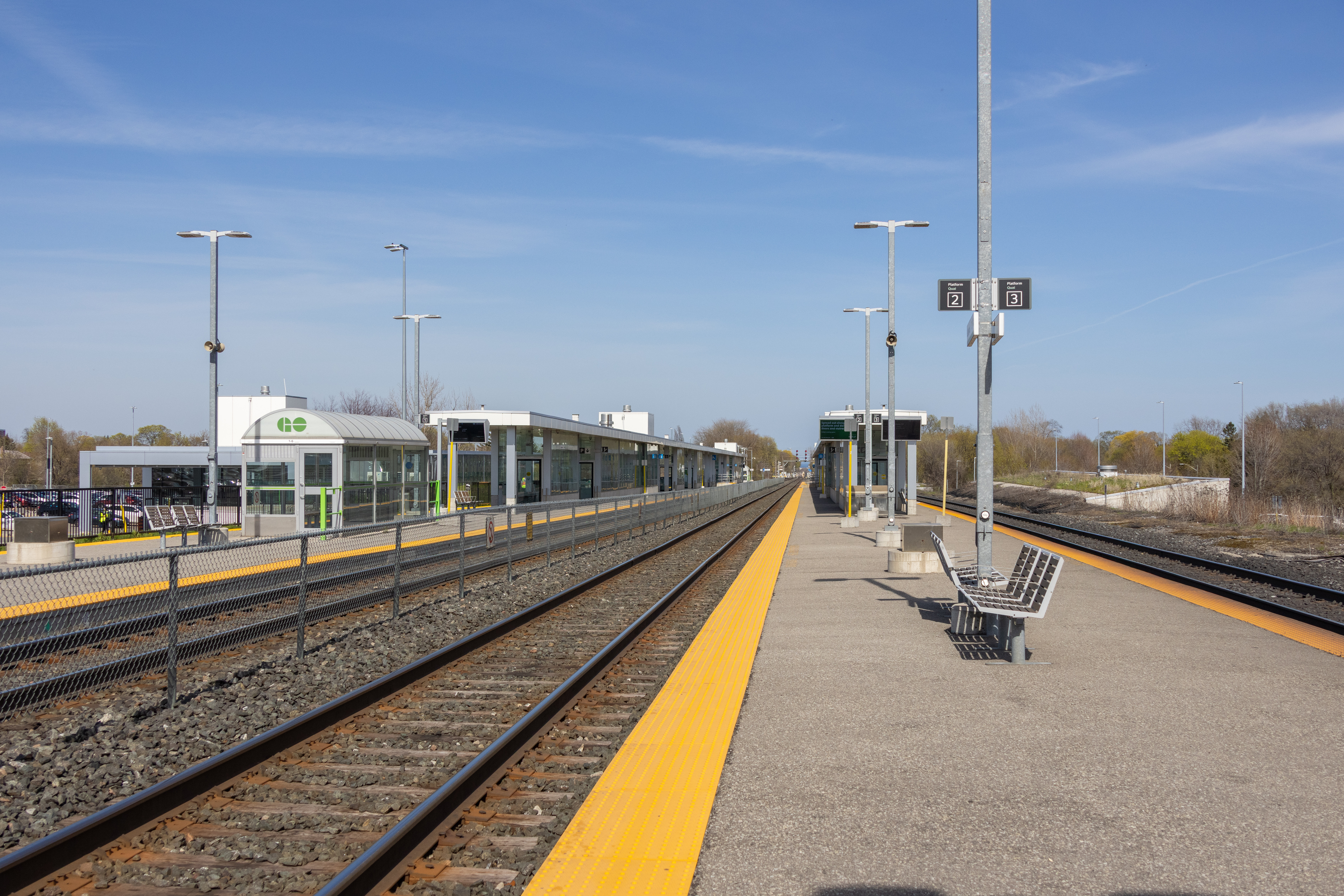
Station platform in 2026

Bus route 86 Scarborough and all of its branch routes, operated by the Toronto Transit Commission (TTC), stop on Kingston Road and Celeste Drive, the intersection closest to the station, about 225 metres from the platform. The route operates between Kennedy station on Line 2 Bloor-Danforth and the Toronto Zoo. The station is also served by the 12D Kingston Road bus, a local bus route that operates during rush hours between Victoria Park station on Line 2 and the University of Toronto Scarborough; the 905 Eglinton East Express, an express bus route that terminates at the University of Toronto Scarborough; and the 986 Scarborough Express, an express bus route that terminates at the Meadowvale Loop. On Tuesdays through Thursdays during midday hours, the station is also served by route 406 Scarborough-Guildwood community bus, operating northbound to Scarborough Centre station.
