= University of Toronto Scarborough bus terminal =

Bus terminal in Toronto, Ontario, Canada

University of Toronto Scarborough
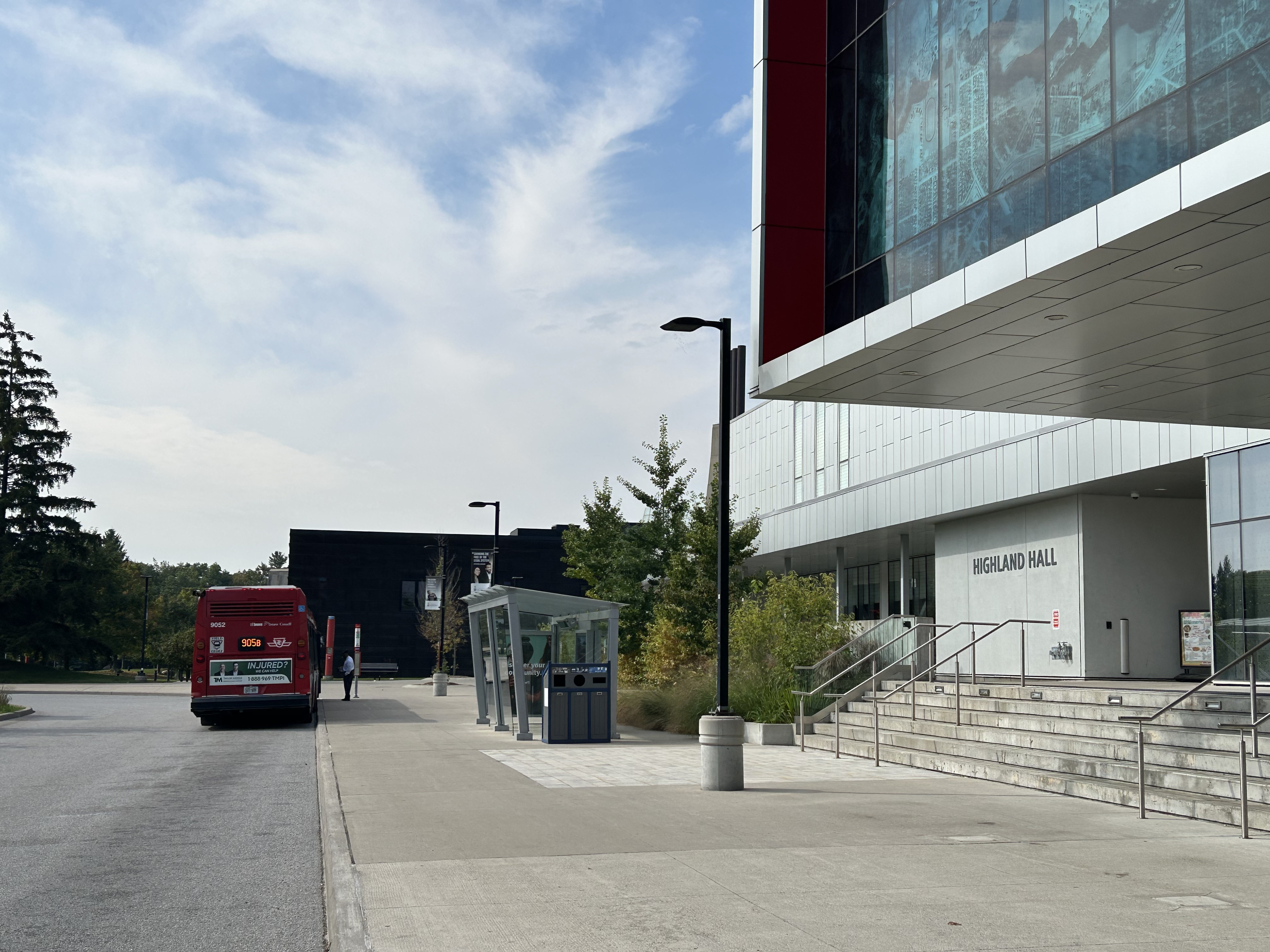
- A TTC bus at the UTSC bus terminal

General information
- Location: University of Toronto Scarborough; Toronto, Ontario; Canada
- Coordinates: 43°47′04″N 79°11′07″W
- Bus routes: 9
- Bus operators: GO Transit; Toronto Transit Commission
- Connections: Durham Region Transit

Construction
- Structure type: Bus shelters
- Cycle facilities: 16 docks
- Accessible: Yes

Other information
- Station code: GO Transit: 00144; TTC: 15114

History
- Opened: 2013; 13 years ago
Location

University of Toronto Scarborough is a GO Transit and Toronto Transit Commission (TTC) bus terminal serving the campus of the same name in Toronto, Ontario, Canada. Opened in 2013, it is located in a loop on the southern portion of the campus adjacent to Highland Hall.

After Durham Region Transit (DRT) started service to the university, Centennial Circle opened as a terminus at the northern portion of the campus, adjacent to Centennial College.

== Routes served ==
=== GO Transit ===
Route		Destination	Availability
41	Hamilton/Pickering	To Hamilton GO Centre (westbound); To Pickering GO (eastbound) via Scarborough Centre Bus Terminal and Richmond Hill Centre Terminal	Mon–Fri
41A	Hamilton/Pickering	To Square One (westbound); To Pickering GO (eastbound)	Mon–Fri
41F	Hamilton/Pickering	To Square One (westbound)	Mon–Fri

=== Toronto Transit Commission ===
Route		Destination	Availability
38B	Highland Creek	To Kennedy station (westbound) via Scarborough Centre Station	All week
95B	York Mills	To York Mills station (westbound)	All week
154	Curran Hall	To Kennedy station (westbound)	All week
905	Eglinton East Express	To Kennedy station (westbound); To Conlins (eastbound) (905A only)	All week
938	Highland Creek Express	To Kennedy station (westbound) via Scarborough Centre Station	Mon–Fri
995	York Mills Express	To York Mills station (westbound)	Mon–Fri

=== Durham Region Transit ===
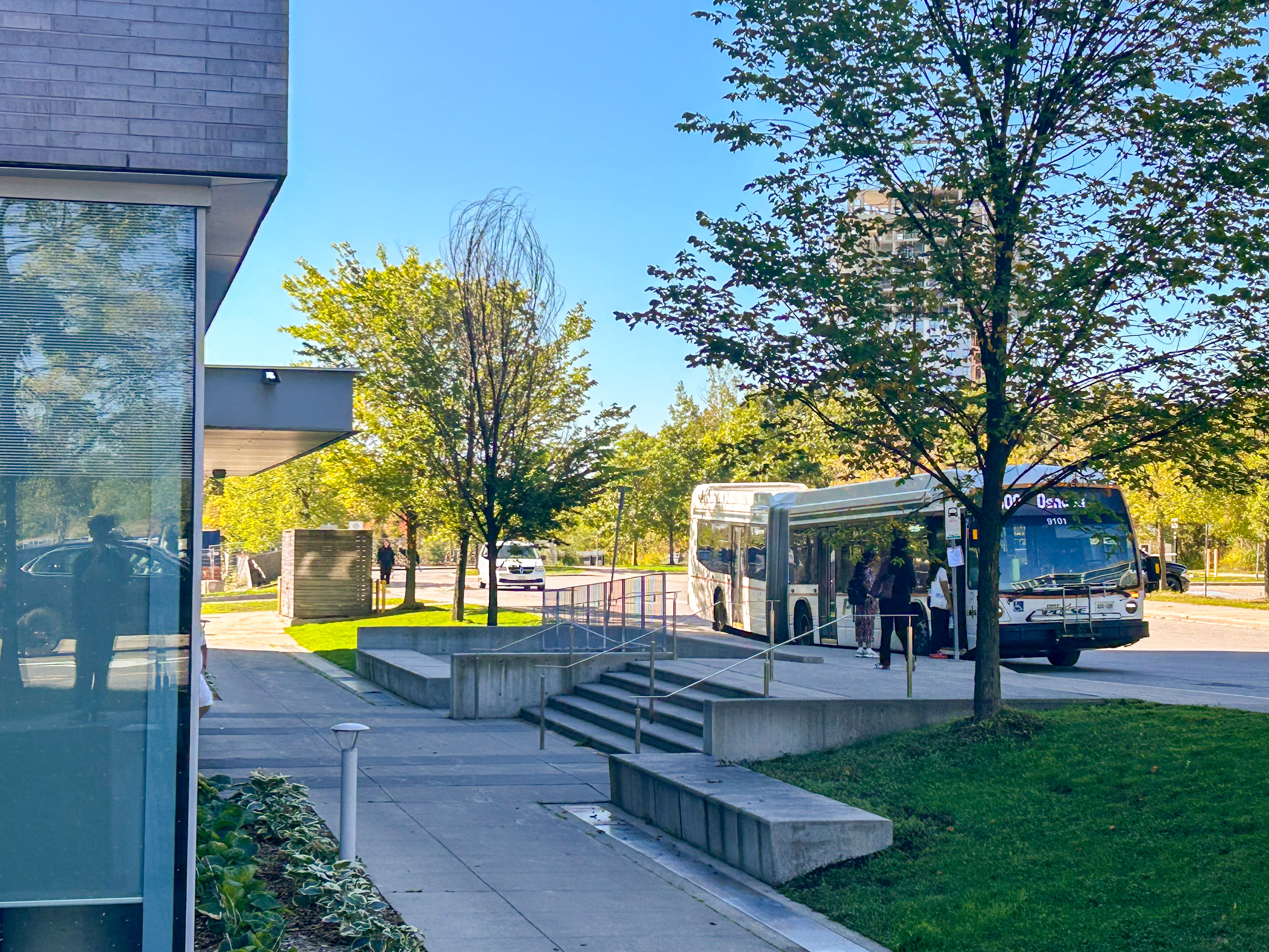
The bus terminal for Durham Region Transit at Centennial Circle

Route		Destination	Availability
900	Oshawa Pickering Express	To Ritson Northbound at Richmond (eastbound)	All-week
N1	Harmony Pickering Express	To Harmony Northbound at Conlin (eastbound)	All-week (night service only)

== Bike Share Toronto ==
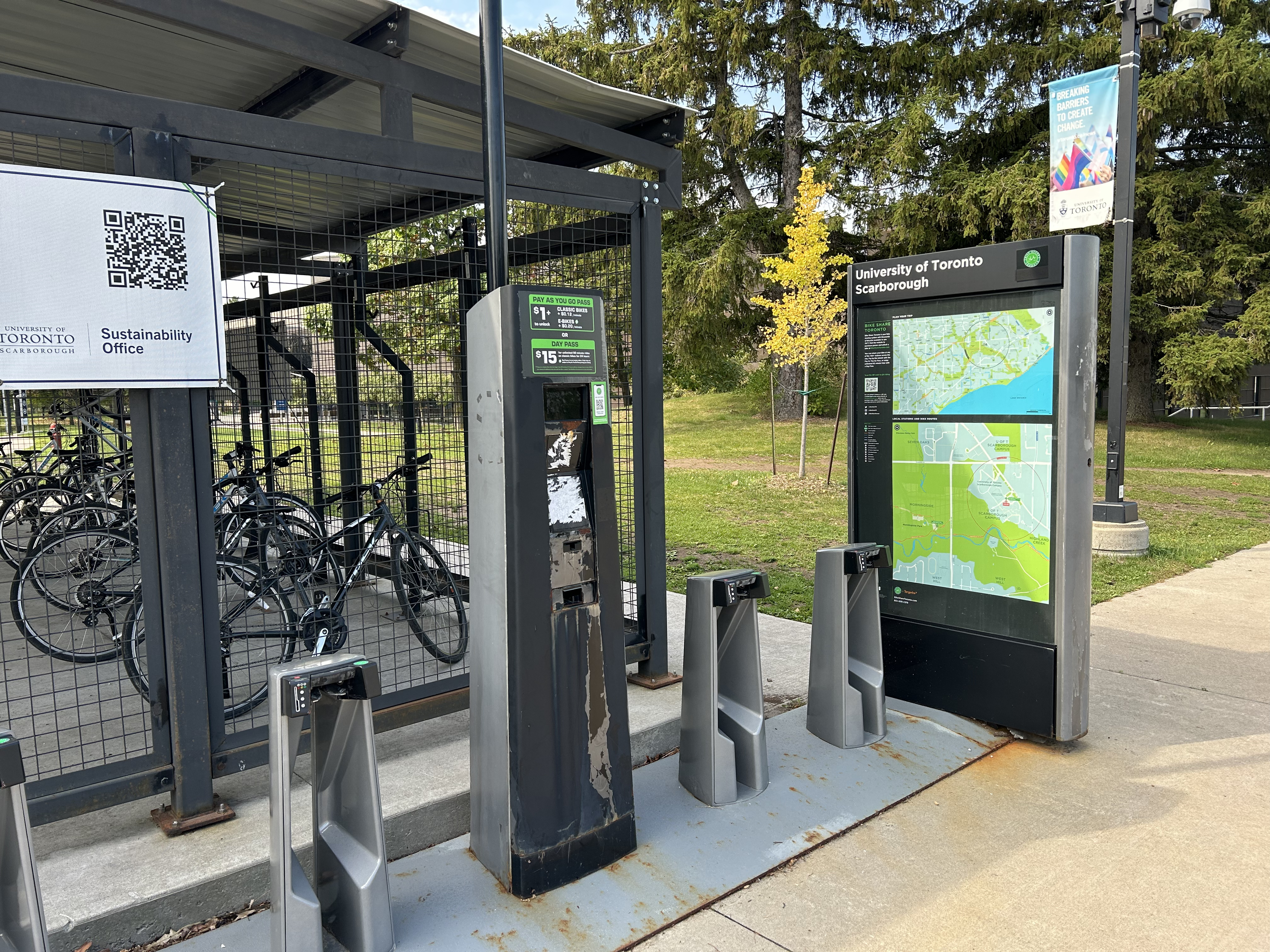
Bike Share Toronto docking station

Bike Share Toronto operates a docking station on the University of Toronto Scarborough campus, located near Parking Lot A and Highland Hall bus loop. The service provides students, staff, and visitors access to the citywide bike share system, with both standard bicycles and e-bikes available.

== Future ==
In 2016 during the planning stages for the Scarborough Subway Extension of Line 2 Bloor–Danforth, part of the plan was changed and redeveloped into a proposed 12-kilometre eastern extension of Line 5 Eglinton that would have a terminus at the University of Toronto Scarborough. This concept evolved into the Eglinton East LRT, a proposed light rail line to replace the Line 5 extension and connect to the campus from Kennedy station.

As of 2025, the Eglinton East LRT remains in the proposed stage, with the University of Toronto Scarborough considered as a stop.
