= Thornton's Corners East GO Station =

Planned railway station in Oshawa, Ontario, Canada

Thornton's Corners East

General information
- Location: Fox Street; Oshawa, Ontario; Canada
- Coordinates: 43.8798°N 78.8837°W
- Owner: Metrolinx
- Tracks: 1

Construction
- Accessible: Yes

History
- Opening: TBD

Services
Preceding station	GO Transit	Following station
Oshawa towards Union	Lakeshore East (planned expansion)	Ritson Road towards Bowmanville
Location

Thornton's Corners East GO Station is a planned GO Transit train station to be built by Metrolinx in the community of Oshawa, Ontario, as part of the approved expansion of train service on the Lakeshore East line to Bowmanville. The station would be located along a new single-track spur line connecting the CN rail corridor east of Oshawa GO Station to CP Rail's Belleville Subdivision farther north. The station would be on the west side of Fox Street north of Laval Drive.

In 2011, Metrolinx had named this station "Thornton's Corners" when its planned location was to have been west of CP Rail's GM spur; by 2023, the name had been changed to "Thornton's Corners East" as the station's planned location shifted to the east of the GM spur. (The GM spur is a north–south track used by CP Rail to access a GM plant south of the CN rail corridor.)

== History ==
In 2011, Metrolinx proposed building the station at the northwest corner of the intersection of Thornton Road and Stellar Drive along a new spur line would have connected the CN rail line west of Oshawa GO Station to the CP Rail freight line north of the highway. By 2021, Metrolinx changed the location of the new spur to be east of Oshawa GO. Since the branch from the CN line to the new spur line was shifted east of Oshawa GO, the station location at Thornton Road and Stellar Drive was no longer possible as the spur line would bypass that site.
