= Metrolinx mobility hubs =

Transit terminals in Ontario, Canada

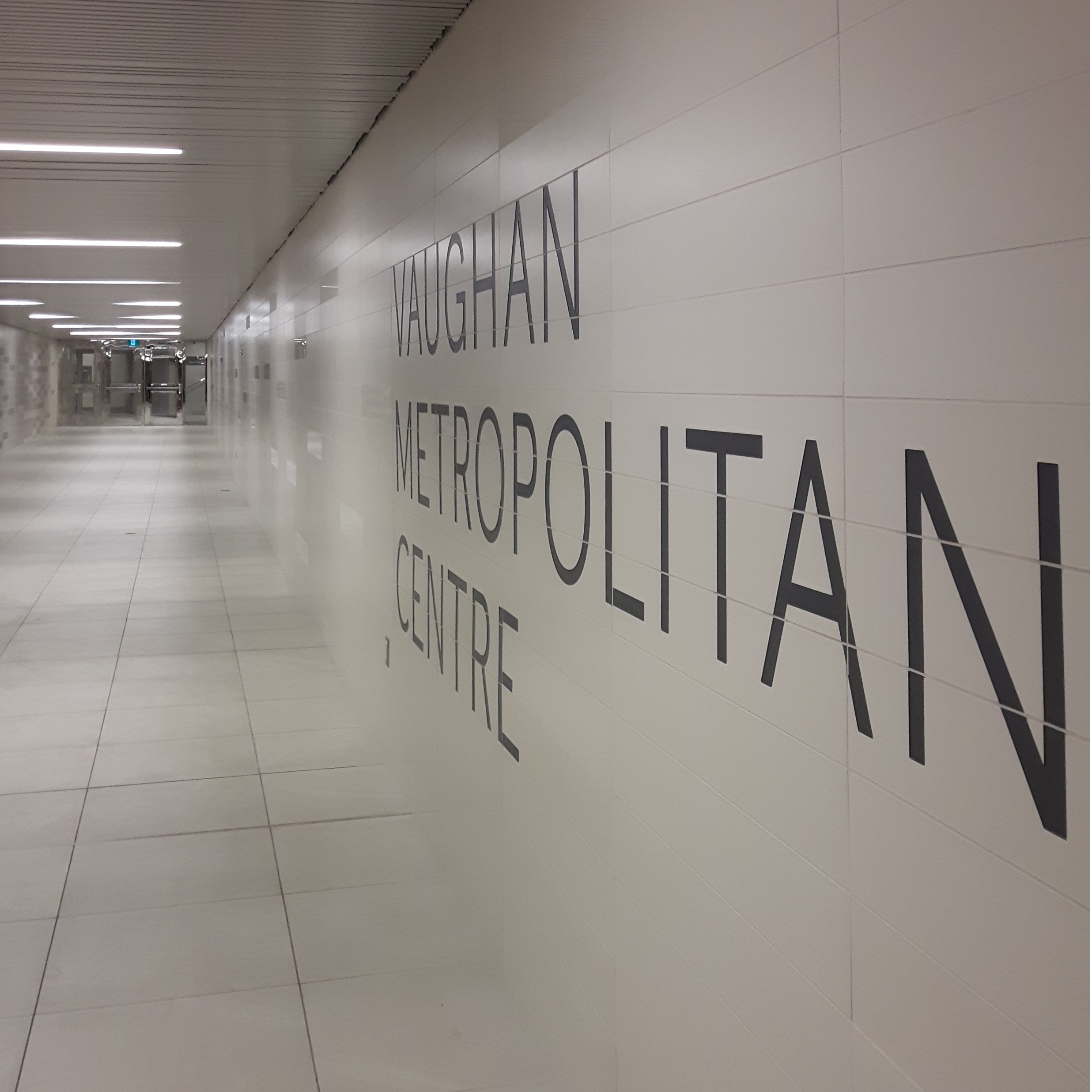
Vaughan Metropolitan Centre station is a mobility hub in the Greater Toronto and Hamilton Area, connected by GO Transit, Toronto subway, and York Regional Transit.

Metrolinx mobility hubs are locations with significant levels of planned transit service in the Canadian province of Ontario, as identified by the regional planning transportation agency Metrolinx under The Big Move. A mobility hub consists of a major transit station and the immediate surrounding area, where different forms of transportation come together, serving as the origin, destination or transfer point for a significant amount of trips. They are also concentrated points of employment, housing, and recreation, making them places of significant economic development and activity where office buildings, hospitals, educational institutions, government service and information centres, shopping malls and restaurants can be located.

== Mobility hubs in the GTHA ==
There are 51 mobility hubs in the Greater Toronto and Hamilton Area (GTHA) that have been identified and profiled by Metrolinx within an 800-metre radius around the transit station. Data has been collected to establish:

- Population and population density
- Employment and job density
- Demographics
- Personal income
- Housing
  - Dwelling type and ownership
  - People per household
- Travel behaviour
  - Travel starting and ending at the hub
  - Transportation mode share
- Transportation costs
- Car ownership
- Existing and planned transit service

Of these, Metrolinx has undertaken studies on seven of them that provide a plan for the design and conceptual vision of the mobility hub in the future.

=== Demographics ===
Hub/station	Population						Employment						Households					
Hub/station	Total	Density (Note: People per hectare)	Growth (Note: 2009–2014)	Age range			Jobs	Density (Note: Jobs per hectare)	Income				Growth (Note: 2009–2014)	Tenure		Type (Note: Low-rise = Single family, semi-detached, rowhouse, duplex Mid-rise = <5 storeys High-rise = >5 storeys)		
Hub/station	Total	Density	Growth	0–14	15–64	65+	Jobs	Density	<$30K	$30–70K	>$70K	Average	Growth	Own	Rent	Low-rise	Mid-rise	High-rise
Bloor–Yonge	32,500	162	18%	5%	81%	14%	56,600	281.7	28%	32%	40%	$103,000	20%	32%	68%	3%	9%	88%
Bramalea	800	4	39%	16%	74%	10%	4,700	23.1	10%	46%	44%	$78,000	70%	54%	46%	36%	11%	53%
Hurontario–Steeles	8,400	42	10%	19%	70%	11%	3,100	15.3	25%	39%	35%	$67,000	13%	36%	64%	36%	3%	62%
Brampton Downtown	6,800	34	17%	13%	70%	17%	3,700	18.6	13%	70%	17%	$73,000	28%	40%	60%	39%	13%	49%
Burlington GO	3,600	18	1%	14%	70%	17%	2,500	12.4	19%	43%	38%	$76,000	3%	52%	48%	55%	20%	25%
Cooksville GO	18,400	92	9%	17%	72%	11%	3,400	17.1	27%	39%	34%	$61,000	12%	54%	46%	26%	8%	66%
Don Mills–Sheppard	17,000	85	25%	18%	72%	10%	4,400	22	28%	40%	32%	$64,000	25%	31%	69%	23%	–	76%
Don Mills–Steeles	8,100	40	−3%	13%	69%	18%	2,200	11	27%	28%	45%	$89,000	2%	77%	23%	73%	14%	13%
Downtown Burlington	7,800	52	1%	9%	64%	27%	3,600	18.5	29%	41%	30%	$64,000	3%	35%	65%	22%	13%	65%
Dundas West–Bloor	18,400	92	2%	13%	76%	11%	4,400	21.9	34%	33%	32%	$72,000	4%	38%	62%	25%	38%	37%
Eglinton–Don Mills	9,800	49	8%	20%	71%	10%	9,100	45.3	41%	38%	21%	$57,000	9%	25%	75%	18%	10%	72%
Eglinton–Mount Dennis	7,500	37	−3%	18%	73%	10%	2,900	14.2	41%	38%	21%	$48,000	1%	44%	56%	45%	43%	12%
Eglinton West	17,000	84	3%	15%	73%	12%	3,200	15.7	26%	29%	45%	$115,000	4%	49%	51%	41%	17%	43%
Finch	27,600	137	12%	10%	79%	11%	12,600	62.6	33%	34%	32%	$65,000	16%	62%	38%	12%	5%	83%
Finch West	7,300	36	13%	16%	71%	13%	4,000	19.7	31%	42%	27%	$59,000	16%	56%	44%	30%	10%	59%
Downtown Hamilton	18,100	90	7%	7%	78%	14%	20,500	102.1	55%	34%	11%	$37,000	7%	14%	86%	8%	19%	74%
Hamilton–LIUNA	7,500	37	0%	17%	71%	12%	4,000	20.5	36%	43%	21%	$50,000	3%	51%	49%	66%	16%	18%
Jane–Bloor	10,600	53	6%	18%	69%	13%	2,400	12.1	15%	24%	62%	$148,000	6%	73%	27%	68%	22%	10%
Jane–Eglinton	12,100	60	−2%	18%	70%	13%	1,900	9.7	39%	39%	22%	$49,000	1%	54%	46%	39%	16%	46%
Jane–Finch	16,200	81	5%	23%	66%	10%	2,700	13.7	41%	40%	19%	$46,000	7%	36%	64%	38%	7%	55%
Kennedy	14,700	73	6%	19%	69%	12%	1,700	8.2	37%	40%	23%	$50,000	7%	42%	58%	36%	8%	55%
Kipling	3,800	19	16%	12%	73%	15%	6,200	30.6	18%	32%	50%	$90,000	22%	68%	32%	45%	5%	50%
Leslie–407	1,700	9	11%	9%	78%	13%	13,500	67.0	42%	33%	26%	$51,000	20%	82%	18%	32%	2%	67%
Main–Danforth	17,400	87	4%	16%	75%	9%	3,500	17.2	30%	35%	35%	$71,000	8%	48%	52%	46%	19%	35%
Markham Centre	1,400	7	47%	14%	76%	10%	1,800	9.0	24%	31%	45%	$76,000	61%	67%	33%	50%	–	50%
Milton Downtown	4,200	21	8%	20%	69%	11%	1,800	9.2	5%	21%	74%	$107,000	9%	96%	4%	98%	2%	–
Mississauga City Centre / Square One	7,300	36	45%	13%	75%	12%	18,000	89.5	17%	36%	46%	$78,000	60%	66%	34%	16%	2%	83%
Mohawk–James	6,300	32	2%	13%	67%	21%	1,900	9.7	24%	44%	32%	$60,000	6%	68%	32%	76%	13%	12%
Newmarket Centre	4,700	23	10%	17%	70%	13%	5,800	28.7	22%	36%	42%	$77,000	9%	67%	33%	70%	21%	10%
Newmarket GO	5,100	26	−3%	12%	71%	13%	3,000	14.7	22%	39%	40%	$73,000	1%	60%	40%	57%	29%	14%
North York Centre	23,500	117	10%	9%	77%	14%	26,200	130.5	31%	34%	36%	$68,000	11%	59%	41%	10%	2%	87%
Oakville Midtown	2,400	12	−4%	14%	66%	21%	3,900	19.3	16%	26%	59%	$139,000	−2%	70%	30%	53%	8%	38%
Osgoode	15,000	74	44%	6%	86%	9%	217,000	1082.7	29%	33%	39%	$89,000	53%	40%	60%	2%	14%	84%
Oshawa Downtown GO	5,200	26	−7%	14%	71%	15%	1,200	6.0	39%	41%	20%	$46,000	−3%	50%	50%	60%	23%	17%
Oshawa GO	700	3	8%	18%	73%	9%	1,900	9.4	13%	39%	49%	$78,000	13%	79%	21%	89%	12%	–
Pape	17,800	89	−2%	17%	71%	12%	5,300	26.2	21%	25%	54%	$110,000	0%	65%	35%	65%	30%	6%
Pearson Airport	–	–	–	–	–	–	8,000	40.0	–	–	–	–	–	–	–	–	–	–
Pickering Downtown	4,200	21	10%	16%	68%	16%	4,300	21.3	20%	37%	43%	$72,000	12%	66%	34%	57%	5%	38%
Port Credit GO	7,800	41	10%	12%	72%	16%	1,900	9.9	22%	35%	43%	$95,000	13%	40%	60%	29%	13%	58%
Queen	18,400	91	33%	6%	86%	7%	215,000	1071.7	28%	32%	40%	$93,000	37%	43%	57%	1%	6%	93%
Renforth	1,900	10	3%	14%	72%	13%	7,900	39.5	6%	27%	68%	$105,000	7%	97%	3%	100%	–	–
Richmond Hill–Langstaff Gateway	6,500	32	14%	15%	75%	11%	2,300	11.2	21%	28%	51%	$82,000	20%	84%	16%	48%	–	52%
Scarborough Centre	10,100	50	18%	11%	77%	12%	13,400	66.7	31%	37%	32%	$60,000	20%	68%	32%	14%	1%	85%
Seaton	300	2	47%	18%	73%	9%	60	0.3	7%	20%	73%	$130,000	62%	92%	8%	100%	–	–
Sheppard–Yonge	24,200	120	11%	9%	80%	11%	26,600	132.3	28%	35%	37%	$71,000	10%	62%	38%	12%	8%	80%
St. George	18,600	92	9%	5%	80%	16%	29,600	147.4	29%	29%	42%	$124,000	11%	27%	73%	9%	25%	65%
Steeles	8,400	42	9%	11%	73%	16%	3,800	18.9	27%	33%	40%	$75,000	9%	65%	35%	49%	1%	50%
Union	18,200	93	41%	5%	86%	9%	190,200	972.5	22%	26%	52%	$132,000	44%	47%	53%	97%	3%	–
Vaughan Metro Centre	–	–	–	–	–	–	6,000	29.9	–	–	–	–	–	–	–	–	–	–
Yonge–Eglinton	27,600	137	17%	8%	79%	12%	23,200	115.3	27%	36%	37%	$87,000	19%	29%	71%	13%	16%	71%
York University– Steeles West	1,400	7	33%	10%	87%	2%	6,800	33.9	70%	25%	5%	$26,000	26%	40%	60%	58%	14%	28%
Mobility hub average	10,904	55	–	12%	75%	12%	19,680	99	33%	38%	40%	$90,700	–	46%	54%	29%	13%	58%
GTHA average	–	7.9	–	17%	70%	13%	–	3.8	20%	31%	49%	$97,000	–	69%	31%	–	–	–

=== Mobility ===
Hub	Rapid transit	Travel behaviour (AM)									
Hub	Rapid transit	Start at hub					End at hub				
Hub	Rapid transit	Car	Public transit	Walking	Cycling	Total	Car	Public transit	Walking	Cycling	Total
Bloor–Yonge	utCONTg utCONTgq utTINTt utCONTfq utCONTf	36%	34%	27%	3%	17,130	34%	57%	7%	3%	47,570
Bramalea	CONT2 STRc3 uexCONTgq; STRc1 uexSTRq; INT2+4 uexCONTfq; STRc3 STRc1 CONT4	89%	9%	2%	1%	1,930	97%	2%	1%	0%	3,600
Hurontario–Steeles	uexCONTg uexCONTgq uexKRZ; lINT uexCONTfq uexCONTf	72%	16%	11%	–	4,830	80%	13%	6%	–	4,920
Brampton Downtown	uexCONTg CONT2 STRc3; uexSTR STRc1 uexKSTRaq; uexSTR; INT2+4 uexCONTfq; STRc3 uexSTR; STRc1 CONT4 uexCONTf	83%	10%	6%	–	4,410	83%	10%	6%	–	5,880
Burlington GO	uexCONTg CONTgq uexSTR; INTq CONTfq uexCONTf	85%	6%	7%	1%	3,530	90%	6%	3%	1%	3,620
Downtown Burlington	uexCONTg uexKINTe	81%	7%	7%	4%	2,170	89%	3%	7%	2%	2,800
Cooksville GO	uexCONTg CONTgq; lhSTRa@fq uexSTR; hINTq CONTfq; lhSTRe@gq uexCONTgq uexTINTx uexCONTfq uexCONTf	69%	25%	5%	–	9,270	82%	10%	8%	–	7,180
Don Mills–Sheppard	uexCONTg utCONTgq uexSTR; utENDEeq; lINT-Rq uexSTR; uextENDEaq; lINT-Lq uextCONTfq uexCONTf	51%	37%	11%	1%	7,420	71%	16%	12%	–	5,020
Don Mills–Steeles	uexCONTg uexCONTgq uexTINTx uexCONTfq uexCONTf	70%	24%	6%	–	3,560	85%	8%	6%	–	2,250
Dundas West–Bloor	CONT2 STRc3 utCONTgq utBHFq; STRc1; HUBaq utSTRq; BHF2+4; HUBeq utCONTfq; STRc3 STRc1 CONT4	43%	44%	8%	5%	10,040	59%	24%	11%	5%	4,970
Eglinton–Don Mills	uexCONTg uexSTR; exSTRc2 exCONT3 exSTRc2 uexmKRZ3+1u exSTRc4 uexCONTgq; exSTRc2 uexKRZq3+1u; exSTR3+1 uexKRZt; exlINT; exSTRc4; lKRZo+L; lKRZo+R uexCONTfq exCONT1 uexSTR uexCONTf	58%	30%	11%	–	5,540	72%	16%	12%	–	9,120
Eglinton–Mount Dennis	CONT2 STRc3 uexCONTgq; PORTALl; STRc1 STR2+4; uextINTq uexCONTfq; STRc3; PORTALr STRc1 CONT4	57%	37%	6%	–	3,800	70%	20%	10%	–	4,090
Eglinton West	utCONTg uextCONTgq utTINTxt uextCONTfq utCONTf	54%	39%	6%	1%	7,790	70%	20%	10%	–	4,150
Finch	uextCONTg uexCONTgq lvMKRZo-; utINT utCONTf	55%	37%	8%	–	12,780	68%	28%	3%	1%	13,710
Finch West	utCONTg uexCONTgq uextSTRq; lvMKRZo; utINT uexCONTfq utCONTf	58%	30%	12%	–	4,440	68%	27%	5%	–	5,000
Downtown Hamilton	uexCONTg uexCONTgq uexTINTx uexCONTfq CONTgq; lhSTRa@fq uexSTR; KINTeq; lhBHFq lhSTRe@gq uexCONTf	67%	15%	16%	1%	7,570	74%	16%	9%	1%	20,810
Hamilton–LIUNA	uexCONTg; lhSTRa@f CONTgq STRq; lhBHF; uxINT CONTfq uexCONTf; lhSTRe@g	66%	16%	16%	2%	2,950	76%	16%	7%	–	3,940
Jane–Bloor	uexCONTg utCONTgq uexKSTRe; utINTq utCONTfq	56%	33%	7%	3%	5,190	66%	24%	7%	2%	2,750
Jane–Eglinton	uexCONTg uexCONTgq uexTINTx uexCONTfq uexCONTf	53%	41%	6%	–	4,900	73%	16%	11%	–	2,570
Jane–Finch	uexCONTg uexCONTgq uexTINTx uexCONTfq uexCONTf	53%	33%	13%	–	5,570	69%	14%	16%	–	4,350
Kennedy	CONTg STR uextCONT3 uexCONTgq; PORTALl uextSTRq; STR; utCONT3; uextCONT1; lINT uexCONTfq; PORTALr utCONT1 CONTf	56%	37%	7%	–	6,820	68%	22%	9%	–	4,210
Kipling	uSTRc2 utSTR3+1e; ulCONTf1 uexSTRc2 uexCONT3; uCONT1; lINT; HUBa; STRc2 CONT3; uSTRc4 uexSTRr+1; uexlCONTg@Gq; STRc2 BHF3+1; uexSTRc4; HUBe STRc4 CONT1	70%	25%	4%	1%	5,130	81%	15%	3%	1%	6,610
Leslie–407	uexCONTg uexCONTgq uexTINTx uexCONTfq uexCONTf	82%	15%	–	2%	1,900	96%	3%	–	–	11,560
Main–Danforth	utCONTgq utBHFq utSTRr+1; ulCONTf1 CONTgq BHFq CONTfq	62%	26%	10%	1%	7,860	50%	42%	5%	2%	4,720
Markham Centre	CONTg uexCONTgq uexSTRq; STR; lINT-Rq uexCONTfq uexSTRq; STR; lINT-Lq CONTf	93%	6%	1%	–	1,210	86%	8%	5%	1%	2,990
Milton Downtown	exCONTgq exKSTReq; KSTRaq; uexCONT2; lINT CONTfq; uexSTRc3 uexSTRc1 uexCONT4	83%	9%	8%	–	2,330	82%	8%	9%	1%	2,990
Mississauga City Centre / Square One	uexvCONTg- ud-CONTgq uexdSTR+l-; ud-STRq uxvSTRq; lvINTq ud-STRq; ld-MKRZo; uexdSTR+r-; uexdSTRr-; uexdSTR ud-CONTfq uexdSTRl- uexSTRq- uexdSTR+r-; uexdSTRr-; uexdSTR uexvCONTf-	77%	19%	4%	–	6,670	85%	13%	2%	–	16,190
Mohawk–James	uexCONTg uexCONTgq uexTINTx uexCONTfq uexCONTf	77%	12%	10%	1%	3,900	78%	14%	7%	1%	4,060
Newmarket Centre	uexCONTg uxKINTe; uKINTa; uKINTaq uCONTfq uCONTf	88%	7%	4%	–	2,470	93%	4%	2%	–	5,240
Newmarket GO	CONTg HUBc2 BHF; HUB3 udCONTgq uBHFq; HUB1 mKRZ; HUBc4 udCONTfq CONTf	84%	7%	9%	–	2,940	83%	10%	6%	–	4,370
North York Centre	utCONTg utINT utCONTf	51%	39%	9%	–	15,020	63%	29%	7%	1%	26,100
Oakville Midtown	uexCONTg uexABZg+l uexCONTfq CONTgq uexKSTRe; INTq CONTfq	89%	9%	2%	1%	2,690	94%	4%	1%	–	4,920
Osgoode	utCONTg uextCONTgq utTINTxt uextCONTfq utCONTf	45%	21%	30%	4%	16,010	24%	67%	7%	2%	187,430
Oshawa Downtown GO	uexCONTg exCONTgq uexKSTRe; exINTq exCONTfq	76%	15%	7%	1%	1,770	88%	6%	6%	–	1,770
Oshawa GO	uexCONTg CONTgq uexKSTRaq; KINTeq uexSTRr	94%	4%	1%	2%	440	96%	4%	–	–	1,630
Pape	uexCONTg utCONTgq utSTRq; uexKSTRe; uextCONTg; lINT utCONTfq uextCONTf	47%	36%	12%	5%	8,340	53%	33%	12%	1%	6,650
Pearson Airport	CONTg; lhSTRa@f hSTR; uexSTRc2 uexCONT3 uexKSTRa; uexCONT1; uexKSTRaq; uexKSTRa; hKINTe uexCONTfq; uexSTRc4 uexCONTf	96%	3%	1%	–	740	94%	6%	–	–	3,510
Pickering Downtown	CONTgq uexKSTRa; INTq CONTfq uexSTRl uexCONTfq	84%	13%	3%	–	2,460	93%	5%	2%	–	4,890
Port Credit GO	uexCONTg CONTgq; lhSTRa@fq uexSTR; hINTq CONTfq; lhSTRe@gq uexSTRl uexCONTfq	80%	14%	6%	–	3,250	87%	9%	4%	–	2,790
Queen	utCONTg uextCONTgq utTINTxt uextCONTfq utCONTf	40%	27%	30%	3%	18,510	23%	69%	6%	2%	195,730
Renforth	uexCONTg uexSTRl-; uSTRc2 uexSTRq-; u-STR3+l; uex-ENDEaq; lvINTq uexCONTfq-; uex-STR+r uCONT1 uSTRc4 uexSTR uexCONTf	80%	11%	9%	–	1,390	91%	7%	2%	–	7,190
Richmond Hill– Langstaff Gateway	CONTg uexCONTg+l; uexSTR+l uexKSTReq; uextKINTa-L INT-R uexCONTr+g; uexSTRl; uexSTR uxtKRZ mKRZu; ulCONTf@Fq uexCONTr+g; uexSTRl uextKRZ emKRZu; uexlCONTf@Fq uextCONTf CONT2+g	75%	21%	4%	–	3,930	93%	3%	4%	–	2,360
Scarborough Centre	uexCONTg uexCONTgq; uextKINTa; uexKINTe uexCONTfq uextCONTf	67%	31%	3%	–	5,830	81%	17%	2%	–	11,310
Seaton	uexCONTg uexCONTgq uexTINTx uexCONTfq exCONTgq exKSTReq; uexINT uexCONTf	81%	17%	–	2%	300	100%	–	–	–	40
Sheppard–Yonge	utCONTg utCONTfaq; utINT utCONTfq utCONTf	54%	38%	7%	–	13,390	64%	30%	5%	1%	25,180
St. George	utSTR2; ulCONTg@G utSTRc3 utCONTgq; utSTRc1 utABZq+4; lINT~L utABZq2; lINT~R utCONTfq; utSTRc3 utSTRc1 utSTR+4; ulCONTf@F	47%	31%	16%	6%	9,110	28%	60%	7%	5%	38,790
Steeles	uextCONTg uexCONTgq uextKRZ; exlINT uexCONTfq uextCONTf	58%	32%	10%	–	4,110	69%	21%	9%	–	6,090
Union	utCONTg utSTRl; HUBc2 utSTRq; utKINTa; HUB3 utSTRr CONTgq BHFq; HUB1 umtKRZ; HUBc4 CONTfq utCONTf	40%	23%	33%	3%	16,060	23%	69%	6%	2%	158,380
Vaughan Metro Centre	uCONTgq uxKINTa; utCONT2; uINTq uCONTfq; utSTRc3 utSTRc1; uexSTR utCONT4 uexCONTf	100%	–	–	–	490	93%	6%	–	–	4,390
Yonge–Eglinton	utCONTg uextCONTgq utTINTxt uextCONTfq utCONTf	48%	42%	9%	1%	15,610	45%	45%	8%	1%	23,770
York University– Steeles West	utCONT2 utSTRc3 utSTRc1 uexKSTRaq; utSTR2+4; lINT uexCONTfq; utSTRc3 utCONT4	87%	9%	3%	–	950	39%	59%	1%	–	18,580
