= Ritson Road GO Station =

Planned railway station in Oshawa, Ontario, Canada

Ritson Road

General information
- Location: Front Street; Oshawa, Ontario; Canada
- Coordinates: 43°53′18″N 78°51′13″W
- Owner: Metrolinx
- Tracks: 2
- Connections: Durham Region Transit

Construction
- Parking: 1,228
- Accessible: Yes

History
- Opening: TBD

Services
| Preceding station | GO Transit | Following station |
|---|---|---|
| Thornton's Corners East towards Union | Lakeshore East (planned expansion) | Courtice towards Bowmanville |
Location

Ritson Road GO Station is a planned GO Transit train station to be built by Metrolinx in Oshawa, Ontario, Canada as part of the approved expansion of train service on the Lakeshore East line to Bowmanville. It will be built on the south side of an existing freight rail line owned by Canadian Pacific Railway, on a section of land formerly occupied by Ontario Malleable Iron Company until 1977 and later by Knob Hill Farms (1980 to 2000) at 500 Howard Street in downtown Oshawa.

In 2011, Metrolinx planned to abandon service at its existing Oshawa GO Station once the expansion was completed; thus, at that time, the Ritson Road location would have become the new Oshawa GO Station. However, by 2022, Metrolinx decided to continue to serve the existing Oshawa GO Station and chose the name of Ritson Road for the planned station.

== Description ==
According to a 2011 environmental impact assessment, approximately 1,228 parking spaces would be supplied on opening day, and future parking expansions would be possible. Bike shelters, a bus loop and a kiss-and-ride area would be included. GO Transit planned to work with the City of Oshawa and preserve older façade sections of a building on the station site.

According to a 2023 revised proposal, the Bowmanville extension will be double-tracked between Courtice and Ritson Road GO Stations, and will be located on the south side of, and separate from, CP Rail's Belleville Subdivision. Station facilities will be located on the south side of the GO Transit tracks.

== History ==
By 2011, Metrolinx was planning to convert a building that used to be a Knob Hill Farms grocery store at 500 Howard Street into a GO train station located near Simcoe Street, but the plans to build a station there were scrapped due to environmental concerns and the challenge of reaching a fair purchase price with the property owner. However, Metrolinx was ready to restart negotiations if both sides could come to an agreement on a fair purchase price for the building. Metrolinx ultimately expropriated the site and took possession of it on July 25, 2014, even though the purchase price had not been settled at that time.
