= Courtice GO Station =

Planned railway station in Ontario, Canada

Courtice

General information
- Location: Courtice Road; Clarington, Ontario
- Coordinates: 43°53′00″N 78°46′06″W
- Owner: Metrolinx
- Tracks: 2
- Connections: Durham Region Transit

Construction
- Parking: 1,100
- Accessible: Yes

History
- Opening: TBD

Services
Preceding station	GO Transit	Following station
Ritson Road towards Union	Lakeshore East (planned expansion)	Bowmanville Terminus
Location

Courtice GO Station is a planned GO Transit train station to be built by Metrolinx in the community of Courtice within the municipality of Clarington, Ontario, Canada, as part of the approved expansion of train service on the Lakeshore East line to Bowmanville. It will be situated east of the downtown area of Oshawa and west of Bowmanville, in an area that is anticipated to be developed over the next few years. The station is intended to serve areas east of the station, as there will be close access to Highway 401. According to 2011 environmental impact assessment, the station would have 1,100 parking spaces, a bus loop and a "Kiss and Ride" area.

According to a 2023 revised proposal, the Bowmanville extension will be double-tracked between Courtice and Ritson Road GO stations, and be located on the south side of, and separate from, CP Rail's Belleville Subdivision. Most station facilities will be located on the north side of the CP Rail tracks.

In 2011, Metrolinx had originally planned to name the station as Darlington GO Station. By 2022, Metrolinx had changed the proposed station name to Courtice GO Station.
