= Greater Toronto and Hamilton Area =

Coordinates: 43°40′N 79°25′W

- Conurbation
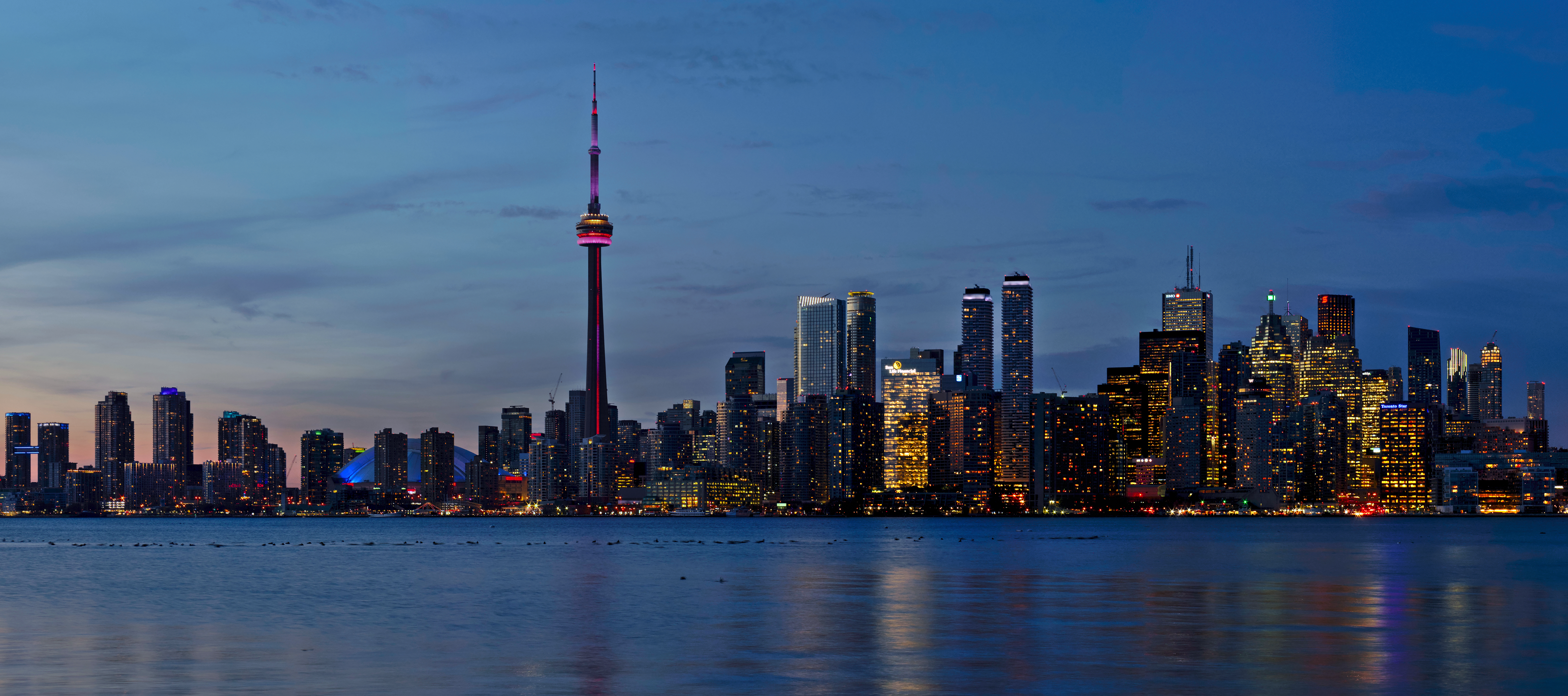
- Downtown Toronto
- Nickname: GTHA
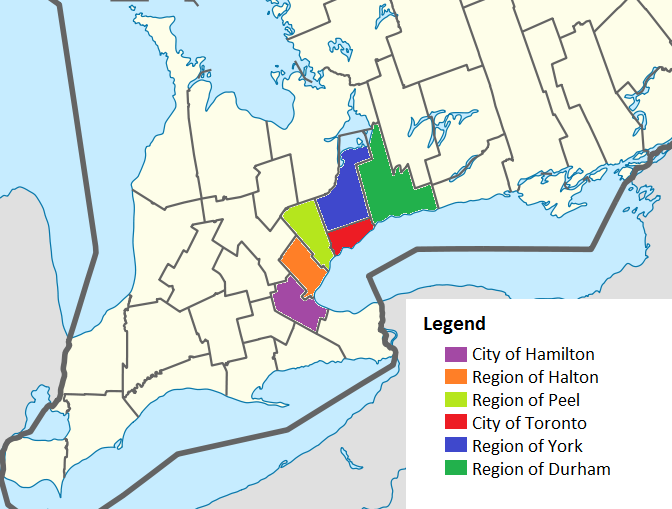
- Country: Canada
- Province: Ontario

Area
  - Total: 8,244.42 km^{2} (3,183.19 sq mi)

Population (2021)
  - Total: 7,281,694
  - Estimate (2024): 8,302,789
  - Density: 1,007.08/km^{2} (2,608.3/sq mi)
- Combined population of the cities of Toronto and Hamilton and the regional municipalities of Halton, Peel, York, and Durham

GDP (nominal, 2022)
  - Total: CA$566.47 billion (US$453.18 billion)
- Time zone: UTC−05:00 (Eastern)
  - Summer (DST): UTC−04:00 (EDT)
- Postal Code: L, M
- Area codes: 226, 519, 548, 416, 437, 647, 249, 705, 905, 289, 365

The Greater Toronto and Hamilton Area (GTHA) is an urban conurbation that is composed of some of the largest cities and metropolitan areas by population in the Canadian province of Ontario. The GTHA consists of the Greater Toronto Area (GTA) and the City of Hamilton. Unlike the Golden Horseshoe, which covers a larger area, the GTHA specifically refers to the urban conurbation of these regions. Despite not being in the conurbation's name, it also includes the City of Oshawa and its sub-metropolitan area. The GTA is Canada's most populous metropolitan area that includes the core City of Toronto and the regional municipalities of Halton, Peel, York, and Durham (which contains Oshawa). The GTHA forms the core of a larger urban agglomeration known as the Golden Horseshoe.

Beginning in the late-2000s, the term "Greater Toronto and Hamilton Area" was introduced by a few public bodies (Note: Adopters include the regional transportation planning body Metrolinx, the Ministry of Energy and Infrastructure and the Regional Municipality of Halton.) to refer to the GTA and the city of Hamilton as a single entity. The population of the combined area was 7,281,694 people as of the 2021 census and was estimated to be 8,302,789 as of 2024. The main series of roadways that connects all the areas together (going from Durham to Hamilton) includes highways 401, 427, 403, and the Queen Elizabeth Way. The GTHA has regional public transport served by GO Transit and local service by multiple agencies, which mostly use the Presto card as fare payment.

== Municipalities and populations ==
Census division	Population (2016)	Population (2021)	Change
Toronto	2,731,571	2,794,356	+2.30%
Hamilton	536,917	569,353	+6.04%
Halton	548,435	596,637	+8.79%
Peel	1,381,739	1,451,022	+5.01%
York	1,109,909	1,173,334	+5.71%
Durham	645,862	696,992	+7.92%
Greater Toronto and Hamilton Area	6,954,433	7,281,694	+4.71%

== See also ==
- Golden Horseshoe
- Great Lakes Megalopolis
- Metrolinx mobility hubs
