= Lakeshore East line =

Commuter rail service in Ontario, Canada

Lakeshore East
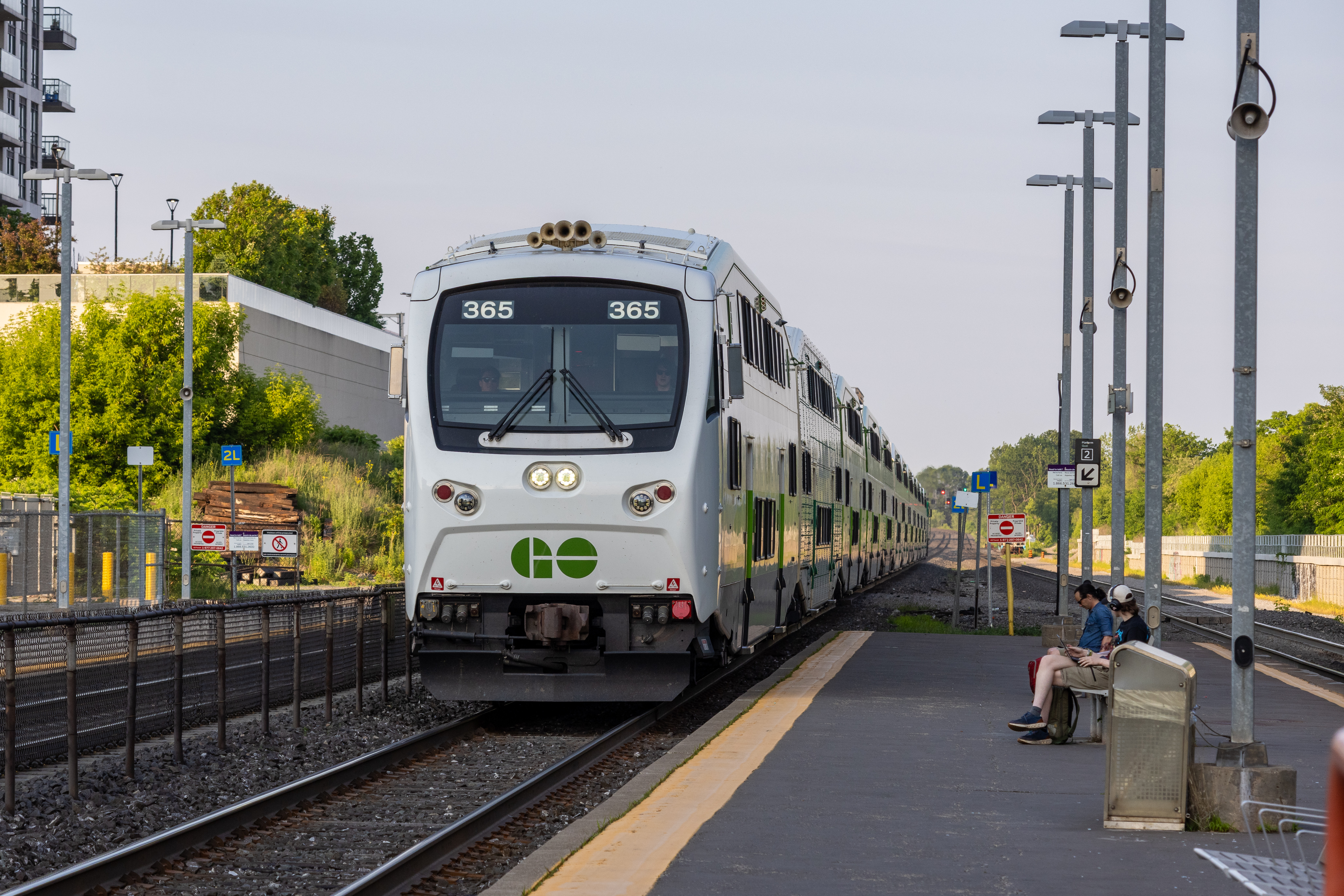
- A GO train arriving at Danforth GO Station

Overview
- Service type: Commuter rail
- System: GO Transit rail services
- Locale: Greater Toronto Area
- First service: May 23, 1967; 59 years ago
- Current operator: Alstom
- Daily ridership: 22,700 (2019)

Route
- Termini: Union; Oshawa
- Stops: 10 (5 under construction)
- Distance travelled: 50.5 km (31.4 mi)

Technical
- Rolling stock: MPI MP40PH-3C, MPI MP54AC, EMD F59PH; Bombardier BiLevel Coach
- Track gauge: 1,435 mm (4 ft 8 1/2 in) standard gauge
- Operating speed: Speed limit: 153 km/h (95 mph); Locomotive max: 150 km/h (93 mph)
- Average length: 10–12 coaches
- Track owner: Metrolinx

The Lakeshore East line is one of the seven passenger rail lines of GO Transit in the Greater Toronto Area, Ontario, Canada. It extends east from Union Station in Toronto to Oshawa GO in Durham Region, along the shore of Lake Ontario. Buses from Oshawa connect to communities further east in Newcastle, Bowmanville and Peterborough.

Most off-peak and some peak trains through run onto the Lakeshore West line, continuing to Aldershot, West Harbour, or Niagara Falls.

== History ==
The Lakeshore East line is the second oldest of GO's services, opening as part of the then-unified Lakeshore line on GO's first day of operations, 23 May 1967. It is ten minutes younger than its twin, the Lakeshore West; although the first train from Pickering bound for Toronto left at 6:00 am that day, a 5:50 am departure from Oakville beat it into the record books.

On December 12, 1975, the Lakeshore East line was the site of the deadliest accident in the history of both the TTC and GO Transit, when a westbound GO train collided with a stalled TTC bus at a level crossing east of Scarborough GO station at St. Clair Ave. East. 9 bus passengers were killed and 20 others injured. The level crossing was later replaced by a railway overpass.

The line initially ran along the Kingston Subdivision of the Canadian National Railway (CN) from Union to Pickering. Just prior to the opening of GO service, CN had moved much of its freight operations from downtown areas to the new MacMillan Yard north of the city. To feed freight traffic from the east into the Yard, CN built the new York Subdivision across the top of the city (in what was then farmland) and connected the Yard to the Kingston Sub just west of Pickering at Pickering Junction. This offloaded the majority of traffic from the Kingston Sub between Pickering Junction and Union, allowing ample scheduling room for GO service. Sections of the Kingston Sub to the east of Pickering Junction remained in use as the mainline to Montreal, and CN did not have capacity to allow GO traffic on these sections.

GO had originally planned to address this as part of a much larger project known as GO-Urban, and later, GO ALRT. GO ALRT would have used a new electric train car running on a dedicated right-of-way between Pickering and its terminus to the east of Harmony Road on the far eastern edge of Oshawa. ALRT was to have followed the CN lines east to Whitby, then across the 401 to follow the Canadian Pacific (CP) Belleville Subdivision, which runs in parallel on the north side of the 401. Stations would be built at Pickering, Ajax, Whitby, Hopkins (west edge of Oshawa), Simcoe (downtown Oshawa), Oshawa east (at Stevenson) and finally Harmony. First proposed in 1982, ALRT lived for only a short time before it was cancelled in 1985 with a change of government.

Instead, the basic alignment planned for ALRT from Pickering to Oshawa was laid using conventional track, splitting off at Pickering Junction and running under the York Sub bridge over the 401 in a complex basket weave. It ran along the original ALRT layout to Whitby, but abandoned the 401 overpass and instead continued along the CN lines to the current Oshawa GO Station on the far western edge of town. The new lines were laid in sections, reaching Oshawa in 1995. Until 29 December 2006, weekend and holiday trains still ended in Pickering, but service is now offered along the entire route every day of the year.

In December 1993, GO Transit initiated a program for the eastward expansion of the Lakeshore East line, for which it received approval in 1994. GO Transit undertook a study to determine whether to use the CN or CP tracks.

Metrolinx purchased the section of CN's Kingston Subdivision between Pickering Junction and Union on 31 March 2011 and now completely owns the Lakeshore East corridor.

On 29 June 2013, off-peak service was improved to every 30 minutes. On 24 September 2018, weekday mid-day service frequency was improved again, now operating every 15 minutes.

As of July 2020, seven level crossings remain on the line.

== Service ==
As of September 2021, local service operates every 15 minutes on weekdays and every 30 minutes on weekends.

Express services have been temporarily suspended to facilitate track construction between Union Station and Danforth.

== Station list ==
Most off-peak trains, as well as some peak trains, continue as part of the Lakeshore West corridor after stopping at Union. With few exceptions, it is possible to travel from Oshawa to Aldershot, West Harbour or Niagara Falls without changing trains in Toronto.

Station	Municipality		Connections	Notes
Bowmanville	Durham	Clarington	TBD	Under construction
Courtice	Durham	Clarington	TBD	Under construction
Ritson Road	Durham	Oshawa	TBD	Under construction
Thornton's Corners East	Durham	Oshawa	TBD	Under construction
Oshawa	Durham	Oshawa	DRT	
Whitby	Durham	Whitby	DRT	
Ajax	Durham	Ajax	DRT	
Pickering	Durham	Pickering	DRT	
Rouge Hill	Toronto		TTC, DRT	
Guildwood	Toronto		TTC	
Eglinton	Toronto		TTC	
Scarborough	Toronto		TTC	
Danforth	Toronto		TTC	
East Harbour	Toronto		TBD	Planned station
Union	Toronto		TTC	Through service to Lakeshore West line

== Expansion ==
=== Bowmanville extension ===
==== Description of extension ====
The Bowmanville Extension is a planned extension of the Lakeshore East line to run from Oshawa GO station to Bowmanville along a new branch line. The extension would be almost 20 kilometres (12 mi) long, and have four new stations: Thornton's Corners East, Ritson Road, Courtice, and Bowmanville.

Running east from Oshawa GO station, the extension would turn north crossing over Highway 401 and a CP Rail spur line on bridges to arrive at the planned Thornton's Corners East GO station in Oshawa. Continuing north, the extension would curve east on the south side CP Rail's Belleville Subdivision, passing the planned Ritson Road and Courtice GO Stations terminating at the planned Bowmanville GO Station. The extension would be mostly single-track with double-track between Ritson Road and Courtice GO Stations; there would two stub tracks at Bowmanville GO Station. Between Oshawa and Bowmanville, GO Transit trains would be operating on its own track independent from freight operations on the CP Belleville division.

Trains on the Bowmanville Extension would operate every hour on weekdays and every two hours on weekends. Weekday peak period service would be every 30 minutes.

==== History of extension ====
In 2008, Metrolinx published its regional transportation entitled The Big Move. As part of this, the agency identified an express all-day service between Hamilton and Oshawa (via Toronto Union) as one of its top 15 priorities. Metrolinx also committed to eventually providing service every 15 minutes on the line, as well as electrifying railways. This project, dubbed Regional Express Rail (now called GO Expansion), was expected to reduce some trip times by 20%. Continued growth of the Oshawa area has led to renewed calls for expansion of the Lakeshore East line, this time all the way to Bowmanville. On June 20, 2016, it was announced that the line would be extended to Bowmanville; at that time, the extension was expected to open in 2024.

Proposed alignment of the railway tracks, which will carry trains on a new bridge over Highway 401.

Part of the Bowmanville extension would be along a new GO Transit spur line connecting the CN rail corridor south of Highway 401 to CP Rail's Belleville Subdivision further north. Metrolinx considered three proposals for this spur. In a 2011 proposal, the spur would have branched off west of Oshawa GO Station, crossed over Highway 401 and Stellar Drive on bridges, turned east passing under Thornton Road and under CP Rail's GM spur servicing a General Motors Canada manufacturing plant. In February 2020, Metrolinx proposed instead that the GO spur branch off east of Oshawa GO Station and utilize the existing GM spur to connect to the CPR corridor. However, in November 2020, CP Rail advised Metrolinx to develop an independent alignment as the GM plant it served at the south end of the GM spur would reopen. Thus, in 2021, Metrolinx proposed a separate alignment east of Oshawa GO to cross Highway 401 on a new bridge parallel to the GM spur bridge, and then cross over that spur on another bridge to run eastwards parallel to CP Rail's Belleville Subdivision. Metrolinx prefers its 2021 proposal.

The expansion project would cost about $730 million and include new signal infrastructure, seven new bridges, and upgrades to at-grade level crossings.

By June 2023, Bowmanville Construction Partners (BCP) was selected as the construction manager to advise on the design and construction management for the Bowmanville Extension. BCP is a partnership between Ledcor CMI Ltd. and Dragados Canada Inc.

Construction began on the extension in January 2026.

=== Corridor expansion ===
The Lakeshore East Rail Corridor Expansion project is to prepare the Lakeshore East line for the addition of a fourth track and for electrification. Construction tasks along the corridor include:

- Widening of the Warden Avenue overpass bridge.
- Widening of the Danforth Avenue overpass bridge.
- Constructing retaining walls along the railway embankment between Wolcott Avenue and Warden Avenue.
- Constructing a retaining wall along the railway embankment between Main Street and Victoria Park Avenue.
- Constructing a retaining wall along the railway embankment in the Small's Creek area.
- Widening the railway embankment between the Don River and Gerrard Street to accommodate four GO train tracks plus two tracks for the planned Ontario Line.
- Building the East Harbour Transit Hub providing four tracks for GO trains plus two tracks for the Ontario Line.

== Rouge River bridge ==
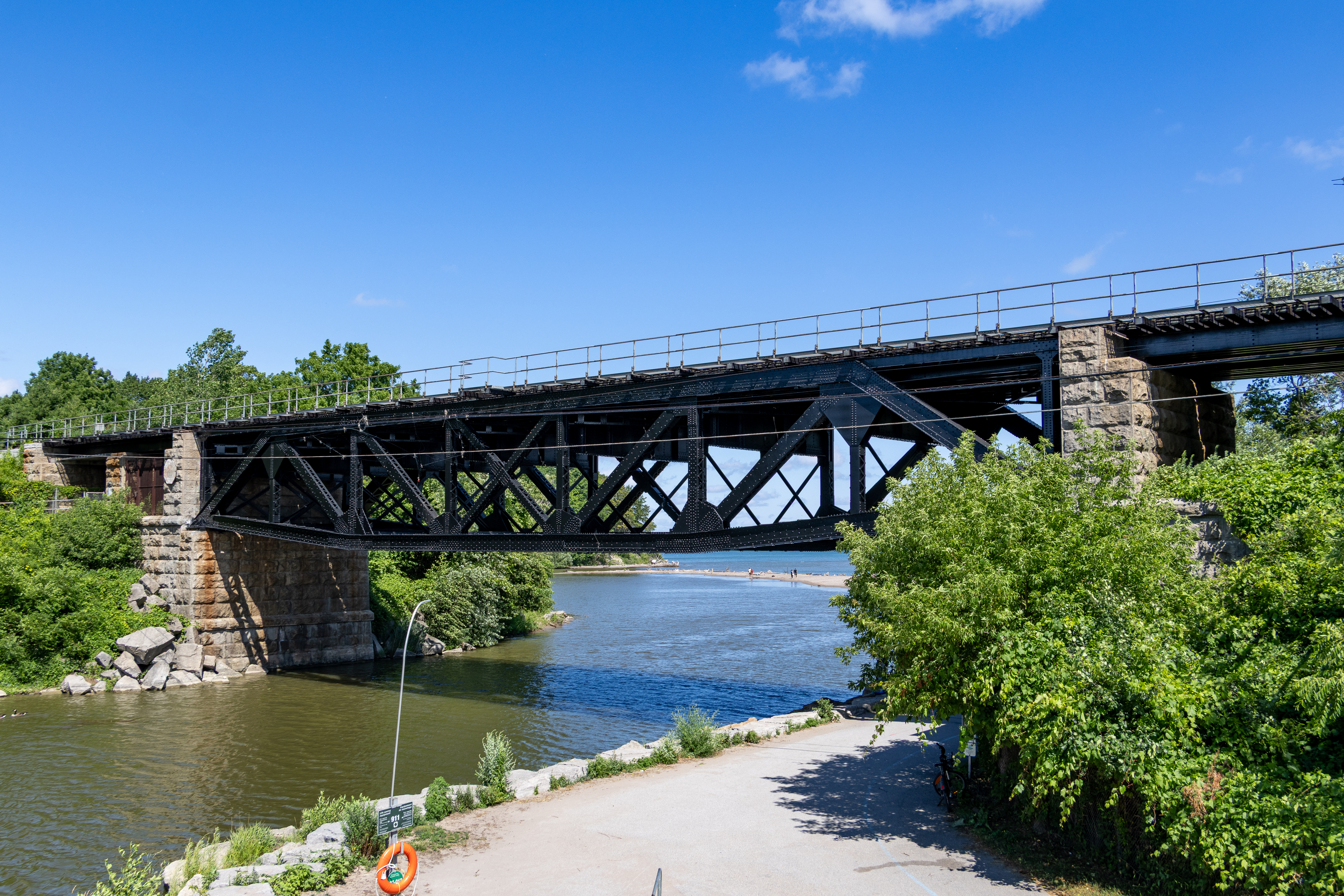
The Rouge River bridge in July 2025

The Rouge River bridge carries GO Transit's Lakeshore East line over the Rouge River at the city limits of both Toronto and Pickering. Constructed about 1905, the bridge is listed as a provincial heritage property. It has two ashlar stone masonry end piers supporting a steel deck truss structure. It is one of only a few bridges of this design in the Greater Toronto Area.

In late 2021, Metrolinx started rehabilitation work to extend the life of the bridge by another 20 years. Because of its heritage status, Metrolinx decided not to replace the bridge. Rehabilitation of the bridge was completed in late 2022.
