= Oshawa GO Station =

Railway station in Oshawa, Ontario, Canada

Oshawa
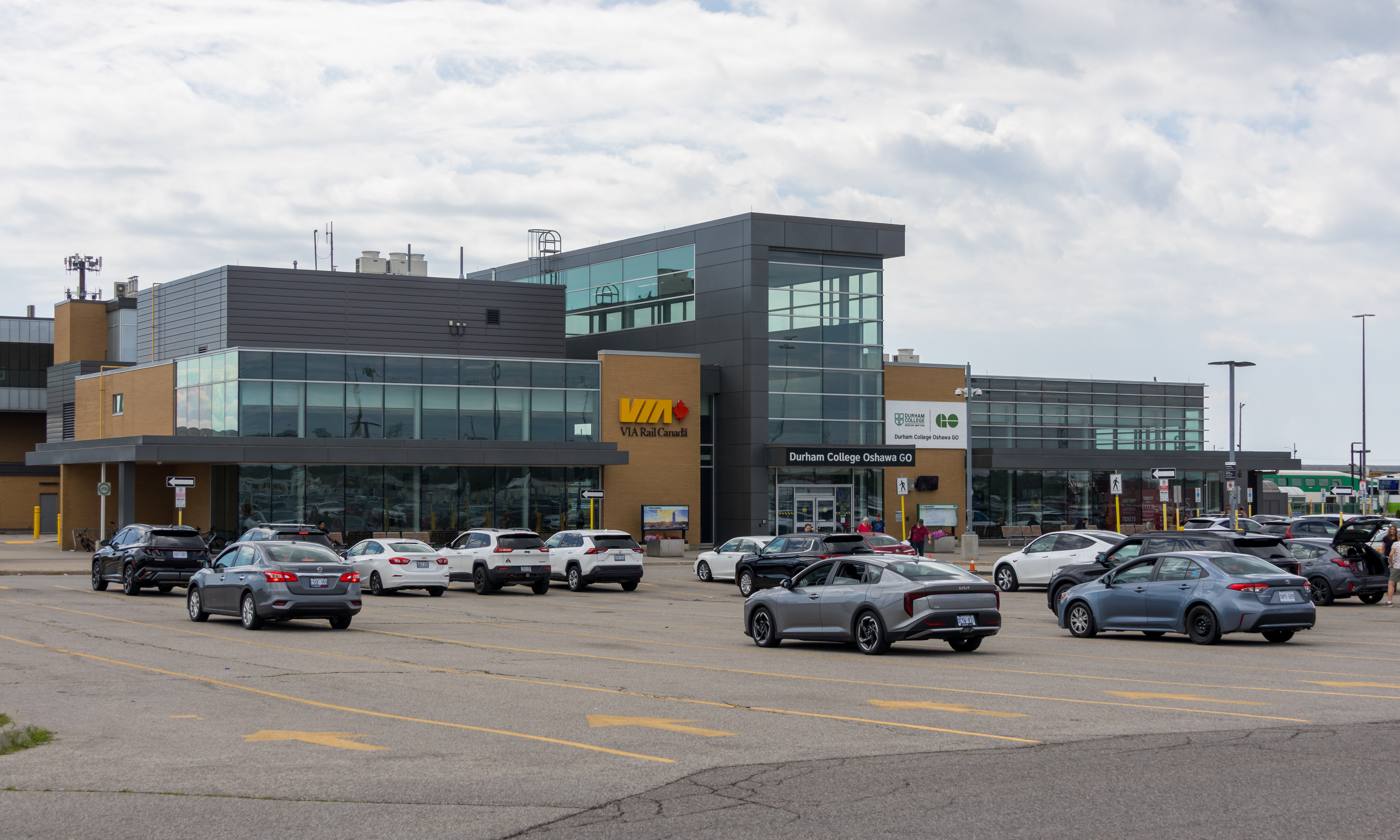

General information
- Other names: Durham College Oshawa GO
- Location: 915 Bloor Street West; Oshawa, Ontario; Canada
- Coordinates: 43°52′14″N 78°53′08″W
- Owner: Via Rail and Metrolinx
- Line: Quebec City–Windsor Corridor
- Platforms: 1 island platform for GO Train; 1 island and 1 side for Via Rail
- Tracks: 5 (2 GO and 3 Via)
- Bus routes: 52 56 88 90 92 96B
- Bus stands: 341 bus bays
- Connections: Durham Region Transit

Construction
- Structure type: Via Rail building with staffed ticket counter, public washrooms and waiting room. GO Transit shelters.
- Parking: 2,260 spaces
- Cycle facilities: Yes
- Accessible: Yes

Other information
- Station code: GO Transit: OS
- Fare zone: 94

History
- Rebuilt: November 24, 2017
- Electrified: December 2036; 10 years' time (Lakeshore East; planned)

Passengers
- Apr–Dec 2019: 971,700 (GO Transit)

Services
Preceding station	Via Rail	Following station
Guildwood toward Toronto	Toronto–Ottawa	Port Hope toward Ottawa
Guildwood toward Toronto	Toronto–Montreal	Cobourg toward Montreal
Preceding station	GO Transit	Following station
Whitby towards Union	Lakeshore East	Terminus
Future services
Preceding station	GO Transit	Following station
Whitby towards Union	Lakeshore East (planned expansion)	Thornton's Corners East towards Bowmanville
Former services
Preceding station	Canadian National Railway	Following station
Whitby toward Sarnia	Grand Trunk Railway; Main Line	Bowmanville toward Montreal
Location
- Location within Southern Ontario Location within Ontario Location within Canada

Oshawa station, known as Durham College Oshawa GO Station by GO Transit for sponsorship reasons, is a station for commuter rail, passenger rail and regional bus services in Oshawa, Ontario, Canada. It is the terminal station for the Lakeshore East line of GO Transit and serves Via Rail's Corridor service, which travels from Toronto to both Ottawa and Montreal. The bus terminal is served by bus routes of GO Transit and Durham Region Transit.

== History ==
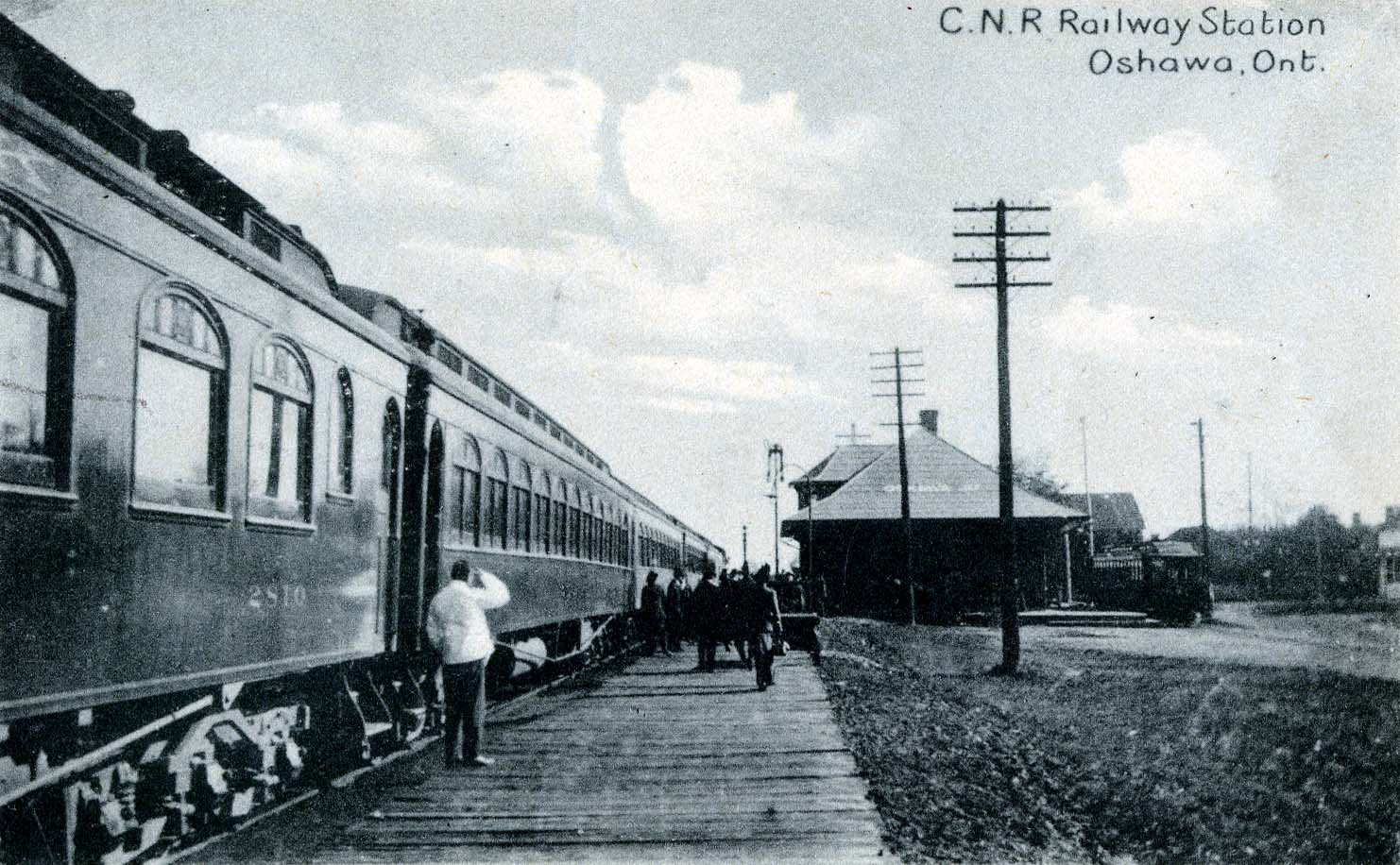
Old CNR station

The Grand Trunk Railway between Montreal and Toronto was completed in 1856 and the first Oshawa station was where Albert Street met the GTR tracks. In 1923, the Grand Trunk was absorbed by the Canadian National Railway (CN) who, in the 1960s, built a single-floor station with a flat roof west of the original station where the CN yard is now on the north side of the tracks. The building was expanded and upgraded by Via Rail in the early 1990s and GO Transit's Lakeshore East line was extended to there in 1995.

On November 24, 2017, the modernization of the Oshawa GO Station was completed and opened to the public. It was announced two years earlier as a joint project between Via Rail and Metrolinx, the province's public transit agency. The CA$14 million projects included upgrades to the modern ticketing counter, a waiting area with bigger public washrooms, and a pedestrian bridge to the Via platform which made it easier for drivers, pedestrians and cyclists to access the station.

== Via Rail services ==
The station is regularly served by intercity trains on the Corridor routes between Toronto and Montreal or Ottawa. In 2009, Via Rail announced the planned construction of a new fully accessible station adjacent to the existing building as part of major improvements to the Kingston Subdivision, the main line between Toronto and Dorval.

== GO Transit services ==
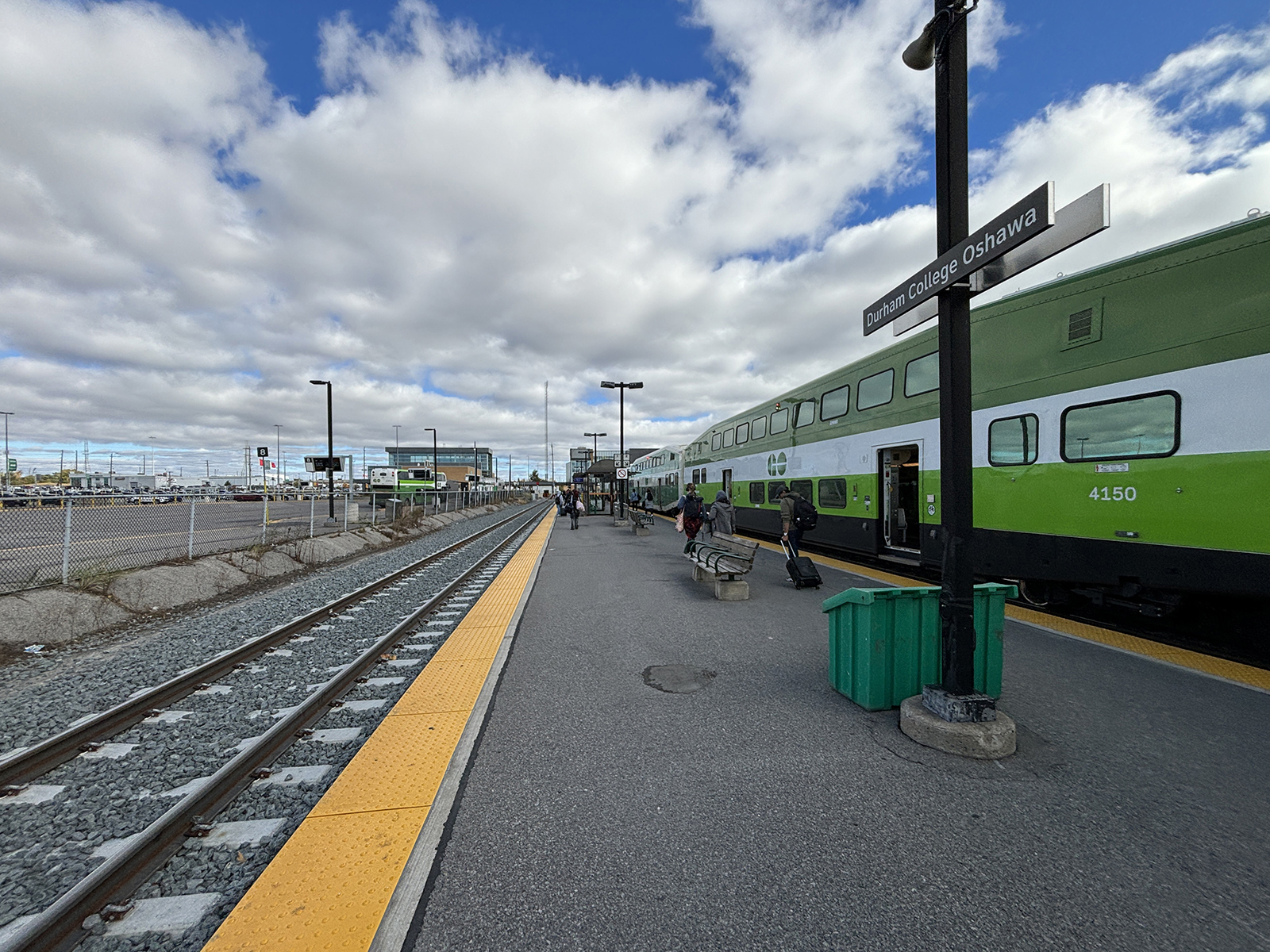
Oshawa GO transit platforms

Oshawa is the eastern terminus of GO's Lakeshore East line train service, operating in its own dedicated trackage east of Pickering. This is one of the only two terminal stations in the GO transit system located at the actual end of line trackage, the other one is West Harbour GO Station located in Hamilton. There are eastbound GO bus connections serving Courtice, Bowmanville, and Peterborough to the east, via Highway 2, Highway 115, and/or Highway 401. There are westbound GO bus connections serving Whitby, Ajax, Pickering, Scarborough and Toronto, via Highway 2 and/or Highway 401.

In October 2022, Oshawa GO station became the first Metrolinx station to enter into a naming partnership agreement. The naming rights of the station was sold to Durham College as part of a 10 year agreement. Subsequently, the station was renamed to Durham College Oshawa GO Station, which will take into effect on the station building itself, maps, and other assets owned by Metrolinx. The station is located 30 minutes away by bus from the college's main campus.

In 2014, GO Transit was planning to cease services to the station as part of a project to extend GO train service to Bowmanville, replacing it two new stations within Oshawa. By 2023, Metrolinx had changed plans. GO trains would still serve the station in addition to the proposed new stations in Oshawa. On the east side of the station, a new GO spur branch would be built curving north to connect to the CPKC's Belleville Subdivision corridor.

== Connecting bus services ==
Durham Region Transit:

- 403 to Oshawa Centre Terminal
- 421 to Courtice
- 902 to Bowmanville/Trulls Road via Oshawa Centre Terminal

GO Transit:

- 52 - 407 East Bus
- 56 - Oshawa/Oakville Bus
- 88 - Peterborough/Oshawa Bus
- 90 - Lakeshore East Early Morning Bus
- 92 - Oshawa/Yorkdale Local Bus
- 96 - Oshawa/Finch Express Bus

Durham Region Transit serves the city of Oshawa and surrounding cities such as Whitby, Port Perry, Ajax, Pickering and Clarington.

Durham Region Transit tickets, passes, and transfers are accepted on GO buses operating within Durham Region, allowing riders to freely transfer between DRT and GO buses to complete a trip within the region. Passengers transferring to and from GO routes outside of Durham Region can transfer to/from DRT for free.
