= Bowmanville GO Station =

Planned railway station in Ontario, Canada

Bowmanville
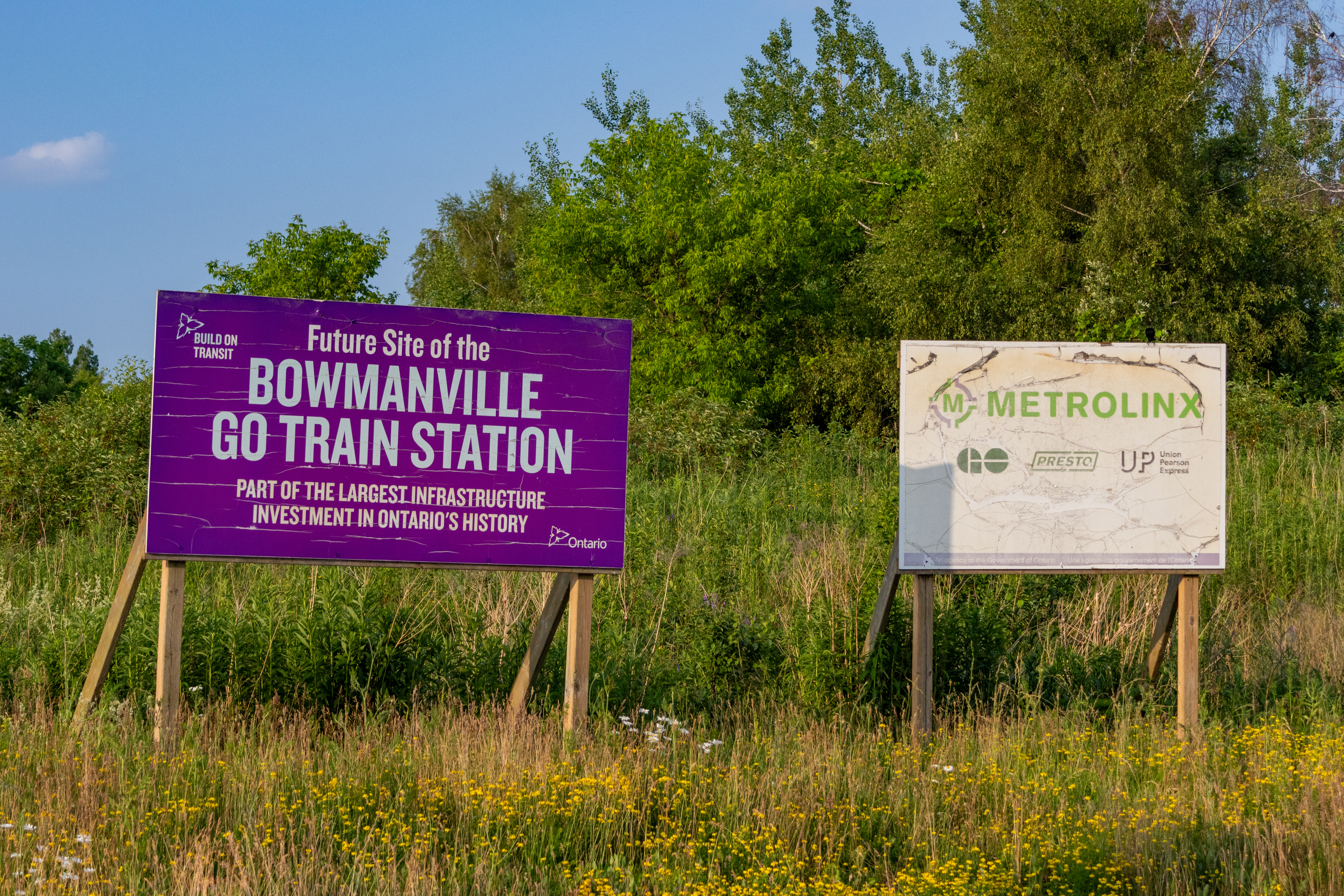

General information
- Location: Bowmanville Avenue; Clarington, Ontario
- Coordinates: 43°54′27″N 78°42′13″W
- Owner: Metrolinx
- Platforms: Island platform
- Tracks: 2
- Connections: Durham Region Transit

Construction
- Parking: 770
- Accessible: Yes

History
- Opening: TBD

Services
Preceding station	GO Transit	Following station
Courtice towards Union	Lakeshore East (planned expansion)	Terminus
Location

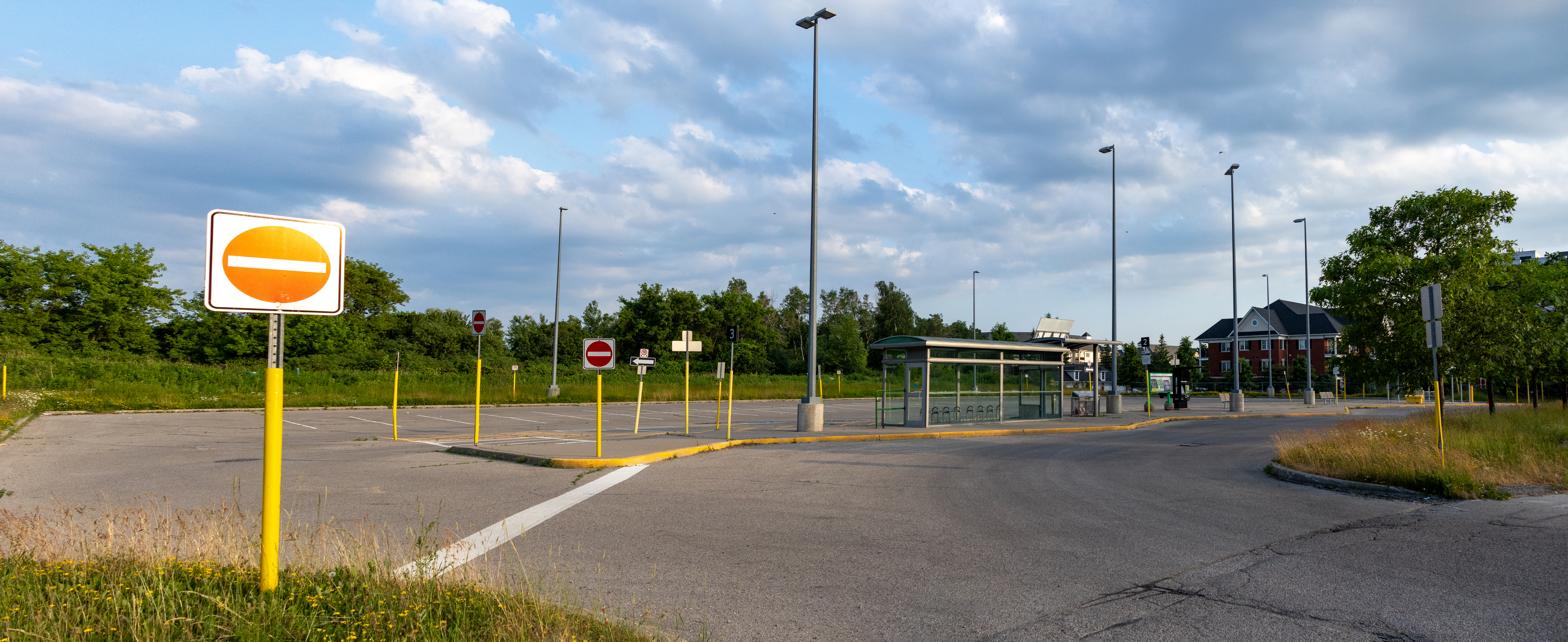
Current site of the Bowmanville GO park and ride

Bowmanville GO Station is a planned GO Transit train station to be built by Metrolinx in the community of Bowmanville within the municipality of Clarington, Ontario, Canada. It will be the terminus station of GO Transit's approved expansion of train service on the Lakeshore East line and will become a transit hub for Durham Region Transit and GO Transit. According to a 2011 environmental impact assessment, the station would have about 770 parking spaces, a bus loop and a kiss and ride area on the south side of the station. The station will be located on the south side of CP Rail's Belleville Subdivision and, as a terminal, it will have two stub tracks.
