= GO Transit =

Regional public transit system in Ontario

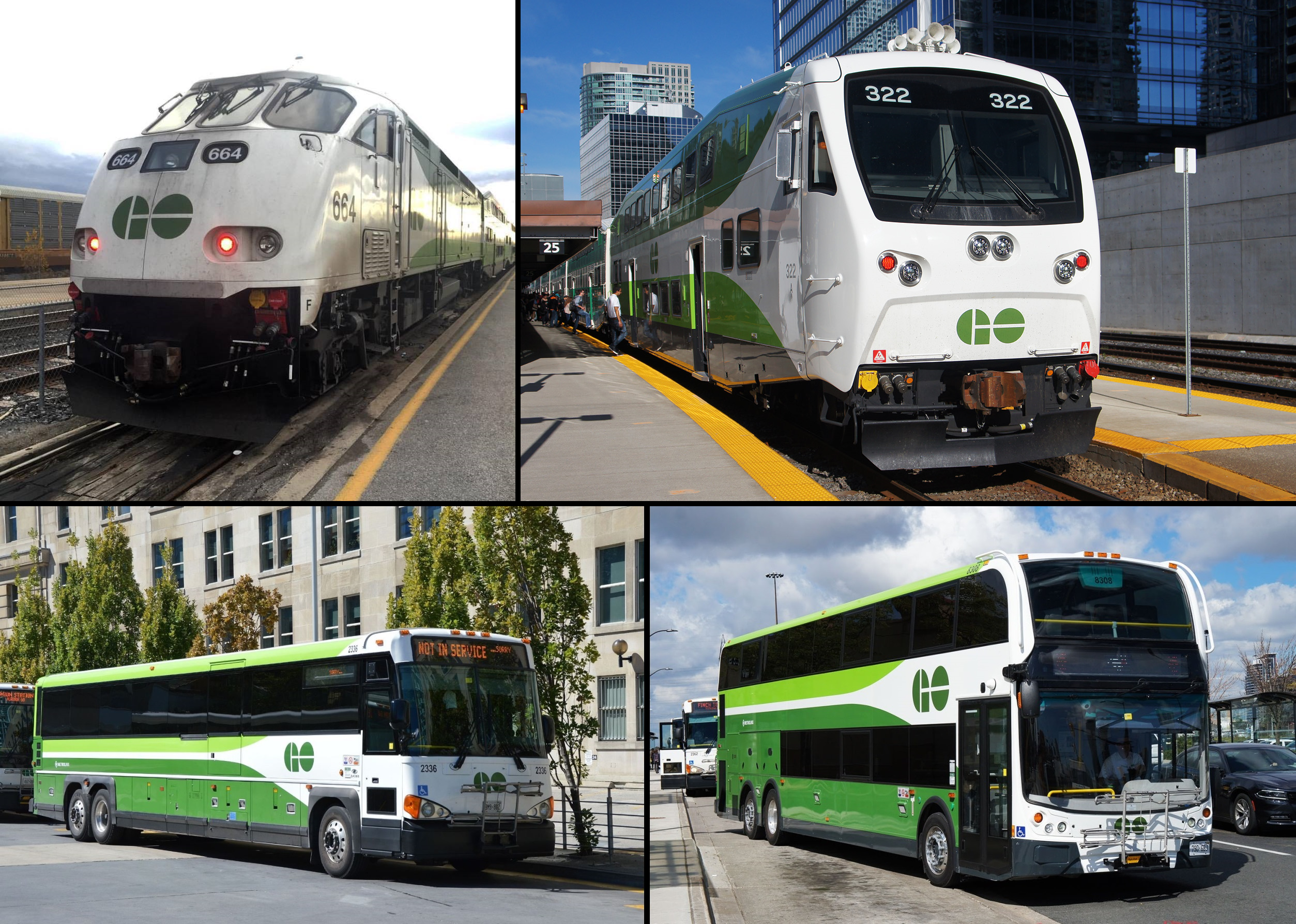

Overview
- Owner: Metrolinx
- Locale: Greater Golden Horseshoe
- Transit type: Regional rail; Intercity bus service
- Number of lines: 7 rail + 39 bus
- Number of stations: 71 rail 15 bus + numerous stops
- Daily ridership: 343,900 (weekdays, Q2 2026)
- Annual ridership: 79,165,600 (2025)
- Key people: Michael Lindsay (President & CEO)
- Headquarters: Toronto, Ontario, Canada
- Website: gotransit.com

Operation
- Began operation: May 23, 1967; 59 years ago
- Operator: Alstom
- Reporting marks: GOTX
- Infrastructure managers: Canadian National Railway; Canadian Pacific Kansas City; Metrolinx
- Number of vehicles: 96 locomotives; 979 passenger coaches; 752 buses (269 single-level, 248 double-decker)

Technical
- System length: 532.3 kilometres (331 mi) (rail); 2,776 kilometres (1,725 mi) (bus)
- Track gauge: 1,435 mm (4 ft 8 1/2 in) standard gauge

GO Transit is a regional public transit system serving the Greater Toronto and Hamilton Area and the Greater Golden Horseshoe region of Ontario, Canada. With its hub at Union Station in Toronto, GO Transit's green-and-white trains and buses serve a population of more than seven million across an area over 11,000 square kilometres (4,200 sq mi), stretching from Stratford in the west to Peterborough in the east, and from Barrie in the north to Niagara Falls in the south. In 2025, the system had a ridership of 79,165,600. GO Transit operates diesel-powered double-decker trains and coach buses, on routes that connect with all local and some long-distance inter-city transit services in its service area.

GO Transit began regular passenger service on May 23, 1967, as a part of the Ontario Ministry of Transportation. Since then, it has grown from a single train line to seven commuter rail lines. GO Transit has been constituted in a variety of public-sector configurations. Today, it is an operating division of Metrolinx, a provincial Crown agency with overall responsibility for integrative transportation planning within the Greater Toronto and Hamilton Area and is projected to grow dramatically with electrification, increased frequency and new stations through GO Expansion, which is scheduled to be completed in phases through 2025–2032.

== History ==
=== Early days ===
Cities in and around the Greater Toronto and Hamilton Area (GTHA) expanded greatly during the 1950s, influenced by growth in immigration and industrialization. Much of the existing commuter service was provided by the Canadian National Railway (CN), which faced mounting pressure to expand its service beyond the Lakeshore trains it ran between Hamilton in the west and Danforth in the east, to Toronto; however, CN lacked the financial and physical capital to do this. Real improved commuter service was not considered until the 1962 Metropolitan Toronto and Region Transportation Study, which examined land use and traffic in the newly created Metropolitan Toronto. The idea of GO Transit was created out of fear of becoming lost in years of planning; it was "approached as a test, but recognized to be a permanent service". In May 1965, the government of Ontario granted permission to proceed with the launch of Canada's first specially designed commuter rail service, at a cost of CA$9.2 million ($89.9 million in 2025 dollars).

=== Creation, growth and recession ===
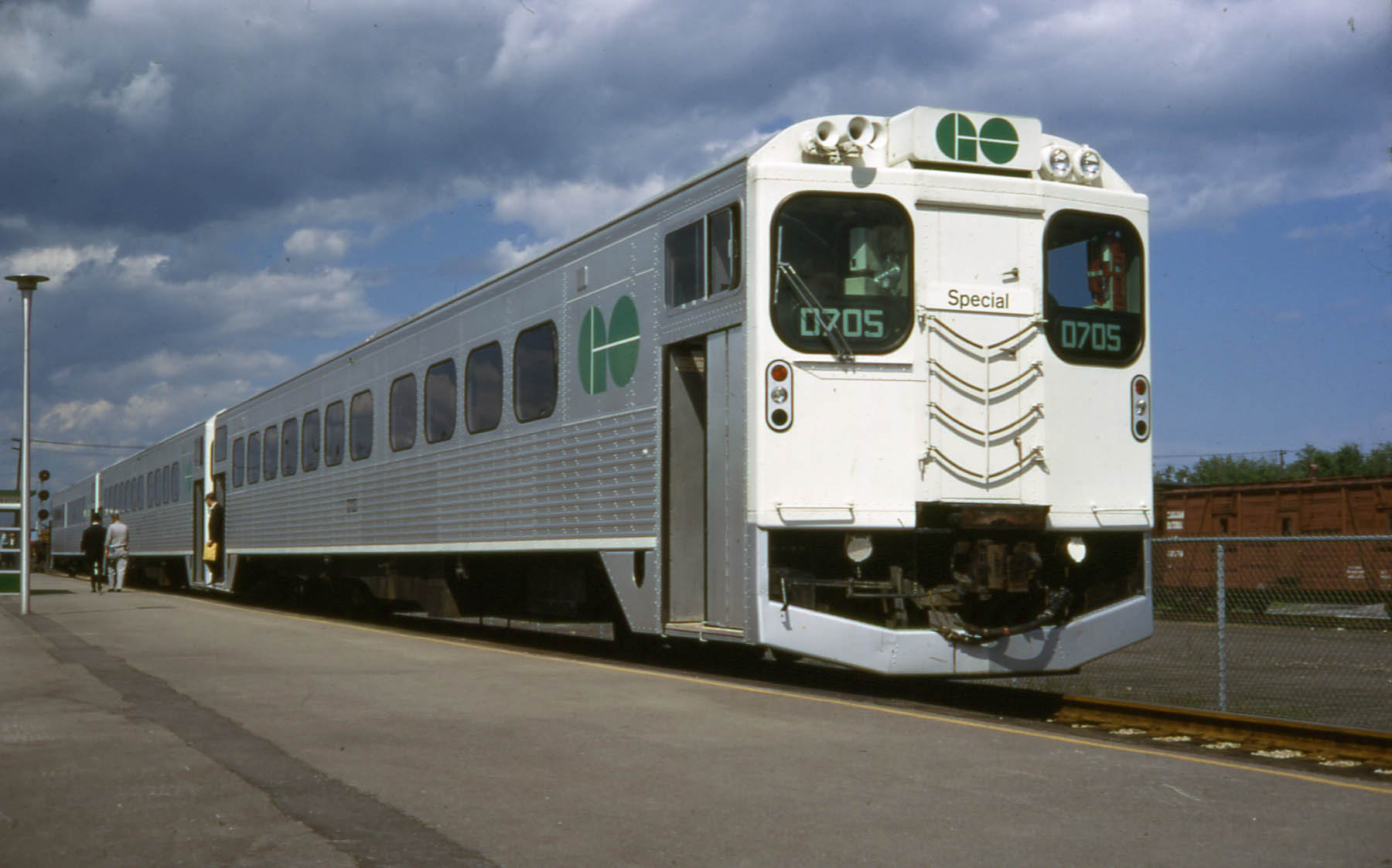
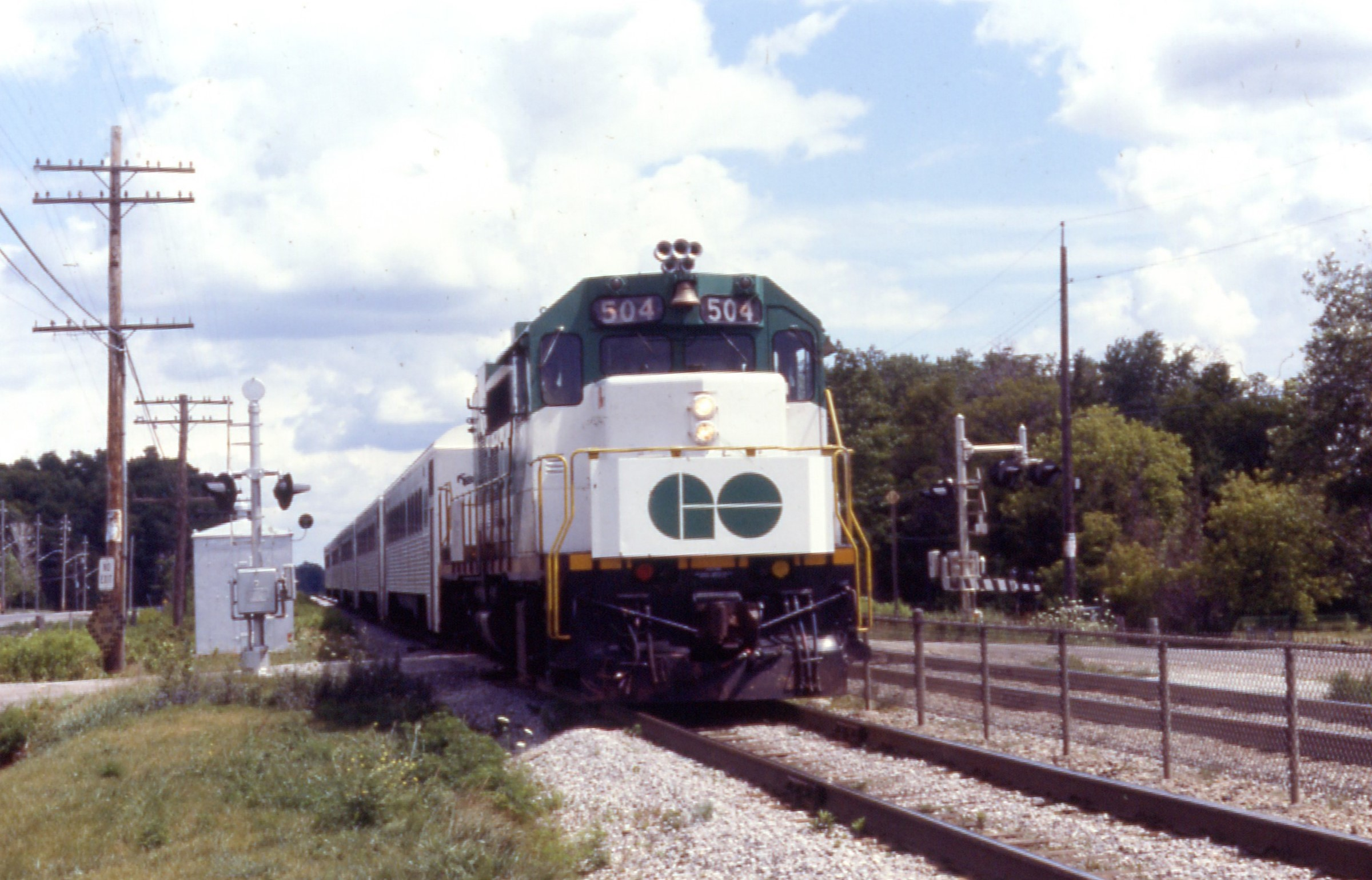
Single-level GO Transit trains from the 1960s and 1970s.

Government of Ontario Transit (later shortened to "GO Transit") started as a three-year long experiment on May 23, 1967, running single-deck trains powered by diesel locomotives in push-pull configuration on a single rail line along Lake Ontario's shoreline. GO Train service ran throughout the day from Oakville to Pickering with limited rush hour train service to Hamilton. The experiment proved to be extremely popular; GO Transit carried its first million riders during its first four months, and averaged 15,000 per day soon after. This line, now divided as the Lakeshore East and Lakeshore West lines, is the keystone corridor of GO Transit. Expansion of rail service continued in the 1970s and 1980s, aimed at developing ridership in with the introduction of the Georgetown (now Kitchener) line in 1974 and the Richmond Hill line in 1978. The Milton GO Train line opened in 1981, followed by the Bradford (now Barrie) and Stouffville lines a year later, establishing GO Transit's present-day service of seven rail corridors.

Other than establishing new rail corridors, GO Transit introduced the Bombardier BiLevel Coaches in 1978, in order to increase the number of passengers carried per train. These unique rail cars were developed in partnership with Bombardier Transportation. One year later, in 1979, the former Bay Street GO concourse at Union Station was built to accommodate these additional passengers. GO Bus service began on September 8, 1970, extending the original Lakeshore line to Hamilton and Oshawa, as well as providing service north to Newmarket and Barrie. It eventually became a full-fledged network in its own right after 1989, feeding rail service and serving communities beyond the reach of existing trains.

Near the end of 1982, Ontario Minister of Transportation and Communications James W. Snow announced the launch of GO-ALRT (Advanced Light Rail Transit), an interregional light rail transit program providing $2.6 billion (1980 dollars) of infrastructure. Although this plan was not implemented, certain key objectives from it were established in other ways: additional stations were built, all-day service to Whitby and Burlington was established and networks of buses and trains interconnected the network.

GO extended limited rush hour train service on the Bradford, Georgetown and both Lakeshore lines and began offering off-peak service on the Milton line in 1990. Train service was also extended to Burlington on the Lakeshore West line in 1992. In a series of cost-cutting measures, then–Ontario Premier Bob Rae announced a "temporary" reduction in spending on services, causing all of the expansions of the 1990s to be reduced or eliminated.

=== Reconfiguration and revival ===
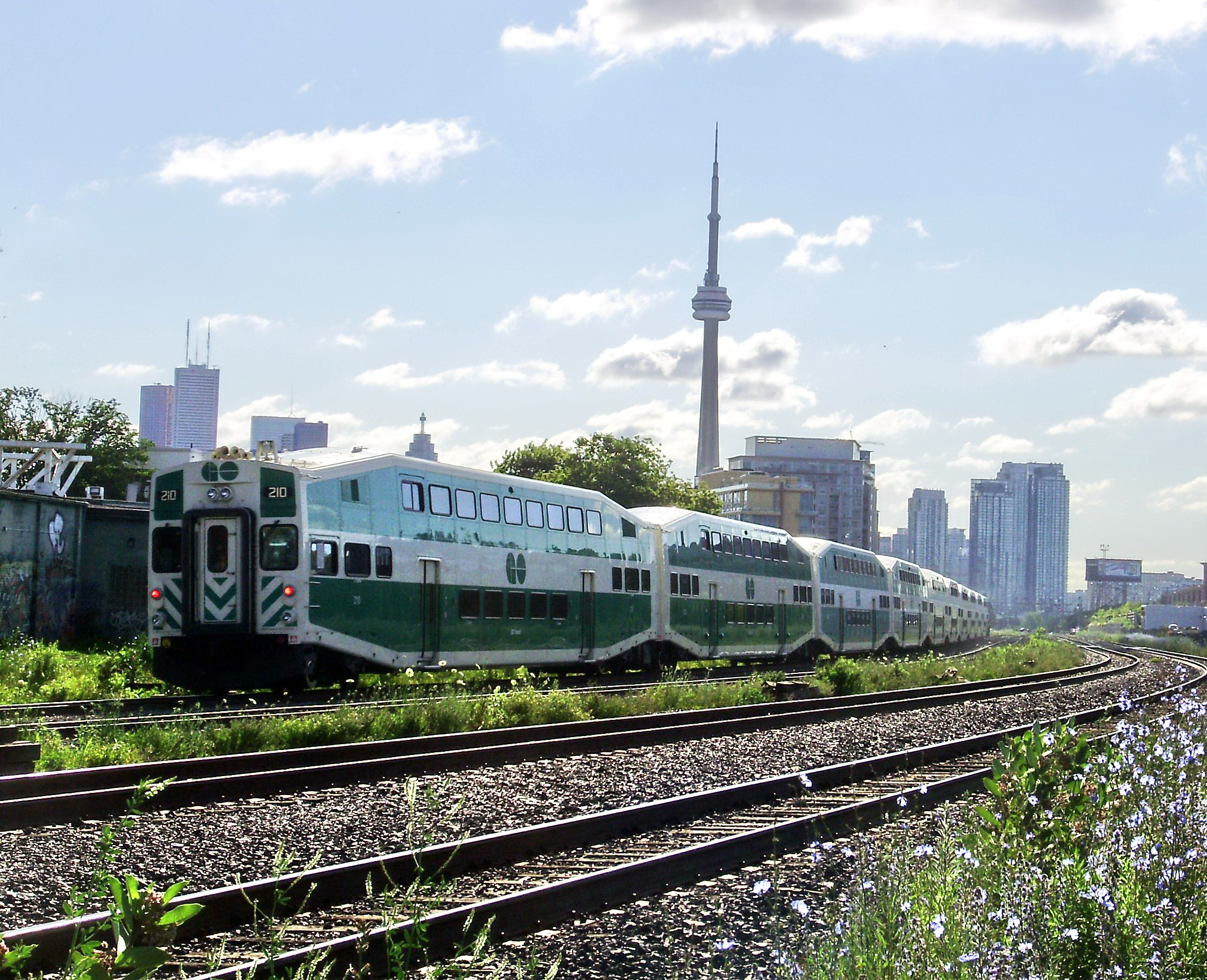
A typical GO Transit train with Bombardier BiLevel Coaches

All day train service was restored from Burlington to Whitby, and peak service was finally brought to Oshawa in 2000. A large initiative to expand the GO Transit network, under the GO Transit Rail Improvement Plan, or GO TRIP, started in the mid-2000s. CA$1 billion was invested in multiple rail and bus projects, making it the largest commuter rail project in Canadian history. This was later dwarfed by a further slate of new GO infrastructure proposed in MoveOntario 2020, the provincial transit plan announced by Premier Dalton McGuinty in the leadup to the 2007 provincial election. With re-investment in regional transit, GO experienced growth in its train network: all day service was restored to Oshawa in 2006 and Aldershot in 2007; service was expanded to Barrie South in 2007, to Lincolnville in 2008, to Kitchener in 2011, to Gormley in 2016, to Bloomington in 2021, and an excursion train operated on summer weekends to Niagara Falls. This service was later expanded to all year round.

GO Transit also went through three major reconfigurations. In January 1997, the province announced it would transfer funding responsibility for GO Transit to GTHA municipalities. The Greater Toronto Services Board, composed of regional municipality chairs, city mayors and municipal councillors, was created as a municipal agency in January 1999, and GO Transit became an arm of this agency in August 1999. However, then-Premier Mike Harris announced the province would re-assume funding responsibility for GO Transit two years later, and this was completed with the abolition of the Greater Toronto Services Board on January 1, 2002. The Greater Toronto Transportation Authority was created in 2006, with the responsibilities of co-ordinating, planning, financing and developing integrated transit in the GTHA. This agency was merged with GO Transit in 2009 under the name Metrolinx. GO Transit continued as an operating division alongside two other major initiatives: the Union Pearson Express and Presto card.

=== Future ===
As part of the 2011 provincial election, Premier Dalton McGuinty made a campaign pledge to provide two-way, full-day train service on all corridors. Metrolinx continues to plan for this service expansion, which is now known as GO Expansion. Part of Metrolinx's Big Move regional transportation plan, it is estimated to cost $4.9 billion and serve 30 million additional riders by 2031. Other possible future rail service extensions identified in GO Transit's 2020 plan include Niagara Region, Bolton, Brantford, Peterborough and Uxbridge. Metrolinx also announced plans in January 2011 to electrify the Lakeshore West, Lakeshore East and Kitchener rail lines, as well as the Union Pearson Express.

In 2021, Metrolinx announced a pilot service to London, Ontario, with one train towards Toronto in the morning and one train returning to London in the evening. This pilot ended in October 2023 after 2 years. In 2026, service resumed on this corridor but only as far as Stratford.

Improvements are being made to Toronto's Union Station, which is the busiest passenger transportation facility in Canada, and is expected to have its current passenger traffic double in the next 10 to 15 years. Improvements underway include a new roof and glass atrium covering the platforms and railway tracks, new passenger concourses, additional staircases and vertical access points and general visual improvements to the station. Other longer term options such as a second downtown station are also being studied to meet future demand.

GO Transit is currently undergoing a major expansion project to improve train service, known as GO Expansion. The project will electrify the Lakeshore East, Barrie, and Stouffville lines, the Lakeshore West line as far as Burlington, the Kitchener line as far as Bramalea, and increase train frequency on various lines to 15 minutes or better on these corridors, with several new stations being built both within Toronto and throughout the GTHA. It will also bring all-day, two-way service to the inner portions of the Barrie, Kitchener and Stouffville lines. GO Transit will increase the number of train trips per week from 1,500 (as of 2015) to about 2,200 by 2020 and expand to 10,500 weekly trips upon completion. Most of the extra trips will be in off-peak hours and on weekends. The expanded services, new infrastructure and electrification is projected to roll out in phases between 2025 and 2030. The 10-year regional express rail plan will cost $13.5 billion and will require 150 kilometres (93 mi) of new track, including new bridges and tunnels.

Starting January 1, 2025, the consortium ONxpress was to take over the operation and maintenance of the GO Transit train system from Alstom in addition to introducing the improvements required for GO Expansion. ONxpress had a division named ONxpress Operations Inc. which consisted of Deutsche Bahn International Operations and Aecon Concessions. However, by May 2025, Metrolinx and ONxpress mutually agreed to terminate the agreement. Alstom would continue to handle maintenance and operations.

== Service ==
=== Service area ===
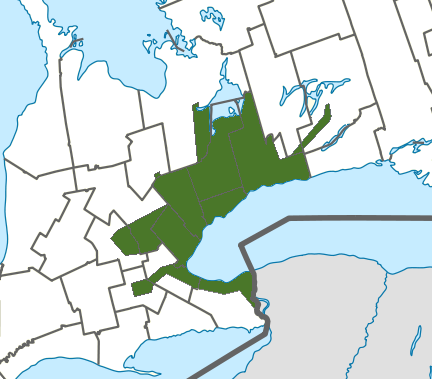
Approximate service area of GO Transit in the Golden Horseshoe region of Southern Ontario

GO Transit primarily serves the Greater Toronto and Hamilton Area–the cities of Toronto and Hamilton and the surrounding regions of Halton, Peel, York and Durham. GO Transit's lines extend into the nearby Niagara and Waterloo Regions, the cities of Brantford and Peterborough, and Simcoe, Dufferin, Perth and Wellington counties—an area largely coextensive with the Greater Golden Horseshoe. Under the provincial charter, GO Transit is permitted to serve cities elsewhere in Ontario, but has no plans of doing so.

In total, GO trains and buses serve a population of 7 million in an 11,000 square kilometres (4,200 sq mi) area radiating in places more than 140 kilometres (87 mi) from downtown Toronto. Present extrema are Brantford and Kitchener to the west; Orangeville, Barrie to the north; Peterborough and Newcastle to the east; and Niagara Falls to the south.

The GO system map shows seven train lines (or corridors), all departing from Toronto's Union Station and mostly named respectively after the outer terminus (or former terminus) of train service:

Lakeshore West (to Hamilton and Niagara Falls, with buses to Brantford)
Lakeshore East (to Oshawa, with buses to Bowmanville and Peterborough)
Milton
Kitchener (to Kitchener and Stratford)
Barrie
Richmond Hill
Stouffville (to Lincolnville, with buses to Uxbridge)

Although colours are assigned in a consistent fashion to each line in all official media, in colloquial parlance lines are only ever referred to by their names. Buses are numbered in blocks of 10, corresponding to the nearest train line, with the 40s and 50s reserved for express services along the 407 ETR corridor which does not have a corresponding train line.

=== Operations ===
==== Rail ====
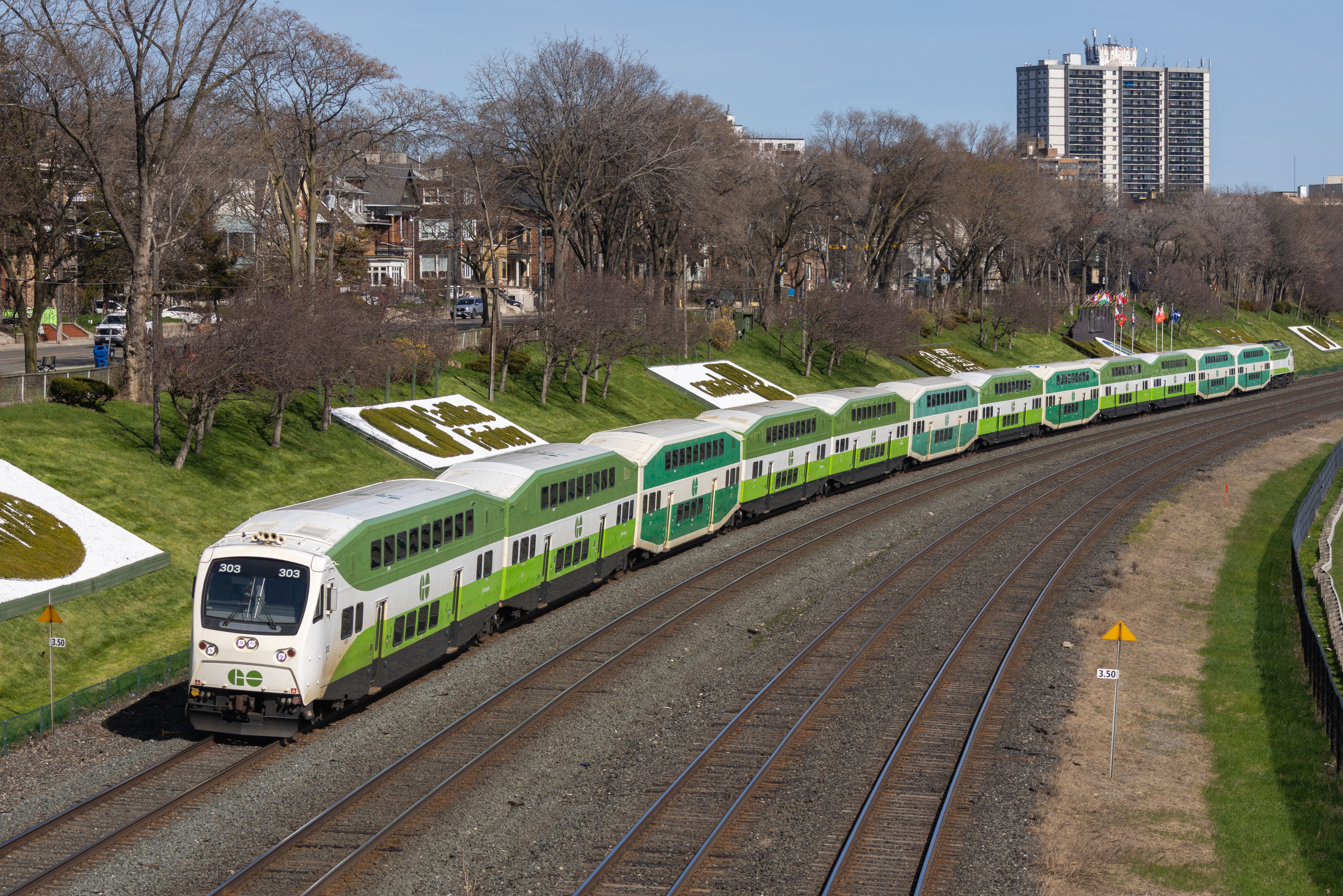
A GO Train along the Lakeshore West line

GO Transit's commuter rail services (reporting mark GOT) carry the large majority of its overall ridership. Until 2012, five GO Train lines operated only during weekday rush hour periods in the peak direction (inbound towards Union Station in the morning and outbound in the afternoons and early evenings), with off-peak service on these routes being provided solely by buses. Since then, hourly off-peak train service or better has been added to five of these lines. The present off-peak service is as follows:

- the Lakeshore West and Lakeshore East lines operate half-hourly trains on weekdays off-peak hours and every 15 minutes on weekend afternoons, with weekend service on Lakeshore West extending as far as Niagara Falls. Nearly all trains on the two lines are through-routed, making it possible to travel between Aldershot (or Niagara Falls) and Oshawa without having to change trains at Union Station.
- the Kitchener line provides hourly, two-way midday and late evening service as far as Mount Pleasant station in Brampton on weekdays only, with two off-peak weekday trains going all the way to Kitchener. On weekends, two-way hourly service is provided as far as Mount Pleasant only.
- the Barrie line has all-day weekday and weekend train services along the entire line, although most of them only go as far as Aurora
- the Stouffville line has hourly midday and late evening service as far as Mount Joy on weekdays only and hourly weekend service in both directions

The Richmond Hill and Milton lines continue to operate during rush hours only, although there has been an increasing number of trips on these lines in recent years. As part of the Regional Express Rail plan, there are plans to eventually offer two-way, all-day 15-minute or better service on the central sections of the remaining five lines. Nevertheless, rush-hour service accounts for over 90 per cent of GO Train ridership.

===== Rolling stock =====
GO Transit's rolling stock uses push-pull equipment. Its passenger car fleet is composed entirely of Bombardier BiLevel Coaches built in Thunder Bay, Ontario. These double-decker coaches, which have an elongated-octagon shape, were designed in the mid-1970s for GO Transit by Hawker Siddeley Canada as a more efficient replacement for GO's original single-deck coaches, built by the same company. Later coaches were manufactured by Can-Car/UTDC and the most recent coaches are produced by Bombardier Transportation and since acquired by Alstom, which now owns the designs and manufacturing facilities. GO Transit owns 979 BiLevel Coaches. This type of coach is also used by a number of other commuter railways across North America. They have a seating capacity of 162 and a standing capacity of 248 per coach, or 5,256 per train (maximum crush load). All upper levels of the coaches on rush hour trains are designated "Quiet Zones".

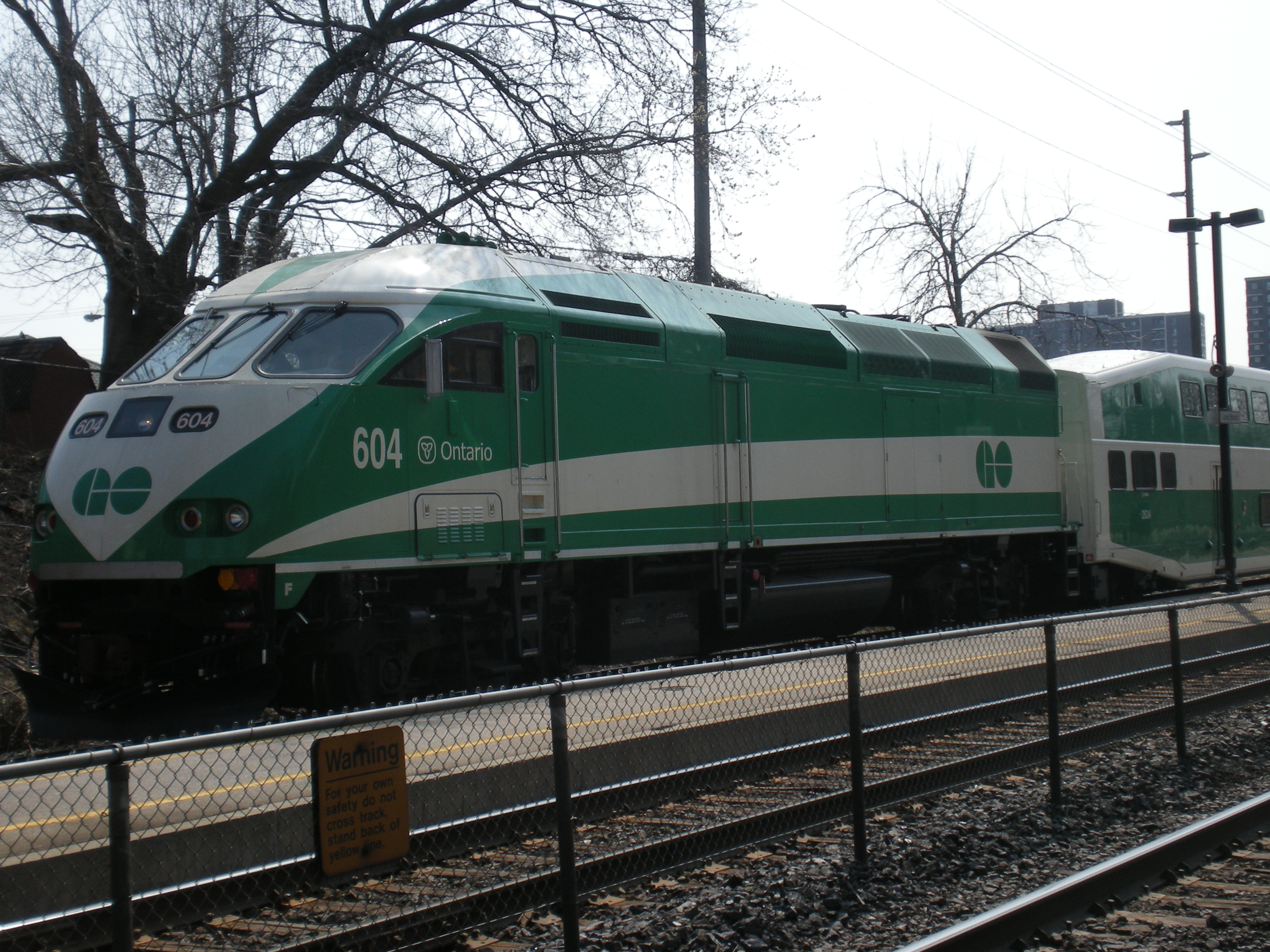
An MP40PH-3C locomotive

The coaches are primarily hauled by MPI MPXpress series locomotives. The current model, the 4000-horsepower MP40PH-3C, is more powerful than its predecessor, the EMD F59PH. It is capable of pulling or pushing trains of 12 coaches instead of 10. More than 60 of these locomotives have been ordered since their introduction in 2006, with a further 16 types of an even more powerful model, the 5400-horsepower MP54AC, which can pull a full 12 car train more efficiently. Opposite the locomotive, trains are bookended by cab cars, which are coaches with driver controls incorporated into them. The locomotives face east while the cab cars face west. GO Transit upgraded their entire cab car rail fleet with newly designed, more crashworthy cab cars in the summer of 2015, incorporating an improved visibility, safety features and comfort for train crews.

Rolling stock is maintained at the Willowbrook Rail Maintenance Facility, located west of Mimico station in Toronto and at the newer Whitby Rail Maintenance Facility. The Willowbrook facility occupies the Willowbrook Yard, a historical freight yard established by Grand Trunk Railway in 1910. GO Transit acquired the yard from Canadian National sometime after its inception, and built and expanded the Willowbrook facility there to maintain the expanding fleet. GO Transit built a second maintenance facility covering 500,000 square feet (4.6 hectares) in Whitby to accommodate additional trains for its upcoming Regional Express Rail project, and was completed by the end of 2017. A limited number of old cab cars, which resembled standard coaches with the addition of a cab at the end, are still operating, with 15 old cab cars being rebuilt and reintroduced for expanded GO service.

===== Ownership and crews =====
GO has always owned its locomotives and coaches, but its trackage used to be owned entirely by Canada's two major commercial railways: the large majority by the Canadian National Railway (CN) and the remainder (the current Milton line) by Canadian Pacific Railway (CP, now CPKC). In 1988, as part of expanding service east of Pickering, GO built its first section of self-owned purpose-built trackage. From 1998 until 2009, GO owned only six per cent of the railway trackage on which it operated. Starting in 2009, Metrolinx incrementally acquired further trackage from the two commercial railways in order to improve GO service. As of 2014, Metrolinx has complete ownership of the Barrie, Stouffville and Lakeshore East lines, and a majority of the Lakeshore West, Richmond Hill, and Kitchener lines. CPKC still owns most of the Milton line. This puts Metrolinx ownership at 69 percent of GO Transit's trackage.

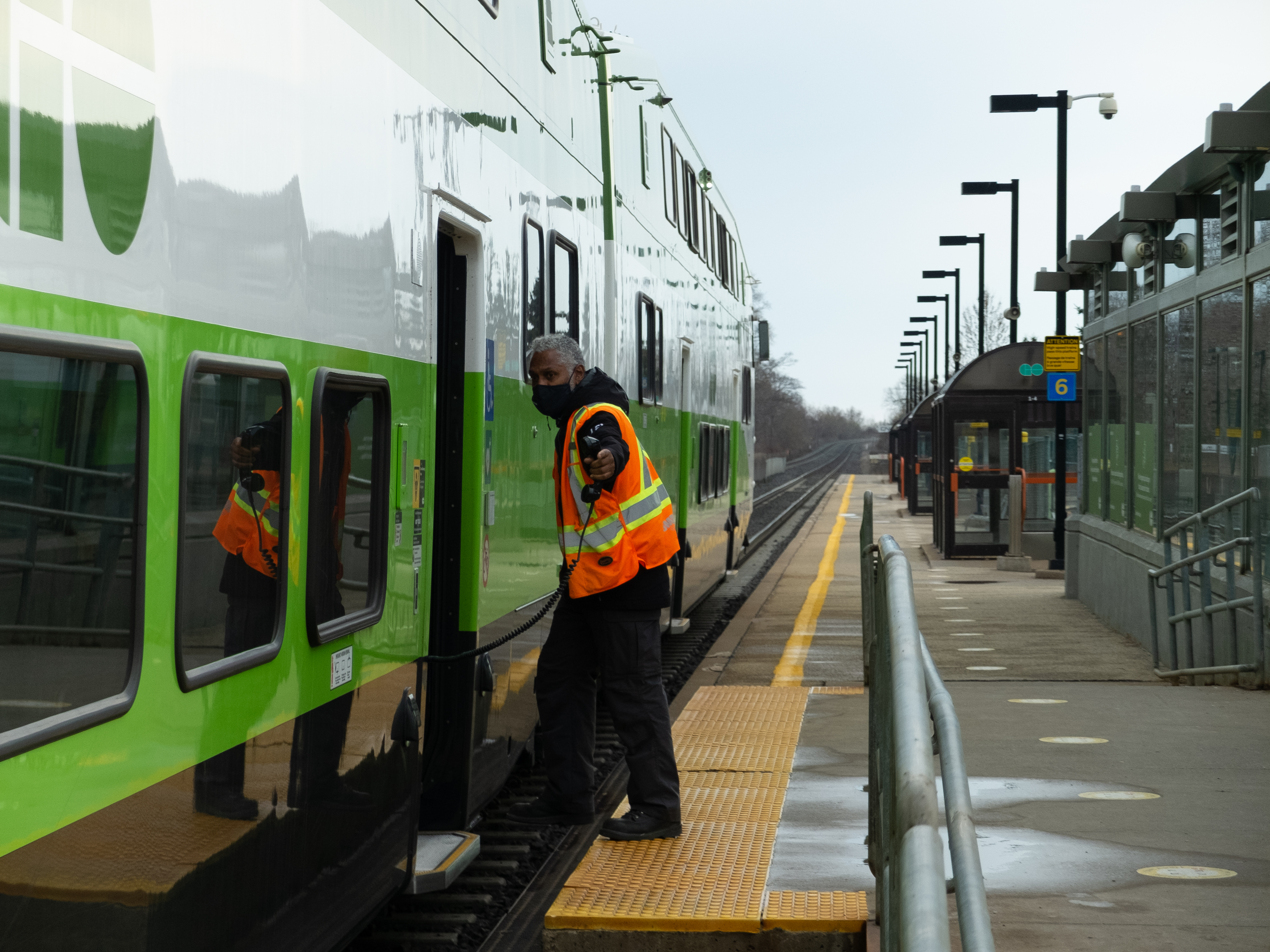
A Customer Service Ambassador points at the doors after closing them at Rouge Hill Station for safety

Each train runs with a three-person crew: two operators control the train from the cab at the front end of the train and handle related operations, while a third crew member is the Customer Service Ambassador. Stationed in a designated car in the middle of each train, the Customer Service Ambassador operates the doors and wheelchair ramp, makes station stop announcements, and is dedicated to assisting customers on board. Alstom Transport is responsible for providing train operations, taking over from Bombardier Transportation in 2021. GO trains achieve on-time performance of approximately 95 per cent, and a refund will be provided if a train is more than 15 minutes late, with some conditions.

==== Bus ====
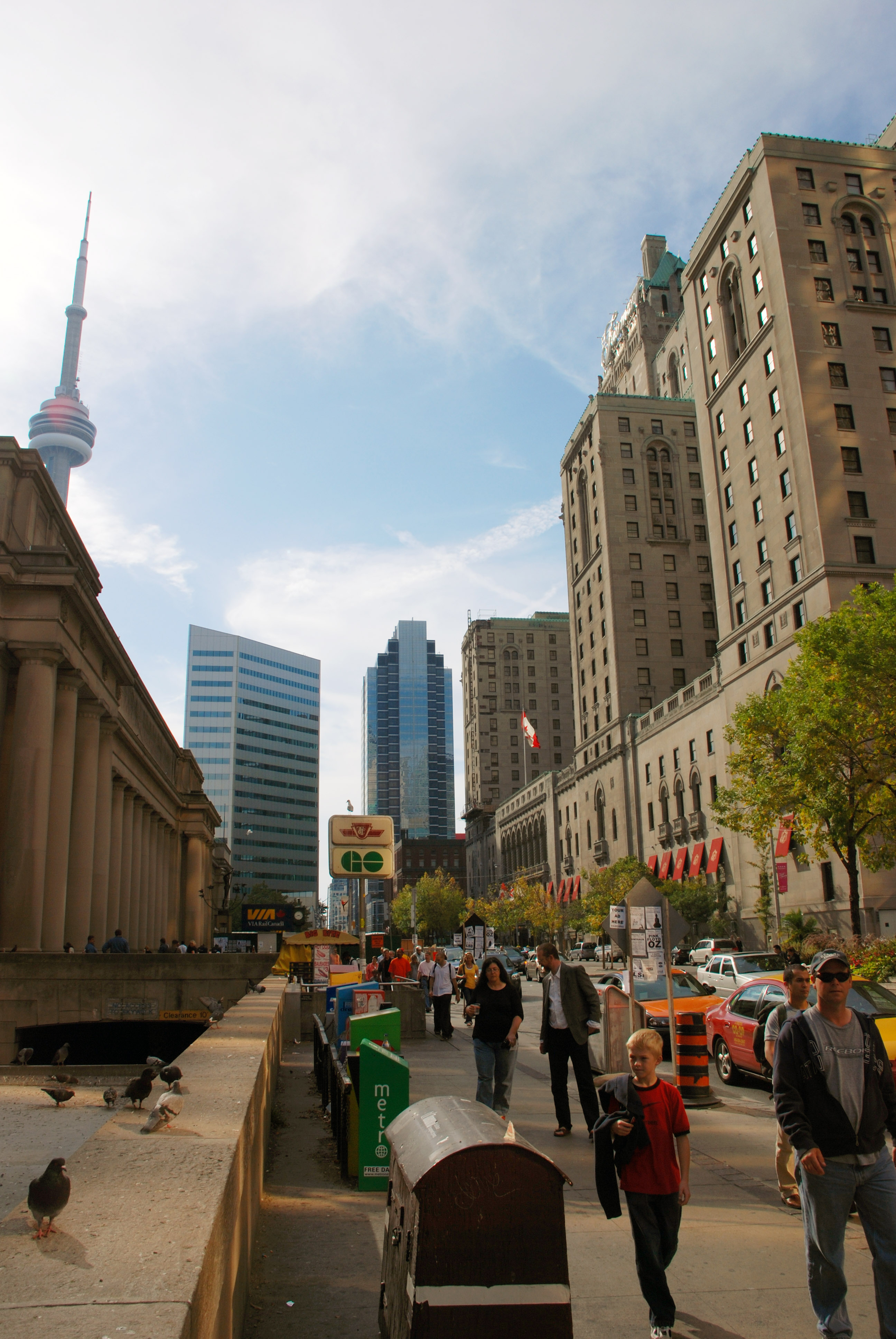
Thousands of passengers move between GO and TTC service at Union Station on Toronto's Front Street

GO Bus service consists of a combination of routes, many of which stand in for train service when it is not operating and/or which extend the reach of train service to communities beyond their terminal. Other GO buses are independent of rail services, such as the Highway 407 series of routes, which provides an orbital-type service that encircles Toronto proper and makes connections between all train lines. There are also routes that serve Pearson International Airport and seasonal destinations such as several colleges and universities. The vast majority of GO train stations have connecting GO bus service, of which almost all the exceptions are situated within Toronto proper. There are also 16 bus terminals served by GO buses, many of which provide local transit connections, as well as intermediate stops and ticket agencies.

The first buses operated by GO Transit, a suburban variant of the GM New Look bus, were unveiled at Queen's Park on August 11, 1970, about a month before commencing operations on its expanded services east, west and north of Toronto. Operated by Gray Coach, a pilot program to test them was conducted in Pickering before they entered service on 8 September 1970. Later buses included a combination of single-door, suburban-type transit buses built by Orion Bus Industries and New Flyer, and single-level highway coaches built by Prevost Car and Motor Coach Industries (MCI, now a subsidiary of New Flyer).

Today, GO Transit operates a combination of single-level coach buses and commuter-type double-decker buses. All buses are equipped with bike racks and are wheelchair accessible. Most of the older buses in the fleet are 45-foot (13.72 m), single-level D4500CT coach buses built by Motor Coach Industries, which can seat 57 people and features a platform lift. The first models of this type entered service in 2001 and orders have continued until 2015. In April 2008, GO began operating 43-foot (13.11 m) Enviro 500 double-decker buses built by British manufacturer Alexander Dennis in the United Kingdom. These buses come in three different designs differing mainly in their size and height. All double deckers have a low-floor design and a wheelchair ramp at the front door.

The first two batches of double deckers have a height of 4.2 metres (13 ft 9 3/8 in), too tall to meet many height standards set by the provincial Ministry of Transportation. Thus, they are restricted to routes which avoid low bridges and underpasses. In particular, they are found exclusively on routes on the Highway 407 and Highway 403 corridors, providing service between Peel and York Regions.

In 2012, GO ordered new Enviro500 double-decker units for its fleet. Designated as "Go-Anywhere" models, they have a redesigned front end, based on the Enviro400 (and which would later form the basis for the global Enviro500 MMC refreshed design), and a height of 4.1 metres (13 ft 5 7/16 in), 10 cm (3 15/16 in) lower than the previous models. The lower height allows these buses to meet many more clearance standards as a result and are used on a wider variety of routes, including those that travel on Highway 401. Three additional batches of "Go-Anywhere" Enviro500s were ordered until 2015.

Despite the lower height, these buses are still too high to fit in a number of GO terminals, namely Hamilton, Yorkdale, York Mills, and Union Station. Beginning in 2016, GO Transit began placing further orders of Enviro500 double-deckers. These buses, designed specifically for the GO Transit network and designated as "Super-Lo", have an even lower height of 3.9 metres (12 ft 9 9/16 in), low enough to operate on virtually the entire GO bus network. They also have a longer length than previous orders, being 45-foot (13.72 m) long (the same as its coach buses), and dedicated space for luggage at the rear. The chassis for these vehicles are being locally assembled at a newly established facility in Vaughan, creating up to 30 new full-time jobs.

=== Stations and connections ===
GO Transit stations are designed to provide seamless and barrier-free connections between its trains and buses. They include amenities such as elevators, washrooms, parking, pay phones, ticket vending machines, ticket sale kiosks and automated teller machines. All GO stations have Presto card readers. Most bus terminals are also served with a ticket sales booth or vending machine. As of 2016, the capital costs of building a GO Transit train station is about $50 to $75 million.

Most GO stations include large commuter parking lots, some of which have recently included large parking structures, and also include onsite bus loops for buses making timed connections to GO Buses.

Some GO train stations are shared with Union Pearson Express (commuter train services from Toronto's Union Station to Pearson Airport), Via Rail (Canada's national passenger rail services) and Amtrak (which offers passenger train service to the United States). GO also connects with fifteen other municipal transit providers, such as the Toronto Transit Commission (TTC) and York Region Transit (YRT), as well as several long-distance intercity bus services, such as Ontario Northland, Megabus, FlixBus, and United States-bound Greyhound Lines services. Metrolinx calls many of these transfer points between services mobility hubs, and it has made them a priority as it moves forward with The Big Move regional transportation plan.

=== Ridership ===
GO Transit Annual Ridership (2017)
Corridor	Riders	%	
Lakeshore West	17.7 million	25.8%	
Lakeshore East	13.7 million	20.0%	
Kitchener	8 million	11.7%	
Milton	7 million	10.2%	
Barrie	4.6 million	6.7%	
Stouffville	3.9 million	5.7%	
Richmond Hill	2.5 million	3.6%	
Total – GO Rail System			57.4 million
Bus	11.1 million	16.2%	
Total			68.5 million

On an average weekday, GO runs 322 train trips carrying 206,167 riders, and 2,386 bus trips carrying 48,477 passengers. This adds up to 254,644 passengers throughout the entire system. In 2017, GO Transit ridership totalled 68.5 million, and if expansion plans are realized, is projected to total over 200 million by 2055.

At least 91 per cent of the train ridership is to and from Union Station in downtown Toronto, while about 70% of all bus passengers travel to and from the City of Toronto. The average trip taken by a passenger is 33.5 kilometres (20.8 mi) long. Most GO Transit commuters have a private vehicle available to them for their commute, but choose to use GO Transit instead. About 80% of train commuters and 60% of bus commuters choose GO Transit over driving. Over half of GO's ridership occurs on the Lakeshore West and East lines, which can be attributed to the almost continuous development along their corridors, as well as being the only two lines with two way, all day service since their inception. This is followed by the Milton line, carrying almost 14% of all ridership. Other corridors carry 4–11% of riders each.

== Fares ==
A train departure board at Kennedy station

Fares on the network are based on a zone tariff set between two specified points by GO Transit, and the type of passenger using the ticket. Tickets are sold for single trip, or passes for one day or one month. Tickets can be used on a GO train, bus, or a combination of both. Paper tickets can be purchased at train stations, bus terminals and ticket agencies, while e-tickets can be purchased online at GO Transit's ticketing website. Passenger categories exist for adults, youth, post-secondary students, and seniors. As of March 1, 2025, passengers aged 12 and under, members of the Canadian Armed Forces, and veterans can ride GO Transit fare-free.

Other than standard e-tickets, GO Transit also offers promotional e-tickets. These include the Weekend Pass, which costs $10 and allows for unlimited travel across the entire GO network for a single person on a single Saturday, Sunday or statutory holiday, and Weekday Group Passes, which cost between $30 and $60 and allow for unlimited travel on a weekday (excluding holidays) for a group of 2 to 5 people. These two types of tickets are available exclusively online and are not available at ticket machines or by using PRESTO.

The PRESTO card, available on all GO trains and buses, is a unified smart card-based payment system used throughout the Greater Toronto and Hamilton Area. Presto is a sister operating division of Metrolinx and the card can also be used on numerous local transit agencies in the GTHA such as the Toronto Transit Commission (TTC) and York Region Transit (YRT) as well as on OC Transpo in Ottawa. As of April 21, 2024, free transfers exist for all connecting local transit systems throughout the GTHA – in many cases using a Presto card or contactless credit card and their associated mobile wallets (where accepted) – are included with the GO Transit fare.

The Presto system allows passengers to load money on a reloadable card. Passengers pay their fare by "tapping" on and off on busses and trains. With each tap, the system calculates the fare for the ride along with a discount from the full fare ticket depending on the card type, and it is deducted from the balance of the card. The card can also be linked to a credit or debit card and set on autoload, so that it automatically adds a certain amount of money as soon as the balance decreases past a certain level.

Since August 11, 2022, contactless credit/debit cards (Visa, MasterCard, American Express, Interac) and their associated mobile wallets such as Apple and Google Pay have been accepted on GO Transit in which a passenger taps on and off with their credit card on a PRESTO card fare reader. Contactless credit cards can also be used to pay transit fares – by tapping on PRESTO fare readers – across the Greater Toronto Area and are eligible for the free transfer on those supporting transit services providers which is included in the cost of the GO Transit fare (where accepted).

GO Trains use a "proof-of-payment" policy where the fare system is run on an "honour system". Passengers are required to carry a valid GO paper or digital ticket or pass, a tapped-in credit/debit card/mobile wallet or Presto card to prove that they paid for their fares. Passengers may be subject to random fare inspections at any time during travel. This system is designed to reduce costs and improve efficiency. Enforcement of this system is carried out via Metrolinx's By-law No. 2 that, by reference to the Provincial Offences Act, imposes a $35 to $200 fine for fare evasion.

Although children ages 0 to 12 years of age, CAF members, and veterans can ride fare-free on GO Transit, they may be required to show proof of eligibility when getting a Presto card.

== Logo ==
The GO logo and colours were adjusted in 2013.

The GO Transit logo has remained largely unchanged since the agency was founded. The design was created by Gagnon/Valkus, a Montreal-based design firm that was also responsible for the corporate identities of Canadian National and Hydro-Québec. The firm's team wanted to create a unified logo using the initials of the Government of Ontario ("GO"), via two circles with a T incorporated into it. Lead designer Frank Fox described the creation of the logo as "a happy accident. More or less, we had this feeling among us that this couldn't be true. We went off trying many other solutions, but nothing else was good enough."

The logo has since become woven into the cityscape of Toronto, and is a prominent identifier of the agency. As one graphic design expert stated, it achieved "an enviable goal that most graphic designers strive to accomplish with any logo they design". Only one minor revision was made after the original version was unveiled: while the G and O used to touch each other, a gap now exists with a bolder white T to enhance them. The primary corporate colour was known as "GO Green", matched the green on Ontario Highway signs, and was used on all vehicles, signage, and printed material. In 2013, GO introduced a two-tone colour scheme that changed the primary colour to a darker green, and added a second lighter apple green. The changes were made to better harmonize with the branding of Metrolinx and its other operating divisions, as well as to improve its display digitally.

== Safety and security ==
=== By-law No. 2 ===
GO Transit By-law No. 2 is a document of rules and regulations governing actions of passengers and employees while on GO Transit property, which includes land, facilities, trains, buses and other structures. Besides issues relating to fares, the by-law specifies permissible and prohibited actions such as staying in designated safe areas, commercial or distribution activities, parking and other personal actions that promote or endanger the safety of passengers. It covers items like paying fares, parking, general behaviour, fines and rule enforcement. These rules can be enforced by a "proper authority" which is defined as "an employee or agent of GO Transit wearing a GO Transit uniform [or] carrying an identification card issued by GO Transit, a GO Transit Special Constable, or a municipal police officer". Any contravention of the by-law can result in a fine under the Provincial Offences Act.

=== Enforcement ===
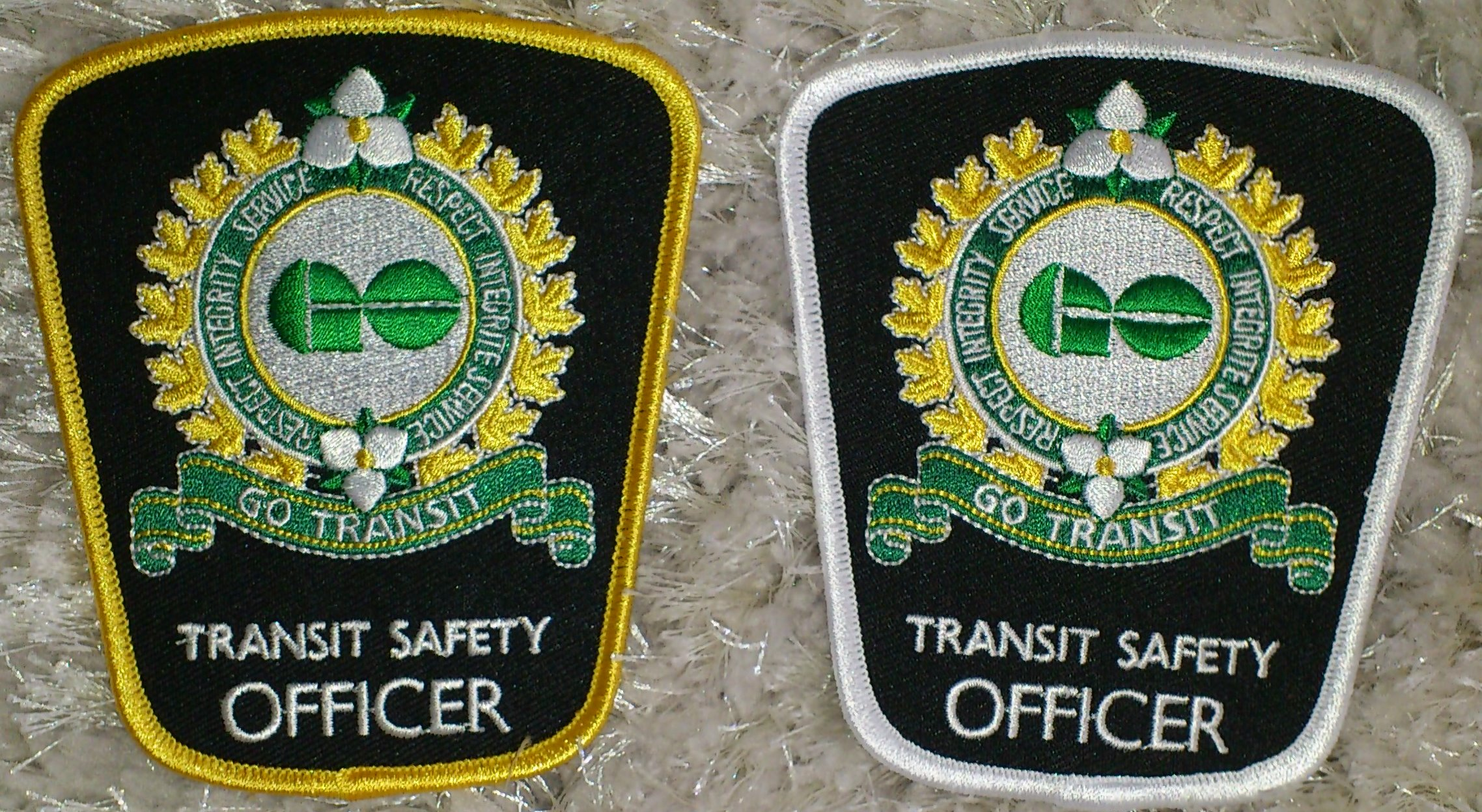
Shoulder flashes for GO Transit Safety Officers

GO Transit employs Transit Safety Officers, who are designated special constables that patrol Metrolinx properties, and are responsible for ensuring passenger safety and protection, enforcing relevant laws or by-laws, offering customer assistance and supporting local police, fire and ambulance, and promoting railway safety. Under the Police Services Act, Transit Safety Officers are appointed by the Commissioner of the Ontario Provincial Police, with approval from the Minister of Community Safety and Correctional Services. In addition to By-law No. 2, they have the authority to enforce other certain federal and provincial laws.

GO Transit also employs Provincial Offences Officers, known as Revenue Protection Officers, to enforce the proof-of-payment system. GO Transit operates a 24-hour Transit Safety Communications centre operated by Communications Operators. They are mainly responsible for taking calls from the public with regards to actionable complaints, dispatching special constables or relevant emergency services to all areas serviced by Metrolinx.

=== Incidents ===
On December 12, 1975, a westbound GO train collided with a Toronto Transit Commission (TTC) bus that was stalled on a crossing at St. Clair and Midland Avenue. Nine passengers on the bus were killed and 20 others were injured. This was the worst accident in terms of loss of life in the history of the TTC and GO Transit systems. The level crossing was replaced by an overpass a few years later.

On November 17, 1997, an empty train collided with another train waiting to depart Union Station with over 800 passengers on board. The empty train's locomotive engineer was at the opposite end of the train, and the conductor at the leading end failed in his attempts to relay the situation to the engineer or apply the emergency brake. The two trains then collided at a speed of 19 km/h (12 mph), causing a partial derailment and minor injuries to fifty-four passengers and two crew members. The subsequent Transportation Safety Board report made recommendations, including making emergency brakes more accessible and that the locomotive engineer must always control the train from the leading end in the Union Station Rail Corridor.

On July 8, 2013, a Richmond Hill–bound GO train encountered flash flooding in the Don Valley when a record-breaking 123 mm rain storm fell over a few hours in Toronto area. As the crew worked to reverse the direction of the train back to Union Station, flood waters continued to rise and submerged the entire track and the train itself began to flood. Approximately 1,400 passengers on board had to be rescued by boat.

On January 14, 2015, a GO bus on Highway 407 near Weston Road hit a guard rail and rolled into a ditch. One passenger was ejected and crushed to death, and another two in addition to the bus driver were injured. On March 2, 2015, the GO Transit driver was charged with careless driving causing death.

On March 14, 2024, two GO trains with a combined 400 passengers narrowly avoided a severe head-on collision. The two-man crew in the cab of one of the trains were distracted with other tasks and failed to see a red signal, while the other train was running at 86.9 kilometres per hour (54.0 mph) in the opposite direction. Both trains came to a stop within 167 metres (548 ft) of each other. The Transportation Safety Board investigated the incident and recommended fail-safe systems to guard against human error. GO Transit and Alstom reviewed procedures given the TSB report.

On January 6, 2026, a westbound GO train on the Lakeshore West line came within 1.5 seconds of a serious derailment with probable casualties, according to an internal Metrolinx report. The train approaching Oakville GO at 112 km/h (70 mph) ignored a red signal and went over a crossover which had a speed limit of 24 km/h (15 mph). Alstom subsequently dismissed the two train operators on board the train because of the incident. Unlike transit systems elsewhere in the world, GO Transit lines do not have safety systems, such as automatic braking, to guard against trains running pass a red signal.

At 8:16 AM on Monday, February 2, 2026, a GO train leaving Union Station partially derailed near Union Station, after the rear of the train came off the track and made contact with a key track switch, also causing signal issues. Due to its location, the derailed train blocked access to four platforms at Union Station. There were major delays and train cancellations throughout the evening on all seven GO Transit rail lines plus the UP Express. Many GO riders had to use the TTC to connect with other GO stations within Toronto. The derailed train was removed the following morning to allow repairs to the track and signaling system. Service reduction, delays and cancellations would last until February 7. Subsequently, investigators found that in nine sections of track, rails were fastened to ties by two instead of four fasteners causing the remaining fasteners to wear out and break. The track eventually went out of gauge by 28.6 millimetres (1.125 in). The Toronto Terminals Railway maintains track along the Union Station Rail Corridor.

== See also ==
- GO Transit fleet
- List of GO Transit stations
