= List of Durham Region Transit bus routes =

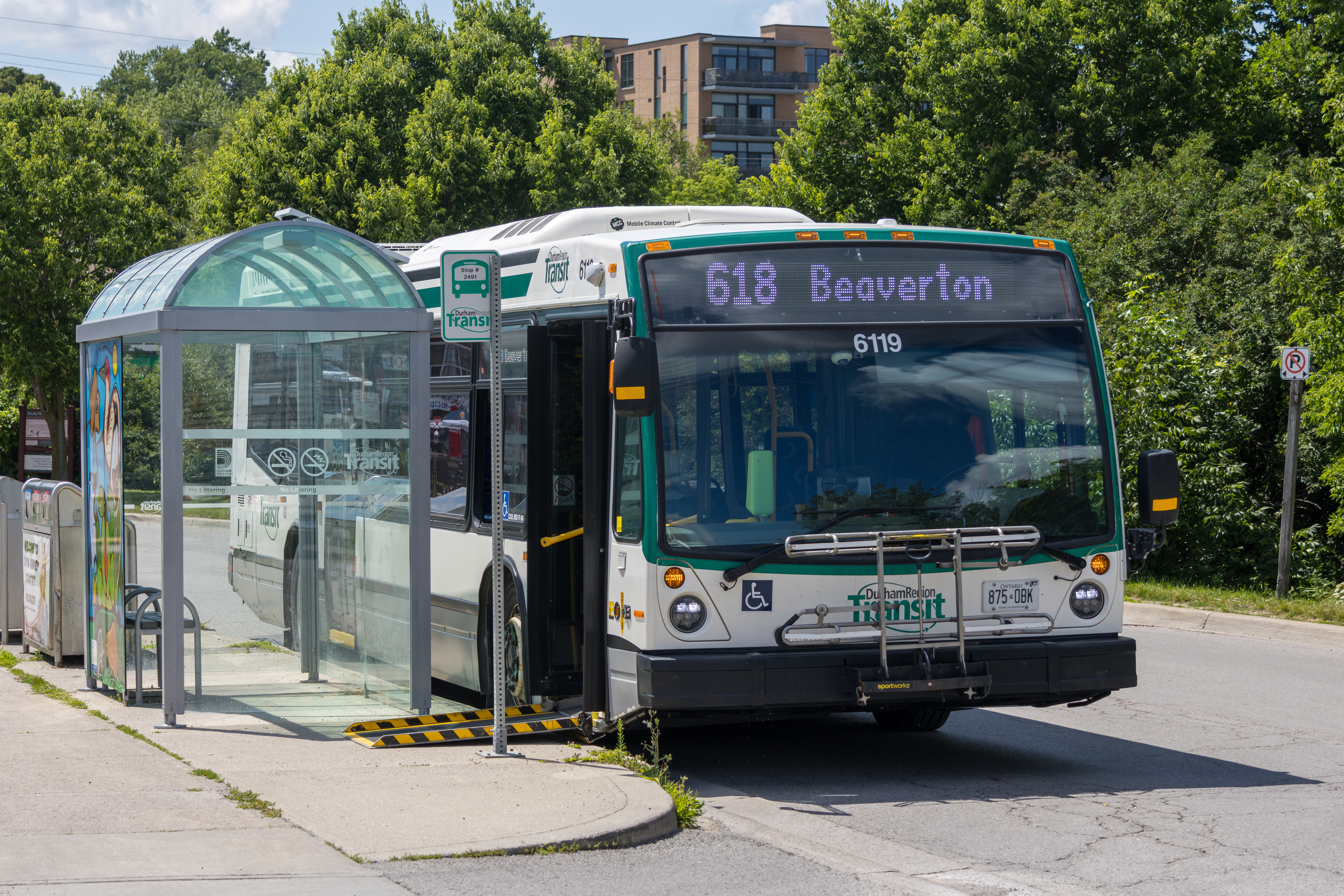
Durham Region Transit Fleet #6119 on Route 618

Durham Region Transit (DRT) operates a network of bus routes, serving as the public transportation system of the Regional Municipality of Durham in Ontario, Canada. Formed on January 1, 2006, through the amalgamation of Ajax-Pickering Transit, Whitby Transit, Oshawa Transit, and Clarington Transit, DRT operates a unified network of bus routes that provide both local and regional service across Durham Region, an area located immediately east of Toronto. The system connects a mix of urban, suburban, and rural communities—including Pickering, Ajax, Whitby, Oshawa, Clarington, Scugog, Uxbridge, and Brock—and integrates with neighboring transit providers such as GO Transit and the Toronto Transit Commission (TTC). In addition to conventional fixed-route bus service,

== Routes ==
On July 28, 2008, DRT introduced a unified route number system using a three digit format, with the first digit indicating the municipality:

- 100s: Pickering
- 200s: Ajax
- 300s: Whitby/Brooklin
- 400s: Oshawa/Courtice
- 500s: Clarington/Bowmanville
- 600s: Uxbridge
- 900s: Regional/DRT PULSE

All Durham Region Transit routes are wheelchair-accessible. As of 5 May 2025, the following routes are in operation at DRT:

Regular service
PULSE service
Blue Night Network

Route	Destinations				Division	Notes
101A	Loop	To Bay Ridges	Loop	To Pickering GO Station	Westney	Rush-hour service; 101A: clockwise service; 101B: counter-clockwise service
101B	Loop	To Bay Ridges	Loop	To Pickering GO Station	Westney	Rush-hour service; 101A: clockwise service; 101B: counter-clockwise service
112	NB	To Burkholder Drive (Seaton) via Brock Road & Taunton Road	SB	To Pickering Parkway Terminal via Brock Road & Taunton Road	Westney	
118	NB	To Burkholder Drive (Seaton) via Whites Road	SB	To Pickering Parkway Terminal via Whites Road	Westney	
121	EB	To Pickering Parkway Terminal via Glenanna Road, Finch Ave, Strouds Lane & Whites Road	WB	To Pickering GO Station via Glenanna Road, Finch Ave, Strouds Lane & Whites Road	Westney	
121A	EB	To Pickering Parkway Terminal via Sunbird Trail	WB	To Pickering GO Station via Sunbird Trail	Westney	Operates during rush-hour only
121B	EB	To Pickering Parkway Terminal via Glenanna Road, Finch Ave, Strouds Lane & Whites Road	WB	To West Shore Boulevard / Oklahoma Drive via Glenanna Road, Finch Ave, Strouds Lane & Whites Road	Westney	Weekend service only
211	WB	To Pickering Parkway Terminal via Church Street, Ravenscroft Road & Westney Road	EB	To Ajax GO Station via Church Street, Ravenscroft Road & Westney Road	Westney	
216	NB	To Taunton Road via Harwood Ave	SB	To Ajax GO Station via Harwood Ave	Westney	
216C	NB	To Audley Recreation Centre via Harwood Ave & Williamson Drive	SB	To Ajax GO Station via Harwood Ave & Williamson Drive	Westney	
224	NB	To Taunton Road via Salem Road	SB	To Ajax GO Station via Salem Road	Westney	
224C	NB	To Taunton Road via Salem Road	SB	To Ajax GO Station via Ajax Waterfront (Lake Driveway)	Westney	Seasonal, summer service
227A	Loop	To Ajax GO Station via Bayly Street, Audley Road, Dreyer Drive, and Westney Road	Loop	To Ajax GO Station via Bayly Street, Audley Road, Dreyer Drive, and Westney Road	Westney	Weekday rush hour service, operates clockwise in the AM
227B	Loop	To Ajax GO Station via Bayly Street, Audley Road, Dreyer Drive, and Westney Road	Loop	To Ajax GO Station via Bayly Street, Audley Road, Dreyer Drive, and Westney Road	Westney	Weekday rush hour service, operates counterclockwise in the PM
301	NB	To Taunton Road via Annes Street, McQuay Boulevard & Country Lane	SB	To Whitby GO Station	Westney/Raleigh	
302	NB	To North Campus Terminal via Brock Street/Baldwin Road & Carnwith Drive	SB	To Whitby GO Station	Westney/Raleigh	
302B	NB	To Anderson St & Duggan Ave via Brock Street/Baldwin Road & Carnwith Drive	SB	To Whitby GO Station	Westney/Raleigh	Weekday rush hour service
306A	Loop	To Whitby GO Station via Cochrane Street, Des Newman Boulevard & Rossland Road	Loop	To Whitby GO Station via Cochrane Street, Des Newman Boulevard & Rossland Road	Westney/Raleigh	Weekday rush hour service
306B	Loop	To Whitby GO Station via Cochrane Street, Des Newman Boulevard & Rossland Road	Loop	To Whitby GO Station via Cochrane Street, Des Newman Boulevard & Rossland Road	Westney/Raleigh	Weekday rush hour service
319	NB	To Taunton Road via Garden Street & Anderson Road	SB	To Whitby GO Station via Garden Street & Anderson Road	Westney/Raleigh	
392	NB	To Whitby GO Station	SB	To Ontario Shores	Westney/Raleigh	
403	NB	To Oshawa Centre Terminal via Oxford Street, Phillip Murray Avenue & Wentworth Street	WB	To Oshawa GO Station via Oxford Street, Phillip Murray Avenue & Wentworth Street	Raleigh	
403B	NB	To Oshawa Centre Terminal	SB	To Philip Murray Avenue	Raleigh	Weekday only rush hour service
405	NB	To Delpark Homes Centre via Wilson Road & Adelaide Avenue	WB	To Oshawa Centre Terminal via Wilson Road & Adelaide Avenue	Raleigh	
407	NB	To North Campus Terminal via Ritson Road & Conlin Road	SB	To Farewell/Raleigh	Raleigh	Weekday-only service, weekend service signed as 407 to Delpark Homes Centre
407A	NB	To North Campus Terminal via Ritson Road & Conlin Road	SB	To Farewell/Raleigh via Colonel Sam Drive	Raleigh	Weekday-only service, southbound only, every hour
407B	NB	To Delpark Homes Centre via Ritson Road	SB	To Farewell/Raleigh	Raleigh	Weekend-only service
407C	NB	To Delpark Homes Centre via Ritson Road & Nonquon Road	SB	To Farewell/Raleigh	Raleigh	Weekend-only service, northbound-only, every hour
407D	NB	To North Campus Terminal via Ritson Road, Conlin Road & Nonquon Road	SB	To Farewell/Raleigh	Raleigh	Weekday-only service, northbound-only, every hour
409	NB	To Windfields Farm Drive via Garrard Road, Conlin Road & Simcoe Street	SB	To Oshawa Centre Terminal	Raleigh	
409A	NB	To Windfields Farm Drive via Garrard Road, Conlin Road & Simcoe Street	SB	To Oshawa Centre Terminal via Rossland Road & Stevenson Road	Raleigh	Afternoon school tripper
409C	NB	To Windfields Farm Drive via Nichol Avenue & Dundas Street	SB	To Oshawa Centre Terminal	Raleigh	Hourly service
410	NB	To Harmony Terminal via Olive Ave, Harmony Road & Grandview Street	WB	To Oshawa Centre Terminal	Raleigh	
411	EB	To Trulls Road (Courtice)	WB	To Oshawa Centre Terminal	Raleigh	Weekend service only
411B	EB	To Farewell/Raleigh	WB	To Oshawa Centre Terminal	Raleigh	Late night, weekend service only
419	EB	To Harmony Terminal via Britannia Ave, Conlin Road & Grandview Street	WB	To Windfields Farm Drive/Simcoe Street	Raleigh	
421	EB	To Trulls Road	WB	To Oshawa GO Station	Raleigh	
421A	EB	To Trulls Road via Colonel Sam Drive & Oshawa Centre Terminal	WB	To Oshawa GO Station via Oshawa Centre Terminal	Raleigh	
421C	EB	To Trulls Road via Colonel Sam Drive & Avondale Road	WB	To Oshawa GO Station via Oshawa Centre Terminal	Raleigh	Afternoon school trippers
423	NB	To Harmony Terminal via Olive Ave, Harmony Road & Townline Road	WB	To Oshawa Centre Terminal	Raleigh	
502	EB	To Simpson Avenue (Lakeridge Health Bowmanville)	WB	To Prince William Boulevard	Raleigh	
507	NB	To Orono via Newcastle	SB	To Simpson Avenue (Lakeridge Health Bowmanville)	Raleigh	Replaces On-Demand service during peak hours
605	EB	To Reach Street/Coral Creek Crescent via Railway & Albert Street	SB	To Toronto Street/Welwood Drive via Railway & Albert Street	Raleigh/Westney	
618	NB	To Beaverton via Highway 7 & 12	SB	To Port Perry Terminal	Raleigh	Weekday service only
618A	NB	To Beaverton via Highway 7 & 12	SB	To Simcoe Street & Commencement Drive (Ontario Tech/DC) via Highway 7 and 12 & Simcoe Street	Raleigh	Morning and afternoon peak only
900	EB	To Ritson Road (Downtown Oshawa) via Highway 2	WB	To Centennial Circle (U of T Scarborough) via Highway 2 & Ellesmere Road	Raleigh	
900B	EB	To Ritson Road (Downtown Oshawa) via Highway 2	WB	To Pickering Parkway Terminal via Highway 2	Raleigh	
901A	NB	To North Campus Terminal via Simcoe Street	SB	To Lakeview Park	Raleigh	Operates northbound as 901B to North Campus Terminal; Late-night service extended north to Windfields Farm after 23:00
901C	NB	To North Campus Terminal via Simcoe Street	SB	To Oshawa Centre Terminal	Raleigh	Operates northbound as 901B to North Campus Terminal; Late-night service extended north to Windfields Farm after 23:00
902	EB	To Bowmanville (Lakeridge Health Bowmanville) via King Street & Highway 2	WB	To Oshawa GO Station via Oshawa Centre Terminal	Raleigh	
902B	EB	To Trulls Road (Courtice) via King Street	WB	To Oshawa GO Station via Oshawa Centre Terminal	Raleigh	Weekday-only service
902C	EB	To Trulls Road (Courtice) via King Street	WB	To Oshawa Centre Terminal	Raleigh	Weekend-only service
905A	NB	To Windfields Farm Drive/Simcoe Street via Thickson Road, Dryden Boulevard, Taunton Road & Simcoe Street	SB	To Whitby GO Station	Raleigh/Westney	
905C	NB	To Uxbridge via Port Perry	SB	To Whitby GO Station	Raleigh/Westney	Operates every 1–2 hours
915	EB	To Harmony Road/Conlin Road via Westney Road, Taunton Road & Townline Road	WB	To Ajax GO Station	Raleigh/Westney	
916	EB	To Harmony Road/Conlin Road via Brock Road, Rossland Road & Harmony Road	WB	To Pickering Parkway Terminal	Raleigh/Westney	
917	EB	To Oshawa Centre Terminal	WB	To Pickering Parkway Terminal via Bayly Street, Whitby GO Station & Ajax GO Station	Raleigh/Westney	Late-night trips operate as 917A between Pickering Parkway & Ajax GO
917Z	EB	To Oshawa Centre Terminal	WB	To Toronto Zoo	Raleigh/Westney	Seasonal summer & weekend service
920	EB	To North Campus Terminal	WB	To Scarborough Centre Station	Raleigh	Weekday, mid-day service only
920B	EB	To North Campus Terminal	WB	To Pickering Parkway Terminal	Raleigh	Operates during weekday morning and afternoon peaks only
921	EB	To North Campus Terminal	WB	To Scarborough Centre Station via Brock Road & Taunton Road	Raleigh	Express service, during morning and afternoon peak only; Runs express between Brock Road and Conlin Road
N1	EB	To Harmony Road/Conlin Road via Highway 2 & Harmony Road	WB	To Centennial Circle (U of T Scarborough) via Highway 2 & Ellesmere Road	Raleigh	Night bus routes, from 12-5AM; Replaces PULSE 900, 901
N2	NB	To Windfield Farms via Simcoe Street & North Campus Terminal	SB	To Bloor Street via Park Road & Wentworth Street	Raleigh	Night bus routes, from 12-5AM; Replaces PULSE 900, 901
