= Oshawa Transit =

Transit bus operator for Oshawa, Ontario

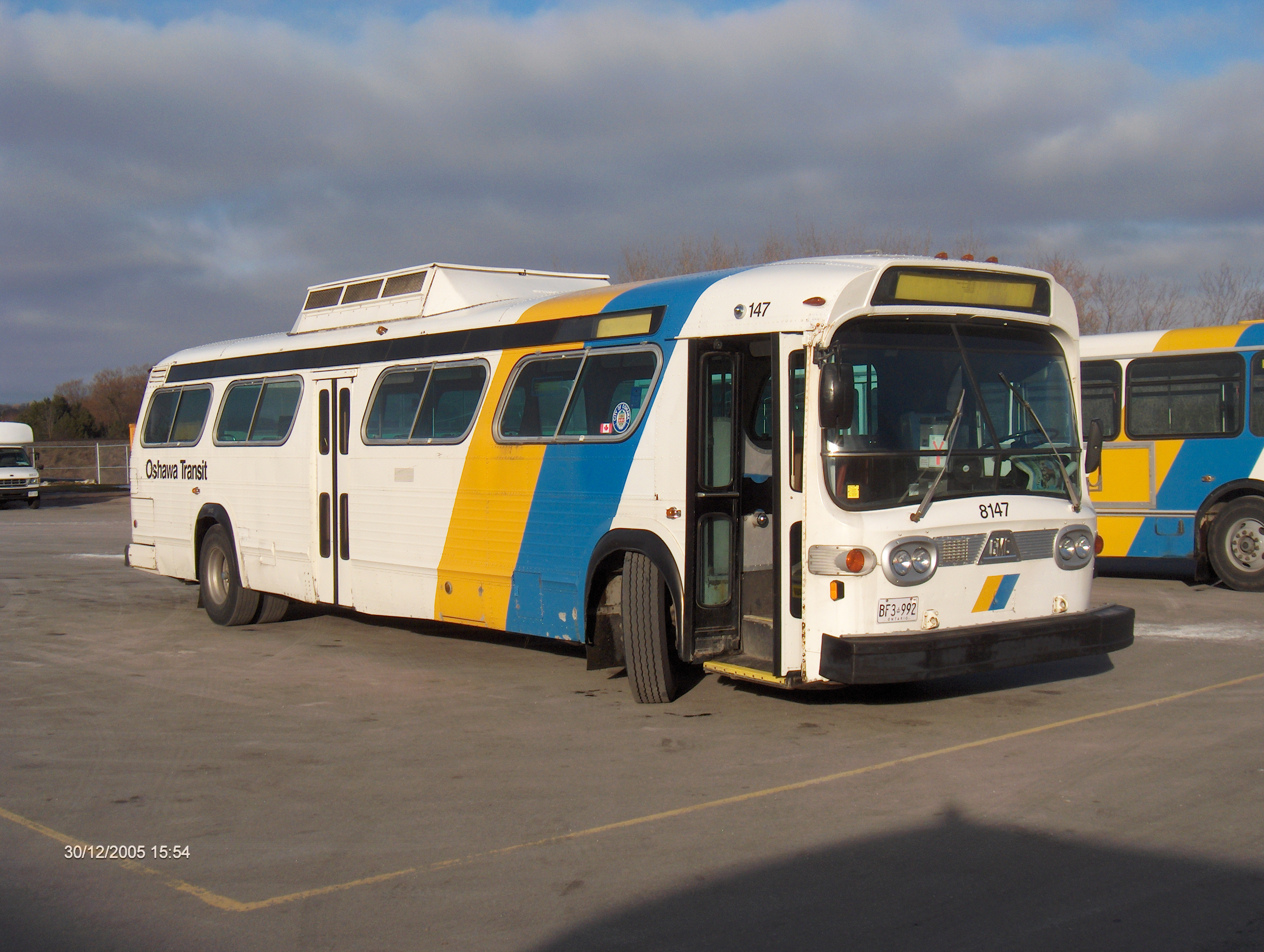
- #147 between shifts at the Oshawa Garage
- Founded: January 1, 1960
- Defunct: December 31, 2005
- Headquarters: Oshawa, Ontario
- Service area: Oshawa and east parts of Whitby
- Service type: Public transit
- Hubs: Oshawa Centre, Oshawa GO Station, Durham College/UOIT, Downtown Oshawa
- Fuel type: Diesel
- Operator: Oshawa P.U.C., Oshawa Transit Commission
- Website: www.durhamregiontransit.com as of 2006

Oshawa Transit was a public transit operator in Oshawa, Ontario, Canada, from 1960 to 2005. Its only garage and headquarters was located at 710 Raleigh Avenue in Oshawa.

On January 2, 1960, at the request of the City of Oshawa, the Oshawa Public Utilities Commission (PUC) undertook the operation of the transit system for the city. The Oshawa PUC did this until June 1996 when City Council created a new Oshawa Transit Commission. It operated until December 31, 2005, at which time Oshawa Transit was merged with Whitby Transit, Ajax-Pickering Transit, and Clarington Transit in Durham Region to form Durham Region Transit on January 1, 2006.

== History ==
Two transit agencies operated in Oshawa prior to the formation of Oshawa Transit in 1960:

- Oshawa Railway Company (operated by Canadian National Railway) 1895–1959
- Queen Bus Lines 1920s

=== Oshawa Transit ===
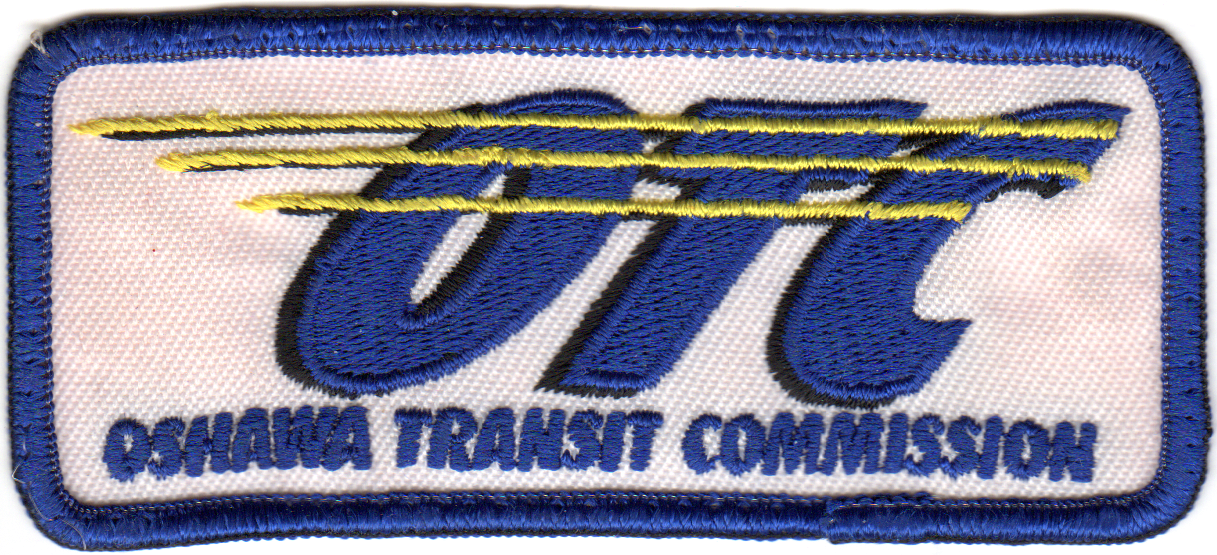
OTC Patch worn on mechanics' uniforms

Beginning with the change-over from CNR to Oshawa PUC in 1960, Oshawa Transit drivers and inspectors were required to wear a military-style tunic and cap. Over time, this uniform dress code became more relaxed: tunics became optional in the mid-1980s, but were still worn by many drivers after that. The cap, which had the driver's identification badge attached, no longer had to be worn by the on-duty drivers after the mid-1970s. Drivers were only required to keep the hat nearby for ID purposes.

In 1979, with the introduction of the clip-on ID badge system, the old-style caps were rendered obsolete. However, many veteran drivers continued using the caps until retirement.

Harvey Bodashefsky behind the wheel of a bus

=== Bus "Roadeo" ===
The first Oshawa Bus Roadeo was held at the Oshawa Centre in 1975. It continued throughout most of the 1980s. The last Roadeo was held in 1992 when Oshawa Transit competed with the Whitby, Ajax, and Pickering transit agencies in a regional Roadeo.

The Roadeo consisted of drivers safely driving a 40-foot (12.19-metre) bus through an obstacle course. At the end of the course, the bus had to be navigated through a row of barrels with only inches to spare before coming to a complete stop as close as possible to the finish line. The entire course was timed, and a time limit applied to the completion of each obstacle. Obstacles included simulated passenger stops, left dual turn, right rear dual clearance, offset street, right hand reverse, diminishing clearance and judgement stops.

In 1989 Harvey Bodashefsky won the Oshawa Roadeo and travelled to Ottawa to participate in the national event where he placed third in Canada.

=== Timeline ===
- October 2, 1959 - PUC agrees to operate bus service
- December 4, 1959 - Reginald Smith hired as first Superintendent
- January 2, 1960 - PUC takes over Oshawa Transit
- March 25, 1968 - Oshawa bus fleets expands to 32
- October 4, 1968 - Bus service expands to Oshawa Centre and Civic Auditorium
- April 15, 1972 - 5 buses equipped with 2-way radio system
- March 27, 1974 - Cal Cathmoir is named new Superintendent of Oshawa Transit
- January 15, 1976 - Transit extension to Whitby being studied
- January 26, 1979 - Western Flyer awarded Oshawa tender
- September 25, 1988 - Oshawa hires first female bus driver
- December 11, 1991 - Doors open in Oshawa for regional transit bid
- June 1992 - Oshawa Centre Bus Terminal opens. It is the first major route change in 20 years (buses no longer 'meet' downtown Oshawa with it being their 'central point'-- it is now the Oshawa Centre.)
- June 1996 - City of Oshawa takes control of transit service from PUC, forming the Oshawa Transit Commission
- September 2000 - Taunton route begins operations, serving Durham College and the city's growing northeast end
- November 2004 - Major service expansion includes new Taunton/Rossland route, operated jointly with Whitby Transit
- February 2005 - Durham Region council votes to merge all transit systems into new Durham Region Transit effective January 2006

Year	# of buses	Fare	Employees
1960	21	$0.15	39
1972	29	$0.35	50
1985	39	$1.30	85
1996	43	$1.60	100
2005	50	$2.00	128

== Fleet, routes and fares ==
Oshawa Transit bus numbers started with bus number 51, the General Motors TGH-3102 in 1960, and ended with two 2005 Nova Bus "Low Floor" model LFS 40102 buses assigned numbers 169 and 170 before Oshawa Transit became a part of Durham Region Transit.

=== Fleet ===
PUC bus 56, a 1960 GMC TGH3102, was the first Oshawa Transit bus to have a full body advertisement. The advertisement was painted on as part of the bus paint scheme, predating the vinyl body wraps of later years. It was for Certified Heating Co. Later buses would include painted advertisements for Crush, 7 Up, and Pepsi and were known as the "Pop" buses.

In 1996 Oshawa Transit purchased five used 1981 General Motors T8H-5308A buses from Denver Regional Transit and assigned them bus numbers 146 thru 150. The Denver Regional Transit buses were distinct, aside from their higher bus numbers on older GMC buses within Oshawa Transit's fleet, in that they had the retrofitted air conditioning unit on the roof when they were purchased whereas the Oshawa Transit GMC buses of the same make did not. The newly acquired Denver Regional Transit buses also lacked a small window between the front doors and the first opening passenger window. This might have been due to the needed reinforcement of the body structure to hold the extra weight of the Air Conditioning units on the roof.

Soon after, Oshawa Transit was taken over by the OTC. The paint colour flag on the face and rear side of all new and refurbished buses was changed from the yellow and blue stripe of the bus to the forward-leaning OTC logo.

In 2003 a computer mouse pad was issued showcasing two new buses in the Oshawa Transit fleet while promoting the newly opened University of Ontario Institute of Technology. The destination signs on the mouse pad buses read: "Ontario Institute of Technology" and "Durham College" respectively (Nova 152 and Nova 151).

After bus 112, a 1977 GMC model, was refurbished and put back into service, it showcased Oshawa's heritage on its interior and exterior. Various historic photograph reproductions were displayed on the interior with a historical mural painted on the exterior of the bus. Sound speakers and a radio were installed inside the bus and during its service, mostly along the 1 Simcoe route, it played the broadcast from Oshawa's CKGE-FM, known as Magic@94.9 at that time. The "1 Simcoe" (and later 1 Simcoe South/1 Simcoe North) route was the main north–south line (2 King and 2 Bond was the main east–west line). After retirement, bus 112 was displayed on the front yard of the Oshawa Transit garage as the Mural Bus, where it stood until sometime in mid to late 2012 before being removed from the property.

Bus 156, a 2002 Nova LFS, was the first bus with a full body vinyl wrap ad. The advertisement was for the Gordon Biersch brewery and restaurant located in Whitby. Because of the ad it was often referred to as "The Beer Bus" and made its way onto page 5 of "The End of an Era" along with a photo and the nickname.

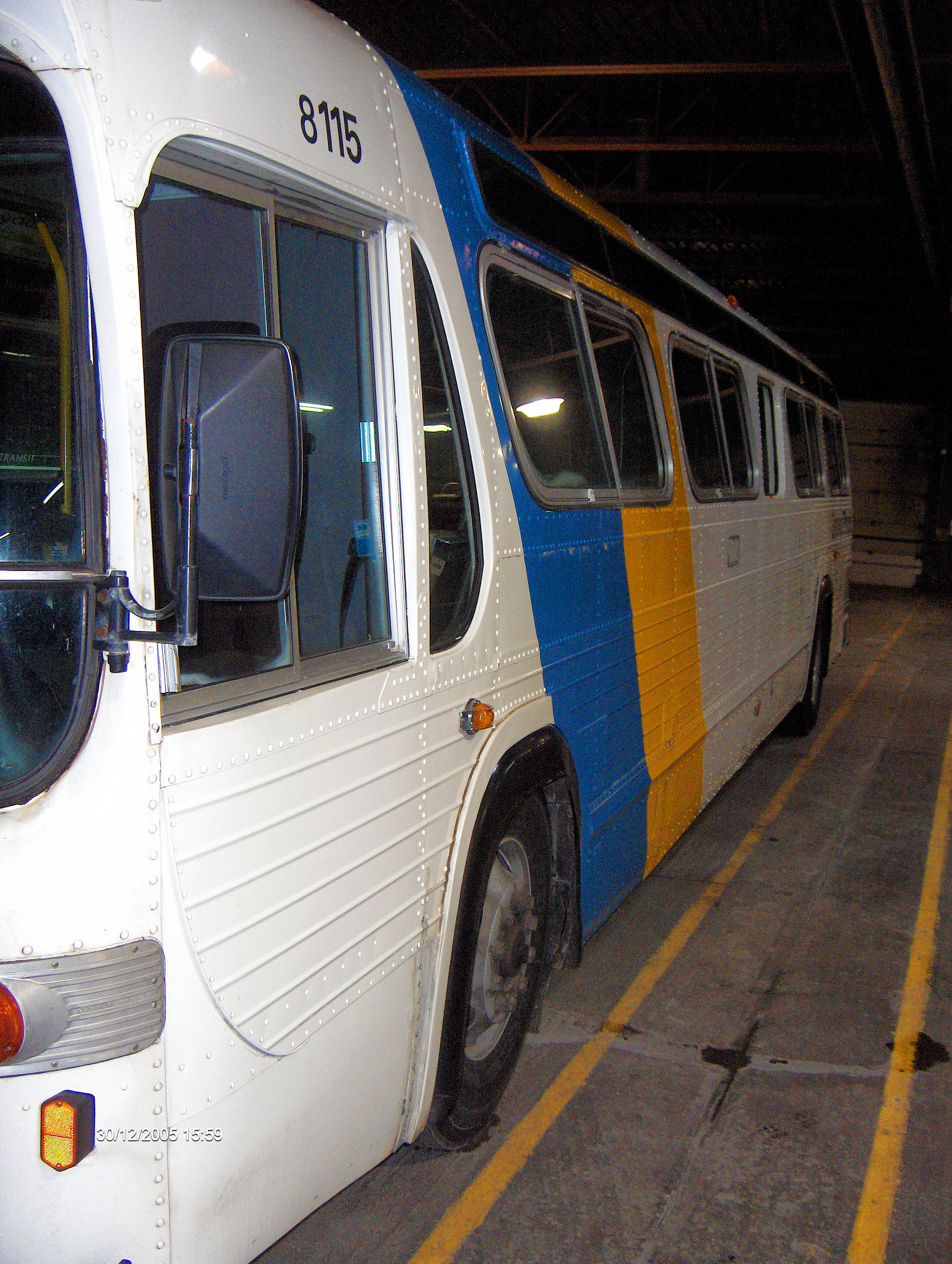
Oshawa Transit bus 115

With the creation of Durham Region Transit, all Oshawa Transit buses were reassigned bus numbers with the addition of an 8 before their original number designation, thus bus 1xx became bus 81xx.

=== Routes ===
- 1 Simcoe
- 2/2A King
- 3/3B Park
- 4 Bloor (Service Terminated 2004)
- 4A College Hill
- 5 Central Park
- 6/6B Dean
- 7/7B Ritson
- 8 Rossland (Renamed 8 Stevenson after 2006)
- 9/9B Thornton
- 10 Olive Harmony
- 11 Grandview
- 12 Adelaide
- 13 Go Shuttle
- 14 Community Bus
- 15 Taunton (Merged To 15-17 Taunton Route In 2004)
- 15/15B Taunton East (After 2004)
- 16/16B Rossland West (After 2004)
- 17/17B Taunton West (After 2004)
- 18/18B Rossland East (After 2004)

Routes 2 King and 9 Thornton became wheelchair accessible shortly after June 2005.

denotes fully accessible service

=== Fares ===
Prior to its dissolution these were the Oshawa Transit fares.

	Adult	Student	Child	Senior
Cash Fare	$2.00	$1.75	$1.25	$0.50
Monthly Pass	$70.00	$62.00	$42.00	$42.00
10 Ride Card	$19.00	$16.75	$11.85	n/a

The 10 Ride Card was the same size as regular monthly pass (the size of a credit card) and a hole was punched by the bus driver in one of the designated 10 spaces upon initial boarding. A transfer would be issued on request to allow continuous travel on other routes within the system until the time specified on the transfer.

As there were only two Catholic secondary schools in Oshawa (Monsignor John Pereyma and Monsignor Paul Dwyer) a Restricted Student monthly pass was issued through these secondary schools to students residing outside a set boundary from within the closest school. Initially it was a regular student pass allowing unlimited travel at any time, but in an effort to save costs to the school board in the late 1990s Oshawa Transit began offering the Restricted Student pass. Similar to the regular student pass it allowed unlimited transportation on the Oshawa Transit system, but its use was restricted from the hours of 07:00 thru 19:00, Monday thru Friday. A new pass was issued each month for the duration of the school year. The pass had a yellowed background to help distinguish it from the other passes with the word "Restricted" above the Student mark on the pass and the conditions of its use printed on the back.

Children under 5 years of age rode free.

== End of an era ==
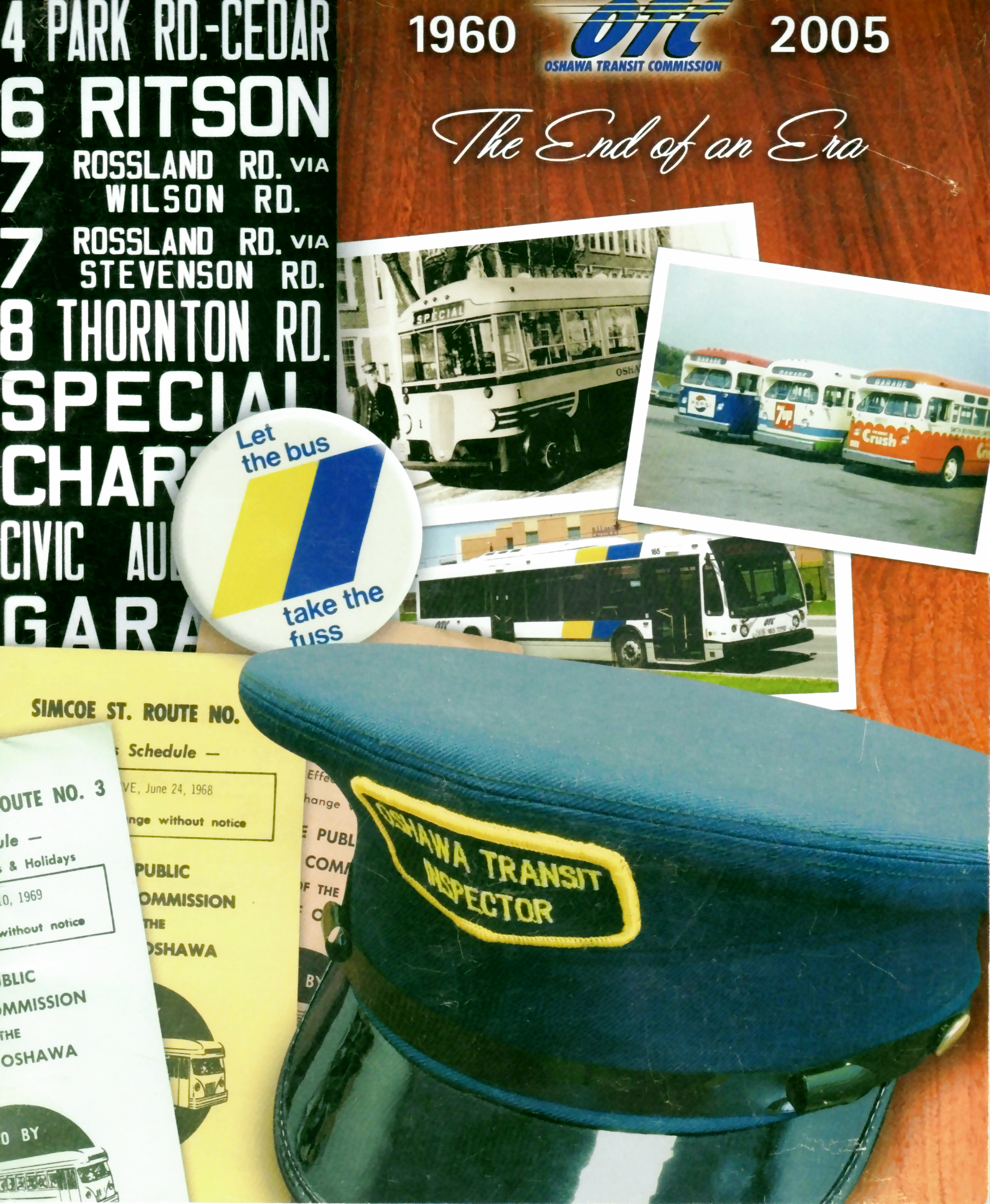
Oshawa Transit - The End of an Era booklet issued to employees.

In mid 2005 Oshawa Transit buses started getting a makeover with the new black and green stripes as well as the Durham Regional Transit decals in preparation for the new changeover to Durham Region Transit. By autumn many new and refurbished buses already had the "8" designation, marking the new Durham Region numbering system. It was common to see buses with the old three and the new four digit numbers operating in service as Oshawa Transit buses.

In 2006 staff at the former Oshawa Transit garage received a booklet titled "The End of an Era". The booklet illustrates the history of Oshawa Transit and includes photographs of the many different model buses used throughout the years with a write-up of memories of retired staff and the "Bus Roadeo". It features a double page inside photo, taken in 2005, of the active and retired Oshawa Transit staff standing at the rear of the Oshawa Transit garage in front of five buses with destination signs reading (left to right): "1 Simcoe", "OSHAWA TRANSIT", "1960-2005", "END OF AN ERA", and "2 King". There was a limited printing of this booklet and not all employees received one.

As of its dissolution at the end of 2005, Oshawa Transit operated 43 buses on 19 routes:

- Orion Bus Industries Orion 01.508
- Ontario Bus Industries Orion 05.501
- Flyer Industries D900
- General Motors Diesel Division Buses TGH-3102
- General Motors Diesel Division Buses TDH-3501
- General Motors Diesel Division Buses T6H-5307N
- General Motors Diesel Division Buses and Motor Coach Industries TC40-102N
- General Motors Diesel Division Buses T6H-4523N
- NovaBus LFS40-102

denotes wheelchair access

== 2023 Garage Fire ==
On August 16, 2023, a fire broke out in the former Oshawa Transit garage destroying bays 1 thru 6 and causing other damage including the loss of 19 DRT buses resulting in multiple route cancellations.
