= Pickering GO Station =

Railway station in Ontario, Canada

Pickering
- Pickering GO Station in 2026

General information
- Location: 1322 Bayly Street; Pickering, Ontario; Canada
- Coordinates: 43°49′50″N 79°05′06″W
- Owner: Metrolinx
- Platforms: 3 side platforms (train) loop with bays (bus)
- Tracks: 3
- Bus routes: 41 90 94
- Connections: Durham Region Transit

Construction
- Structure type: Station building and tunnels and elevators to platforms
- Parking: 2,508 spaces
- Cycle facilities: Yes
- Accessible: Yes

Other information
- Station code: GO Transit: PIN
- Fare zone: 91

History
- Opened: May 23, 1967; 59 years ago
- Electrified: December 2036; 10 years' time (planned)

Passengers
- 2018: 907,000

Services
Preceding station	GO Transit	Following station
Rouge Hill towards Union	Lakeshore East	Ajax towards Oshawa
Union Terminus	Lakeshore East (express)	Ajax towards Oshawa
Future services
Preceding station	GO Transit	Following station
Rouge Hill towards Union	Lakeshore East (planned expansion)	Ajax towards Bowmanville
Former services
Preceding station	Canadian National Railway	Following station
Port Union toward Sarnia	Grand Trunk Railway; Main Line	Whitby toward Montreal
Location

Pickering GO Station is a train and bus station in the GO Transit network located in Pickering, Ontario, Canada. It is a stop on the Lakeshore East line and was the eastern terminus from 1967 until 1990, when service was extended to Whitby and subsequently to Oshawa.

== History ==
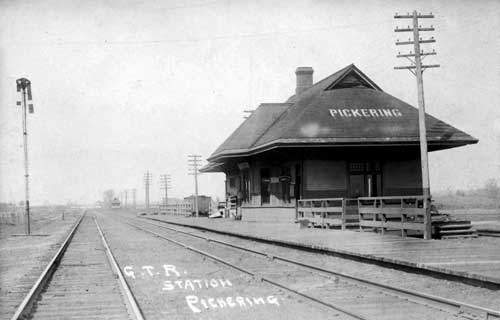
GTR station Pickering

The previous Pickering station, which had been constructed by Grand Trunk Railway in the early 1900s, had been about 2 kilometres east of the current location at Liverpool Road. Plans for the original GO Transit Lakeshore line called for commuter train service not to go beyond Liverpool Road where the CN York Subdivision tracks joined the CN Kingston Subdivision, because this would interfere with freight trains. No practical site could be found, but there was a large field south of the tracks on the east side of Liverpool Road with more than enough space to accommodate a station building, bus terminal and car parking, with convenient access from Bayly Street. Installation of a new crossover before the overpass at Liverpool Road was required to get to an existing industrial track, so that GO Trains standing at the station platform would be off the main line.

When the station opened in 1967 it was a key transfer point between train and bus services.

In 1990 the single platform was supplemented by two more platforms and tracks when GO Transit built a dedicated right-of-way on the north side of the Canadian National tracks. This was part of the project to expand Lakeshore East train service to Ajax and Whitby, and finally to a new terminus at the Oshawa Via Rail station in 1995.

== Station layout ==
=== Platforms ===
Pickering Pedestrian Bridge spanning railway tracks, Highway 401, and Pickering Parkway at Pickering GO Station

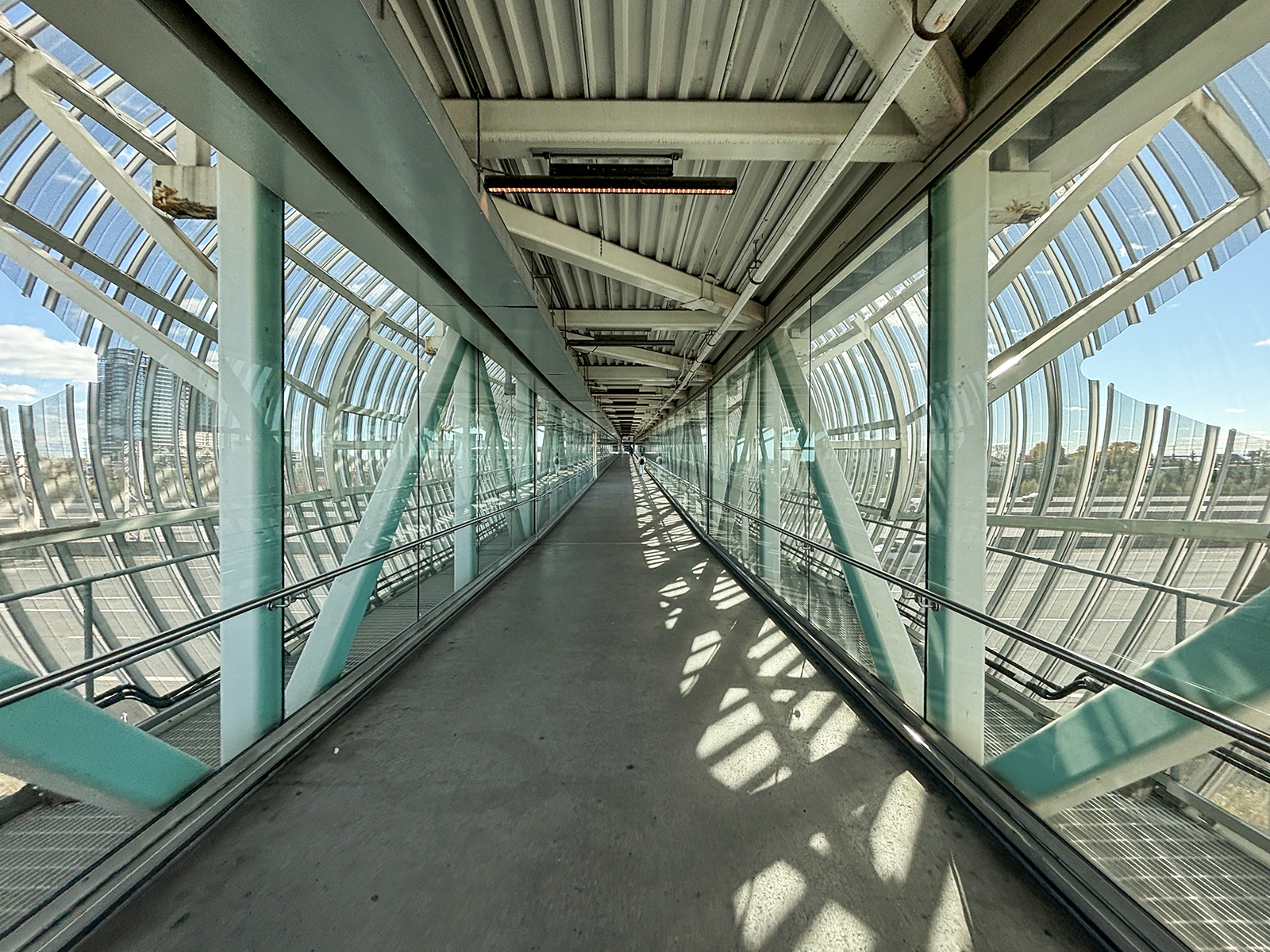
Pedestrian Bridge

Pickering has three platforms for trains, 1 and 2 which serve trains to Union and trains to Oshawa. Track 3, separated from the other tracks, is closest to the bus bays and station. Track 3 is the original track before the extension to Oshawa, and is no longer being used.

=== Pedestrian bridge ===
The Pickering Pedestrian Bridge was opened in 2012 between the GO station on its south side of the tracks and Pickering Town Centre, a shopping centre with access to regional bus service on the bridge's north side. The 250-metre (820 ft) enclosed bridge spans 6 railway tracks, the 14 lanes of Highway 401 and the two-lane Pickering Parkway, a municipal road. At night, the bridge is illuminated by 300 LED lights in rotating shades of lilac, purple, blue and teal. The bridge has received the City of Pickering’s 2019 Urban Design Award and the 2019 Engineering News Record Global Best Projects Award. In 2021, the bridge became a Guinness World Record holder for the longest enclosed pedestrian bridge in the world. Exterior cladding of the bridge in a metallic mesh proved to be problematic during construction and, along with severe weather, delayed its completion.

=== Parking ===
As of 2021, the station has three parking lots with respectively 585, 780 and 500 spaces plus a multi-level parking garage finished in 2013 or 2014 with 1673 spaces.

== Connecting bus routes ==
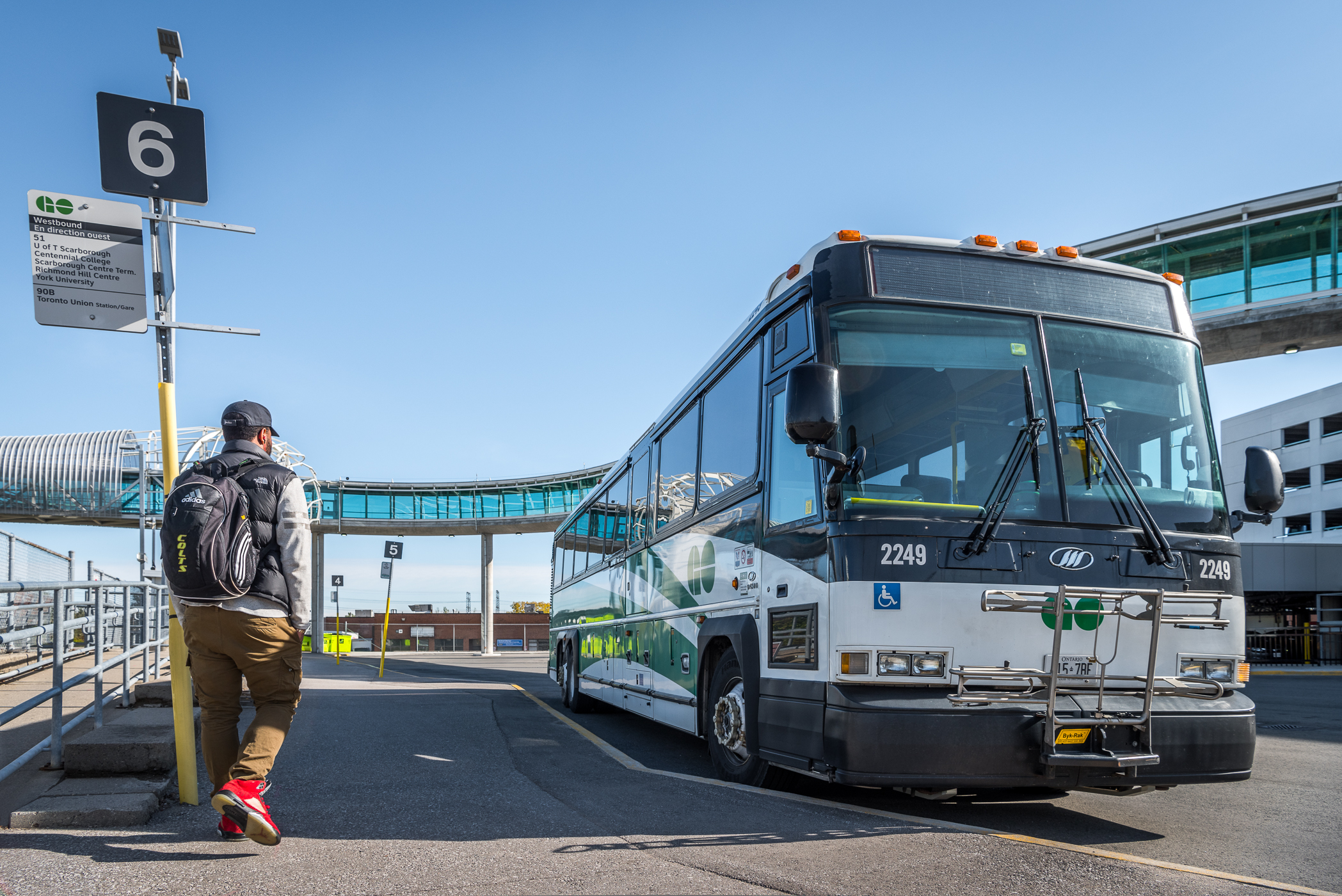
A passenger waiting to board a GO Transit bus at the Pickering GO Station

The station is the Pickering hub for Durham Region Transit local bus services, which evolved from the Bay Ridges Dial-a-Bus in 1970.

Durham Region Transit

- 112 to Taunton Road via Alexander Knox Road (Seaton)
- 118 to Taunton Road via Whites Road
- 121 to Pickering Parkway Terminal
- 121A to Pickering Parkway Terminal via Sunbird Trail
- 211 to Ajax Station
- PULSE 900B To Oshawa (Pickering Parkway Terminal)
- PULSE 916 to Harmony Terminal (Pickering Parkway Terminal)
- 917 to Oshawa Centre Terminal (Pickering Parkway Terminal)

GO Transit

- 41 - Hamilton/Pickering
- 90 - Lakeshore East Bus (early morning/late nights)
- 94 - Pickering/Square One via Pearson Airport
