= Ajax Transit =

Defunct public transit operator in Ajax, Ontario

Ajax Transit was a public transit operator in the Town of Ajax, Ontario, Canada. Ajax Transit and Pickering Transit were merged on September 4, 2001, to form the Ajax Pickering Transit Authority (APTA). APTA was merged into Durham Region Transit on January 1, 2006.

== Routes ==
The following routes were operated:

- Elm
- Duffins
- Beach
- Harwood
- Westney Heights
- Village
- Puckrin
- Applecroft
- Hospital
- Flag Bus

== History ==
In 1973, the Town of Ajax conducted a survey of potential transit ridership in Ajax. This led to bus service beginning in 1973, under a contract with Charterways Transportation Limited, which operated service using a fleet of school buses, with heaviest ridership between the Pickering Beach area and downtown Ajax.

In the late 1970s, public transit buses were acquired and began operations on the Elm, Duffins, and Beach routes, which exist to this day. In the early 1980s, the Harwood, Westney Heights, and Village routes began service. Service on the Puckrin route began in the late 1980s.

In 1985, Ajax built a new transit garage and offices near the location of the Ajax GO Station. This location was ideal as Ajax Transit's routes all operated from the Ajax GO Station, providing a service that was tightly coordinated with the Lakeshore East train service of GO Transit. This facility remains in use as the 'DRT West' facility of Durham Region Transit, and DRT's Ajax routes continue to operate from the GO Station.

In 1991, Ajax Transit implemented a smart card fare system. This system allowed riders to use stored-value cards to access transit services. This system was eliminated in 2001 with the formation of the Ajax Pickering Transit Authority. However, this system was very forward looking and foreshadowed the forthcoming Presto card, in which Ajax Transit's descendant Durham Region Transit will be a participant.

In 1992, Ajax town council authorized implementation of a town-operated transit system to replace the contracted services. Also in 1992, Ajax Transit introduced Flag Bug service in which cutaway vans could be flagged down at any point on a fixed route.

Durham Region Transit's Ajax operations remain heavily based on those operated by Ajax Transit.

== See also ==
- Presto card
