= Oshawa Centre =

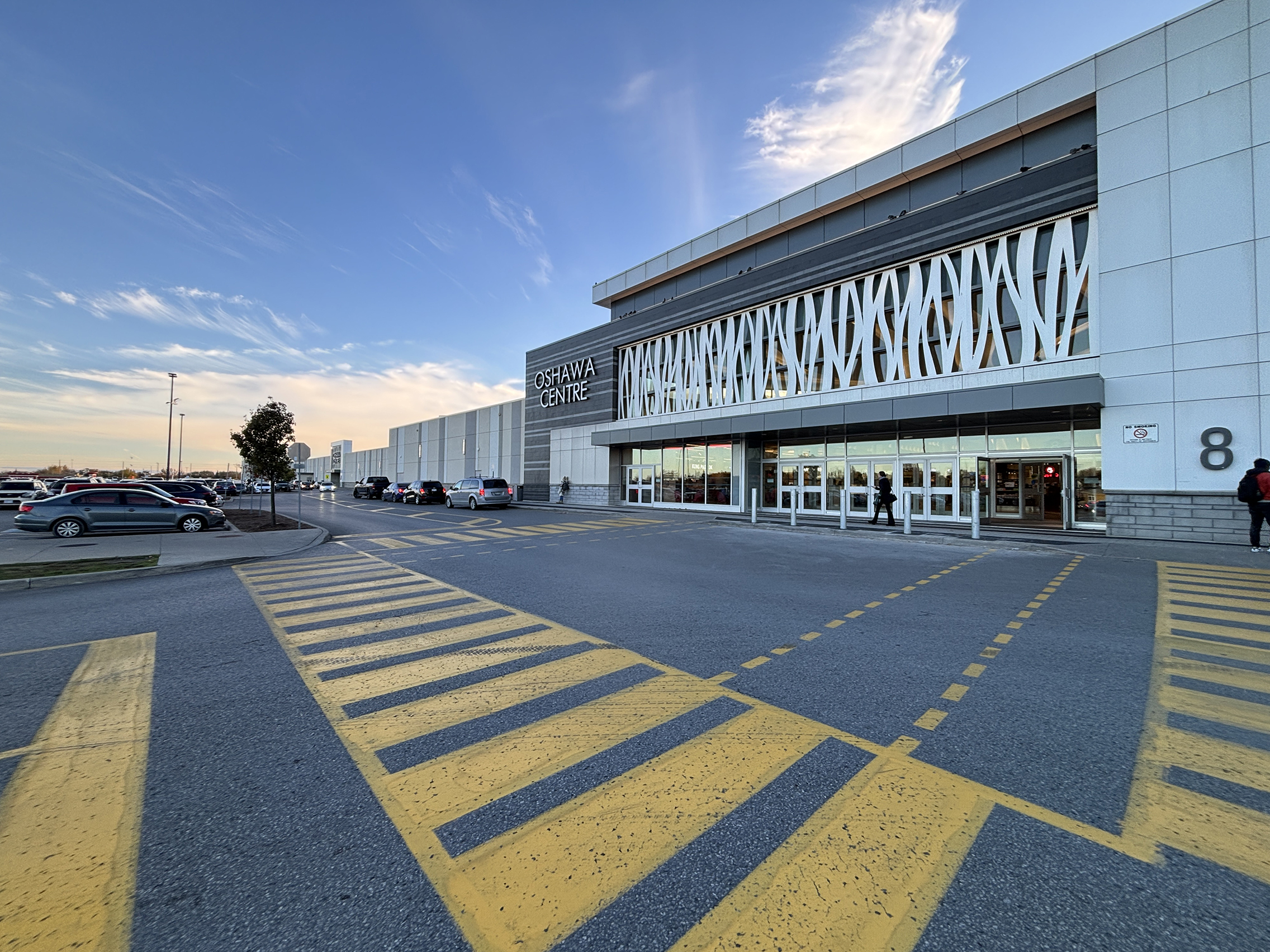
- Oshawa Centre Entrance 8
- Coordinates: 43.88998°N 78.87935°W
- Address: 419 King Street West; Oshawa, Ontario; L1J 2K5
- Opened: 1956
- Manager: Primaris REIT
- Owner: Primaris REIT
- Num. of stores: 230
- Num. of anchor tenants: 10
- Floor area: 1,219,962 sq ft (113,338.2 m^{2})
- Floors: 2
- Parking: 250
- Website: www.oshawacentre.com

Oshawa Centre is a two-storey shopping mall located in the city of Oshawa, Ontario, Canada. Located at King Street and Stevenson Road, it is the largest mall in Durham Region and the largest in Ontario east of Toronto with over 230 retail stores and public services. Its Executive Office complex includes the Ministry of Health of Ontario.

The Oshawa Centre is owned and managed by Primaris REIT. One of Durham Region Transit's bus terminals is located outside of the mall's south-east entrance, from which there are regular bus services to Oshawa GO Station, Whitby GO Station, and the campuses of Durham College, among other destinations.

== History ==
The shopping mall opened as a shopping plaza in 1956 and was enclosed in 1968.

Ivanhoé Cambridge had the grand opening of the CA$230 million renovated and expanded a portion of the mall on September 29, 2016. The renovation and expansion project began in the summer of 2013 which included 60 additional stores within the mall. In 2014, Zellers was torn down to make room for what is now parking space. The former 1950s-themed food court was replaced with a new 1000-seat food court. The food court was relocated to the east section of the mall, in the new addition.

Primaris REIT acquires Oshawa Centre along with 50% interest in Southgate Centre in 2025.

Former large retailers at Oshawa Centre included:

- Eaton's (closed down in the mid-90s)
- Famous Players (closed down when a new Cineplex theatre opened in North Oshawa)
- Mark's Work Wearhouse (Moved across the street beside the Canadian Tire)
- Sears (closed in 2018 with the liquidation of Sears Canadian operations)— Demolition began in January 2026 and finished in August to make space for future development.
- Zellers (closed and torn down due to renovation) and was originally supposed to be a new Target store, but never came to fruition.
- Hudson's Bay (closed in 2025 due to the Hudson's Bay Company's liquidation of stores and bankruptcy in 2025)-Vacant

The former Westmount Public School, a heritage building built in 1925, was acquired in 1988 and was demolished in September 2018 to make way for the mall's future expansion.

== Gallery ==
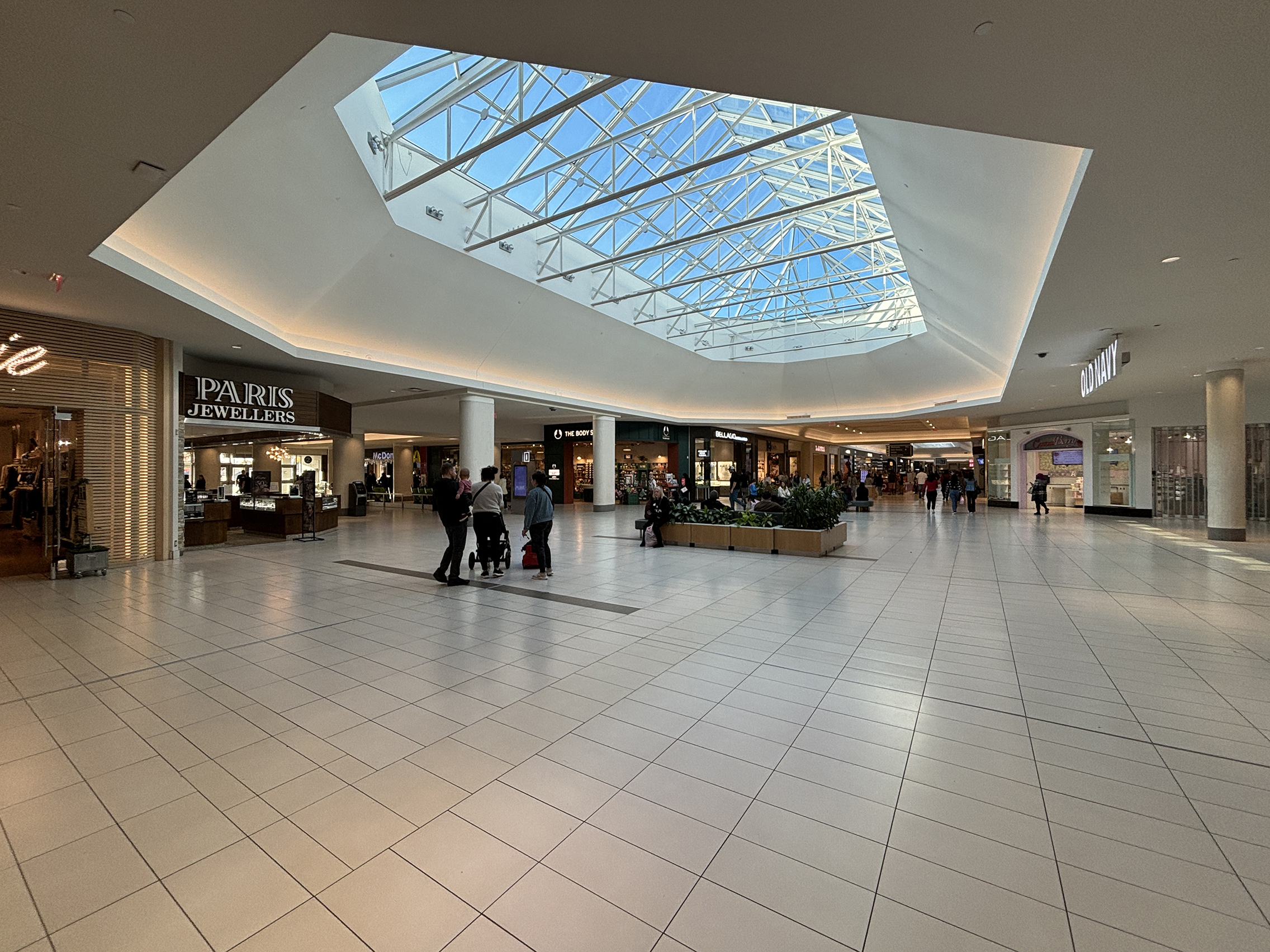
Mall Atrium

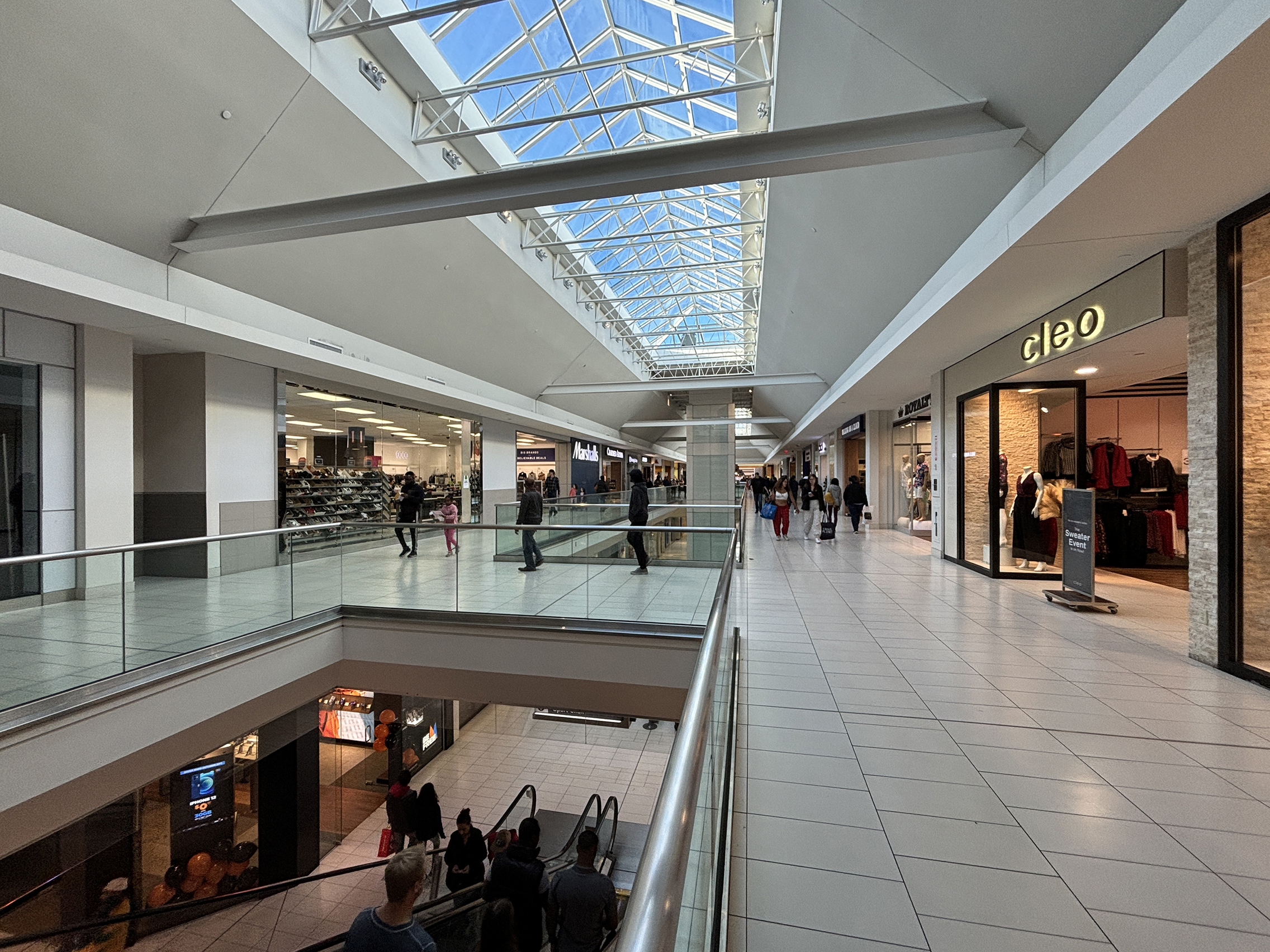
Mall interior

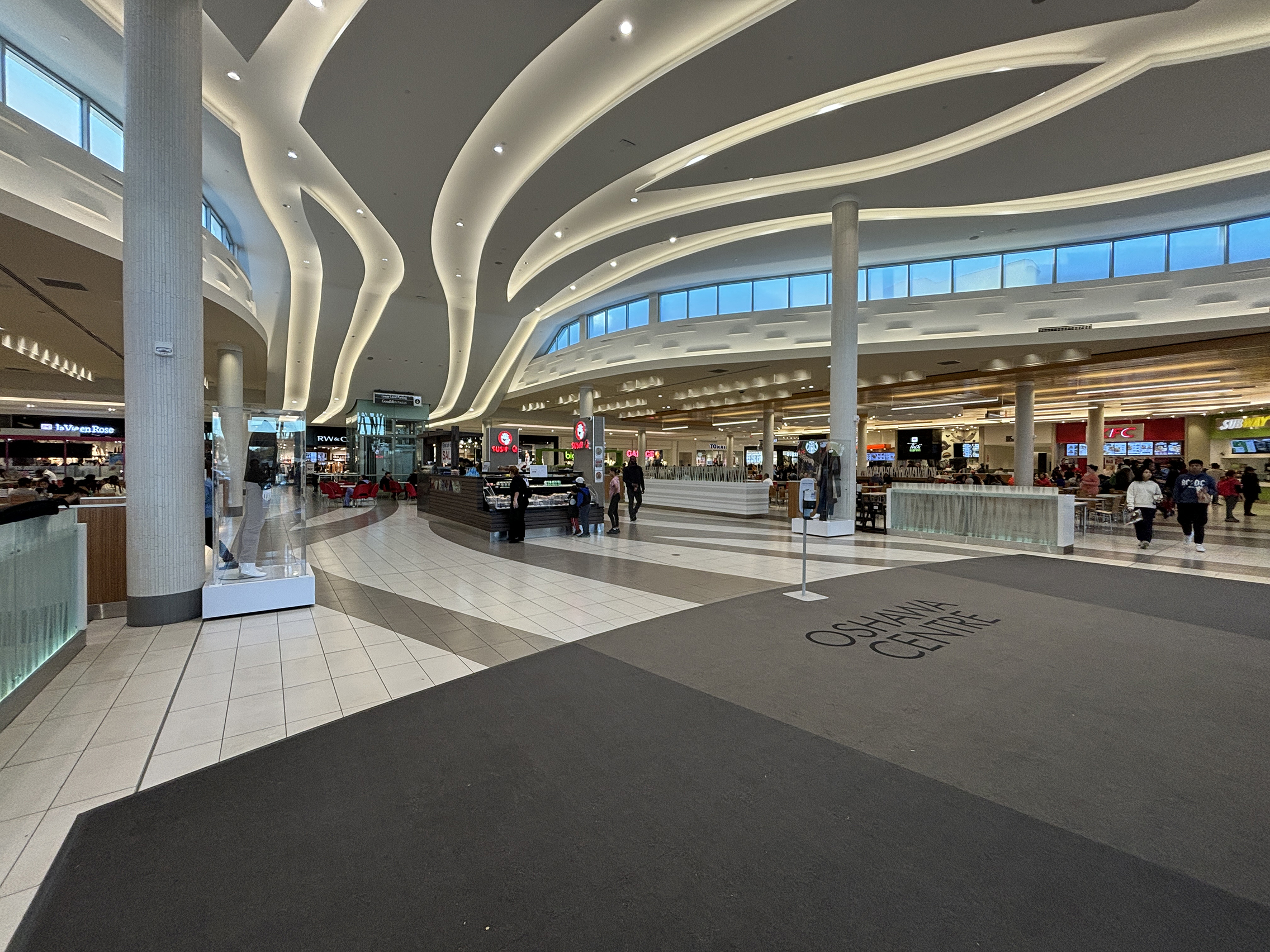
Food Court

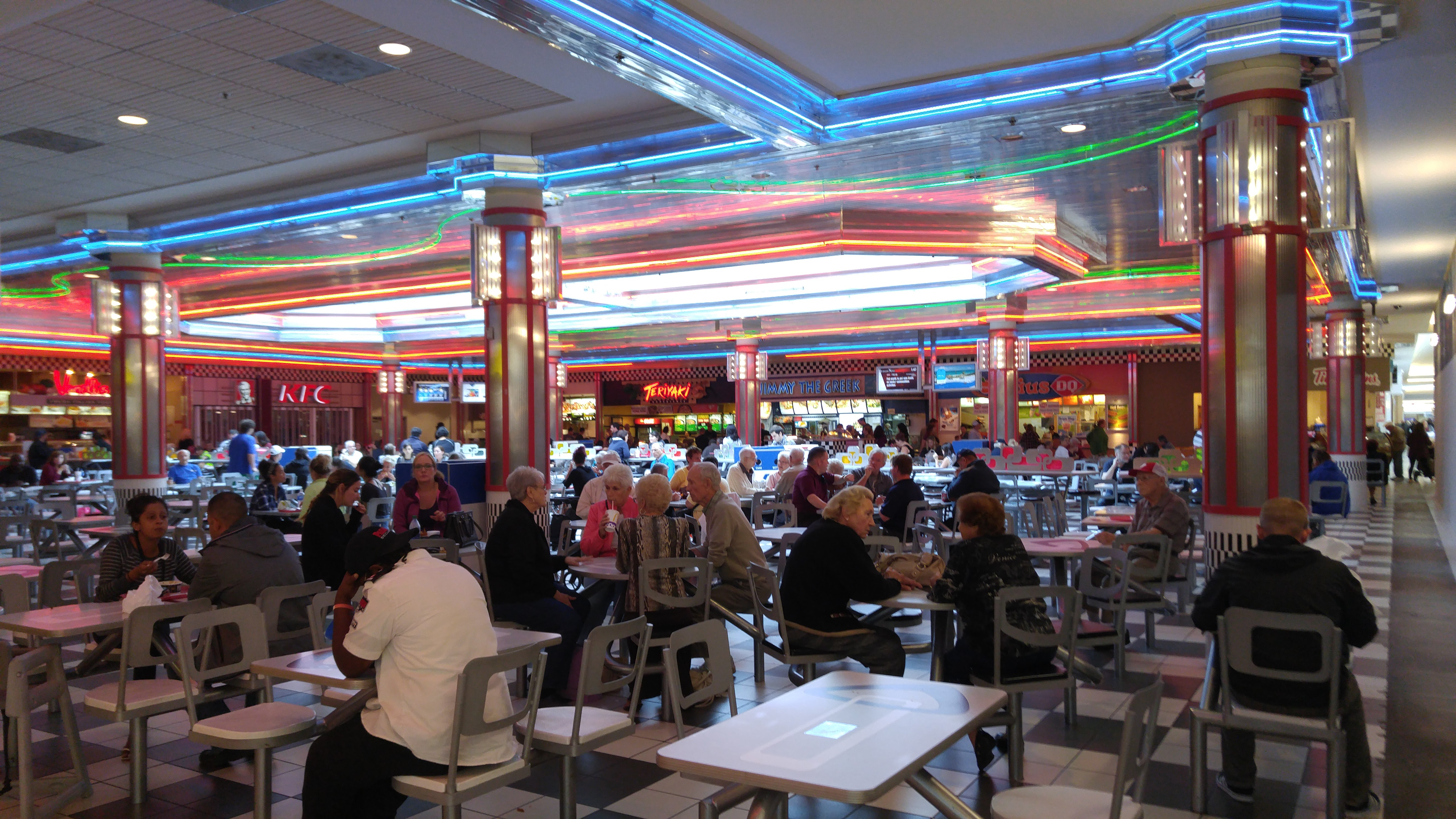
Former Food Court before renovation in 2016

== See also ==
- List of largest enclosed shopping malls in Canada
