= Ajax GO Station =

Railway station in Ontario, Canada

Ajax
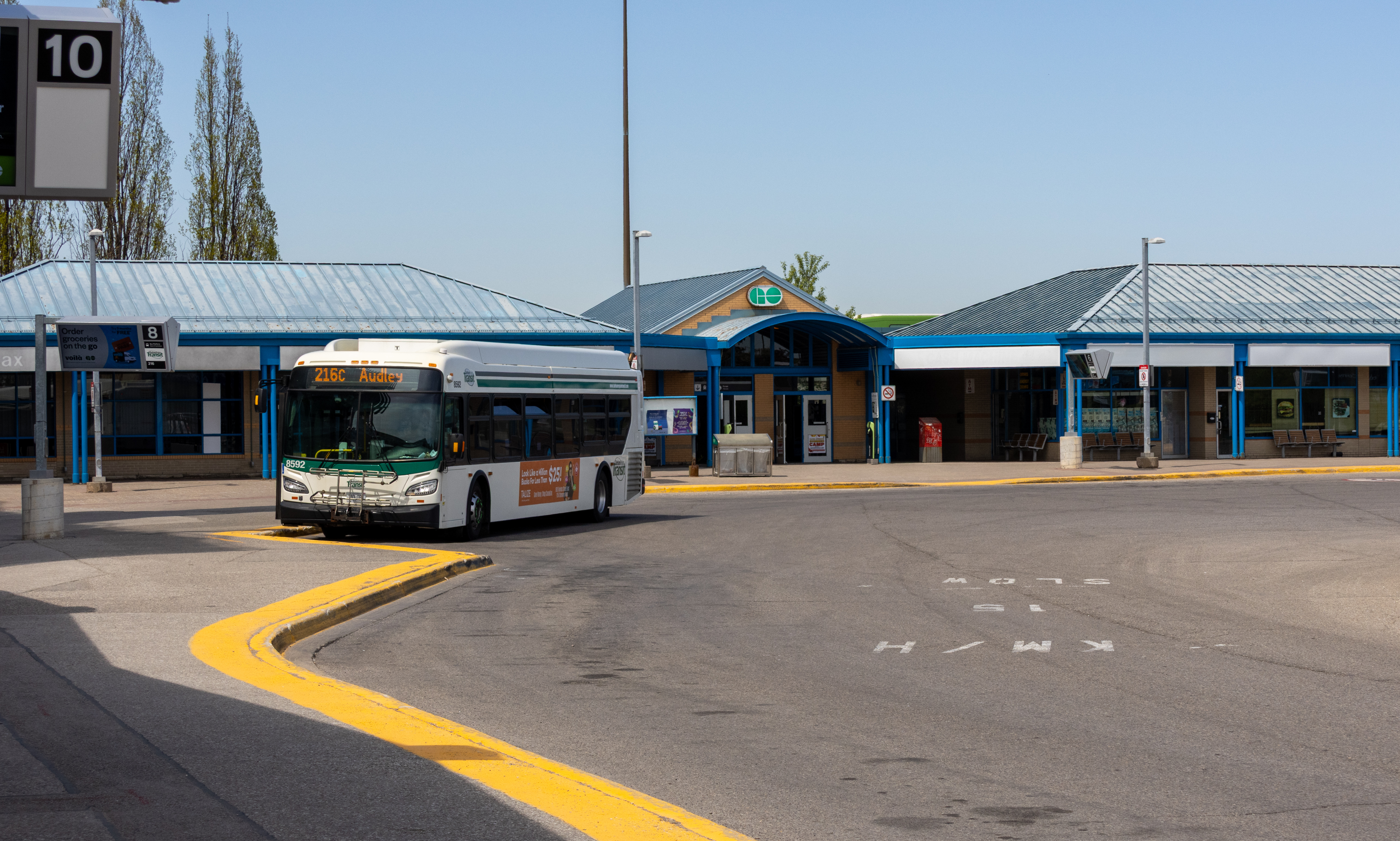

General information
- Location: 100 Westney Road South; Ajax, Ontario; Canada
- Coordinates: 43°50′52″N 79°02′29″W
- Owner: Metrolinx
- Platforms: 1 island platform
- Tracks: 2
- Bus routes: 90 96B
- Connections: Durham Region Transit

Construction
- Structure type: Station building with tunnel and elevator access to train platform
- Parking: 2,148 spaces
- Cycle facilities: Yes
- Accessible: Yes

Other information
- Station code: GO Transit: AJ
- Fare zone: 92

History
- Opened: December 4, 1988; 37 years ago
- Electrified: December 2036; 10 years' time (planned)

Passengers
- 2018: 907,000

Services
Preceding station	GO Transit	Following station
Pickering towards Union	Lakeshore East	Whitby towards Oshawa
Future services
Preceding station	GO Transit	Following station
Pickering towards Union	Lakeshore East (planned expansion)	Whitby towards Bowmanville
Location

Ajax GO Station is a train and bus station in the GO Transit network located in Ajax, Ontario, Canada. It is a stop on the Lakeshore East line and on the Oshawa/Finch Express bus route. The train platforms lie along the south side of Highway 401 with access to the station from Westney Road at Fairall Street.

A multi-level parking structure opened in 2013.

== Connecting bus service ==
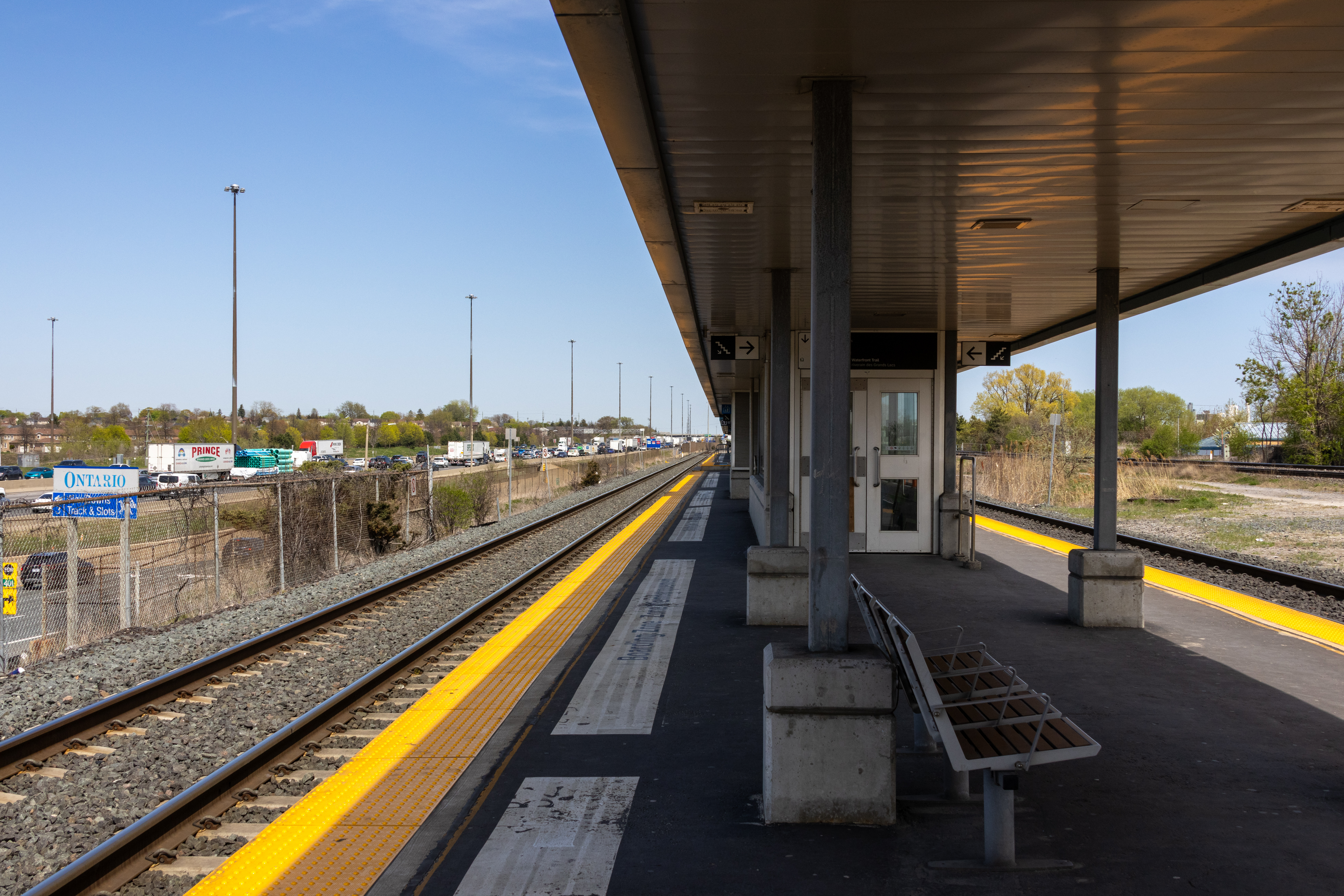
Station platform in 2025

The station is the Ajax hub for Durham Region Transit (DRT), with most routes timed to connect with GO Train services. DRT's West Operational Facility, originally built for Ajax Transit, is on the south side of the station.

Durham Region Transit routes

- 211 to Pickering Parkway Terminal
- 216 to Taunton Road via Harwood Avenue
- 216C to Audley Recreation Centre via Harwood Avenue
- 224 to Harwood/Taunton via Salem Road
- 227A/B to South Ajax
- PULSE 915 to Harmony Terminal via Westney Road/Taunton Road
- 917 to Pickering Parkway Terminal (west) & Oshawa Centre Terminal (east)

GO Transit routes

- 90 - Oshawa/Union Station Bus Terminal (early morning/late night bus)
- 96 - Oshawa/Finch Express Bus
