= Mississauga Truck and Bus Collision =

Mississauga Truck and Bus Collision is a rebuilder of buses and trucks in Southern Ontario. Located in Milton, Ontario, MTB has done work for various transit authorities in Ontario, Canada and the United States. MTB also rebuilds and resells second hand buses to other agencies:

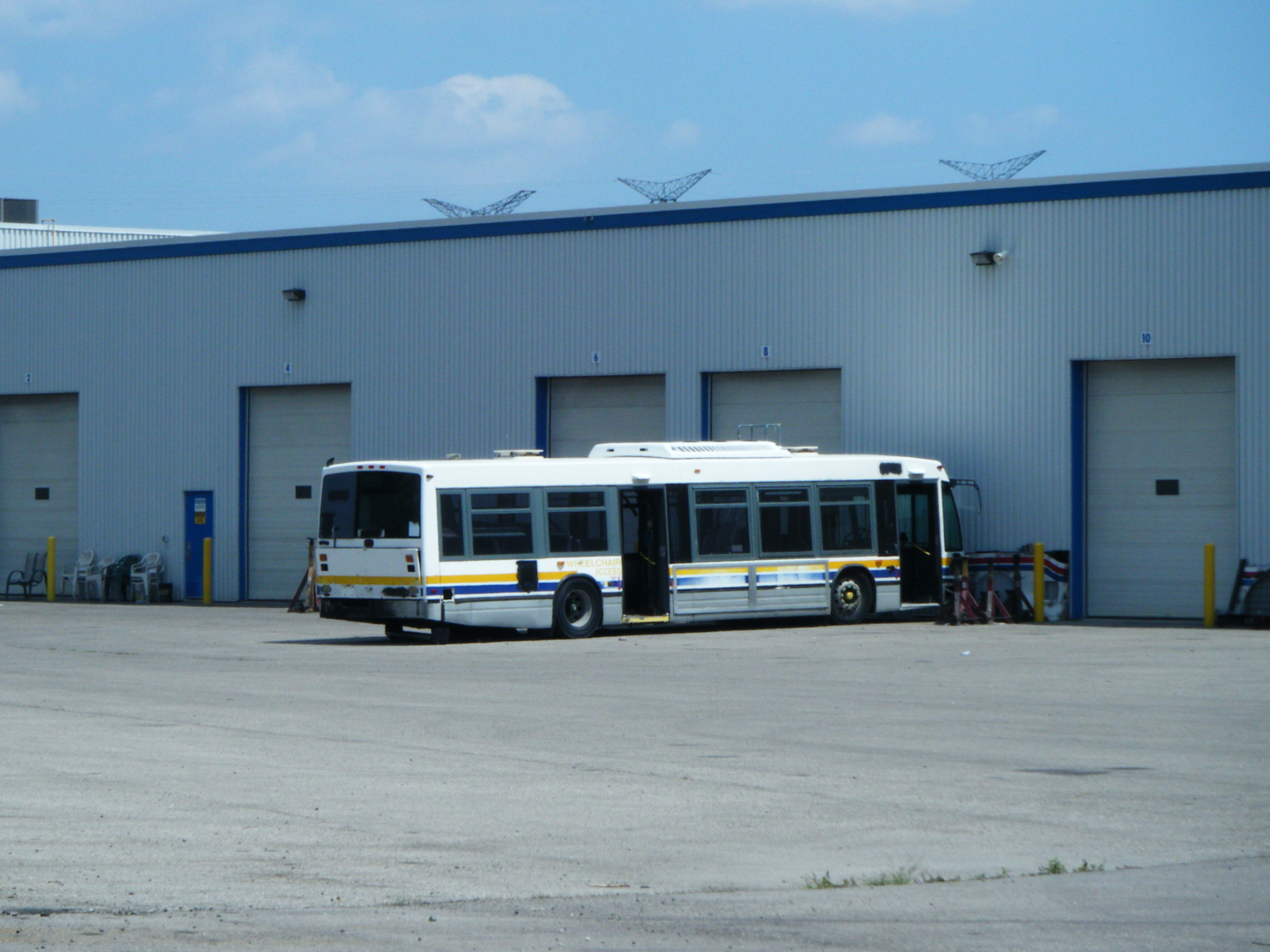
A Hamilton Street Railway Nova Bus LFS at MTB possibly being stripped for parts or will be rebuilt and resold.

- Toronto Transit Commission - CNG bus rebuilds and conversion to diesel
- Ajax Pickering Transit Authority
- Mississauga Transit
- Barrie Transit

MTB rebuilds bus and trucks damaged by collisions, fires and other sources of damage. MTB also made Glider kits to agencies using license versions of existing buses builders, such as Orion Bus Industries.

== Products ==
- MTB Glider kit buses (No longer in production)

== See also ==
- Dupont Trolley Industries
