= Pickering Transit =

Defunct public transit operator in Pickering, Ontario

- Industry: Public Transport
- Founded: 1973; 53 years ago
- Defunct: September 4, 2001
- Fate: Merged to form Ajax Pickering Transit Authority
- Headquarters: Pickering, Ontario, Canada

Pickering Transit was a Canadian public transit operator in the City of Pickering, Ontario.

== History ==
Transit service in Pickering began with the Bay Ridges Dial-A-Bus, which ran from July 1970 to January 1973 as a demonstration project conducted by the Government of Ontario. Local GO fixed route supplementary service was introduced in February 1972.

Transit service was taken over by the municipality with the creation of Pickering Transit in 1973.

Pickering Transit and Ajax Transit were merged on September 4, 2001 to form the Ajax Pickering Transit Authority. APTA was merged into Durham Region Transit on January 1, 2006. DRT's Pickering operations remain heavily based on those operated by Pickering Transit.

== Routes ==
The following routes were operated:

- Route 1 Industrial
- Route 2 Liverpool
- Route 2A Village east
- Route 3 Amberlea
- Route 4 Glendale (a.m rush)
- Route 5 West Shore
- Route 5A Lookout Point
- Route 6 Bay Ridges
- Route 7 Rosebank
- Route 9 Port Union Go
- Route 10 Ajax
- Route 11 Finch/Hwy 2 (a.m rush)
- Route 11A Hwy 2/Finch (p.m rush)
- Route 12 Brock Rd
- Route 12A Brock rd/ Village East (weekends)
- Route 14 Maple Ridge/ Glendale (p.m rush)
- Route 4/14A Maple Ridge/ Glendale (weekends)
- Highbush
