= Whitby Transit =

Whitby Transit was a public transit agency in the Town of Whitby, Ontario, Canada from 1980 to 2006. It was merged with the other public transit agencies in Durham Region on January 1, 2006, to form Durham Region Transit.

== History ==
Previous transit operators include:

- Charterways Transportation Limited

In 1980 the system was transferred to town ownership with operations contracted to Charterways Transportation.

== Operations ==
WT routes were:

Route	Name	Notes
1	Otter Creek/West Lynde	no weekend service
2	Brock St./GO Station/Whitby Shores/Hospitals	
3	Garden	no weekend service
4	Anderson	no weekend service
5	Thickson & Garrard	
6	White Oaks/Oshawa Centre	
15 & 16	15 Taunton East/16 Rossland West	
17 & 18	17 Taunton West/18 Rossland East	
	Evening Service shuttle	
	Dial-a-Ride Area	to GO Transit stations
