= Charterways Transportation Limited =

Bus operator in Ontario, Canada

Charterways Transportation Limited was a bus operator in Ontario, Canada. The head office was located in London Ontario.

Of particular note:

- It was one of a few sub-contractors to GO Transit during GO's early years.
- It also operated municipal transit in Ajax, Ontario, from 1969 to 1973. Service was provided using a fleet of school buses, with heaviest ridership between the Pickering Beach area and downtown Ajax.
- Trial transit operator in Whitby in 1976, then as contractor for Whitby Transit up to the early 1990s

The Company owned National School Bus Company which operated school bus, paratransit and municipal transit in the mid-west and north-eastern United States. Charterways was acquired and absorbed into Laidlaw's transit operations in August 1996.
