= Whitby GO Station =

Railway station in Whitby, Ontario, Canada

Whitby
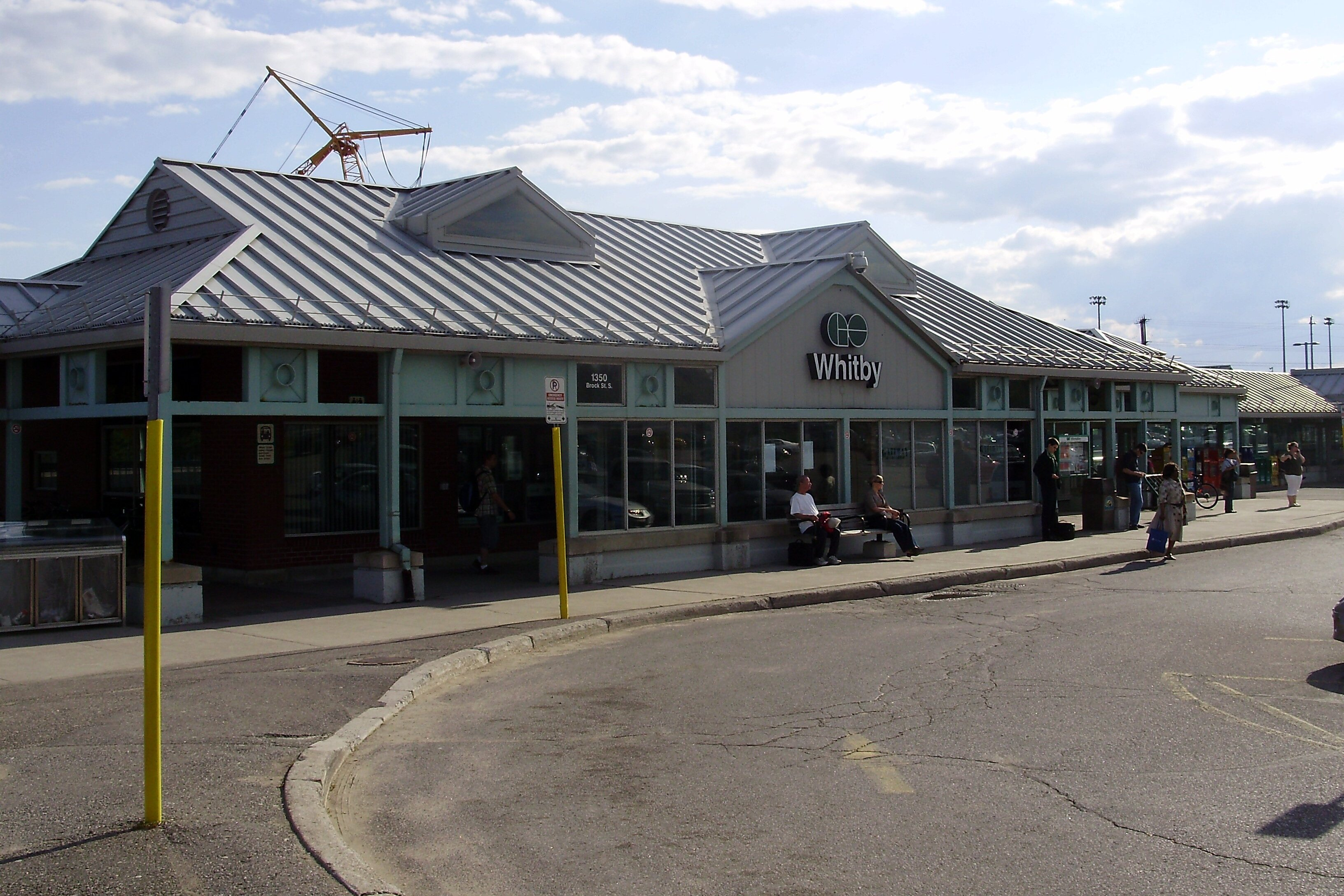

General information
- Location: 1350 Brock Street South; Whitby, Ontario; Canada
- Coordinates: 43°51′54″N 78°56′17″W
- Owner: Metrolinx
- Platforms: 1 island platform
- Tracks: 2
- Bus routes: 90 96B
- Connections: Durham Region Transit; Megabus

Construction
- Parking: 2,958 spaces
- Cycle facilities: Yes
- Accessible: Yes

Other information
- Station code: GO Transit: WH
- Fare zone: 93

History
- Opened: December 4, 1988; 37 years ago
- Electrified: December 2036; 10 years' time (planned)

Passengers
- 2018: 1,000,000

Services
| Preceding station | GO Transit | Following station |
|---|---|---|
| Ajax towards Union | Lakeshore East | Oshawa Terminus |
Future services
| Preceding station | GO Transit | Following station |
|---|---|---|
| Ajax towards Union | Lakeshore East (planned expansion) | Oshawa towards Bowmanville |
Location

Whitby GO Station is a train and bus station in the GO Transit network in Whitby, Ontario, Canada. It is a stop on the Lakeshore East line and was the eastern terminus of the dedicated GO Transit right-of-way until those tracks were extended to Oshawa in 1995. There are connections by local Durham Region Transit routes within Whitby and Durham Region.

== Station layout ==
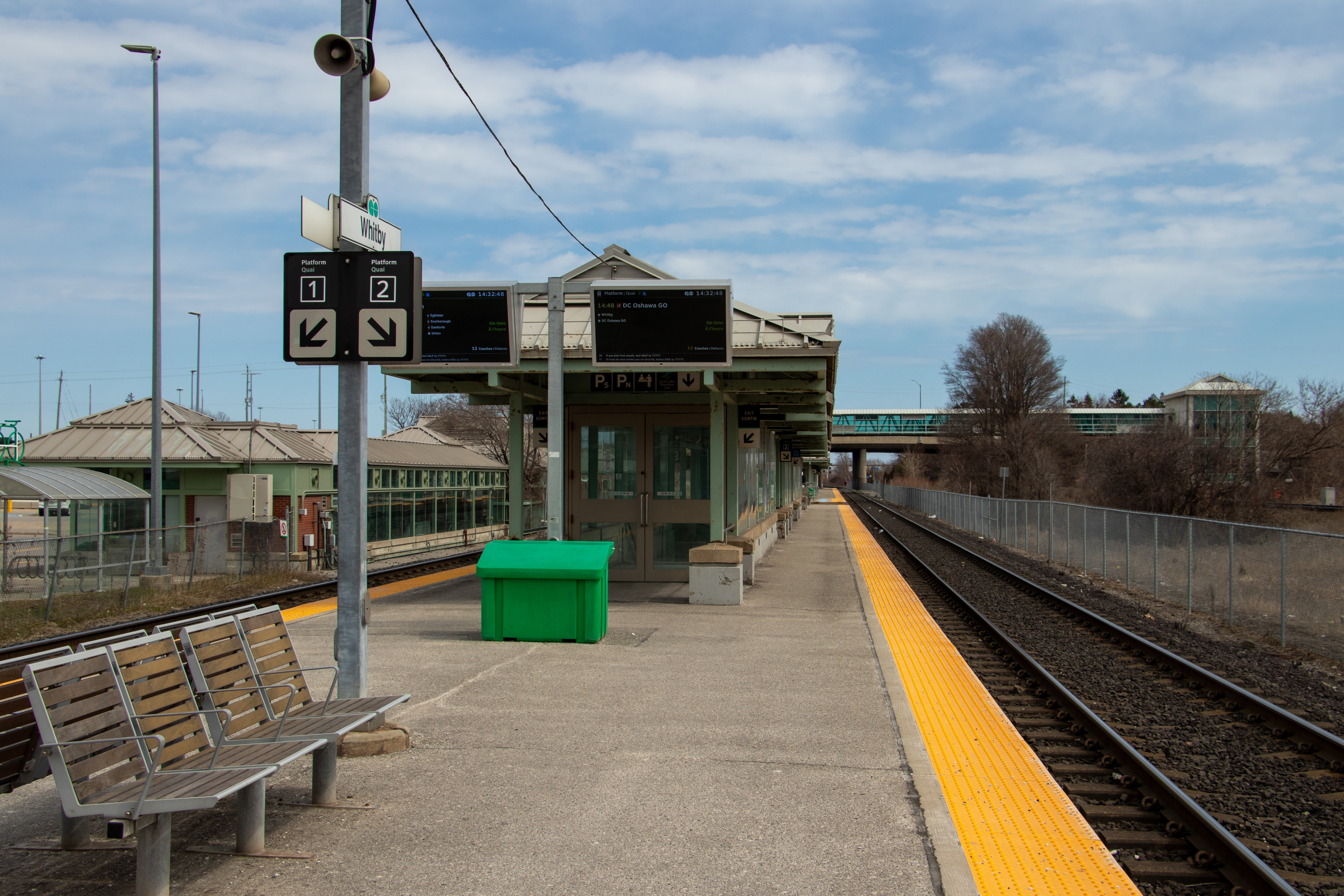
Station platform in 2025

The station is west of Brock Street on the south side of Highway 401. The main station building and bus terminal are on the north side of the railway with the island train platform between the two GO Train tracks connected by tunnels. Facilities inside the station building include the ticket agent, waiting room, and public washroom. The bus loop is north-east of the building, and the passenger pick-up/drop-off area is directly in front.

There are about three thousand parking spaces available, and carpool parking is permitted. The majority of the parking, including a multi-storey parking structure, is on the south side across the CN freight tracks and can be reached by a pedestrian bridge.

== History ==
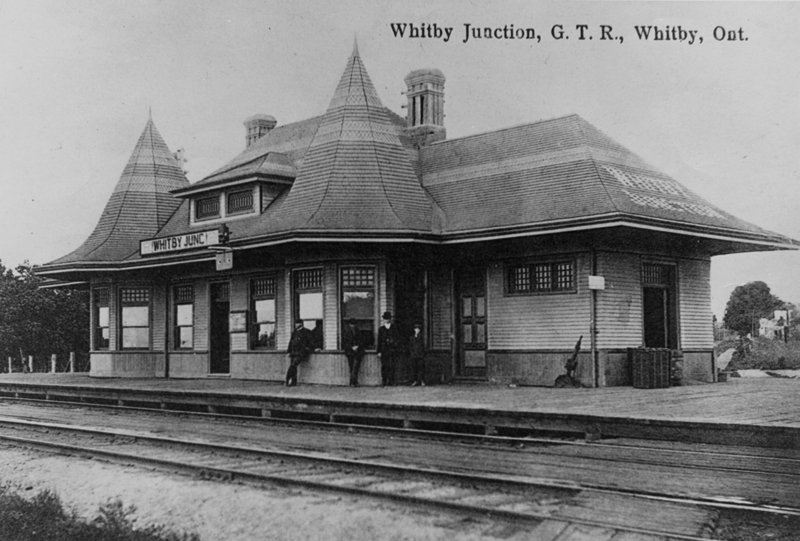
Whitby Junction c.1906

The Whitby Junction Station was built by the Grand Trunk Railway in 1903, at the foot of Byron Street near where the current GO Station is. It closed in 1969, and in 1971 the building was moved; first to the north-east corner of Victoria Street and Henry Street for use as an art gallery, and then in 2005 relocated across the street into Whitby Iroquois Park at the north-west corner of the intersection.

The southerly terminus of the Whitby, Port Perry and Lindsay Railway was at the harbour in Whitby, and that line linked with the Grand Trunk Railway a short distance east of the station.

== Connecting buses ==
=== GO Bus ===
- 90 - Lakeshore East Bus (night-time only)
- 96 - Oshawa/Finch Express Bus

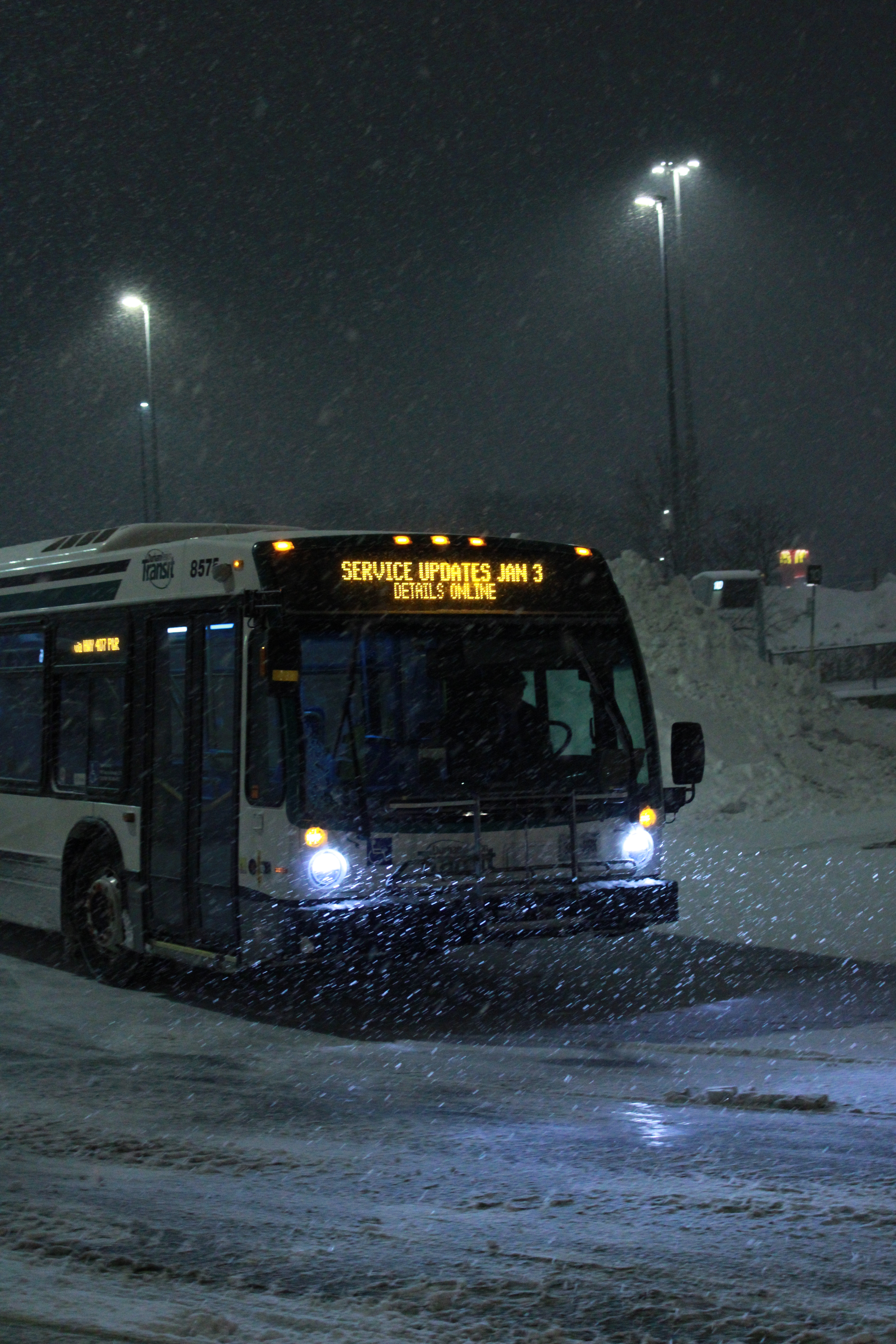
A DRT Public Transit Vehicle at Whitby GO Station

=== Durham Region Transit ===
- 301 to Taunton Road via McQuay Blvd & Country Lane
- 302 to North Campus
- 302B to Anderson Road
- 302C to North Campus via Conlin Road
- 315 to Port Whitby
- 319 to Taunton Road via Garden/Anderson Streets
- 392 to Ontario Shores
- 905A to Windfields Farm
- 905C to Uxbridge via Port Perry
- 917 to Pickering Parkway Terminal (west), Oshawa Centre Terminal (east)

=== Long-distance buses ===
- Megabus: Toronto - Montreal

== See also ==
- Whitby Rail Maintenance Facility, a nearby GO Transit rail facility
