= Ajax-Pickering Transit =

Defunct public transit operator for Ajax and Pickering, Ontario

Ajax Pickering Transit Authority
- Founded: 2001 (merger of Ajax Transit and Pickering Transit)
- Defunct: 2006 (merged into Durham Region Transit)
- Locale: Durham Region, Ontario, Canada
- Service area: Ajax and Pickering, Ontario, Canada
- Service type: Bus service
- Operator: Town of Ajax, City of Pickering (jointly)

The Ajax Pickering Transit Authority (APTA) was a public transit operator in the Town of Ajax, Ontario, Canada, and the City of Pickering. It was merged with the other public transit agencies in Durham Region on January 1, 2006 to form Durham Region Transit.

APTA was jointly owned by Pickering and Ajax and governed by members of the Authority appointed by both municipalities.

== Routes ==
The following routes were operated:

- Industrial
- Liverpool
- Amberlea
- Glendale
- West Shore
- Bay Ridges
- Rosebank
- Rouge Hill Shuttle
- Ajax
- Finch/Highway 2
- Brock Road
- Maple Ridge
- Beach
- Westney
- Shoal Point
- Nottingham
- Harwood
- Duffins
- Elm
- Village
- Puckrin
- Applecroft
- Flag Bus 1,2,3

== History ==
APTA was created on September 4, 2001 from the merger of Pickering Transit and Ajax Transit. It operated until the creation of Durham Region Transit in 2006.

== Fleet ==
The following was APTA's roster at its dissolution on December 31, 2005:

Conventional Bus Fleet List
| Numbers | Qty | Year | Make | Model | Notes |
|---|---|---|---|---|---|
| 2001-2011 | 11 | 1999 | OBI | 06.501 | |
| 2012-2015 | 4 | 1994 | OBI | 05.501 | |
| 2016-2019 | 4 | 1992 | OBI | 05.501 | |
| 2020 | 1 | 1991 | OBI | 05.501 | |
| 2022-2023 | 2 | 1989 | OBI | 05.501 | |
| 2024-2025 | 2 | 1989 | OBI | 01.507 | |
| 2026-2029 | 4 | 1988 | NFI | D40 | |
| 2030-2031 | 2 | 1988 | OBI | 01.508 | |
| 2033 | 1 | 1988 | OBI | 01.507 | |
| 2034-2035 | 2 | 1987 | OBI | 01.508 | |
| 2036 | 1 | 1987 | OBI | 01.507 | |
| 2037-2038 | 2 | 1997 | MTB | glider | |
| 2039 | 1 | 1986 | OBI | 01.508 | |
| 2040 | 1 | 1984 | OBI | 01.507 | |
| 2042-2043 | 2 | 1984 | OBI | 01.502 | |
| 2044 | 1 | 1982 | OBI | 01.504 | ex-Timmins Transit |
| 2050-2055 | 6 | 2003 | OBI | 05.501 | |
| 2060-2061 | 2 | 1990 | OBI | 05.501 | ex-RGRTA |
| 2062-2065 | 4 | 1992 | OBI | 05.501 | ex-PaT |

Abbreviations
| MTB | Mississauga Truck and Bus |
| NFI | New Flyer Industries |
| OBI | Orion Bus Industries |
