= Durham Region Transit =

Regional public transportation agency in Durham Region, Ontario, Canada

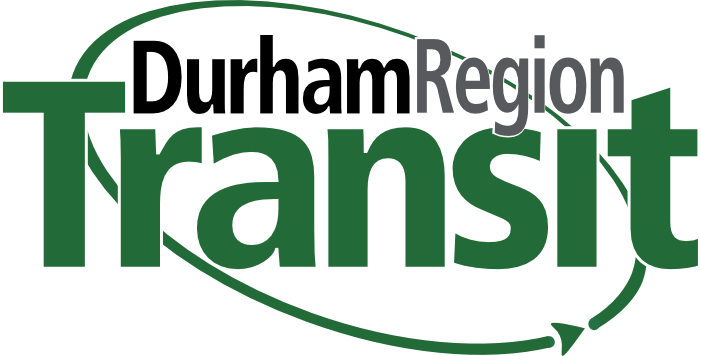

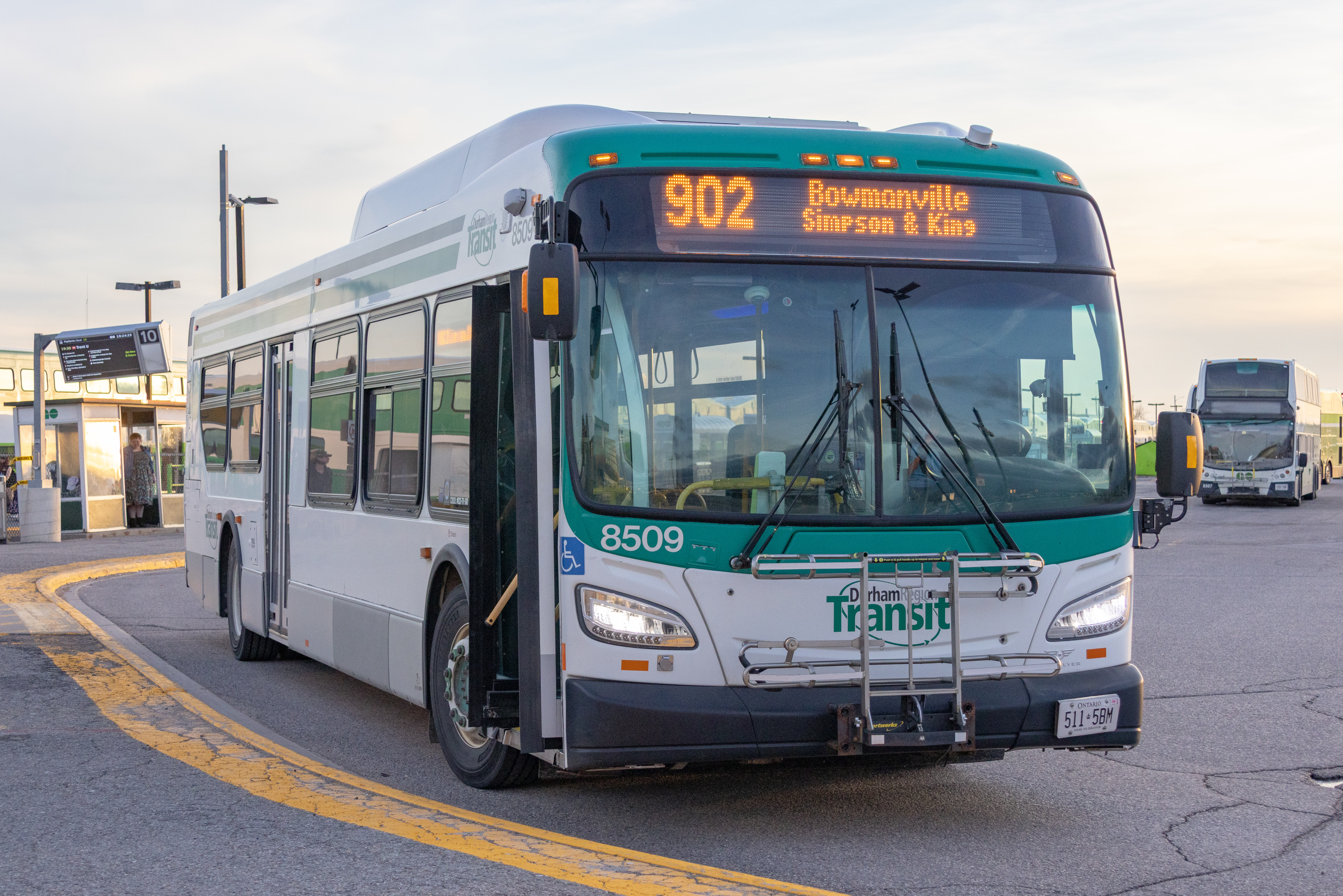
- Bus 8509 at Oshawa GO Station
- Founded: January 1, 2006; 20 years ago
- Headquarters: 110 Westney Road South; Ajax, Ontario; L1S 2C8
- Locale: Durham Region
- Service area: Greater Toronto Area
- Service type: Public transit
- Routes: 33
- Stops: 1500+
- Fleet: 121 (Conventional); 57 (BRT)
- Daily ridership: 67,000 (weekdays, Q4 2023)
- Annual ridership: 10,589,799 (2023)
- Fuel type: Diesel, Hybrid, Electric
- Operator: Durham Region
- Website: www.durhamregiontransit.com

Durham Region Transit (DRT) is the regional public transit operator in Durham Region, Ontario, Canada, east of Toronto. Its headquarters are at 110 Westney Road South in Ajax, Ontario, and there are regional centres in Ajax, Whitby, and Oshawa. DRT was formed by the merger of Ajax/Pickering Transit, Whitby Transit, Oshawa Transit, and Clarington Transit on January 1, 2006.

== Overview ==
DRT's operation is overseen by the Durham Region Transit Commission, consisting of the members of Durham Region Council. In April 2007, the Durham Region Transit Executive Committee was created to take over day-to-day oversight responsibilities, with the full Commission meeting on a limited basis as needed. The executive committee consists of the Regional Chair and one councillor or mayor from each of the eight Durham Region municipalities as appointed by each municipality.

DRT is organized into three operating divisions:

- Raleigh serving the City of Oshawa, Municipality of Clarington, and the Town of Whitby
- Westney serving the Town of Ajax, City of Pickering and the Town of Whitby
- DRT On-Demand & Specialized Services provide service to rural and urban areas without bus service as well as for the disabled

Most of DRT's operational and maintenance services are provided by regional staff who are members of Unifor Local 222.

DRT service in the Town of Whitby was initially operated under the terms of an existing Whitby Transit contract with Trentway-Wagar. A new contract that combined Brock, Scugog & Uxbridge operations with Whitby operations was awarded to Trentway-Wagar in 2011. The drivers and maintenance staff were therefore employees of Trentway-Wagar. This contract ended on June 30, 2016. A new contract with Pacific Western Transit (PWT) was signed in 2017. As of December 31, 2023, this contract has ended and all transit service in Whitby has been transitioned to Durham Region Transit operators and staff.

== Service changes ==
In its first year of operation in 2006, DRT implemented a number of service changes:

- A common fare across Durham Region including transfer privileges
- Access to GO Transit bus services operating within Durham Region for a standard DRT fare or transfer
- Service for the northern communities of Port Perry, Brock, and Uxbridge in the form of community buses operating on specific days of the week
- Implementation of Fixed-route evening/Sunday service in Ajax and Pickering replacing the former "dial-a-bus" service.
- Service level improvements on several routes
- The introduction of several new or extended routes, including:
  - Rush-hour Service along Brock Street/Baldwin Street (Highway 12) to Brooklin
  - Rush-hour Service along Bloor Street and Victoria Street (Durham Regional Road 22) from Durham College Oshawa GO to Whitby GO Train Stations
  - Service on Audley Road in Ajax, both south of Bayly Street and north of Kingston Road
  - Service along Townline Road in eastern Oshawa and Courtice
  - Weekend service to Whitby and Durham College Oshawa GO Transit stations

In 2007, the following new services were introduced:

- 915 Taunton: grid service from Pickering GO Station via Bayly, Westney, Taunton and Simcoe to Durham College/Ontario Tech University
- 916 Rossland : grid service from Ajax GO Station via Westney, Bayly, Harwood, Rossland, Grandview, Taunton, Ritson, Conlin and Simcoe
- 302 Brock/Brooklin: increased service to Brooklin
- 20 Westney and 40 Applecroft, and elimination of 23 Nottingham as a separate route
- 504 Orono/Newcastle: revised to include Newcastle
- 950 Uxbridge/Port Perry/Ontario Tech University: a grid weekday route from Uxbridge and Port Perry to Durham College/Ontario Tech University
- replacement of Whitby dial a ride and shuttle bus service from the GO station with fixed routes

As a consequence of an operational budget shortfall, DRT implemented service cutbacks in December 2007 and March 2008, including cancellation of midday services, reduction in service hours and frequencies, and elimination of its 10 Ajax route.

=== Whitby Autonomous Vehicle Electric shuttle ===
The Whitby Autonomous Vehicle Electric (WAVE) shuttle was an experimental bus service using autonomous vehicles; as of January 2022, WAVE is no longer in operation. WAVE began service on November 8, 2021, using small, automated, driverless, electric vehicles. WAVE operated over a 6 km (3.7 mi) circuit beginning and ending at Whitby GO Station and travelling through the Port Whitby neighbourhood in south Whitby. For safety reasons, an attendant was on board the vehicle during the pilot phase of the project. The vehicle had a maximum speed of 20 km/h (12 mph). The service operated as Durham Region Transit route 300 between 8:30 am and 3:30 pm on weekdays and between 7 am and 7 pm on weekends. The project partners included Metrolinx, Durham Region Transit and the Town of Whitby.

The service was suspended after an accident on December 16, 2021, that injured the attendant riding on the autonomous vehicle. At the time of the accident, the attendant was operating the vehicle in manual mode which suppressed the safety features of autonomous mode. The Ontario Ministry of Transport suspended the operating licence for the service after the accident. The service was cancelled after Local Motors, the vehicle supplier, went out of business on January 14, 2022.

== DRT Pulse and Rapid Transit ==
DRT Pulse

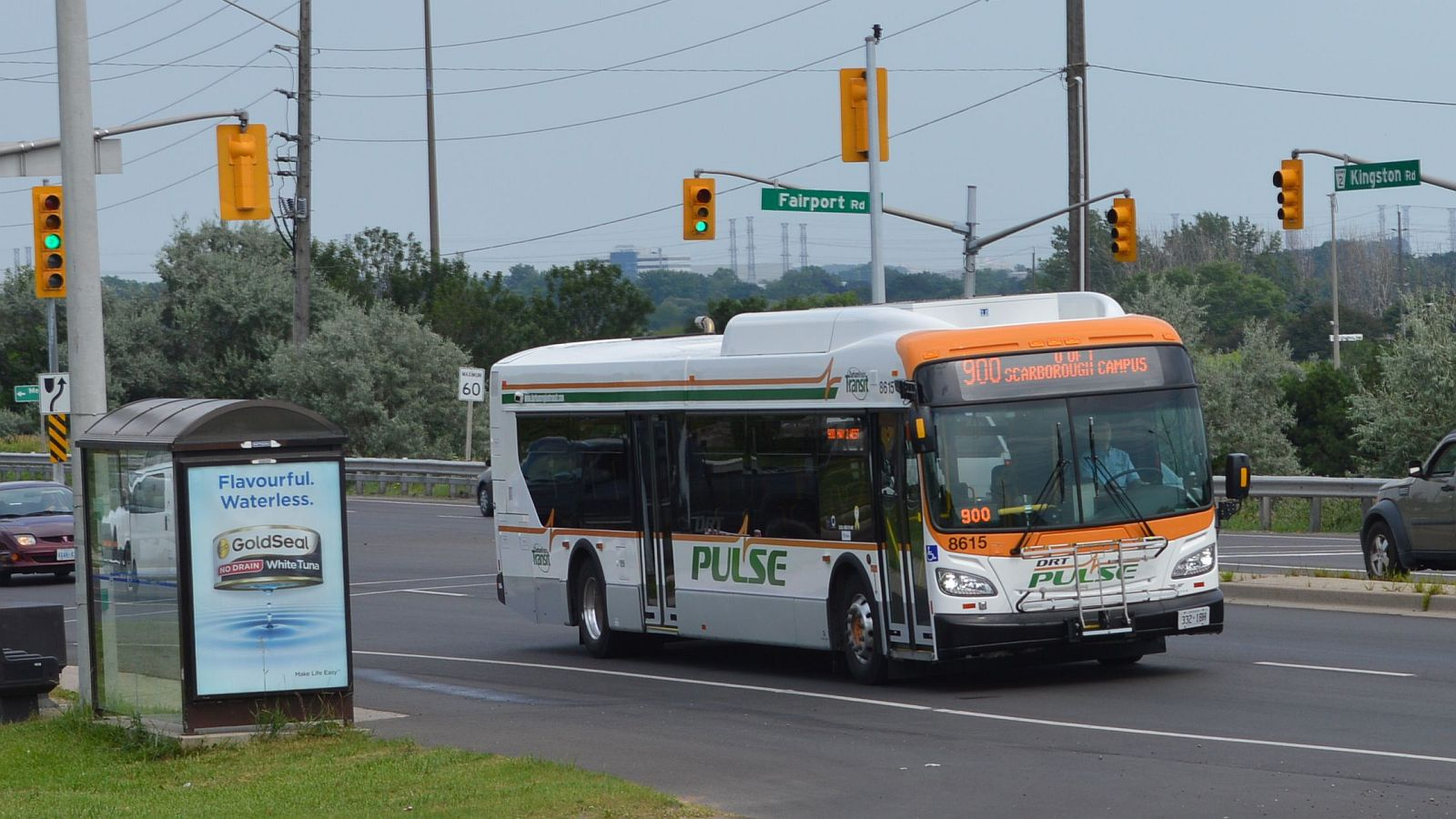
- Parent: Durham Region Transit
- Founded: June 29, 2013
- Locale: Durham Region
- Service area: Greater Toronto
- Service type: Bus rapid transit
- Routes: 4 (900, 901, 915, 916)
- Destinations: Downtown Oshawa; University of Toronto Scarborough; Ontario Tech University
- Fleet: 57 (New Flyer Xcelsior, Nova Bus LFS)
- Fuel type: Diesel

DRT Pulse is DRT's branded bus service, and precursor to bus rapid transit. Originally launched as a route along Ontario Highway 2, there are now three other routes using the pulse brand. Pulse branded routes include 900, 901, 915, and 916. DRT Pulse isn't an express service, it only guarantees better frequencies than regular local routes.

- 900 runs east–west along Highway 2 in Durham Region and along Ellesmere Road in Scarborough between Downtown Oshawa and Centennial Circle on the University of Toronto Scarborough campus. Connections to Toronto Transit Commission services are available at U of T Scarborough and connections to GO Transit are available at various points along the line. The route partially operates in dedicated bus lanes. Operates express service between Centennial College and Pickering.
- 901 runs north–south along Simcoe Street between Lakeview Park to Windfield Farms via the OTU/Durham College North Campus. The route operates in mixed traffic.
- 915 runs east–west along Taunton Road & Westney Road between Ajax GO Station and Harmony Road/Conlin Road. The route operates in mixed traffic. Connections to GO Transit are available at Ajax GO.
- 916 runs east–west along Rossland Road & Harmony Road between Pickering Parkway Terminal and Harmony Road/Conlin Road. Connections to GO Transit are available at Pickering Parkway.

Route 900, the first phase of DRT Pulse, began service June 29, 2013, operating along the Highway 2 corridor between Downtown Oshawa and Centennial College. The new service used 26 Xcelsior buses built by New Flyer Industries; the buses were painted in the orange and green DRT Pulse colours. Operating seven days per week, route 900 partly replaced GO Transit buses in the area. The buses made limited stops, but initially operated entirely in mixed traffic. DRT Pulse was complemented by improved DRT and GO Transit service along Taunton Road, Rossland Road, and Bayly/Bloor/Victoria Streets.

By 2015, Durham Region had installed reserved lanes on Kingston Road (Highway 2) in Ajax for DRT Pulse and GO Transit buses. These cube-side lanes were delimited by painted markings on the road surface and diamond signs over the lanes.

In September 2020, articulated buses, branded for DRT Pulse, were introduced on route 900. On September 28, 2020, DRT Pulse service started along Simcoe Street as route 901. In January 2022, DRT Pulse service started along Taunton and Rossland Roads using DRT Pulse-branded vehicles.

Metrolinx plans to build the Durham–Scarborough BRT that would place most of route 900 in dedicated lanes, with the majority of the route being in the centre median strip of the roadway. Additional lanes will be added in certain sections to accommodate traffic levels, while some areas will see reduced traffic lanes or a complete closure to traffic.

Route 921 is the only route that offers real express service with limited express-designated stops inside Durham Region between Kingston Road at Brock Road and Colin Road at Garrard Road. Both routes 920 and 921 offer express service within Toronto between Scarborough Town Centre and Pickering.

== Fares ==
DRT fares can be paid by cash, contactless payment (credit/debit), PRESTO card or PRESTO E-Tickets. For customers paying a single ride fare using cash or PRESTO, the transfer is valid for unlimited travel on any DRT bus route in any direction for 2 hours from the time of issue. A monthly DRT bus pass provides unlimited travel across the entire DRT bus network for the entire month selected. Children aged 12 and under can travel fare free on DRT (similar to the program in place on neighboring GO Transit and Toronto Transit Commission (TTC) services).

DRT provides two pass systems, both only available with the use of a PRESTO card. The Y-10 Youth Monthly Pass is available for monthly purchase for youth customers (13–19). It must be purchased every month during the school year (September–June) to receive the $18.10 discount. Otherwise, the Y-10 Pass costs $96.50 for one month.

DRT also has a Universal Transit Pass (U-Pass) which provides full-time post-secondary students at participating colleges and universities unlimited travel on the DRT network.

The following institutions participate in DRT's U-Pass program:

- Durham College
- Trent University - Durham GTA
- Ontario Tech University

As of July 1, 2026, the standard DRT fare structure is as follows:

Fare type	Adult	Youth (13–19)	Senior (65+)	Child (12 and under)
Cash/Debit/Credit	$4.85	$4.85	$3.55 (cash), $4.85 (debit/credit)	Free
PRESTO	$3.84	$3.46	$2.53	Free
GO Transit Co-Fare (transferring to and from DRT & GO)	Free	Free	Free	Free
One Fare Program (transferring to and from DRT & TTC)	Free using PRESTO	Free using PRESTO	Free using PRESTO	Free
Monthly Pass	$138.24	$110.59	$55.30	—N/a
Y10 Monthly Pass	—N/a	$87.28	—N/a	—N/a
DRT U-Pass	$160.34/semester, covered in tuition fees for students at participating post-secondary institutions			

== Facilities ==
DRT uses the following maintenance and operational facilities:

Raleigh Division:

Address: 710 Raleigh Avenue, Oshawa
Coordinates: 43°52′57″N 78°49′43″W
Opened: 1965 (original) 1980 (GO Transit expansion)
Facilities: bus storage, maintenance and servicing for DRT (GO Transit no longer operates out of this location as of 2012-13)

Westney Division:

Address: 110 Westney Road South, Ajax
Coordinates: 43°50′43″N 79°02′28″W
Opened: 1988
Facilities: bus storage, maintenance and repairs

Thornton Division:

Address: 2400 Thornton Road North, Oshawa
Coordinates: 43°57′13″N 78°55′24″W
Opened: Scheduled for 2026
Facilities: bus storage, maintenance and repairs

== History ==
DRT was formed in January 2006 through an amalgamation of existing municipal transit systems in Pickering, Ajax, Whitby, Oshawa, and Clarington (Bowmanville). The systems were transferred to the regional government along with the legal authority to operate public transit in the local municipalities. This required approval by both Durham Region Council as well as four out of eight local municipal councils consisting of at least 50% of the population of the Region. The approval process took several years, with final approval for the amalgamation given by Durham Region Council on February 9, 2005. The remainder of 2005 was spent preparing for the merger. DRT assumed its responsibilities and inherited the equipment and facilities of its predecessor systems effective January 1, 2006.

On October 5, 2006, members of Local 222 began a legal strike action against DRT. All services were suspended other than those operated by Trentway-Wagar in Whitby. Limited specialized service continued via the use of contracted taxis. On October 29, a tentative settlement was announced, and full service resumed on November 3.

=== Previous systems ===
Public transit service in Durham Region has a long history prior to the creation of DRT, dating back to the 19th century. The list below shows predecessor transit systems in each municipality:

Pickering

- Pickering Transit (1970s-2001)
- Ajax Pickering Transit Authority (2001–2005)

Ajax

- Charterways Transportation Limited (1969–1973)
- Ajax Transit (1973–2001)
- Ajax Pickering Transit Authority (2001–2005)

Whitby

- Burley Bus Lines (1960–1970)
- Charterways Transportation Limited - 8 week trial in 1976
- Whitby Transit (1980–2005)
- Specialized Service provided by Handi-Transit from 1974 to 2005

Oshawa

- Oshawa Railway Company (operated by Canadian National Railway - 1895–1959)
- Queen Bus Lines (operated Toronto-Oshawa interurban bus in the 1920s) and acquired by Gray Coach 1929
- Oshawa Transit (1960–2005)
- Specialized Service provided by Handi-Transit from 1974 to 2005

Clarington

- Clarington Transit (2002–2005)
- Specialized Service provided by Handi-Transit from 1974 to 2005

== See also ==
- Toronto Transit Commission
- GO Transit
