= Scarborough, Ontario =

Former city in Ontario, Canada

Scarborough
- Dissolved city (lower-tier)
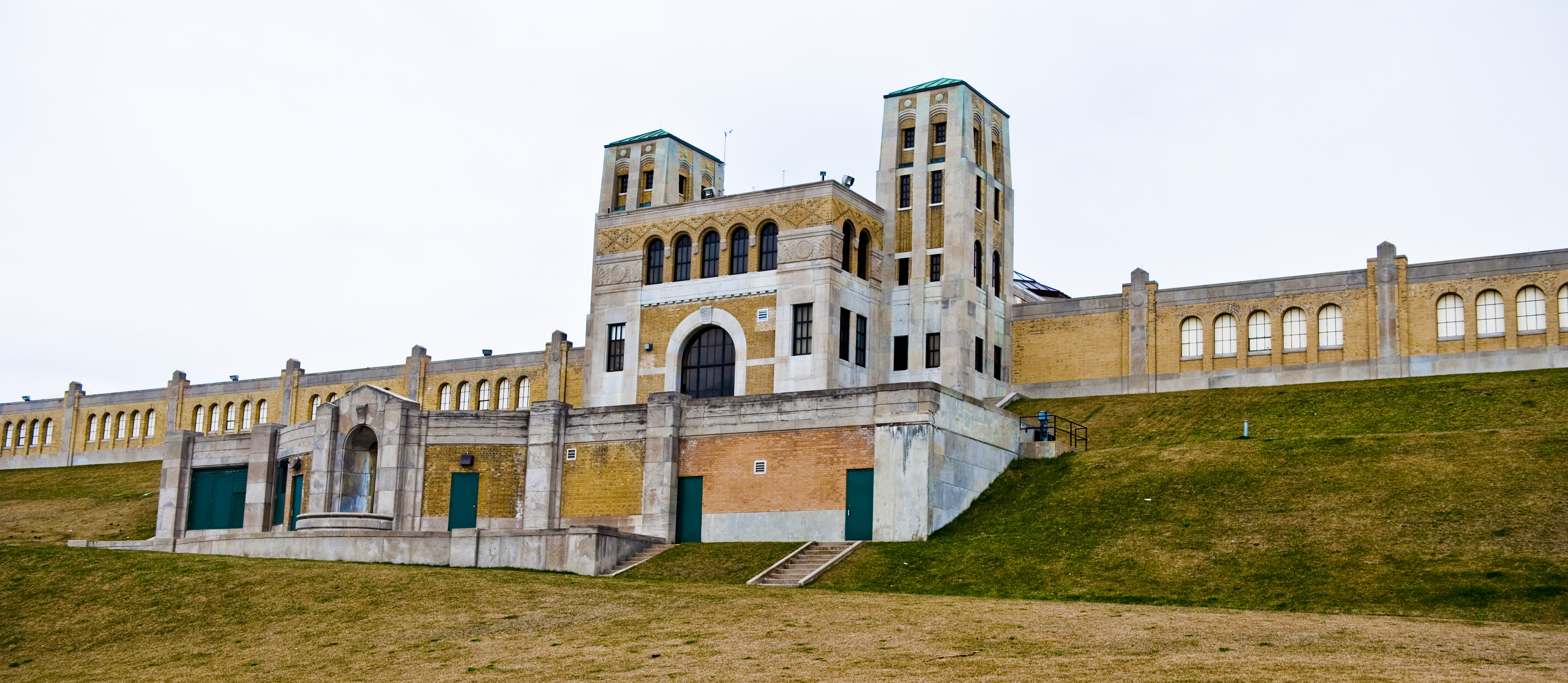
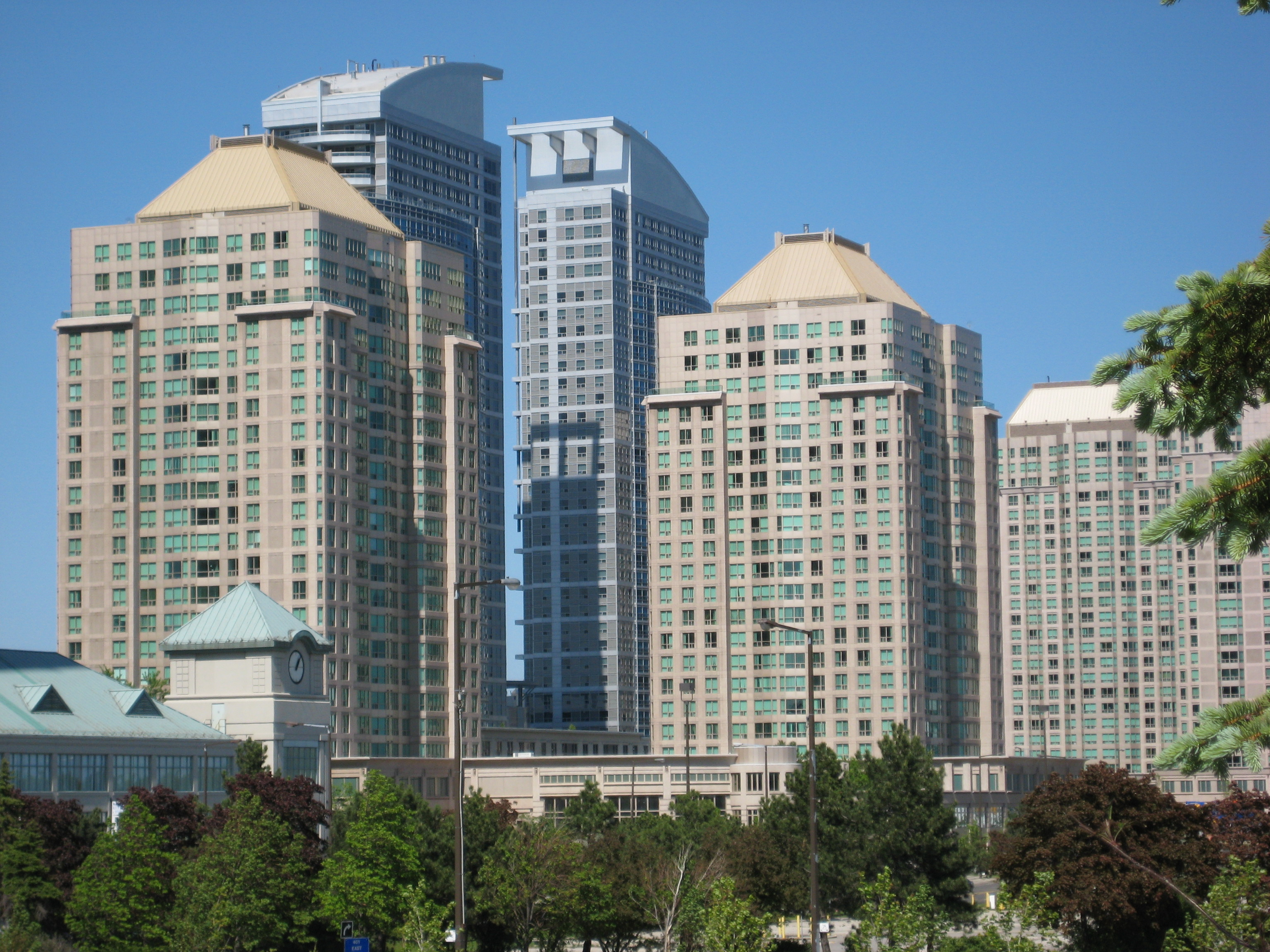
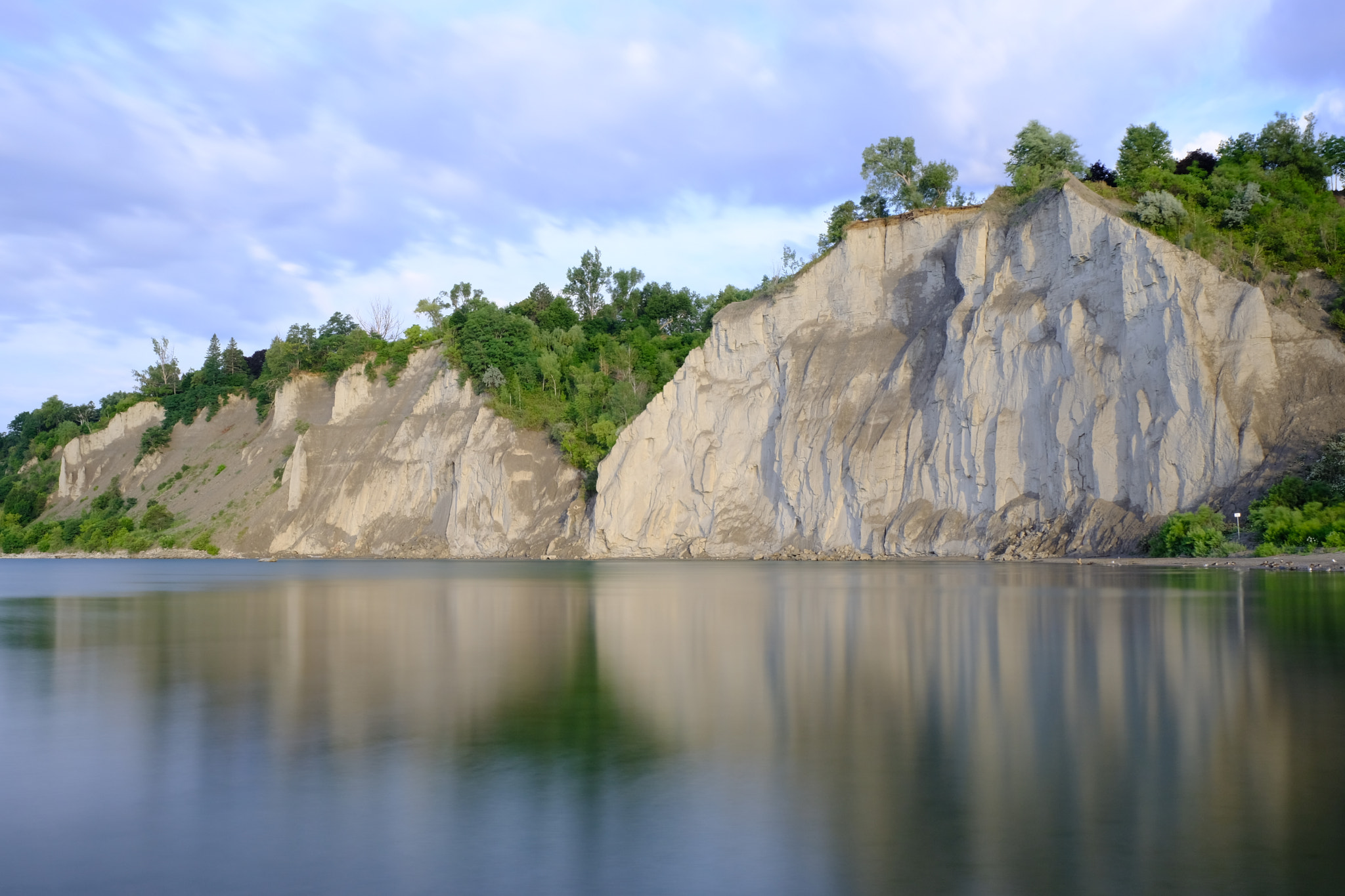
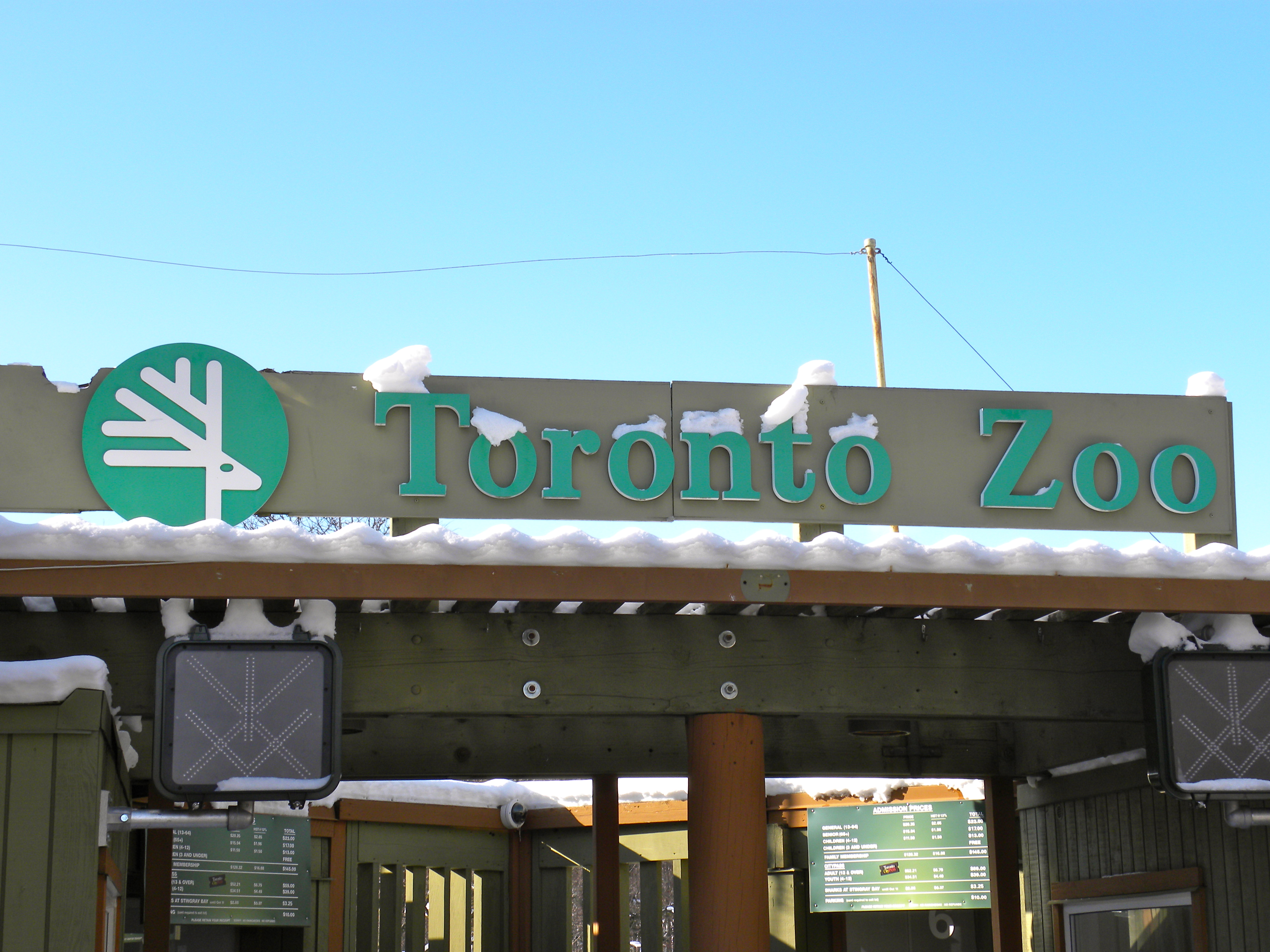
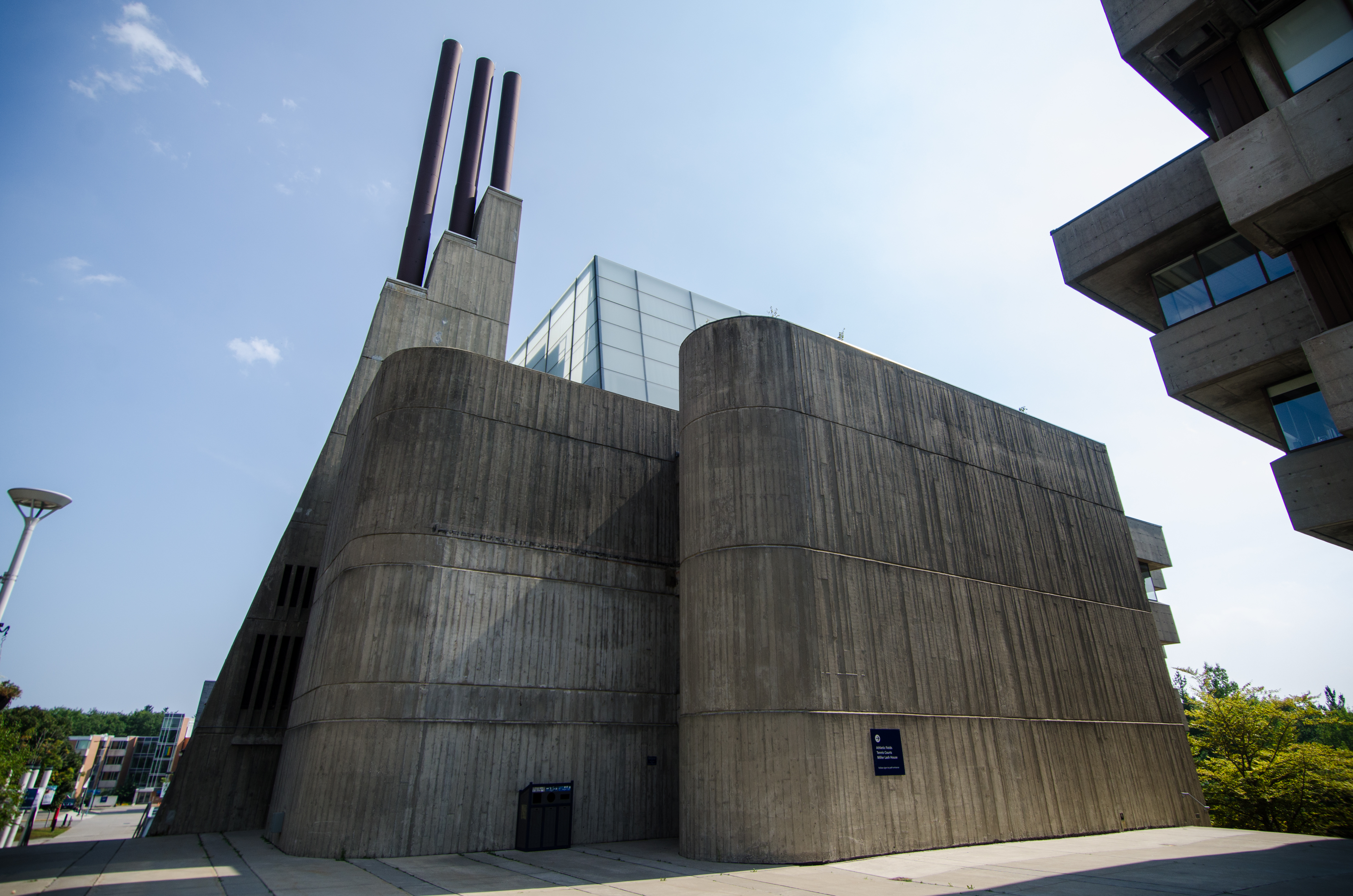
- R. C. Harris Water Treatment Plant Scarborough City Centre Scarborough Bluffs Toronto Zoo University of Toronto Scarborough

- Flag Coat of arms
- Motto: Home Above the Bluffs
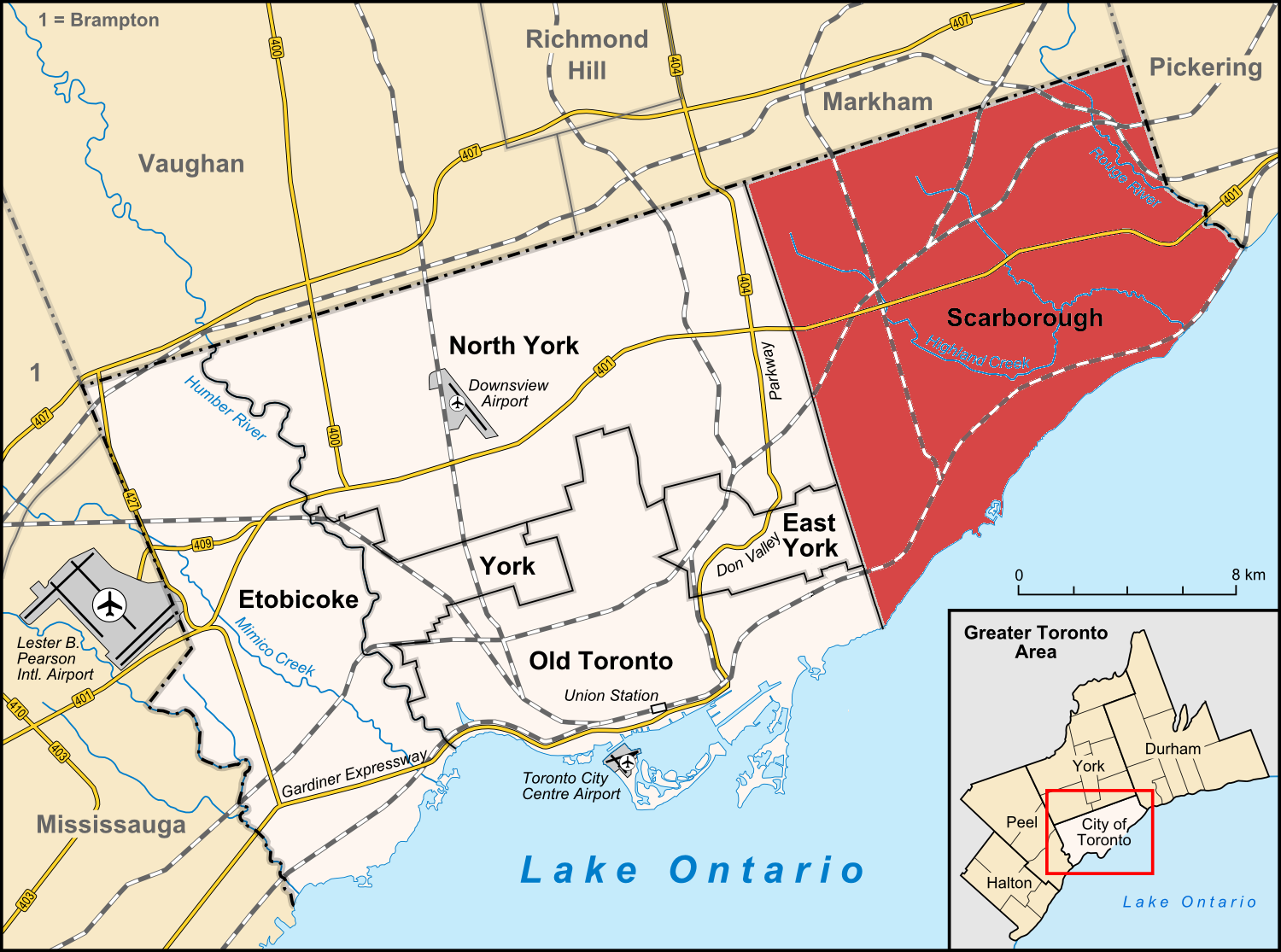
- Location of Scarborough (red) within the rest of Toronto
- Interactive map of Scarborough
- Coordinates: 43°45′21″N 79°13′51″W
- Country: Canada
- Province: Ontario
- Municipality: Toronto
- Incorporated: January 1, 1850 (township); January 1, 1967 (borough); June 1983 (city)
- Changed region: 1954 (Metropolitan Toronto from York County)
- Amalgamated into Toronto: January 1, 1998

Government
  - Councillors: Parthi Kandavel; Neethan Shanmugarajah; Jamaal Myers; Michael Thompson; Nick Mantas; Paul Ainslie
  - MPs: Shaun Chen (L); Michael Coteau (L); Sathiyasangaree Anadasangaree (L); Jean Yip (L); Salma Zahid (L); Doly Begum (L)
  - MPPs: Raymond Cho (PC); Vijay Thanigasalam (PC); Aris Babikian (PC); David Smith (PC); Andrea Hazell (OLP)

Area
  - Total: 187.70 km^{2} (72.47 sq mi)

Population (2021)
  - Total: 629,941
  - Density: 3,356.1/km^{2} (8,692/sq mi)
- Time zone: UTC–5 (EST)
  - Summer (DST): UTC–4 (EDT)
- Postal code span: M1(B-X)
- Area codes: 416, 647, and 437

Scarborough (/ˈskɑːrbʌroʊ/; 2021 census 623,610) is a former city that is now part of Toronto, Ontario, Canada, situated in the eastern part of Toronto. Its borders are Victoria Park Avenue to the west, Steeles Avenue and the city of Markham to the north, Rouge River and the city of Pickering to the east, and Lake Ontario to the south. Scarborough was named after the English town of Scarborough, North Yorkshire, inspired by its cliffs.

Scarborough is the site of several former Indigenous settlements dating back many centuries. It was settled by Europeans in the 1790s and has grown from a collection of small rural villages and farms to become a fully urbanized and diverse cultural community. Incorporated in 1850 as a township, the district became part of Metropolitan Toronto in 1953 and was reconstituted as a borough in 1967. The borough rapidly developed as a suburb of Toronto over the next decade and became a city in 1983. In 1998, the city and the rest of Metropolitan Toronto were amalgamated into the present city of Toronto. The Scarborough Civic Centre – the former city's last seat of government – now houses offices of the municipal government of Toronto.

Since the end of the Second World War, the district has been a popular destination for new immigrants in Canada. As a result, it is one of the most diverse and multicultural areas in the Greater Toronto Area, being home to various religious groups and places of worship. It includes a number of natural landmarks, including the Toronto Zoo, Rouge Park, and the Scarborough Bluffs. The northeast corner of the district is largely rural with some of Toronto's last remaining farms, earning Scarborough its reputation of being greener than any other part of Toronto.

== Etymology ==
The area is named after the English town of Scarborough, inspired by Elizabeth Simcoe, the wife of John Graves Simcoe, the first lieutenant governor of Upper Canada. The bluffs along the Lake Ontario shores reminded her of the limestone cliffs in Scarborough, England. On August 4, 1793, she wrote in her diary, "The shore is extremely bold, and has the appearance of chalk cliffs, but I believe they are only white sand. They appeared so well that we talked of building a summer residence there and calling it Scarborough." Before that, the area was named Glasgow, after the Scottish city.

The district acquired several nicknames due to its location and population. Following the creation of the Metropolitan Toronto, Scarberia, a portmanteau of Scarborough and Siberia, refers to Scarborough's further distance from Downtown Toronto and lower population density, in comparison to Etobicoke and North York. Until the extension of the Bloor-Danforth subway line into Scarborough, public transit connection between Scarborough and the rest of Toronto was limited and infrastructure investment from the municipal government and province of Ontario was low. In May 1988, Joyce Trimmer, who was campaigning to be mayor of the city of Scarborough, said, "The city of Scarborough needs strong leadership if it is to shed its 'Scarberia' image". Throughout the late 1990s, "Scarlem", a portmanteau of Scarborough and Harlem, became popular after an increase in gang violence in the area.

== History ==
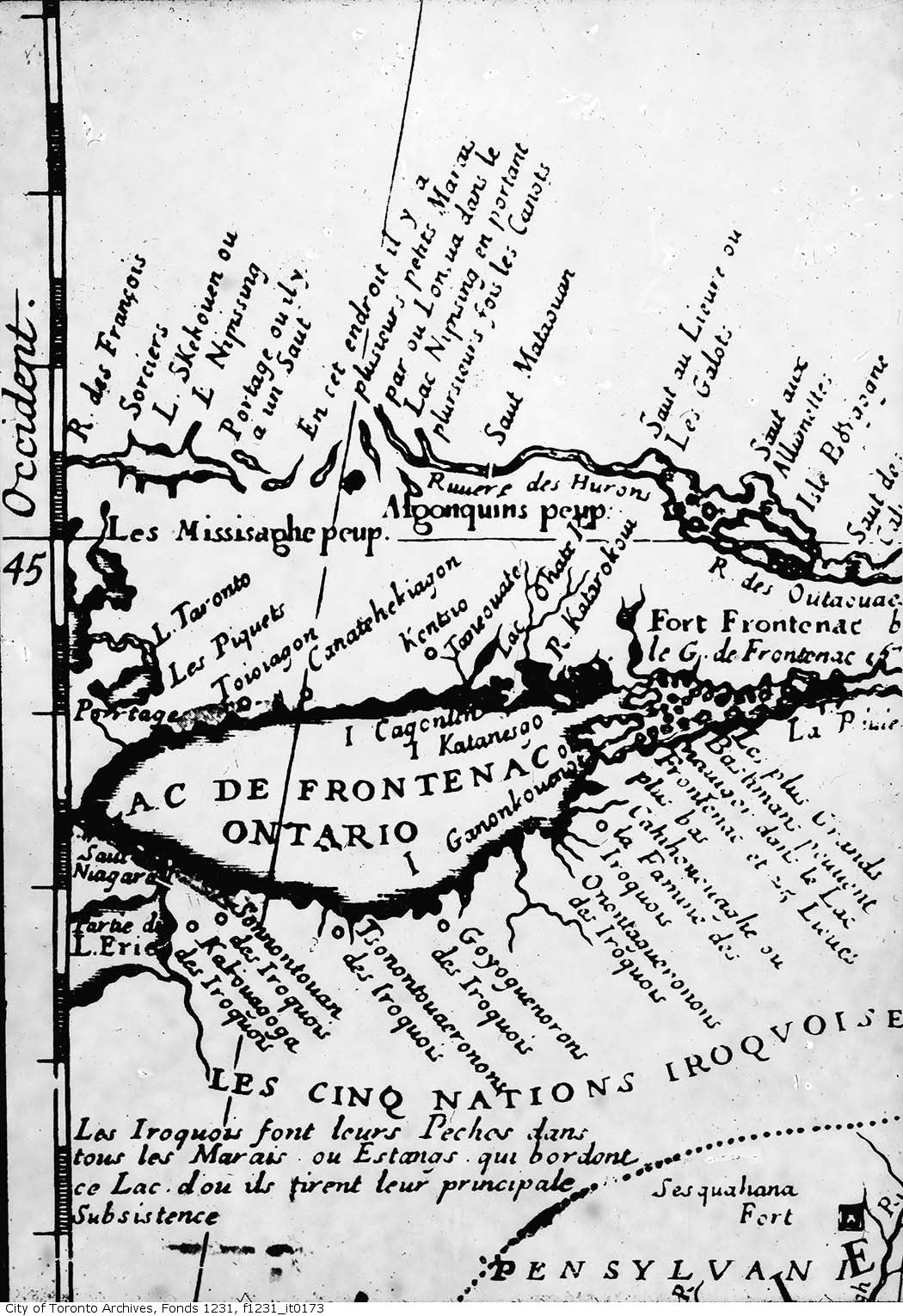
Late-1600s map that shows the Seneca settlement of Ganatsekwyagon, in present-day Scarborough

The first known evidence of people in the district comes from an archaeological site in Fenwood Heights, which has been dated to 8000 BCE. The site contains the remains of a camp of nomadic hunters and foragers, and there is no evidence of permanent settlers.

In the 17th century, the area was inhabited by the Seneca at the village of Ganatsekwyagon. They were later displaced by the Mississaugas, who were themselves displaced by the European settlers who began to arrive in the late 18th century. After the land was surveyed in 1793, it was opened to settlement by British subjects with the first issue of land patents in 1796, although squatters had already been present for a few years. The first settlers were David and Andrew Thomson. They were stonemasons who worked on the first parliament buildings for York. They each built mills. This activity led to the creation of a small village known as the Thomson Settlement. The first post office opened in 1832, in Scarborough Village.

During the early part of life in Upper Canada, local administration and justice was administered by the colonial government. From 1792 to 1841, magistrates were appointed by District Councils. There were four districts in the colony of which Scarborough was part of the Home District. Partly due to a political reorganization that was a result of the Durham Report, Scarborough gained elected representation on the Home District Council. Scarborough elected two councillors.

In 1850, the district was incorporated as a township. After incorporation, Scarborough government was led by a reeve, a deputy-reeve and three councillors, each elected annually. Initially the council met in the village of Woburn but it was relocated to Birch Cliff in 1920, where most of the population was then located. During the Great Depression, the local government was on the verge of bankruptcy. The Ontario Municipal Board stepped in and appointed an oversight committee which prevented the collapse of local government.

On April 15, 1953, the township was included within Metropolitan Toronto, a new upper level of municipal government with jurisdiction over regional services such as arterial roads and transit, police, and ambulance services. (Fire fighting services remained separate.) Scarborough retained its local council but gained representation on a new Metro Council. The new council had 24 members, 12 from the old city of Toronto and 12 from the suburban municipalities. The council was not directly elected but was made up of members of each of the local councils. Scarborough's contribution was its reeve who at the time was Oliver E. Crockford.

In 1967, the district was incorporated as a borough. The reeve was replaced with a mayor. Albert Campbell, who had been reeve since 1957, became Scarborough's first mayor. The new borough's council consisted of the mayor and four members of the board of control (which functioned as an executive committee). There were also ten aldermen. The mayor and the controllers also sat on Metro Council. In 1973, the borough increased in size when the West Rouge area, formerly within the Township of Pickering, was transferred to it with the creation of the Regional Municipality of Durham. The borough's status was changed to city in 1983. The number of aldermen was increased to 14 and the term of office extended to three years from two.

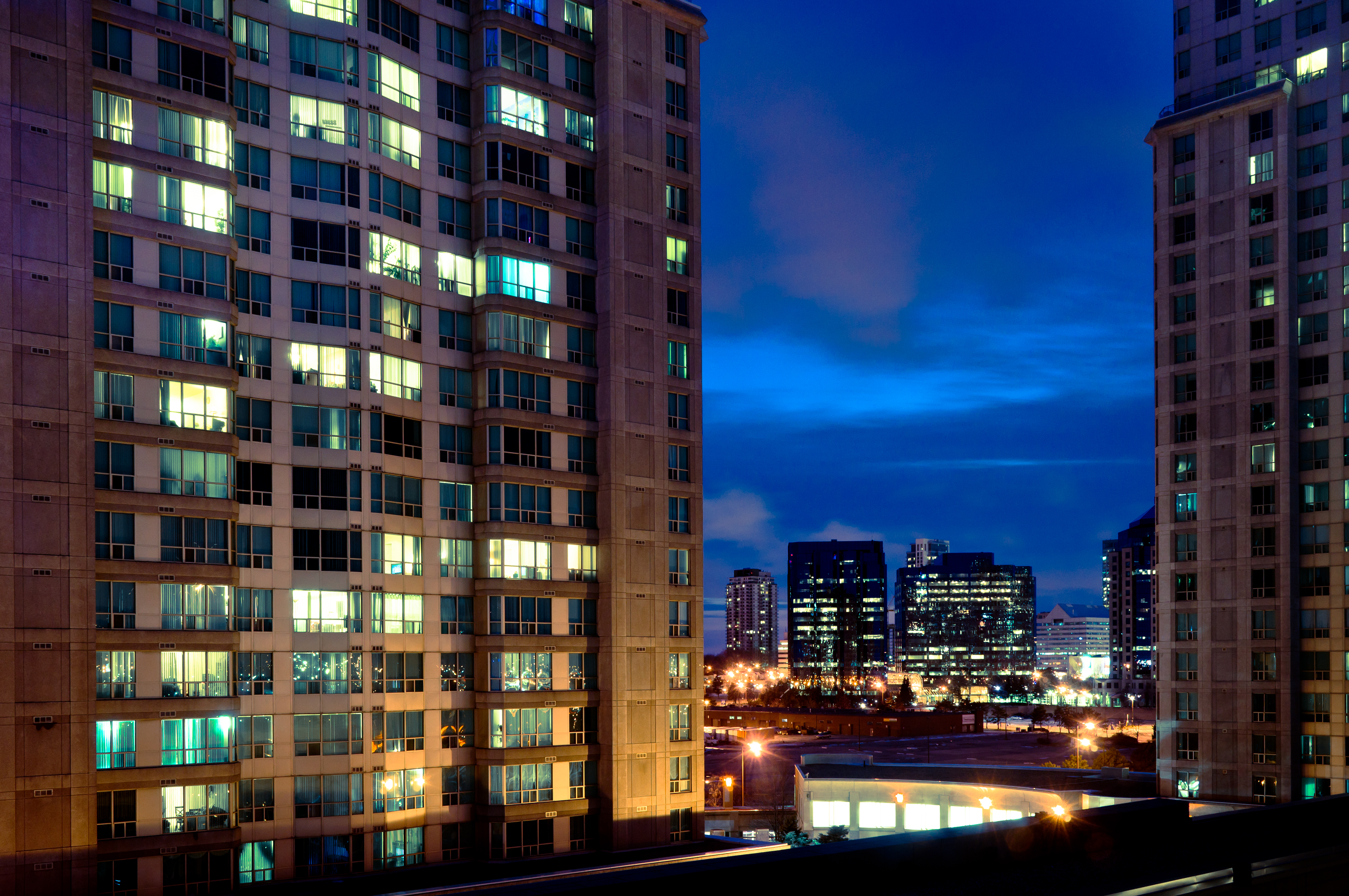
A number of high-rises and condominiums were built around Scarborough City Centre in the late-20th to early-21st century.

As the urban area continued to expand, much of rural Scarborough was converted to suburban housing developments in the last third of the 20th century. At the start of the 21st century, growth occurred along the Highway 401 corridor at the northern end of the Scarborough RT; highrise condominium projects have increased the residential density around Scarborough City Centre.

In 1988, there was a reorganization. The board of control was abolished. Alderman was changed to councillor. Six additional metro council positions were created and these were elected separately for the first time. Scarborough's council consisted of a mayor, 14 local councillors and six Metro councillors.

In 1998, the municipality of Scarborough was dissolved and the district amalgamated with East York, Etobicoke, North York, York, and the old city of Toronto into the current city of Toronto.

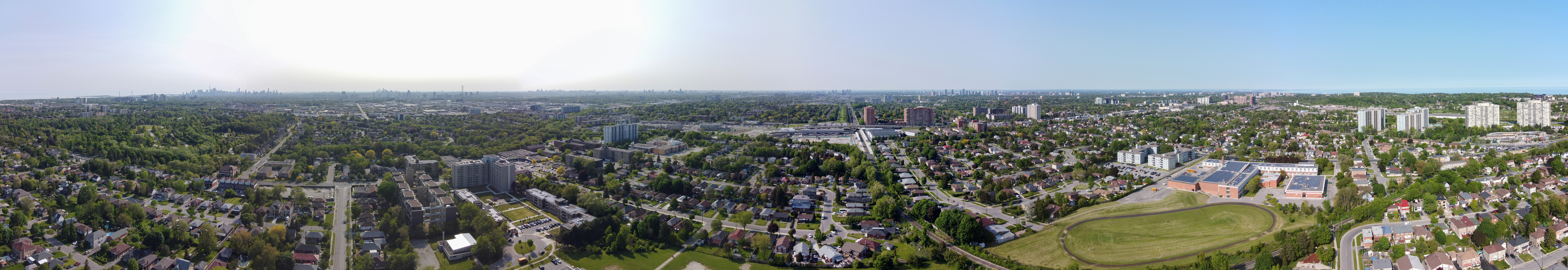
Panoramic view of Scarborough.

== Geography ==
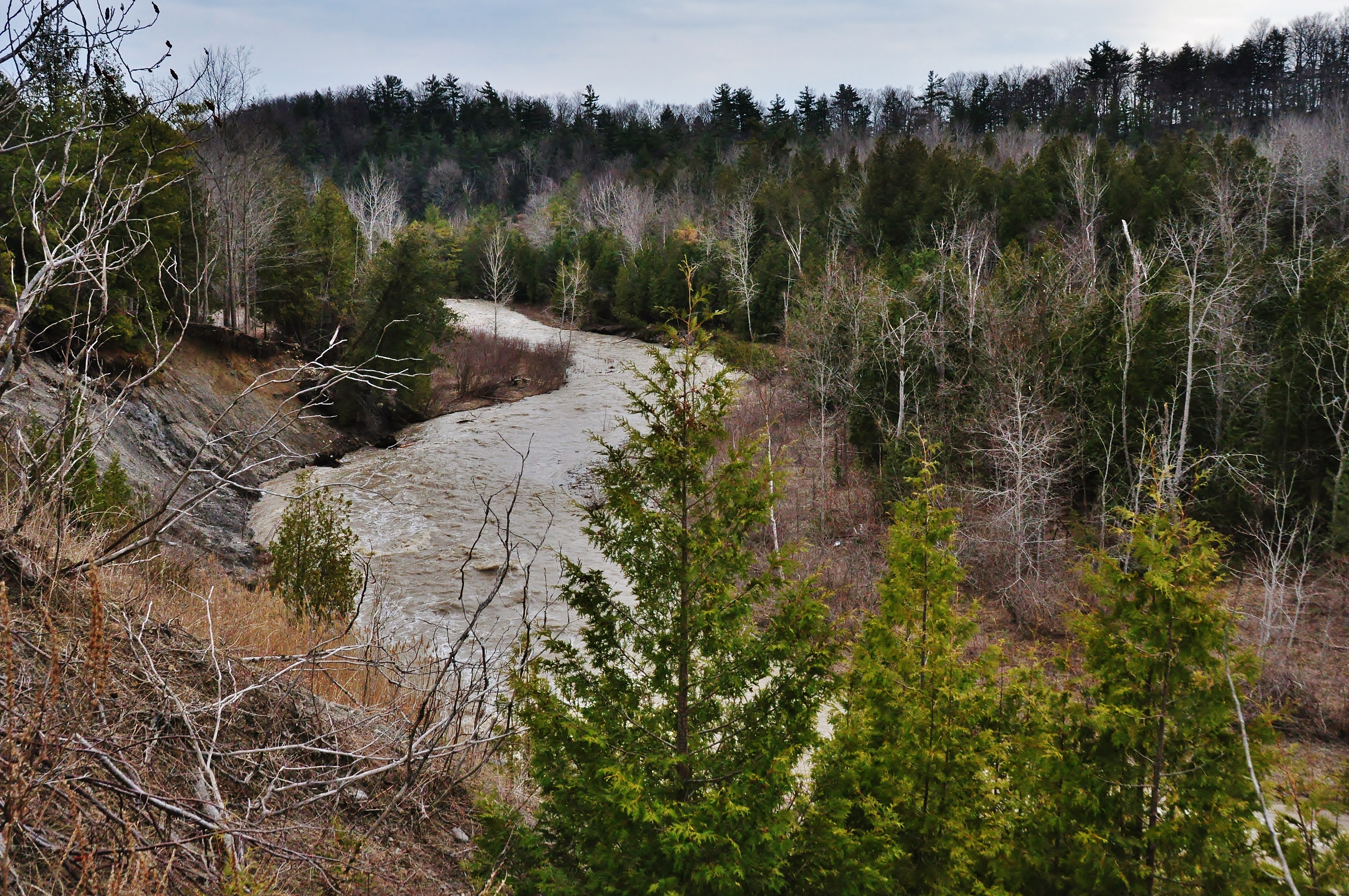
Little Rouge Creek at Rouge National Urban Park. The creek is one two watersheds that pass through the district.

The district's borders, which correspond to the former city's borders, are: Victoria Park Avenue (facing the rest of Toronto) to the west, the Rouge River, the Little Rouge Creek and the Scarborough-Pickering Townline (facing Pickering) to the east, Steeles Avenue (facing Markham) to the north, and Lake Ontario to the south.

Topographically, the district is dominated by two watersheds, Highland Creek and the Rouge River. Highland Creek lies almost entirely within Scarborough and occupies approximately 70% of its total area. It occupies the western half of Scarborough, while the Rouge River flows through the eastern portion. Both of these rivers flow into Lake Ontario. Due to the location of the Lakeshore CN railway right-of-way, both river deltas are constricted to narrow channels where they flow into the lake.

Highland Creek is the most urbanized watershed in Toronto with about 85% of its land use devoted to urban uses. Some sections of the river run through parks and remain in a fairly natural state, while other parts run through industrial or residential districts where the flow is often diverted or channelled. Sections of the creek are marked by deep ravines and valleys, which contain little or no urban development. The deep valley the creek cuts in its bottom sections remains primarily parkland, with little or no development taking place within the valley.

Conversely, the Rouge River valley has parts which are still in a natural, wooded state. The valley is home to a great variety of wildlife including deer, foxes, and the occasional coyote, while the river hosts salmon and catfish. The Rouge River Valley forms a part of Rouge National Urban Park, a national urban park situated along the eastern portion of Scarborough, and its neighbouring municipalities.

Along the shore of Lake Ontario is the earthen escarpment formation known as the Scarborough Bluffs. The Bluffs are about 14 kilometres (8.7 mi) long, and reach heights of more than 60 metres (200 ft) in places. They are part of a much larger formation known as the Iroquois Shoreline, most of which is located somewhat further inland. The Iroquois Shoreline marks the extent of a prehistoric lake, Glacial Lake Iroquois, whose level was quite a bit higher than present-day Lake Ontario's. It shrank in size at the close of the last ice age.

Erosion has been a problem along the Scarborough Bluffs. Properties located near the brink have been abandoned, and houses condemned, as the brink wears back away from the lake. Since the 1980s, large areas of beach at the base of the Bluffs have been reinforced with limestone breakwaters and construction rubble infilling.

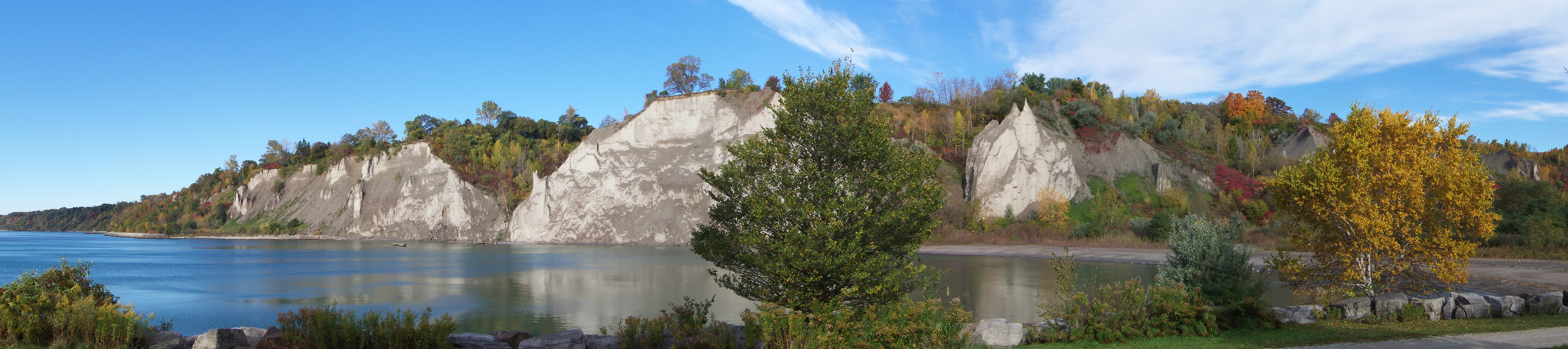
Panoramic view of the Scarborough Bluffs and Lake Ontario from the base

=== Climate ===
The district's climate is moderate for Canada due to its southerly location within the country and its proximity to Lake Ontario. It has a humid continental climate (Köppen climate classification Dfb), with warm, humid summers and generally cold winters. Mean temperature and precipitation tends to be slightly lower than the downtown core or south Etobicoke for instance, due in part to the weather station being farther from the moderating influence of the lake and also because of its more northeast location. Conditions vary based on proximity to the lake, with fog more common in the south and areas close to the lake noticeably cooler on hot summer days.

== Demographics ==
Federal census population history of Scarborough
Year	Pop.	±%
1851	4,244	—
1861	4,854	+14.4%
1871	4,615	−4.9%
1881	4,208	−8.8%
1891	4,028	−4.3%
1901	3,845	−4.5%
1911	4,713	+22.6%
1921	11,746	+149.2%
1931	20,682	+76.1%
1941	24,303	+17.5%
1951	56,292	+131.6%
1956	139,744	+148.2%
1961	217,286	+55.5%
1966	278,377	+28.1%
1971	334,310	+20.1%
1971A	338,022	+1.1%
1976	387,149	+14.5%
1981	443,353	+14.5%
1986	484,676	+9.3%
1991	524,598	+8.2%
1996	558,960	+6.6%
2001	593,297	+6.1%
Source: Statistics Canada

In the 2021 Census of Population conducted by Statistics Canada, the census districts within the former city had a population of 629,941 (Note: Population calculated by combining the populations of the six federal ridings.) living in 218,928 of its 228,939 total private dwellings, a change of −0.3% from its 2016 population of 632,098. With a land area of 187.70 square kilometres (72.47 sq mi), it had a population density of 3,356.1 people/km^{2} (8,692 people/sq mi) in 2021.

The majority of the district's population is between 25 and 64 years old. 52% fell into that "working age" during the last major survey, which also found 21% of Scarborough's population was 14 years old or younger, 15% were between 15 and 24, while senior citizens aged 65+ made up the remaining 12%. Like the rest of Canada, the population is aging. It is projected that close to 30% of Scarborough residents will be senior citizens by 2041. Scarborough has a large number of retirement communities, which attracts more seniors to the area creating a situation where the two largest age demographics in Scarborough will be over 55 and under 25.

=== Immigration ===
The vast majority of the district's population is composed of immigrants who have arrived in the last five decades, and their descendants. In 2016, 56.6% of residents were foreign-born.

The immigrant population has created vibrant multicultural locales in various areas. One of the more notable among these is the heavy concentration of Chinese businesses and restaurants in the Agincourt neighbourhood. Many of Scarborough's main arteries, including segments of Kingston Road, Eglinton Avenue East and Lawrence Avenue East, feature Caribbean, Chinese, African, and Indian restaurants and shops, as well as businesses representing the other ethnic groups in the area.

=== Ethnicity ===
According to the 2021 census, 472,250 residents identified as members of visible minority groups in Scarborough census tracts, comprising 76.8 percent of the total population of the district. (Note: Total of 124 census tracts from 5350330.00 through 5350378.28 in the Toronto CMA, all situated in the former Scarborough census subdivision.) According to the prior census conducted in 2016, the visible minority population numbered 453,570, comprising 73.9 percent of the total population of the district. (Note: Total of 123 census tracts from 5350330.00 through 5350378.28 in the Toronto CMA, all situated in the former Scarborough census subdivision.)

Largest ethnic origin in Scarborough by census tract based on the 2021 census

The district has one of the largest concentration of Sri Lankan Tamils outside Sri Lanka.

Largest panethnic groups in Scarborough by census tracts based on the 2021 census

Largest panethnic groups in Scarborough by census tract based on the 2011 census

Largest panethnic groups in Scarborough by census tract based on the 2001 census

Panethnic groups in Scarborough (1996–2021)
Panethnic group	2021 Canadian census		2016 Canadian census		2011 Canadian census (Note: Total of 121 census tracts from 5350330.00 through 5350378.28 in the Toronto CMA, all situated in the former Scarborough census subdivision.)		2006 Canadian census (Note: Total of 115 census tracts from 5350330.00 through 5350378.24 in the Toronto CMA, all situated in the former Scarborough census subdivision.)		2001 Canadian census		1996 Canadian census	
Panethnic group	Pop.	%	Pop.	%	Pop.	%	Pop.	%	Pop.	%	Pop.	%
South Asian	170,730	27.78%	156,420	25.47%	148,620	24.4%	131,460	22.15%	105,420	17.91%	82,430	14.86%
European (Note: Statistic includes all persons that did not make up part of a visible minority or an indigenous identity.)	137,675	22.4%	155,545	25.33%	176,415	28.96%	188,415	31.75%	233,105	39.6%	258,300	46.58%
East Asian (Note: Statistic includes total responses of "Chinese", "Korean", and "Japanese" under visible minority section on census.)	111,070	18.07%	121,930	19.86%	120,490	19.78%	121,805	20.52%	111,410	18.93%	98,670	17.79%
African	69,955	11.38%	66,555	10.84%	59,900	9.83%	61,540	10.37%	59,870	10.17%	55,195	9.95%
Southeast Asian (Note: Statistic includes total responses of "Filipino" and "Southeast Asian" under visible minority section on census.)	61,280	9.97%	56,620	9.22%	55,300	9.08%	44,920	7.57%	35,505	6.03%	25,050	4.52%
Middle Eastern (Note: Statistic includes total responses of "West Asian" and "Arab" under visible minority section on census.)	21,170	3.45%	18,255	2.97%	14,870	2.44%	15,945	2.69%	14,680	2.49%	12,020	2.17%
Latin American	8,495	1.38%	7,905	1.29%	7,745	1.27%	6,660	1.12%	5,610	0.95%	5,605	1.01%
Indigenous	4,585	0.75%	4,925	0.8%	3,675	0.6%	2,685	0.45%	2,400	0.41%	1,520	0.27%
Other/multiracial (Note: Statistic includes total responses of "Visible minority, n.i.e." and "Multiple visible minorities" under visible minority section on census.)	29,550	4.81%	25,885	4.22%	22,120	3.63%	20,070	3.38%	20,675	3.51%	15,725	2.84%
Total responses	614,510	98.99%	614,040	98.63%	609,135	98.79%	593,500	99.16%	588,675	99.22%	554,525	99.21%
Total population	620,761	100%	622,594	100%	616,600	100%	598,556	100%	593,297	100%	558,960	100%
Note: Totals greater than 100% due to multiple origin responses.

=== Religion ===
Religious groups in Scarborough (2001–2021)
Religious group	2021 Canadian census		2011 Canadian census		2001 Canadian census	
Religious group	Pop.	%	Pop.	%	Pop.	%
Christianity	273,035	43.78%	303,700	49.86%	345,120	58.63%
Irreligion	154,465	24.77%	137,660	22.6%	116,055	19.71%
Islam	86,935	13.94%	63,845	10.48%	46,180	7.84%
Hinduism	84,925	13.62%	79,205	13%	57,310	9.74%
Buddhism	14,620	2.34%	17,745	2.91%	16,480	2.8%
Sikhism	4,940	0.79%	3,485	0.57%	3,985	0.68%
Judaism	925	0.15%	575	0.09%	1,405	0.24%
Indigenous spirituality	85	0.01%	145	0.02%	—N/a	—N/a
Other	3,680	0.59%	1,630	0.27%	2,145	0.36%
Total responses	623,610	98.99%	609,135	98.79%	588,675	99.22%
Total population	629,941	100%	616,600	100%	593,297	100%

== Crime ==
Long-term trends show that the district is less prone to violent crime than the rest of Toronto. Between 1997 and 2006, the proportion of violent crime committed in Scarborough averaged 20.4% despite its making up on average 23.6% of the city's total population over that period. Murder rates for the district and the rest of Toronto show no particular divergence. Between 1997 and 2006, the ratio of murders in Scarborough as compared to the rest of Toronto ranged from a low of 8.8% to a high of 32.2%. According to former Toronto Police Chief Bill Blair, "[42 Division is] the safest division in the city"; this division includes north Scarborough. In 2008, the safest part of Toronto was north Scarborough from Victoria Park Ave. to the Pickering border, north of Highway 401.

In 2008, Toronto City Councillors Norm Kelly and Michael Thompson protested that the media was distorting how crime was reported in Scarborough. They noted that whenever a shooting occurred in the rest of the city the location was given as the nearest major intersection, while when a shooting happened in Scarborough the location was given as 'Scarborough'. According to the councillors, this gave people an erroneous impression of Scarborough as 'crime-ridden'. They proposed that news outlets sign a 'media protocol' so that all crime locations were given as intersections. However, the city's executive committee turned down the request citing this as a form of censorship. Mayor David Miller said "It's not city council's role to tell the media how to do their job".

== Economy ==
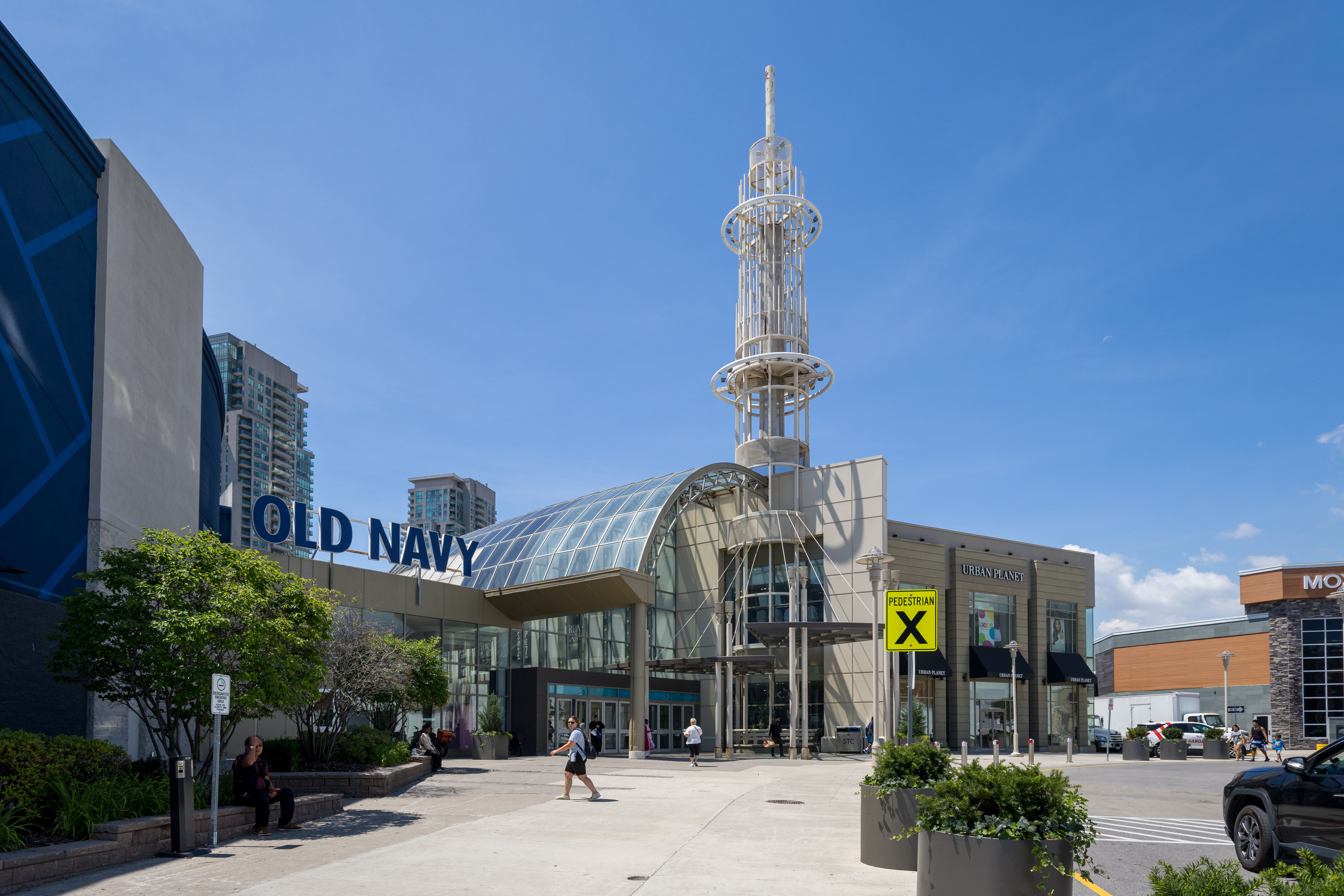
Scarborough Town Centre is a major shopping mall located in Scarborough City Centre.

Compared to the City of Toronto as a whole, industry in the district is similar in all labour force categories, save for manufacturing which is higher in the district, and professional, scientific and technical services which are lower. Notable companies that have their headquarters in the district include Toyota Canada, Owens Corning (Toronto), Elizabeth Grant International, Enterprise Holdings, Inc., Thomson Carswell, Bell Media, Teva Canada, Cinram, Royal Doulton, SKF, Amphenol, Dart Canada, Mastermind Toys, Alfa Laval, President's Choice Financial, Aviva, Yellow Pages Group, Telus, and Lee Kum Kee Canada. The pizza chains 241 Pizza and Pizza Nova have their headquarters in Scarborough. Amazon opened a new fulfillment centre in north Scarborough in 2020. Large companies that have moved out of Scarborough include: General Motors Canada Van Assembly plant (1993) and Eli Lilly Canada (2019).

A high-density business district has been built up in Scarborough City Centre. Points of interest in the area include Scarborough Town Centre, Albert Campbell Square, Street Eats Market, many surrounding stores, and government and business offices. The area has become one of Toronto's secondary business districts outside of Downtown Toronto.

== Culture ==
Most of the district's news media has been either weekly or monthly publications. The earliest newspaper was the Scarborough News and Advertiser which was published weekly starting in September 1921, which lasted until the 1930s. Other short-lived papers and magazines included The Enterprise (1945–1966), Scarborough Mail (1946–1955) and The News (1952–1996) and 54east magazine (2005–2009). The last remaining English-language local newspaper was the Scarborough Mirror, which started publication in 1962 and was later acquired by the Toronto Star's community news division, Metroland. In 2023, it became an online-only publication as part of Toronto.com. A Scarborough edition of the Toronto-wide photography publication SNAP Scarborough was launched in 2009. Ming Pao Daily News is a Chinese-language newspaper whose headquarters is in the district. They started publication in 1993.

In 1961, the CTV Toronto (CFTO) television channel began operating from the 9 Channel Nine Court studios at the intersection of McCowan Road and Highway 401. Today, the studio also is the headquarters of The Sports Network (TSN). Both companies produce programming at the studio. In 1970, Trillium Cable started to provide cable TV service to Scarborough. It was purchased by Shaw Cable in 1995; but later swapped with Rogers Cable in 2001. During the early days of the company, they produced several local shows for their own cable channel. These shows were produced by volunteers and showed a wide variation in quality. These shows were satirized by Mike Myers in his comedy film Wayne's World.

Residents of the district have developed their own unique sense of humour, as evidenced by Myers, whose Wayne's World character was inspired by growing up in the area. Other Scarborough natives include Lilly Singh, Eric McCormack (Will & Grace), John Candy (Second City, SCTV), musical group Barenaked Ladies and singer Abel Tesfaye known as the Weeknd. Actor Jim Carrey also lived in Scarborough during his teen years. Scarborough has also been the home of prominent hip hop artists and producers, including Maestro Fresh Wes, Choclair, Boi-1da, Nineteen85, Kardinal Offishall, Saukrates, David Strickland and the group BrassMunk.

According to the list of largest shopping malls in Canada, the Scarborough Town Centre is the fifth-largest in the country and the fourth-largest in the GTA. It is located next to the Scarborough Civic Centre, Albert Campbell Square, and Consilium Place. This area was developed as a city centre for the former City of Scarborough government. The Scarborough Walk of Fame is also located in the Town Centre, consisting of plaques embedded in the floor to honour notable residents, past and current. The inaugural inductees included National Basketball Association player Jamaal Magloire, Olympic gold medalist Vicky Sunohara, and eight prominent residents who contributed to advances in medicine, arts, and the community.

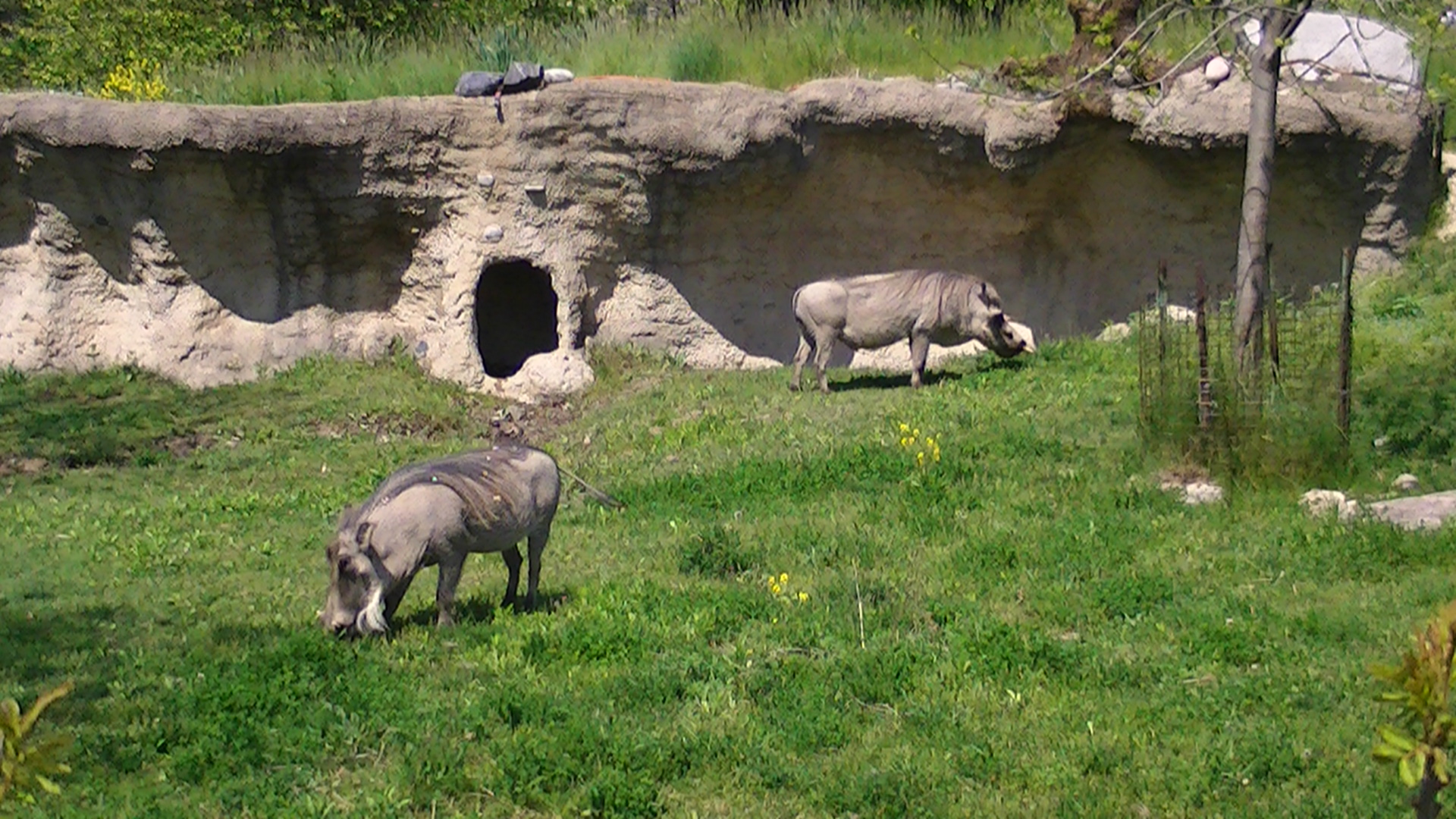
Warthogs at Toronto Zoo, situated in the Rouge River Valley

In 1974, the Toronto Zoo was moved from its original downtown location to its current location in the Rouge River valley. The new location enabled the zoo to increase its overall area from 3 hectares (7.4 acres) to over 300 hectares (740 acres). The zoo was transformed at that time from a 19th-century style zoo with a few animals cramped behind iron bars into a zoo where space was provided to animals and the setting attempted to duplicate the animals' natural environments.

There are a large number of golf courses in the district, with a mix of public and private courses. Dentonia Park is a public course established in 1967 and is situated in the Taylor-Massey Creek ravine beside the Victoria Park subway station. Formerly a private club, the Tam O'Shanter Golf Course was established in 1973 as a public course and is located alongside Highland Creek. Private clubs include the Toronto Hunt Club which was the first golf course in Scarborough, established in 1895 alongside Lake Ontario. and the Scarboro Golf and Country Club was established in 1912. The Cedarbrae Golf & Country Club was established in 1922 and moved to its current Rouge River Valley location at Steeles Ave East in 1954.

On May 17, 2006, the Nike Malvern Sports Complex was opened in the Malvern neighbourhood. Nike Canada donated CA$500,000 to build the complex, which includes a basketball court, a practice soccer pitch, and a running track. The track was constructed from 50,000 used running shoes. The complex was built on the grounds of the St. Mother Teresa Catholic Academy and is open to the public. Olympic hurdler Perdita Felicien was on hand at the opening to encourage youth to participate in sports.

== Education ==
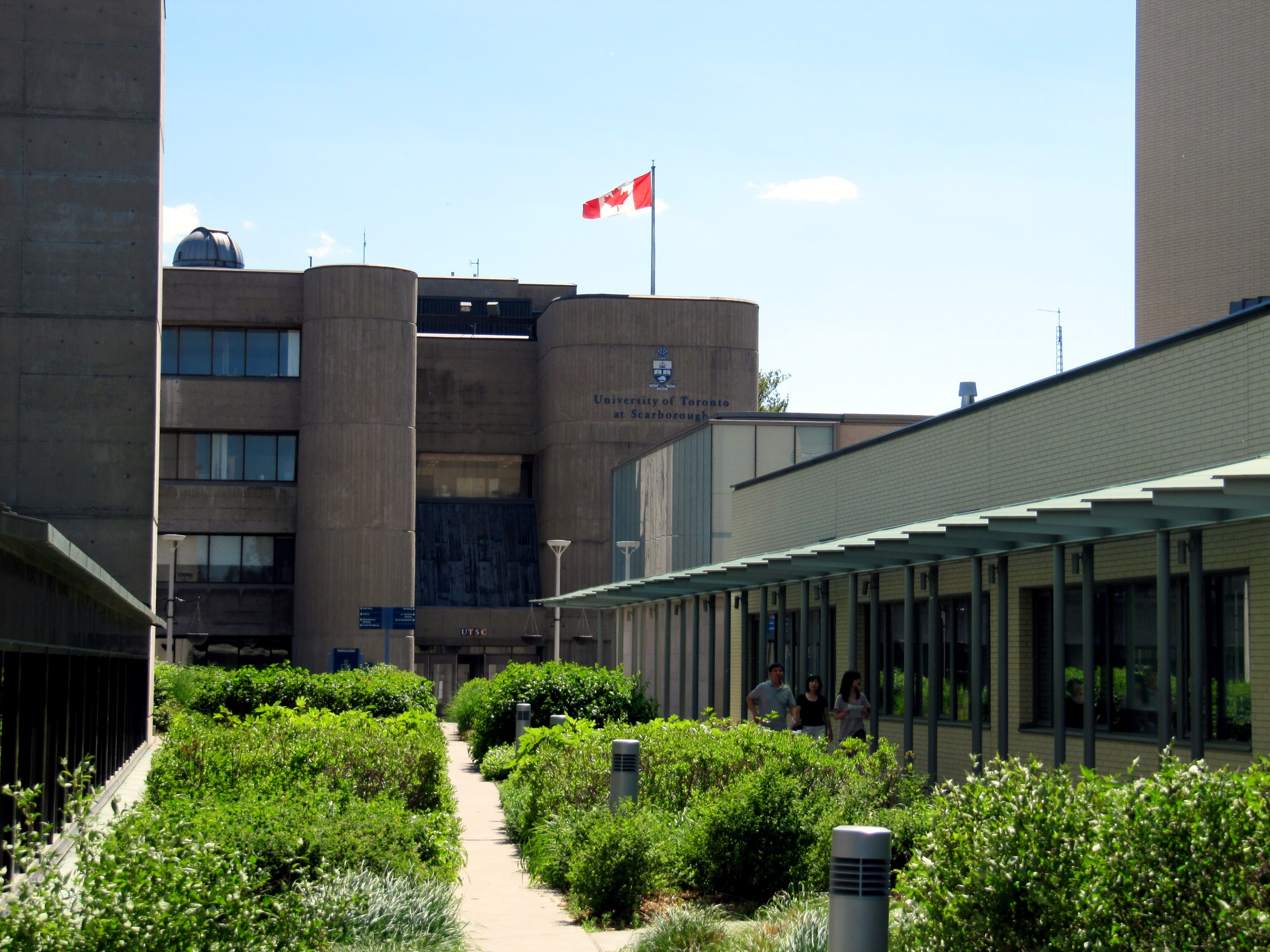
The University of Toronto is one of two post-secondary institutions located in Scarborough.

Both Agincourt Collegiate Institute and R. H. King Academy claim to be the oldest secondary schools in the district. Agincourt Collegiate Institute (the former Agincourt Continuation School) opened in 1915. It became a high school in 1954. R. H. King Academy opened in 1922 as the Scarborough High School being the first high school in the Scarborough area at that time, and became a collegiate in 1930.

Four public school boards operate primary and secondary schools in the district: Conseil scolaire catholique MonAvenir (CSCM), Conseil scolaire Viamonde (CSV), the Toronto Catholic District School Board (TCDSB), and the Toronto District School Board (TDSB). CSV and TDSB operate as secular public school boards, the former operating French first language institutiona, whereas the latter operates English first language institutions. The other two school boards, CSCM and TCDSB, operate as public separate school boards, the former operating French first-language separate schools, the latter operating English first-language separate schools. As of 2008, there are 28 secondary schools in Scarborough.

In addition to primary and secondary schools, two post-secondary institutions are located in Scarborough. The University of Toronto maintains a Scarborough campus, established in 1964, which has an enrolment of more than 15,000 students as of 2024. Centennial College was opened in 1966. It was the first vocational college to open in Ontario. Starting from one campus in Warden Woods, it grew to three campuses across Scarborough (and two others located in East York and North York).

== Governance ==
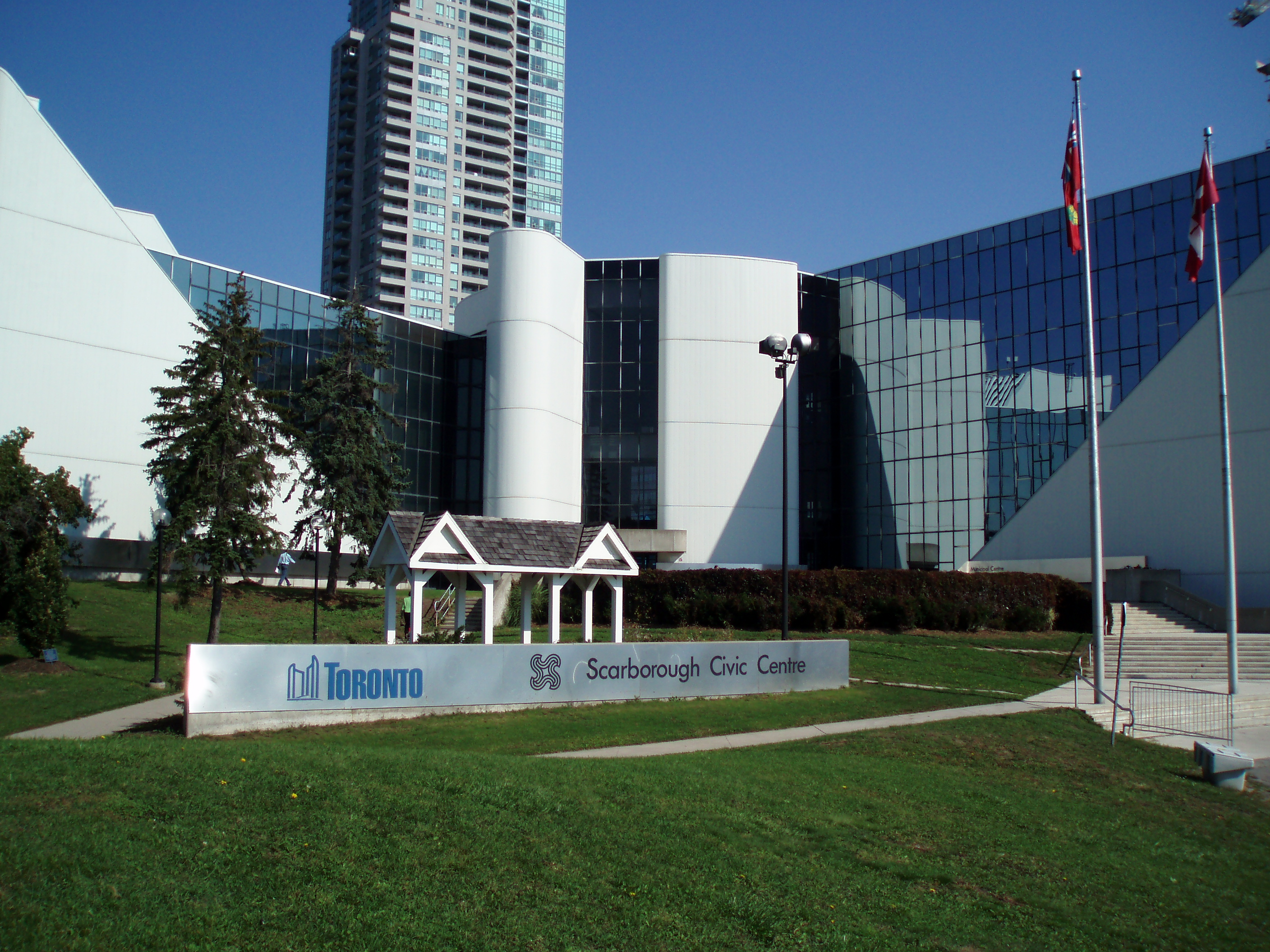
The Scarborough Community Council meets once a month at the Scarborough Civic Centre.

From the incorporation of Scarborough as a township in 1850, the head of the local government was a reeve who chaired the town council. In 1953, Scarborough and twelve other townships, towns, and villages in York County federated with the City of Toronto to form Metropolitan Toronto. Scarborough retained its own town council but an added layer of government, the Metropolitan Toronto Council, with the reeve of Scarborough having a seat. In 1967, Scarborough was incorporated as borough at which point the head of the local government was styled as mayor. A Board of Control, consisting of the mayor and four directly elected Controllers, was also created as an executive committee of Scarborough's council, whose members also sat on Metro Council. In 1973, Scarborough opened its new city hall, the Scarborough Civic Centre where the borough and later its city council met. In 1983, Scarborough attained city status, but its governing structure remained the same. In 1988, the Board of Control was abolished.

In 1998, the municipalities of Metropolitan Toronto were dissolved and amalgamated into a single City of Toronto. Since then, Scarborough has been a community within the city of Toronto, and the head of the local government is the Mayor of Toronto and is governed by Toronto City Council. Community councils were formed to process issues considered local to their communities. Scarborough's community council, made up of the district's local councillors, meets once a month at the Civic Centre. The council deals with a variety of local issues such as outdoor patio applications, neighbourhood traffic plans, and exemptions from certain by-laws such as retail signs, fences, trees and ravines. Decisions made by community council are approved by Toronto City Council in order to take effect.

Scarborough federal election results
Year	Liberal		Conservative		New Democratic		Green	
2021	60%	141,547	23%	53,070	13%	30,777	1%	1,702
2019	57%	154,233	25%	67,907	12%	32,623	3%	9,220

Scarborough provincial election results
Year	PC		New Democratic		Liberal		Green	
2022	39%	73,034	24%	45,123	31%	57,877	3%	4,928
2018	40%	92,965	31%	73,063	24%	55,759	2%	5,170

Scarborough is represented by six ridings for the provincial government and Federal government. Municipal riding boundaries were harmonized within the City of Toronto to match the provincial boundaries in 1999 through provincial legislation called The Fewer Municipal Politicians Act of 1999. This took effect on December 1, 2000. Ridings were represented by two councillors per riding until 2018 when the Government of Ontario reduced this to one councillor per riding. Scarborough now has six councillors.

=== Coat of arms ===
Scarborough coat of arms

The coat of arms of Scarborough was adopted when the borough became a city on June 29, 1983. A grant of arms was issued by the Canadian Heraldic Authority on February 1, 1996. The coat of arms had a shield within a laurel wreath. Upon this shield were the following elements, in quarters:

- The arms of the province of Ontario
- A sheaf of wheat
- Two cog wheels and a factory
- A view of the Scarborough Bluffs

==== Blazon ====
===== Arms =====
Or a columbine flower and a chief embattled Azure issuant from the upper chief a demi-sun Or;

===== Crest =====
Issuant from a coronet heightened with four ears of corn (one and two-halves visible) alternating with four millstones (two visible) Or a maple leaf Gules;

===== Supporters =====
Two stags Or attired and unguled Azure each gorged with a collar of braid Gules Argent and Azure standing upon a representation of the Scarborough Bluffs proper rising above the waters of Lake Ontario Azure and Argent;

===== Motto =====
HOME ABOVE THE BLUFFS

== Infrastructure ==
=== Public transit ===
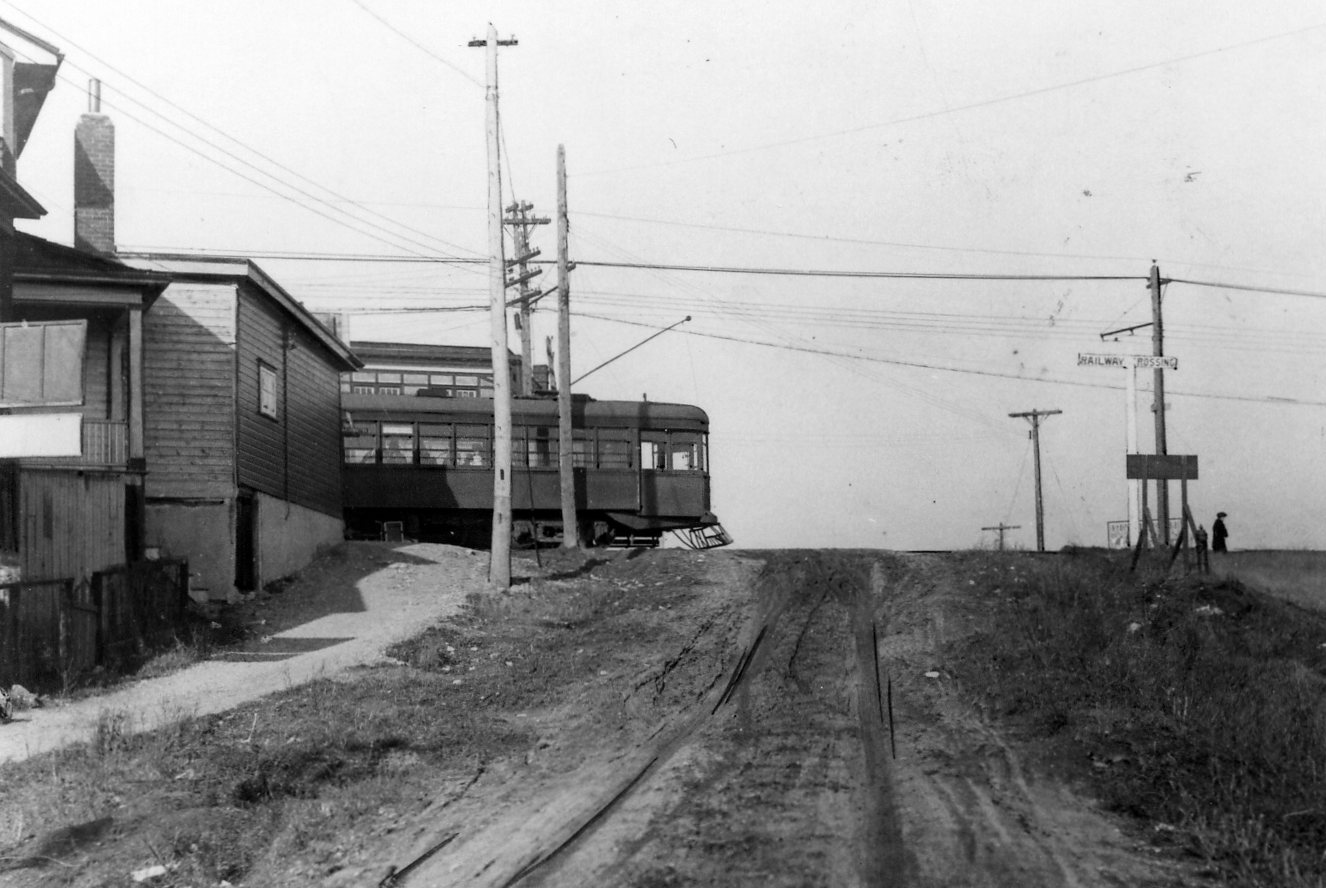
A streetcar on Kingston Road, looking south on Birchmount Road. The first transit line in Scarborough was established in 1893.

The expansion of Toronto in the east, in the 19th century, led to the development of housing stock along the Kingston Road and Danforth Road corridors in Scarborough. This led to the creation of a transit line. In 1893, the Toronto and Scarboro' Electric Railway, Light and Power Company built a single-track radial line along Kingston Road to Blantyre. Over the next 13 years this was extended to West Hill. In 1904, the line became the Scarboro Division of the Toronto and York Radial Railway. Service continued along this line until 1936 when it was replaced by bus service.

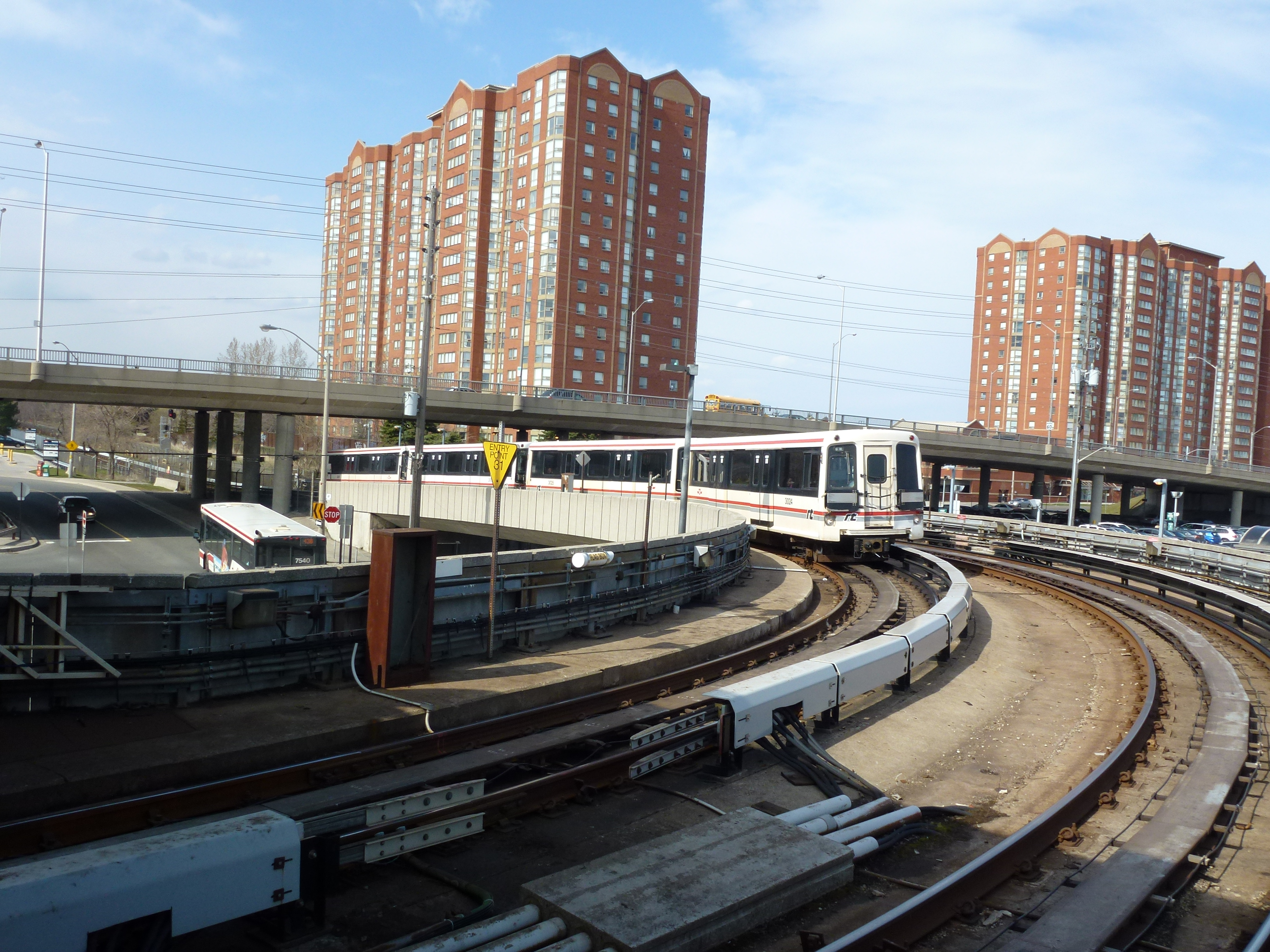
A train on Line 3 Scarborough approaching Kennedy station

Since 1921, the Toronto Transit Commission (TTC) gradually expanded its public transportation network to Scarborough. Today, it operates bus and rapid transit routes in the district. Line 2 Bloor–Danforth has three subway stations in Scarborough: Victoria Park, Warden, and Kennedy, the current eastern terminus. In 1985, the Government of Ontario opened the Scarborough RT, an above-ground light metro line that operated between Kennedy station at its west and McCowan Road at its east. In 2023, the line shut down permanently due to aging infrastructure which also caused a derailment earlier that year.

Construction of an extension of Line 2 further east into Scarborough started in June 2021 and is expected to be complete around 2030. The line will be extended 7.8 kilometres from Kennedy station with stations at McCowan Road-Lawrence Avenue, Scarborough Centre, and McCowan Road-Sheppard Avenue. Opened in February 2026, Line 5 Eglinton is a light rail line with its eastern terminus at Kennedy station. The City of Toronto is also proposing another light rail line known as the Eglinton East LRT that is planned to operate from Kennedy station to the University of Toronto Scarborough.

Seven rail stations also provide access to two commuter rail lines operated by GO Transit. The Lakeshore East line runs across the south end of the district with Rouge Hill GO Station, Guildwood GO Station, Eglinton GO Station, and Scarborough GO Station running from east to west. The Stouffville line runs north–south in the west end of Scarborough with Milliken GO Station, Agincourt GO Station, Kennedy station. An eighth station on the Stouffville line will be constructed between Milliken and Agincourt stations at Finch–Kennedy GO Station. Other connecting public transportation services with connections to TTC bus routes in Scarborough include Durham Region Transit and York Region Transit.

=== Roads and highways ===
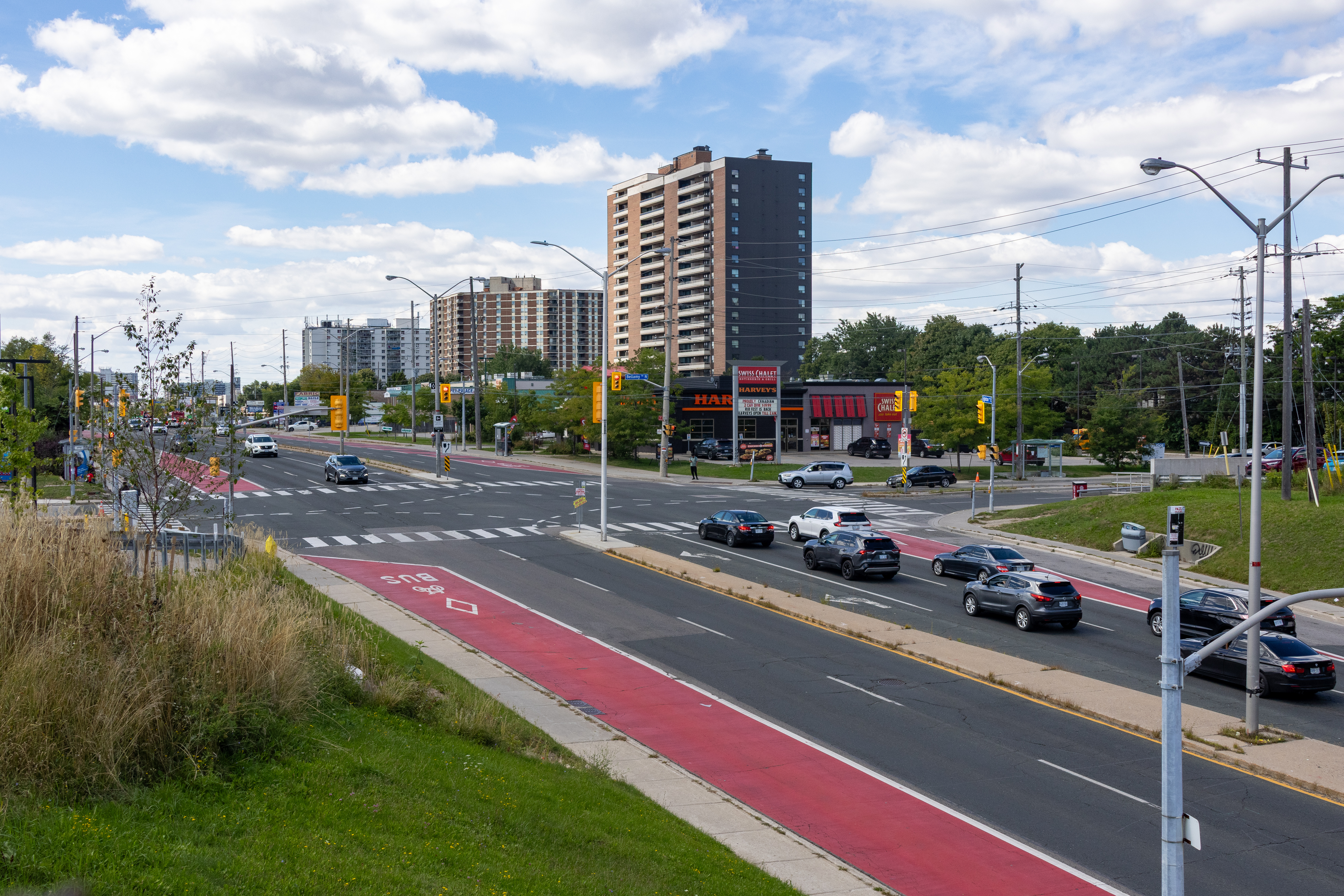
Eglinton Avenue is a major east–west roadway that passes through Scarborough.

The district's arterial roads are laid out on a grid system of north–south and east–west, corresponding to the concession roads of the original township, laid out to facilitate the establishment of farming communities. Kingston Road and Danforth Avenue were laid out prior to surveying the township, and both run diagonally in a southwest–northeast direction across the south end of Scarborough.

From north to south, the major east–west arterial roads are Steeles Avenue, Finch Avenue, Sheppard Avenue, Ellesmere Road, Lawrence Avenue, Eglinton Avenue and St. Clair Avenue. From west to east, the major north–south arterial roads are Victoria Park Avenue, Pharmacy Avenue, Warden Avenue, Birchmount Road, Kennedy Road, Midland Avenue, Brimley Road, McCowan Road, Bellamy Road North, Markham Road, Scarborough Golf Club Road, Neilson Road, Morningside Avenue, Meadowvale Road and Port Union Road.

Kingston Road was formerly Ontario Highway 2, and was the main highway through the district until the building of Highway 401, which runs east–west across the district, with six to eight lanes in each direction. The short, minor freeway Highway 2A runs parallel to Lake Ontario in the eastern part of Scarborough.

=== Water infrastructure ===
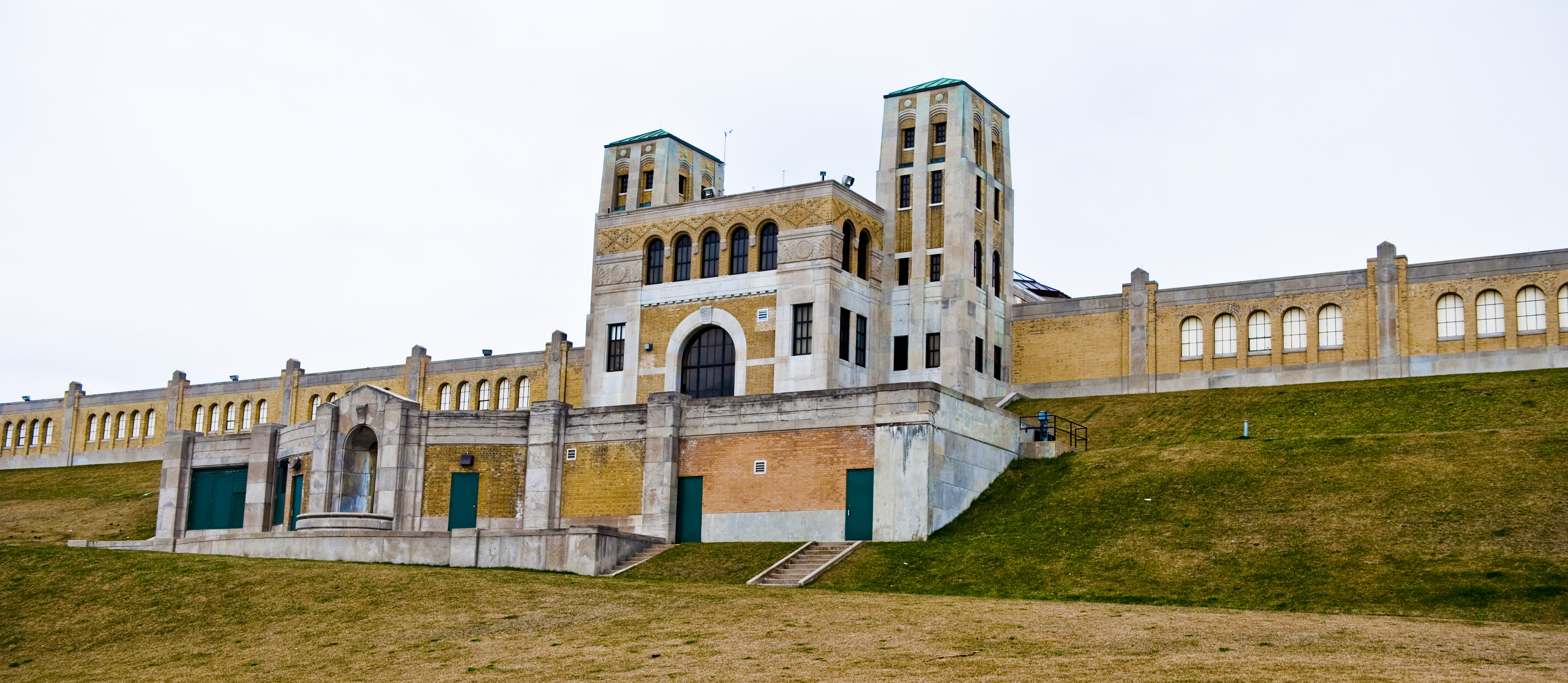
Scarborough's drinking water is supplied by the R.C. Harris Filtration Plant, situated at the southwest boundary of the district.

Scarborough's drinking water is supplied by the R.C. Harris Filtration Plant at the foot of Victoria Park Avenue and the F. J. Horgan Filtration Plant. The F. J. Horgan Filtration Plant was built in 1979 and was formerly known as the 'Easterly Plant'. Upgrades completed in 2011 allow it to process up to 800 megalitres per day and it will also be the first plant to replace chlorine with ozone as its primary cleansing method. Wastewater for Scarborough is treated at the Highland Creek Treatment Plant. This plant was constructed in 1954 and started processing in 1956. It has undergone continual expansion to meet ongoing demand.

== In popular culture ==
Catherine Hernandez's 2017 novel Scarborough centres on the coming of age of three children living in the Galloway Road neighbourhood of Scarborough.

Scarborough is a 2021 adaptation of the novel Scarborough.

Brother is an adaption of the novel of the same name, also set in the Galloway Road neighbourhood.

Morningside is a 2024 film about seven characters who meet at a community centre in Scarborough.

== See also ==
- List of reeves and mayors of Scarborough, Ontario
- Scarborough Board of Control
- List of neighbourhoods in Scarborough
- McClure radioactive site
