= McClure radioactive site =

Radioactive site in Toronto, Ontario, Canada

The McClure radioactive site was a radioactive site in Scarborough, Toronto. It was discovered in 1980 at a housing development built by the Ontario Housing Corporation on McClure Crescent in the Malvern neighbourhood. It was contaminated with radium from a previous industrial use.

== Background ==
McClure Crescent is a residential street in Malvern (near the intersection of Neilson Road and Sheppard Avenue) where the contaminated soil was discovered. In the 1940s, Radium Luminous Industries was a company that operated a plant on the same site. The plant extracted radium from scrap metal to be used for experiments in accelerated plant growth. The experiments ultimately proved unsuccessful and the company shut down operations. However, the soil on the site of the plant was radioactively contaminated.

In the 1970s, the Ontario provincial government purchased the land for a housing project. In 1980, the radioactive soil was rediscovered on McClure Crescent. Additional contaminated soil was discovered on nearby McLevin Avenue in April 1990.

After lengthy litigation and negotiation, the government agreed to buy back some of the properties and remove the contaminated soil. In 1995, the soil was excavated from 60 properties and moved to a temporary storage facility on Passmore Avenue.

Some of the radioactive material was transferred and is stored at Chalk River, Ontario. The bulk of the soil (about 16,000 cubic metres) was buried at the Passmore Avenue site and is continually monitored. Since it was buried results have shown that it is not adversely affecting the local environment. In 1999 monitoring of ambient gamma radiation remained at 0.04 μSv/h which is below the 0.06 μSv/h minimum set by the Low-Level Radioactive Waste Management Office.
