= Scarborough Bluffs =

Escarpment in Toronto, Canada

- Escarpment
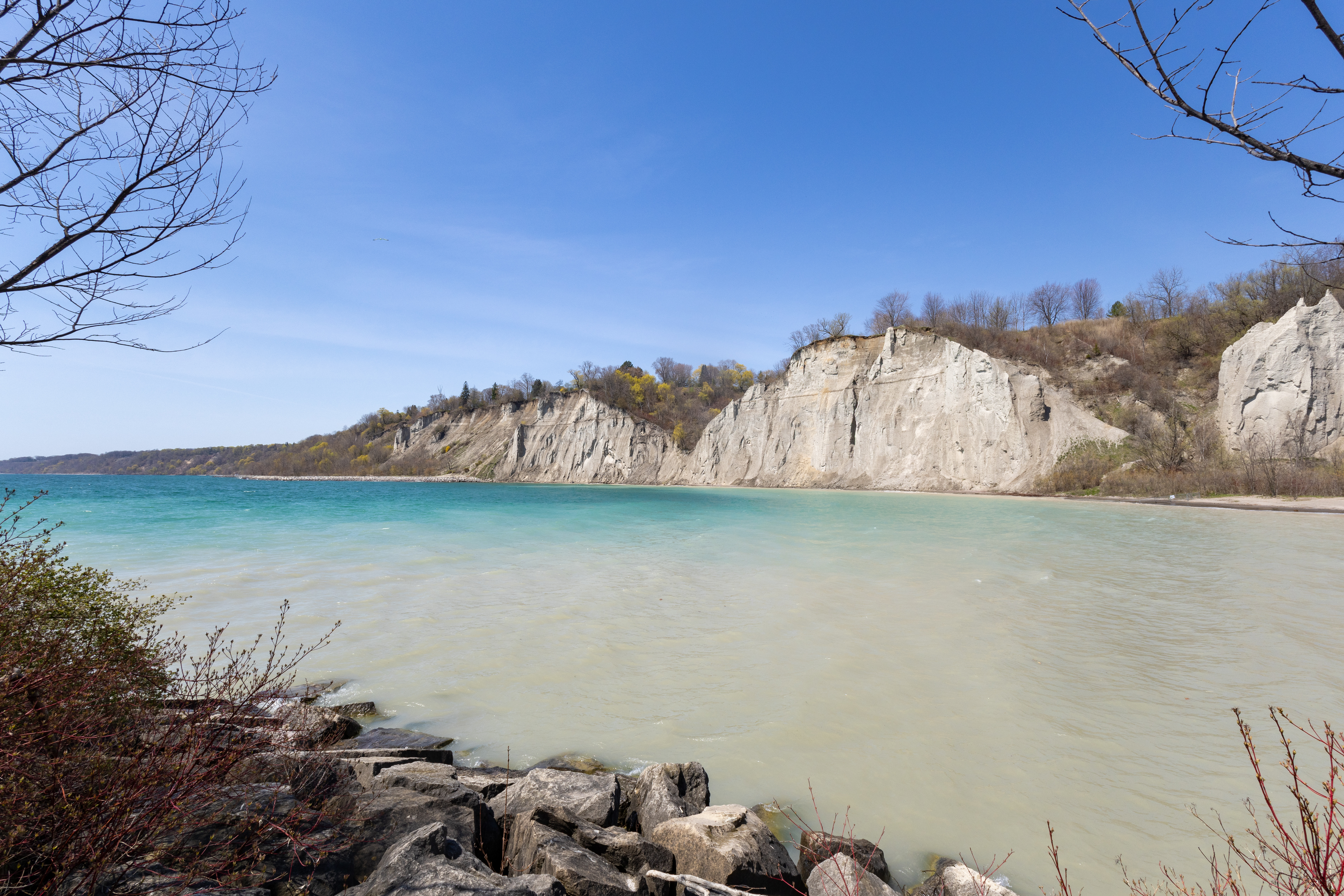
- Scarborough Bluffs seen from Bluffer's Park

- Location within Ontario
- Coordinates: 43°43′08″N 79°13′30″W
- Location: Ontario, Canada

The Scarborough Bluffs, also known as The Bluffs, is an escarpment in the Scarborough district of Toronto, Ontario, Canada. There are eleven parks along the bluffs, with Bluffer’s Park being the only one with a beach. Forming much of the eastern portion of Toronto's waterfront, the Scarborough Bluffs stands above the shoreline of Lake Ontario. At its highest point, the escarpment rises 90 metres (300 ft) above the coastline and spans a length of 15 kilometres (9.3 mi).

== History ==
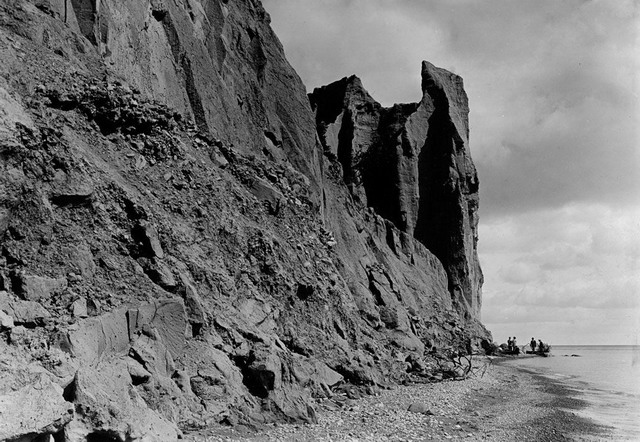
The Scarborough Bluffs previously extended further along the coast of Lake Ontario, but its western fringe was leveled by explosives to make way for urban development.

The French gave the name "Les Grands Ecores", or tall points on the shore, to the cliffs. In the 1788 Plan of Toronto by Alexander Aitken, the bluffs were simply known as the High Lands. They became known as the Scarborough Highlands in 1793 named after Scarborough, North Yorkshire. This name was chosen by Elizabeth Simcoe, who was the wife of the first lieutenant governor of Upper Canada, John Graves Simcoe. The escarpment along Lake Ontario reminded Elizabeth Simcoe of the limestone cliffs in her hometown. In her diary, she wrote, "The shore is extremely bold and has the appearance of chalk cliffs, but I believe they are only white sand. They appeared so well that we talked of building a summer residence there and calling it Scarborough." The name was later given to the entire township in 1796. In time, the cliffs became known as the Bluffs. A stylized version of The Bluffs was incorporated into the design of the official flag of the former city of Scarborough.

The Scarborough Bluffs formerly extended further west along the coastline of Lake Ontario towards the Toronto Harbour, but extensive areas along the western fringe were leveled by the use of explosives for the implementation of primarily industrial and some residential urban development. Even the existing formation has and continues to shrink considerably decade after a decade due to consistent and dramatic erosion.

The Bluffs has become a community meeting place for people of all ages. It features various recreational hiking and walking trails, as well as picnic tables, fire pits, places to pitch a tent, parking lots, a restaurant, and a large marina with a boating club.

== Geology ==
The Bluffs run 15 kilometres (9.3 mi) from the foot of Victoria Park Avenue in the west to the mouth of Highland Creek in the east, reaching as high as 90 metres (300 ft)— the equivalent of twenty-five storeys. However, the escarpment continues westward inland, running between Kingston Road and Queen Street East, pausing over the Don Valley, and continuing on the north side of Davenport Road. The escarpment forms part of the old shoreline of Glacial Lake Iroquois, formed after the last ice age, which left valuable geological records as the part of the escarpment by the lake eroded. The eroded alluvial deposits from the Bluffs then settled westward to form the Toronto Islands.

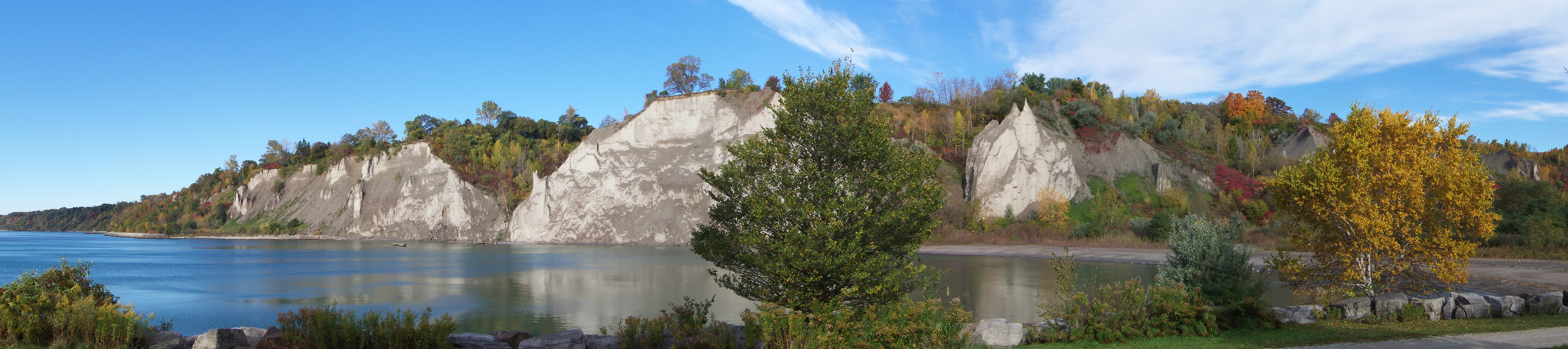
Panoramic view of the Scarborough Bluffs and Lake Ontario from the base.

== Issues ==
=== Erosion ===
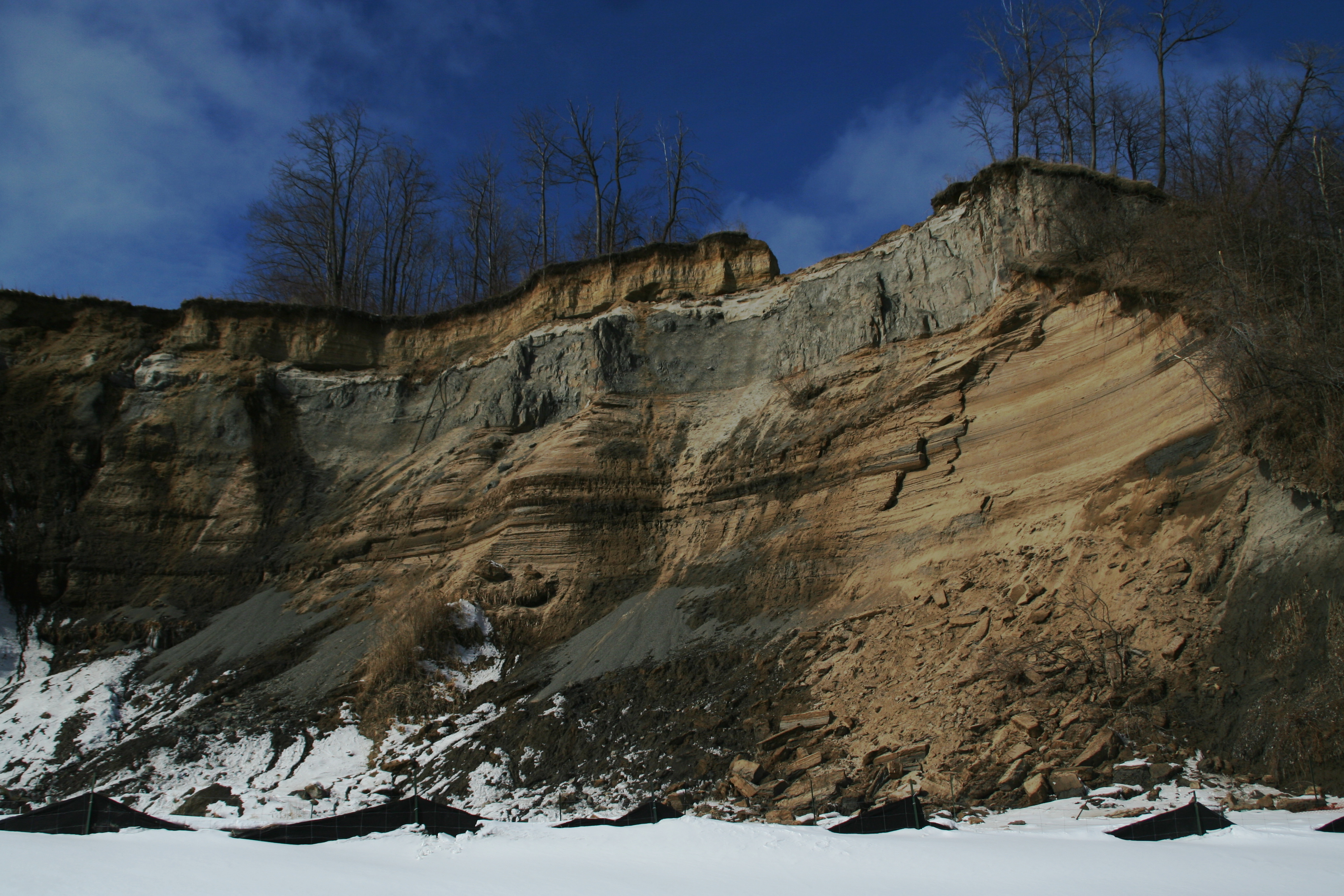
Erosion is a major issue in the preservation of the Scarborough Bluffs.

The Scarborough Bluffs have been eroding at a rapid rate since residences have been built along the lake bluff tops. The million-dollar views have been prime real estate since the 1940s. The desire for a beautiful lakeside view and an affluent lifestyle led to a real estate boom along the Bluffs—this resulted in a direct correlation of the accelerating rate of erosion. The eroding Bluffs have resulted in damaged private property and the need for public assets to be spent on repairs and corrective action. In summer 2008, chunks of the Bluffs had eroded to the point that one quarter of a cottage that actor and comedian Billy Van once owned, was left hanging on the cliff—the cottage was deemed a safety hazard by Toronto city officials as a result. To combat erosion, boulders acting as armour, rocks, and trees were placed at the base. However, to place these rocks and trees, a beach must be created to allow trucks to access the cliff base which would involve leveling parts of the Bluffs, such as the aforementioned Bluffer's Park. The Cathedral Bluffs, which is an impressive portion of the Bluffs, was the result of continued erosion. In 2017, the Toronto and Region Conservation Authority (TRCA) created the Scarborough Waterfront Project which aims to revamp about 11 kilometres of Scarborough Bluff's shoreline which includes the expansion of the existing beach by approximately 60 metres into Lake Ontario between Bluffer's Park and Meadowcliffe.

On August 23, 2020, a large portion of the Scarborough Bluffs near Lookout Point collapsed onto a beach causing "explosion-like" sounds followed by a wave of dust. A number of beachgoers were in the area but there were no reports of injuries in the collapse.

=== Safety ===
The Scarborough Bluffs have been a sought out destination for photographers and visitors to trek through. However, due to erosion and flooding, this leads to dangerous conditions; according to the TRCA, numerous people ignore warning signage. Areas that appear to be stable can collapse. "In terms of the park areas or where people want to go right at the top of the Bluffs, it's completely safe as long as they stay on the appropriate side of the fence. It's when they go on the wrong side of the fence that it causes issue". Currently, for those who ignore signage and enter restricted areas, fines of up to $5,000 will be handed out.

== Parks ==
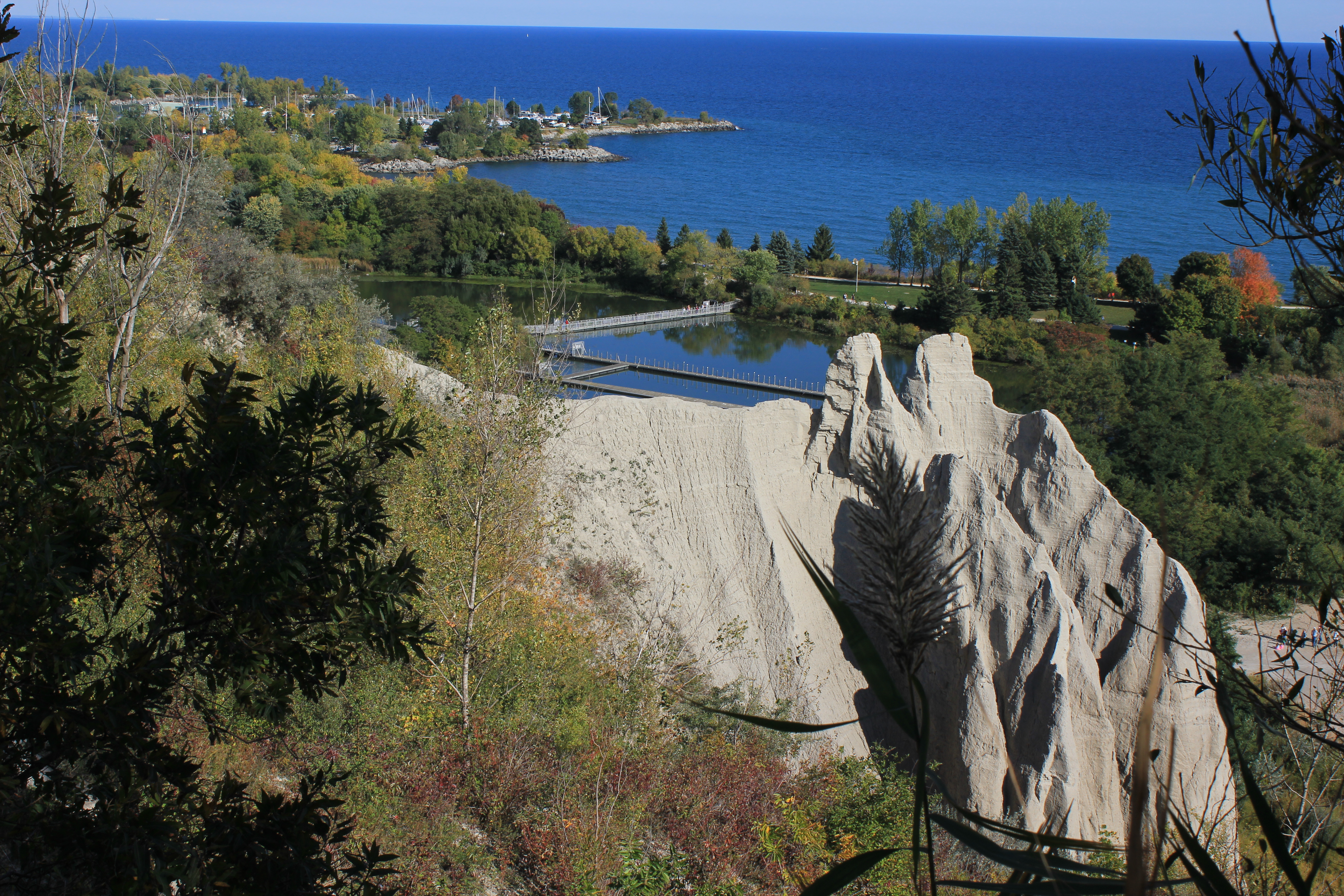
View from atop the Scarborough Bluffs at Bluffers Park. The Bluffer's Park Yacht Club is visible to the left.

A number of city parks are located along the bluffs from Victoria Park Avenue to Rouge River. Most are located on the top the bluffs, but some are located at the base along the shoreline with Lake Ontario.

Development of parkland began with the then Borough of Scarborough prior to 1960, while some remained in private hands. The land that makes up Cathedral Bluffs Park was originally owned by Sisters of St. Joseph, who later sold it to developers; who left the area near the edge of the Bluffs as parkland. The land was later acquired by TRCA in 1960. Cudia Park and Scarborough Heights Park were parks that were acquired by Metro Toronto in 1960 from Scarborough, and later transferred to TRCA. From 1960 to 1978 the parks were acquired by the TRCA which developed into today's current parks. Sylvan Park was acquired by Metro Toronto in 1966, and later transferred to the TRCA. Rosetta McClain Gardens was another property acquired in 1959 by Metro Toronto from Robert Watson McClain. However, it did not become a park until 1977, when it was transferred to the TRCA.

Most parks do not have direct access to Lake Ontario, such as Scarboro Crescent Park. Located on Cecil Crescent and due west of Bluffer's Park, the park is located on top of bluffs with no access to the water. It was formerly known as Scarborough Bluffs Park before the municipal government renamed it as Scarboro Crescent Park, to discourage users from attempting to climb down from the location. One of the only park along the Bluffs that has direct access to the lake is Bluffer's Park. It features a sandy beach and man-made berms that provide views of both the bluffs and the lake; land was acquired by TRCA from Borough of Scarborough in 1960 and opened as a park in 1975. Port Union Waterfront Park is another park that features breakwaters to protect its shoreline. Breakwaters are also found between Sylvan and Cudia Park. Berms and infill were also added to create waterfront area at East Point Park.

Municipal parks on the Scarborough Bluffs includes:

- Bluffer's Park
- Cathedral Bluffs Park
- Chesterton Shores
- Crescentwood Park
- Cudia Park
- East Point Park
- Doris McCarthy Trail
- Grey Abbey Park
- Guild Park and Gardens
- Harrison Properties
- Port Union Waterfront Park
- Rosetta McClain Gardens
- Rouge Beach Park
- Scarboro Crescent Park
- Scarborough Heights Park
- South Marine Drive Park
- Sylvan Park

== Communities ==
There are two registered non-profit community associations in the Scarborough Bluffs area

- The Scarborough Bluffs Community Association, which represents the Birch Cliff, Cliffside and Cliffcrest neighbourhoods
- The Guildwood Village Community Association, which represents the Guildwood Village neighbourhood

== See also ==
- Geography of Toronto
- Toronto ravine system
- Toronto waterfront
