= Flag of Scarborough =

Canadian municipal flag

Flag of former city of Scarborough
- Use: Small vexillological symbol or pictogram in black and white showing the different uses of the flag
- Proportion: 1:2
- Adopted: August 19, 1969
- Design: Abstract
- Designed by: Doris McCarthy

The official flag of Scarborough consisted of a stylized abstract impression of the Scarborough Bluffs and Lake Ontario in blue on the left and bottom of the flag. The background is white, with the red Maple Leaf of the Flag of Canada near the centre of the otherwise void area.

== History ==
The flag was officially dedicated on August 19, 1969, by then-Mayor Albert Campbell at a special ceremony in Thomson Memorial Park. It was designed by local painter Doris McCarthy (1910–2010) in the spring of 1968, who was presented with the idea by her friend Albert Campbell. McCarthy based the design on ideas presented by Campbell and likely from her influence in living by the Bluffs.

The need for the flag was proposed by Campbell to give the new borough an identity at civic events. The flag was used at the Scarborough Civic Centre, municipal buildings and schools of the Scarborough Board of Education.

Scarborough was one of three municipalities within Metropolitan Toronto to introduce a civic flag:

- Toronto - Flag of Toronto was adopted in 1974
- Etobicoke - Flag of Etobicoke, Ontario, was adopted in 1975 and amended in 1995

The City of York, City of North York and Borough of East York used corporate slogan civic logo or motto as a banner instead of an official flag.

After the 1998 amalgamation of Toronto, the official use of civic symbols from the former municipalities was no longer legally valid and the Scarborough flag was no longer flown on municipal buildings. In early January 2004, Toronto City councillors Brian Ashton and Glenn De Baeremaeker argued at the newly established Scarborough Community Council for the re-establishment of the Scarborough flag as a symbol of the borough. On January 27, 2004, Toronto City Council granted a Scarborough Community Council request to be allowed to fly the former City of Scarborough flag. In early January 2008, De Baermaeker spoke up about a lack of funding for civic symbols, saying it would only cost "$5,000 to buy 100 Scarborough flags to put in front of our civic buildings." On January 29 and 30, 2008, Toronto City Council authorized the allocation of $20,000 to order Scarborough flags to be used for municipal and civic purposes by the City and local City Councillors.

== See also ==
- Flag of Toronto
- List of city flags in Canada
